= Liechtenstein =

Microstate in Central Europe

Principality of Liechtenstein Fürstentum Liechtenstein (German)
- Flag Coat of arms
- Motto: "Für Gott, Fürst und Vaterland" ("For God, Prince and Fatherland")
- Anthem: "Oben am jungen Rhein" ("High on the Young Rhine")
- Location of Liechtenstein (green) in Europe (agate grey) – [Legend]

- Capital: Vaduz
- Largest municipality: Schaan; 47°10′00″N 9°30′35″E
- Official languages: German
- Nationality (2017): 66.2 % Liechtensteiners; 9.5 % Swiss; 5.8 % Austrians; 4.2 % Germans; 3.1 % Italians; 1.9 % Portuguese; 1.6 % Turks; 1.1 % Albanians; 1.0 % Spaniards; 5.6 % other
- Religion (2020): 79.4 % Christianity; 69.6 % Catholicism (official); 9.8 % other Christian; 9.6 % no religion; 6.0 % Islam; 5.0 % other
- Demonym: Liechtensteiner
- Government: Constitutional monarchy
  - Monarch: Hans-Adam II
  - Regent and Heir Apparent: Alois
  - Prime Minister: Brigitte Haas
  - Deputy Prime Minister: Sabine Monauni
- Legislature: Landtag

Independence as principality
  - Union between Vaduz and Schellenberg: 23 January 1719
  - Treaty of Pressburg: 12 July 1806
  - Separation from German Confederation: 23 August 1866

Area
  - Total: 160.50 km^{2} (61.97 sq mi) (190th)
  - Water (%): 2.7

Population
  - 2025 estimate: ▲41,237 (189th)
  - Density: 249/km^{2} (644.9/sq mi) (56th)
- GDP (PPP): 2024 estimate
  - Total: ▲$7.172 billion (169th)
  - Per capita: ▲$210,600
- GDP (nominal): 2023 estimate
  - Total: ▲$8.288 billion (155th)
  - Per capita: ▲$207,974
- HDI (2023): ▲0.938 very high (17th)
- Currency: Swiss franc (CHF)
- Time zone: UTC+01:00 (CET)
  - Summer (DST): UTC+02:00 (CEST)
- Calling code: +423
- ISO 3166 code: LI
- Internet TLD: .li

Liechtenstein (/ˈlɪktənstaɪn/, LIK-tən-stine; German pronunciation: [ˈlɪçtn̩ʃtaɪn]; Alemannic German: Liachtaschta), officially the Principality of Liechtenstein (Fürstentum Liechtenstein [ˈfʏʁstn̩tuːm ˈlɪçtn̩ʃtaɪn]), is a doubly landlocked country in the Central European Alps. A microstate, it is located between Austria to the east and north-east and Switzerland to the north-west, west and south.

Formed in 1719, Liechtenstein became fully independent upon the dissolution of the German Confederation in 1866. Liechtenstein is a monarchy headed by the prince of Liechtenstein. Hans-Adam II, Prince of Liechtenstein has reigned over Liechtenstein since 1989. Liechtenstein is Europe's fourth-smallest country, with an area of just over 160 square kilometres (62 square miles) and a population of 41,389. It is the world's smallest country to border two countries. The official language of Liechtenstein is German.

Liechtenstein is divided into 11 municipalities. Its capital is Vaduz, and its largest municipality is Schaan. It is a member of the United Nations, the European Free Trade Association, and the Council of Europe. It is not a member state of the European Union, but it participates in both the Schengen Area and the European Economic Area. It has a customs union and a monetary union with Switzerland, with its usage of the Swiss franc. It is one of the few countries with no debt. A constitutional referendum in 2003 granted the monarch greater powers, including the power to dismiss the government, nominate judges and veto legislation. This was reaffirmed in 2012. As such, the monarch is not a figurehead. This creates a semi-constitutional monarchy.

Liechtenstein has a strong financial sector centred in Vaduz. It was once known as a billionaire tax haven, culminating in a tax affair in 2008, but the principality has since made significant efforts to shed this reputation. An Alpine country, Liechtenstein is mountainous, making it a winter sport destination.

== History ==
=== Early history ===
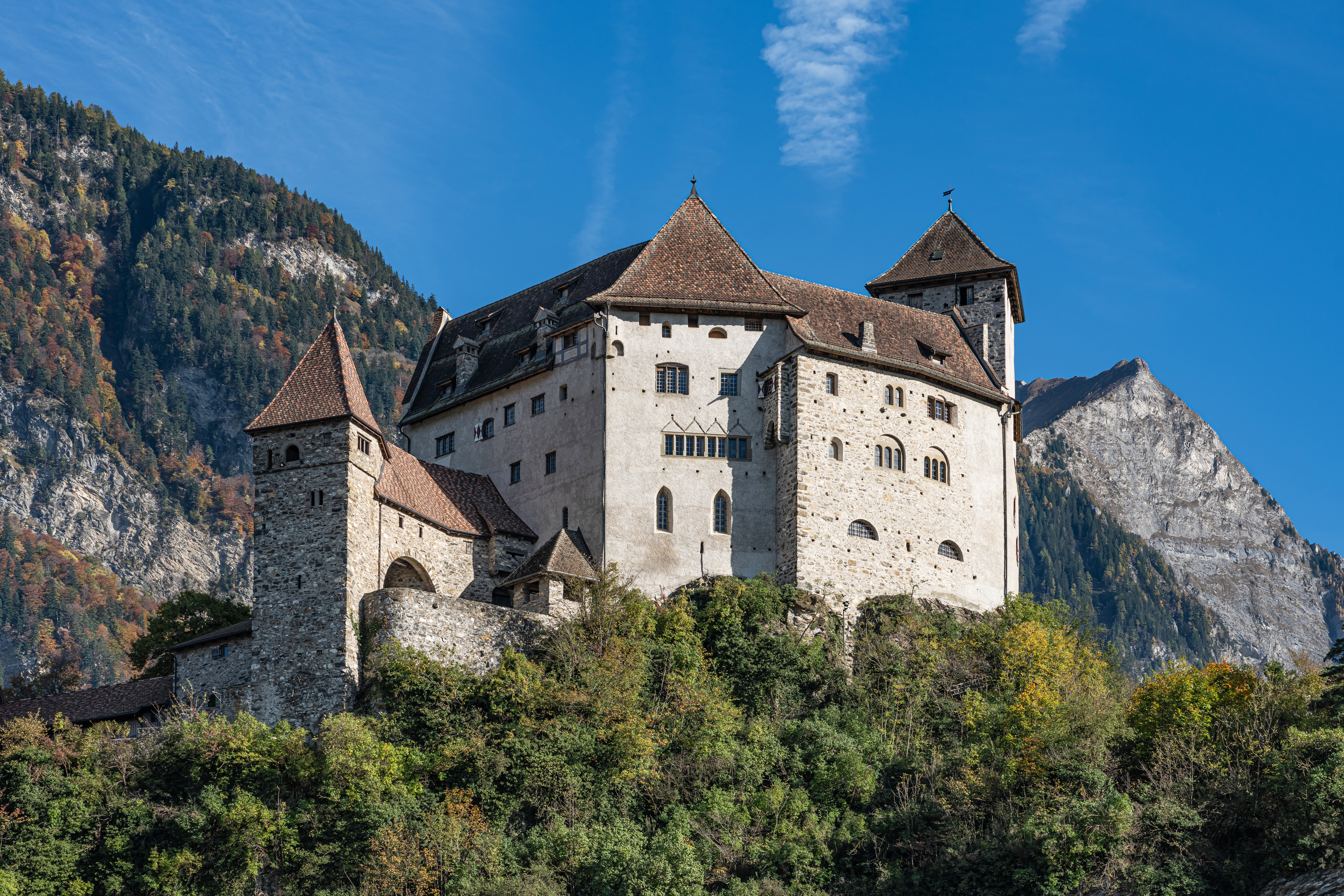
Gutenberg Castle, Balzers

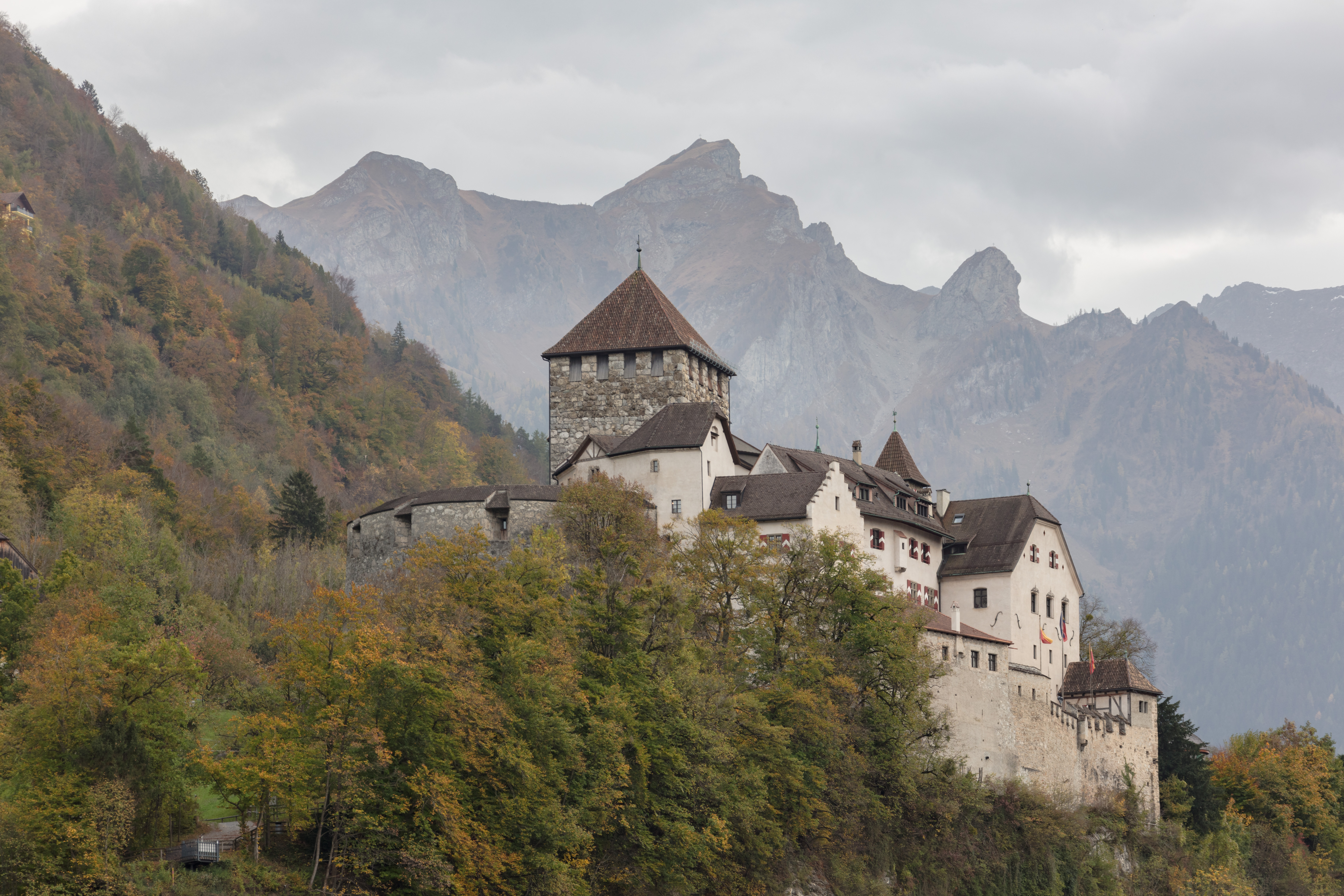
Vaduz Castle, overlooking the capital, is home to the Prince of Liechtenstein.

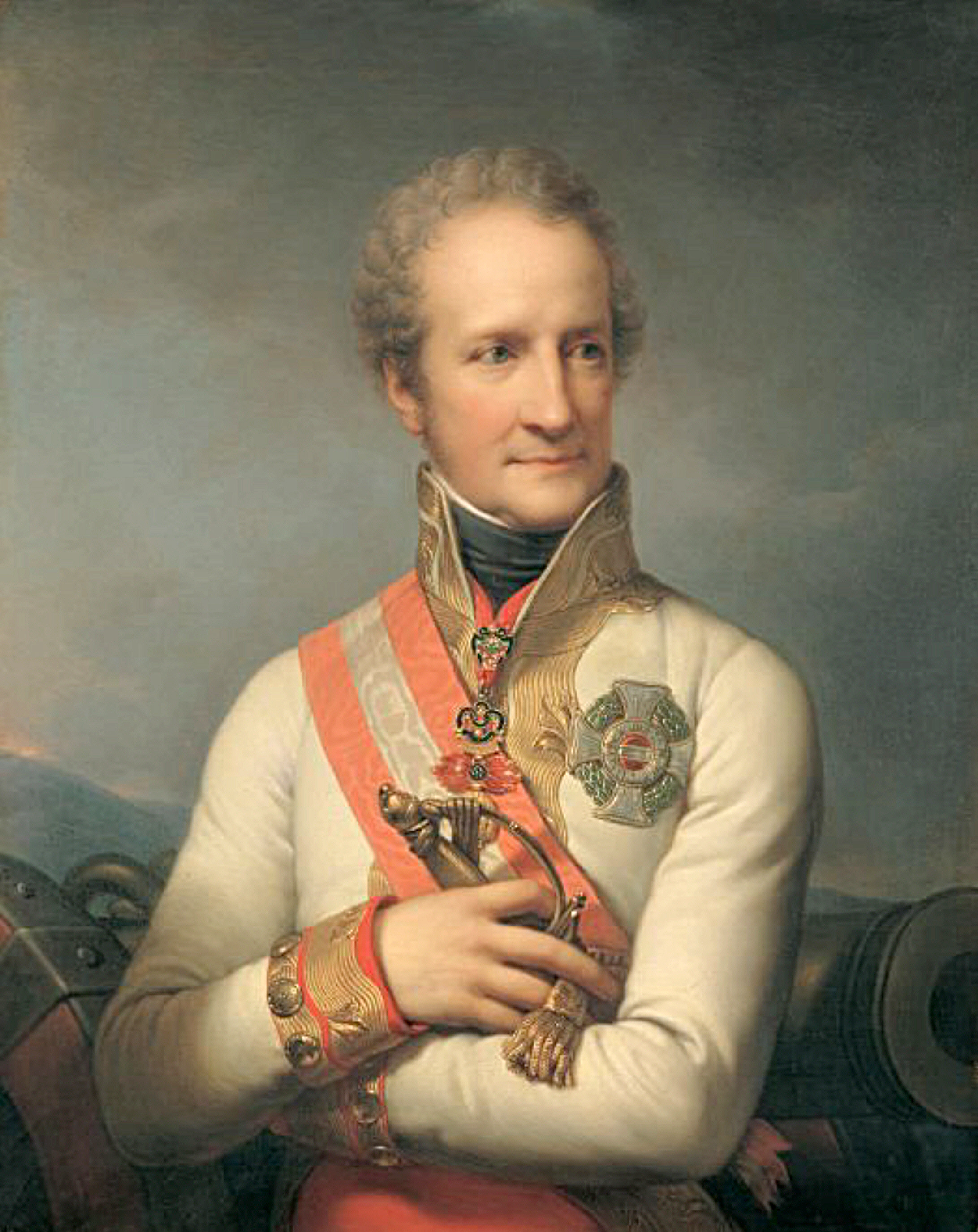
Johann I Joseph, Prince of Liechtenstein from 1805 to 1806 and 1814 to 1836, by Johann Baptist von Lampi the Elder. Liechtenstein Museum, Vienna

The oldest traces of human existence in the area that later became Liechtenstein date back to the Middle Paleolithic era. Neolithic farming settlements appeared in the valleys around 5300 BC.

The Hallstatt and La Tène cultures flourished during the late Iron Age, from around 450 BC—possibly under some influence of both the Greek and Etruscan civilisations. During the Iron Age and into the Roman era, the Vennones occupied the Alpine Rhine valley. In 58 BC, at the Battle of Bibracte, Julius Caesar defeated the Alpine tribes, thereby bringing the region under Roman subjugation. By 15 BC, Tiberius—later the second Roman emperor—with his brother, Drusus, conquered the entire Alpine area.

The lands that would later become known as Liechtenstein then became integrated into the Roman province of Raetia. The area was garrisoned by the Roman army, which maintained large legionary camps at Brigantium (Bregenz, Austria), near Lake Constance, and at Magia (Maienfeld, Switzerland). The Romans built and maintained a road which ran through the territory. Around 260 AD Brigantium was destroyed by the Alemanni, a Germanic people who later settled in the area around 450.

In the Early Middle Ages, the Alemanni settled the eastern Swiss Plateau by the 5th century and the valleys of the Alps by the end of the 8th century. The territory that would later be known as Liechtenstein was located at the eastern edge of Alamannia. In the 6th century, the area became part of the Frankish Empire following Clovis I's victory over the Alemanni at Tolbiac in 504.

The area that later became Liechtenstein remained under Frankish hegemony (Merovingian and Carolingian dynasties) until the Treaty of Verdun divided the Carolingian empire in 843, following the death of Charlemagne in 814. The territory that later became Liechtenstein formed part of East Francia and would later be reunified with Middle Francia under the Holy Roman Empire, around 1000. Until about 1100, the predominant language of the area was Romansch; thereafter, German began to gain ground in the territory. In 1300, another Alemannic population—the Walsers, who originated in Valais—entered the region and settled; the mountain village of Triesenberg today preserves features of the Walser dialect.

By 1200, dominions across the Alpine plateau were controlled by the Houses of Savoy, Zähringer, Habsburg, and Kyburg. Other regions were accorded the Imperial immediacy that granted the empire direct control over the mountain passes. When the Kyburg dynasty fell in 1264, the Habsburgs under King Rudolph I, the Holy Roman Emperor in 1273, extended their territory to the eastern Alpine plateau.

In 1396, Vaduz, which would later become the southern region of Liechtenstein, gained imperial immediacy, i.e. it became subject to the Holy Roman Emperor alone.

=== Foundation of a dynasty ===
The family from which Liechtenstein takes its name originally came from Liechtenstein Castle south of Vienna in Lower Austria, which they had possessed since at least 1140 until the 13th century, and again from 1807 onwards. The Liechtensteins acquired land, predominantly in Moravia, Lower Austria, Silesia, and Styria. As these territories were all held in feudal tenure from more senior feudal lords, particularly various branches of the Habsburgs, the Liechtenstein dynasty was unable to meet a primary requirement to qualify for a seat in the Imperial Diet (parliament), the Reichstag. Even though several Liechtenstein princes served several Habsburg rulers as close advisers, without any territory held directly from the Imperial throne, they held little power in the Holy Roman Empire.

For this reason, the family sought to acquire lands that would be classed as unmittelbar, or held without any intermediate feudal tenure, directly from the Holy Roman Emperor. During the early 17th century, Karl I of Liechtenstein was made a Fürst (prince) by the Holy Roman Emperor Matthias after siding with him in a political battle. Hans-Adam I was allowed to purchase the minuscule Herrschaft ('Lordship') of Schellenberg and the county of Vaduz (in 1699 and 1712, respectively) from the Hohenems. Tiny Schellenberg and Vaduz had exactly the political status required: no feudal superior (suzerain) other than the emperor.

=== Principality of Liechtenstein ===
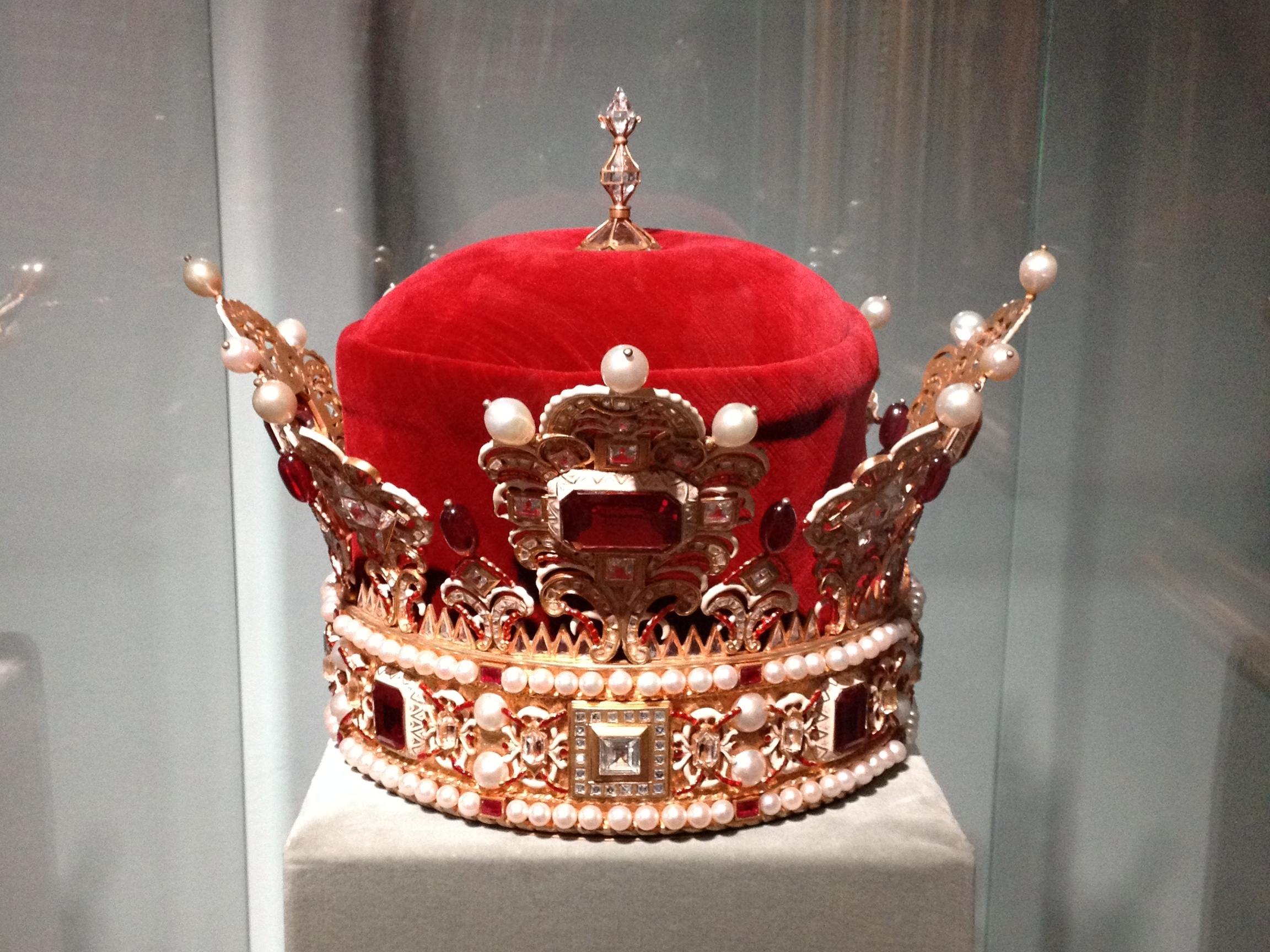
Ducal hat of Liechtenstein

On 23 January 1719, after the lands had been purchased, Charles VI, Holy Roman Emperor, decreed that Vaduz and Schellenberg were united and elevated the newly formed territory to the dignity of Reichsfürstentum (imperial principality) with the name "Liechtenstein" in honour of "[his] true servant, Anton Florian of Liechtenstein". On this date, Liechtenstein became a mostly-sovereign immediate member state of the Holy Roman Empire.

By the early 19th century, as a result of the Napoleonic Wars in Europe, the Holy Roman Empire came under the effective control of France, following the crushing defeat at Austerlitz by Napoleon in 1805. In 1806, Emperor Francis II abdicated and dissolved the Holy Roman Empire, ending more than 960 years of feudal government. Napoleon reorganized much of the Empire into the Confederation of the Rhine. This political restructuring had broad consequences for Liechtenstein: the historical imperial, legal, and political institutions had been dissolved. The state ceased to owe an obligation to any feudal lord beyond its borders.

Due to these events, the prince of Liechtenstein ceased to owe an obligation to any suzerain. From 25 July 1806, when the Confederation of the Rhine was founded, the Prince of Liechtenstein was a member, in fact a vassal, of its hegemon, styled protector, the French Emperor Napoleon I, until the dissolution of the confederation on 19 October 1813. Soon afterward, Liechtenstein joined the German Confederation (20 June 1815 – 23 August 1866), which was presided over by the Emperor of Austria.

In 1818, Prince Johann I granted the territory a limited constitution. In that same year Prince Aloys became the first member of the House of Liechtenstein to set foot in the principality that bore their name. The next visit would not occur until 1842.

In 1862, a new constitution was adopted.

Upon the dissolution of the German Confederation in 1866, Liechtenstein became fully independent.

The Liechtenstein Army was abolished for financial reasons in February 1868.

Other developments during the 19th century included the following:

- 1872: A railway line between Switzerland and the Austro-Hungarian Empire was constructed through Liechtenstein.
- 1884: Johann II appointed Carl von In der Maur, an Austrian aristocrat, to serve as the Governor of Liechtenstein.
- 1886: Two bridges over the Rhine to Switzerland were built.

=== 20th and 21st centuries ===
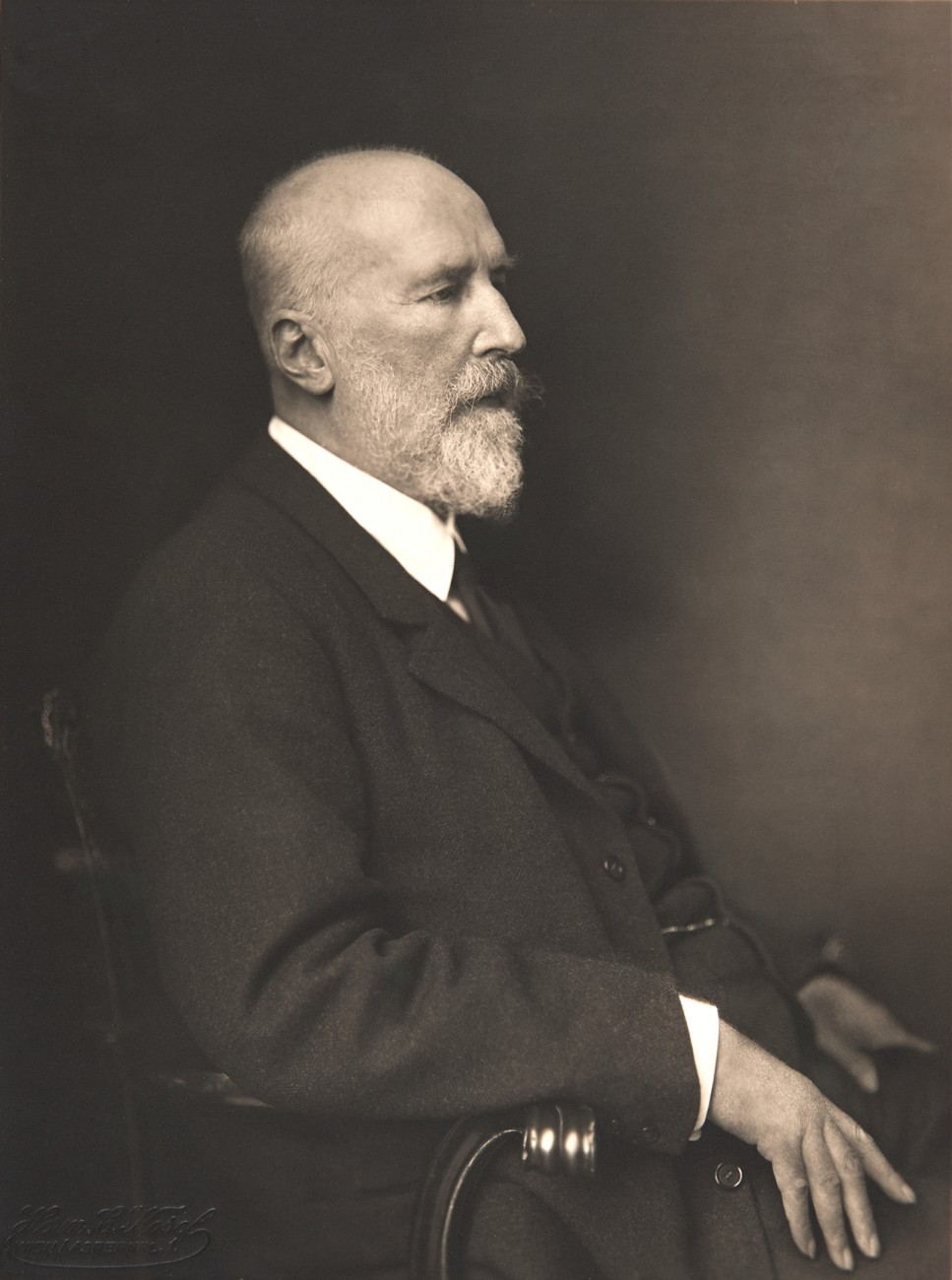
Franz I, Prince of Liechtenstein from 1929 to 1938

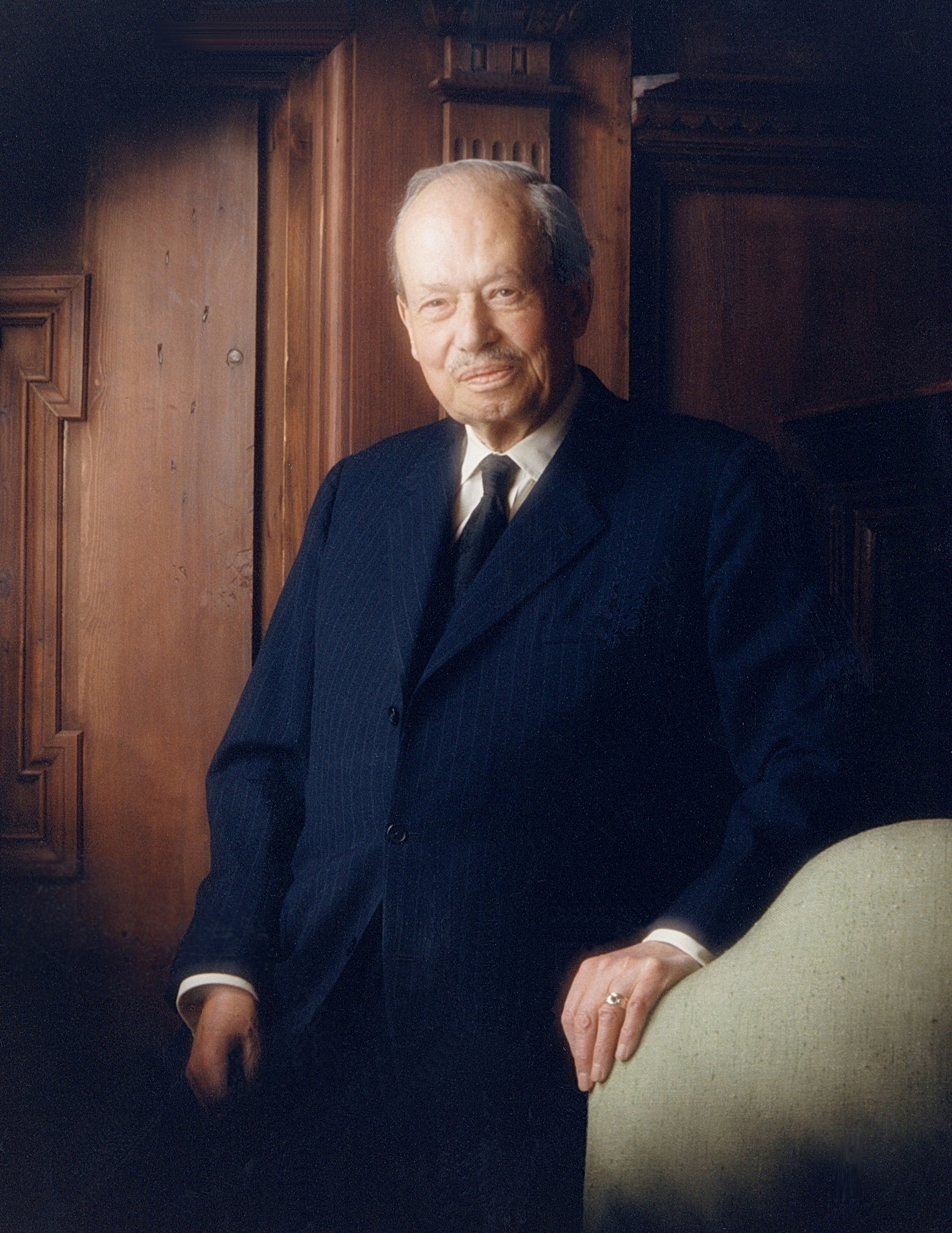
Franz Joseph II, Prince of Liechtenstein from 1938 to 1989

Until the end of World War I, Liechtenstein was closely tied first to the Austrian Empire and later to Austria-Hungary; the ruling princes continued to derive much of their wealth from estates in the Habsburg territories, and spent much of their time at their two palaces in Vienna. During World War I it did officially stay neutral, but was dependent on its neighbours and some, like Prince Heinrich of Liechtenstein got involved working for Austria-Hungary. The economic devastation caused by World War I forced the country to conclude a customs and monetary union with its other neighbour, Switzerland. In addition, popular unrest caused from economic devastation in the war directly led to the November 1918 Liechtenstein putsch, which created the process of a new constitution based on constitutional monarchy being introduced in 1921.

In 1929, 75-year-old Prince Franz I succeeded to the throne. He had just married Elisabeth von Gutmann, a wealthy woman from Vienna whose father was a Jewish businessman from Moravia. Although Liechtenstein had no official Nazi party, a Nazi sympathy movement arose within its National Union party. Local Liechtenstein Nazis identified Elisabeth as their Jewish "problem". Pro-Nazi agitation remained in Liechtenstein throughout the 1930s.

In March 1938, just after the annexation of Austria by Nazi Germany, Franz named as regent his 31-year-old grandnephew and heir-presumptive, Prince Franz Joseph. After making his grandnephew regent he moved to Feldsberg, Czechoslovakia and on 25 July, he died while at one of his family's castles, Castle Feldberg, and Franz Joseph formally succeeded him as the Prince of Liechtenstein.

In March 1939 a coup was attempted while Franz Joseph II was on a state visit to Berlin.

During World War II, Liechtenstein remained officially neutral, looking to neighbouring Switzerland for assistance and guidance, while family treasures from dynastic lands and possessions in Bohemia, Moravia, and Silesia were taken to Liechtenstein for safekeeping. Operation Tannenbaum, the Nazi plan for conquest of Switzerland, also included Liechtenstein, and the Nazi "Pan German" dream of uniting all German-speakers in the Reich would have also included the population of Liechtenstein. However in 1944, the Nazis abandoned implementing this plan after the Allied invasion of France, and Liechtenstein was spared from enduring a Nazi occupation.

At the close of the conflict, Czechoslovakia and Poland, acting to seize what they considered German possessions, expropriated all of the Liechtenstein dynasty's properties in Bohemia, Moravia, and Silesia. The expropriations (subject to modern legal dispute at the International Court of Justice) included over 1,600 km^{2} (618 sq mi) of agricultural and forest land (most notably the UNESCO listed Lednice–Valtice Cultural Landscape), and several family castles and palaces.

Liechtenstein was in dire financial straits following the end of World War II. The Liechtenstein dynasty often resorted to selling family artistic treasures, including the portrait Ginevra de' Benci by Leonardo da Vinci, which was purchased by the National Gallery of Art of the United States in 1967 for US$5 million ($48 million in 2025 dollars), then a record price for a painting.

Citizens of Liechtenstein were forbidden to enter Czechoslovakia during the Cold War. The diplomatic conflict revolving around the controversial postwar Beneš decrees resulted in Liechtenstein not having international relations with the Czech Republic or Slovakia. Diplomatic relations were established between Liechtenstein and the Czech Republic on 13 July 2009, and with Slovakia on 9 December 2009.

The Constitution of Liechtenstein was amended in March 2003 to give additional powers to the monarch.

In 2004, Prince Hans-Adam II transferred day-to-day governmental duties to his eldest son Hereditary Prince Alois as regent, as his father had done to him in 1984 to prepare him for the role of Prince.

In 2005, a government-commissioned investigation revealed that Jewish slave labourers from the Strasshof concentration camp, provided by the SS, had worked on estates in Austria owned by Liechtenstein's Princely House. The report indicated that though no evidence was found of the House's knowledge of the slave labour, the House bore responsibility.

== Geography ==
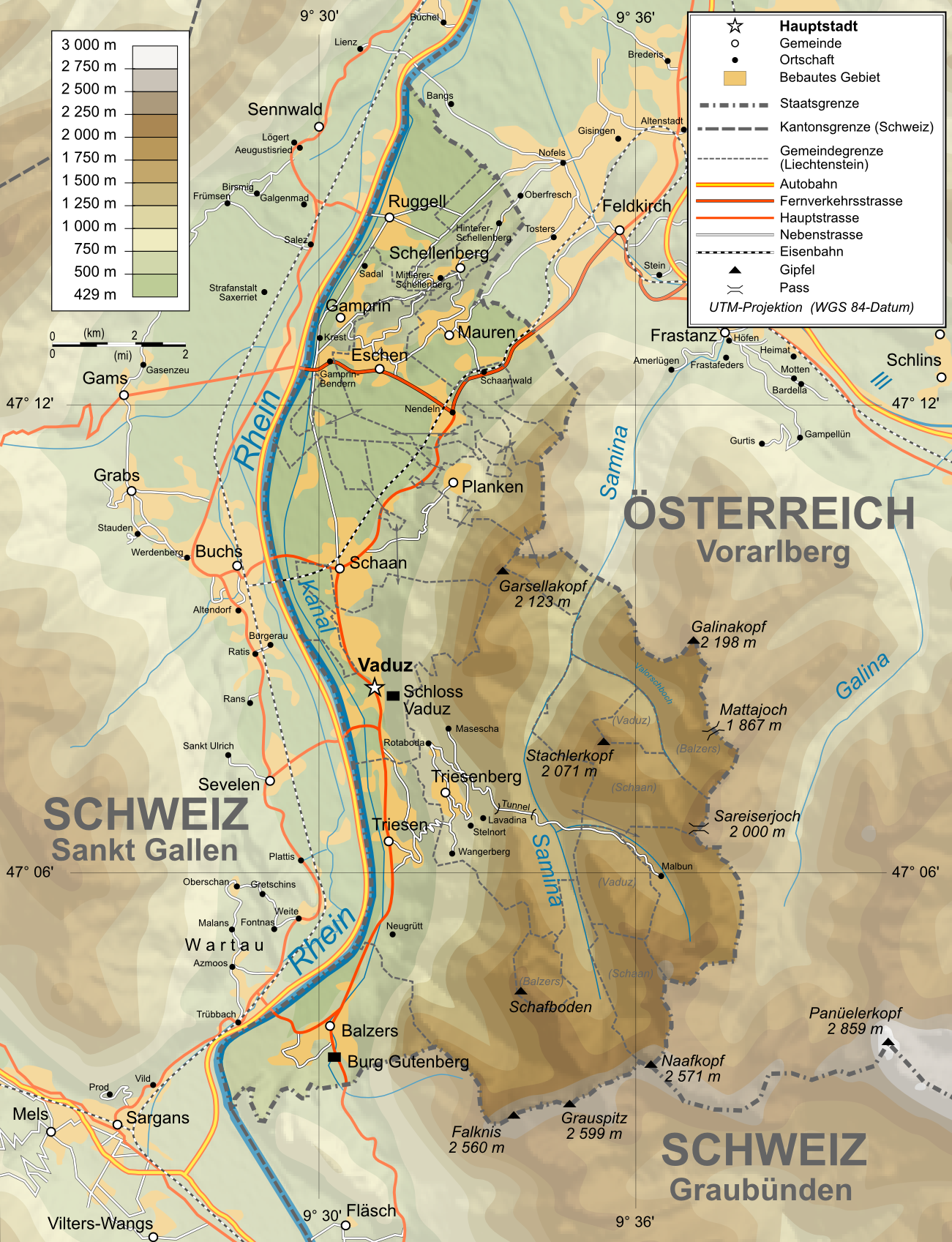
Topographic map of Liechtenstein in German

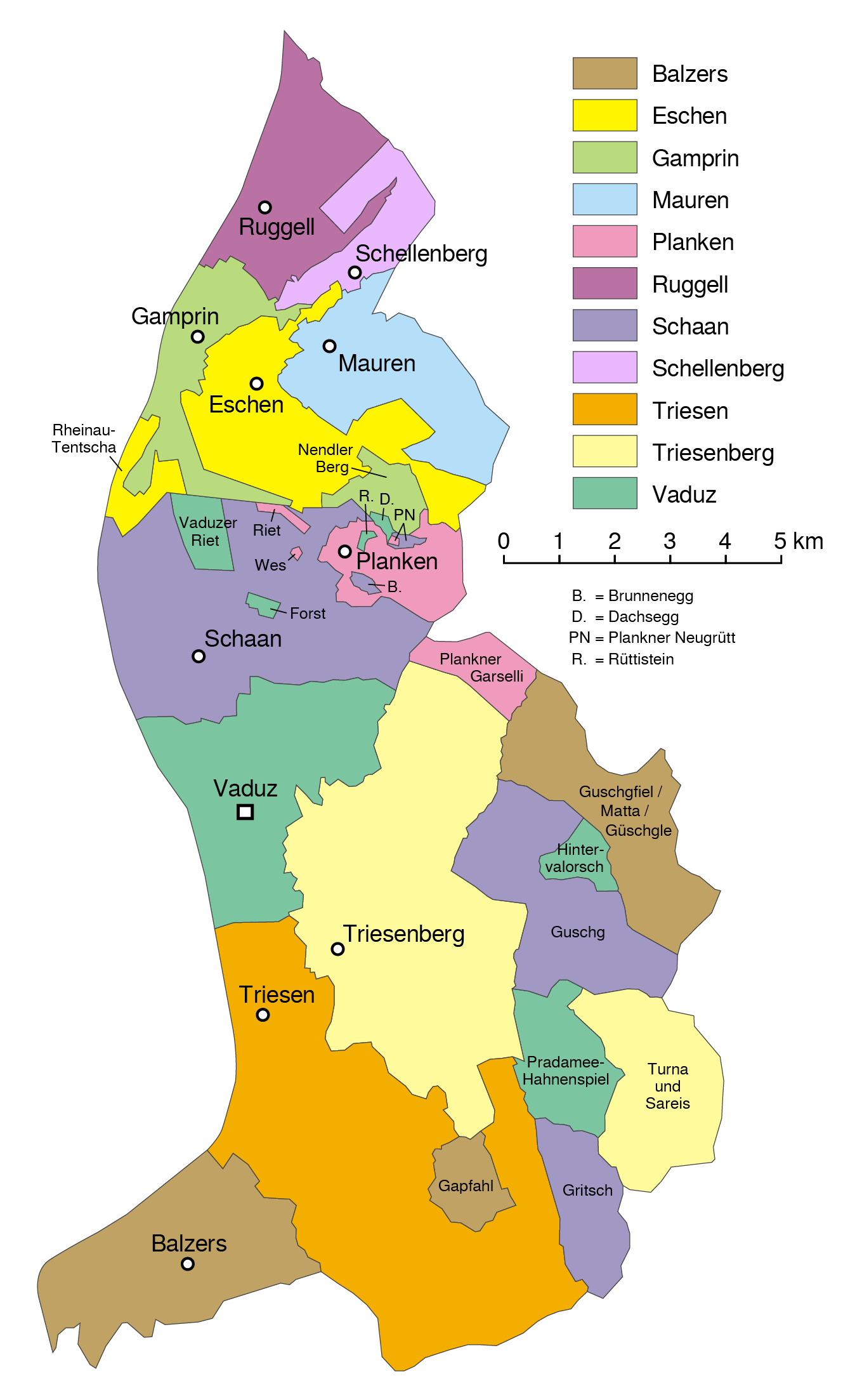
Administrative divisions of Liechtenstein, showing numerous exclaves

Liechtenstein is situated in the Upper Rhine valley of the European Alps and is bordered to the east by the Austrian state of Vorarlberg, to the south by the canton of Grisons and to the west by the canton of St. Gallen (both in Switzerland). The Rhine forms the entire western border of Liechtenstein. Measured south to north the country is about 24 km (15 mi) long. New surveys using more accurate measurements of the country's borders in 2006 have set its area at 160 km^{2} (62 sq mi), with borders of 77.9 km (48.4 mi). As a result, Liechtenstein's area is slightly larger by 0.5 km^{2} (0.2 sq mi) and its borders are 1.9 km (1.2 mi) longer than previously thought.

Liechtenstein is one of the world's two doubly landlocked countries – countries wholly surrounded by other landlocked countries (the other is Uzbekistan). Liechtenstein is the sixth-smallest sovereign state in the world by area.

The principality of Liechtenstein is divided into 11 communes called Gemeinden (singular Gemeinde). The Gemeinden mostly consist of only a single town or village. Five of them (Eschen, Gamprin, Mauren, Ruggell, and Schellenberg) fall within the electoral district Unterland (the lower county), and the remainder (Balzers, Planken, Schaan, Triesen, Triesenberg, and Vaduz) within Oberland (the upper county).

The World Bank did not include Liechtenstein on its list of 50 "small states" by its inclusion criteria.

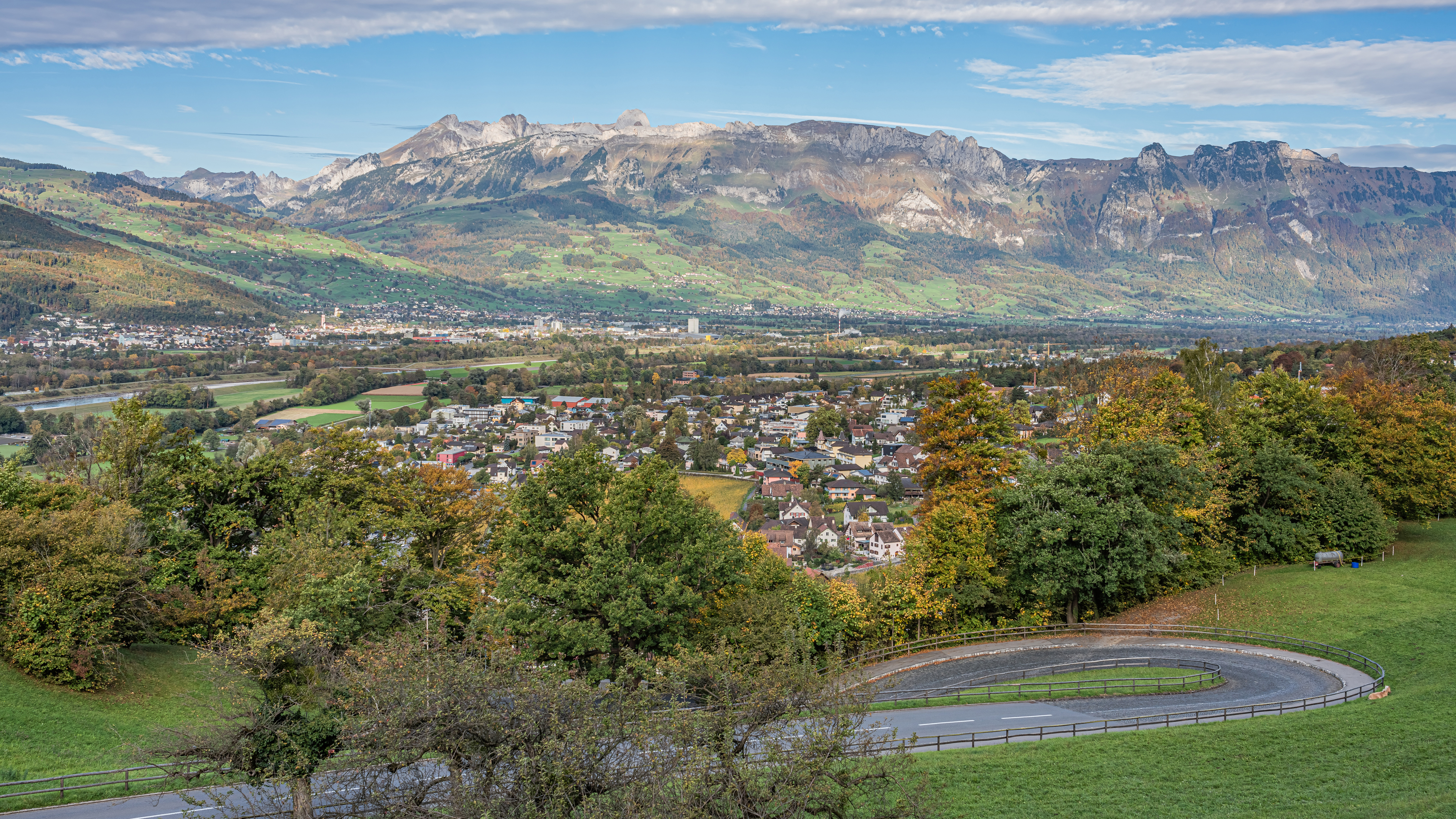
Vaduz, Liechtenstein

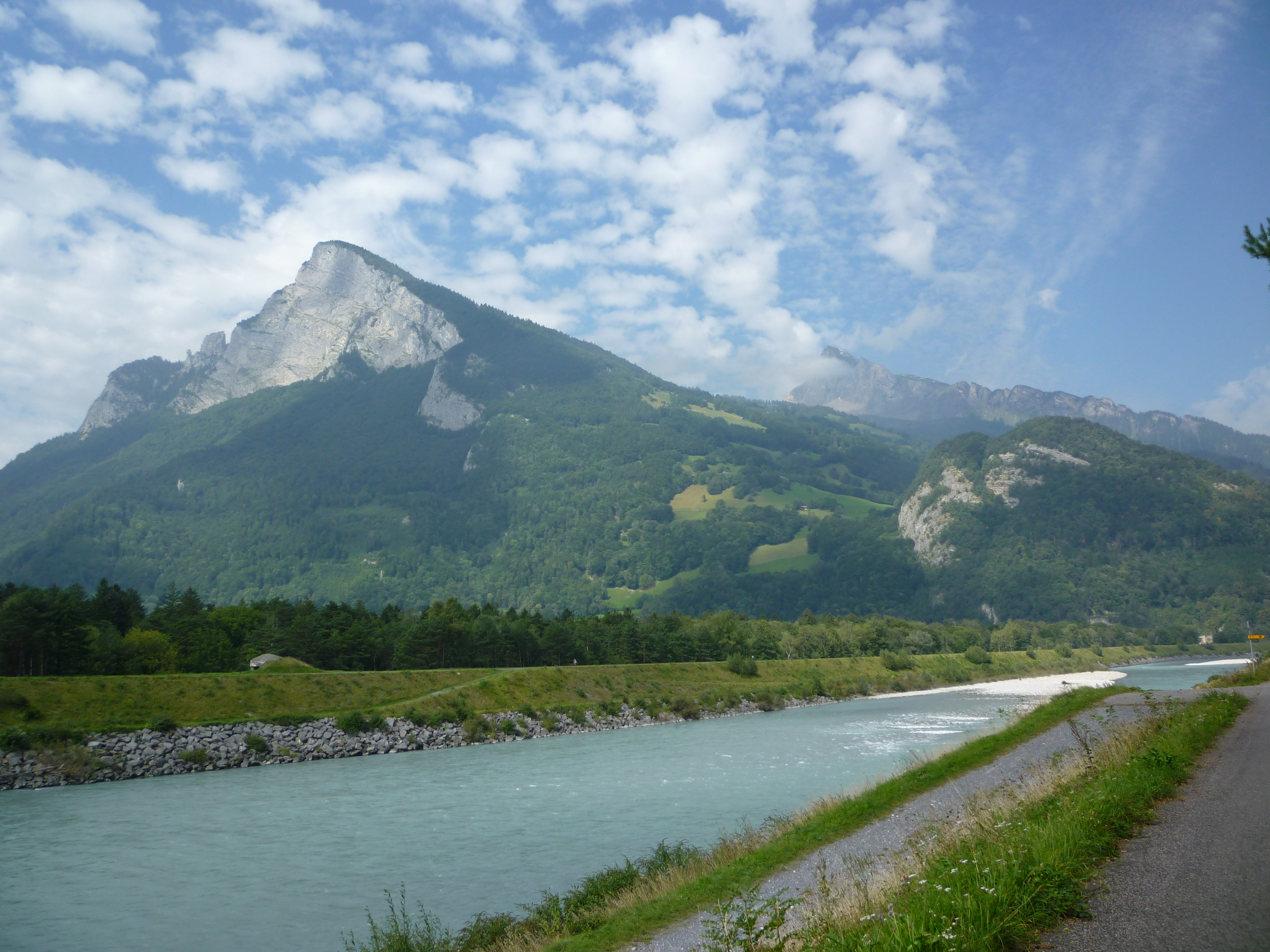
The Alpine Rhine border between Liechtenstein and Switzerland (view towards the Swiss Alps)

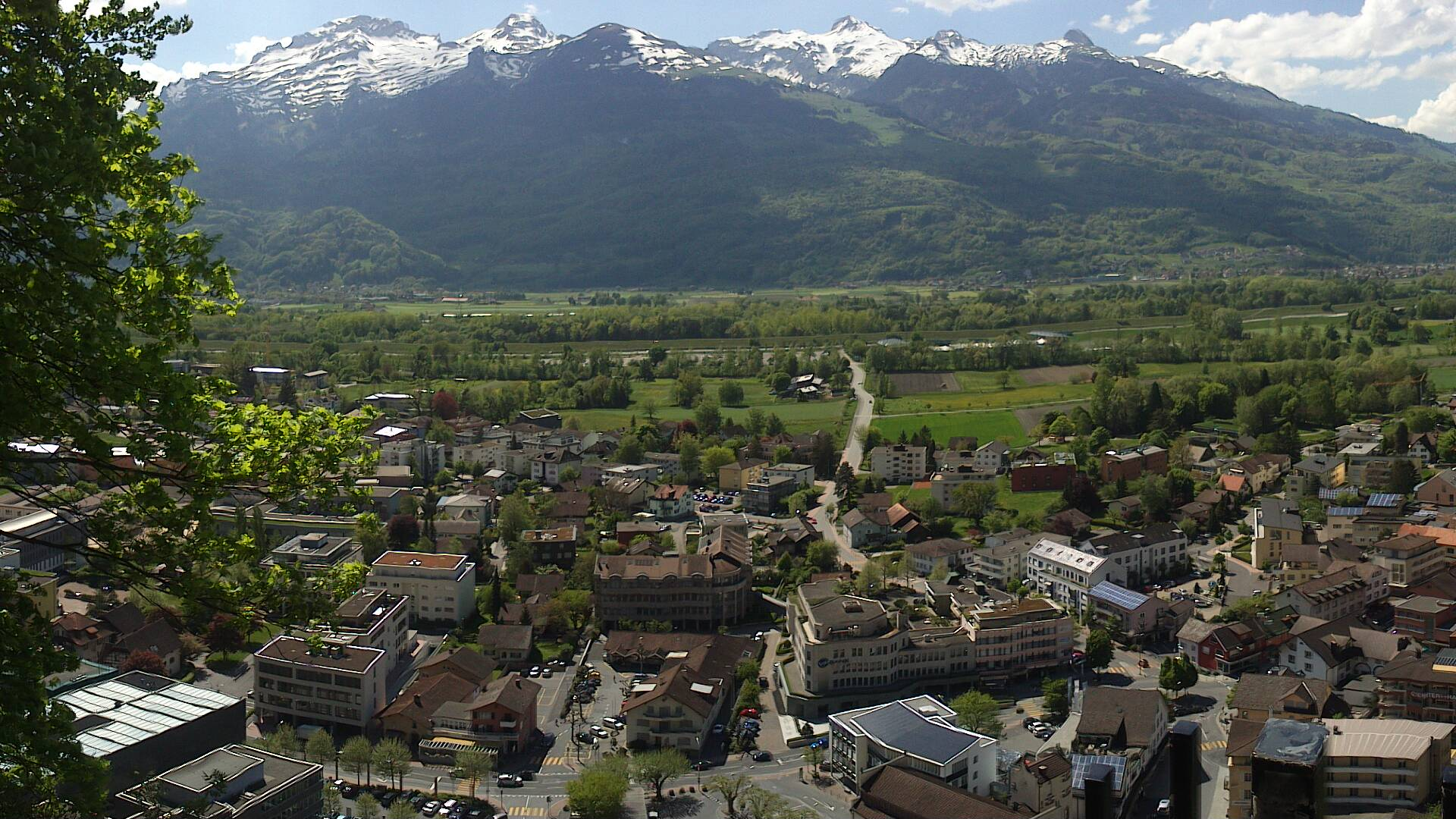
Panorama of Vaduz, capital of Liechtenstein

=== Climate ===
Despite its alpine location, the prevailing southerly winds temper Liechtenstein's climate. Its climate is continental, with cloudy and cold winters, with frequent rain and snowfall. Summers are cool to slightly warm, cloudy, and humid.

The country's climate is relatively mild despite its mountainous location. It is strongly influenced by the action of foehn (warm and dry autumn wind), so the vegetation period is prolonged in spring and autumn and temperatures around 15 °C (59 °F) due to the strong foehn are not uncommon even in winter. The mountain ranges of Switzerland and the Vorarlberg upstream protect from the cold polar and Atlantic air, creating a typical alpine inland protective layer. The principality has orchards with leafy meadows and a long tradition of viticulture. Liechtenstein's small land area hardly plays a role in climatic differences, but the vertical division into different altitudes is of great importance, so that significant climatic differences arise.

In winter the temperature rarely drops below −15 °C (5 °F), while in summer the average temperatures range between 20 and 28 °C (68 and 82 °F). Annual precipitation measurements amount to an average of about 900 to 1,200 millimetres (35 to 47 in), in the direct alpine region, however, precipitation is often up to 1,900 mm (75 in). The average duration of sunshine is about 1600 hours per year.

Climate data for Vaduz (1991–2020 normals)
Month	Jan	Feb	Mar	Apr	May	Jun	Jul	Aug	Sep	Oct	Nov	Dec	Year
Mean daily maximum °C (°F)	5.0 (41.0)	6.8 (44.2)	11.8 (53.2)	16.0 (60.8)	20.1 (68.2)	23.2 (73.8)	24.9 (76.8)	24.3 (75.7)	20.0 (68.0)	15.7 (60.3)	9.5 (49.1)	5.5 (41.9)	15.2 (59.4)
Daily mean °C (°F)	1.4 (34.5)	2.7 (36.9)	6.8 (44.2)	10.7 (51.3)	14.7 (58.5)	17.9 (64.2)	19.4 (66.9)	19.1 (66.4)	15.0 (59.0)	11.1 (52.0)	5.7 (42.3)	2.2 (36.0)	10.6 (51.1)
Mean daily minimum °C (°F)	−2.0 (28.4)	−1.1 (30.0)	2.3 (36.1)	5.6 (42.1)	9.7 (49.5)	13.0 (55.4)	14.6 (58.3)	14.6 (58.3)	10.8 (51.4)	6.9 (44.4)	2.2 (36.0)	−1.1 (30.0)	6.3 (43.3)
Average precipitation mm (inches)	41 (1.6)	34 (1.3)	54 (2.1)	57 (2.2)	90 (3.5)	116 (4.6)	130 (5.1)	144 (5.7)	96 (3.8)	68 (2.7)	56 (2.2)	54 (2.1)	940 (37.0)
Average snowfall cm (inches)	14.2 (5.6)	14.4 (5.7)	6.4 (2.5)	0.4 (0.2)	0.0 (0.0)	0.0 (0.0)	0.0 (0.0)	0.0 (0.0)	0.0 (0.0)	0.0 (0.0)	4.7 (1.9)	11.9 (4.7)	52.0 (20.5)
Average precipitation days (≥ 1.0 mm)	7.4	6.6	9.0	8.9	11.8	12.9	13.2	13.3	10.1	8.7	8.7	8.7	119.3
Average snowy days (≥ 1.0 cm)	3.9	3.9	2.1	0.2	0.0	0.0	0.0	0.0	0.0	0.0	1.4	3.3	14.8
Average relative humidity (%)	75	69	66	63	67	70	71	74	76	76	77	77	72
Mean monthly sunshine hours	72	92	131	156	168	181	197	183	147	114	67	53	1,563
Percentage possible sunshine	40	44	47	49	46	48	52	54	52	48	36	34	47
Source: MeteoSwiss (snow 1981–2010)

=== Rivers and lakes ===
The Rhine is the longest and largest body of water in Liechtenstein. With a length of approximately 27 kilometres (17 mi), it represents the natural border with Switzerland and is of great importance for Liechtenstein's water supply. Furthermore, the Rhine is an important recreational area for the population.

At 10 kilometres (6 mi), the Samina is the second-longest river in the Principality. This whitewater river begins at Triesenberg and flows into the Ill in Austria (near Feldkirch).

The only naturally-formed lake in Liechtenstein is the Gampriner Seelein, which was formed in 1927 by a flooding of the Rhine with enormous erosion. In addition, there are other artificially-created lakes, which are mainly used to generate electricity. One of them is the Steg Reservoir, the largest lake in Liechtenstein.

In 1943, an inland canal was built parallel to the Rhine, starting at the southern end of the country and emptying into the Rhine at the northern end.

=== Mountains ===
About half of Liechtenstein's territory is mountainous. Liechtenstein lies entirely in the Rhaetikon and is thus – depending on the classification of the Alps – assigned either to the Eastern Alps (two-part division of the Alps) or to the Central Alps (three-part division of the Alps).

The highest point of Liechtenstein is the Grauspitz (Vordergrauspitz) with an altitude of 2,599 m (8,527 ft) above sea level, while the lowest point is the Ruggeller Riet with an altitude of 430 metres (1,410 ft) above sea level.

In total, there are 32 mountains in Liechtenstein with an altitude of at least 2,000 metres (6,562 ft). The Falknishorn, at 2,452 metres (8,045 ft) above sea level, is the fifth highest mountain in Liechtenstein and represents the southernmost point of the country. The Liechtenstein–Graubünden–Vorarlberg border triangle is the Naafkopf (2,570 m (8,430 ft) above sea level).

In addition to the peaks of the Alpine chain, which belong to the Limestone Alps, two inselbergs, Fläscherberg (1,135 m or 3,724 ft above sea level) in the south and Eschnerberg (698 m or 2,290 ft) in the north, rise from the Rhine Valley and belong to the Helvetic cover or flysch zone of the Alps. Eschnerberg represents an important settlement area in the Liechtenstein Unterland.

== Government and politics ==
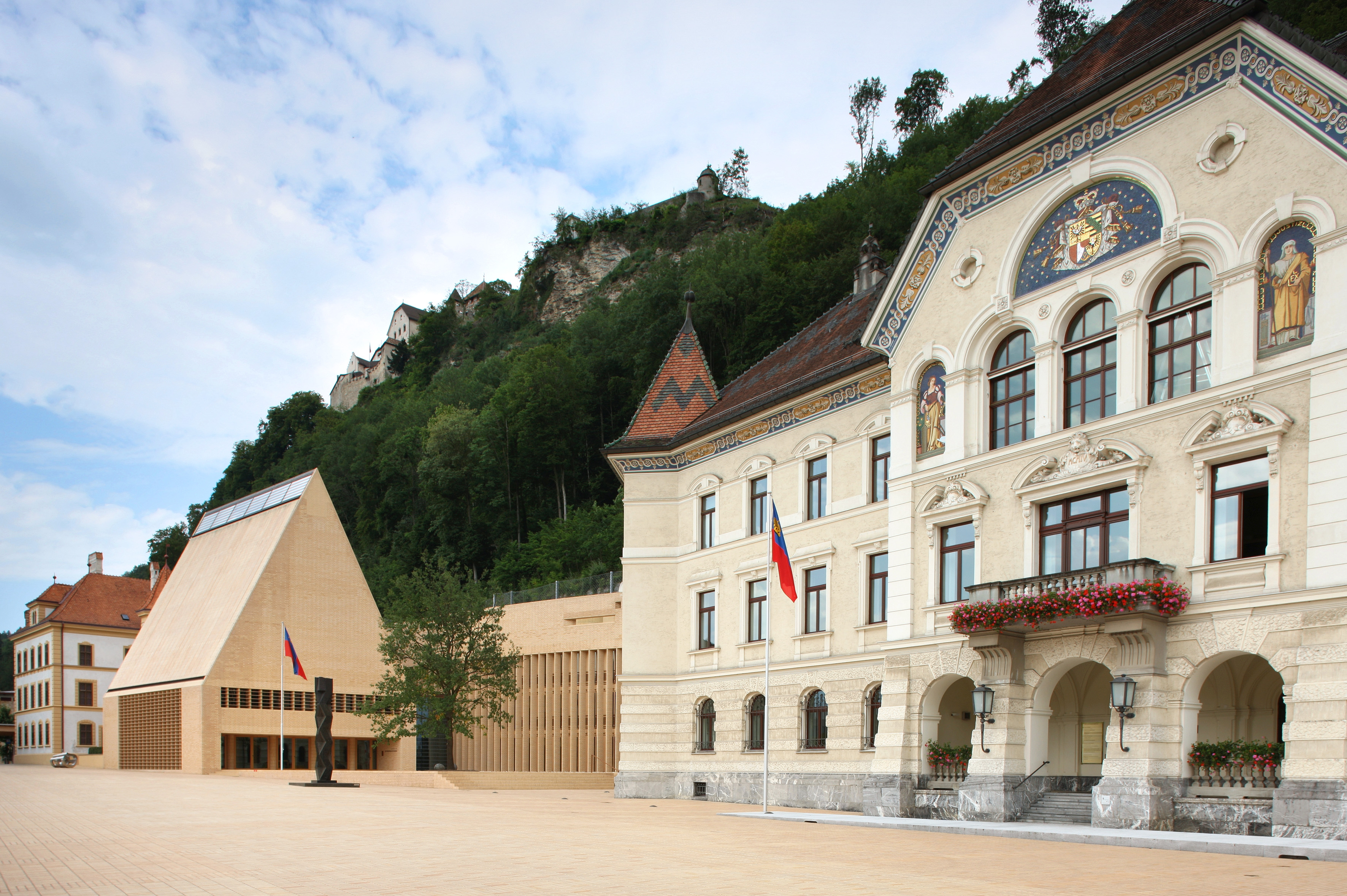
The centre of government in Vaduz

=== Politics ===
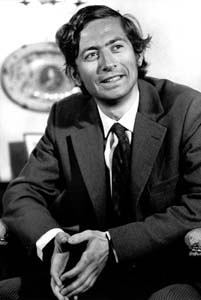
Hans-Adam II, Prince of Liechtenstein in 1974

Liechtenstein has a distinctive political system within Europe, combining elements of absolute monarchy, representative democracy, and direct democracy. The reigning prince retains extensive executive and legislative powers, and exercises considerable influence over the daily conduct of politics and across all three branches of government. Representative and direct democratic mechanisms operate concurrently: an elected parliament enacts legislation, while citizens can propose and adopt laws and constitutional changes independently of the legislature. The Prince serves as the head of state and represents Liechtenstein in its international relations, although Switzerland assumes responsibility for much of the country's diplomatic relations.

In March 2003, a constitutional referendum approved amendments that expanded the prince's prerogatives, granting him broad veto authority, the power to dismiss the government, and the capacity to rule by emergency decree. The BBC characterised the resulting institutional framework as making Liechtenstein "Europe's only absolute monarchy". Both the 2003 expansion of princely powers and their reaffirmation in 2012 were approved by substantial majorities in high-turnout referendums. The Venice commission of the Council of Europe issued an extensive report concluding that several provisions were incompatible with prevailing European democratic standards. A further constitutional referendum in 2012 reaffirmed the prince's powers, with 76% of voters rejecting a proposal to limit the princely veto over legislation approved by referendum. In 2025, Freedom House's Freedom in the World survey ranked Liechtenstein 64th out of 194 countries for political rights and 20th for civil liberties, noting that despite the prince's significant political role, human rights and civil liberties are generally well protected.

Legislative authority is vested in the unicameral Landtag, made up of 25 members elected for maximum four-year terms according to a proportional representation formula. Fifteen members are elected from the Oberland (Upper Country or region) and ten from the Unterland (Lower Country or region). Parties must receive at least 8% of the national vote to win seats in parliament, i.e., enough for two seats in the 25-seat legislature. Parliament proposes and approves a government, which the Prince formally appoints. Parliament may also pass votes of no confidence in the entire government or individual members.

The government comprises the head of government (prime minister) and four government councillors (ministers), who are appointed by the Prince upon the proposal of parliament and with its concurrence, and reflect the balance of parties in parliament. The constitution stipulates that at least two government members be chosen from each of the two regions. The members of the government are collectively and individually responsible to parliament; parliament may ask the Prince to remove an individual minister or the entire government, or the Prince may do so unilaterally.

Parliament elects from among its members a "Landesausschuss" (National Committee) made up of the president of the parliament and four additional members. The National Committee is charged with performing functions of parliamentary supervision. Parliament shares the authority to propose new legislation with the Prince, and with the citizenry, as both parliament and the citizenry may initiate referendums.

Judicial authority is vested in the ordinary courts (the Regional Court at Vaduz in the first instance, the Princely High Court of Appeal at Vaduz in the second instance, and the Princely Supreme Court as a court of last resort), the Administrative Court, and the Constitutional Court. The Constitutional Court rules on the conformity of laws with the constitution and has five members (and five alternates) appointed by the Reigning Prince.

=== Foreign relations ===
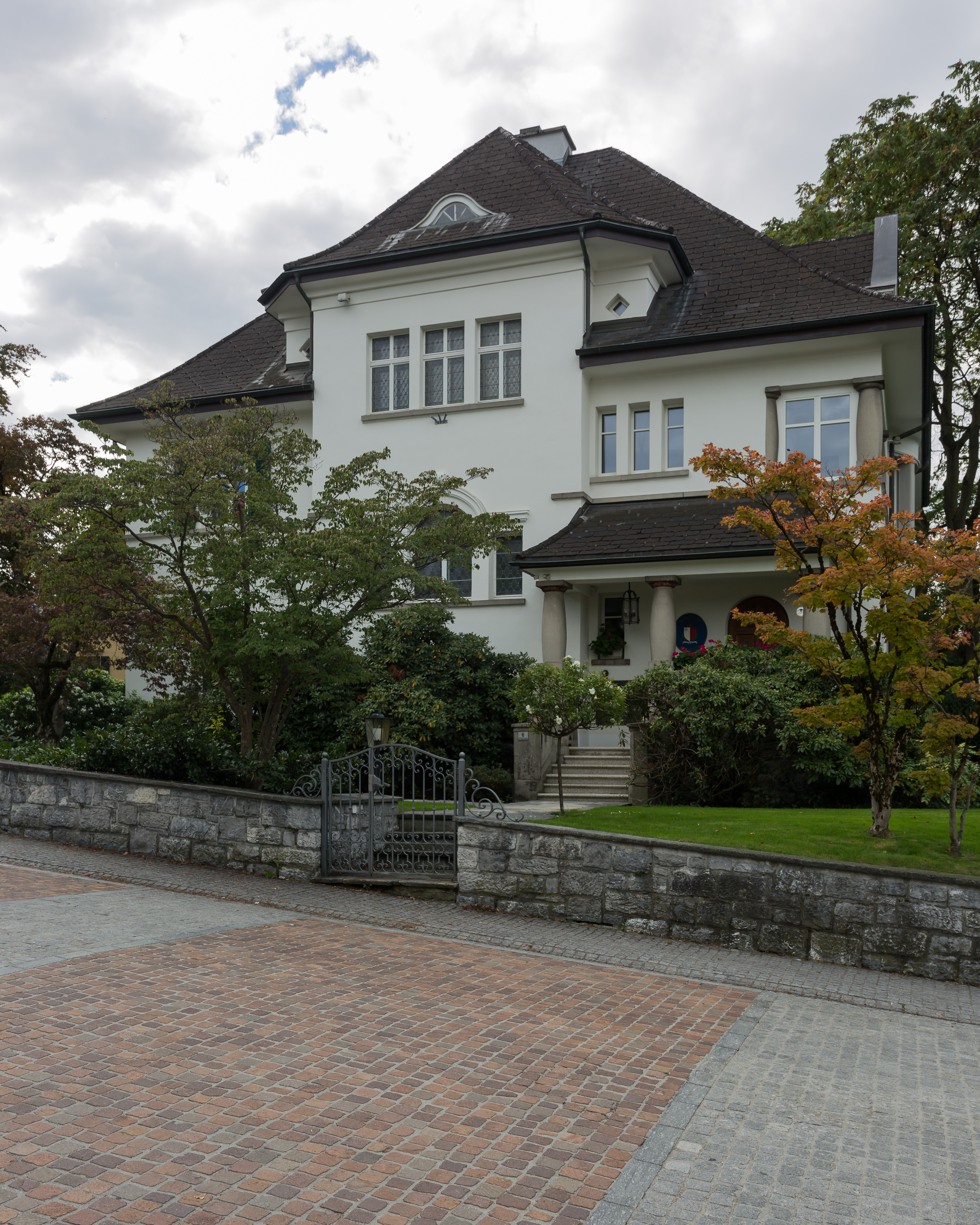
Maltese consulate in Schaan

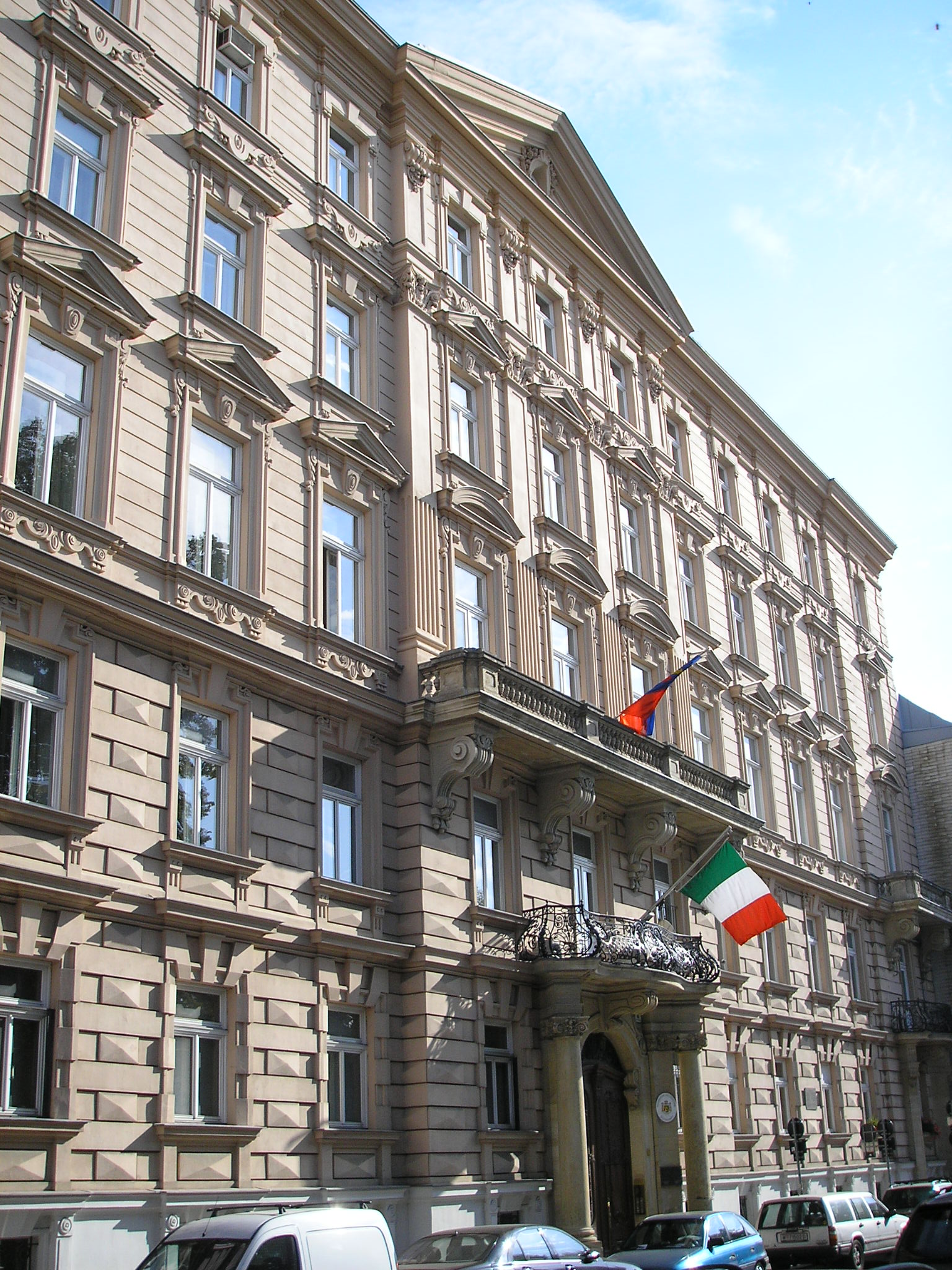
Liechtenstein's Embassy in Vienna

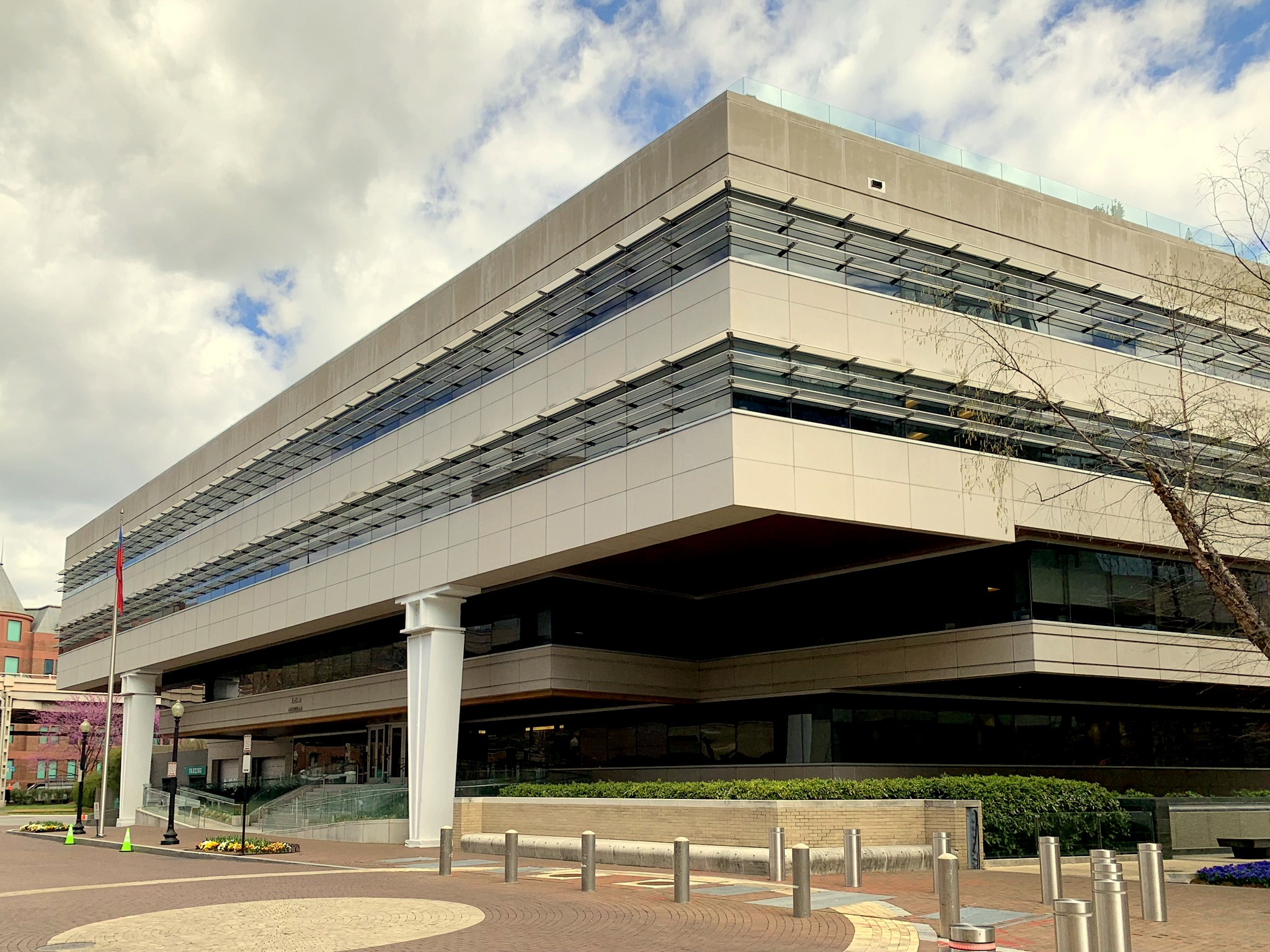
Building hosting Liechtenstein's Embassy in Washington, D.C.

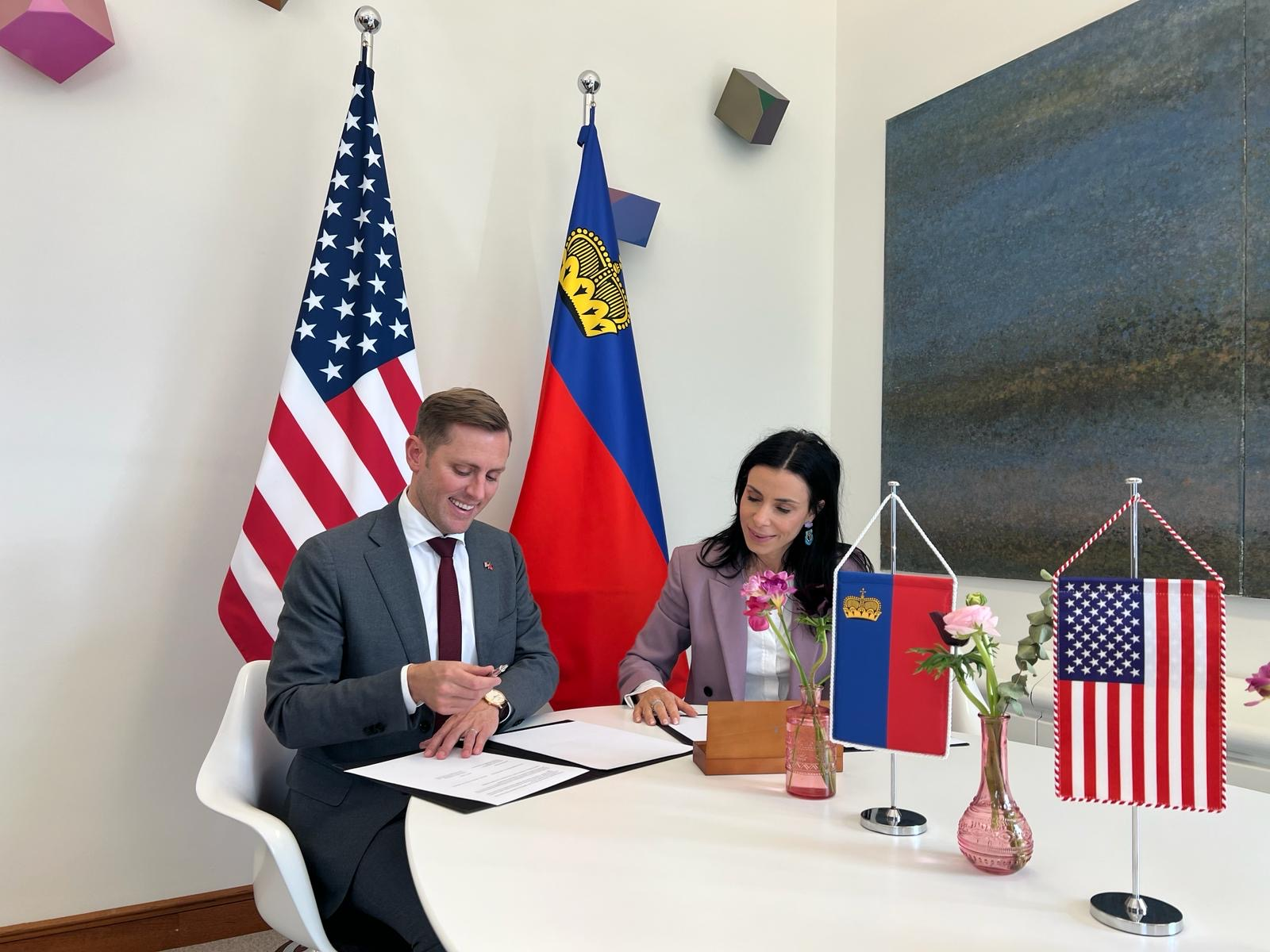
Representatives of the Principality of Liechtenstein and the United States of America make an agreement to share knowledge in the Field of Apprenticeship Training, 2024.

In the absence of political or military power, Liechtenstein has sought to preserve its sovereignty over the past 300 years through membership in legal communities. International cooperation and European integration are therefore constants of Liechtenstein's foreign policy, aimed at continuing to safeguard the country's sovereignty as recognized under international law. Decisive for the domestic legitimacy and sustainability of this foreign policy were and are strong direct-democratic and citizen-oriented decision-making mechanisms, which are anchored in Liechtenstein in the Constitution of 1921.

Important historical stages in Liechtenstein's integration and cooperation policy were its accession to the Confederation of the Rhine in 1806, to the German Confederation in 1815, the conclusion of bilateral customs and currency agreements with the Habsburg monarchy in 1852, and finally the Customs Treaty with Switzerland in 1923, which was followed by a range of other important bilateral treaties.

Post-war economic reconstruction was followed by accession to the Statute of the International Court of Justice in 1950, Liechtenstein signed the CSCE Helsinki Final Act (today's OSCE) together with 34 other states in 1975, Liechtenstein joined the Council of Europe in 1978, and Liechtenstein was admitted to the United Nations (UN) on 18 September 1990. In 1991, Liechtenstein joined the European Free Trade Association (EFTA) as a full member, and since 1995 Liechtenstein has been a member of the European Economic Area (EEA) and the World Trade Organization (WTO).

In 2008, Liechtenstein joined the Schengen/Dublin Agreement together with Switzerland. From an economic and integration policy perspective, relations within the framework of the EEA and the EU occupy a special position in Liechtenstein's foreign policy. The Hereditary Prince of Liechtenstein also participates in the annual meetings of the heads of state of the German-speaking countries (consisting of EU and non-EU members).

Relations with Switzerland are particularly extensive because of the close cooperation in many areas; Switzerland performs tasks in some places that would be difficult for the Principality to handle on its own because of its small size. Since 2000, Switzerland has appointed an ambassador to Liechtenstein, but he resides in Bern. Liechtenstein's consular representation has been mostly handled by Switzerland since the Customs Treaty with Switzerland of 1923.

Liechtenstein maintains direct diplomatic missions in Vienna, Bern, Berlin, Brussels, Strasbourg, and Washington, D.C., as well as Permanent Missions in New York and Geneva to the United Nations. Currently, diplomatic missions from 78 countries are accredited to Liechtenstein, but mostly reside in Bern. The Embassy in Brussels coordinates contacts with the European Union, Belgium, and also the Holy See.

For a long time, diplomatic relations with Germany were maintained through a non-resident ambassador; that is, a contact person who was not permanently resident in Germany. Since 2002, however, Liechtenstein has had a permanent ambassador in Berlin, while the German embassy in Switzerland is also responsible for the Principality. Liechtenstein's Ministry of Foreign Affairs considers the contacts to be extremely fruitful and important for the country's development, especially on the economic level.

Conflicts over the handling of banking and tax data have repeatedly strained relations with Germany. On 2 September 2009, Liechtenstein and Germany signed an agreement on cooperation and the exchange of information in tax matters. The text of the agreement followed the OECD model agreement and provides for an exchange of information on tax matters upon request as of the 2010 tax year. In addition, Liechtenstein regards Germany as an important partner in safeguarding its interests in European integration. At the cultural level, project sponsorship plays a particularly important role. For example, the Hilti Foundation financed the exhibition Egypt's Sunken Treasures in Berlin, and the state donated 20,000 euros following the fire at the Duchess Anna Amalia Library in Weimar.

Liechtenstein is a member of the Forum of Small States, a group founded in 1992 by Singapore currently containing 108 nations that have fewer than ten million inhabitants at the time of joining.

Liechtenstein is also a member of the International Monetary Fund since the annual meeting of World Bank Group in Washington, D.C. on 21 October 2024.

=== Security and defence ===
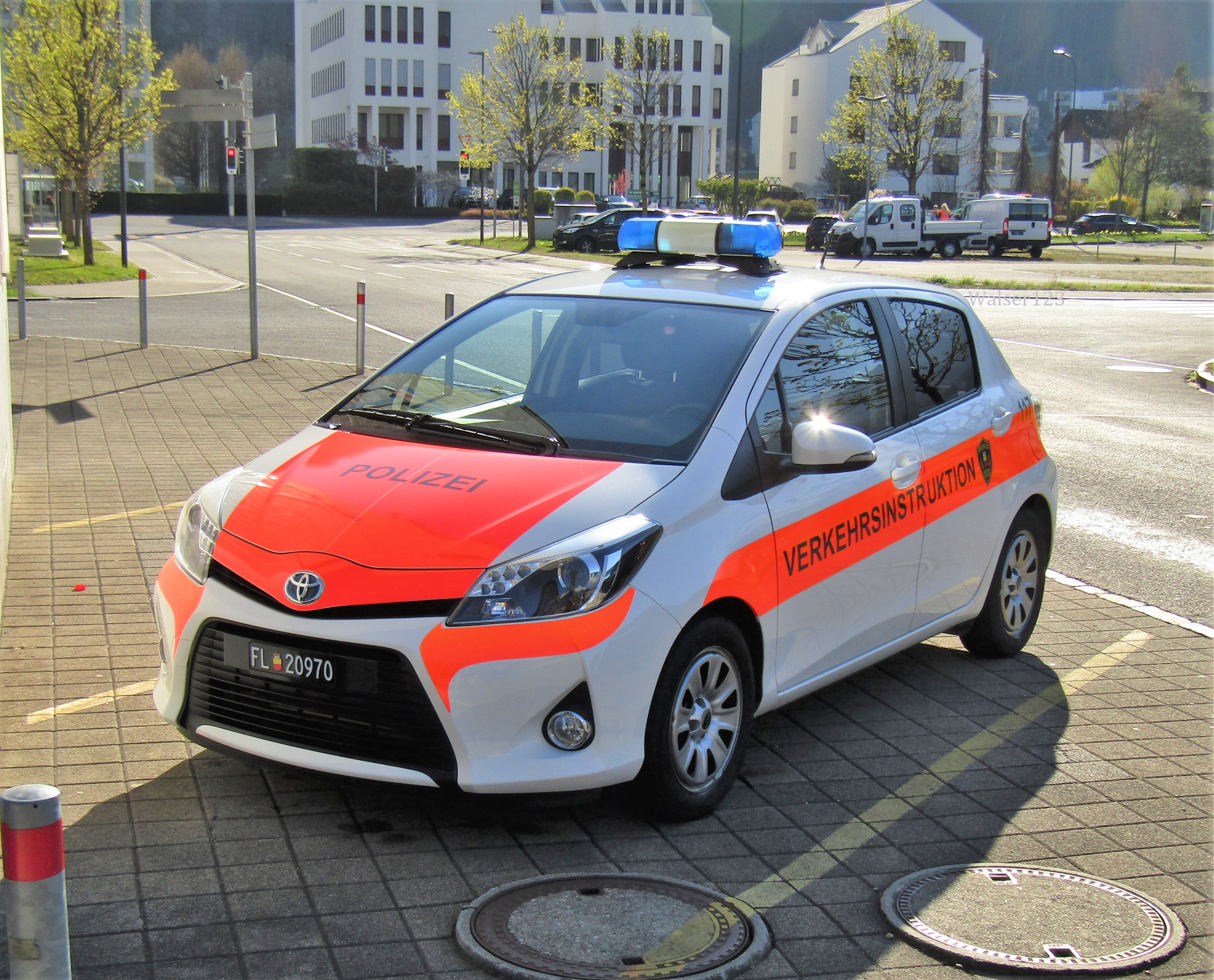
Liechtenstein Police

The Liechtenstein National Police force is responsible for keeping order within the country. It consists of 87 field officers and 38 civilian staff, totaling 125 employees. All officers are equipped with small arms. The country has one of the world's lowest crime rates. Liechtenstein's prison holds few, if any, inmates, and those with sentences over two years are transferred to Austrian jurisdiction. The Liechtenstein National Police maintains a trilateral treaty with Austria and Switzerland that enables close cross-border cooperation among the police forces of the three countries.

Liechtenstein follows a policy of neutrality and is one of the few countries in the world that maintain no military although its police force maintains a paramilitary force, the Princely Liechtenstein Security Corps, within the organisation that might act as its de facto army if an invasion of Liechtenstein ever occurred. The corps provides heavy backup for the National Police as well as Honour Guards at the Royal Palace and official functions. However, Liechtenstein can reinstate its military if deemed necessary.

The army was abolished for financial reasons soon after the Austro-Prussian War of 1866, in which Liechtenstein fielded an army of 80 men, although they were not involved in any fighting. No casualties were incurred. The unit numbered 81 upon return due to an Italian military liaison who accompanied the army back home. The demise of the German Confederation in that war freed Liechtenstein from its international obligation to maintain an army, and parliament seized this opportunity and refused to provide funding for one. The Prince objected, as such a move would leave the country defenceless, but relented on 12 February 1868, and disbanded the force. The last soldier to serve under the colours of Liechtenstein, Andreas Kieber, died in 1939 at age 94.

In 1985, the Swiss Army fired off shells during an exercise and mistakenly burned a patch of forest inside Liechtenstein. The incident was said to have been resolved "over a case of white wine". In March 2007, a 170-man Swiss infantry unit got lost during a training exercise and inadvertently crossed 1.5 kilometers (0.9 miles) into Liechtenstein. The accidental invasion ended when the unit realized their mistake and turned back. The Swiss Army later informed Liechtenstein of the incursion and offered official apologies, to which an interior ministry spokesperson responded, "No problem, these things happen."

On 20 September 2017, Liechtenstein signed the United Nations Treaty on the Prohibition of Nuclear Weapons.

=== Human rights ===
On 1 July 1984, Liechtenstein became the last country in Europe to grant women the right to vote, following three previous referendums which rejected it in 1968, 1971 and 1973. The referendum on women's suffrage that year, in which only men were allowed to participate, narrowly passed with 51.3% in favour.

In 2024, Liechtenstein passed legislation legalizing same-sex marriage, which entered into force in 2025. Abortion remains criminalised within Liechtenstein.

== Economy ==
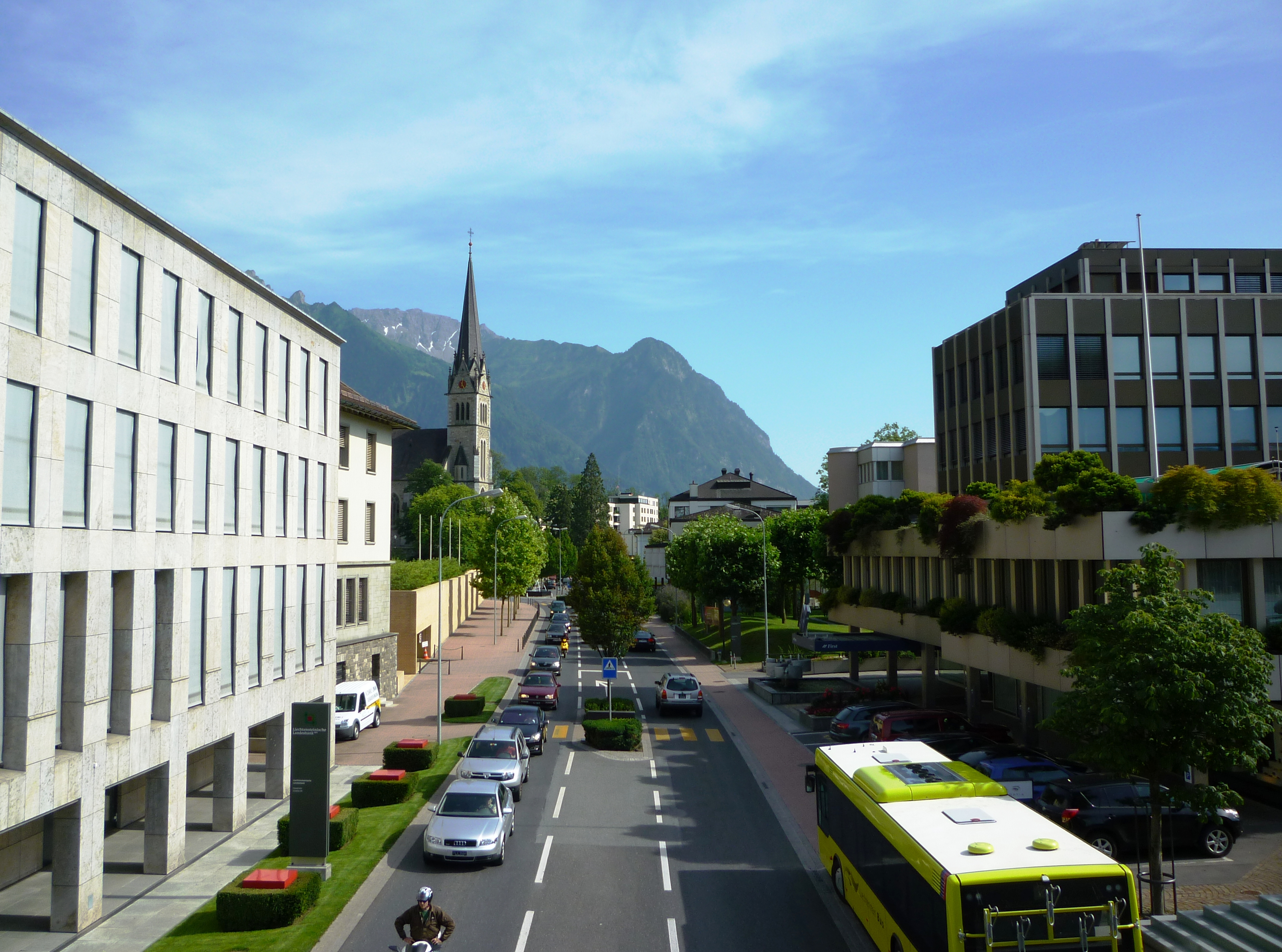
Looking southward at Vaduz city centre

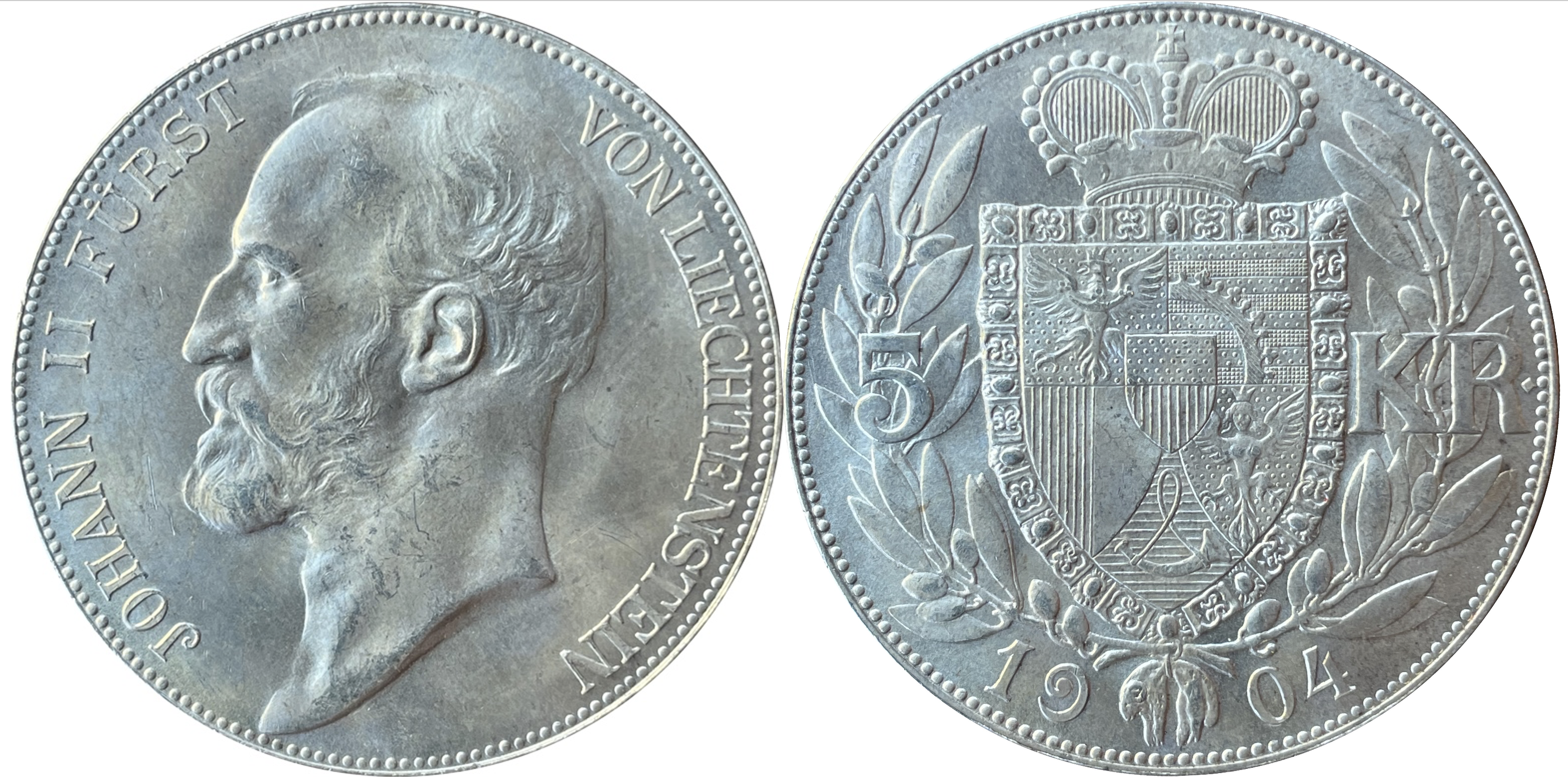
Silver coin: 5 kronen of Liechtenstein, 1904, the front of the coin is a portrait of Johann II

As of September 2019 the Prince of Liechtenstein is the world's seventh wealthiest monarch, with an estimated wealth of US$3.5 billion.

Despite its limited natural resources, Liechtenstein is one of the few countries in the world with more registered companies than citizens; it has developed a prosperous, highly industrialized free-enterprise economy and a financial service sector as well as a living standard that compares favourably with those of the urban areas of Liechtenstein's much larger European neighbours.

Liechtenstein participates in a customs union with Switzerland and employs the Swiss franc as the national currency. The country imports about 85% of its energy. Liechtenstein has been a member of the European Economic Area (an organization serving as a bridge between the European Free Trade Association (EFTA) and the European Union) since May 1995.

The government is working to harmonize its economic policies with those of an integrated Europe. In 2008, the unemployment rate was 1.5%. Liechtenstein has only one hospital, the Liechtensteinisches Landesspital in Vaduz. As of 2014 the CIA World Factbook estimated the gross domestic product (GDP) on a purchasing power parity basis to be $4.978 billion. As of 2021 the estimate per capita was $184,083.

Industries include electronics, textiles, precision instruments, metal manufacturing, power tools, anchor bolts, calculators, pharmaceuticals and food products. Its most recognizable international company and largest employer is Hilti, a manufacturer of direct fastening systems and other high-end power tools. Many cultivated fields and small farms are found both in the Oberland and Unterland. Liechtenstein produces wheat, barley, corn, potatoes, dairy products, livestock and wine.

Liechtenstein is one of the few countries in Europe (along with Monaco and San Marino) not to have a tax treaty with the United States, and efforts towards one seem to have stalled.

=== Taxation ===
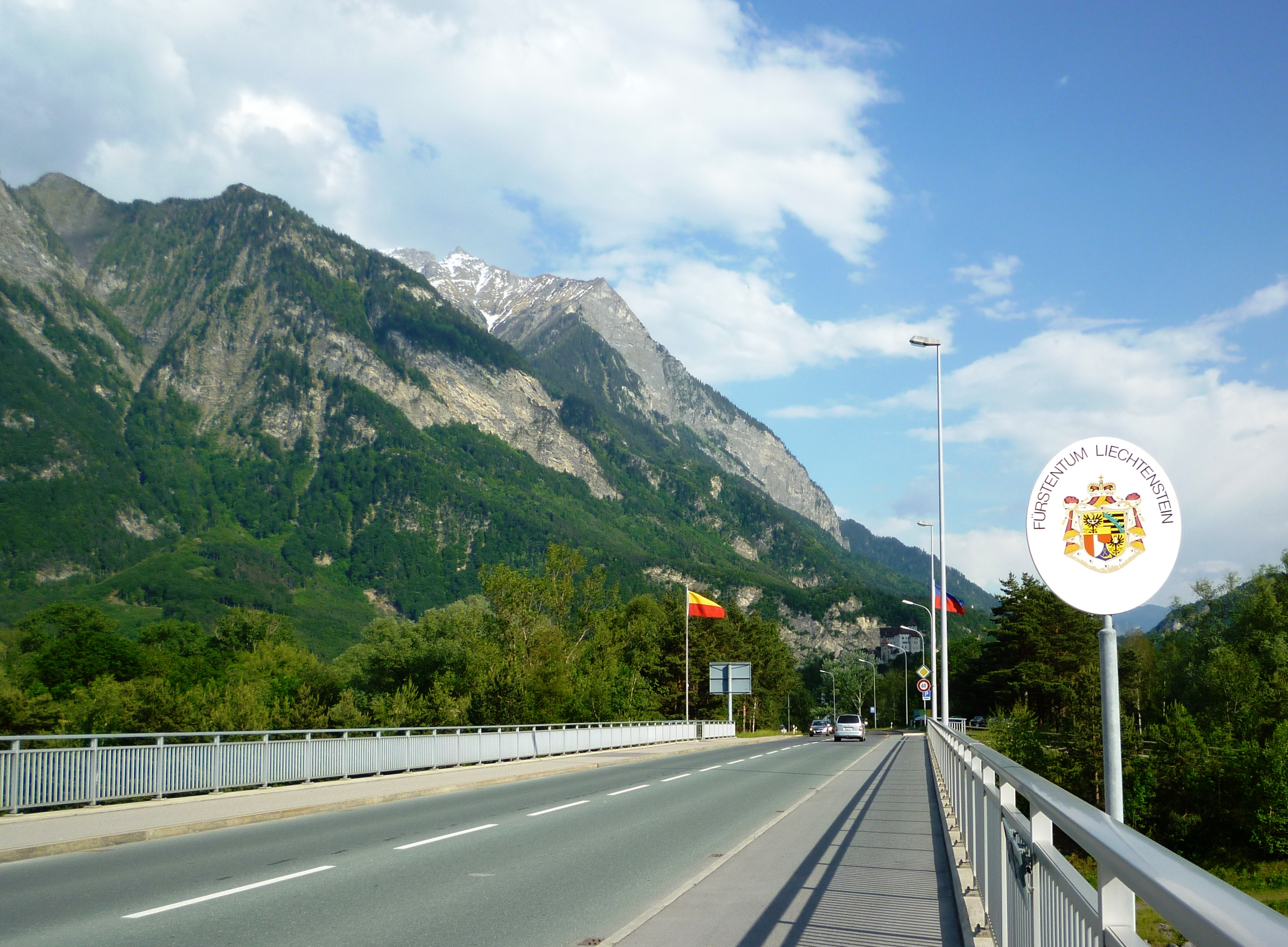
Since 1923, there has been no border control between Liechtenstein and Switzerland.

The government of Liechtenstein taxes personal income, business income and principal (wealth). The basic rate of personal income tax is between 1% and 8%.. There is no federal income tax on a single person earning less than 15,855 CHF. When combined with the additional income tax imposed by the communes, the combined income tax rate is 17.82%. An additional income tax of 4.3% is levied on all employees under the country's social security programme. This rate is higher for the self-employed, up to a maximum of 11%, making the maximum income tax rate about 29% in total. The basic tax rate on wealth is 0.06% per annum, and the combined total rate is 0.89%. The tax rate on corporate profits is 12.5%.

Liechtenstein mirrors the VAT tax laws of Switzerland. However, it does have its own VAT tax administration.

Liechtenstein's gift and estate taxes vary depending on the relationship the recipient has to the giver and the amount of the inheritance. The tax ranges between 0.5% and 0.75% for spouses and children and 18% to 27% for non-related recipients. The estate tax is progressive.

Liechtenstein has previously received significant revenues from Stiftungen ("foundations"), financial entities created to hide the true owner of nonresident foreigners' financial holdings. The foundation is registered in the name of a Liechtensteiner, often a lawyer. This set of laws used to make Liechtenstein a popular tax haven for extremely wealthy individuals and businesses attempting to avoid or evade taxes in their home countries.

In recent years, Liechtenstein has displayed stronger determination to prosecute international money launderers and worked to promote an image as a legitimate finance centre. In February 2008, the country's LGT Bank was implicated in a tax-fraud scandal in Germany, which strained the ruling family's relationship with the German government. Crown Prince Alois has accused the German government of trafficking in stolen goods, referring to its $7.3 million purchase of private banking information offered by a former employee of LGT Group. The United States Senate's subcommittee on tax haven banks said that the LGT bank, owned by the princely family, and on whose board they serve, "is a willing partner, and an aider and abettor to clients trying to evade taxes, dodge creditors or defy court orders".

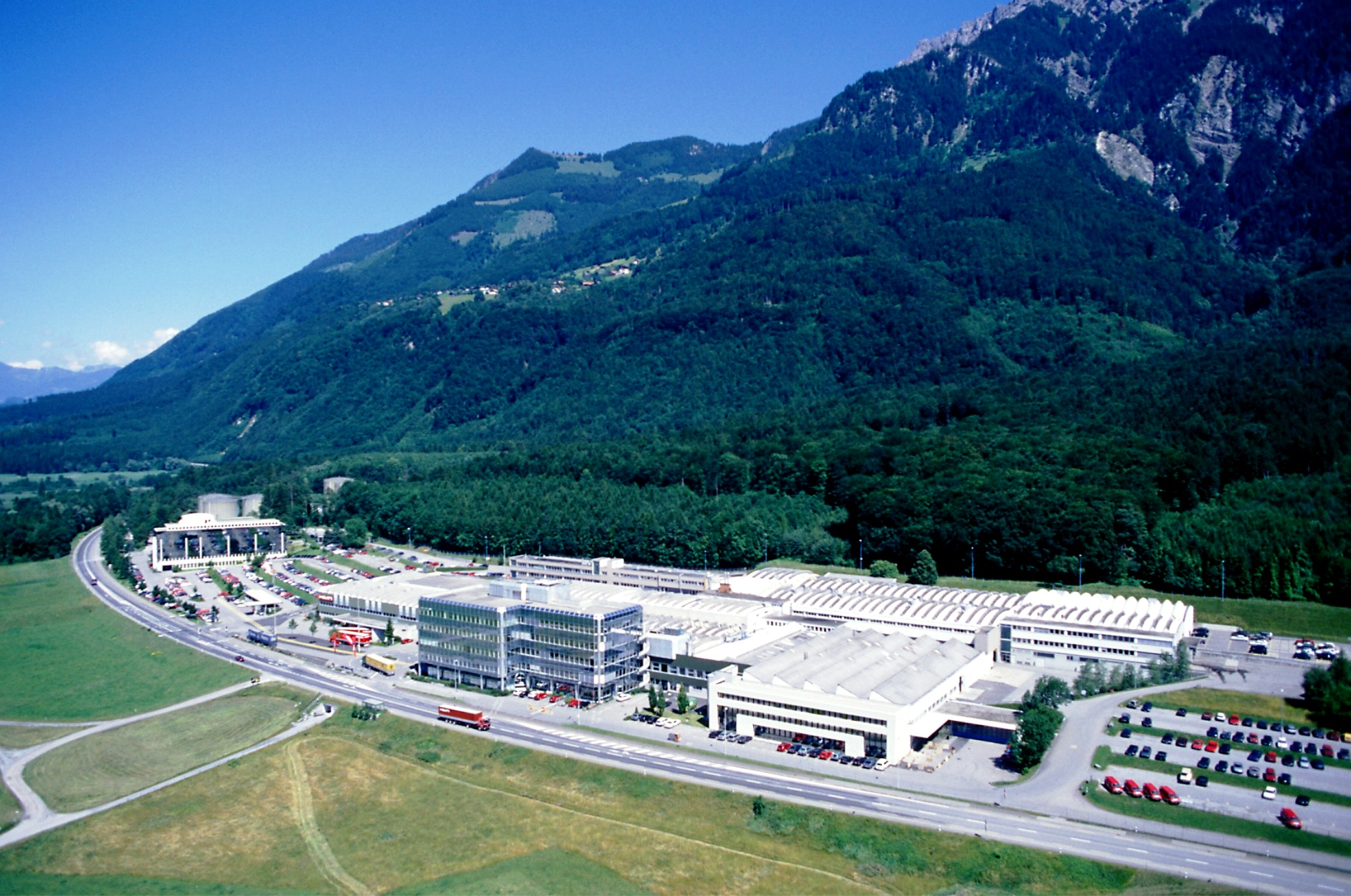
Headquarters of Hilti Corporation in Schaan, Liechtenstein

The 2008 Liechtenstein tax affair is a series of tax investigations in numerous countries whose governments suspect that some of their citizens have evaded tax obligations by using banks and trusts in Liechtenstein; the affair broke open with the biggest complex of investigations ever initiated for tax evasion in Germany. It was also seen as an attempt to put pressure on Liechtenstein, then one of the remaining uncooperative tax havens—along with Andorra and Monaco—as identified by the Paris-based Organisation for Economic Co-operation and Development in 2007. On 27 May 2009, the OECD removed Liechtenstein from the blacklist of uncooperative countries.

In August 2009, the British government department HM Revenue & Customs agreed with Liechtenstein to start exchanging information. It is believed that up to 5,000 British investors have roughly £3 billion deposited in accounts and trusts in the country.

In October 2015, the European Union and Liechtenstein signed a tax agreement to ensure the automatic exchange of financial information in case of tax disputes. The collection of data started in 2016. It is another step to bring the principality in line with other European countries regarding its taxation of private individuals and corporate assets.

=== Tourism ===
Tourist arrivals of 2024 in %

Tourism accounts for a large portion of Liechtenstein's economy. In 2023, Liechtenstein's accommodation establishments (hotels, vacation apartments, youth hostels, dormitories, and camping) recorded a total of 116,759 guest arrivals and 222,266 overnight stays.

=== Transport ===
==== Road ====
There are about 250 kilometres (155 mi) of paved roadway within Liechtenstein, with 90 km (56 mi) of marked bicycle paths.

Liechtenstein Bus is a subsidiary of the Swiss Postbus system, but separately run, and connects to the Swiss bus and train network at Buchs and Sargans, respectively. Holders of a Swiss Travel Pass (non-residents of Switzerland or Liechtenstein only) can travel for free on Liechtenstein's buses.

==== Rail ====
The single railway line in Liechtenstein is the Feldkirch–Buchs railway, of which 9.5 km (6 mi) are located within the principality. This line connects Feldkirch in Vorarlberg (Austria) with Buchs in the canton of St. Gallen (Switzerland). There are four railway stations in Liechtenstein, namely Schaan-Vaduz, Forst Hilti, Nendeln and Schaanwald (from west to east). With the exception of Schaanwald, which was closed in 2013, these stations are served by a regional train, the S2 of Vorarlberg S-Bahn, which runs between Feldkirch and Buchs SG on working days only. The service is operated by Austrian Federal Railways (ÖBB). Plans to upgrade the line and increase rail traffic were halted by a referendum in 2020.

Liechtenstein is nominally within the Ostwind Tariff Network, which also includes northeastern Switzerland. Railjet and EuroCity long-distance trains do not call at stations in Liechtenstein.

==== Air ====
Liechtenstein is one of only a few countries without an airport. The nearest large airport is Zurich Airport near Zürich, Switzerland (130 km or 80 miles by road). The nearest small airport is St. Gallen Airport (50 km or 30 miles). Friedrichshafen Airport also provides access to Liechtenstein, as it is 85 km (53 miles) away. Balzers Heliport is available for chartered helicopter flights.

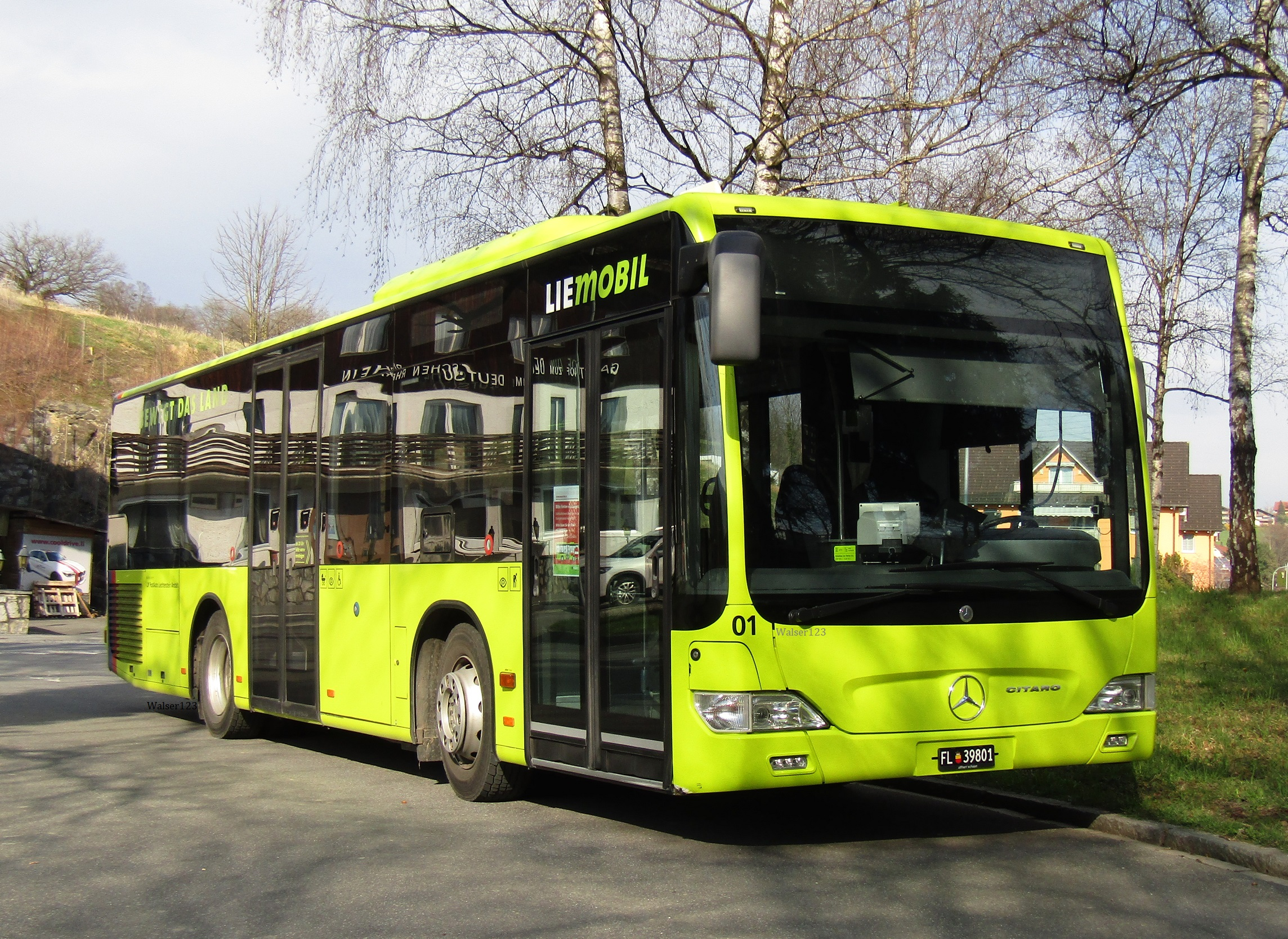
Liechtenstein Bus

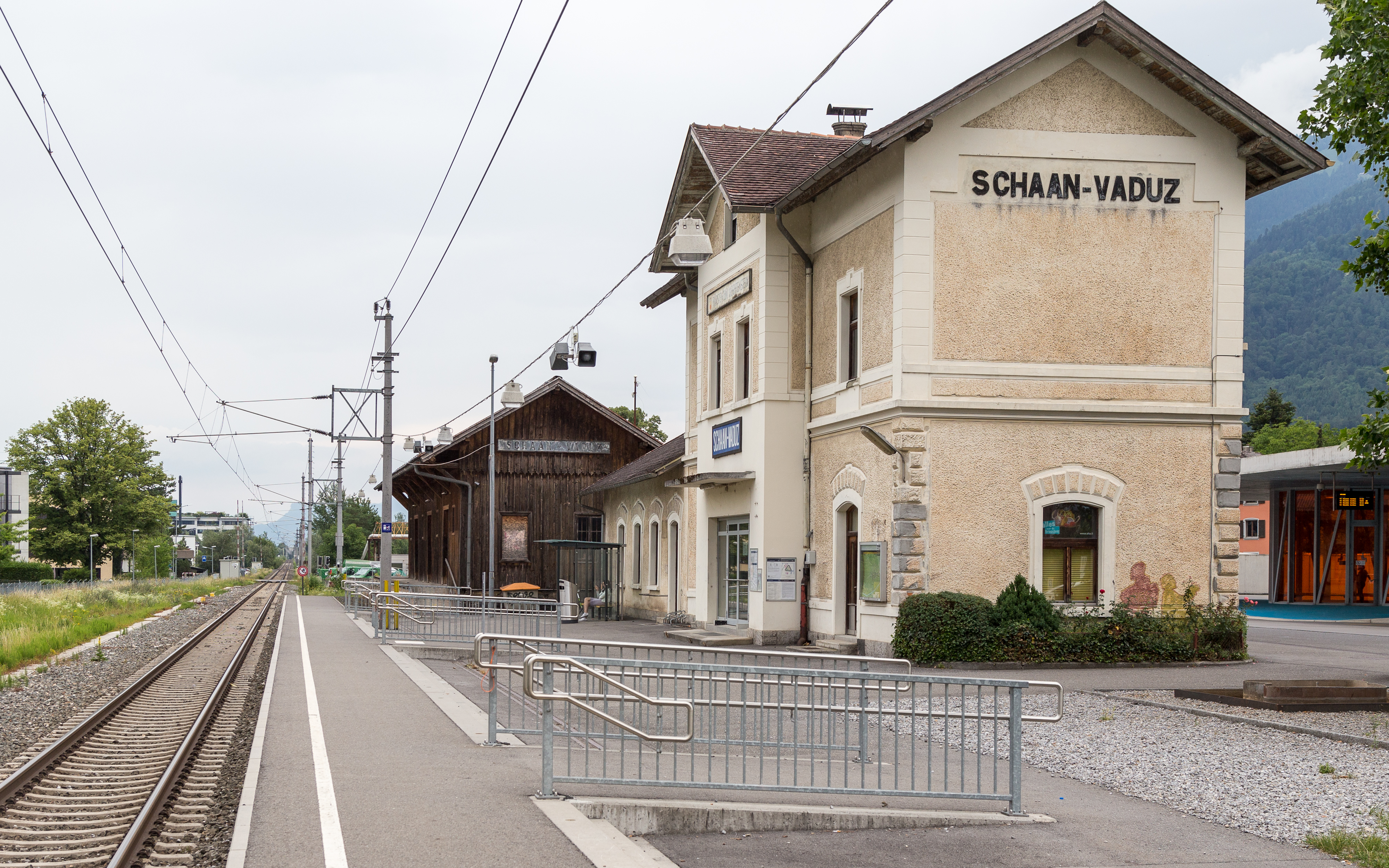
Schaan-Vaduz railway station

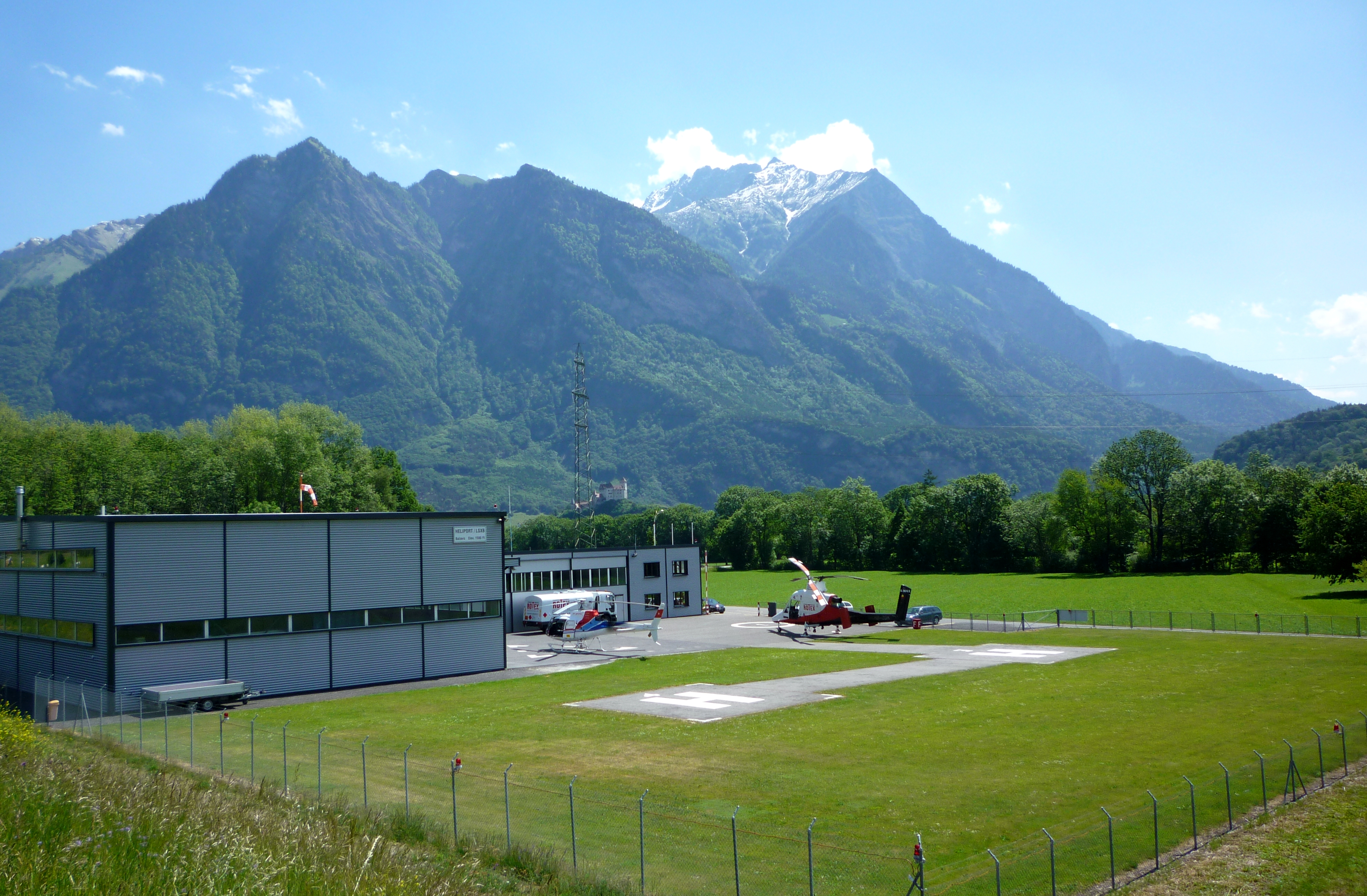
Balzers Heliport

== Demographics ==
With a population of 40,542 as of August 2026, Liechtenstein is Europe's fourth-smallest country after Vatican City, San Marino and Monaco. It is ranked #214 in world population. Its population is primarily Alemannic-speaking, although one third is foreign-born, primarily German speakers from Germany, Austria, and Switzerland, along with other Swiss, Italians, and Turks. Foreign-born people make up two-thirds of the country's workforce.

Liechtensteiners have an average life expectancy at birth of 82.0 years, subdividing as male: 79.8 years, female: 84.8 years (2018 est.). The infant mortality rate is 4.2 per 1,000 live births, according to 2018 estimates.The median age of citizens is 44.7 years.

=== Languages ===
The official language is German, spoken by 92% of the population as their main language in 2020. 73% of Liechtenstein's population speak an Alemannic dialect of German at home that is highly divergent from Standard German but closely related to dialects spoken in neighbouring regions such as Switzerland and Vorarlberg, Austria. In Triesenberg, a Walser German dialect promoted by the municipality is spoken. Swiss Standard German is also understood and spoken by most Liechtensteiners.

=== Religion ===
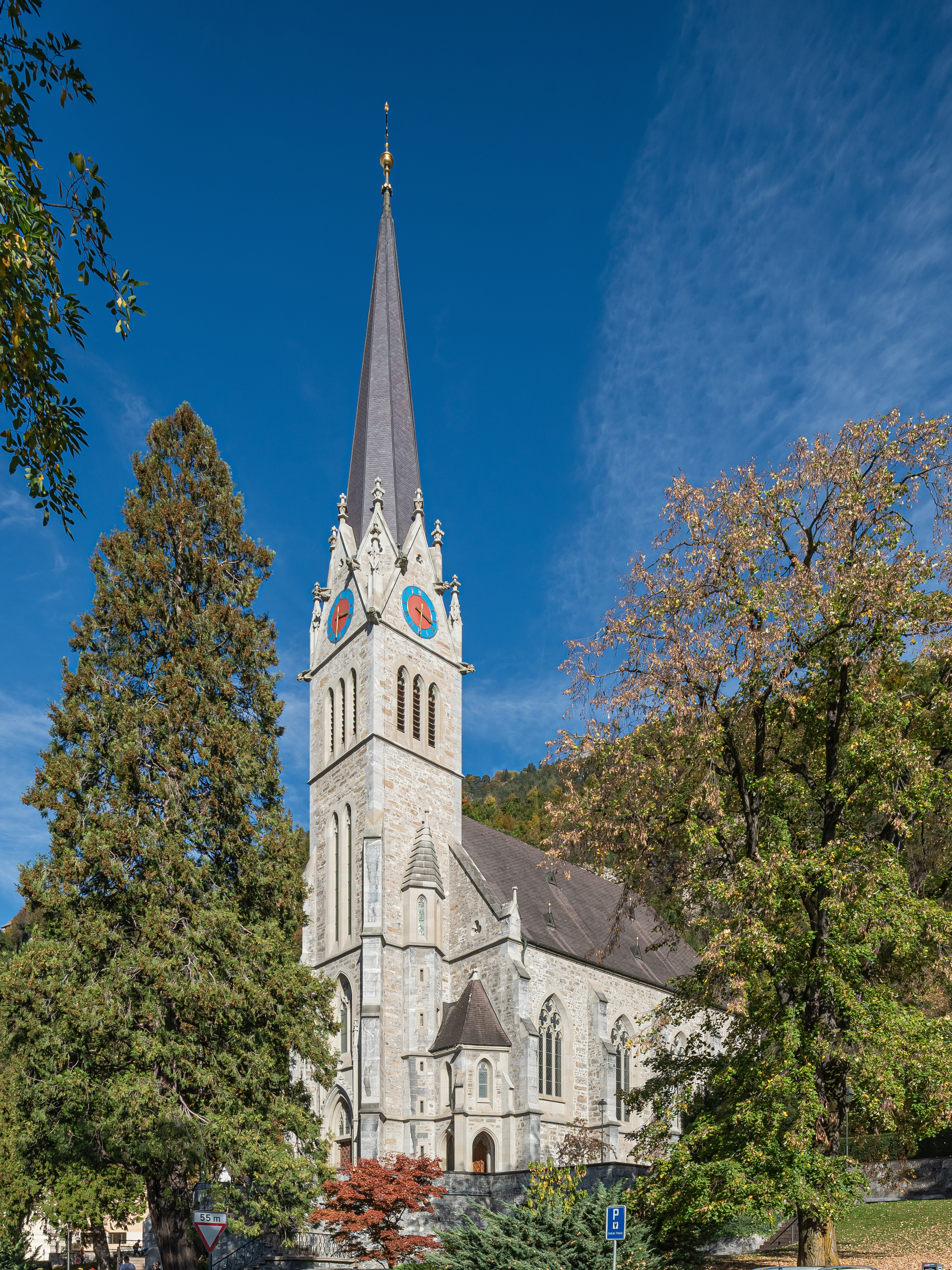
St. Florin Catholic Cathedral in Vaduz

According to the Constitution of Liechtenstein, Catholicism is its official state religion:

The Catholic Church is the State Church and as such shall enjoy the full protection of the State

— Constitution of Liechtenstein

Liechtenstein offers protection to adherents of all religions, and considers the "religious interests of the people" a priority of the government. In Liechtenstein's schools, although exceptions are allowed, religious education in Catholicism or Protestantism (either Lutheran or Calvinist, or both) is legally required. Tax exemption is granted by the government to religious organizations. According to the Pew Research Center, social conflict caused by religious hostilities is low in Liechtenstein, and so is government restriction on the practice of religion.

According to the 2010 census, 85.8% of the total population were Christian, of whom 75.9% adhered to the Catholic faith, constituted in the Catholic Archdiocese of Vaduz, while 9.6% were either Protestant, mainly organized in the Evangelical Church in Liechtenstein (a United church, Lutheran & Reformed), the Evangelical Lutheran Church in Liechtenstein and the Free Evangelical Church Schaan (non-denominational), or Eastern Orthodox, mainly organized in the Christian-Orthodox Church. There is a small community of 30 Jewish people who attend a synagogue in Switzerland. The largest minority religion is Islam (5.4% of the total population).

=== Education ===
Liechtensteinisches Gymnasium

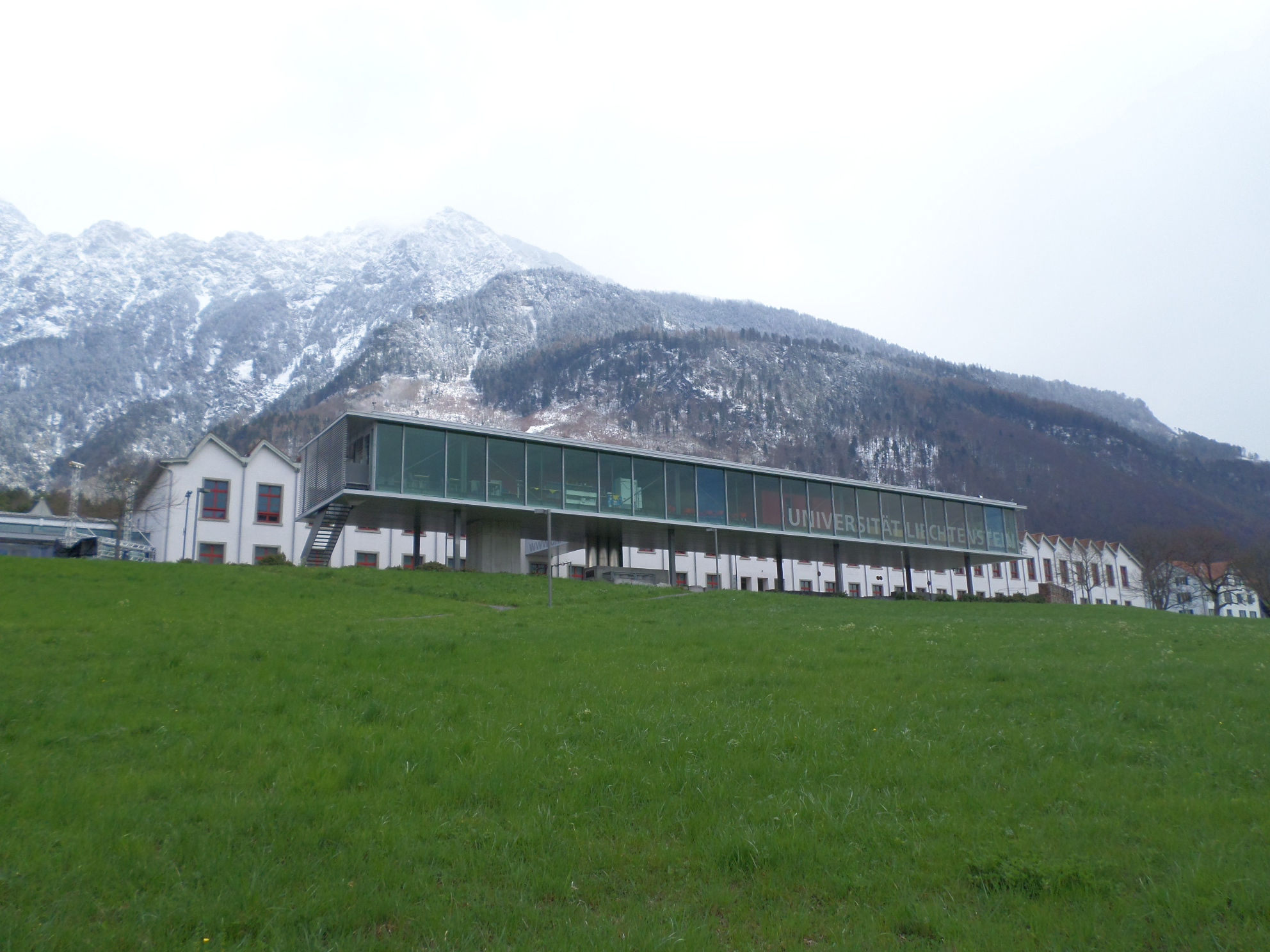
University of Liechtenstein

The literacy rate of Liechtenstein is 100%. In a 2006 Programme for International Student Assessment report, coordinated by the Organisation for Economic Co-operation and Development, ranked Liechtenstein's education as the 10th-best in the world. In 2012, Liechtenstein had the highest PISA scores of any European country.

Within Liechtenstein, there are four main centres for higher education:

- University of Liechtenstein
- Private University in the Principality of Liechtenstein
- Liechtenstein Institute
- International Academy of Philosophy, Liechtenstein

There are nine public high schools in the country. These include:

- Liechtensteinisches Gymnasium in Vaduz.
- Realschule Vaduz and Oberschule Vaduz, in the Schulzentrum Mühleholz II in Vaduz
- Realschule Schaan and Sportschule Liechtenstein in Schaan

== Culture ==
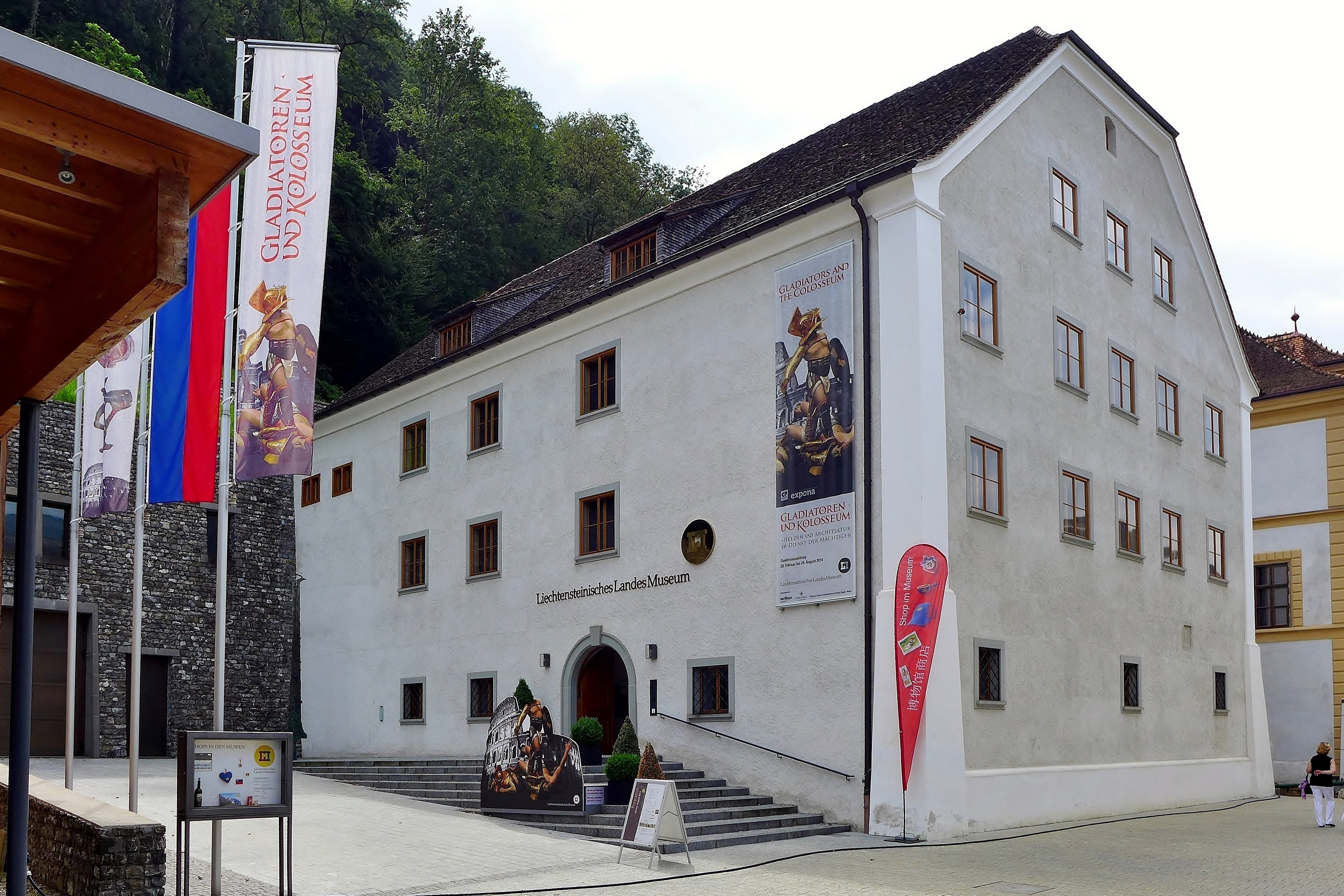
Liechtenstein National Museum

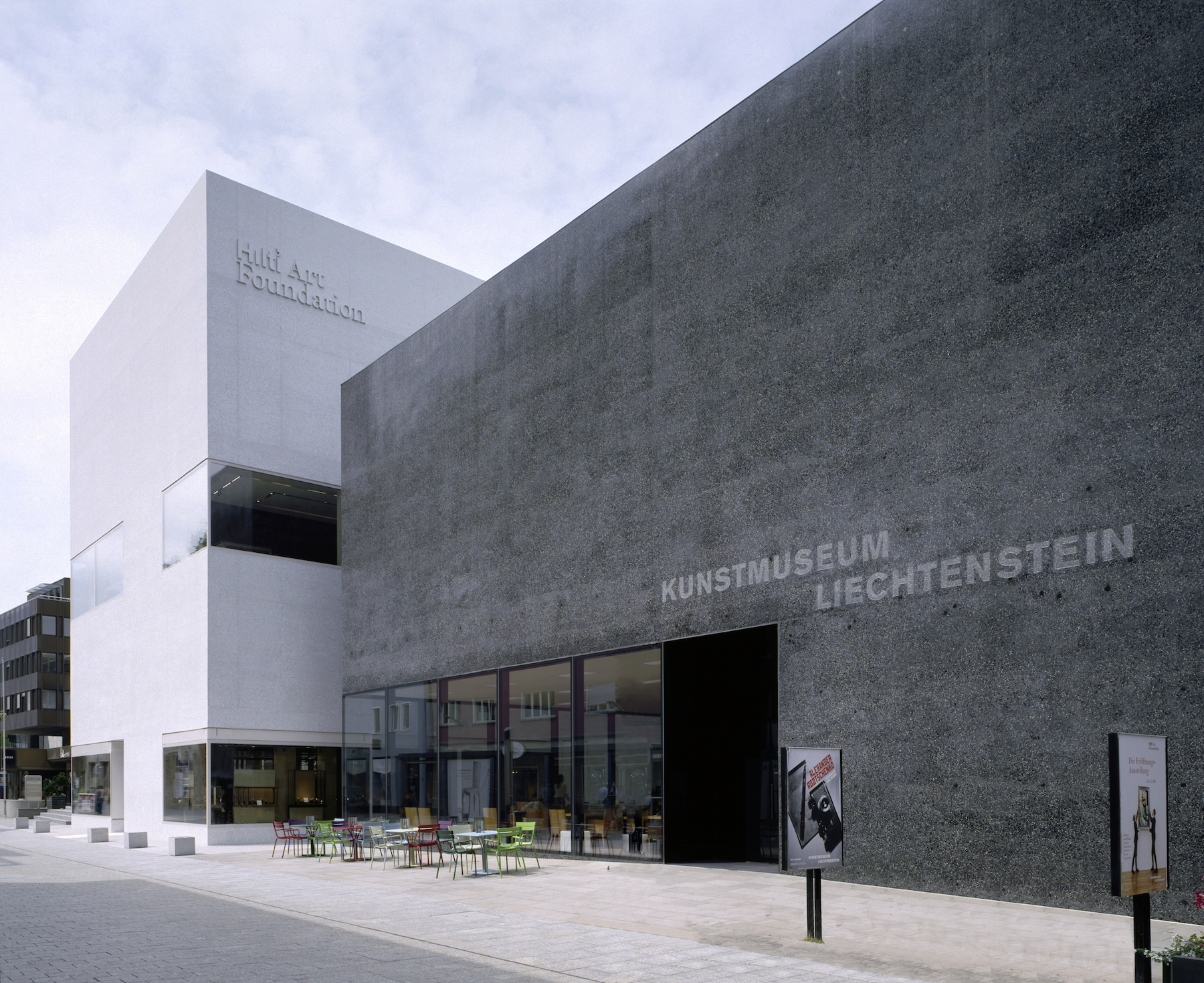
Kunstmuseum, Liechtenstein Art Museum

As a result of its small size, Liechtenstein has been strongly affected by external cultural influences, most notably those originating in the southern regions of German-speaking Europe, including Austria, Baden-Württemberg, Bavaria, Switzerland, and specifically Tirol and Vorarlberg.

A notable museum is the Kunstmuseum Liechtenstein, an international museum of modern and contemporary art with an international art collection. The building by the Swiss architects Morger, Degelo, and Kerez is a landmark in Vaduz. It was completed in November 2000 and forms a "black box" of tinted concrete and black basalt stone. The museum collection is also the national art collection of Liechtenstein.

The Historical Society of the Principality of Liechtenstein and the Liechtenstein National Museum (Liechtensteinisches Landesmuseum) also play a role in preserving the culture and history of the country. The National Museum shows permanent exhibitions on the cultural and natural history of Liechtenstein as well as special exhibitions. There is also a stamp museum, ski museum, and a 500-year-old Rural Lifestyle Museum.

The Liechtenstein State Library is the library that has legal deposit for all books published in the country. Poet Ida Ospelt-Amann published her works exclusively in the Alemannic dialect of Vaduz.

Historical sites include Vaduz Castle, Gutenberg Castle and Vaduz Cathedral.

The Private Art Collection of the Prince of Liechtenstein, one of the world's leading private art collections, is shown at the Liechtenstein Museum in Vienna.

On the country's national holiday, all subjects are invited to the castle of the head of state. A significant portion of the population attends the national celebration at the castle where speeches are made and complimentary beer is served.

Music and theatre are important parts of the culture. There are numerous music organizations such as the Liechtenstein Musical Company, the annual Guitar Days, and the International Josef Gabriel Rheinberger Society, which play in two main theatres.

=== Media ===
The primary internet service provider and mobile network operator of Liechtenstein is Telecom Liechtenstein, located in Vaduz.

There are two conventional television channels in the country. The private channel 1FLTV was created in 2008 with a goal of joining the European Broadcasting Union, which it did not accomplish and has since abandoned. The Landeskanal (de) ("National Channel") is operated by the government's Unit for Information and Communication and carries government proceedings, public affairs programming, and cultural events. Both are seen on local cable providers, along with all major channels from the other German-speaking countries. Since Switzerland shut off its digital terrestrial television network in 2019, the only free television signals available are German and Austrian channels from the Sender Pfänder (de) in Bregenz.

Radio Liechtenstein, which was established in 2004 along with the public-service broadcaster Liechtensteinischer Rundfunk (LRF) that operated it, was the country's only domestic radio station based in Schaan. Radio Liechtenstein ceased operations in 2025 after a referendum passed requiring the government to privatize it, but no agreement could be reached before the deadline. The three FM programs of the Swiss SRF are still broadcast from the Sender Erbi (de) overlooking Vaduz. Liechtenstein also has one major newspaper: Liechtensteiner Vaterland.

Amateur radio is a hobby of some nationals and visitors. However, unlike virtually every other sovereign nation, Liechtenstein does not have its own ITU prefix. Conventionally, amateurs are issued call signs with the Swiss prefix "HB", followed by "0" or "L".

=== Sports ===
Liechtenstein football teams play in the Swiss football leagues. The Liechtenstein Football Cup allows access for one Liechtenstein team each year to the UEFA Europa Conference League; FC Vaduz, a team playing in the Swiss Challenge League, the second division in Swiss football, is the most successful team in the Cup, and scored their greatest success in the European Cup Winners' Cup in 1996 when they drew with and defeated the Latvian team FC Universitate Riga by 1–1 and 4–2, to go on to a lucrative (where match revenues are split equally) fixture against Paris Saint-Germain F.C., which they lost 0–3 and 0–4.

The Liechtenstein men's national football team and Liechtenstein women's national football team are consistently ranked low amongst FIFA's official rankings, often meaning the team struggles against tough European competitors; this was the basis for a book about Liechtenstein's unsuccessful qualifying campaign for the 2002 World Cup by British author Charlie Connelly. In one week during autumn 2004, however, the team managed a 2–2 draw with Portugal, who only a few months earlier had been the losing finalists in the European Championships. Four days later, the Liechtenstein team travelled to Luxembourg, where they defeated the home team 4–0 in a 2006 World Cup qualifying match.

In the qualification stage of the European Championship 2008, Liechtenstein defeated Latvia 1–0, which prompted the Latvian coach's resignation. They went on to defeat Iceland 3–0 on 17 October 2007, which is considered one of the most dramatic losses of the Icelandic national football team. On 7 September 2010, Liechtenstein came within seconds of a 1–1 draw against Scotland in Glasgow, having led 1–0 earlier in the second half, but Liechtenstein lost 2–1 after a goal by Stephen McManus in the 97th minute. On 3 June 2011, Liechtenstein defeated Lithuania 2–0.

Liechtenstein competes in the Switzerland U16 Cup Tournament, which offers young players an opportunity to play against top football clubs.

As an alpine country, the main sporting opportunity for Liechtensteiners to excel is in winter sports such as downhill skiing: the country's single ski area is Malbun. Hanni Wenzel won two gold medals and one silver medal in the 1980 Winter Olympics (she won bronze in 1976), her brother Andreas won one silver medal in 1980 and one bronze medal in 1984 in the giant slalom event, and her daughter Tina Weirather won a bronze medal in 2018 in the Super-G. With ten medals overall (all in alpine skiing), Liechtenstein has won more Olympic medals per capita than any other nation. It is the smallest country to win a medal in any Olympics, Winter or Summer, and currently the only country to win a medal in the Winter Games but not in the Summer Games. Other notable skiers from Liechtenstein are Marco Büchel, Willi Frommelt, Paul Frommelt and Ursula Konzett.

Another discipline unusually popular with Liechtensteiners is motorsport; American-born German-Colombian Rikky von Opel raced under the flag of Liechtenstein in Formula One in 1973 and 1974, and Manfred Schurti competed in 9 editions of the 24 Hours of Le Mans as a Porsche factory driver with a best finish of 4th overall in 1976. The country is currently represented internationally by Fabienne Wohlwend and Matthias Kaiser in endurance racing.

Other sports Liechtenstein athletes have had success in include tennis, with Stephanie Vogt and Kathinka von Deichmann both having varying degrees of success on the women's tour, as well as swimming; both Julia Hassler and Christoph Meier represented the country at the 2016 Summer Olympics with the former the nations' flag bearer.

In March 2020, the distance world record for electric motorcycles was set in Liechtenstein. Artist Michel von Tell drove over 1,000 miles within 24 hours on the first electric Harley-Davidson. The record is still current in 2023 and ended in Ruggell.

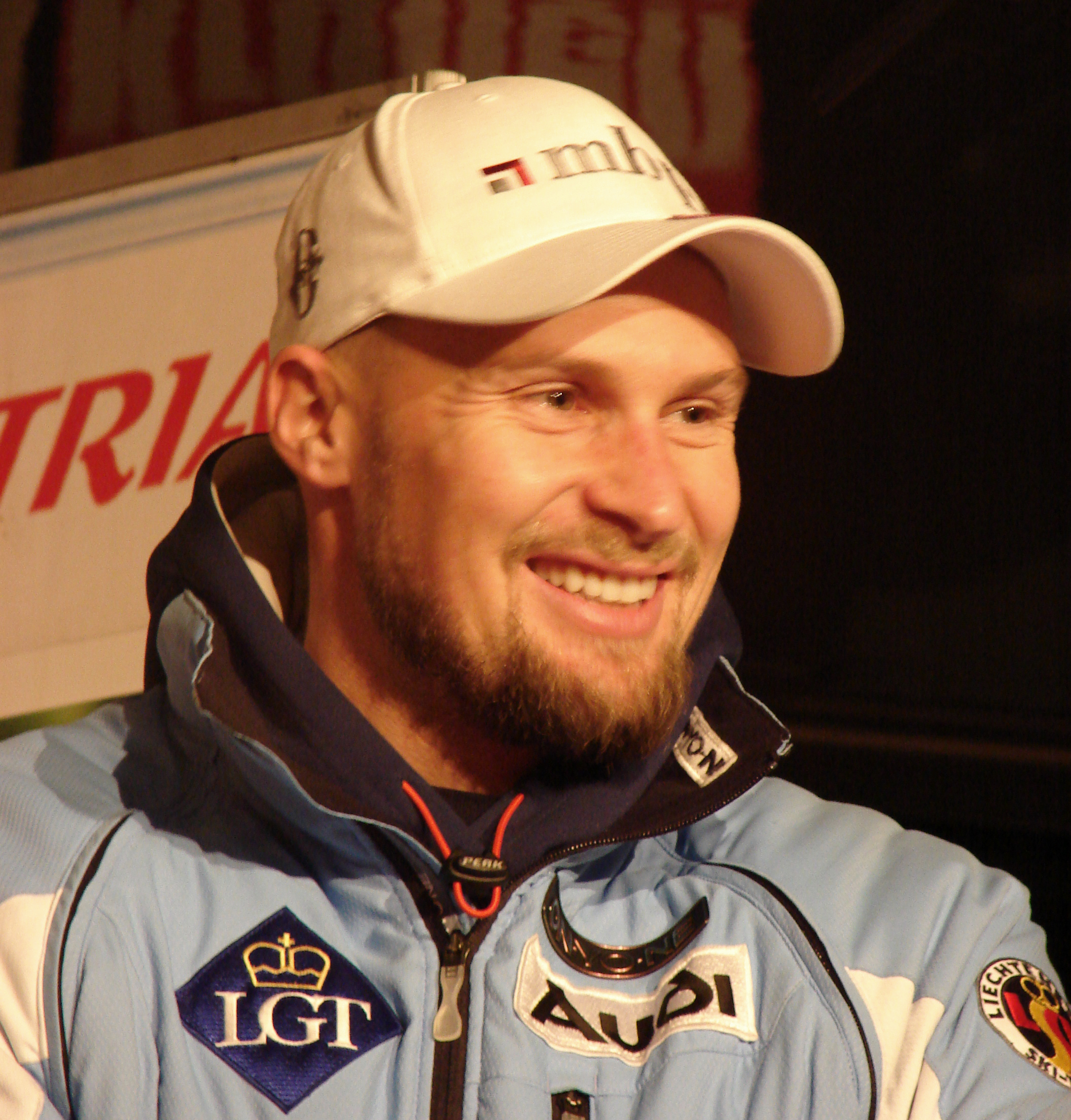
Marco Büchel, the first Liechtensteiner alpine skier to compete at six Winter Olympics

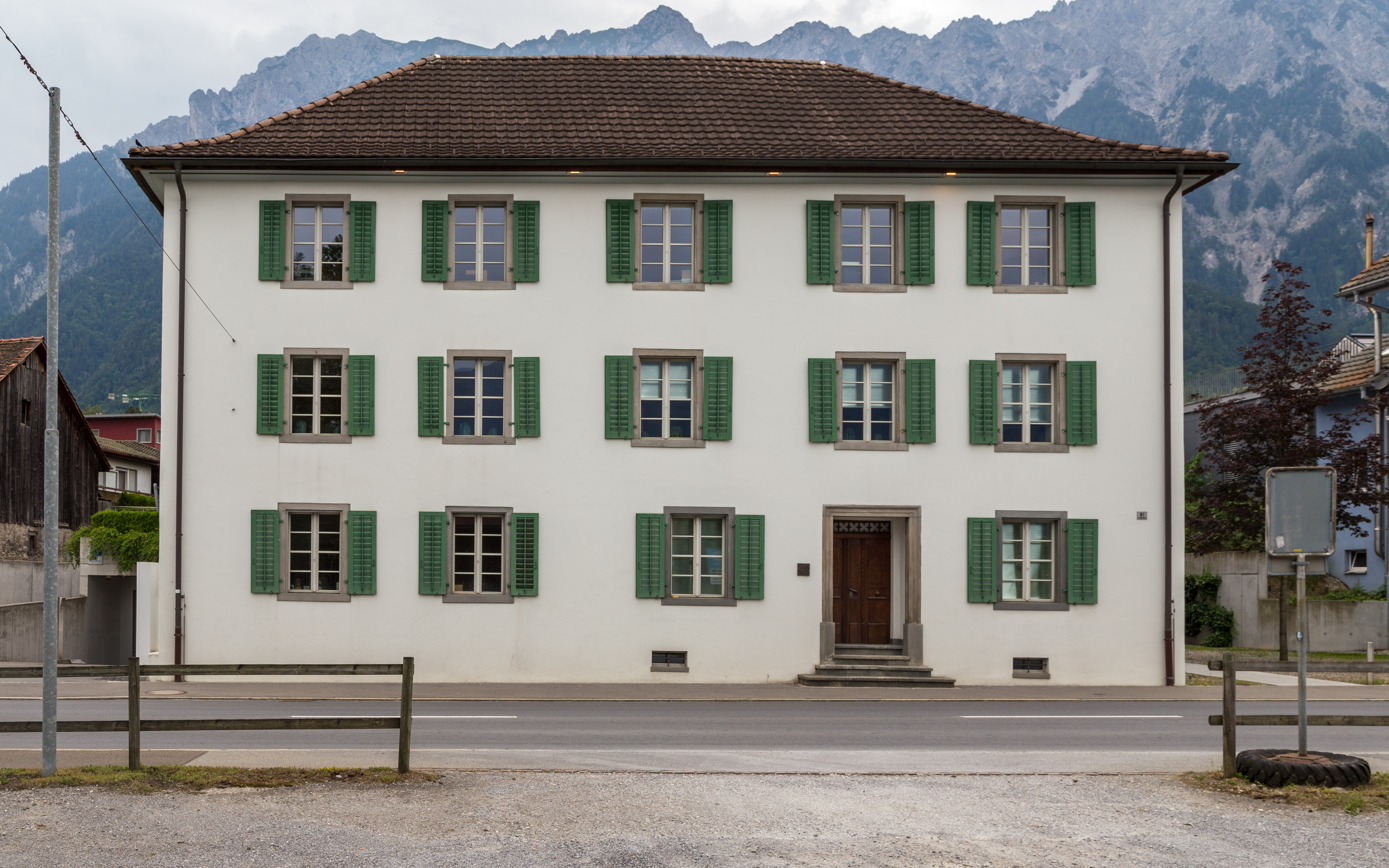
Liechtenstein Olympic Committee in Schaan

== See also ==
- List of Liechtensteiners
- Outline of Liechtenstein
