= List of flag bearers for Liechtenstein at the Olympics =

Liechtenstein at the Olympics
- IOC code: LIE
- NOC: Liechtenstein Olympic Committee
- Website: www.olympic.li (in German and English)
- Medals: Gold 2 Silver 2 Bronze 6 Total 10

Summer appearances
- 1936; 1948; 1952; 1956; 1960; 1964; 1968; 1972; 1976; 1980; 1984; 1988; 1992; 1996; 2000; 2004; 2008; 2012; 2016; 2020; 2024

Winter appearances
- 1936; 1948; 1952; 1956; 1960; 1964; 1968; 1972; 1976; 1980; 1984; 1988; 1992; 1994; 1998; 2002; 2006; 2010; 2014; 2018; 2022; 2026

This is a list of flag bearers who have represented Liechtenstein at the Olympics.

Flag bearers carry the national flag of their country at the opening ceremony of the Olympic Games.

== 1936 flag incident ==
Liechtenstein competed at the Summer Olympic Games for the first time at the 1936 Summer Olympics in Berlin, Germany. The flag bearer was sprinter and discus thrower Oskar Ospelt. It was only at these games that Liechtenstein realized their flag was identical to that of Haiti, prompting Liechtenstein in 1937 to add the crown found in their current flag. This modified design was adopted on June 24, 1937.

== Flag bearers ==
#	Event year	Season	Flag bearer	Sport
1	1936	Summer	Oskar Ospelt	Athletics
2	1948	Winter	Christof Frommelt	Cross-country skiing
3	1956	Winter	Eduard Theodor von Falz-Fein	Bobsleigh (did not compete)
4	1960	Summer	Alois Büchel	Athletics
5	1964	Summer	Alois Büchel	Athletics
6	1972	Winter	Eduard Theodor von Falz-Fein	Bobsleigh (did not compete)
7	1976	Winter	Ursula Konzett	Alpine skiing
8	1980	Winter	Petra Wenzel	Alpine skiing
9	1984	Winter	Günther Marxer	Alpine skiing
10	1984	Summer	Manuela Marxer	Athletics
11	1988	Winter	Andi Wenzel	Alpine skiing
12	1988	Summer	Yvonne Elkuch	Cycling
13	1992	Winter	Birgit Heeb-Batliner	Alpine skiing
14	1992	Summer	Manuela Marxer	Athletics
15	1994	Winter	Markus Hasler	Cross-country skiing
16	1996	Summer	Birgit Blum	Judo
17	1998	Winter	Tamara Schädler	Alpine skiing
18	2000	Summer	Oliver Geissmann	Shooting
19	2002	Winter	Marco Büchel	Alpine skiing
20	2004	Summer	Oliver Geissmann	Shooting
21	2006	Winter	Jessica Walter	Alpine skiing
22	2008	Summer	Marcel Tschopp	Athletics
23	2010	Winter	Richard Wunder	Bobsleigh
24	2012	Summer	Stephanie Vogt	Tennis
25	2014	Winter	Tina Weirather	Alpine skiing
26	2016	Summer	Julia Hassler	Swimming
27	2018	Winter	Marco Pfiffner	Alpine skiing
28	2020	Summer	Julia Hassler	Swimming
28	2020	Summer	Raphael Schwendinger	Judo
29	2022	Winter	Stefan Marxer	LOC president
30	2024	Summer	Romano Püntener	Mountain biking

== See also ==
- Liechtenstein at the Olympics
