= List of Olympic medalists for Liechtenstein =

Liechtenstein at the Olympics
- IOC code: LIE
- NOC: Liechtenstein Olympic Committee
- Website: www.olympic.li (in German and English)
- Medals Ranked 95th: Gold 2 Silver 2 Bronze 6 Total 10

Summer appearances
- 1936; 1948; 1952; 1956; 1960; 1964; 1968; 1972; 1976; 1980; 1984; 1988; 1992; 1996; 2000; 2004; 2008; 2012; 2016; 2020; 2024; 2028

Winter appearances
- 1936; 1948; 1952; 1956; 1960; 1964; 1968; 1972; 1976; 1980; 1984; 1988; 1992; 1994; 1998; 2002; 2006; 2010; 2014; 2018; 2022; 2026

Liechtenstein debuted at the Olympics in 1936 and has fielded a team at every Olympics since, except for the 1952 Winter Olympics and the 1956 and 1980 Summer Olympics. Liechtenstein won its first medal at the 1976 Winter Olympics, when alpine skier Hanni Wenzel won a bronze in the women's slalom. Wenzel also won the delegation's first gold medal upon winning the women's giant slalom at the following Winter Games.

Overall, Liechtenstein has won two gold medals, two silver medals, and six bronze medals. Liechtenstein has also won a bronze medal at the Winter Youth Olympics. The delegation holds the distinction of being the only one to have earned all of its medals at the Winter Olympics while never winning a medal at the Summer Olympics. Liechtenstein is also the least populated nation to have won an Olympic gold medal.

== History ==
Liechtenstein debuted at the Olympics at the 1936 Winter Olympics with four athletes across two sports but did not medal. Since then, Liechtenstein has taken part in every Olympics except the 1952 Winter Olympics due to financial constraints and the 1956 Summer Olympics and 1980 Summer Olympics due to boycotts stemming from the Hungarian Revolution of 1956 and Soviet invasion of Afghanistan, respectively.

The delegation won its first medals at the 1976 Winter Olympics when alpine skiers Hanni Wenzel and Willi Frommelt won bronze in the women's slalom and men's slalom, respectively. At the 1980 Winter Olympics, the delegation had its biggest medal haul with two gold medals and two silver medals. Wenzel earned two gold medals and one silver medal across the women's giant slalom, women's slalom, and women's downhill, while her brother Andreas Wenzel won a silver in the men's giant slalom. He won a bronze medal in the same event at the 1984 Winter Olympics, while Ursula Konzett won a bronze in the women's slalom.

Willi Frommelt's brother, Paul Frommelt, won the delegation's next Olympic medal at the 1988 Winter Olympics with a bronze in the men's slalom. Thirty years after their last medal, the daughter of Hanni Wenzel, Tina Weirather, won a bronze medal in the women's super-G at the 2018 Winter Olympics. As of the conclusion of the 2024 Summer Olympics, Liechtenstein has won all of its Olympic medals at the Winter Olympics, being the only delegation to do so.

== Medalists ==
A total of six athletes have won two gold medals, two silver medals, and six bronze medals.

Medals won at the Winter Olympics
Name(s)	Medal	Sport	Event	Year	Location
Hanni Wenzel	Bronze	Alpine skiing	Women's slalom	1976	Innsbruck, Austria
Willi Frommelt	Bronze	Alpine skiing	Men's slalom	1976	Innsbruck, Austria
Hanni Wenzel	Gold	Alpine skiing	Women's giant slalom	1980	Lake Placid, United States
Hanni Wenzel	Gold	Alpine skiing	Women's slalom	1980	Lake Placid, United States
Hanni Wenzel	Silver	Alpine skiing	Women's downhill	1980	Lake Placid, United States
Andreas Wenzel	Silver	Alpine skiing	Men's giant slalom	1980	Lake Placid, United States
Andreas Wenzel	Bronze	Alpine skiing	Men's giant slalom	1984	(Socialist Federal Republic of Yugoslavia) Sarajevo, Yugoslavia
Ursula Konzett	Bronze	Alpine skiing	Men's slalom	1984	(Socialist Federal Republic of Yugoslavia) Sarajevo, Yugoslavia
Paul Frommelt	Bronze	Alpine skiing	Men's slalom	1988	Calgary, Canada
Tina Weirather	Bronze	Alpine skiing	Women's super-G	2018	Pyeongchang, South Korea

=== Winter Youth Olympics ===
One bronze medal has been credited to Liechtenstein at the Winter Youth Olympics.

Medals won at the Winter Youth Olympics
Name(s)	Medal	Sport	Event	Year	Location
Quentin Sanzo	Bronze	Bobsleigh	Boys' monobob	2020	Lausanne, Switzerland

== Medal tally by individual ==
Six individuals have won medals for the nation. According to official data of the International Olympic Committee, two people have won two or more Olympic medals for Liechtenstein.

Medal tally by individual
Person(s)	Gold	Silver	Bronze	Total
Hanni Wenzel	2	1	1	4
Andreas Wenzel	0	1	1	2
Willi Frommelt	0	0	1	1
Ursula Konzett	0	0	1	1
Paul Frommelt	0	0	1	1
Tina Weirather	0	0	1	1
Total	2	2	6	10
