= List of Liechtensteiners =

The list of Liechtensteiners is a list of notable people from or of the nation of Liechtenstein.

== Princely family ==
- Franz Joseph II, Prince of Liechtenstein, longest reigning monarch (1938–1989) in Europe from 1964 to 1984
- Prince Hans Adam II, current Head of State, one of the world's richest royals
- Prince Alois of Liechtenstein (born 1968), regent since 2004
- Sophie, Hereditary Princess of Liechtenstein

== Politicians ==
- Cornelia Gassner, first woman government councillor
- Otmar Hasler, former prime minister
- Maria Foser, first woman Deputy Government Councillor for Social Affairs
- Mario Frick, in the Guinness Book of Records as the world's youngest Prime Minister when he was elected.
- Carl von In der Maur, Governor of Liechtenstein
- Ernst Joseph Walch, former Secretary of State
- Klaus Tschütscher, former Prime Minister
- Andrea Willi, first woman Minister of Foreign Affairs

== Sports ==
=== Skiers ===
- Marco Büchel (born 1971)
- Markus Foser (born 1968)
- Paul Frommelt (born 1957)
- Willi Frommelt (born 1952)
- Ursula Konzett (born 1959)
- Tina Weirather (born 1989)
- Andreas Wenzel (born 1958), won one bronze and one silver Olympic medal 1980 and 1984, respectively for Alpine skiing.
- Hanni Wenzel (born 1956), won two gold medals and one silver medal in the 1980 Winter Olympics and a bronze one 1976 for Alpine skiing.

=== Football players ===
- Mario Frick (born 1974)
- Nicolas Hasler (born 1991)
- Pascal Foser (born 1992)
- Peter Jehle (born 1982)
- Wolfgang Ospelt (born 1965)

=== Racing ===
- Fabienne Wohlwend (born 1997) (W Series)

== Arts ==
- Ida Ospelt-Amann (1899-1996), poet
- Sabine Dünser (1977–2006), gothic and symphonic metal singer
- Maria Grabher-Meyer (1898–1970), poet and short story writer
- Josef Rheinberger (1839–1901), composer
- Hermine Rheinberger (1864–1932), writer

== Other ==
- Wolfgang Haas (born 1948), Archbishop of Vaduz, former Bishop of Chur
- Gilbert von In der Maur (1887-1959), military officer
- Peter Kaiser (1 October 1793 – 23 February 1864), historian, statesman
- John Latenser, Sr. (1858–1936), architect
