= Liechtenstein at the 1994 Winter Olympics =

- IOC code: LIE
- NOC: Liechtenstein Olympic Committee
- Website: www.olympic.li (in German and English)

in Lillehammer
- Competitors: 10 (9 men, 1 woman) in 3 sports
- Flag bearer: Markus Hasler (cross-country skiing)
- Medals: Gold 0 Silver 0 Bronze 0 Total 0

Winter Olympics appearances (overview)
- 1936; 1948; 1952; 1956; 1960; 1964; 1968; 1972; 1976; 1980; 1984; 1988; 1992; 1994; 1998; 2002; 2006; 2010; 2014; 2018; 2022; 2026

Liechtenstein competed at the 1994 Winter Olympics in Lillehammer, Norway.

== Competitors ==
The following is the list of number of competitors in the Games.

Sport	Men	Women	Total
Alpine skiing	6	1	7
Cross-country skiing	2	0	2
Luge	1	0	1
Total	9	1	10

== Alpine skiing ==
Men

Athlete	Event	Race 1	Race 2	Total	
Athlete	Event	Time	Time	Time	Rank
Marco Büchel	Downhill			1:48.97	40
Markus Foser	Downhill			1:48.93	39
Achim Vogt	Downhill			1:47.98	33
Jürgen Hasler	Downhill			1:47.62	29
Jürgen Hasler	Super-G			DNF	–
Achim Vogt	Super-G			DNF	–
Marco Büchel	Super-G			1:35.78	32
Daniel Vogt	Super-G			1:35.08	27
Hans Burkhard	Giant Slalom	1:32.73	DNF	DNF	–
Daniel Vogt	Giant Slalom	1:31.97	DNF	DNF	–
Marco Büchel	Giant Slalom	1:31.82	DNF	DNF	–
Achim Vogt	Giant Slalom	1:31.12	1:25.26	2:56.38	21

Men's combined

Athlete	Downhill	Slalom		Total	
Athlete	Time	Time 1	Time 2	Total time	Rank
Marco Büchel	1:40.82	53.60	1:13.43	3:47.85	33
Achim Vogt	1:38.53	55.29	52.41	3:26.23	24

Women

Athlete	Event	Race 1	Race 2	Total	
Athlete	Event	Time	Time	Time	Rank
Birgit Heeb-Batliner	Super-G			DNF	–
Birgit Heeb-Batliner	Giant Slalom	1:22.58	1:13.51	2:36.09	11

== Cross-country skiing ==
Men

Event	Athlete	Race	
Event	Athlete	Time	Rank
10 km C	Stefan Kunz	28:44.8	76
10 km C	Markus Hasler	27:17.1	55
15 km pursuit^{1} F	Stefan Kunz	44:59.6	64
15 km pursuit^{1} F	Markus Hasler	41:45.4	39
30 km F	Stefan Kunz	1'24:00.0	55
30 km F	Markus Hasler	1'18:18.7	21
50 km C	Stefan Kunz	2'20:38.1	38
50 km C	Markus Hasler	2'18:40.1	30

^{1} Starting delay based on 10 km results.
C = Classical style, F = Freestyle

== Luge ==
Men

Athlete	Run 1		Run 2		Run 3		Run 4		Total	
Athlete	Time	Rank	Time	Rank	Time	Rank	Time	Rank	Time	Rank
Marco Felder	52.279	27	52.445	28	52.122	26	52.563	29	3:29.409	27
