= Liechtenstein at the 1992 Winter Olympics =

- IOC code: LIE
- NOC: Liechtenstein Olympic Committee
- Website: www.olympic.li (in German and English)

in Albertville
- Competitors: 7 (6 men and 1 woman) in 2 sports
- Flag bearer: Birgit Heeb-Batliner (alpine skiing)
- Medals: Gold 0 Silver 0 Bronze 0 Total 0

Winter Olympics appearances (overview)
- 1936; 1948; 1952; 1956; 1960; 1964; 1968; 1972; 1976; 1980; 1984; 1988; 1992; 1994; 1998; 2002; 2006; 2010; 2014; 2018; 2022; 2026

Liechtenstein competed at the 1992 Winter Olympics in Albertville, France.

== Competitors ==
The following is the list of number of competitors in the Games.

Sport	Men	Women	Total
Alpine skiing	5	1	6
Cross-country skiing	1	0	1
Total	6	1	7

== Alpine skiing ==
Men

Athlete	Event	Race 1	Race 2	Total	
Athlete	Event	Time	Time	Time	Rank
Markus Foser	Downhill			DNF	–
Daniel Vogt	Super-G			DNF	–
Achim Vogt	Super-G			DNF	–
Marco Büchel	Super-G			1:17.25	36
Günther Marxer	Super-G			1:16.48	26
Daniel Vogt	Giant Slalom	DNF	–	DNF	–
Marco Büchel	Giant Slalom	DNF	–	DNF	–
Achim Vogt	Giant Slalom	1:08.68	1:06.02	2:14.70	26
Günther Marxer	Giant Slalom	1:06.69	1:04.46	2:11.15	15

Men's combined

Athlete	Downhill	Slalom		Total	
Athlete	Time	Time 1	Time 2	Points	Rank
Markus Foser	1:49.12	59.08	1:00.50	146.89	29
Daniel Vogt	1:48.97	55.95	57.88	112.92	24
Achim Vogt	1:47.09	1:05.98	1:01.88	172.91	30

Women

Athlete	Event	Race 1	Race 2	Total	
Athlete	Event	Time	Time	Time	Rank
Birgit Heeb	Super-G			1:27.22	30
Birigt Heeb	Giant Slalom	DNF	–	DNF	–

Women's combined

Athlete	Downhill	Slalom		Total	
Athlete	Time	Time 1	Time 2	Points	Rank
Birgit Heeb	1:28.90	39.34	45.28	164.25	20

== Cross-country skiing ==
Men

Event	Athlete	Race	
Event	Athlete	Time	Rank
10 km C	Markus Hasler	31:27.0	45
15 km pursuit^{1} F	Markus Hasler	43:10.6	36
30 km C	Markus Hasler	1'31:03.3	43

^{1} Starting delay based on 10 km results.
C = Classical style, F = Freestyle
