= Liechtenstein at the 1998 Winter Olympics =

- IOC code: LIE
- NOC: Liechtenstein Olympic Committee
- Website: www.olympic.li (in German and English)

in Nagano
- Competitors: 8 (5 men and 3 women) in 2 sports
- Flag bearer: Tamara Schädler (alpine skiing)
- Medals: Gold 0 Silver 0 Bronze 0 Total 0

Winter Olympics appearances (overview)
- 1936; 1948; 1952; 1956; 1960; 1964; 1968; 1972; 1976; 1980; 1984; 1988; 1992; 1994; 1998; 2002; 2006; 2010; 2014; 2018; 2022; 2026

Liechtenstein competed at the 1998 Winter Olympics in Nagano, Japan.

== Competitors ==
The following is the list of number of competitors in the Games.

Sport	Men	Women	Total
Alpine skiing	3	3	6
Cross-country skiing	2	0	2
Total	5	3	8

== Alpine skiing ==
Men

Athlete	Event	Race 1	Race 2	Total	
Athlete	Event	Time	Time	Time	Rank
Jürgen Hasler	Downhill			DNF	–
Jürgen Hasler	Super-G			1:38.32	26
Achim Vogt	Giant Slalom	DNF	–	DNF	–
Marco Büchel	Giant Slalom	1:22.52	1:19.47	2:41.99	14

Men's combined

Athlete	Slalom		Downhill	Total	
Athlete	Time 1	Time 2	Time	Total time	Rank
Jürgen Hasler	54.39	50.88	1:37.88	3:23.15	9

Women

Athlete	Event	Race 1	Race 2	Total	
Athlete	Event	Time	Time	Time	Rank
Tamara Schädler	Super-G			1:22.90	38
Diana Fehr	Giant Slalom	DNF	–	DNF	–
Tamara Schädler	Giant Slalom	DNF	–	DNF	–
Birgit Heeb-Batliner	Giant Slalom	1:21.27	1:33.43	2:54.70	9
Tamara Schädler	Slalom	49.74	50.27	1:40.01	23
Diana Fehr	Slalom	48.66	50.10	1:38.76	21

Women's combined

Athlete	Downhill	Slalom		Total	
Athlete	Time	Time 1	Time 2	Total time	Rank
Tamara Schädler	1:34.18	39.46	38.54	2:52.18	17

== Cross-country skiing ==
Men

Event	Athlete	Race	
Event	Athlete	Time	Rank
10 km C	Stefan Kunz	30:56.8	57
10 km C	Markus Hasler	28:55.2	20
15 km pursuit^{1} F	Markus Hasler	44:31.9	35
15 km pursuit^{1} F	Stefan Kunz	44:18.9	34
30 km C	Markus Hasler	1'42:17.4	35
30 km C	Stefan Kunz	1'39:33.3	14
50 km F	Stefan Kunz	2'16:36.2	28

^{1} Starting delay based on 10 km results.
C = Classical style, F = Freestyle
