= Liechtenstein at the 1976 Winter Olympics =

- IOC code: LIE
- NOC: Liechtenstein Olympic Committee
- Website: www.olympic.li (in German and English)

in Innsbruck
- Competitors: 9 (6 men, 3 women) in 3 sports
- Flag bearer: Ursula Konzett
- Medals Ranked 13th: Gold 0 Silver 0 Bronze 2 Total 2

Winter Olympics appearances (overview)
- 1936; 1948; 1952; 1956; 1960; 1964; 1968; 1972; 1976; 1980; 1984; 1988; 1992; 1994; 1998; 2002; 2006; 2010; 2014; 2018; 2022; 2026

Liechtenstein competed at the 1976 Winter Olympics in Innsbruck, Austria. The nation won its first ever medals in Olympic competition, both in alpine skiing.

== Medalists ==
| Medal | Name | Sport | Event |
|---|---|---|---|
| Bronze | Willi Frommelt | Alpine skiing | Men's slalom |
| Bronze | Hanni Wenzel | Alpine skiing | Women's slalom |

== Alpine skiing ==
Men

| Athlete | Event | Race 1 | | Race 2 | | Total | |
| Athlete | Event | Time | Rank | Time | Rank | Time | Rank |
|---|---|---|---|---|---|---|---|
| Andreas Wenzel | Downhill | | | | | 1:50.08 | 28 |
| Willi Frommelt | Downhill | | | | | 1:48.92 | 21 |
| Paul Frommelt | Giant Slalom | 1:52.69 | 38 | DNF | – | DNF | – |
| Andreas Wenzel | Giant Slalom | 1:48.53 | 20 | 1:47.72 | 20 | 3:36.25 | 20 |
| Willi Frommelt | Giant Slalom | 1:48.44 | 19 | 1:47.27 | 18 | 3:35.71 | 17 |
| Andreas Wenzel | Slalom | 1:02.51 | 12 | 1:06.22 | 12 | 2:08.73 | 10 |
| Willi Frommelt | Slalom | 59.98 | 1 | 1:04.30 | 4 | 2:04.28 | 3rd place, bronze medalist(s) |

Women

| Athlete | Event | Race 1 | | Race 2 | | Total | |
| Athlete | Event | Time | Rank | Time | Rank | Time | Rank |
|---|---|---|---|---|---|---|---|
| Ursula Konzett | Downhill | | | | | 1:51.53 | 24 |
| Hanni Wenzel | Downhill | | | | | 1:49.17 | 11 |
| Hanni Wenzel | Giant Slalom | | | | | 1:31.83 | 20 |
| Ursula Konzett | Giant Slalom | | | | | 1:31.59 | 18 |
| Ursula Konzett | Slalom | 48.82 | 10 | 47.53 | 12 | 1:36.35 | 11 |
| Hanni Wenzel | Slalom | 47.75 | 6 | 44.45 | 3 | 1:32.20 | 3rd place, bronze medalist(s) |

== Cross-country skiing ==
Women

| Event | Athlete | Race | |
| Event | Athlete | Time | Rank |
|---|---|---|---|
| 5 km | Claudia Sprenger | 19:51.66 | 40 |
| 10 km | Claudia Sprenger | 34:57.03 | 38 |

== Luge ==
Men

| Athlete | Run 1 | | Run 2 | | Run 3 | | Run 4 | | Total | |
| Athlete | Time | Rank | Time | Rank | Time | Rank | Time | Rank | Time | Rank |
|---|---|---|---|---|---|---|---|---|---|---|
| Rainer Gassner | DNF | – | – | – | – | – | – | – | DNF | – |
| Wolfgang Schädler | n/a | ? | n/a | ? | n/a | ? | DNF | – | DNF | – |
| Max Beck | 56.748 | 36 | 55.388 | 28 | 55.614 | 34 | 57.032 | 37 | 3:44.782 | 32 |

(Men's) Doubles

| Athletes | Run 1 | | Run 2 | | Total | |
| Athletes | Time | Rank | Time | Rank | Time | Rank |
|---|---|---|---|---|---|---|
| Max Beck; Wolfgang Schädler | 45.517 | 20 | 45.272 | 18 | 1:30.789 | 19 |
