= Liechtenstein at the 2002 Winter Olympics =

- IOC code: LIE
- NOC: Liechtenstein Olympic Committee
- Website: www.olympic.li (in German and English)

in Salt Lake City, Utah
- Competitors: 9 (7 men, 2 women) in 2 sports
- Flag bearer: Marco Büchel (alpine skiing)
- Medals: Gold 0 Silver 0 Bronze 0 Total 0

Winter Olympics appearances (overview)
- 1936; 1948; 1952; 1956; 1960; 1964; 1968; 1972; 1976; 1980; 1984; 1988; 1992; 1994; 1998; 2002; 2006; 2010; 2014; 2018; 2022; 2026

Liechtenstein was represented at the 2002 Winter Olympics in Salt Lake City, Utah, United States by the Liechtenstein Olympic Committee.

In total, nine athletes including seven men and two women represented Liechtenstein in two different sports including alpine skiing and cross-country skiing.

== Competitors ==
In total, nine athletes represented Liechtenstein at the 2002 Winter Olympics in Salt Lake City, Utah, United States across two different sports.

Sport	Men	Women	Total
Alpine skiing	5	2	7
Cross-country skiing	2	0	2
Total	7	2	9

== Alpine skiing ==
In total, seven Liechtensteiner athletes participated in the alpine skiing events – Marco Büchel, Markus Ganahl, Jürgen Hasler, Birgit Heeb-Batliner, Michael Riegler and Achim Vogt.

The men's downhill took place on 10 February 2002. Hasler completed the course in a time of one minute 41.76 seconds to finish 26th overall. Büchel completed the course in a time of one minute 41.86 seconds to finish joint 29th overall.

The men's super-G took place on 16 February 2002. Büchel completed the course in a time of one minute 23.52 seconds to finish joint 13th overall. Both Hasler and Riegler did not finish.

The women's giant slalom took place on 22 February 2002. Heeb-Batliner completed her first run in one minute 17.29 seconds and her second run in one minute 15.49 seconds. However, she was disqualified following her second run.

The men's giant slalom took place on 21 February 2002. Büchel completed his first run in one minute 13.67 seconds and his second run in one minute 12.22 seconds for a combined time of two minutes 25.89 seconds to finish 17th overall. Vogt completed his first run in one minute 14.84 seconds and his second run in one minute 12.74 seconds for a combined time of two minutes 27.58 seconds to finish 23rd overall. Ganahl completed his first run in one minute 14.7 seconds and his second run in one minute 13.22 seconds for a combined time of two minutes 27.92 seconds to finish 27th overall. Riegler completed his first run in one minute 16.16 seconds and his second run in one minute 14.58 seconds for a combined time of two minutes 30.74 seconds to finish 35th overall.

The men's slalom took place on 23 February 2002. Ganahl completed his first run in 51.85 seconds. He did not finish his second run.

Athlete	Event	Race 1	Race 2	Total	
Athlete	Event	Time	Time	Time	Rank
Marco Büchel	Men's downhill			1:41.86	29
Jürgen Hasler	Men's downhill			1:41.76	26
Michael Riegler	Men's super-G			DNF	–
Jürgen Hasler	Men's super-G			DNF	–
Marco Büchel	Men's super-G			1:23.52	13
Michael Riegler	Men's giant slalom	1:16.16	1:14.58	2:30.74	35
Achim Vogt	Men's giant slalom	1:14.84	1:12.74	2:27.58	23
Markus Ganahl	Men's giant slalom	1:14.70	1:13.22	2:27.92	27
Marco Büchel	Men's giant slalom	1:13.67	1:12.22	2:25.89	17
Markus Ganahl	Men's slalom	51.85	DNF	DNF	–
Birgit Heeb-Batliner	Women's giant slalom	1:17.29	DSQ	DSQ	–

== Cross-country skiing ==
In total, two Liechtensteiner athletes participated in the cross-country skiing events – Markus Hasler and Stefan Kunz.

The men's 2 x 10 km pursuit took place on 14 February 2002. Hasler completed the 10 km classical in a time of 27 minutes 52.1 seconds and Kunz completed the 10 km classical in 28 minutes 1.4 seconds. Hasler completed the 10 km freestyle in a time of 25 minutes 7.3 seconds to finish 26th overall and Kunz completed the 10 km freestyle in 26 minutes 14.2 seconds to finish 43rd overall.

Athlete	10 km C		10 km F pursuit^{1}	
Athlete	Time	Rank	Time	Final rank
Stefan Kunz	28:01.4	42 Q	26:14.2	43
Markus Hasler	27:52.1	41 Q	25:07.3	26

The men's sprint took place on 19 February 2002. Hasler completed the qualifying round in two minutes 53.74 seconds to advance to the quarter-finals. He completed his quarter-final in two minutes 53.3 seconds but did not advance to the semi-finals and finished 12th overall. Kunz completed the qualifying round in two minutes 55.91 seconds. He did not advance to the quarter-finals and finished 22nd overall.

Athlete	Qualifying round		Quarter finals		Semi finals		Finals	
Athlete	Time	Rank	Time	Rank	Time	Rank	Time	Final rank
Stefan Kunz	2:55.91	23	did not advance					
Markus Hasler	2:53.74	15 Q	2:53.3	3	did not advance			

The men's 30 km freestyle mass start took place on 9 February 2002. Hasler completed the course in a time of one hour 14 minutes 47 seconds to finish 25th overall. Kunz completed the course in a time of one hour 15 minutes 56.8 seconds to finish 31st overall.

The men's 50 km classical took place on 23 February 2002. Hasler completed the course in a time of two hours 20 minutes 31.8 seconds to finish 36th overall.

Event	Athlete	Race	
Event	Athlete	Time	Rank
30 km F	Stefan Kunz	1'15:56.8	31
30 km F	Markus Hasler	1'14:47.0	25
50 km C	Markus Hasler	2'20:31.8	36

^{1} Starting delay based on 10 km C. results.
C = Classical style, F = Freestyle
