= Liechtenstein at the 1984 Winter Olympics =

- IOC code: LIE
- NOC: Liechtenstein Olympic Committee
- Website: www.olympic.li (in German and English)

in Sarajevo
- Competitors: 10 (7 men, 3 women) in 3 sports
- Flag bearer: Günther Marxer (alpine skiing)
- Medals Ranked 16th: Gold 0 Silver 0 Bronze 2 Total 2

Winter Olympics appearances (overview)
- 1936; 1948; 1952; 1956; 1960; 1964; 1968; 1972; 1976; 1980; 1984; 1988; 1992; 1994; 1998; 2002; 2006; 2010; 2014; 2018; 2022; 2026

Liechtenstein competed at the 1984 Winter Olympics in Sarajevo, Yugoslavia.

== Medalists ==
Medal	Name	Sport	Event	Date
Bronze	Andreas Wenzel	Alpine skiing	Men's giant slalom	14 February
Bronze	Ursula Konzett	Alpine skiing	Women's slalom	17 February

== Alpine skiing ==
Men

Athlete	Event	Race 1		Race 2		Total	
Athlete	Event	Time	Rank	Time	Rank	Time	Rank
Hubert Hilti	Downhill					1:50.94	36
Günther Marxer	Downhill					1:47.43	13
Mario Konzett	Giant Slalom	DNF	–	–	–	DNF	–
Hubert Hilti	Giant Slalom	DNF	–	–	–	DNF	–
Günther Marxer	Giant Slalom	1:24.78	24	1:24.01	21	2:48.79	23
Andreas Wenzel	Giant Slalom	1:20.64	2	1:21.11	5	2:41.18	3rd place, bronze medalist(s)
Paul Frommelt	Slalom	DSQ	–	–	–	DSQ	–
Andreas Wenzel	Slalom	DNF	–	–	–	DNF	–
Mario Konzett	Slalom	DNF	–	–	–	DNF	–
Günther Marxer	Slalom	DNF	–	–	–	DNF	–

Women

Athlete	Event	Race 1		Race 2		Total	
Athlete	Event	Time	Rank	Time	Rank	Time	Rank
Jolanda Kindle	Downhill					1:16.89	25
Jolanda Kindle	Giant Slalom	DSQ	–	–	–	DSQ	–
Petra Wenzel	Giant Slalom	1:11.26	17	1:13.68	19	2:24.94	19
Ursula Konzett	Giant Slalom	1:10.93	15	DNF	–	DNF	–
Jolanda Kindle	Slalom	53.13	22	53.30	17	1:46.43	17
Petra Wenzel	Slalom	49.80	14	DNF	–	DNF	–
Ursula Konzett	Slalom	48.81	2	48.69	6	1:37.50	3rd place, bronze medalist(s)

- Hanni Wenzel, a double gold medalist in 1980, was banned from these Olympics by the International Ski Federation (FIS)
  for accepting promotional payments directly, rather than through the Liechtenstein ski federation.

== Cross-country skiing ==
Men

Event	Athlete	Race	
Event	Athlete	Time	Rank
15 km	Konstantin Ritter	45:41.5	42

== Luge ==
Men

Athlete	Run 1		Run 2		Run 3		Run 4		Total	
Athlete	Time	Rank	Time	Rank	Time	Rank	Time	Rank	Time	Rank
Wolfgang Schädler	46.815	13	47.019	14	46.654	11	46.509	11	3:06.997	11
