= Liechtenstein at the 1980 Winter Olympics =

- IOC code: LIE
- NOC: Liechtenstein Olympic Committee
- Website: www.olympic.li (in German and English)

in Lake Placid
- Competitors: 7 (4 men, 3 women) in 2 sports
- Flag bearer: Petra Wenzel (alpine skiing)
- Medals Ranked 6th: Gold 2 Silver 2 Bronze 0 Total 4

Winter Olympics appearances (overview)
- 1936; 1948; 1952; 1956; 1960; 1964; 1968; 1972; 1976; 1980; 1984; 1988; 1992; 1994; 1998; 2002; 2006; 2010; 2014; 2018; 2022; 2026; 2030

Liechtenstein competed at the 1980 Winter Olympics in Lake Placid, United States.

== Medalists ==
Medal	Name	Sport	Event
Gold	Hanni Wenzel	Alpine skiing	Women's giant slalom
Gold	Hanni Wenzel	Alpine skiing	Women's slalom
Silver	Andreas Wenzel	Alpine skiing	Men's giant slalom
Silver	Hanni Wenzel	Alpine skiing	Women's downhill

== Alpine skiing ==
Men

Athlete	Event	Race 1		Race 2		Total	
Athlete	Event	Time	Rank	Time	Rank	Time	Rank
Andreas Wenzel	Downhill					1:49.71	20
Paul Frommelt	Giant Slalom	DSQ	–	–	–	DSQ	–
Andreas Wenzel	Giant Slalom	1:20.17	1	1:21.32	4	2:41.49	2nd place, silver medalist(s)
Paul Frommelt	Slalom	DNF	–	–	–	DNF	–
Andreas Wenzel	Slalom	54.63	7	53.17	15	1:47.80	12

Women

Athlete	Event	Race 1		Race 2		Total	
Athlete	Event	Time	Rank	Time	Rank	Time	Rank
Petra Wenzel	Downhill					1:42.50	23
Hanni Wenzel	Downhill					1:38.22	2nd place, silver medalist(s)
Ursula Konzett	Giant Slalom	DNF	–	–	–	DNF	–
Petra Wenzel	Giant Slalom	1:18.75	26	1:30.28	16	2:49.03	19
Hanni Wenzel	Giant Slalom	1:14.33	1	1:27.33	3	2:41.66	1st place, gold medalist(s)
Ursula Konzett	Slalom	DNF	–	–	–	DNF	–
Petra Wenzel	Slalom	47.47	20	45.87	12	1:33.34	14
Hanni Wenzel	Slalom	42.50	1	42.59	1	1:25.09	1st place, gold medalist(s)

== Luge ==
Men

Athlete	Run 1		Run 2		Run 3		Run 4		Total	
Athlete	Time	Rank	Time	Rank	Time	Rank	Time	Rank	Time	Rank
Wolfgang Schädler	45.751	25	48.568	23	DNF	–	–	–	DNF	–
Rainer Gassner	45.283	19	45.956	20	45.907	19	44.928	11	3:02.074	13

(Men's) Doubles

Athletes	Run 1		Run 2		Total	
Athletes	Time	Rank	Time	Rank	Time	Rank
Wolfgang Schädler; Rainer Gassner	40.829	16	42.566	17	1:23.395	16
