= Liechtenstein at the 1968 Winter Olympics =

- IOC code: LIE (LIC used at these Games)
- NOC: Liechtenstein Olympic Committee
- Website: www.olympic.li (in German and English)

in Grenoble
- Competitors: 9 (8 men, 1 woman) in 2 sports
- Medals: Gold 0 Silver 0 Bronze 0 Total 0

Winter Olympics appearances (overview)
- 1936; 1948; 1952; 1956; 1960; 1964; 1968; 1972; 1976; 1980; 1984; 1988; 1992; 1994; 1998; 2002; 2006; 2010; 2014; 2018; 2022; 2026

Liechtenstein competed at the 1968 Winter Olympics in Grenoble, France.

== Alpine skiing ==
Men

Athlete	Event	Race 1		Race 2		Total	
Athlete	Event	Time	Rank	Time	Rank	Time	Rank
Arnold Beck	Downhill					DNF	–
Hans-Walter Schädler	Downhill					DNF	–
Wolfgang Ender	Downhill					2:08.08	37
Josef Gassner	Downhill					2:06.91	33
Hans-Walter Schädler	Giant Slalom	2:01.38	68	1:55.58	44	3:56.96	57
Albert Frick	Giant Slalom	1:57.75	60	1:58.15	57	3:55.90	56
Josef Gassner	Giant Slalom	1:51.10	37	1:51.28	28	3:42.38	31
Wolfgang Ender	Giant Slalom	1:50.57	36	1:52.86	37	3:43.43	32

Men's slalom

Athlete	Heat 1		Heat 2		Final					
Athlete	Time	Rank	Time	Rank	Time 1	Rank	Time 2	Rank	Total	Rank
Hans-Walter Schädler	56.07	3	55.21	2	did not advance					
Josef Gassner	DNF	–	57.74	2	did not advance					
Wolfgang Ender	55.55	3	56.73	1 QF	53.67	32	DSQ	–	DSQ	–

Women

Athlete	Event	Race 1		Race 2		Total	
Athlete	Event	Time	Rank	Time	Rank	Time	Rank
Marta Bühler	Downhill					1:53.53	38
Marta Bühler	Giant Slalom					2:06.20	33
Marta Bühler	Slalom	55.24	34	54.20	25	1:49.44	28

== Luge ==
Men

Athlete	Run 1		Run 2		Run 3		Total	
Athlete	Time	Rank	Time	Rank	Time	Rank	Time	Rank
Julius Schädler	DNF	–	–	–	–	–	DNF	–
Simon Beck	1:03.52	43	1:04.54	44	1:03.59	43	3:11.65	41
Werner Sele	1:00.92	35	1:01.27	35	1:01.69	39	3:03.88	36
