= Liechtenstein at the 1972 Winter Olympics =

- IOC code: LIE
- NOC: Liechtenstein Olympic Committee
- Website: www.olympic.li (in German and English)

in Sapporo
- Competitors: 4 (3 men, 1 woman) in 2 sports
- Flag bearer: Eduard Theodor von Falz-Fein
- Medals: Gold 0 Silver 0 Bronze 0 Total 0

Winter Olympics appearances (overview)
- 1936; 1948; 1952; 1956; 1960; 1964; 1968; 1972; 1976; 1980; 1984; 1988; 1992; 1994; 1998; 2002; 2006; 2010; 2014; 2018; 2022; 2026

Liechtenstein competed at the 1972 Winter Olympics in Sapporo, Japan.

== Alpine skiing ==
Men

Athlete	Event	Race 1		Race 2		Total	
Athlete	Event	Time	Rank	Time	Rank	Time	Rank
Willi Frommelt	Downhill					1:57.58	30
Herbert Marxer	Downhill					1:55.90	26
Herbert Marxer	Giant Slalom	1:38.13	32	1:41.57	21	3:19.70	24
Willi Frommelt	Giant Slalom	1:35.71	20	1:42.94	26	3:18.65	22

Men's slalom

Athlete	Classification		Final					
Athlete	Time	Rank	Time 1	Rank	Time 2	Rank	Total	Rank
Herbert Marxer	DSQ	–	DNF	–	–	–	DNF	–
Willi Frommelt	1:43.39	1	DSQ	–	–	–	DSQ	–

Women

Athlete	Event	Race 1		Race 2		Total	
Athlete	Event	Time	Rank	Time	Rank	Time	Rank
Marta Bühler	Downhill					1:40.06	10
Marta Bühler	Giant Slalom					1:33.15	10
Marta Bühler	Slalom	50.65	21	51.04	17	1:41.69	18

== Luge ==
Men

Athlete	Run 1		Run 2		Run 3		Run 4		Total	
Athlete	Time	Rank	Time	Rank	Time	Rank	Time	Rank	Time	Rank
Werner Sele	56.39	40	56.04	40	55.03	39	54.92	36	3:42.38	39

== Sources ==
- Official Olympic Reports
- Olympic Winter Games 1972, full results by sports-reference.com
