= Liechtenstein at the Olympics =

- IOC code: LIE
- NOC: Liechtenstein Olympic Committee
- Website: www.olympic.li (in German and English)
- Medals Ranked 34th: Gold 2 Silver 2 Bronze 6 Total 10

Summer appearances
- 1936; 1948; 1952; 1956; 1960; 1964; 1968; 1972; 1976; 1980; 1984; 1988; 1992; 1996; 2000; 2004; 2008; 2012; 2016; 2020; 2024

Winter appearances
- 1936; 1948; 1952; 1956; 1960; 1964; 1968; 1972; 1976; 1980; 1984; 1988; 1992; 1994; 1998; 2002; 2006; 2010; 2014; 2018; 2022; 2026

Liechtenstein first participated in the Olympic Games in 1936, and has sent athletes to compete in most Summer Olympic Games and Winter Olympic Games since then. The Liechtenstein Olympic Committee was created in 1935.

Liechtenstein is the smallest country in the world by population to have won an Olympic gold medal. Athletes from Liechtenstein have won a total of ten medals, all in alpine skiing. It is the only country to have won medals at the Winter, but not Summer Olympic Games. Liechtenstein has the most medals per capita of any country, with nearly one medal for every 3,600 inhabitants. Seven of its ten medals have been won by members of the same family: siblings Hanni and Andreas Wenzel, and Hanni's daughter Tina Weirather. Further, the brothers Willi and Paul Frommelt have won two of the other three; only Ursula Konzett has medaled for her country without being related to Wenzels or Frommelts.

Xaver Frick, a founding member of the country's national olympic committee, is the only Liechtenstein athlete to have competed in both the summer and winter Olympic games.

== Medal tables ==
=== Medals by Summer Games ===
Games	Athletes	Gold	Silver	Bronze	Total	Rank
1936 Berlin	6	0	0	0	0	–
1948 London	2	0	0	0	0	–
1952 Helsinki	2	0	0	0	0	–
1956 Melbourne	did not participate					
1960 Rome	5	0	0	0	0	–
1964 Tokyo	2	0	0	0	0	–
1968 Mexico City	2	0	0	0	0	–
1972 Munich	6	0	0	0	0	–
1976 Montreal	6	0	0	0	0	–
1980 Moscow	boycotted					
1984 Los Angeles	7	0	0	0	0	–
1988 Seoul	12	0	0	0	0	–
1992 Barcelona	7	0	0	0	0	–
1996 Atlanta	2	0	0	0	0	–
2000 Sydney	2	0	0	0	0	–
2004 Athens	1	0	0	0	0	–
2008 Beijing	2	0	0	0	0	–
2012 London	3	0	0	0	0	–
2016 Rio de Janeiro	3	0	0	0	0	–
2020 Tokyo	5	0	0	0	0	–
2024 Paris	1	0	0	0	0	–
2028 Los Angeles	future event					
2032 Brisbane	future event					
Total		0	0	0	0	–

=== Medals by Winter Games ===
Games	Athletes	Gold	Silver	Bronze	Total	Rank
1936 Garmisch-Partenkirchen	4	0	0	0	0	–
1948 St. Moritz	10	0	0	0	0	–
1952 Oslo	did not participate					
1956 Cortina d'Ampezzo	8	0	0	0	0	–
1960 Squaw Valley	3	0	0	0	0	–
1964 Innsbruck	6	0	0	0	0	–
1968 Grenoble	9	0	0	0	0	–
1972 Sapporo	4	0	0	0	0	–
1976 Innsbruck	9	0	0	2	2	14
1980 Lake Placid	7	2	2	0	4	6
1984 Sarajevo	10	0	0	2	2	16
1988 Calgary	13	0	0	1	1	16
1992 Albertville	7	0	0	0	0	–
1994 Lillehammer	10	0	0	0	0	–
1998 Nagano	8	0	0	0	0	–
2002 Salt Lake City	8	0	0	0	0	–
2006 Turin	5	0	0	0	0	–
2010 Vancouver	7	0	0	0	0	–
2014 Sochi	4	0	0	0	0	–
2018 Pyeongchang	3	0	0	1	1	28
2022 Beijing	2	0	0	0	0	–
2026 Milano Cortina	7	0	0	0	0	–
2030 French Alps	future event					
2034 Utah	future event					
Total		2	2	6	10	34

=== Medals by winter sport ===
Sport	Gold	Silver	Bronze	Total
Alpine skiing	2	2	6	10
Totals (1 entries)	2	2	6	10

== List of medalists ==
Medal	Name	Games	Sport	Event
Bronze	Willi Frommelt	1976 Innsbruck	Alpine skiing	Men's slalom
Bronze	Hanni Wenzel	1976 Innsbruck	Alpine skiing	Women's slalom
Gold	Hanni Wenzel	1980 Lake Placid	Alpine skiing	Women's giant slalom
Gold	Hanni Wenzel	1980 Lake Placid	Alpine skiing	Women's slalom
Silver	Hanni Wenzel	1980 Lake Placid	Alpine skiing	Women's downhill
Silver	Andreas Wenzel	1980 Lake Placid	Alpine skiing	Men's giant slalom
Bronze	Andreas Wenzel	1984 Sarajevo	Alpine skiing	Men's giant slalom
Bronze	Ursula Konzett	1984 Sarajevo	Alpine skiing	Women's slalom
Bronze	Paul Frommelt	1988 Calgary	Alpine skiing	Men's slalom
Bronze	Tina Weirather	2018 Pyeongchang	Alpine skiing	Women's super-G

== See also ==
- List of flag bearers for Liechtenstein at the Olympics
- Category:Olympic competitors for Liechtenstein
- Liechtenstein at the Paralympics
