= Liechtenstein at the 1964 Winter Olympics =

- IOC code: LIE
- NOC: Liechtenstein Olympic Committee
- Website: www.olympic.li (in German and English)

in Innsbruck
- Competitors: 6 (men) in 2 sports
- Medals: Gold 0 Silver 0 Bronze 0 Total 0

Winter Olympics appearances (overview)
- 1936; 1948; 1952; 1956; 1960; 1964; 1968; 1972; 1976; 1980; 1984; 1988; 1992; 1994; 1998; 2002; 2006; 2010; 2014; 2018; 2022; 2026

Liechtenstein competed at the 1964 Winter Olympics in Innsbruck, Austria.

== Alpine skiing ==
Men

Athlete	Event	Race	
Athlete	Event	Time	Rank
Josef Gassner	Downhill	2:37.38	53
August Wolfinger	Downhill	2:37.25	52
Hans-Walter Schädler	Downhill	2:35.84	48
Josef Gassner	Giant Slalom	2:10.67	47
August Wolfinger	Giant Slalom	2:10.64	46
Hans-Walter Schädler	Giant Slalom	2:05.08	40

Men's slalom

Athlete	Qualifying				Final					
Athlete	Time 1	Rank	Time 2	Rank	Time 1	Rank	Time 2	Rank	Total	Rank
August Wolfinger	1:09.75	66	1:07.72	47	did not advance					
Josef Gassner	1:05.78	57	1:01.90	32	did not advance					
Hans-Walter Schädler	1:01.53	48	59.62	24 QF	1:20.29	37	1:11.71	37	2:32.00	36

== Luge ==
Men

Athlete	Run 1		Run 2		Run 3		Run 4		Total	
Athlete	Time	Rank	Time	Rank	Time	Rank	Time	Rank	Time	Rank
Johann Schädler	1:03.16	30	DNF	–	–	–	–	–	DNF	–
Magnus Schädler	1:03.16	30	1:03.26	27	1:05.75	30	1:04.94	30	4:17.11	30
Hans Nägele	59.65	27	1:04.56	29	1:00.65	27	1:01.43	28	4:06.29	27
