= Liechtenstein at the 2010 Winter Olympics =

- IOC code: LIE
- NOC: Liechtenstein Olympic Committee
- Website: www.olympic.li (in German and English)

in Vancouver
- Competitors: 7 in 2 sports
- Flag bearer: Richard Wunder
- Medals: Gold 0 Silver 0 Bronze 0 Total 0

Winter Olympics appearances (overview)
- 1936; 1948; 1952; 1956; 1960; 1964; 1968; 1972; 1976; 1980; 1984; 1988; 1992; 1994; 1998; 2002; 2006; 2010; 2014; 2018; 2022; 2026

Liechtenstein sent a delegation to compete at the 2010 Winter Olympics in Vancouver, British Columbia, Canada from 12–28 February 2010. The delegation consisted of seven athletes, two alpine skiers and five bobsledders. The Liechtenstein team did not win any medals at this Olympics.

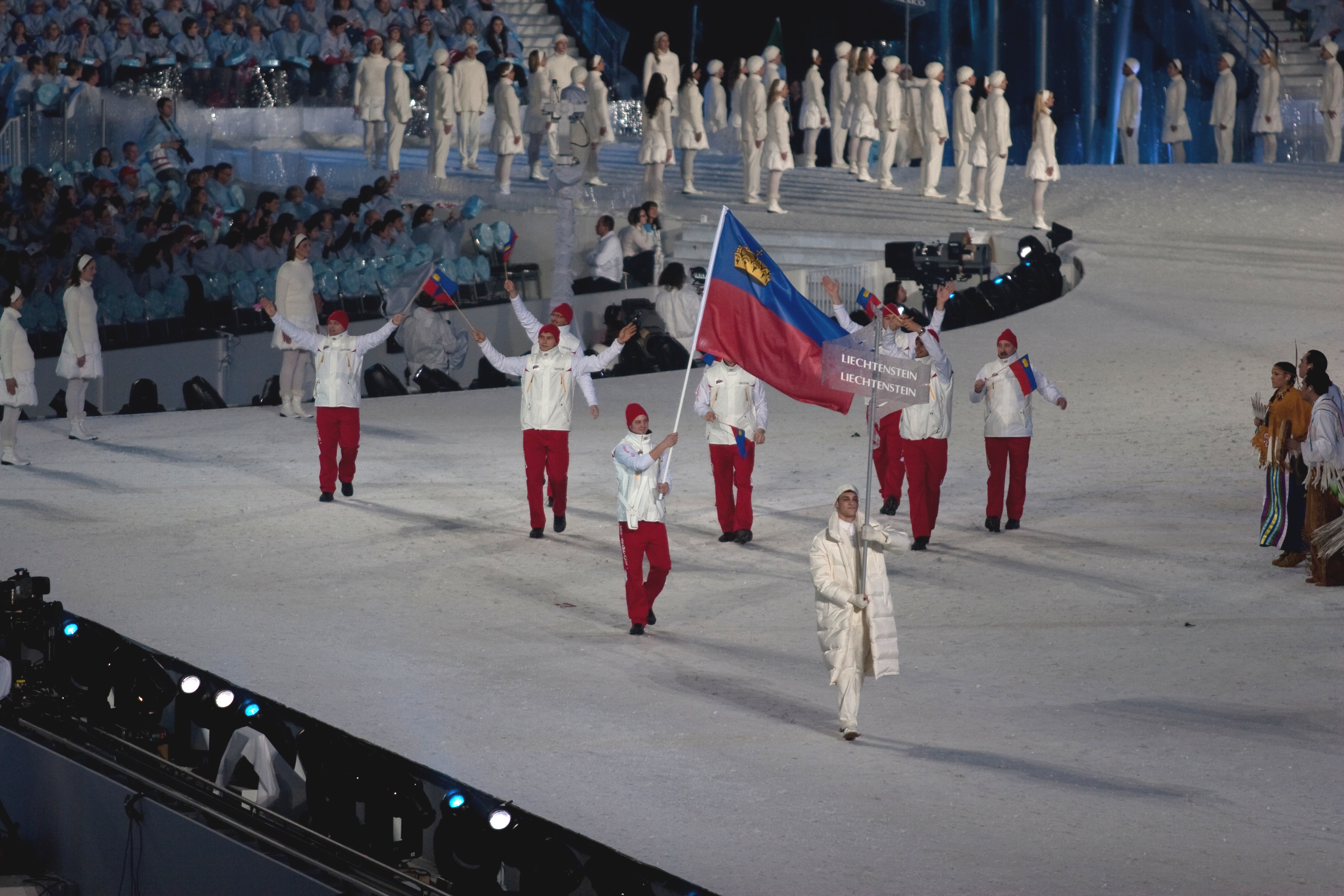
The athletes entering the stadium during the opening ceremonies.

== Alpine skiing ==
Athlete	Event	Final			
Athlete	Event	Run 1	Run 2	Total	Rank
Marco Büchel	Men's downhill			1:54.84	8
Marco Büchel	Men's super-G			DNF	-
Marina Nigg	Women's slalom	53.78	53.05	1:46.83	22

- Tina Weirather did not compete due to injury suffered on 23 January 2010.

== Bobsleigh ==
Athlete	Event	Final					
Athlete	Event	Run 1	Run 2	Run 3	Run 4	Total	Rank
Michael Klingler; Thomas Dürr	Two-man	56.18	DNS	-	-	-	-
Michael Klingler; Jürgen Berginz; Thomas Dürr; Richard Wunder	Four-man	DNS	-	-	-	-	-

- Benedikt Lampert (alternate)

The four-man team was forced to withdraw after pilot Michael Klingler began suffering from a recurring concussion problem following the crash in the two-man event.
