= Liechtenstein at the 2006 Winter Olympics =

- IOC code: LIE
- NOC: Liechtenstein Olympic Committee
- Website: www.olympic.li (in German and English)

in Turin
- Competitors: 5 (3 men, 2 women) in 2 sports
- Flag bearer: Jessica Walter
- Medals: Gold 0 Silver 0 Bronze 0 Total 0

Winter Olympics appearances (overview)
- 1936; 1948; 1952; 1956; 1960; 1964; 1968; 1972; 1976; 1980; 1984; 1988; 1992; 1994; 1998; 2002; 2006; 2010; 2014; 2018; 2022; 2026

Liechtenstein competed at the 2006 Winter Olympics in Turin, Italy.

== Alpine skiing ==
Athlete	Event	Final				
Athlete	Event	Run 1	Run 2	Run 3	Total	Rank
Marco Büchel	Men's downhill	n/a			1:50.04	7
Marco Büchel	Men's super-G	n/a			1:31.22	6
Marco Büchel	Men's giant slalom	did not finish				
Claudio Sprecher	Men's downhill	n/a			1:53.34	35
Claudio Sprecher	Men's super-G	did not finish				
Claudio Sprecher	Men's giant slalom	did not finish				
Claudio Sprecher	Men's combined	1:41.01	51.77	51.30	3:24.08	32
Jessica Walter	Women's slalom	45.37	49.73	n/a	1:35.10	32
Tina Weirather	Women's downhill	did not finish				
Tina Weirather	Women's super-G	n/a			1:35.34	33

Note: In the men's combined, run 1 is the downhill, and runs 2 and 3 are the slalom. In the women's combined, run 1 and 2 are the slalom, and run 3 the downhill.

== Cross-country skiing ==
Distance

Athlete	Event	Final	
Athlete	Event	Total	Rank
Markus Hasler	Men's 30 km pursuit	1:17:10.9	11
Markus Hasler	Men's 50 km freestyle	2:08:29.0	39
