= Liechtenstein at the 1988 Winter Olympics =

- IOC code: LIE
- NOC: Liechtenstein Olympic Committee
- Website: www.olympic.li (in German and English)

in Calgary
- Competitors: 13 (11 men and 2 women) in 3 sports
- Flag bearer: Andreas Wenzel (alpine skiing)
- Medals Ranked 16th: Gold 0 Silver 0 Bronze 1 Total 1

Winter Olympics appearances (overview)
- 1936; 1948; 1952; 1956; 1960; 1964; 1968; 1972; 1976; 1980; 1984; 1988; 1992; 1994; 1998; 2002; 2006; 2010; 2014; 2018; 2022; 2026

Liechtenstein competed at the 1988 Winter Olympics in Calgary, Alberta, Canada.

== Medalists ==
Medal	Name	Sport	Event	Date
Bronze	Paul Frommelt	Alpine skiing	Men's slalom	27 February

== Competitors ==
The following is the list of number of competitors in the Games.

Sport	Men	Women	Total
Alpine skiing	8	2	10
Cross-country skiing	3	0	3
Total	11	2	13

== Alpine skiing ==
Men

Athlete	Event	Race 1	Race 2	Total	
Athlete	Event	Time	Time	Time	Rank
Robert Büchel	Downhill			2:08.66	39
Gregor Hoop	Downhill			2:08.50	38
Silvio Wille	Downhill			2:07.77	36
Robert Büchel	Super-G			DNF	–
Silvio Wille	Super-G			1:46.08	28
Günther Marxer	Super-G			1:44.16	17
Andreas Wenzel	Super-G			1:43.00	12
Silvio Wille	Giant Slalom	1:09.20	1:05.88	2:15.08	29
Robert Büchel	Giant Slalom	1:08.55	DNF	DNF	–
Günther Marxer	Giant Slalom	1:08.00	1:04.72	2:12.72	25
Andreas Wenzel	Giant Slalom	1:05.65	1:03.38	2:09.03	6
Silvio Wille	Slalom	DSQ	–	DSQ	–
Gerald Näscher	Slalom	DNF	–	DNF	–
Gregor Hoop	Slalom	DNF	–	DNF	–
Paul Frommelt	Slalom	51.69	48.15	1:39.84	3rd place, bronze medalist(s)

Men's combined

Athlete	Downhill	Slalom		Total	
Athlete	Time	Time 1	Time 2	Points	Rank
Silvio Wille	2:21.71	DSQ	–	DSQ	–
Paul Frommelt	1:56.82	43.33	43.20	122.12	16
Robert Büchel	1:53.96	49.96	45.42	136.70	20
Gregor Hoop	1:53.21	45.95	44.68	114.62	14

Women

Athlete	Event	Race 1	Race 2	Total	
Athlete	Event	Time	Time	Time	Rank
Jacqueline Vogt	Downhill			DNF	–
Jolanda Kindle	Downhill			1:32.88	26
Jacqueline Vogt	Super-G			DNF	–
Jolanda Kindle	Giant Slalom	DNF	–	DNF	–
Jacqueline Vogt	Giant Slalom	1:03.95	1:10.69	2:14.64	21
Jacqueline Vogt	Slalom	53.94	DNF	DNF	–
Jolanda Kindle	Slalom	52.56	DSQ	DSQ	–

Women's combined

Athlete	Downhill	Slalom		Total	
Athlete	Time	Time 1	Time 2	Points	Rank
Jolanda Kindle	1:21.23	41.82	43.60	112.72	16
Jacqueline Vogt	1:20.81	43.17	45.14	130.22	18

== Cross-country skiing ==
Men

Event	Athlete	Race	
Event	Athlete	Time	Rank
15 km C	Konstantin Ritter	DNF	–
15 km C	Patrick Hasler	47:07.3	51
15 km C	Benjamin Eberle	46:49.3	50
30 km C	Patrick Hasler	1'43:26.7	74
30 km C	Konstantin Ritter	1'37:47.6	58
30 km C	Benjamin Eberle	1'34:53.8	47

C = Classical style, F = Freestyle

== Luge ==
Men

Athlete	Run 1		Run 2		Run 3		Run 4		Total	
Athlete	Time	Rank	Time	Rank	Time	Rank	Time	Rank	Time	Rank
Peter Beck	47.319	20	DNF	–	–	–	–	–	DNF	–
