= Liechtenstein at the 1956 Winter Olympics =

- IOC code: LIE (LIC used at these Games)
- NOC: Liechtenstein Olympic Committee
- Website: www.olympic.li (in German and English)

in Cortina d'Ampezzo
- Competitors: 8 (men) in 2 sports
- Flag bearer: Eduard Theodor von Falz-Fein
- Medals: Gold 0 Silver 0 Bronze 0 Total 0

Winter Olympics appearances (overview)
- 1936; 1948; 1952; 1956; 1960; 1964; 1968; 1972; 1976; 1980; 1984; 1988; 1992; 1994; 1998; 2002; 2006; 2010; 2014; 2018; 2022; 2026

Liechtenstein competed at the 1956 Winter Olympics in Cortina d'Ampezzo, Italy.

== Alpine skiing ==
Men

Athlete	Event	Race 1		Race 2		Total	
Athlete	Event	Time	Rank	Time	Rank	Time	Rank
Hermann Kindle	Downhill					DSQ	–
Max von Hohenlohe	Downhill					5:15.8	45
Leopold Schädler	Downhill					4:23.7	40
Franz Beck	Downhill					3:36.8	26
Ewald Eberle	Giant Slalom					4:11.6	73
Theodor Sele	Giant Slalom					4:09.5	70
Leopold Schädler	Giant Slalom					4:03.3	67
Franz Beck	Giant Slalom					3:52.6	59
Leopold Schädler	Slalom	2:24.1	54	2:45.8	52	5:09.9	53
Ewald Eberle	Slalom	2:22.2	53	2:39.6	49	5:01.8	49
Theodor Sele	Slalom	2:16.7	51	2:31.1	43	4:47.8	45
Franz Beck	Slalom	2:04.0	45	2:13.8	26	4:17.8	35

== Bobsleigh ==
Sled	Athletes	Event	Run 1		Run 2		Run 3		Run 4		Total	
Sled	Athletes	Event	Time	Rank	Time	Rank	Time	Rank	Time	Rank	Time	Rank
LIE-1	Moritz Heidegger; Weltin Wolfinger	Two-man	DNF	–	–	–	–	–	–	–	DNF	–

== Sources ==
- Official Olympic Reports
- Olympic Winter Games 1956, full results by sports-reference.com
