= Liechtenstein at the 2018 Winter Olympics =

- Flag of Liechtenstein
- IOC code: LIE
- NOC: Liechtenstein Olympic Committee
- Website: www.olympic.li/en

in Pyeongchang, South Korea 9–25 February 2018
- Competitors: 3 (2 men and 1 woman) in 2 sports
- Flag bearer: Marco Pfiffner
- Medals Ranked 28th: Gold 0 Silver 0 Bronze 1 Total 1

Winter Olympics appearances (overview)
- 1936; 1948; 1952; 1956; 1960; 1964; 1968; 1972; 1976; 1980; 1984; 1988; 1992; 1994; 1998; 2002; 2006; 2010; 2014; 2018; 2022; 2026

Liechtenstein competed at the 2018 Winter Olympics in Pyeongchang, South Korea, from 9 to 25 February 2018. The country's participation in Pyeongchang marked its 19th appearance at the Winter Olympics since its debut in the 1936 Games.

Liechtenstein was represented by a three athletes, including a woman athlete. Marco Pfiffner served as the country's flag-bearer during the opening ceremony and a volunteer carried the flag during the closing ceremony. On 17 February, Tina Weirather won the bronze medal in alpine skiing and became Liechtenstein's first medalist since the 1988 Winter Olympics in Calgary, when Paul Frommelt won the bronze medal in the men's slalom event. The country ranked 28th in the medal table.

== Background ==
The Liechtenstein Olympic Committeewas recognized by the International Olympic Committee in 1935. The nation made its first Olympics appearance at the 1936 Winter Olympics. The current edition marked its 19th appearance at the Winter Games. The 2018 Winter Olympics were held in Pyeongchang, South Korea between 9 and 25 February 2018. Liechtenstein was represented by three athletes. Marco Pfiffner served as the country's flag-bearer during the opening ceremony. A volunteer carried the flag during the closing ceremony.

== Medalists ==
On 17 February, Tina Weirather won the bronze medal in alpine skiing and became Liechtenstein's first medalist since the 1988 Winter Olympics in Calgary, when Paul Frommelt won the bronze medal in the men's slalom event. The country ranked 28th in the medal table.

Medal	Name	Sport	Event	Date
Bronze	Tina Weirather	Alpine skiing	Women's super-G	17 February

== Competitors ==
The team consisted of three athletes.

Sport	Men	Women	Total
Alpine skiing	1	1	2
Cross-country skiing	1	0	1
Total	2	1	3

== Alpine skiing ==
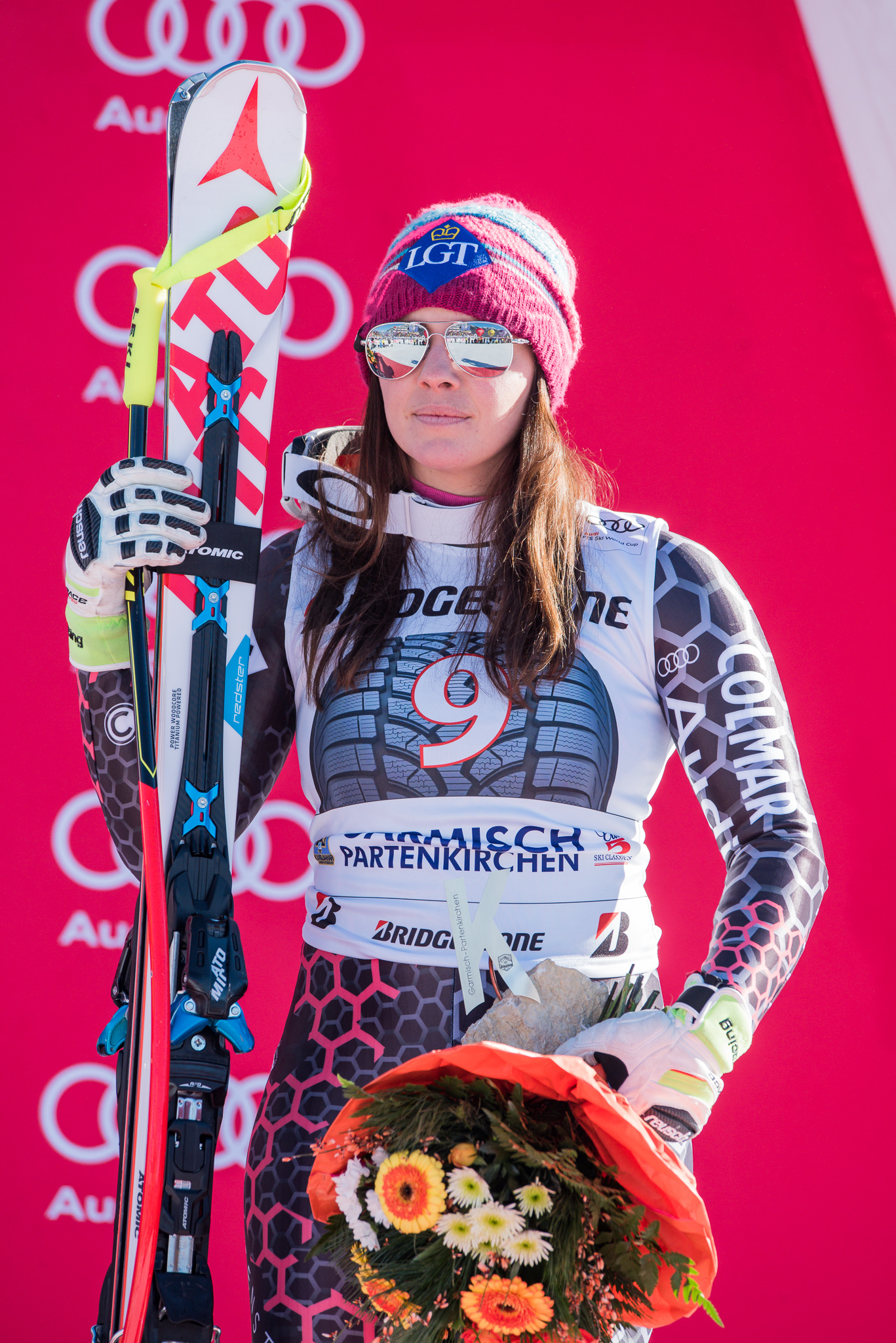
Tina Weirather participated in her third Olympics

Liechtenstein qualified two athletes, one male and one female. Marco Pfiffner participated in the alpine skiing events for the second consecutive Winter Games. In the women's events, Tina Weirather participated in her third Winter Games.

The Alpine skiing events were held at the Jeongseon Alpine Centre in Bukpyeong. The course for the events was designed by former Olympic champion Bernhard Russi. The weather was cold and windy during the events, and it was the coldest since the 1994 Winter Olympics at Lillehammer. Pfiffner recorded his best finish in the men's slalom event, after he was ranked 25th amongst the 106 competitors. In the women's downhill event, Weirather crossed the course in over a minute and 39.85 seconds to be ranked fourth and miss out on the medal places by 0.16 seconds. In the super-G event, she won the bronze medal.

Athlete	Event	Run 1		Run 2		Total	
Athlete	Event	Time	Rank	Time	Rank	Time	Rank
Marco Pfiffner	Men's downhill	—				1:45.61	43
Marco Pfiffner	Men's super-G	—				1:28.57	36
Marco Pfiffner	Men's combined	1:22.54	44	DNF			
Marco Pfiffner	Men's slalom	51.09	28	52.22	24	1:43.31	25
Tina Weirather	Women's downhill	—				1:39.85	4
Tina Weirather	Women's super-G	—				1:21.22	3rd place, bronze medalist(s)
Tina Weirather	Women's giant slalom	1:14.08	25	1:10.14	17	2:24.22	22

== Cross-country skiing ==
As per the "A" standard, athletes with a maximum of 100 distance points were allowed to compete in both the sprint and distance events. NOCs which did not have any athlete meeting the "A" standard were allowed to enter one competitor in the distance event provided that they satisfied the "B" standard of having a maximum of 300 distance points at the end of qualifying on 20 January 2018. Liechtenstein qualified two athletes, one male and one female. However, the country had only one participant in the Games. This was Martin Vögeli's debut Olympic appearance. He had previously participated in the skiing events at the 2012 Winter Youth Olympics.

The main event was held at the Alpensia Cross-Country Skiing Centre. In the men's 15 km freestyle event, Vögeli completed the 15 km (9.3 mi) course in 36:57.0. He finished the race in 52nd position (out of 119 competitors), more than two minutes behind the winner, Dario Cologna of Switzerland. In the 30 km skiathlon event, he clocked over one hour and 16 minutes to be ranked 59th.

Athlete	Event	Classical		Freestyle		Total		
Athlete	Event	Time	Rank	Time	Rank	Time	Deficit	Rank
Martin Vögeli	Men's 15 km freestyle	—				36:57.0	+3:13.1	52
Martin Vögeli	Men's 30 km skiathlon	44:55.5	57	41:12.7	59	1:26:08.2	+9:48.2	59

== See also ==
- Liechtenstein at the 2018 Summer Youth Olympics
