= Thomas Dürr =

Thomas Dürr may refer to:

- Thomas D (Thomas Dürr, born 1968), rapper in the German hip hop group Die Fantastischen Vier
- Thomas Dürr (bobsledder) (born 1978), bobsledder from Liechtenstein
