= Petra Wenzel =

Liechtenstein alpine skier (born 1961)

Personal information
- Born: 20 November 1961 (age 64) Grabs, Saint Gallen, Switzerland
- Height: 164 cm (5 ft 5 in)

Skiing career
- Sport: Alpine skiing
- Club: Skiclub Schaan
- Retired: 1984
- Disciplines: Slalom, giant slalom, Downhill
- World Cup debut: 1979, Lake Placid

Olympics
- Teams: (Liechtenstein); 1980 Winter Olympics; 1984 Winter Olympics

World Championships
- Teams: (Liechtenstein); 1980 Lake Placid†; 1982 Schladming^{†} The 1980 FIS Alpine Ski World Championship took place during the Winter Olympic games.

Petra Wenzel (born 20 November 1961 in Grabs, Saint Gallen, Switzerland) is a Liechtensteiner former alpine skier who competed in the 1980 Winter Olympics and 1984 Winter Olympics.

== Career ==
Wenzel made her World Cup debut in 1979 at Lake Placid, finishing 18th in the downhill.

She was selected to represent Liechtenstein at the 1980 Winter Olympics, where she competed in Slalom, giant slalom and Downhill races. Her best result was 14th in the slalom competition. She was selected as flagbearer for her country during the opening ceremony. She also represented her Liechtenstein at the 1980 FIS Alpine World Ski Championships finishing 5th in the giant slalom.

She would once again represent her country in the 1982 World Ski Championship in Schladming, finishing 4th in the giant slalom.

Wenzel continued to compete in the FIS World Cup until 1984. Her primary disciplines were Slalom and giant slalom, only competing in Downhill on her debut and at the 1980 Olympics. Her best results were a pair of fourth places at Berchtesgaden in January 1982, and Mairbor in February 1983 both in the slalom discipline.

Her final professional races came at the 1984 Winter Olympics in Sarajevo. In the giant slalom, finishing 19th and in the slalom failing to finish.

== Personal life ==
Wenzel lives in Planken, Liechtenstein. Her siblings, Hanni and Andreas Wenzel won the Ski World Cup in the 1979/80 season. Her daughter is Jessica Walter who represented Liechtenstein at the 2006 Winter Olympics. Jessica won Silver in the 2004 World Junior Alpine Skiing Championships. She is the aunt of successful ski racer, Tina Weirather.
