= Liechtenstein at the 1948 Winter Olympics =

- IOC code: LIE
- NOC: Liechtenstein Olympic Committee
- Website: www.olympic.li (in German and English)

in St. Moritz
- Competitors: 10 (men) in 2 sports
- Flag bearer: Christof Frommelt
- Medals: Gold 0 Silver 0 Bronze 0 Total 0

Winter Olympics appearances (overview)
- 1936; 1948; 1952; 1956; 1960; 1964; 1968; 1972; 1976; 1980; 1984; 1988; 1992; 1994; 1998; 2002; 2006; 2010; 2014; 2018; 2022; 2026

Liechtenstein competed at the 1948 Winter Olympics in St. Moritz, Switzerland.

== Alpine skiing ==
The Liechtenstein alpine skiing team consisted of Konstantin von Padua (delegation leader), Theodor Sele, Leopold Leopold Schädler, Max Gassner, and Franz Beck. All of whom except Padua were from Triesenberg.

Men

Athlete	Event	Race 1		Race 2		Total	
Athlete	Event	Time	Rank	Time	Rank	Time	Rank
Konstantin von Padua	Downhill					5:04.1	99
Theodor Sele	Downhill					4:24.1	90
Leopold Schädler	Downhill					4:00.0	79
Max Gassner	Downhill					3:53.0	73
Franz Beck	Downhill					3:38.3	55

Men's combined

The downhill part of this event was held along with the main medal event of downhill skiing. For athletes competing in both events, the same time was used (see table above for the results). The slalom part of the event was held separate from the main medal event of slalom skiing (included in table below).

Athlete	Slalom			Total (downhill + slalom)	
Athlete	Time 1	Time 2	Rank	Points	Rank
Max Gassner	2:09.0	1:46.9	65	76.56	62
Franz Beck	1:46.2	1:23.8	53	48.37	47
Leopold Schädler	1:40.0	1:17.1	41	54.48	50
Theodor Sele	1:37.5	1:30.8	51	72.78	58

== Cross-country skiing ==
The Liechtenstein cross-country skiing team consisted of Christof Frommelt and Erwin Jehle from Schaan, and Egon Matt and Arthur Meier from Mauren. Xaver Frick from Balzers also competed.

Men

Event	Athlete	Race	
Event	Athlete	Time	Rank
18 km	Erwin Jehle	1'49:26	83
18 km	Egon Matt	1'48:41	82
18 km	Christof Frommelt	1'42:35	79

Men's 4 x 10 km relay

Athletes	Race	
Athletes	Time	Rank
Christof Frommelt; Arthur Meier; Xaver Frick; Egon Matt	3'35:39	11

== Sources ==
- Comité Olympique Suisse (January 1951). Rapport Général sur les V^{es} Jeux Olympiques d'hiver St-Moritz 1948 (PDF) (in French). Lausanne: H. Jaunin. Archived from the original (PDF) on 2008-04-10.
- Olympic Winter Games 1948, full results by sports-reference.com
