= Liechtenstein at the 2014 Winter Olympics =

- IOC code: LIE
- NOC: Liechtenstein Olympic Committee
- Website: www.olympic.li (in German and English)

in Sochi
- Competitors: 4 in 2 sports
- Flag bearer: Tina Weirather
- Medals: Gold 0 Silver 0 Bronze 0 Total 0

Winter Olympics appearances (overview)
- 1936; 1948; 1952; 1956; 1960; 1964; 1968; 1972; 1976; 1980; 1984; 1988; 1992; 1994; 1998; 2002; 2006; 2010; 2014; 2018; 2022; 2026

Liechtenstein competed at the 2014 Winter Olympics in Sochi, Russia, from 7 to 23 February 2014. Liechtenstein's Olympic Committee nominated 4 athletes for the Olympics.

The 2014 Games marked the first time a Liechtenstein Olympic team competed in Russia, as Liechtenstein and 64 western countries took part at the American-led boycott in the 1980 Summer Olympics held in Moscow due to the Soviet–Afghan War.

== Alpine skiing ==
According to the quota allocation released on 20 January 2014, Liechtenstein has seven athletes in qualifying position. However the National Olympic Committee only decided to send three athletes. Weirather had to withdraw from the combined, and then the downhill after suffering a bone bruise on her knee and shin. She eventually was forced to withdraw from the Super-G as well.

Athlete	Event	Run 1		Run 2		Total	
Athlete	Event	Time	Rank	Time	Rank	Time	Rank
Marco Pfiffner	Men's giant slalom	1:27.64	46	1:29.08	44	2:56.72	42
Marco Pfiffner	Men's slalom	53.46	47	1:02.02	26	1:55.48	24
Marina Nigg	Women's slalom	57.47	27	53.17	18	1:50.64	21
Tina Weirather	Women's downhill	—N/a				DNS	
Tina Weirather	Women's super-G	—N/a				DNS	
Tina Weirather	Women's combined	DNS					

== Cross-country skiing ==
According to the quota allocation released on 20 January 2014, Liechtenstein has one athlete in qualification position.

Distance

Athlete	Event	Classical		Freestyle		Final		
Athlete	Event	Time	Rank	Time	Rank	Time	Deficit	Rank
Philipp Haelg	Men's 15 km classical	—N/a				40:41.5	+2:11.8	27
Philipp Haelg	Men's 30 km skiathlon	37:51.8	44	34:22.7	41	1:12:47.8	+4:32.4	43
