= Johann Schädler =

Johann Schädler may refer to:

- Johann Schädler (luger)
- Johann Schädler (politician)
