= Liechtenstein at the 1960 Winter Olympics =

- IOC code: LIE
- NOC: Liechtenstein Olympic Committee
- Website: www.olympic.li (in German and English)

in Squaw Valley
- Competitors: 3 (men) in 1 sport
- Medals: Gold 0 Silver 0 Bronze 0 Total 0

Winter Olympics appearances (overview)
- 1936; 1948; 1952; 1956; 1960; 1964; 1968; 1972; 1976; 1980; 1984; 1988; 1992; 1994; 1998; 2002; 2006; 2010; 2014; 2018; 2022; 2026

Liechtenstein participated at the 1960 Winter Olympics in Squaw Valley, United States, held between 18 and 28 February 1960. The country's participation in the Games marked its fourth appearance at the Winter Olympics since its debut in the 1936 Games. The Liechtenstein team consisted of three athletes who competed in a single sport. The country did not win any medals in the event.

== Background ==
Liechtenstein made its first Olympic appearances at the Winter Games of 1936. A National Olympic Committee for Liechtenstein was established to enable the nation to participate in the 1936 Winter and Summer Games and Winter Olympic Games in Germany in the year 1936. Eduard von Falz-Fein founded the Liechtenstein Olympic Committee in 1935 to ensure the country was represented at the Olympic Games. The nation made since made appearance at three Winter Games. The 1960 edition of the Games marked the nation's fourth appearance at the Winter Games.

The 1960 Winter Olympics was held in Squaw Valley, United States between 18 and 28 February 1960. The Liechtenstein delegation consisted of three athletes competing in a single sport.

== Competitors ==
There were three athletes who took part in the medal events in alpine skiing.

Sport	Men	Women	Athletes
Alpine skiing	3	0	3
Total	3	0	3

== Alpine skiing ==
Alpine skiing at the 1960 Winter Olympics took place at Squaw Valley Ski Resort and consisted of three events for each gender. Liechtenstein entered three competitors across three events. Adolf Fehr, Hermann Kindle and Silvan Kindle represented the country in the events. This was Hermann's second Olympic Games after his debut in the 1956 Games. Fehr and Silvan competed in their first Winter Games.

In the Men's downhill event, the 3,095 m (10,154 ft) long course started at an altitude of 2,707 m (8,881 ft) and dropped by 758 m (2,487 ft) towards the finish. Fehr recorded the best place finish of 41 amongst the 61 competitors. Hermann and Silvan recorded identical times to finish tied for 49th place. In the giant slalom event, Silvan was the best ranked finisher amongst the three in 39th place after he completed the 1,828 m (5,997 ft) course in a time of 2:08.9. In the giant slalom event, Fehr was disqualified while Silvan and Hermann finished 21st and 27th respectively.

Athlete	Event	Race 1		Race 2		Total	
Athlete	Event	Time	Rank	Time	Rank	Time	Rank
Adolf Fehr	Men's downhill	—				2:27.4	41
Hermann Kindle	Men's downhill	—				2:29.4	=49
Silvan Kindle	Men's downhill	—				2:29.4	=49
Adolf Fehr	Men's giant slalom	—				2:13.3	43
Hermann Kindle	Men's giant slalom	—				2:11.7	40
Silvan Kindle	Men's giant slalom	—				2:08.9	39
Adolf Fehr	Men's slalom	DSQ	–	–	–	DSQ	–
Hermann Kindle	Men's slalom	1:28.7	46	1:17.0	26	2:45.7	27
Silvan Kindle	Men's slalom	1:19.3	28	1:11.4	21	2:30.7	21
