= Jürgen Berginz =

Liechtenstein bobsledder (born 1989)

Jürgen Berginz (born in Mauren on 30 June 1989) is a Liechtensteiner bobsledder. He competed for Liechtenstein at the 2010 Winter Olympics in the four-man event.
