= Philipp Haelg =

Liechtenstein cross-country skier (born 1991)

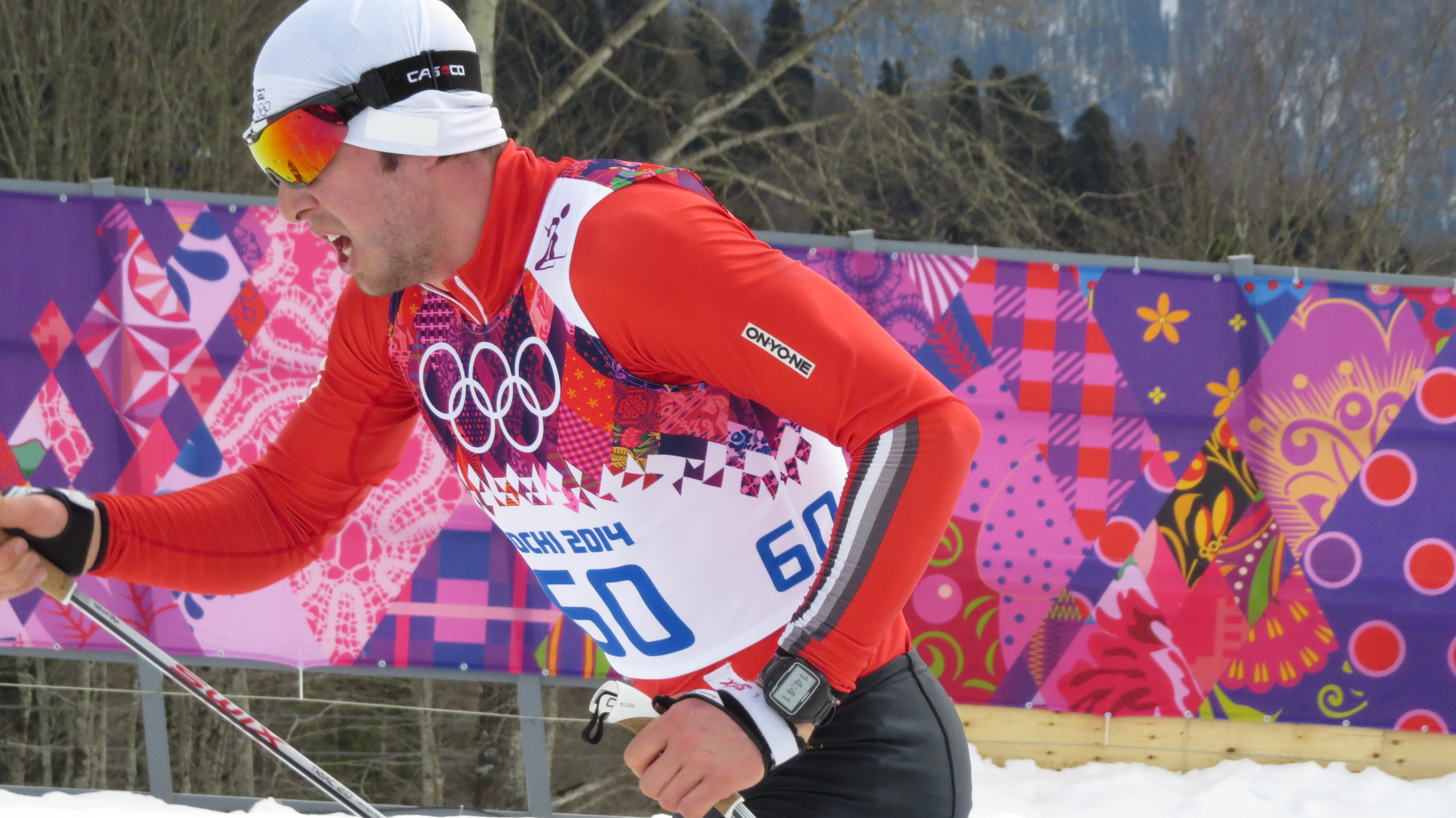

Personal information
- Born: 3 November 1991 (age 34)
Medal record
Cross-country skiing
Representing Liechtenstein

Philipp Haelg (born 3 November 1991) is a Liechtensteiner cross-country skier from Liechtenstein. He competed for Liechtenstein at the 2014 Winter Olympics in the 15 kilometre classical and 30 kilometre skiathlon races.

He announced his retirement from competitive skiing in March 2017.

== See also ==
- Liechtenstein at the 2014 Winter Olympics
