= Liechtenstein at the 2026 Winter Olympics =

- Flag of Liechtenstein
- IOC code: LIE
- NOC: Liechtenstein Olympic Committee
- Website: www.olympic.li/en

in Milan and Cortina d'Ampezzo, Italy 6 February 2026 – 22 February 2026
- Competitors: 7 (6 men and 1 woman) in 3 sports
- Flag bearer (opening): Martin Kranz
- Flag bearer (closing): Volunteer
- Medals: Gold 0 Silver 0 Bronze 0 Total 0

Winter Olympics appearances (overview)
- 1936; 1948; 1952; 1956; 1960; 1964; 1968; 1972; 1976; 1980; 1984; 1988; 1992; 1994; 1998; 2002; 2006; 2010; 2014; 2018; 2022; 2026

Liechtenstein competed at the 2026 Winter Olympics in Milan and Cortina d'Ampezzo, Italy, from 6 to 22 February 2026.

The Liechtenstein team consisted of seven athletes competing in three sports. Bobsledder Martin Kranz was the country's flagbearer during the opening ceremony. Meanwhile, a volunteer was the country's flagbearer during the closing ceremony.

== Competitors ==
The following is the list of number of competitors participating at the Games per sport/discipline.

Sport	Men	Women	Total
Alpine skiing	1	1	2
Bobsleigh	4	0	4
Cross-country skiing	1	0	1
Total	6	1	7

== Alpine skiing ==
Liechtenstein qualified one male and one female alpine skier through the basic quota.

Athlete	Event	Run 1		Run 2		Total	
Athlete	Event	Time	Rank	Time	Rank	Time	Rank
Marco Pfiffner	Men's downhill	—N/a				1:55.66	29
Marco Pfiffner	Men's super-G	—N/a				DNF	
Madeleine Beck	Women's giant slalom	1:07.08	37	1:13.87	34	2:20.95	33
Madeleine Beck	Women's slalom	51.23	40	55.42	31	1:46.65	32

== Bobsleigh ==
Liechtenstein qualified four male bobsledders.

Athlete	Event	Run 1		Run 2		Run 3		Run 4		Total	
Athlete	Event	Time	Rank	Time	Rank	Time	Rank	Time	Rank	Time	Rank
Martin Kranz*; David Tschofen	Two-man	56.31	20	56.29	19	56.09	20	56.24	18	3:44.93	20
Martin Kranz*; Mauro Bühler; Lorenz Lenherr; David Tschofen	Four-man	55.08	19	55.38	21	55.56	22	Did not advance		2:46.02	21

== Cross-country skiing ==
Liechtenstein qualified one male and one female cross-country skier through the basic quota.

Distance

Athlete	Event	Final		
Athlete	Event	Time	Deficit	Rank
Robin Frommelt	Men's 10 km freestyle	26:08.1	+5:31.9	91

Sprint

Athlete	Event	Qualification		Quarterfinal		Semifinal		Final	
Athlete	Event	Time	Rank	Time	Rank	Time	Rank	Time	Rank
Robin Frommelt	Men's sprint	3:36.60	71	Did not advance					
