= Liechtenstein at the 1936 Winter Olympics =

- IOC code: LIE
- NOC: Liechtenstein Olympic Committee
- Website: www.olympic.li (in German and English)

in Garmisch-Partenkirchen
- Competitors: 4 (men) in 2 sports
- Medals: Gold 0 Silver 0 Bronze 0 Total 0

Winter Olympics appearances (overview)
- 1936; 1948; 1952; 1956; 1960; 1964; 1968; 1972; 1976; 1980; 1984; 1988; 1992; 1994; 1998; 2002; 2006; 2010; 2014; 2018; 2022; 2026

Liechtenstein competed at the Winter Olympic Games for the first time at the 1936 Winter Olympics in Garmisch-Partenkirchen, Germany.

== Alpine skiing ==
Men

Athlete	Event	Downhill		Slalom			Total	
Athlete	Event	Time	Rank	Time 1	Time 2	Rank	Total points	Rank
Franz Schädler	Combined	11:59.8	54	2:32.5	DSQ	–	DNF	–
Hubert Negele	Combined	8:09.4	51	2:16.1	DSQ	–	DNF	–

== Bobsleigh ==
Sled	Athletes	Event	Run 1		Run 2		Run 3		Run 4		Total	
Sled	Athletes	Event	Time	Rank	Time	Rank	Time	Rank	Time	Rank	Time	Rank
LIE-1	Eduard Theodor von Falz-Fein; Eugen Büchel	Two-man	1:30.96	13	1:26.91	15	1:35.27	21	1:28.80	18	6:01.94	18
