= Liechtenstein at the 2022 Winter Olympics =

- Flag of Liechtenstein
- IOC code: LIE
- NOC: Liechtenstein Olympic Committee
- Website: www.olympic.li/en

in Beijing, China 4–20 February 2022
- Competitors: 2 (1 man and 1 woman) in 2 sports
- Flag bearer (opening): Stefan Marxer
- Flag bearer (closing): Volunteer
- Medals: Gold 0 Silver 0 Bronze 0 Total 0

Winter Olympics appearances (overview)
- 1936; 1948; 1952; 1956; 1960; 1964; 1968; 1972; 1976; 1980; 1984; 1988; 1992; 1994; 1998; 2002; 2006; 2010; 2014; 2018; 2022; 2026

Liechtenstein competed at the 2022 Winter Olympics in Beijing, China. The 2022 Winter Olympics were held from 4 to 20 February 2022.

The team from Liechtenstein consisted of two athletes (one per gender) competing in alpine skiing. The president of the Liechtenstein Olympic Committee, Stefan Marxer served as the country's flagbearer during the opening ceremony, since both athletes were focused on their respective events. Meanwhile a volunteer was the flagbearer during the closing ceremony.

== Competitors ==
The following is the list of number of competitors participating at the Games per sport/discipline.

Sport	Men	Women	Total
Alpine skiing	1	0	1
Cross-country skiing	0	1	1
Total	1	1	2

== Alpine skiing ==
Liechtenstein qualified one male and two female alpine skiers, but declined both female quotas.

Athlete	Event	Run 1		Run 2		Total	
Athlete	Event	Time	Rank	Time	Rank	Time	Rank
Marco Pfiffner	Men's combined	1:45.11	13	51.29	9	2:36.40	11
Marco Pfiffner	Men's downhill	—N/a				1:45:79	28
Marco Pfiffner	Men's super-G	—N/a				1:23:66	28

== Cross-country skiing ==
By meeting the basic qualification standards Liechtenstein qualified one female cross-country skier.

Distance

Athlete	Event	Classical		Freestyle		Final		
Athlete	Event	Time	Rank	Time	Rank	Time	Deficit	Rank
Nina Riedener	Women's 10 km classical	—N/a				33:49.0	+5:42.7	69
Nina Riedener	Women's 15 km skiathlon	27:02.0	54	25:15.9	57	52:55.1	+8:41.4	57
