= Marina Nigg =

Liechtenstein alpine skier (born 1984)

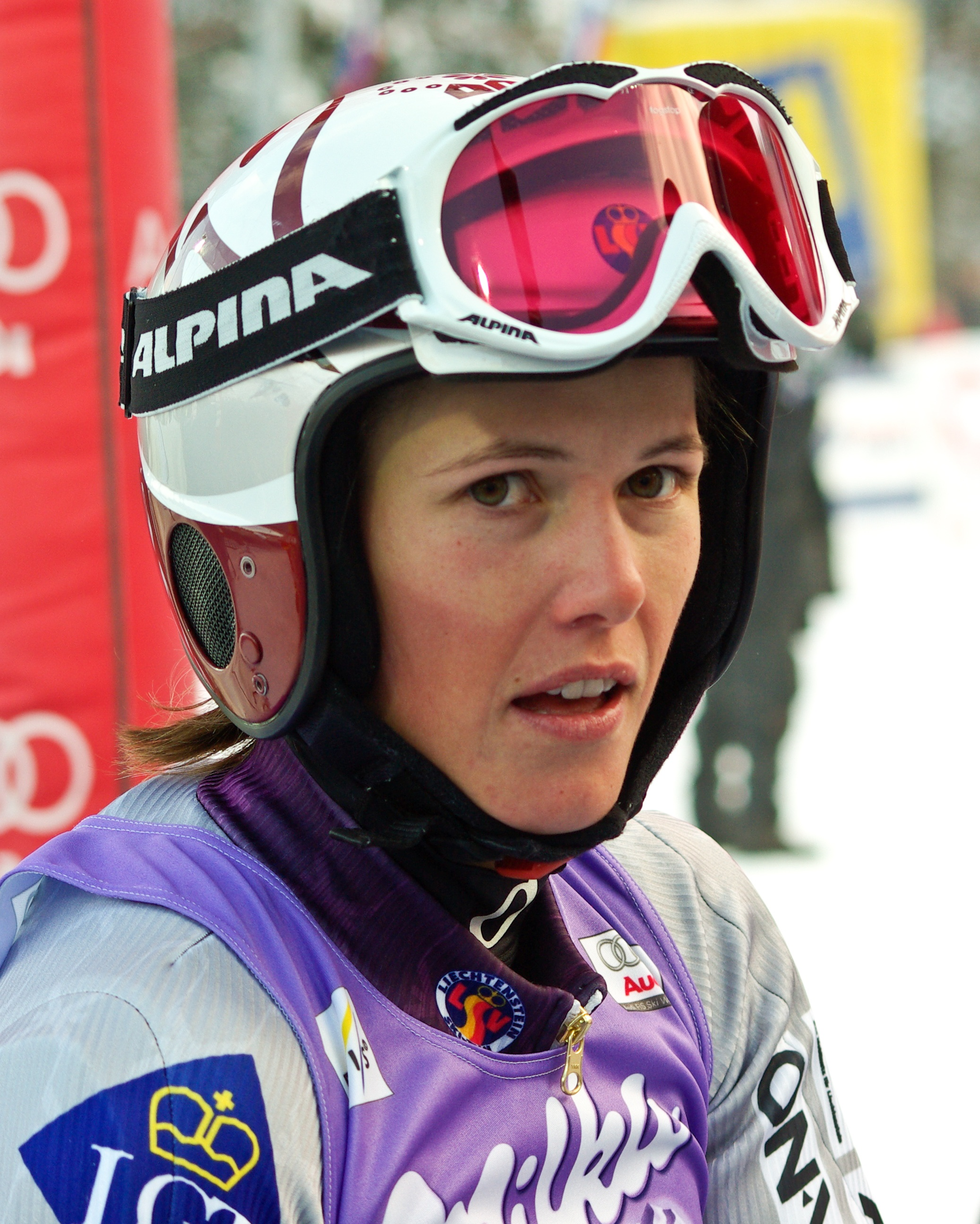

Personal information
- Born: 24 April 1984 (age 42) Vaduz, Liechtenstein
- Height: 5 ft 5 in (165 cm)
- Website: MarinaNigg.li

Skiing career
- Sport: Alpine skiing
- Club: Gamprin
- Disciplines: Giant slalom, slalom
- World Cup debut: October 25, 2003

Olympics
- Teams: 1
- Medals: 0 (0 gold)

World Championships
- Teams: 3
- Medals: 0 (0 gold)

World Cup
- Seasons: 5
- Wins: 0
- Podiums: 0
- Overall titles: 0
- Discipline titles: 0

Marina Nigg (born in Vaduz on 24 April 1984) is a Liechtensteiner alpine skier who represented Liechtenstein at the 2010 Winter Olympics. Nigg specializes in the slalom and giant slalom events, and finished 22nd in the slalom at the 2010 Winter Olympics.
