= Max Beck (luger) =

Liechtenstein luger (born 1952)

Personal information
- Nationality: Liechtenstein
- Born: 13 January 1952 (age 73)

Sport
- Sport: Luge

Max Beck (born 13 January 1952) is a Liechtensteiner luger. He competed in the men's singles and doubles events at the 1976 Winter Olympics.
