= Xaver Frick =

Liechtenstein sportsman (1913–2009)

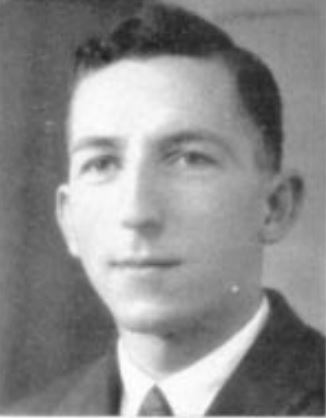
Frick before 1937

Xaver Frick (22 February 1913 – 10 June 2009) was a Liechtensteiner Olympic track and field athlete and cross-country skier.

== Life ==
He was born in Balzers, Liechtenstein. He competed in track sprinting events in the 1936 Summer Olympics in Berlin and cross-country skiing at the 1948 Winter Olympics in St. Moritz. Frick is the only Liechtenstein athlete to date to have competed in both the Summer and Winter Olympic Games.

Frick was a founding member of both the National Sports Association and the first Liechtenstein National Olympic Committee (NOC). He served as the Secretary of the National Olympic Committee beginning at its founding in 1935. He later headed the country's NOC as President from 1963 until 1970.

Frick served as the first president of the Liechtenstein Athletics Federation, also known as the Liechtensteiner Turn- und Leichtathletikverband, a European Athletics Member Federation, for 35 years. Additionally, Frick served on the board of directors of several other Liechtenstein organizations including the Alpine Club, the Gymnastics Club, and the Balzers Ski Club.

He was awarded a Golden Laurel in 2003 by the government of Liechtenstein for outstanding contributions to sport.

Frick died on 10 June 2009 at the age of 96.

== See also ==
- Liechtenstein at the Olympics
