= Hubert Hilti =

Liechtenstein alpine skier (born 1963)

Hubert Hilti (born 5 December 1963) is a Liechtensteiner former alpine skier who competed in the 1984 Winter Olympics.
