= Jessica Walter (skier) =

Liechtenstein alpine skier (born 1984)

Personal information
- Born: Vaduz, Liechtenstein
- Height: 1.62 m (5 ft 4 in)

Skiing career
- Sport: Alpine skiing
- Club: Skiclub Schaan
- Disciplines: Slalom; Giant slalom

Olympics
- Teams: 2006 Liechtenstein

World Cup
- Seasons: 2
Medal record
Alpine skiing
Representing Liechtenstein
Junior World Championships
Silver medal – second place	2004 Maribor	Giant slalom

Jessica Walter (born 14 October 1984) is a Liechtensteiner former alpine skier who competed in the 2006 Winter Olympics.

== Career ==
Walter was born in Vaduz and represented the Skiclub Schaan. Walter won silver at the World Junior Alpine Skiing Championships 2004 in Maribor, representing her country in the giant slalom. Between 2002 and 2006, she competed in 17 FIS Alpine Ski World Cup events, qualifying for three second run races for classification. Her best World Cup result came in February 2004 at Zwiesel in the slalom where she finished in 17th position.

She competed the 2006 Winter Olympics in Torino finishing 32nd in the slalom. She was also the chosen flagbearer of Liechtenstein for the opening ceremony.

== Personal life ==
Walter resides in Planken, Liechtenstein. Her mother is Petra Wenzel who competed in Alpine skiing at the 1980 and 1984 Winter Olympics. Her cousin is olympic medal winning skier, Tina Weirather.
