= Christof Frommelt =

Liechtenstein cross-country skier (1918–1987)

Personal information
- Nationality: Liechtenstein
- Born: 29 June 1918
- Died: 16 March 1987 (aged 68)

Sport
- Sport: Cross-country skiing

Christof Frommelt (29 June 1918 – 16 March 1987) was a Liechtensteiner cross-country skier. He competed in the men's 18 kilometre event at the 1948 Winter Olympics. He was the father of the Alpine skiers Willi Frommelt and Paul Frommelt.
