= Michael Riegler =

Liechtenstein alpine skier (born 1979)

Personal information
- Born: Grabs, Switzerland
- Height: 189 cm (6 ft 2 in)

Skiing career
- Sport: Alpine skiing
- Club: Skliclub Schaan
- Retired: 2005
- Disciplines: Slalom, Super G
- World Cup debut: 2002 Garmisch Partenkirchen

Olympics
- Teams: 2002 Salt Lake City

World Championships
- Teams: 2003 St Moritz; 2005 Bormio

World Cup
- Seasons: 2002, 2005

Michael Riegler (born 17 July 1979 in Grabs, Switzerland) is a Liechtensteiner former alpine skier. He competed in the 2002 Winter Olympics in Salt Lake City, finishing 35th in the giant slalom.

Riegler competed on the FIS Alpine Ski World Cup tour through 2002 to 2005. He also represented Liechtenstein at the 2003 and 2005 Alpine World Ski Championships in giant slalom and Super G. His most notable race win came at the 2004 National Championships in Innerkrems.
