= Hans-Walter Schädler =

Liechtenstein alpine skier (born 1945)

Johann (Hans) Walter Schädler (born 11 March 1945) is a Liechtensteiner former alpine skier who competed in the 1964 Winter Olympics and in the 1968 Winter Olympics.
