= Richard Wunder =

Liechtenstein bobsledder (born 1984)

Richard Wunderlich (born 30 September 1984) is a Liechtensteiner bobsledder. He competed for Liechtenstein at the 2010 Winter Olympics in the four-man event. Wunder was Liechtenstein's flag bearer during the 2010 Winter Olympics opening ceremony.
