= Hermann Kindle =

Liechtenstein alpine skier (1935–2025)

Hermann Anton Kindle (14 June 1935 – 18 September 2025) was a Liechtensteiner alpine skier who competed in the 1956 Winter Olympics and in the 1960 Winter Olympics.

Kindle died on 18 September 2025, at the age of 90.
