= Rainer Gassner =

Liechtenstein luger (born 1958)

Personal information
- Nationality: Liechtenstein
- Born: 31 July 1958 (age 66)

Sport
- Sport: Luge

Rainer Gassner (born 31 July 1958) is a Liechtensteiner luger. He competed at the 1976 Winter Olympics and the 1980 Winter Olympics.
