= Josef Gassner (skier) =

Liechtenstein alpine skier (born 1944)

Josef Gassner (born 19 December 1944) is a Liechtensteiner former alpine skier who competed in the 1964 Winter Olympics and in the 1968 Winter Olympics.
