= Thomas Dürr (bobsledder) =

Liechtenstein bobsledder (born 1978)

Personal information
- National team: Liechtenstein
- Born: July 12, 1978 (age 46); Grabs, Switzerland
- Years active: 2006-2013
- Height: 1.94 m (6 ft 4 in)
- Weight: 102 kg (225 lb)

Sport
- Country: Liechtenstein
- Sport: Bobsleigh

Achievements and titles
- Olympic finals: 2010 Winter Olympics
- World finals: St Moritz 2013

Thomas Dürr (born 12 July 1978) is a Liechtensteiner bobsledder who has competed since 2006. At the 2010 Winter Olympics in Vancouver, he crashed out in the two-man event, on a run that also saw crashes for Great Britain, Australia and Canada. He withdrew from the four-man event.

Dürr's best overall finish was sixth at the 2009 North American Cup, Park City, Utah in the four man event.
