= Marta Bühler =

Liechtenstein alpine skier (born 1951)

Marta Bühler (born 6 February 1951) is a Liechtensteiner former alpine skier who competed in the 1968 Winter Olympics and in the 1972 Winter Olympics. She was the first woman to represent Liechtenstein at the Olympics.
