= Daniel Vogt (skier) =

Liechtenstein alpine skier (born 1972)

Daniel Vogt (born 19 March 1972 in Balzers) is a Liechtensteiner former alpine skier who competed in the 1992 Winter Olympics and 1994 Winter Olympics.
