= Johann Schädler (luger) =

Liechtenstein luger (born 1939)

Personal information
- Nationality: Liechtenstein
- Born: 8 June 1939 (age 86)

Sport
- Sport: Luge

Johann Schädler (born 8 June 1939) is a Liechtensteiner luger. He competed in the men's singles event at the 1964 Winter Olympics.
