= Werner Sele =

Liechtenstein luger (born 1951)

Personal information
- Born: 24 June 1951 (age 73); Triesenberg, Liechtenstein

Sport
- Sport: Luge

Werner Sele (born 24 June 1951) is a Liechtensteiner luger. He competed at the 1968 Winter Olympics and the 1972 Winter Olympics.
