= Marco Pfiffner =

Swiss-born Liechtenstein alpine skier

Personal information
- Born: 25 March 1994 (age 32) Walenstadt, St. Gallen, Switzerland
- Height: 1.91 m (6 ft 3 in)

Skiing career
- Country: Liechtenstein
- Sport: Alpine skiing
- Club: Unterland Winter Sports (UWV)
- Disciplines: Combined, downhill, giant slalom, slalom and Super-G
- World Cup debut: 24 January 2016 (age 21)

Olympics
- Teams: 4 – (2014–2026)
- Medals: 0

World Championships
- Teams: 6 – (2011–2013, 2017, 2021–2025)
- Medals: 0

World Cup
- Seasons: 10 – (2016–2018, 2020–2026)
- Wins: 0
- Podiums: 0
- Overall titles: 0 – (149th in 2025)
- Discipline titles: 0 – (44th in AC, 2020)

Marco Pfiffner (born 25 March 1994) is a Swiss-born World Cup alpine ski racer who represents Liechtenstein and has competed at four Winter Olympics (2014, 2018, 2022, 2026) and six World Championships.

== Early life ==
Born in Walenstadt in the Swiss canton of St. Gallen, Pfiffner lives in Mauren, Liechtenstein, and represents the Unterland Winter Sports Club (UWV).

== Career ==
Pfiffner began competing in FIS races at age fifteen. In 2011, he participated in the Junior World Championships in Crans Montana, Switzerland, securing 43rd and 54th place finishes in slalom and giant slalom. Weeks later, he took part in the World Championships at Garmisch Partenkirchen, Germany, where he finished 72nd in giant slalom and 53rd in slalom. He also competed in the 2013 World Championships in Schladming, Austria.

Pfiffner was part of the Liechtenstein Olympic Team at the 2014 Winter Olympics in Sochi, Russia. He scored a best finish of 24th place in the slalom.

On 24 January 2016, he made his World Cup debut in a slalom at Kitzbühel, Austria. His early World Cup races were in the slalom and giant slalom disciplines.

In 2017, Pfiffner raced in all disciplines at the World Championships in St. Moritz, Switzerland. Securing 36th in the super-G, 42nd in the downhill, and 34th in the combined event. His best result was 26th in the slalom. In January 2018, he won the European Cup combined event in Saalbach-Hinterglemm.

Pfiffner was the designed flag bearer for his second Olympic Games, in PyeongChang. He competed in four races and secured a best result of 25th place in the slalom.

In January 2020, Pfiffner scored his first FIS World Cup points with 29th place in the Labuerhorn combination event in Wengen. He took part in the 2021 World Championships in Cortina d'Ampezzo.

Pfiffner was once again part of the Liechtenstein Olympic Team for the 2022 Winter Olympics in Beijing, China. He finished 28th in both the downhill and super-G disciplines, and a career-high 11th place in the combined.

Pfiffner made his fourth Olympic appearance for Liechtenstein at the 2026 Winter Olympics, with men's alpine events held in Bormio, Italy.

== Endorsements ==
Pfiffner is sponsored by the bank, LGT. He also utilises Salomon and Leki equipment.

== World Cup results ==
=== Season standings ===
Season
Season	Age	Overall	Slalom	Giant slalom	Super-G	Downhill	Combined
2020	25	161	—	—	—	—	44
2023	28	156	—	—	—	60	—N/a
2025	30	149	—	—	—	58	—N/a

== World Championship results ==
Year
Year	Age	Slalom	Giant slalom	Super-G	Downhill	Combined	Team combined	Parallel
2011	16	53	72	—	—	—	—N/a	—N/a
2013	18	34	71	—	—	—	—N/a	—N/a
2017	22	26	—	36	42	34	—N/a	—N/a
2021	26	—	—	30	27	DNF1	—N/a	—
2023	28	—	—	35	33	14	—N/a	—
2025	30	—	—	33	26	—N/a	—	—N/a

== Olympic results ==
Year
Year	Age	Slalom	Giant slalom	Super-G	Downhill	Combined	Team combined
2014	19	24	42	—	—	—	—N/a
2018	23	25	—	36	43	DNF2	—N/a
2022	27	—	—	28	28	11	—N/a
2026	31	—	—	DNF	29	—N/a	—
