= Stephan Kunz =

Liechtenstein cross-country skier (born 1972)

Personal information
- Born: 31 January 1972 (age 53); Vaduz, Liechtenstein

Sport
- Sport: Cross-country skiing

Stephan Kunz (born 31 January 1972) is a Liechtensteiner cross-country skier. He competed at the 1994 Winter Olympics, the 1998 Winter Olympics and the 2002 Winter Olympics.
