= Markus Foser =

Liechtenstein alpine skier (born 1968)

Personal information
- Born: 31 January 1968 (age 58) Vaduz, Liechtenstein

Skiing career
- Sport: Alpine skiing
- Retired: 1997
- Disciplines: Speed events
- World Cup debut: 1992

Olympics
- Teams: 2

World Championships
- Teams: 2

World Cup
- Seasons: 6
- Wins: 1
- Podiums: 1

Markus Foser (born 31 January 1968) is a Liechtensteiner former alpine skier who competed in the 1992 Winter Olympics and 1994 Winter Olympics.

== Career ==
Foser is most notable for his sole win on the Alpine skiing World Cup, achieved in the Val Gardena downhill in December 1993 from a bib number of 66 in changing conditions. This was the first World Cup downhill win for a male skier from Liechtenstein. He scored two more top ten finishes on the World Cup, both in downhill - a seventh place in Aspen, Colorado in March 1994 and a fourth in the 1995 edition of the Val Gardena downhill.
