= Wolfgang Schädler =

Liechtenstein luger (born 1958)

Personal information
- Nationality: Liechtenstein
- Born: 8 July 1958 (age 66)

Sport
- Sport: Luge

Wolfgang Schädler (born 8 July 1958) is a Liechtensteiner luger. He competed at the 1976 Winter Olympics, the 1980 Winter Olympics and the 1984 Winter Olympics.
