= Tamara Schädler =

Liechtenstein alpine skier (born 1977)

Tamara Schädler (born 23 April 1977 in Chur, Switzerland) is a Liechtensteiner former alpine skier who competed in the 1998 Winter Olympics.
