= Eduard Theodor von Falz-Fein =

Liechtenstein bobsledder (1912–1974)

Personal information
- Nationality: Liechtensteiner
- Born: 4 June 1912 Askania-Nova, Russian Empire
- Died: 17 June 1974 (aged 62) West-Berlin, West Germany

Sport
- Sport: Bobsleigh

Eduard Theodor von Falz-Fein (4 June 1912 – 17 June 1974) was a Liechtensteiner bobsledder who competed in the 1936 Winter Olympic Games, in the two man bobsleigh, also as Liechtenstein's attaché at the 1936 Summer Olympics. He was a cousin of Eduard Oleg Alexandrowitsch von Falz-Fein, who was also born in 1912.

== See also ==
- Liechtenstein at the 1936 Summer Olympics
- Liechtenstein at the 1936 Winter Olympics
