= Jürgen Hasler =

Liechtenstein alpine skier (born 1973)

Jürgen Hasler (born 7 May 1973) is a Liechtensteiner former alpine skier who competed in the 1994 Winter Olympics, 1998 Winter Olympics and 2002 Winter Olympics.
