= Günther Marxer =

Liechtenstein alpine skier (born 1964)

Günther Marxer (born 3 June 1964) is a Liechtensteiner former alpine skier who competed in the 1984 Winter Olympics, 1988 Winter Olympics, and 1992 Winter Olympics.
