= Achim Vogt =

Liechtenstein politician and former alpine skier (born 1970)

Achim Vogt (born 7 December 1970) is a politician and former alpine skier from Liechtenstein who has served in the Landtag of Liechtenstein since 2025.

Vogt competed in the 1992 Winter Olympics, 1994 Winter Olympics, 1998 Winter Olympics, and 2002 Winter Olympics. He scored one win on the alpine skiing World Cup, in a giant slalom race in Tignes in December 1994.
