= Ursula Konzett =

Liechtenstein alpine skier (born 1959)

Medal record

Representing Liechtenstein

Women's Alpine skiing

Olympic games
Bronze medal – third place	1984 Sarajevo	Slalom

World Championships
Bronze medal – third place	1982 Schladming	Giant Slalom

Ursula Gregg (née Konzett; born 15 November 1959 in Grabs, Switzerland) is a Liechtensteiner former Alpine skier.

== Career ==
=== Olympic Games ===
- Alpine skiing at the 1984 Winter Olympics (in Sarajevo, Yugoslavia).
  - Bronze medal in slalom

=== World Championships ===
- 1982 (in Schladming, Austria).
  - Bronze medal in giant slalom

=== World Cup ===
- 6th overall in the 1982 Alpine Skiing World Cup

2nd slalom overall

=== Per season ===
- World Cup 1982
- Slalom : 2 victories (in Lenggries, Germany and in Waterville Valley, New Hampshire, USA).

Olympic Games
Preceded by Eduard von Falz-Fein	Flagbearer for Liechtenstein; Innsbruck 1976	Succeeded by Petra Wenzel
