= Birgit Heeb-Batliner =

Liechtenstein alpine skier (born 1972)

Birgit Heeb-Batliner (born 14 October 1972) is a Liechtensteiner former alpine skier who competed in the 1992 Winter Olympics, 1994 Winter Olympics, 1998 Winter Olympics, and 2002 Winter Olympics. She scored one alpine skiing World Cup win in her career, in a giant slalom race in Park City, Utah in November 2002.
