= Marco Büchel =

Liechtenstein alpine skier

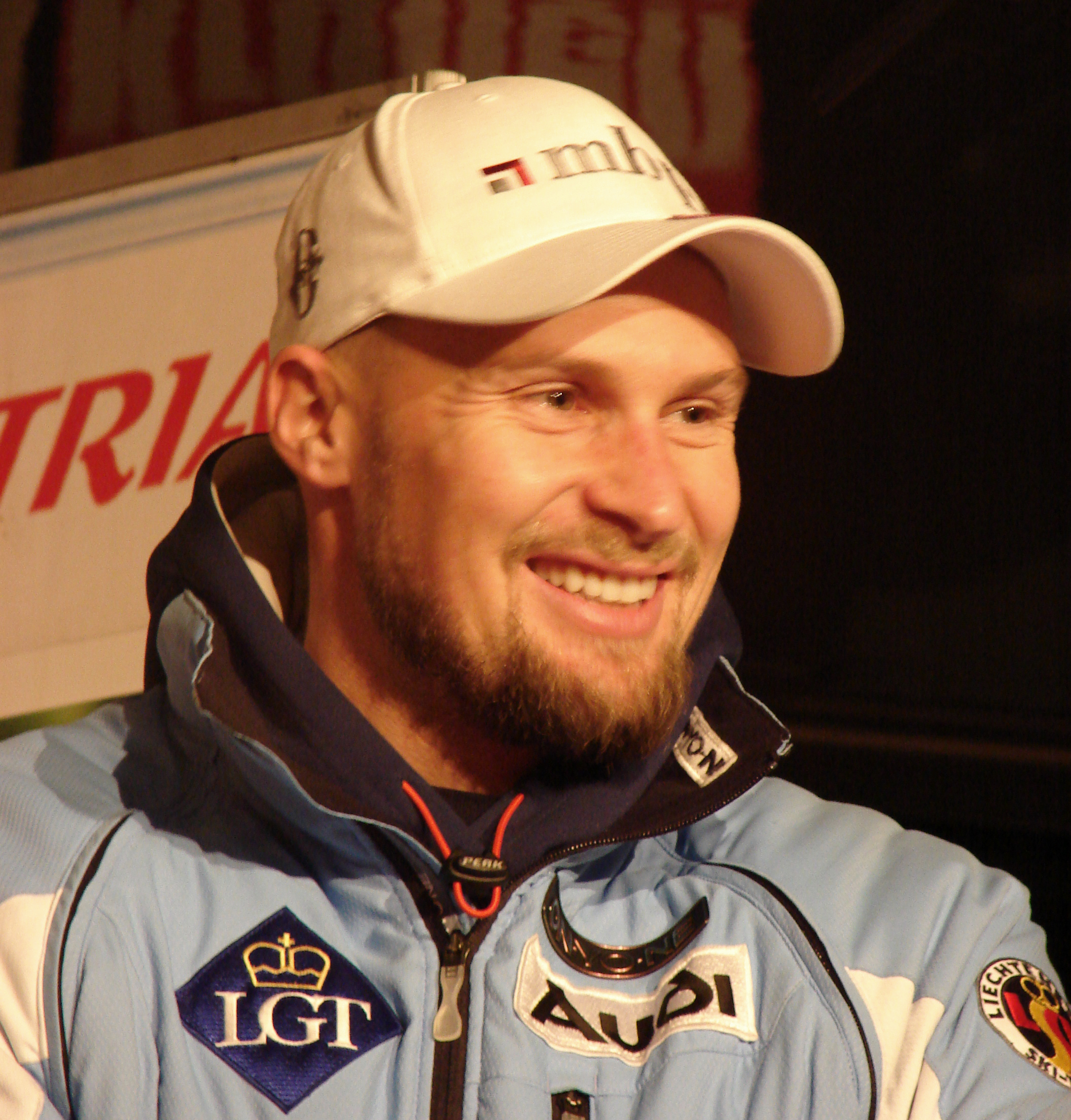

Medal record

Representing Liechtenstein

Men's Alpine skiing

World Championships
Silver medal – second place	1999 Vail	Giant slalom

Marco Büchel (born 4 November 1971) is a Liechtensteiner retired alpine ski racer. He participated in a record-tying six Winter Olympics, starting in 1992 and ending in 2010.

== Life ==
Büchel was born in Walenstadt, Switzerland, is from and attended school in Balzers. He has since lived in Triesenberg.

On 18 January 2008, Büchel won a World Cup Super-G race at Kitzbühel, and set a then record as the oldest winner of a World Cup race at the age of 36 years, 75 days. This has since been surpassed by Didier Cuche, who won a downhill race at the same location on 22 January 2011 to set a new record as the oldest winner of a World Cup race; the following 13 months Cuche extended this record 6 times, finally with his last career victory in the Super-G of Crans Montana on 24 February 2012 to 37 years, 192 days.

Büchel is featured in the OL-floka music video for the 1994 Winter Olympics. He's seen climbing upwards in the combined slalom course, after missing a gate.

Büchel retired following the Super-G race at Garmisch-Partenkirchen (Germany) on 11 March 2010. He celebrated his last race by racing not in the regular catsuit, but by wearing a tuxedo with black Bermuda shorts. As he skied down the course, Büchel slowed down many times to "high-five" various trainers.

He had also appeared on The Amazing Race 18 as contestants had to give him the correct answer for calculating the Length of Liechtenstein. Since 2010, he has been a sports commentator at ZDF.

== Results ==
- World Cup
  - 2003: 2nd in Super-G
- World Championships
  - 1999: Silver Medal in giant slalom
- Swiss Championships
  - 1999/2000: Champion in Downhill, giant slalom, Combination
  - 2000/2001: Champion in Parallel slalom

=== World Cup victories ===
Date	Location	Race
23 February 2003	(Germany) Garmisch-Partenkirchen	Super-G
17 December 2005	(Italy) Val Gardena	Downhill
25 November 2006	(Canada) Lake Louise	Downhill
18 January 2008	(Austria) Kitzbühel	Super-G

Olympic Games
Preceded by Tamara Schädler	Flagbearer for Liechtenstein; Salt Lake City 2002	Succeeded by Jessica Walter
