= Tina Weirather =

Liechtenstein alpine skier

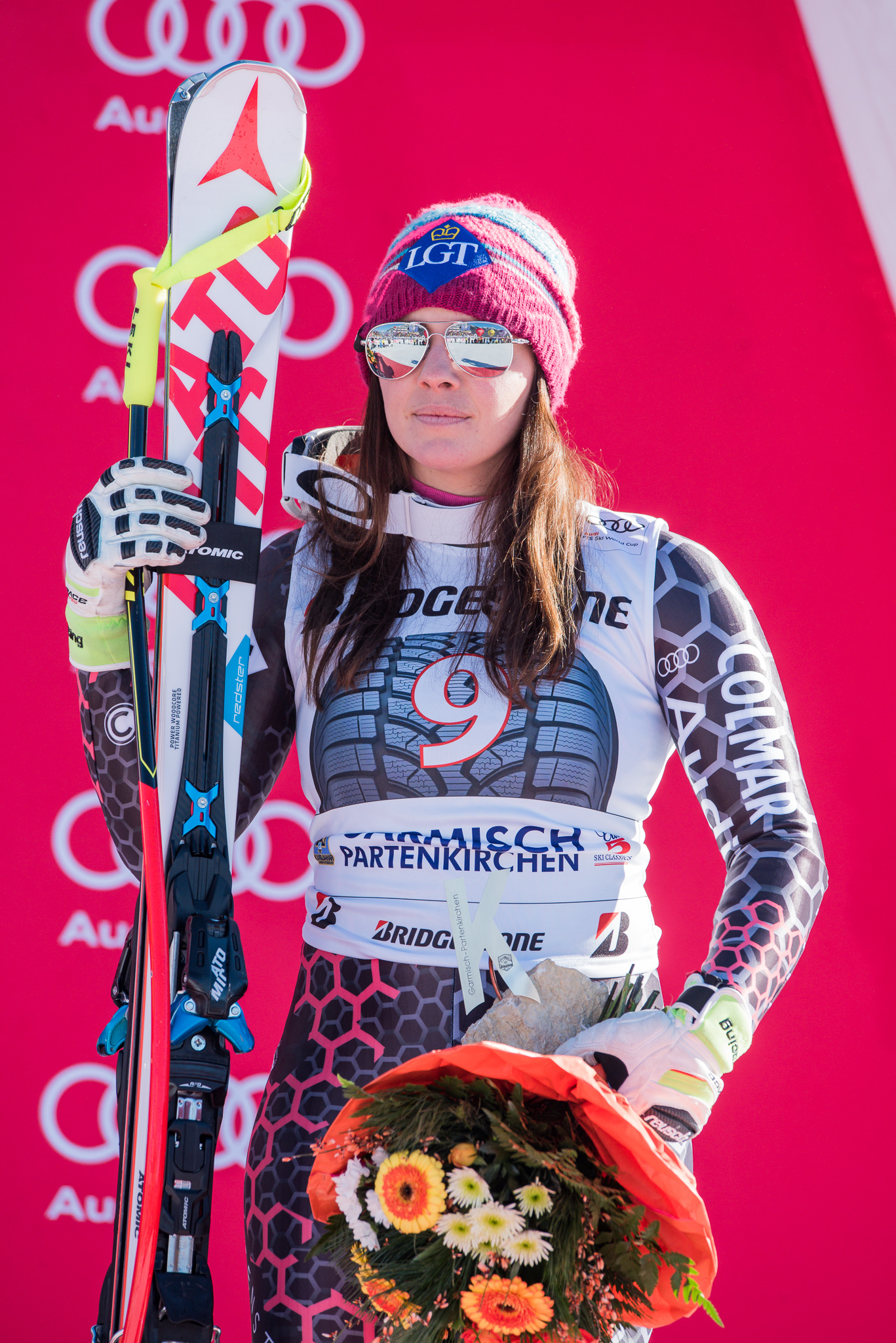
- Weirather in January 2017

Personal information
- Born: 24 May 1989 (age 37) Vaduz, Liechtenstein
- Height: 1.62 m (5 ft 4 in)
- Website: tina-weirather.com

Skiing career
- Sport: Alpine skiing
- Club: Ski Club Schaan
- Retired: 25 March 2020 (age 30)
- Disciplines: Super-G, downhill, giant slalom
- World Cup debut: 22 October 2005 (age 16)

Olympics
- Teams: 3 – (2006, 2014, 2018)
- Medals: 1 (0 gold)

World Championships
- Teams: 6 – (2005–07, 2013–19)
- Medals: 1 (0 gold)

World Cup
- Seasons: 13 – (2006–2008, 2010, 2012–2020)
- Wins: 9 – (1 DH, 7 SG, 1 GS)
- Podiums: 41 – (14 DH, 21 SG, 6 GS)
- Overall titles: 0 – (4th in 2016)
- Discipline titles: 2 – (2 SG, 2017, 2018)
Medal record
Women's alpine skiing
Representing Liechtenstein
International alpine ski competitions
Event	1st	2nd	3rd
Olympic Games	0	0	1
World Championships	0	1	0
Total	0	1	1
Olympic Games
Bronze medal – third place	2018 Pyeongchang	Super-G
World Championships
Silver medal – second place	2017 St. Moritz	Super-G
Junior World Championships
Gold medal – first place	2007 Altenmarkt	Downhill
Gold medal – first place	2006 Mont Sainte-Anne	Giant slalom
Silver medal – second place	2009 Garmisch-Partenkirchen	Giant slalom
Silver medal – second place	2007 Altenmarkt	Super-G
Silver medal – second place	2007 Altenmarkt	Giant slalom

Christina Weirather (born 24 May 1989) is a retired Liechtensteiner World Cup alpine ski racer. She won a bronze medal in Super-G for Liechtenstein at the 2018 Winter Olympics in Pyeongchang.

== Racing career ==
Weirather made her World Cup debut at age 16 in October 2005 and had nine victories and 41 podiums through her retirement in 2020, during the COVID-19 pandemic.

Weirather competed in two events at the 2006 Winter Olympics in Turin, Italy, and finished 33rd in the super-G, but did not finish in the downhill. She had qualified to ski in four events at the 2010 Winter Olympics: downhill, super-G, giant slalom, and the combined. Just weeks before the Olympics on 23 January, while competing in a World Cup downhill at Cortina d'Ampezzo, Weirather suffered another anterior cruciate ligament injury to her right knee and missed the Olympics, as well as the following World Cup season of 2011.

Following years of training alongside her compatriots on the Liechtenstein Alpine Ski team, Weirather switched to training with the Swiss team.

During the fourth training run for the downhill at the 2014 Winter Olympics, Weirather crashed at Rosa Khutor on 9 February and injured her lower right leg. The bone contusion caused her to miss her starts in the Olympics and the remainder of the 2014 World Cup season. At the time, she was second in the World Cup overall, downhill and super-G standings and third in the giant slalom.

On 25 March 2020 she announced her retirement.

== Personal life ==
Born in Vaduz, Weirather is the daughter of former World Cup ski racers Harti Weirather of Austria and Hanni Wenzel of Liechtenstein (and the niece of Andreas Wenzel). Her mother Hanni won two overall World Cup titles (1978, 1980) and two Olympic gold medals (1980), four Olympic medals overall; uncle Andreas won the men's overall World Cup title in 1980 and 2 Olympic medals. Her father Harti won the season title in downhill in 1981 and was world champion in 1982.

Weirather married Swiss radio host Fabio Nay in September 2022. The couple has two children: a son born in 2024 and a daughter born in 2026.

== World Cup results ==
=== Season titles ===
Season
Season	Discipline
2017	Super-G
2018	Super-G

=== Season standings ===
Season
Season	Age	Overall	Slalom	Giant; Slalom	Super-G	Downhill	Combined
2007	17	56	—	23	51	43	16
2008	18	109	—	39	—	—	—
2009	19	injured: out for season					
2010	20	58	—	41	25	38	32
2011	21	injured: out for season					
2012	22	9	—	30	7	2nd place, silver medalist(s)	33
2013	23	18	—	37	9	6	—
2014	24	5	—	10	3rd place, bronze medalist(s)	4	17
2015	25	10	—	10	8	7	—
2016	26	4	43	5	2nd place, silver medalist(s)	8	—
2017	27	7	—	13	1st place, gold medalist(s)	5	—
2018	28	6	—	31	1st place, gold medalist(s)	3rd place, bronze medalist(s)	—
2019	29	17	—	56	3rd place, bronze medalist(s)	15	—
2020	30	24	—	—	16	23	—

=== Race podiums ===
- 9 wins (1 DH, 7 SG, 1 GS)
- 41 podiums (14 DH, 21 SG, 6 GS)

Season
Season	Date	Location	Discipline	Place
2012	2 Dec 2011	Lake Louise, Canada	Downhill	2nd
2012	28 Jan 2012	St. Moritz, Switzerland	Downhill	3rd
2012	4 Feb 2012	Garmisch-Partenkirchen, Germany	Downhill	3rd
2012	5 Feb 2012	Garmisch-Partenkirchen, Germany	Super-G	3rd
2012	26 Feb 2012	Bansko, Bulgaria	Super-G	2nd
2013	30 Nov 2012	Lake Louise, Canada	Downhill	3rd
2013	1 Mar 2013	Garmisch-Partenkirchen, Germany	Super-G	1st
2014	29 Nov 2013	(United States) Beaver Creek, USA	Downhill	2nd
2014	1 Dec 2013	(United States) Beaver Creek, USA	Giant slalom	3rd
2014	7 Dec 2013	Lake Louise, Canada	Downhill	2nd
2014	8 Dec 2013	Lake Louise, Canada	Super-G	2nd
2014	14 Dec 2013	St. Moritz, Switzerland	Super-G	1st
2014	22 Dec 2013	Val-d'Isère, France	Giant slalom	1st
2014	24 Jan 2014	Cortina d'Ampezzo, Italy	Downhill	2nd
2014	25 Jan 2014	Cortina d'Ampezzo, Italy	Downhill	3rd
2014	26 Jan 2014	Cortina d'Ampezzo, Italy	Super-G	2nd
2015	5 Dec 2014	Lake Louise, Canada	Downhill	3rd
2015	19 Jan 2015	Cortina d'Ampezzo, Italy	Super-G	3rd
2015	21 Feb 2015	Maribor, Slovenia	Giant slalom	3rd
2015	7 Mar 2015	Garmisch-Partenkirchen, Germany	Downhill	1st
2016	24 Oct 2015	Sölden, Austria	Giant slalom	3rd
2016	28 Dec 2015	Lienz, Austria	Giant slalom	2nd
2016	24 Jan 2016	Cortina d'Ampezzo, Italy	Super-G	2nd
2016	30 Jan 2016	Maribor, Slovenia	Giant slalom	3rd
2016	21 Feb 2016	La Thuile, Italy	Super-G	1st
2016	17 Mar 2016	St. Moritz, Switzerland	Super-G	1st
2017	4 Dec 2016	Lake Louise, Canada	Super-G	2nd
2017	18 Dec 2016	Val-d'Isère, France	Super-G	2nd
2017	15 Jan 2017	Altenmarkt-Zauchensee, Austria	Downhill	2nd
2017	22 Jan 2017	Garmisch-Partenkirchen, Germany	Super-G	3rd
2017	16 Mar 2017	(United States) Aspen, USA	Super-G	1st
2018	1 Dec 2017	Lake Louise, Canada	Downhill	2nd
2018	3 Dec 2017	Lake Louise, Canada	Super-G	1st
2018	9 Dec 2017	St. Moritz, Switzerland	Super-G	3rd
2018	17 Dec 2017	Val-d'Isère, France	Super-G	2nd
2018	20 Jan 2018	Cortina d'Ampezzo, Italy	Downhill	2nd
2018	4 Feb 2018	Garmisch-Partenkirchen, Germany	Downhill	3rd
2018	3 Mar 2018	Crans-Montana, Switzerland	Super-G	1st
2019	8 Dec 2018	St. Moritz, Switzerland	Super-G	3rd
2019	19 Dec 2018	Val Gardena, Italy	Super-G	2nd
2019	20 Jan 2019	Cortina d'Ampezzo, Italy	Super-G	2nd

== World Championship results ==
Year
Year	Age	Slalom	Giant; Slalom	Super-G	Downhill	Combined
2005	15	—	—	31	—	—
2007	17	—	DNF2	DNF	—	DNS2
2009	19	injured, did not compete				
2011	21	injured, did not compete				
2013	23	—	27	DNF	13	DNS2
2015	25	—	4	6	11	—
2017	27	—	19	2	10	DNS1
2019	29	—	—	DNF	18	DNS2

== Olympic results ==
Year
Year	Age	Slalom	Giant; Slalom	Super-G	Downhill	Combined
2006	16	—	—	33	DNF	—
2010	20	injured: did not compete				
2014	24	—	—	DNS^	DNS^	—
2018	28	—	22	3	4	—

^ injured during downhill training run

== Other honours ==
=== Alpine skiing Junior World championships ===
- 2009 Alpine skiing Junior World Championships in Garmisch-Partenkirchen (Germany)
  - (silver) Giant slalom
- 2007 Alpine skiing Junior World Championships in Altenmarkt (Austria)
  - (gold) Downhill
  - (silver) Super-G
  - (silver) Giant slalom
- 2006 Alpine skiing Junior World Championships in Mont Sainte-Anne (Canada)
  - (gold) Giant slalom

=== Swiss Alpine skiing championships ===
- 2005 Swiss Alpine Skiing Championships in Veysonnaz (Switzerland)
  - (silver) Giant slalom
- 2006 Swiss Alpine Skiing Championships in St. Moritz (Switzerland)
  - (gold) Giant slalom
- 2009 Swiss Alpine Skiing Championships in St. Moritz (Switzerland)
  - (silver) Giant slalom

=== German Alpine skiing championships ===
- 2009 German Alpine Skiing Championships in Oberjoch (Germany)
  - (bronze) Giant slalom

=== Liechtenstein Alpine skiing championships ===
- 2006 Liechtenstein Alpine Skiing Championships in Malbun (Liechtenstein)
  - (gold) Giant slalom

== See also ==
- List of FIS Alpine Ski World Cup women's race winners
- List of Olympic medalist families

Olympic Games
Preceded by Richard Wunder	Flagbearer for Liechtenstein; Sochi 2014	Succeeded by Marco Pfiffner
