= Markus Hasler =

Liechtenstein cross-country skier (born 1971)

Markus Hasler (born 3 October 1971 in Eschen) is a Liechtensteiner cross-country skier who has competed since 1992. His best World Cup finish was third in a sprint event in Italy in 2001.

Hasler also competed in five Winter Olympics, earning his best finish of 11th in the 15 km + 15 km double pursuit event at Turin in 2006. His best finish at the FIS Nordic World Ski Championships was fourth in the 10 km + 10 km double pursuit event at Val di Fiemme in 2003.
