= Willi Frommelt =

Liechtenstein alpine skier

Personal information
- Born: 18 November 1952 (age 73) Schaan, Liechtenstein
- Height: 1.80 m (5 ft 11 in)

Skiing career
- Sport: Alpine skiing
- Club: Skiclub Schaan
- Retired: 1979
- Disciplines: Technical events
- World Cup debut: 1972

Olympics
- Teams: 2
- Medals: 1

World Championships
- Teams: 4
- Medals: 4

World Cup
- Seasons: 8
- Podiums: 1
Medal record
Men's alpine skiing
Representing Liechtenstein
World Cup race podiums
Event	1st	2nd	3rd
Slalom	0	0	1
International competitions
Event	1st	2nd	3rd
Olympic Games	0	0	1
World Championships	0	1	3
Total	0	1	4
Olympic Games
Bronze medal – third place	1976 Innsbruck	Slalom
World Championships
Silver medal – second place	1976 Innsbruck	Combined
Bronze medal – third place	1974 St. Moritz	Dohnhill
Bronze medal – third place	1976 Innsbruck	Slalom
Bronze medal – third place	1978 Garmisch	Giant slalom

Willi Frommelt (born 18 November 1952) is a former Alpine skier from Liechtenstein who won a bronze medal in the slalom at the 1976 Olympics.

During his career, Frommelt had only one podium finish in the World Cup events but four at the Alpine Ski World Championships and in four different disciplines.

== Biography ==
Frommelt is a son of Christof Frommelt, a cross-country skier and the Olympic flag bearer for Liechtenstein at the 1948 Games. At his first Olympics, in 1972, he competed in the downhill, slalom and giant slalom, but with little success. Two years later he won the first alpine skiing medal for Liechtenstein at world championships, a bronze in the downhill, and in 1978 he won another bronze, in the giant slalom. In 1976, he received a world championships silver for his combined results in the downhill, giant slalom and slalom at the 1976 Olympics – world championships were then combined with Olympics in the Olympic years, but the combined results did not count for the Olympics. He also became third in the slalom race (awarded with an Olympic bronze, and a bronze in the World Championships) - therefore he could gain four medals in four different disciplines. In the slalom (stated above) he was in lead after the first leg. - His capturing the bronze in the FIS Alpine Skiing World Championships 1974 was a great surprise, he did start with bib number 17.

After retiring from competitions Frommelt graduated in business management and worked as a financial planner for the National Bank of Liechtenstein. He was also active in politics with the centre-right Fortschrittliche Bürgerpartei and served a term as a municipal councillor.

His brother Paul won another Olympic bronze medal for Liechtenstein, in 1988. His other brother, Peter, was international table tennis competitor.
