= Andreas Wenzel =

Liechtenstein alpine skier (born 1958)

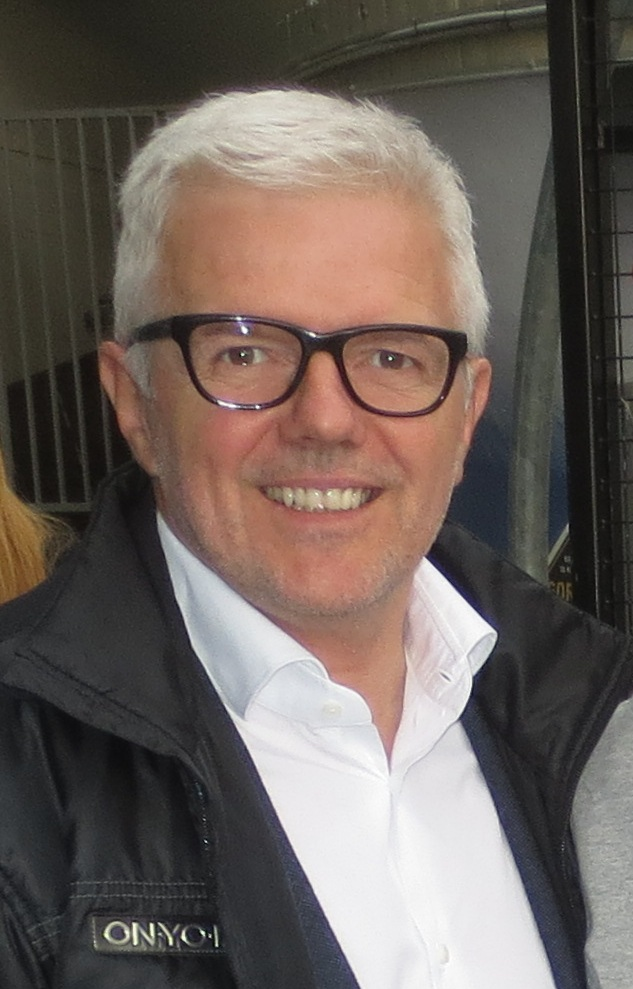
- Wenzel in April 2014

Personal information
- Born: 18 March 1958 (age 68) Planken, Liechtenstein
- Height: 180 cm (5 ft 11 in)

Skiing career
- Sport: Alpine skiing
- Retired: March 1988 – (age 30)
- Disciplines: Downhill, super-G, giant slalom, slalom, combined
- World Cup debut: 1976 – (age 17)

Olympics
- Teams: 4 – (1976–88)
- Medals: 2

World Championships
- Teams: 6 – (1976–87) includes two Olympics
- Medals: 4 (1 gold)

World Cup
- Seasons: 13
- Wins: 14
- Podiums: 48
- Overall titles: 1 – (1980)
- Discipline titles: 2 – (2 K, 1984, 1985)
Medal record
Men's alpine skiing
Representing Liechtenstein
World Cup race podiums
Event	1st	2nd	3rd
Slalom	4	4	4
Giant slalom	3	3	3
Super-G	1	1	1
Combined	6	13	5
Total	14	21	13
Olympic Games
Silver medal – second place	1980 Lake Placid	Giant slalom
Bronze medal – third place	1984 Sarajevo	Giant slalom
World Championships
Gold medal – first place	1978 Garmisch	Combined
Silver medal – second place	1978 Garmisch	Giant slalom
Silver medal – second place	1980 Lake Placid	Combined

Andreas Wenzel (born 18 March 1958) is a former World Cup alpine ski racer from Liechtenstein, active from 1976 to 1988. Born in Planken, he was the overall World Cup champion in 1980, the same season in which his older sister Hanni won the women's overall title. He also won two season titles in the combined event, in 1984 and 1985.

== Career ==
Wenzel competed in four Winter Olympics, and won two Olympic medals and four World Championship medals, including one gold (through 1980, the Olympics doubled as the World Championships). One of the top five-event racers of his era, he finished his World Cup career with 14 victories, 48 podiums, and 122 top ten finishes.

Up to the 2018 Winter Olympics, Liechtenstein has won ten medals in its history of competition in the Winter Olympics, with eight of these medals achieved by two sets of siblings – Andreas and his sister Hanni are responsible for six medals, while brothers Willi and Paul Frommelt are responsible for two more. His niece Tina Weirather won a bronze medal in Super-G for Liechtenstein at the 2018 Winter Olympics in PyeongChang.

== World Cup results ==
=== Season standings ===
Season	Age	Overall	Slalom	Giant slalom	Super G	Downhill	Combined
1977	18	21	16	11	not run	—	not awarded
1978	19	3	7	2	not run	—	not awarded
1979	20	6	15	7	not run	—	not awarded
1980	21	1	8	4	not run	13	2
1981	22	7	17	16	not run	33	2
1982	23	5	13	11	not run	—	2
1983	24	3	3	12	not awarded	30	5
1984	25	4	6	8	not awarded	37	1
1985	26	3	4	14	not awarded	35	1
1986	27	14	12	22	22	40	5
1987	28	19	28	19	13	—	2
1988	29	59	—	21	19	—	—

=== Season titles ===
3 titles – (1 overall, 2 combined)

Season	Discipline
1980	Overall
1984	Combined
1985	Combined

=== Individual races ===
14 wins: 1 super-G, 3 giant slalom, 4 slalom, 6 combined

Season	Date	Location	Race
1978	17 Jan 1978	Adelboden, Switzerland	Giant slalom
1978	6 Mar 1978	(United States) Waterville Valley, USA	Giant slalom
1980	12 Jan 1980	Lenggries, West Germany	Combined
1980	13 Jan 1980	Kitzbühel, Austria	Slalom
1980	8 Mar 1980	Oberstaufen, West Germany	Giant slalom
1981	4 Jan 1981	Ebnat-Kappel, Switzerland	Combined
1983	23 Feb 1983	Tärnaby, Sweden	Slalom
1984	1 Dec 1983	(Socialist Federal Republic of Yugoslavia) Kranjska Gora, Yugoslavia	Slalom
1984	20 Dec 1983	Madonna di Campiglio, Italy	Combined
1984	15 Jan 1984	Parpan, Switzerland	Combined
1984	29 Jan 1984	Garmisch, West Germany	Super-G
1985	16 Dec 1984	Madonna di Campiglio, Italy	Combined
1985	6 Jan 1985	La Mongie, France	Slalom
1985	13 Jan 1985	Kitzbühel, Austria	Combined

== See also ==
- List of Olympic medalist families
