= Paul Frommelt =

Liechtenstein alpine skier

Personal information
- Born: 9 August 1957 (age 68) Schaan, Liechtenstein

Skiing career
- Sport: Alpine skiing
- Retired: 1990
- Disciplines: Technical events
- World Cup debut: 1983

Olympics
- Teams: 4
- Medals: 1

World Championships
- Teams: 5
- Medals: 1

World Cup
- Seasons: 8
- Wins: 4
- Podiums: 25
Medal record
Men's alpine skiing
Representing Liechtenstein
World Cup race podiums
Event	1st	2nd	3rd
Slalom	4	8	13
International competitions
Event	1st	2nd	3rd
Olympic Games	0	0	1
World Championships	0	0	1
Junior World Championships	0	0	1
Total	0	0	3
Olympic Games
Bronze medal – third place	1988 Calgary	Slalom
World Championships
Bronze medal – third place	1978 Garmisch-Partenkirchen	Slalom

Paul Frommelt (born 9 August 1957) is a former Alpine skier from Liechtenstein and young brother of Willi Frommelt.

== Career ==
Frommelt was a member of the Liechtenstein ski team in the late 1970s and the 1980s, together with siblings Andreas Wenzel and Hanni Wenzel. He was a slalom specialist and won four World Cup races. He also came third at the 1978 World Championships in Garmisch-Partenkirchen. At the 1988 Winter Olympics in Calgary, he won a bronze medal in the slalom competition.

== World cup victories ==
Date	Location	Race
15 January 1979	(Switzerland) Crans-Montana	Slalom
13 January 1981	(West Germany) Oberstaufen	Slalom
19 January 1986	(Austria) Kitzbühel	Slalom
26 March 1988	(Austria) Saalbach	Slalom
