= Liechtenstein Olympic Committee =

National Olympic committee of Liechtenstein

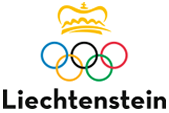
- Country: Liechtenstein
- [[|]]
- Code: LIE
- Created: 1935
- Recognized: 1935
- Continental Association: EOC
- Headquarters: Schaan, Liechtenstein
- President: Isabel Fehr
- Secretary General: Beat Wachter
- Website: www.olympic.li

The Liechtenstein Olympic Committee (German: Liechtensteinisches Olympisches Komitee; IOC Code: LIE) is the National Olympic Committee representing Liechtenstein. Before the organisation was renamed in 2013 it was called "Liechtensteinischer Olympischer Sportverband" (LOSV). They also organise Liechtenstein's participation in the Games of the Small States of Europe, hosting the 2011 Games of the Small States of Europe.

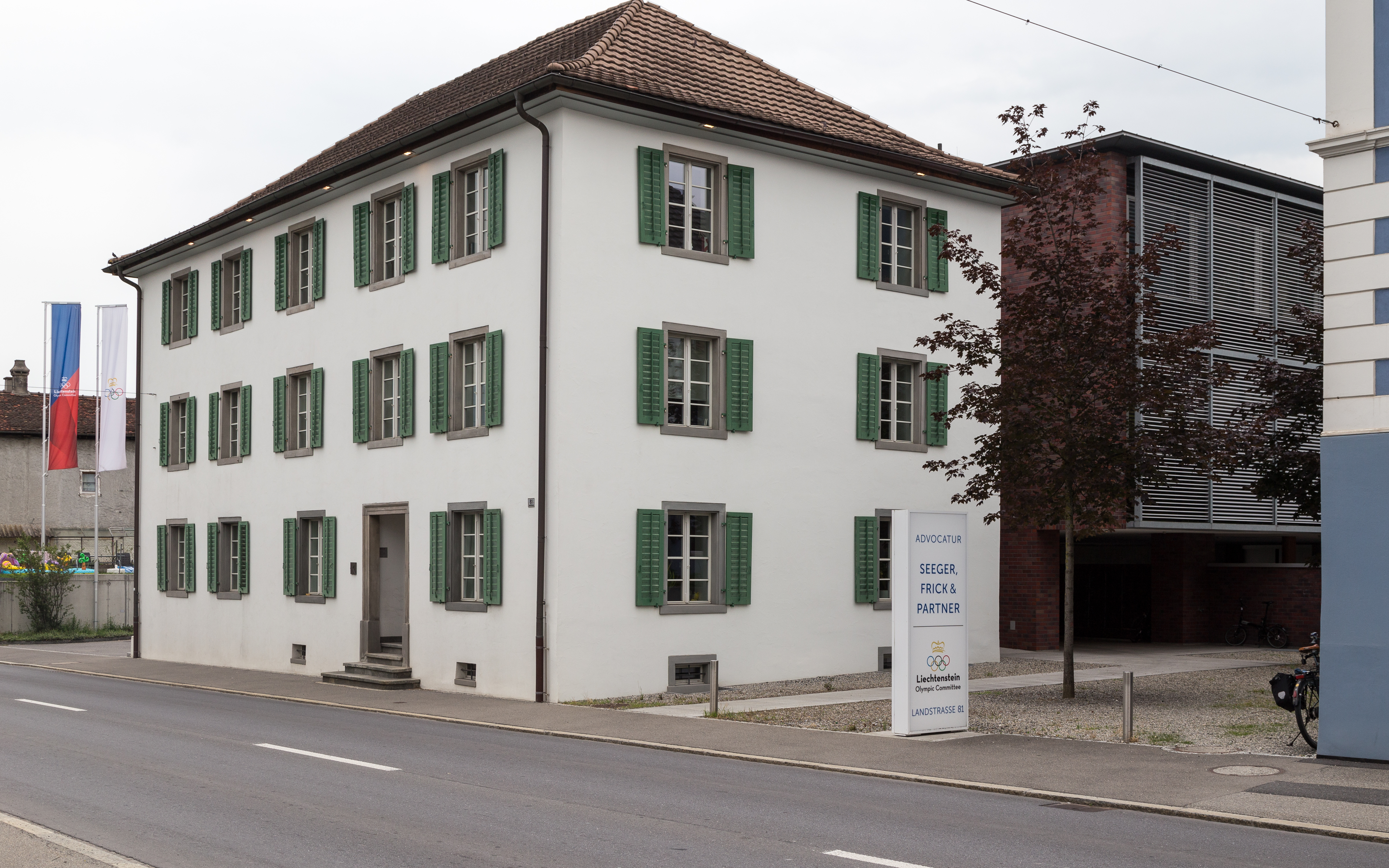
Liechtenstein Olympic Committee in Schaan

== Establishment ==
The motive to establish a National Olympic Committee for Liechtenstein was the wish to participate in the Summer Olympic Games and Winter Olympic Games in Germany in the year 1936. Falz-Fein originally came up with the idea after winning a French students' cycling championship and he was asked when visiting his aunt in Switzerland if Liechtenstein had a National Olympic Committee, to which the answer was negative. As a result, he founded the Liechtenstein Olympic Committee in 1935 to ensure Liechtenstein was represented at the Olympic Games.

Through the engagement of Baron Eduard von Falz-Fein the first NOC of Liechtenstein was founded to meet the formal requirements given by the IOC for the participation in the Olympic Games. This step was successful and for the first time a delegation of two athletes, three shooters and one cyclist was sent to Berlin in the summer to participate in their first Olympic Games for Liechtenstein.During the Opening Ceremony of the 1936 Summer Olympics, Falz-Fein noticed that Liechtenstein's flag was exactly the same as the flag of Haiti and he quickly telephoned the Olympic Committee and the government, stating that they had to change the flag. This was done by the addition of a princely crown. Despite his financial support for the Olympics, Falz-Fein never became president of the Liechtenstein Olympic Committee.

In the following Winter Games another delegation with two alpine skiers and one two-man bobsleigh team was sent to represent Liechtenstein. Since then Liechtenstein participated in almost all Winter and Summer Olympic Games. During the 1956 Winter Olympics in Italy, Falz-Fein drove the entire Liechtenstein team of athletes and Olympic Committee officials to the Games in his car.

In 1992, the Olympic sports governance in Liechtenstein was reorganised as the Liechtenstein Olympic Sports Federation, which involved the merging of the Liechtenstein Olympic Committee, the Princely Liechtenstein Sports Association and the Liechtenstein Sports Aid Foundation. In 2014, the Liechtenstein Olympic Sports Federation changed its name to the Liechtenstein Olympic Committee as well as unveiling a new logo.

=== Athlete employment program ===
On 1 July 2023, the Liechtenstein Olympic Committee confirmed the employment of six athletes (from 19 applicants) as a result of increased funding from the state government. Alpine skier Marco Pfiffner was amongst the original selection of athletes, but was sacked in July 2025 following budget cuts at the Liechtenstein Ski Association, despite qualifying for the 2026 Winter Olympics. Current beneficiaries include:

- Robin Frommelt – Cross-country skiing
- Nico Gauer – Alpine skiing
- Romano Püntener – Mountain biking
- Kathinka von Deichmann – Tennis
- Fabienne Wohlwend – Motorsport

== See also ==
- Liechtenstein at the Olympics
