= Women in the FBP =

Women's section of the Progressive Citizens' Party

Women in the FBP Frauen in der FBP
- Chairperson: Ulrike Charles
- Founded: September 1982; 42 years ago
- Ideology: Feminism
- National affiliation: Progressive Citizens' Party
- Colours: Blue

Website
- www.fbp.li/partei/sektionen/frauen-in-der-fbp

Women in the Progressive Citizens' Party (German: Frauen in der Fortschrittliche Bürgerpartei in Liechtenstein), often shortened to Women in the FBP (German: Frauen in der FBP), is a section of the Progressive Citizens' Party that officially represents the women's wing of the party. It is a grassroots group which provides campaigning, training and support for women within the party, and also general women-specific issues and equal rights.

== History ==
The FBP first supported the introduction of women's suffrage in Liechtenstein in 1970. However, two separate referendums on the issue were rejected by male-only voters in 1971 and 1973 respectively. The Women in the FBP group was founded in September 1982 to represent women's issues within the party, and also to further advocate for the introduction of women's suffrage. The party then again proposed the issue to the Landtag of Liechtenstein in December 1983 and again in April 1984. Following a successful referendum (among men only) in July 1984, women's suffrage was introduced to Liechtenstein.

Emma Eigenmann, belonging to the FBP, was the woman elected to the Landtag of Liechtenstein in 1986. In the first Mario Frick cabinet, Cornelia Gassner, also belonging to the FBP, became the first female government councillor. Rita Kieber-Beck was also the first female Deputy Prime Minister of Liechtenstein. Today, the group functions to campaign, provide training and support women within the party, as well as general gender-specific issues and supporting equal rights.

== See also ==
- Progressive Citizens' Party
- Women's suffrage in Liechtenstein
