= Feminism =

Range of socio-political movements and ideologies

The merged Venus symbol with raised fist is a symbol of feminism; Robin Morgan designed it for a protest of the 1969 Miss America pageant, where it was popularized.

Feminism is a range of socio-political movements and ideologies that aim to define and establish the political, economic, personal, and social equality of the sexes. Feminism holds the position that modern societies are patriarchal—they prioritize the male point of view—and that women are treated unjustly in these societies. Efforts to change this include fighting against gender stereotypes, breaking down traditional gender roles, and improving educational, professional, and interpersonal opportunities and outcomes for women. A person who advocates for feminism is known as a feminist.

Originating in late 18th-century Europe, feminist movements have campaigned for women's rights, including the right to vote, run for public office, work, earn equal pay, own property, receive education, enter into contracts, have equal rights within marriage, and maternity leave. Feminists support access to contraception, legal abortions, and social integration; and to protect women and girls from sexual assault, sexual harassment, and domestic violence. Changes in female dress standards and acceptable physical activities for women have also been part of feminist movements.

Many scholars consider feminist campaigns to be a main force behind major historical societal changes for women's rights, particularly in the West, where they are near-universally credited with achieving women's suffrage, gender-neutral language, reproductive rights for women (including access to contraceptives and abortion), and the right to enter into contracts and own property. Although feminist advocacy is, and has been, mainly focused on women's rights, some argue for the inclusion of men's liberation within its aims, because they believe that men are also harmed by traditional gender roles. Feminist theory, which emerged from feminist movements, aims to understand the nature of gender inequality by examining women's social roles and lived experiences. Feminist theorists have developed theories in a variety of disciplines in order to respond to issues concerning gender.

Numerous feminist movements and ideologies have developed over the years, representing different viewpoints and political aims. Traditionally, since the 19th century, first-wave liberal feminism, which sought political and legal equality through reforms within a liberal democratic framework, was contrasted with labour-based proletarian women's movements that over time developed into socialist and Marxist feminism based on class struggle theory. Since the 1960s, both of these traditions are also contrasted with the radical feminism that arose from the radical wing of second-wave feminism and that calls for a radical reordering of society to eliminate patriarchy. Liberal, socialist, and radical feminism are sometimes referred to as the "Big Three" schools of feminist thought. Modern feminist activism, scholarship, and policy tend to define contemporary feminism as a movement grounded in human rights, solidarity, and intersectionality; for example UN Women emphasized in 2024 that "the feminist goals of intersectional justice and gender equality can only be achieved if all women and all LGBTIQ+ people are included as part of a broad, intersectional feminist movement rooted in the universality and indivisibility of human rights," while a group of 28 Nordic feminist studies departments, academic journals and feminist organizations in 2025 defined feminism as "a universal human rights movement built on solidarity, intersectionality, and compassion."

Since the late 20th century, many newer forms of feminism have emerged. Some forms, such as white feminism and trans-exclusionary radical feminism (also known as gender-critical feminism), have been criticized as taking into account only white, female, middle class, college-educated, heterosexual, or cisgender perspectives. These criticisms have led to the creation of ethnically specific or multicultural forms of feminism, such as black feminism and intersectional feminism. These criticisms have also lead to the creation of movements such as the Men's Rights Movement.

== History ==
=== Terminology ===
Mary Wollstonecraft is seen by many as a founder of feminism due to her 1792 book titled A Vindication of the Rights of Woman in which she argues that class and private property are the basis of discrimination against women, and that women as much as men needed equal rights. Charles Fourier, a utopian socialist and French philosopher, is credited with having coined the word "féminisme" in 1837, but no trace of the word have been found in his works. The word "féminisme" ("feminism") first appeared in France in 1871 in a medicine thesis about men suffering from tuberculosis and having developed, according to the author Ferdinand-Valère Faneau de la Cour, feminine traits. The word "féministe" ("feminist"), inspired by its medical use, was coined by Alexandre Dumas fils in a 1872 essay, referring to men who supported women's rights. In both cases, the use of the word was very negative and reflected a criticism of a so-called "confusion of the sexes" by women who refused to abide by the sexual division of society and challenged the inequalities between sexes.

The concepts appeared in the Netherlands in 1872, Great Britain in the 1890s, and the United States in 1910. The Oxford English Dictionary dates the first appearance in English in this meaning back to 1895. Depending on the historical moment, culture and country, feminists around the world have had different causes and goals. Most western feminist historians contend that all movements working to obtain women's rights should be considered feminist movements, even when they did not (or do not) apply the term to themselves. Other historians assert that the term should be limited to the modern feminist movement and its descendants. Those historians use the label "protofeminist" to describe earlier movements.

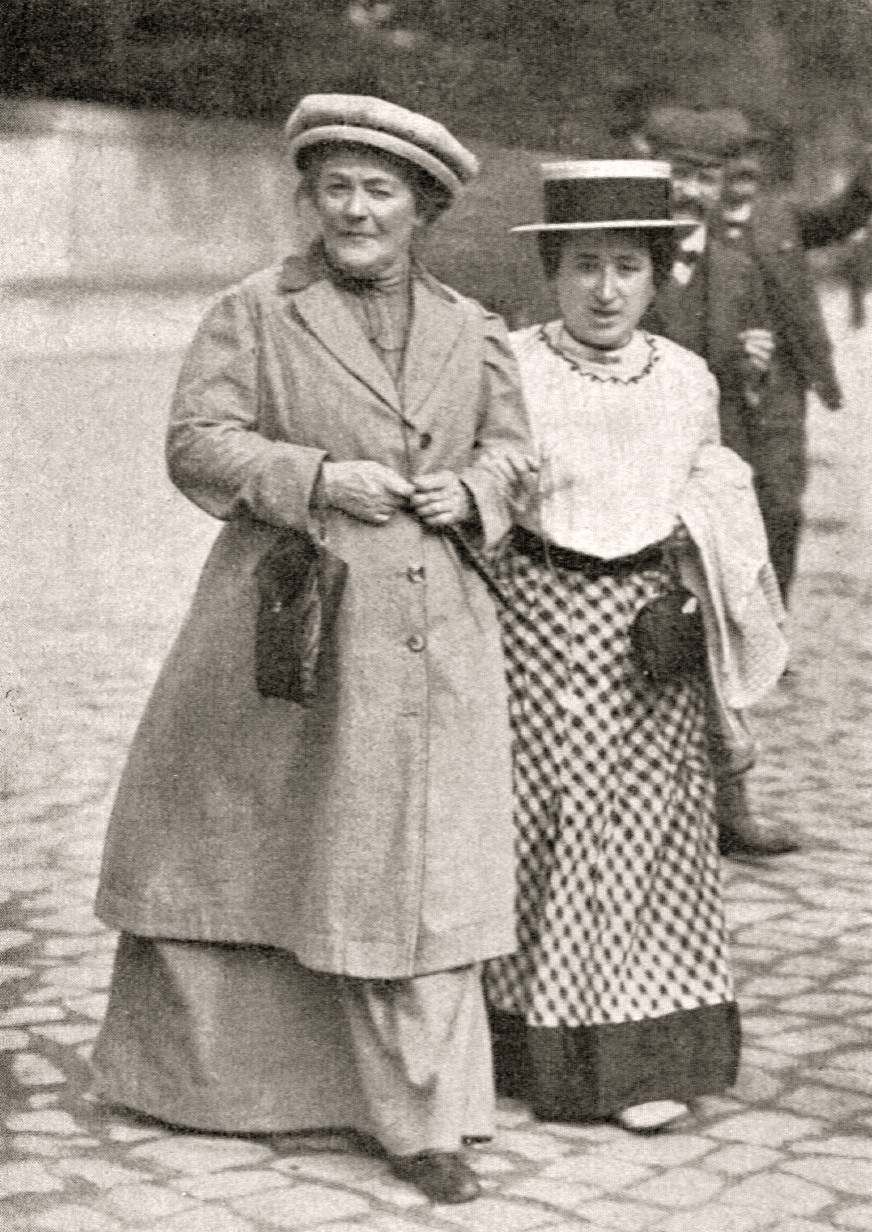
Clara Zetkin (left) with Rosa Luxemburg (right) in January 1910. Zetkin partly initiated International Women's Day.

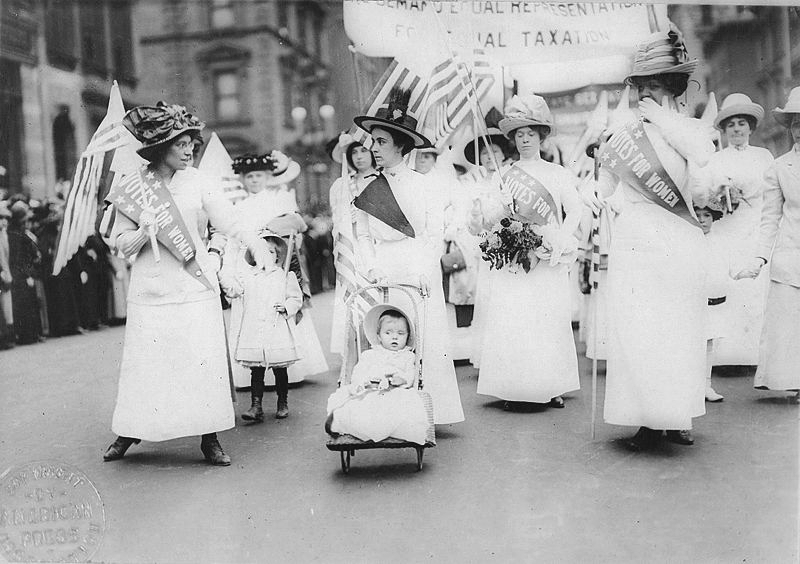
Feminist suffrage parade, New York City, 1912

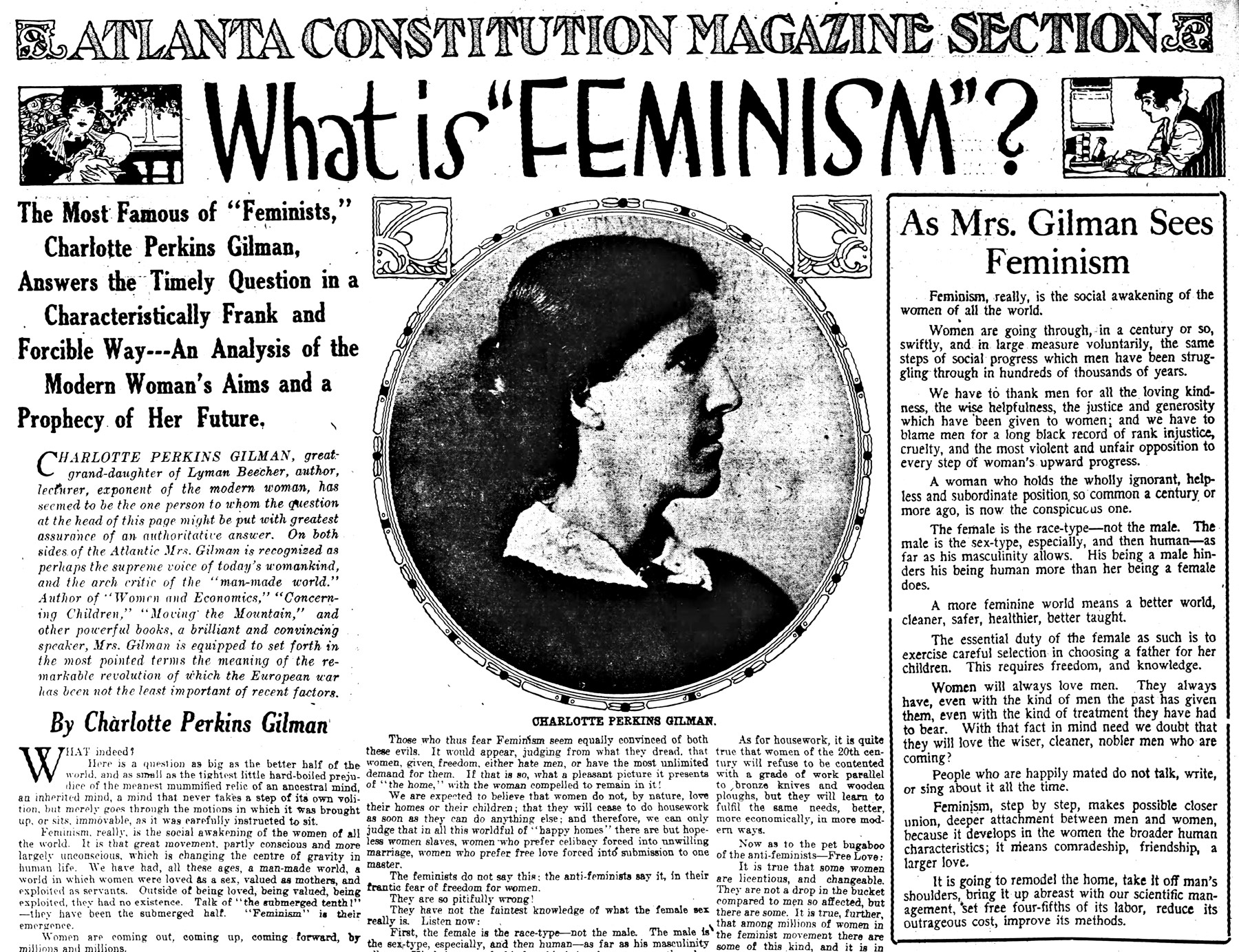
Charlotte Perkins Gilman wrote about feminism for the Atlanta Constitution, 10 December 1916.

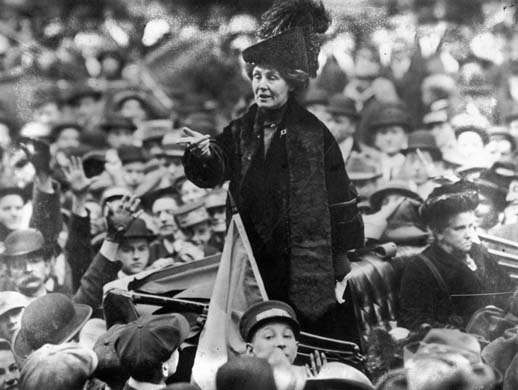
After selling her home, Emmeline Pankhurst, pictured in New York City in 1913, travelled constantly, giving speeches throughout Britain and the United States.

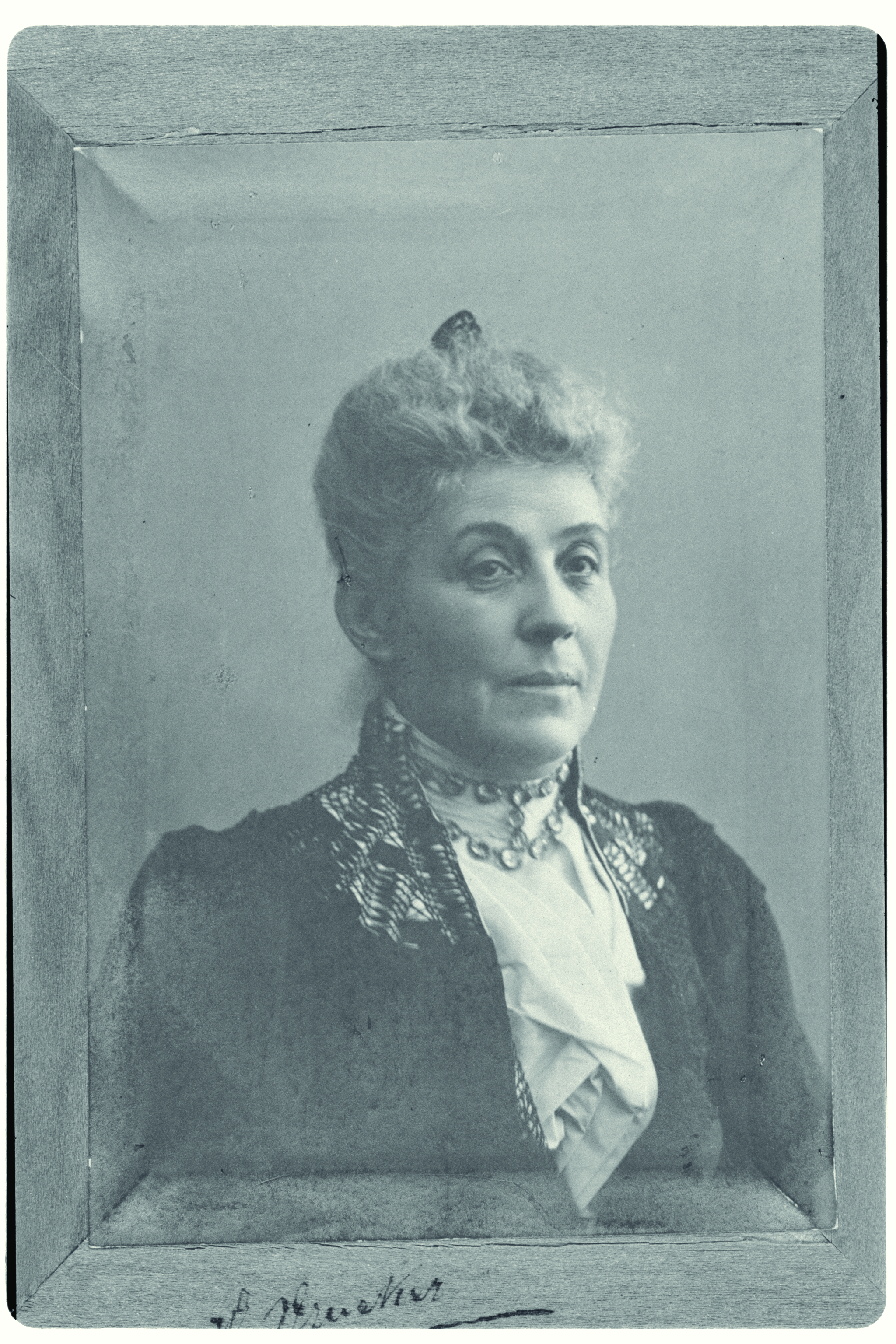
In the Netherlands, Wilhelmina Drucker (1847–1925) fought successfully for the vote and equal rights for women, through organizations she founded.

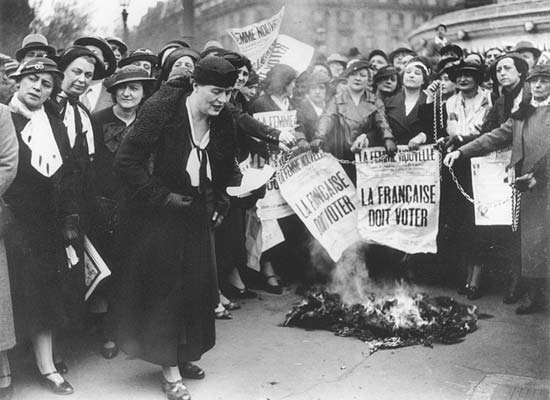
Louise Weiss along with other Parisian suffragettes in 1935. The newspaper headline reads "The Frenchwoman Must Vote".

=== Waves ===
The history of the modern western feminist movement is divided into multiple "waves". The first comprised women's suffrage movements of the 19th and early-20th centuries, promoting women's right to vote. The second wave, the women's liberation movement, began in the 1960s and campaigned for legal and social equality for women. In or around 1992, a third wave was identified, characterized by a focus on individuality and diversity. Additionally, some have argued for the existence of a fourth wave, starting around 2012, which has used social media to combat sexual harassment, violence against women and rape culture; it is best known for the Me Too movement.

=== 19th and early 20th centuries ===
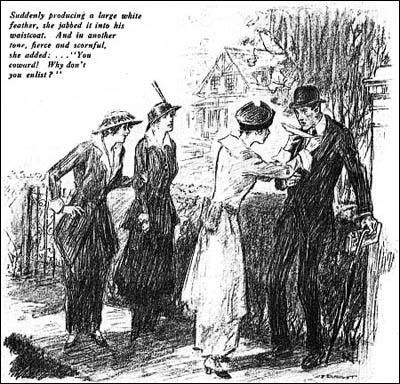
"The White Feather: A Sketch of English Recruiting" (Arnold Bennett, 1914). Early feminists spearheaded the White Feather Campaign in order to drum up enlistment in the army by shaming men into joining.

First-wave feminism was a period of activity during the 19th and early-20th centuries. In the UK and US, it focused on the promotion of equal contract, marriage, parenting, and property rights for women. New legislation included the Custody of Infants Act 1839 in the UK, which introduced the tender years doctrine for child custody and gave women the right of custody of their children for the first time. Other legislation, such as the Married Women's Property Act 1870 in the UK and extended in the 1882 Act, became models for similar legislation in other British territories. Victoria passed legislation in 1884 and New South Wales in 1889; the remaining Australian colonies passed similar legislation between 1890 and 1897. With the turn of the 19th century, activism focused primarily on gaining political power, particularly the right of women's suffrage, though some feminists were active in campaigning for women's sexual, reproductive, and economic rights too.

Women's suffrage (the right to vote and stand for parliamentary office) began in Britain's Australasian colonies at the end of the 19th century, with the self-governing colony of New Zealand granting women the right to vote in 1893; South Australia followed suit with the Constitutional Amendment (Adult Suffrage) Act in 1894. This was followed by Australia granting female suffrage in 1902.

In Britain, the suffragettes and suffragists campaigned for the women's vote, as well as served the government and increase military enlistment by participating in the White Feather Campaign. In 1918 the Representation of the People Act was passed granting the vote to women over the age of 30 who owned property. In 1928, this was extended to all women over 21. Emmeline Pankhurst was the most notable activist in England. Time named her one of the 100 Most Important People of the 20th Century, stating: "she shaped an idea of women for our time; she shook society into a new pattern from which there could be no going back." In the US, notable leaders of this movement included Lucretia Mott, Elizabeth Cady Stanton, and Susan B. Anthony, who each campaigned for the abolition of slavery before championing women's right to vote. These women were influenced by the Quaker theology of spiritual equality, which asserts that men and women are equal under God. They were also influenced by earlier American feminist thought leaders Judith Sargent Murray, John Neal, Sarah Moore Grimké, and Margaret Fuller. In the US, first-wave feminism is considered to have ended with the passage of the Nineteenth Amendment to the United States Constitution (1919), granting women the right to vote in all states. The term first wave was coined retroactively when the term second-wave feminism came into use.

In Germany, feminists like Clara Zetkin were very interested in women's politics, including the fight for equal opportunities and women's suffrage, through socialism. She helped to develop the social-democratic women's movement in Germany. From 1891 to 1917, she edited the SPD women's newspaper Die Gleichheit (Equality). In 1907 she became the leader of the newly founded "Women's Office" at the SPD. She also contributed to International Women's Day (IWD).

During the late Qing period and reform movements such as the Hundred Days' Reform, Chinese feminists called for women's liberation from traditional roles and Neo-Confucian gender segregation. Later, the Chinese Communist Party created projects aimed at integrating women into the workforce, and claimed that the revolution had successfully achieved women's liberation.

According to Nawar al-Hassan Golley, Arab feminism was closely connected with Arab nationalism. In 1899, Qasim Amin, considered the "father" of Arab feminism, wrote The Liberation of Women, which argued for legal and social reforms for women. He drew links between women's position in Egyptian society and nationalism, leading to the development of Cairo University and the National Movement. In 1923 Hoda Shaarawi founded the Egyptian Feminist Union, became its president and a symbol of the Arab women's rights movement.

The Iranian Constitutional Revolution in 1905 triggered the Iranian women's movement, which aimed to achieve women's equality in education, marriage, careers, and legal rights. However, during the Iranian revolution of 1979, many of the rights that women had gained from the women's movement were systematically abolished, such as the Family Protection Law.

=== Mid-20th century ===
In the mid-20th century, women continued to lack significant rights. In France, women obtained the right to vote only with the Provisional Government of the French Republic of 21 April 1944. The Consultative Assembly of Algiers of 1944 proposed on 24 March 1944 to grant eligibility to women but following an amendment by Fernard Grenier, they were given full citizenship, including the right to vote. Grenier's proposition was adopted 51 to 16. In May 1947, following the November 1946 elections, the sociologist Robert Verdier minimized the "gender gap", stating in Le Populaire that women had not voted in a consistent way, dividing themselves, as men, according to social classes. During the baby boom period, feminism waned in importance. Wars (both World War I and World War II) had seen the provisional emancipation of some women, but post-war periods signalled the return to conservative roles.

In Switzerland, women gained the right to vote in federal elections in 1971; but in the canton of Appenzell Innerrhoden women obtained the right to vote on local issues only in 1991, when the canton was forced to do so by the Federal Supreme Court of Switzerland. In Liechtenstein, women were given the right to vote by the women's suffrage referendum of 1984. Three prior referendums held in 1968, 1971 and 1973 had failed to secure women's right to vote.

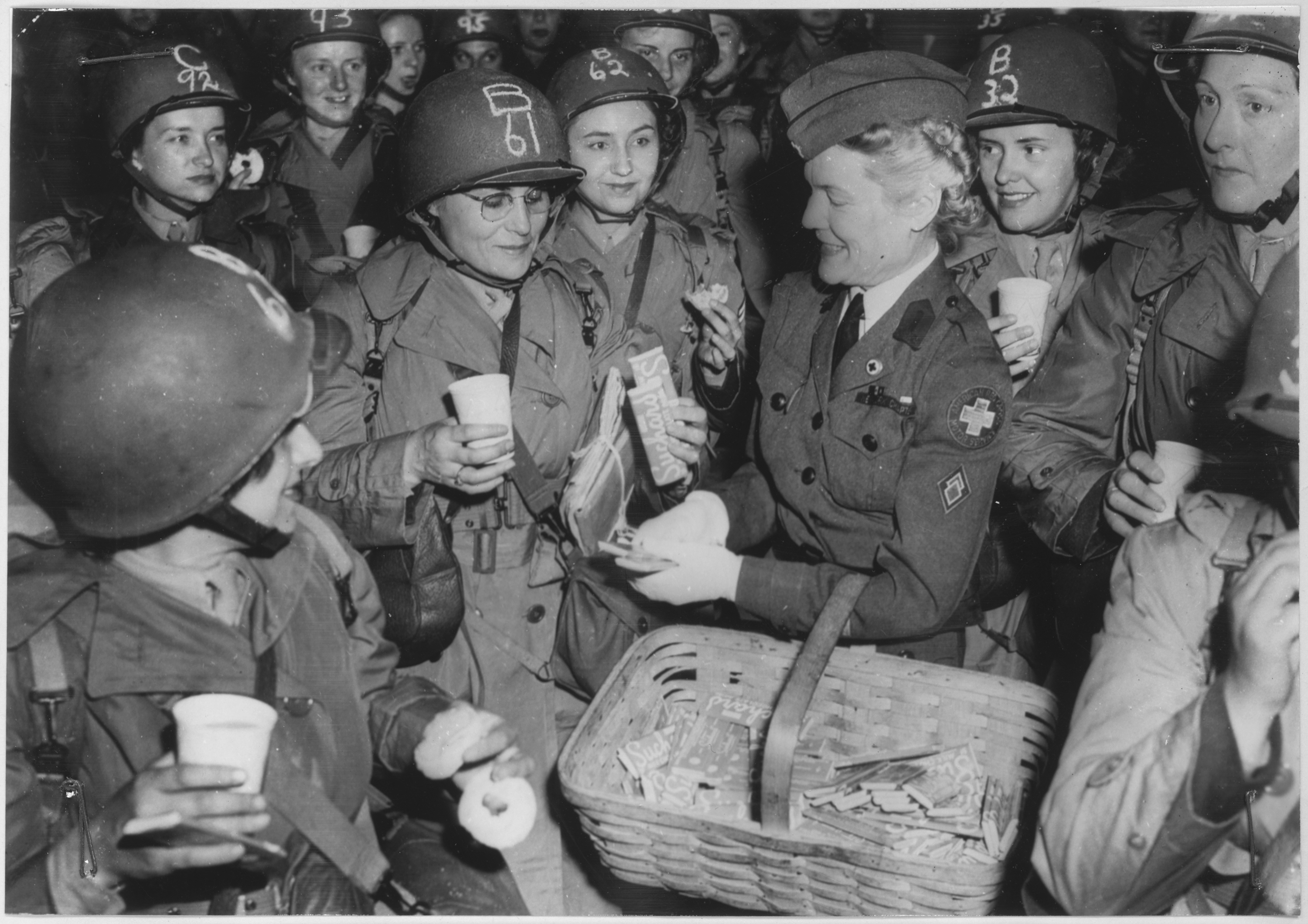
Workers in the US Women's Army Corps deploying to Europe to fulfill the labor roles of men who were being redeployed to the Pacific, 1945

Feminists continued to campaign for the reform of family laws which gave husbands control over their wives. Although by the 20th century coverture had been abolished in the UK and US, married women in many continental European countries still had very few rights. For instance, in France, married women did not receive the right to work without their husband's permission until 1965. Feminists have also worked to abolish the "marital exemption" in rape laws which precluded the prosecution of husbands for the rape of their wives. Earlier efforts by first-wave feminists such as Voltairine de Cleyre, Victoria Woodhull and Elizabeth Clarke Wolstenholme-Elmy to criminalize marital rape in the late 19th century had failed; this was only achieved a century later in most Western countries, but is still not achieved in many other parts of the world.

French philosopher Simone de Beauvoir articulated an existentialist view on many of the questions of feminism with the publication of The Second Sex in 1949. The book critically studies the biology, history, myth, and lived experience of becoming a woman from childhood onward in order to defend the abstract rights and concrete possibilities of womanhood "without which freedom is merely mystification". By demystifying woman conceived of as the Other, Simone de Beauvior considers the condition of the "second sex" to subject woman "on the whole" to serfdom, and therefore she "knows and chooses herself not as she exists herself but as man defines her." As Ulrika Björk writes, "[Simone de Beauvoir's] aim is first of all to study 'the light in which woman is viewed by biology, psychoanalysis and historical materialism', and then the myth of the eternal feminine, in order to understand how woman has become the other [l’Autre] in relation to man' [...]."

Second-wave feminism is a feminist movement beginning in the early 1960s and continuing to the present; as such, it coexists with third-wave feminism. Second-wave feminism is largely concerned with issues of equality beyond suffrage, such as ending gender discrimination.

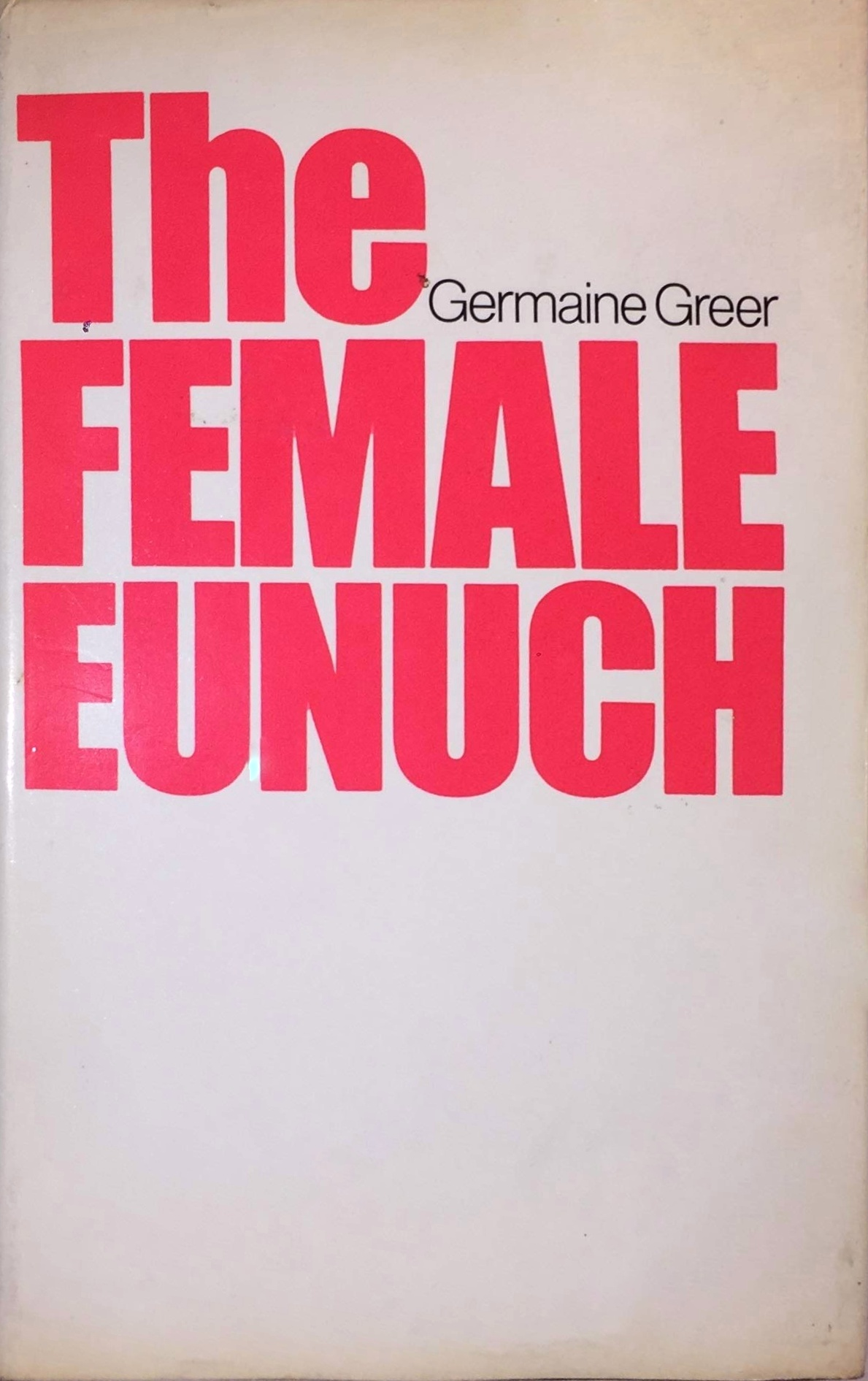
The Feminine Mystique (1963) by Betty Friedan and The Female Eunuch (1970) by Germaine Greer are considered landmark texts in second-wave feminism.

Second-wave feminists see women's cultural and political inequalities as inextricably linked and encourage women to understand aspects of their personal lives as deeply politicized and as reflecting sexist power structures. The feminist activist and author Carol Hanisch coined the slogan "The Personal is Political", which became synonymous with the second wave.

Second- and third-wave feminism in China has been characterized by a reexamination of women's roles during the communist revolution and other reform movements, and new discussions about whether women's equality has actually been fully achieved.

In 1956, President Gamal Abdel Nasser of Egypt initiated "state feminism", which outlawed discrimination based on gender and granted women's suffrage, but also blocked political activism by feminist leaders. During Sadat's presidency, his wife, Jehan Sadat, publicly advocated further women's rights, though Egyptian policy and society began to move away from women's equality with the new Islamist movement and growing conservatism. However, some activists proposed a new feminist movement, Islamic feminism, which argues for women's equality within an Islamic framework. In 1963, Mohammad Reza Shah announced a series of reforms under the title of 'White Revolution'. A major part of these reforms was giving Iranian women the right to vote and be elected in political institutions. This was significant in Iran and placed it well ahead of its neighbours in the Persian Gulf.

In Latin America, revolutions brought changes in women's status in countries such as Nicaragua, where feminist ideology during the Sandinista Revolution aided women's quality of life but fell short of achieving a social and ideological change.

In 1963, Betty Friedan's book The Feminine Mystique helped voice the discontent that American women felt. The book is widely credited with sparking the beginning of second-wave feminism in the United States. Within ten years, women made up over half the First World workforce. In 1970, Australian writer Germaine Greer published The Female Eunuch, which became a worldwide bestseller, reportedly driving up divorce rates.

=== Late 20th and early 21st centuries ===
==== Third-wave feminism ====
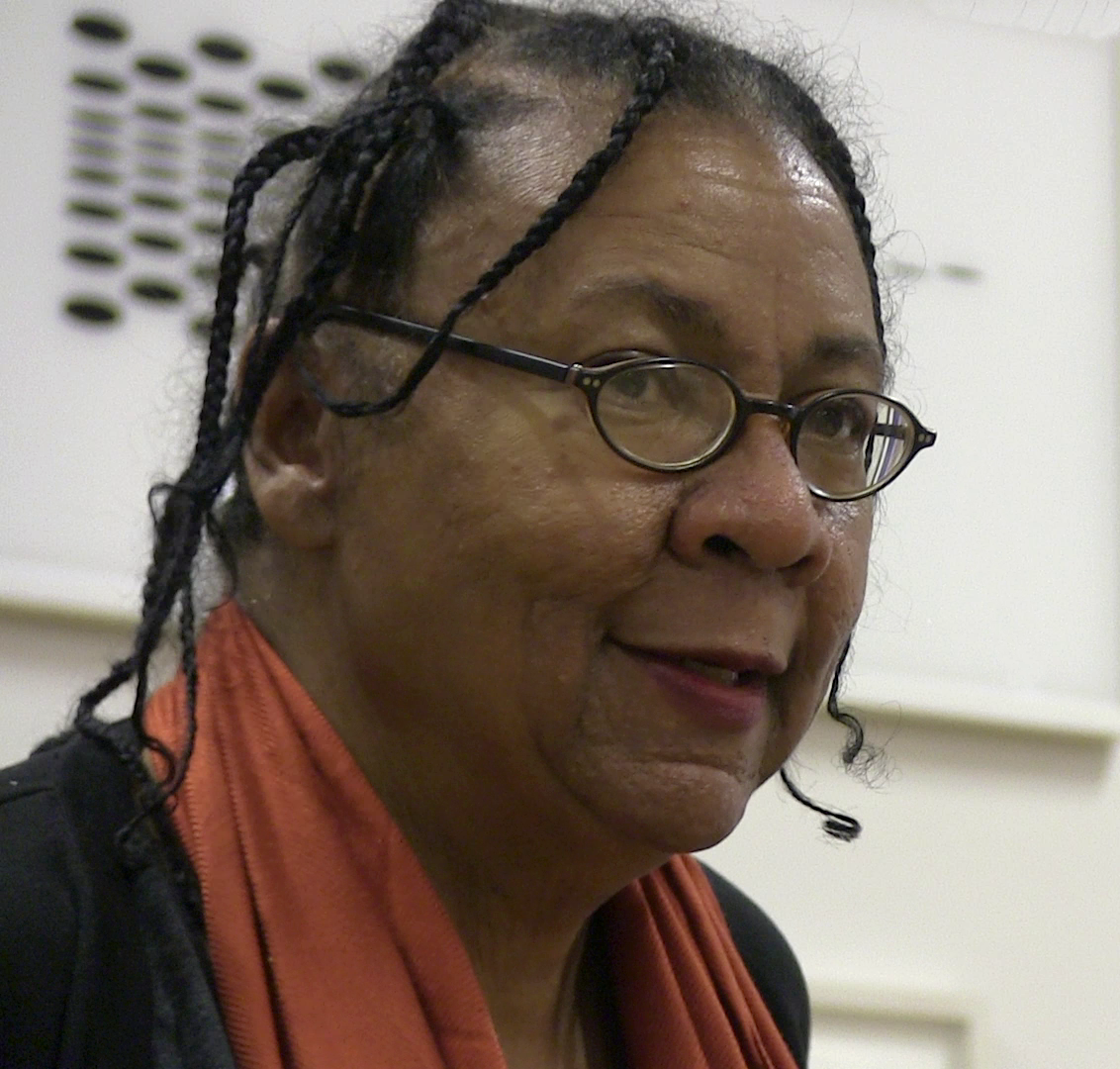
Feminist, author and social activist bell hooks (1952–2021)

Third-wave feminism is traced to the emergence of the riot grrrl feminist punk subculture in Olympia, Washington, in the early 1990s, and to Anita Hill's televised testimony in 1991—to an all-male, all-white Senate Judiciary Committee—that Clarence Thomas, nominated for the Supreme Court of the United States, had sexually harassed her. The term third wave is credited to Rebecca Walker, who responded to Thomas's appointment to the Supreme Court with an article in Ms. magazine, "Becoming the Third Wave" (1992). She wrote:

So I write this as a plea to all women, especially women of my generation: Let Thomas' confirmation serve to remind you, as it did me, that the fight is far from over. Let this dismissal of a woman's experience move you to anger. Turn that outrage into political power. Do not vote for them unless they work for us. Do not have sex with them, do not break bread with them, do not nurture them if they don't prioritize our freedom to control our bodies and our lives. I am not a post-feminism feminist. I am the Third Wave.

Third-wave feminism also sought to challenge or avoid what it deemed the second wave's essentialist definitions of femininity, which, third-wave feminists argued, overemphasized the experiences of upper middle-class white women. Third-wave feminists often focused on "micro-politics" and challenged the second wave's paradigm as to what was, or was not, good for women, and tended to use a post-structuralist interpretation of gender and sexuality. Feminist leaders rooted in the second wave, such as Gloria Anzaldúa, bell hooks, Chela Sandoval, Cherríe Moraga, Audre Lorde, Maxine Hong Kingston, and many other non-white feminists, sought to negotiate a space within feminist thought for consideration of race-related subjectivities. Third-wave feminism also contained internal debates between difference feminists, who believe that there are important psychological differences between the sexes, and those who believe that there are no inherent psychological differences between the sexes and contend that gender roles are due to social conditioning.

==== Standpoint theory ====
Standpoint theory is a feminist theoretical point of view stating that a person's social position influences their knowledge. This perspective argues that research and theory treat women and the feminist movement as insignificant and refuses to see traditional science as unbiased. Since the 1980s, standpoint feminists have argued that the feminist movement should address global issues (such as rape, incest, and prostitution) and culturally specific issues (such as female genital mutilation in some parts of Africa and Arab societies, as well as glass ceiling practices that impede women's advancement in developed economies) in order to understand how gender inequality interacts with racism, homophobia, classism, and colonization in a "matrix of domination".

==== Fourth-wave feminism ====
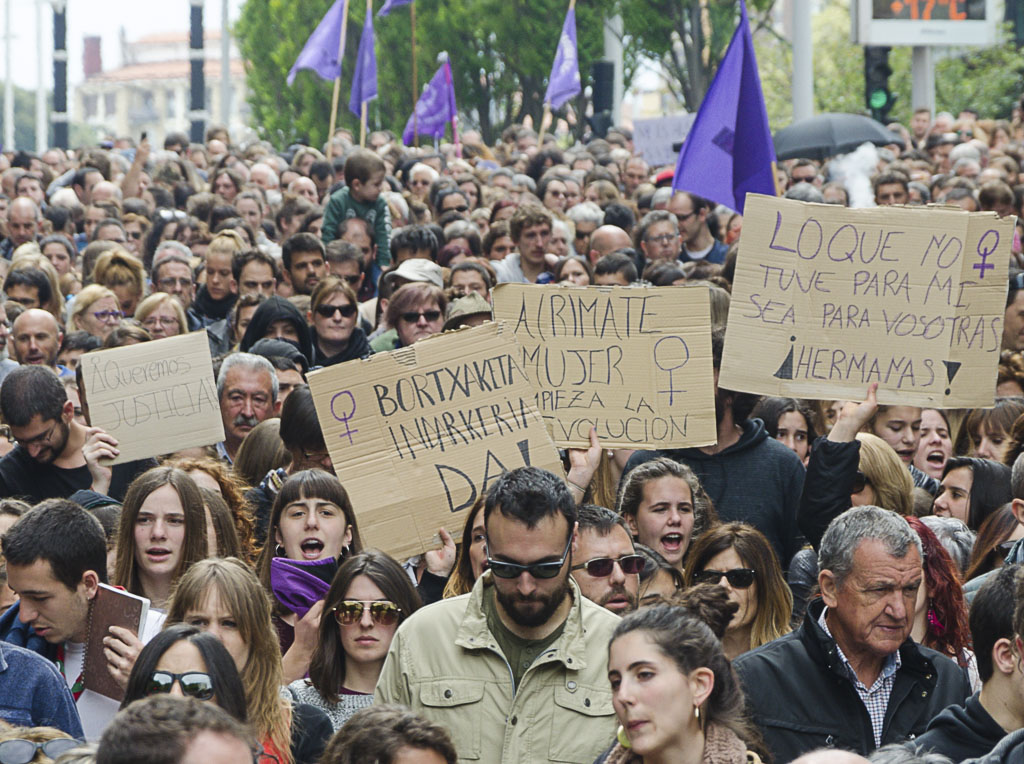
Protest against La Manada sexual abuse case sentence, Pamplona, 2018

Fourth-wave feminism is a proposed extension of third-wave feminism which corresponds to a resurgence in interest in feminism beginning around 2012 and associated with the use of social media. According to feminist scholar Prudence Chamberlain, the focus of the fourth wave is justice for women and opposition to sexual harassment and violence against women. Its essence, she writes, is "incredulity that certain attitudes can still exist".

Fourth-wave feminism is "defined by technology", according to Kira Cochrane, and is characterized particularly by the use of Facebook, Twitter, Instagram, YouTube, Tumblr, and blogs such as Feministing to challenge misogyny and further gender equality.

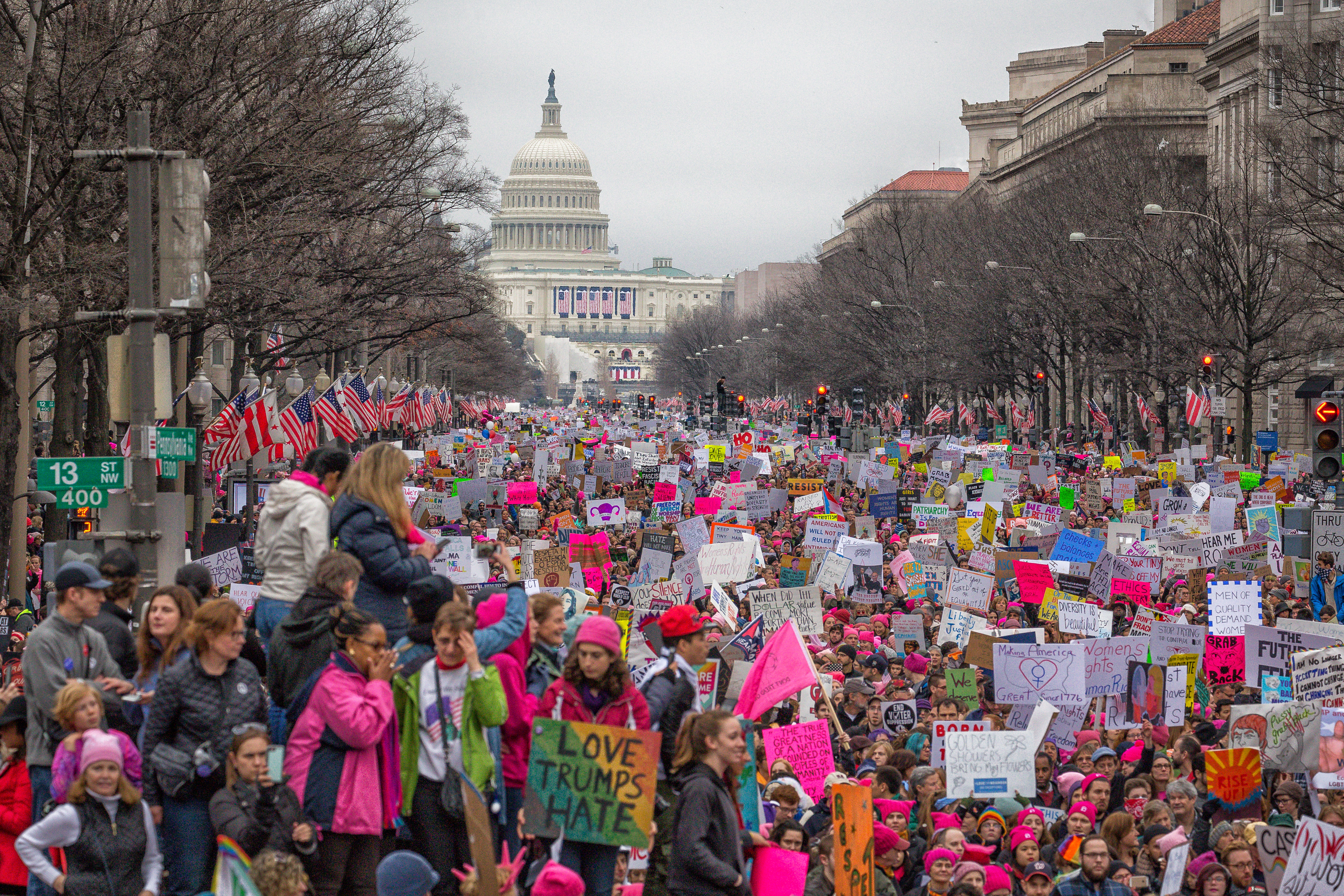
2017 Women's March, Washington, D.C.

Issues that fourth-wave feminists focus on include street and workplace harassment, campus sexual assault, and rape culture. Scandals involving the harassment, abuse, and murder of women and girls have galvanized the movement. These have included the 2012 Delhi gang rape, 2012 Jimmy Savile allegations, the Bill Cosby allegations, 2014 Isla Vista killings, 2016 trial of Jian Ghomeshi, 2017 Harvey Weinstein allegations, and subsequent Weinstein effect, and the 2017 Westminster sexual scandals.

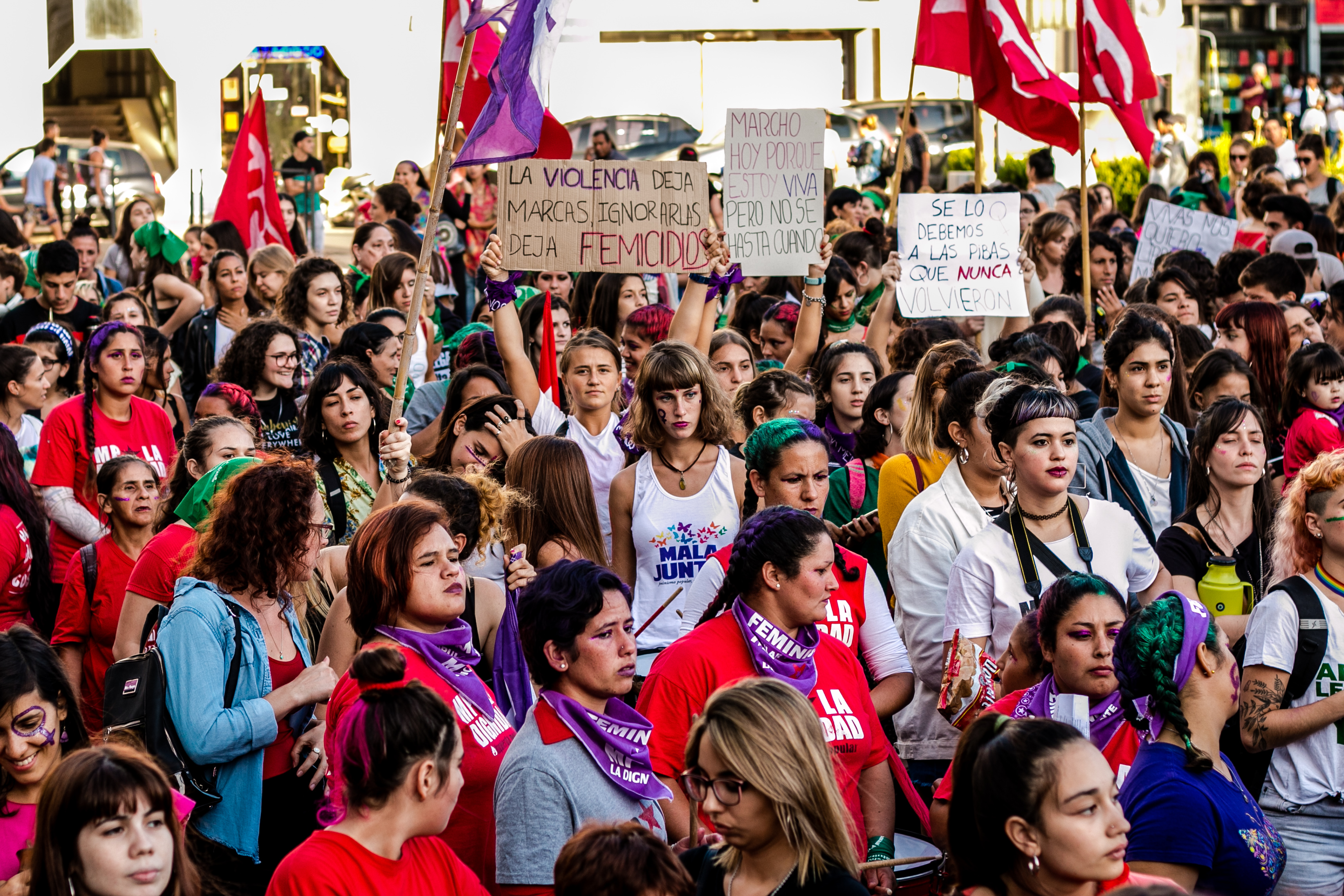
International Women's Strike, Paraná, Argentina, 2019

Examples of fourth-wave feminist campaigns include the Everyday Sexism Project, No More Page 3, Stop Bild Sexism, Mattress Performance, 10 Hours of Walking in NYC as a Woman, #YesAllWomen, Free the Nipple, One Billion Rising, the 2017 Women's March, the 2018 Women's March, and the #MeToo movement. In December 2017, Time magazine chose several prominent female activists involved in the #MeToo movement, dubbed "the silence breakers", as Person of the Year.

=== Decolonial feminism ===
Decolonial feminism reformulates the coloniality of gender by critiquing the very formation of gender and its subsequent formations of patriarchy and the gender binary, not as universal constants across cultures, but as structures that have been instituted by and for the benefit of European colonialism. Marìa Lugones proposes that decolonial feminism speaks to how "the colonial imposition of gender cuts across questions of ecology, economics, government, relations with the spirit world, and knowledge, as well as across everyday practices that either habituate us to take care of the world or to destroy it." Decolonial feminists like Karla Jessen Williamson and Rauna Kuokkanen have examined colonialism as a force that has imposed gender hierarchies on Indigenous women that have disempowered and fractured Indigenous communities and ways of life.

==== Postfeminism ====
The term postfeminism is used to describe a range of viewpoints reacting to feminism since the 1980s. While not being "anti-feminist", postfeminists believe that women have achieved second wave goals while being critical of third- and fourth-wave feminist goals. The term was first used to describe a backlash against second-wave feminism, but it is now a label for a wide range of theories that take critical approaches to previous feminist discourses and includes challenges to the second wave's ideas. Other postfeminists say that feminism is no longer relevant to today's society. Amelia Jones has written that the postfeminist texts which emerged in the 1980s and 1990s portrayed second-wave feminism as a monolithic entity. Dorothy Chunn describes a "blaming narrative" under the postfeminist moniker, where feminists are undermined for continuing to make demands for gender equality in a "post-feminist" society, where "gender equality has (already) been achieved". According to Chunn, "many feminists have voiced disquiet about the ways in which rights and equality discourses are now used against them".

== Theory ==
Feminist theory is the extension of feminism into theoretical or philosophical fields. It encompasses work in a variety of disciplines, including anthropology, sociology, economics, women's studies, literary criticism, art history, psychoanalysis, and philosophy. Feminist theory aims to understand gender inequality and focuses on gender politics, power relations, and sexuality. While providing a critique of these social and political relations, much of feminist theory also focuses on the promotion of women's rights and interests. Themes explored in feminist theory include discrimination, stereotyping, objectification (especially sexual objectification), oppression, and patriarchy. In the field of literary criticism, Elaine Showalter describes the development of feminist theory as having three phases. The first she calls "feminist critique", in which the feminist reader examines the ideologies behind literary phenomena. The second Showalter calls "gynocriticism", in which the "woman is producer of textual meaning". The last phase she calls "gender theory", in which the "ideological inscription and the literary effects of the sex/gender system are explored".

This was paralleled in the 1970s by French feminists, who developed the concept of écriture féminine (which translates as "female or feminine writing"). Hélène Cixous argues that writing and philosophy are phallocentric and along with other French feminists such as Luce Irigaray emphasize "writing from the body" as a subversive exercise. The work of Julia Kristeva, a feminist psychoanalyst and philosopher, and Bracha Ettinger, artist and psychoanalyst, has influenced feminist theory in general and feminist literary criticism in particular. However, as the scholar Elizabeth Wright points out, "none of these French feminists align themselves with the feminist movement as it appeared in the Anglophone world".

== Movements and ideologies ==
Many overlapping feminist movements and ideologies have developed over the years. Feminism is often divided into three main traditions called liberal, radical, and socialist/Marxist feminism, sometimes known as the "Big Three" schools of feminist thought. Since the late 20th century, newer forms of feminisms have also emerged. Some branches of feminism track the political leanings of the larger society to a greater or lesser degree, or focus on specific topics, such as the environment.

Modern feminist activism, scholarship, and policy tend to define contemporary feminism as a movement grounded in human rights, solidarity, and intersectionality. For example UN Women emphasized in 2024 that "the feminist goals of intersectional justice and gender equality can only be achieved if all women and all LGBTIQ+ people are included as part of a broad, intersectional feminist movement rooted in the universality and indivisibility of human rights." Similarly, in 2025 a group of 28 Nordic feminist studies departments, academic journals and feminist organizations defined feminism as "a universal human rights movement built on solidarity, intersectionality, and compassion." Most feminists oppose all kinds of sexism including discrimination against men.

=== Liberal feminism ===
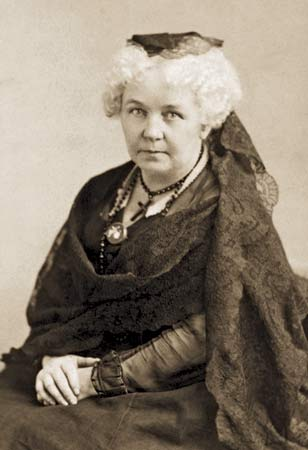
Elizabeth Cady Stanton, a major figure in 19th-century liberal feminism

Liberal feminism, also known under other names such as reformist, mainstream, or historically as bourgeois feminism, arose from 19th-century first-wave feminism, and was historically linked to 19th-century liberalism and progressivism, while 19th-century conservatives tended to oppose feminism as such. Liberal feminism seeks equality of men and women through political and legal reform within a liberal democratic framework, without radically altering the structure of society; liberal feminism "works within the structure of mainstream society to integrate women into that structure". During the 19th and early 20th centuries liberal feminism focused especially on women's suffrage and access to education. Former Norwegian supreme court justice and former president of the liberal Norwegian Association for Women's Rights, Karin Maria Bruzelius, has described liberal feminism as "a realistic, sober, practical feminism".

Susan Wendell argues that "liberal feminism is an historical tradition that grew out of liberalism, as can be seen very clearly in the work of such feminists as Mary Wollstonecraft and John Stuart Mill, but feminists who took principles from that tradition have developed analyses and goals that go far beyond those of 18th and 19th century liberal feminists, and many feminists who have goals and strategies identified as liberal feminist ... reject major components of liberalism" in a modern or party-political sense; she highlights "equality of opportunity" as a defining feature of liberal feminism.

Liberal feminism is a very broad term that encompasses many, often diverging modern branches and a variety of feminist and general political perspectives; some historically liberal branches are equality feminism, social feminism, equity feminism, difference feminism, individualist/libertarian feminism, and some forms of state feminism, particularly the state feminism of the Nordic countries. The broad field of liberal feminism is sometimes confused with the more recent and smaller branch known as libertarian feminism, which tends to diverge significantly from mainstream liberal feminism. For example, "libertarian feminism does not require social measures to reduce material inequality; in fact, it opposes such measures ... in contrast, liberal feminism may support such requirements and egalitarian versions of feminism insist on them."

Catherine Rottenberg notes that the raison d'être of classic liberal feminism was "to pose an immanent critique of liberalism, revealing the gendered exclusions within liberal democracy's proclamation of universal equality, particularly with respect to the law, institutional access, and the full incorporation of women into the public sphere." Rottenberg contrasts classic liberal feminism with modern neoliberal feminism, which "seems perfectly in sync with the evolving neoliberal order." According to Zhang and Rios, "liberal feminism tends to be adopted by 'mainstream' (i.e., middle-class) women who do not disagree with the current social structure." They found that liberal feminism with its focus on equality is viewed as the dominant and "default" form of feminism.

Some modern forms of feminism that historically grew out of the broader liberal tradition have more recently also been described as conservative in relative terms. This is particularly the case for libertarian feminism which conceives of people as self-owners and therefore as entitled to freedom from coercive interference.

=== Radical feminism ===
Radical feminism arose from the radical wing of second-wave feminism and calls for a radical reordering of society to eliminate male supremacy. It considers the male-controlled capitalist hierarchy as the defining feature of women's oppression and the total uprooting and reconstruction of society as necessary. Separatist feminism does not support heterosexual relationships. Lesbian feminism is thus closely related. Other feminists criticize separatist feminism as sexist.

=== Materialist ideologies ===
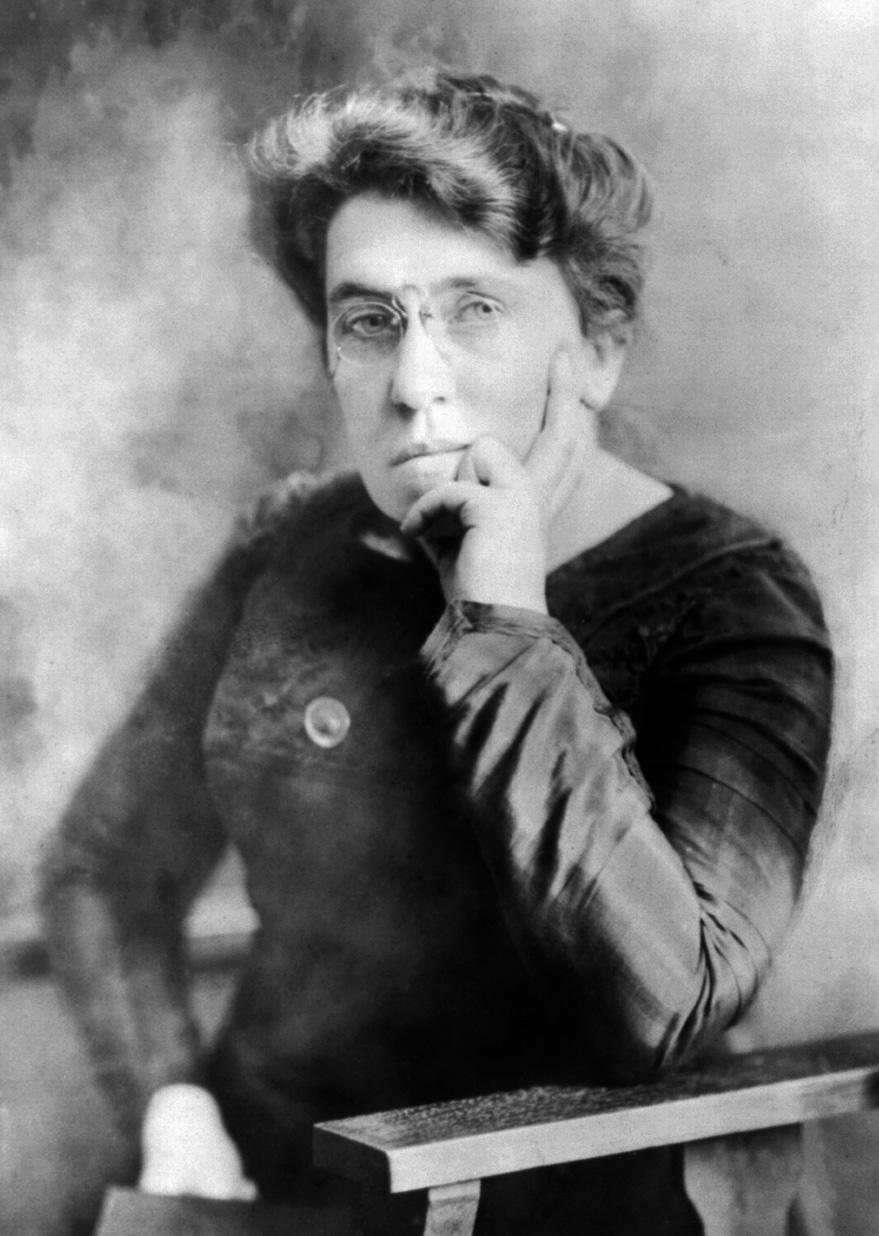
Emma Goldman, a union activist, labour organizer and feminist anarchist

Rosemary Hennessy and Chrys Ingraham say that materialist forms of feminism grew out of Western Marxist thought and have inspired a number of different (but overlapping) movements, all of which are involved in a critique of capitalism and are focused on ideology's relationship to women. Marxist feminism argues that capitalism is the root cause of women's oppression, and that discrimination against women in domestic life and employment is an effect of capitalist ideologies. Socialist feminism distinguishes itself from Marxist feminism by arguing that women's liberation can only be achieved by working to end both the economic and cultural sources of women's oppression. Anarcha-feminists believe that class struggle and anarchy against the state require struggling against patriarchy, which comes from involuntary hierarchy.

=== Other modern feminisms ===
==== Ecofeminism ====
Ecofeminists see men's control of land as responsible for the oppression of women and destruction of the natural environment. Ecofeminism has been criticized for focusing too much on a mystical connection between women and nature.

==== Black and postcolonial ideologies ====
Sara Ahmed argues that Black and postcolonial feminisms pose a challenge "to some of the organizing premises of Western feminist thought". During much of its history, feminist movements and theoretical developments were led predominantly by middle-class white women from Western Europe and North America. However, women of other races have proposed alternative feminisms. This trend accelerated in the 1960s with the civil rights movement in the United States and the end of Western European colonialism in Africa, the Caribbean, parts of Latin America, and Southeast Asia. Since that time, women in developing nations and former colonies and who are of color or various ethnicities or living in poverty have proposed additional feminisms. Womanism emerged after early feminist movements were largely white and middle-class. Postcolonial feminists argue that colonial oppression and Western feminism marginalized postcolonial women but did not turn them passive or voiceless. Third-world feminism and indigenous feminism are closely related to postcolonial feminism. These ideas also correspond with ideas in African feminism, motherism, Stiwanism, negofeminism, femalism, transnational feminism, and Africana womanism.

==== Social constructionist ideologies ====
In the late 20th century various feminists began to argue that gender roles are socially constructed, and that it is impossible to generalize women's experiences across cultures and histories. Post-structural feminism draws on the philosophies of post-structuralism and deconstruction in order to argue that the concept of gender is created socially and culturally through discourse. Postmodern feminists also emphasize the social construction of gender and the discursive nature of reality; however, as Pamela Abbott et al. write, a postmodern approach to feminism highlights "the existence of multiple truths (rather than simply men and women's standpoints)".

==== Transgender people ====
Third-wave feminists tend to view the struggle for trans rights as an integral part of intersectional feminism. Fourth-wave feminists also tend to be trans-inclusive. The American National Organization for Women (NOW) president Terry O'Neill said the struggle against transphobia is a feminist issue and NOW has affirmed that "trans women are women, trans girls are girls." Several studies have found that people who identify as feminists tend to be more accepting of trans people than those who do not.

An ideology variously known as trans-exclusionary radical feminism (or its acronym, TERF) or gender-critical feminism is critical of concepts of gender identity and transgender rights, holding that biological sex characteristics are an immutable determination of gender or supersede the importance of gender identity, that trans women are not women, and that trans men are not men. These views have been described as transphobic by many other feminists.

==== Cultural movements ====
Riot grrrls took an anti-corporate stance of self-sufficiency and self-reliance. Riot grrrl's emphasis on universal female identity and separatism often appears more closely allied with second-wave feminism than with the third wave. The movement encouraged and made "adolescent girls' standpoints central", allowing them to express themselves fully. Lipstick feminism is a cultural feminist movement that attempts to respond to the backlash of second-wave radical feminism of the 1960s and 1970s by reclaiming symbols of "feminine" identity such as make-up, suggestive clothing and having a sexual allure as valid and empowering personal choices.

== Demographics ==
According to 2014 Ipsos poll covering 15 developed countries, 53 percent of respondents identified as feminists, and 87 percent agreed that "women should be treated equally to men in all areas based on their competency, not their gender". However, only 55 percent of women agreed that they have "full equality with men and the freedom to reach their full dreams and aspirations". Taken together, these studies reflect the importance differentiating between claiming a "feminist identity" and holding "feminist attitudes or beliefs".

According to a 2015 poll, 18 percent of Americans use the label of "feminist" to describe themselves, while 85 percent are feminists in practice as they reported they believe in "equality for women". The poll found that 52 percent did not identify as feminist, 26 percent were unsure, and 4 percent provided no response.

Sociological research shows that, in the US, increased educational attainment is associated with greater support for feminist issues. In addition, politically liberal people are more likely to support feminist ideals compared to those who are conservative.

According to a 2016 Survation poll for the Fawcett Society, 7 percent of Britons use the label of "feminist" to describe themselves, while 83 percent say they support equality of opportunity for women – this included higher support from men (86%) than women (81%).

== Sexuality ==
Feminist views on sexuality vary, and have differed by historical period and by cultural context. Feminist attitudes to female sexuality have taken a few different directions. Matters such as the sex industry, sexual representation in the media, and issues regarding consent to sex under conditions of male dominance have been particularly controversial among feminists. This debate has culminated in the late 1970s and the 1980s, in what came to be known as the feminist sex wars, which pitted anti-pornography feminism against sex-positive feminism, and parts of the feminist movement were deeply divided by these debates. Feminists have taken a variety of positions on different aspects of the sexual revolution from the 1960s and 70s. Over the course of the 1970s, a large number of influential women accepted lesbian and bisexual women as part of feminism. In heterosexual dating feminists have recognized gendered dating norms as unjust and feminist women have shifted towards initiating and taking the first steps during dating.

=== Sex industry ===
Opinions on the sex industry are diverse. Feminists who are critical of the sex industry generally see it as the exploitative result of patriarchal social structures which reinforce sexual and cultural attitudes complicit in rape and sexual harassment. Alternately, feminists who support at least part of the sex industry argue that it can be a medium of feminist expression and reflect a woman's right to control and define her own sexuality.

Feminist views of pornography range from condemnation of pornography as a form of violence against women, to an embracing of some forms of pornography as a medium of feminist expression and a legitimate career. Similarly, feminists' views on prostitution vary, ranging from critical to supportive.

=== Affirming female sexual autonomy ===
For feminists, a woman's right to control her own sexuality is a key issue and one that is heavily contested between different branches of feminism. Radical feminists such as Catharine MacKinnon argue that women have very little control over their own bodies, with female sexuality being largely controlled and defined by men in patriarchal societies. Radical feminists argue that sexual violence committed by men is often rooted in ideologies of male sexual entitlement and that these systems grant women very few legitimate options to refuse sexual advances. Some radical feminists have argued that women should not engage in heterosexual sex, and choose lesbianism as a lifestyle and political choice, a view that has fallen out of favor, as sexuality is seen as largely biologically influenced rather than a choice one can make for political reasons.

Some radical feminists argue that all cultures are, in one way or another, dominated by ideologies that deny women's right to sexual expression, because men under a patriarchy define sex on their own terms. This entitlement can take different forms, depending on the culture. In some conservative and religious cultures marriage is regarded as an institution which requires a wife to be sexually available at all times, virtually without limit; thus, forcing or coercing sex on a wife is not considered a crime or even an abusive behaviour.

In 1968, radical feminist Anne Koedt argued in her essay The Myth of the Vaginal Orgasm that women's biology and the clitoral orgasm had not been properly analyzed and popularized, because men "have orgasms essentially by friction with the vagina" and not the clitoral area.

Other branches of feminism such as individualist feminism consider themselves sex-positive, and see women's expression of their own sexuality as a right. In this view, what is or is not "degrading" is subjective, and each person has a right to decide for themselves what sexual acts they find degrading and if they want to participate in them or not. Individualist feminist, Wendy McElroy wrote in her book, XXX: A Woman's Right to Pornography, "let's examine [...] the idea that pornography is degrading to women. Degrading is a subjective term. Personally, I find detergent commercials in which women become orgasmic over soapsuds to be tremendously degrading to women. I find movies in which prostitutes are treated like ignorant drug addicts to be slander against women. Every woman has the right—the need!—to define degradation for herself."

According to this view, part of sexual autonomy is the right to define one's boundaries, desires and limits around their sexuality rather than accept a narrative in which all women are victims of men during a sex act.

== Science ==
Sandra Harding says that the "moral and political insights of the women's movement have inspired social scientists and biologists to raise critical questions about the ways traditional researchers have explained gender, sex and relations within and between the social and natural worlds." Some feminists, such as Ruth Hubbard and Evelyn Fox Keller, criticize traditional scientific discourse as being historically biased towards a male perspective. A part of the feminist research agenda is the examination of the ways in which power inequities are created or reinforced in scientific and academic institutions. Physicist Lisa Randall, appointed to a task force at Harvard by then-president Lawrence Summers after his controversial discussion of why women may be underrepresented in science and engineering, said, "I just want to see a whole bunch more women enter the field so these issues don't have to come up anymore."

Lynn Hankinson Nelson writes that feminist empiricists find fundamental differences between the experiences of men and women. Thus, they seek to obtain knowledge through the examination of the experiences of women and to "uncover the consequences of omitting, misdescribing, or devaluing them" to account for a range of human experience. Another part of the feminist research agenda is the uncovering of ways in which power inequities are created or reinforced in society and in scientific and academic institutions. Furthermore, despite calls for greater attention to be paid to structures of gender inequity in the academic literature, structural analyses of gender bias rarely appear in highly cited psychological journals, especially in the commonly studied areas of psychology and personality.

One criticism of feminist epistemology is that it allows social and political values to influence its findings. Susan Haack also points out that feminist epistemology reinforces traditional stereotypes about women's thinking (as intuitive and emotional, etc.); Meera Nanda further cautions that this may in fact trap women within "traditional gender roles and help justify patriarchy".

=== Biology and gender ===
Modern feminism challenges the essentialist view of gender as biologically intrinsic. For example, Anne Fausto-Sterling's book, Myths of Gender, explores the assumptions embodied in scientific research that support a biologically essentialist view of gender. In Delusions of Gender, Cordelia Fine disputes scientific evidence that suggests that there is an innate biological difference between men's and women's minds, asserting instead that cultural and societal beliefs are the reason for differences between individuals that are commonly perceived as sex differences.

=== Feminist psychology ===
Feminism in psychology emerged as a critique of the dominant male outlook on psychological research where only male perspectives were studied with all male subjects. As women earned doctorates in psychology, women and their issues were introduced as legitimate topics of study. Feminist psychology emphasizes social context, lived experience, and qualitative analysis. Projects such as Psychology's Feminist Voices have emerged to catalogue the influence of feminist psychologists on the discipline.

== Culture ==
=== Design ===
There is a long history of feminist activity in design disciplines like industrial design, graphic design, and fashion design. This work has explored topics like beauty, DIY, feminine approaches to design and community-based projects. Some iconic writing includes Cheryl Buckley's essays on design and patriarchy and Joan Rothschild's Design and Feminism: Re-Visioning Spaces, Places, and Everyday Things. More recently, Isabel Prochner's research explored how feminist perspectives can support positive change in industrial design, helping to identify systemic social problems and inequities in design and guiding socially sustainable and grassroots design solutions.

=== Businesses ===
Feminist activists have established a range of feminist businesses, including feminist bookstores, credit unions, presses, mail-order catalogs, and restaurants. These businesses flourished as part of the second and third waves of feminism in the 1970s, 1980s, and 1990s.

=== Visual arts ===
Corresponding with general developments within feminism, and often including such self-organizing tactics as the consciousness-raising group, the movement began in the 1960s and flourished throughout the 1970s. Jeremy Strick, director of the Museum of Contemporary Art in Los Angeles, described the feminist art movement as "the most influential international movement of any during the postwar period", and Peggy Phelan says that it "brought about the most far-reaching transformations in both artmaking and art writing over the past four decades". Feminist artist Judy Chicago, who created The Dinner Party, a set of vulva-themed ceramic plates in the 1970s, said in 2009 to ARTnews, "There is still an institutional lag and an insistence on a male Eurocentric narrative. We are trying to change the future: to get girls and boys to realize that women's art is not an exception—it's a normal part of art history." A feminist approach to the visual arts has most recently developed through cyberfeminism and the posthuman turn, giving voice to the ways "contemporary female artists are dealing with gender, social media and the notion of embodiment".

=== Literature ===
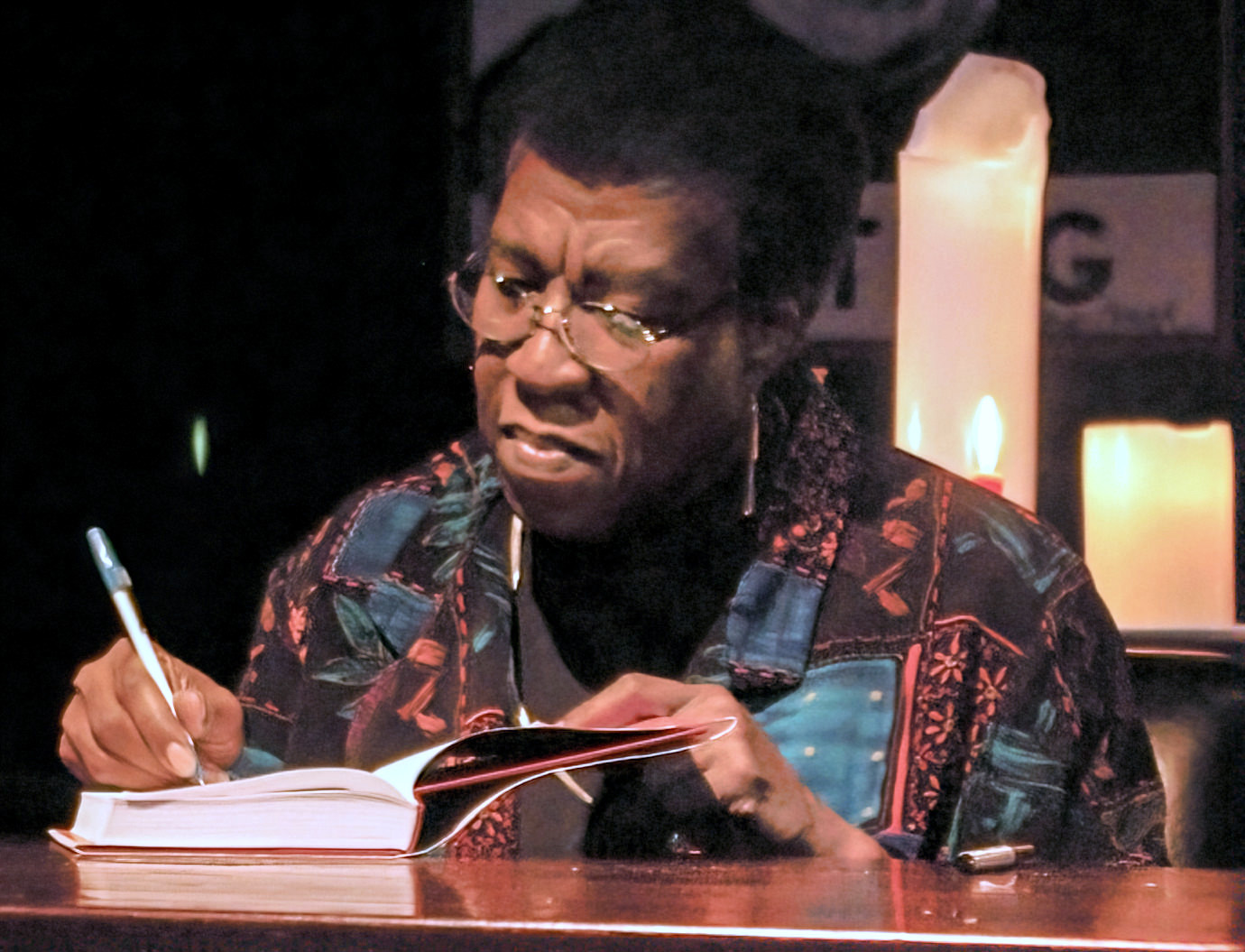
Octavia Butler, award-winning feminist science fiction author

The feminist movement produced feminist fiction, feminist non-fiction, and feminist poetry, which created new interest in women's writing. It also prompted a general reevaluation of women's historical and academic contributions in response to the belief that women's lives and contributions have been underrepresented as areas of scholarly interest. There has also been a close link between feminist literature and activism, with feminist writing typically voicing key concerns or ideas of feminism in a particular era.

Much of the early period of feminist literary scholarship was given over to the rediscovery and reclamation of texts written by women. In Western feminist literary scholarship, Studies like Dale Spender's Mothers of the Novel (1986) and Jane Spencer's The Rise of the Woman Novelist (1986) were ground-breaking in their insistence that women have always been writing.

Commensurate with this growth in scholarly interest, various presses began the task of reissuing long-out-of-print texts. Virago Press began to publish its large list of 19th- and early-20th-century novels in 1975 and became one of the first commercial presses to join in the project of reclamation. In the 1980s, Pandora Press, responsible for publishing Spender's study, issued a companion line of 18th-century novels written by women. More recently, Broadview Press continues to issue 18th- and 19th-century novels, many hitherto out of print, and the University of Kentucky has a series of republications of early women's novels.

Particular works of literature have come to be known as key feminist texts. A Vindication of the Rights of Woman (1792) by Mary Wollstonecraft, is one of the earliest works of feminist philosophy. A Room of One's Own (1929) by Virginia Woolf, is noted in its argument for both a literal and figural space for women writers within a literary tradition dominated by patriarchy.

The widespread interest in women's writing is related to a general reassessment and expansion of the literary canon. Interest in post-colonial literatures, gay and lesbian literature, writing by people of colour, working people's writing, and the cultural productions of other historically marginalized groups has resulted in a whole scale expansion of what is considered "literature", and genres hitherto not regarded as "literary", such as children's writing, journals, letters, travel writing, and many others are now the subjects of scholarly interest. Most genres and subgenres have undergone a similar analysis, so literary studies have entered new territories such as the "female gothic" or women's science fiction.

According to Elyce Rae Helford, "Science fiction and fantasy serve as important vehicles for feminist thought, particularly as bridges between theory and practice." Feminist science fiction is sometimes taught at the university level to explore the role of social constructs in understanding gender. Notable texts of this kind are Ursula K. Le Guin's The Left Hand of Darkness (1969), Joanna Russ' The Female Man (1970), Octavia Butler's Kindred (1979) and Margaret Atwood's Handmaid's Tale (1985).

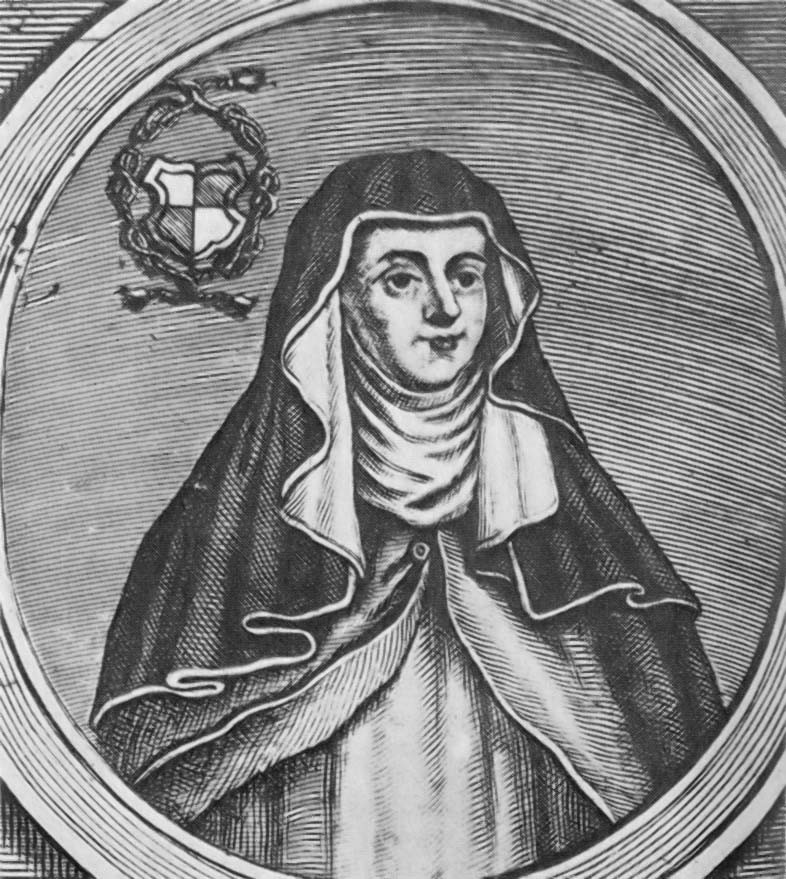
Hrotsvitha, first female writer from the Germanosphere, first female historian and first feminist playwright

Feminist nonfiction has played an important role in voicing concerns about women's lived experiences. For example, Maya Angelou's I Know Why the Caged Bird Sings was extremely influential, as it represented the specific racism and sexism experienced by black women growing up in the United States.

In addition, many feminist movements have embraced poetry as a vehicle through which to communicate feminist ideas to public audiences through anthologies, poetry collections, and public readings.

Moreover, historical pieces of writing by women have been used by feminists to speak about what women's lives were like in the past while demonstrating the power that they held and the impact they had in their communities. An important figure in the history of women's literature is Hrotsvitha (c. 935–973), a canoness who was an early female poet in the German lands. As a historian, Hrotsvitha is one of the few writers to address women's lives from a woman's perspective during the Middle Ages. Hrotsvitha's six short dramas are considered to be her magnum opus. She has been called "the most remarkable woman of her time" and an important figure in the history of women.

=== Music ===
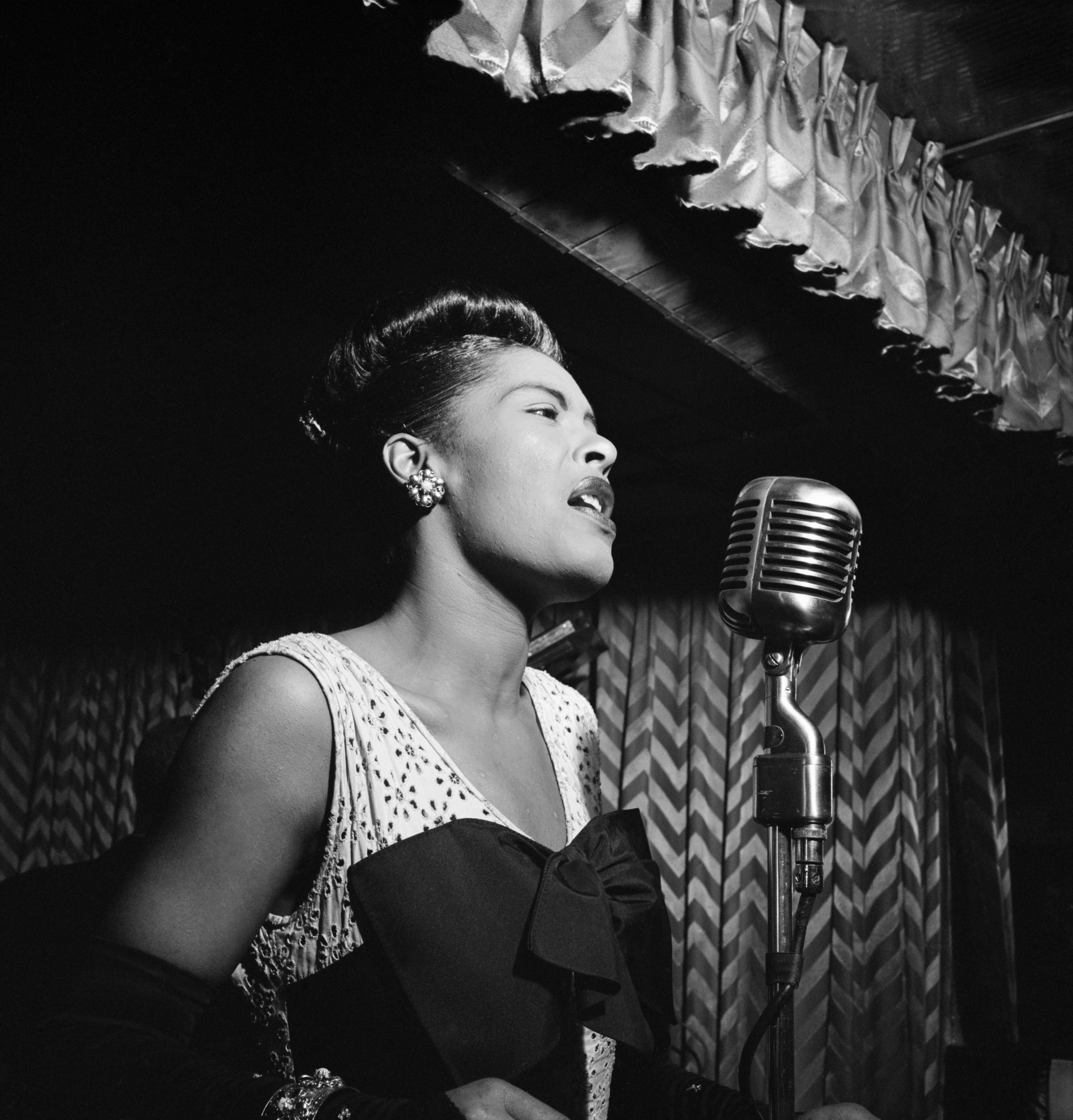
American jazz singer and songwriter Billie Holiday in New York City in 1947

Women's music (or womyn's music or wimmin's music) is the music by women, for women, and about women. The genre emerged as a musical expression of the second-wave feminist movement as well as the labour, civil rights, and peace movements. The movement was started by lesbians such as Cris Williamson, Meg Christian, and Margie Adam, African-American women activists such as Bernice Johnson Reagon and her group Sweet Honey in the Rock, and peace activist Holly Near. Women's music also refers to the wider industry of women's music that goes beyond the performing artists to include studio musicians, producers, sound engineers, technicians, cover artists, distributors, promoters, and festival organizers who are also women.

Feminism became a principal concern of musicologists in the 1980s as part of the New Musicology. Prior to this, in the 1970s, musicologists were beginning to discover women composers and performers, and had begun to review concepts of canon, genius, genre, and periodization from a feminist perspective. In other words, the question of how women musicians fit into traditional music history was now being asked. Through the 1980s and 1990s, this trend continued as musicologists like Susan McClary, Marcia Citron, and Ruth Solie began to consider the cultural reasons for the marginalizing of women from the received body of work. Concepts such as music as gendered discourse; professionalism; reception of women's music; examination of the sites of music production; relative wealth and education of women; popular music studies in relation to women's identity; patriarchal ideas in music analysis; and notions of gender and difference are among the themes examined during this time.

While the music industry has long been open to having women in performance or entertainment roles, women are much less likely to have positions of authority, such as being the leader of an orchestra. In popular music, while there are many women singers recording songs, there are very few women behind the audio console acting as music producers, the individuals who direct and manage the recording process.

=== Cinema ===
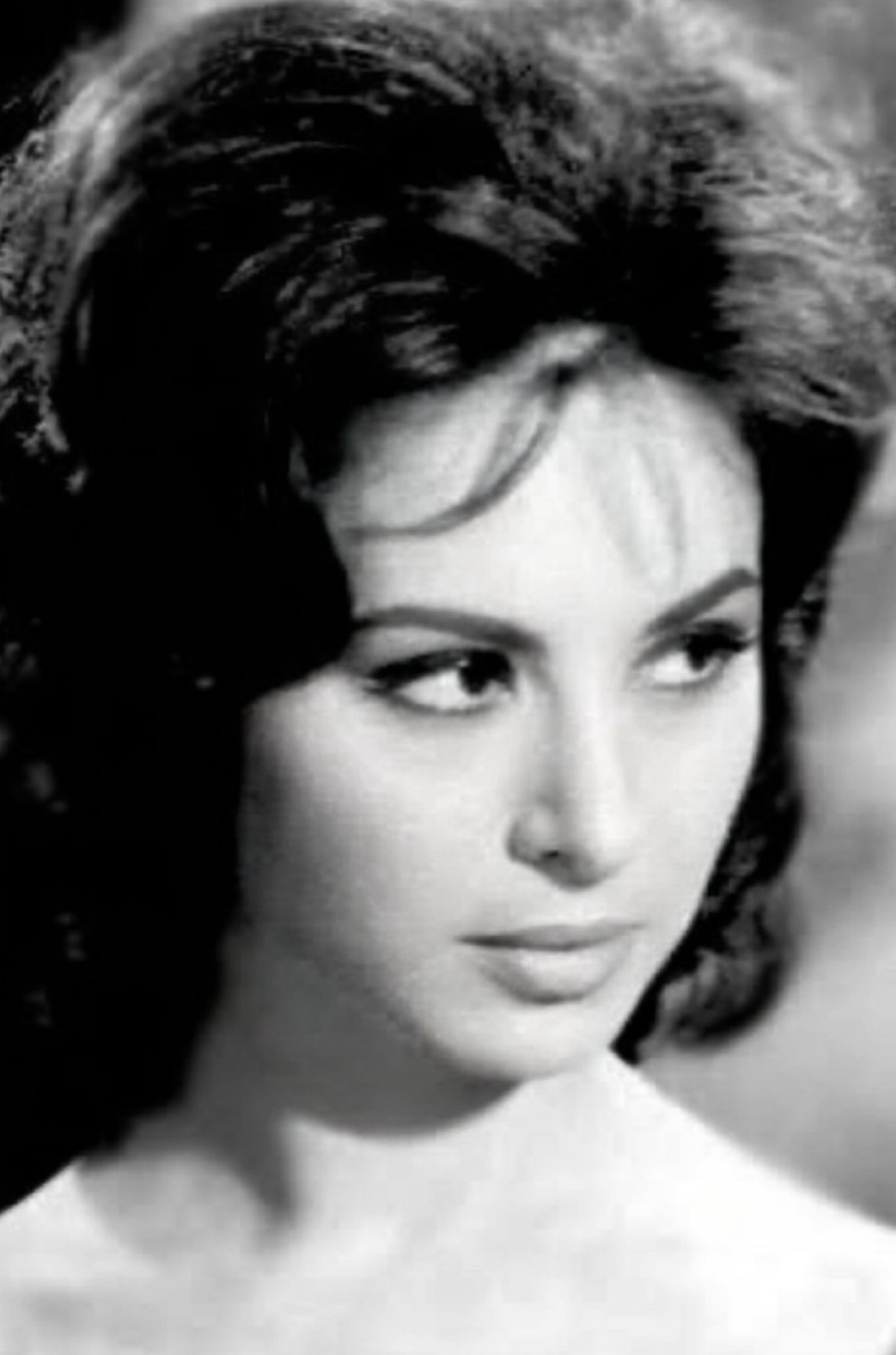
Faten Hamama (1931–2015), Egyptian film legend, inspired women all over the Middle East and Africa.

Feminist cinema, advocating or illustrating feminist perspectives, arose largely with the development of feminist film theory in the late 1960s and early 1970s. Women who were radicalized during the 1960s by political debate and sexual liberation; but the failure of radicalism to produce substantive change for women galvanized them to form consciousness-raising groups and set about analysing, from different perspectives, dominant cinema's construction of women. 1972 saw the first feminist film festivals in the U.S. and U.K. as well as the first feminist film journal, Women & Film. Trailblazers from this period included Claire Johnston and Laura Mulvey, who also organized the Women's Event at the Edinburgh Film Festival. Other theorists making a powerful impact on feminist film include Teresa de Lauretis, Anneke Smelik and Kaja Silverman. Approaches in philosophy and psychoanalysis fuelled feminist film criticism, feminist independent film and feminist distribution.

It has been argued that there are two distinct approaches to independent, theoretically inspired feminist filmmaking. 'Deconstruction' concerns itself with analysing and breaking down codes of mainstream cinema, aiming to create a different relationship between the spectator and dominant cinema. The second approach, a feminist counterculture, embodies feminine writing to investigate a specifically feminine cinematic language. Bracha L. Ettinger invented a field of notions and concepts that serve the research of cinema from feminine perspective: The Matrixial Gaze. Ettinger's language include original concepts to discover feminine perspectives. Many writers in the fields of film theory and contemporary art are using the Ettingerian matrixial sphere (matricial sphere).

During the 1930s–1950s heyday of the big Hollywood studios, the status of women in the industry was abysmal. Since then female directors such as Sally Potter, Catherine Breillat, Claire Denis and Jane Campion have made art movies, and directors like Kathryn Bigelow and Patty Jenkins have had mainstream success. This progress stagnated in the 1990s, and men outnumber women five to one in behind the camera roles.

== Politics ==
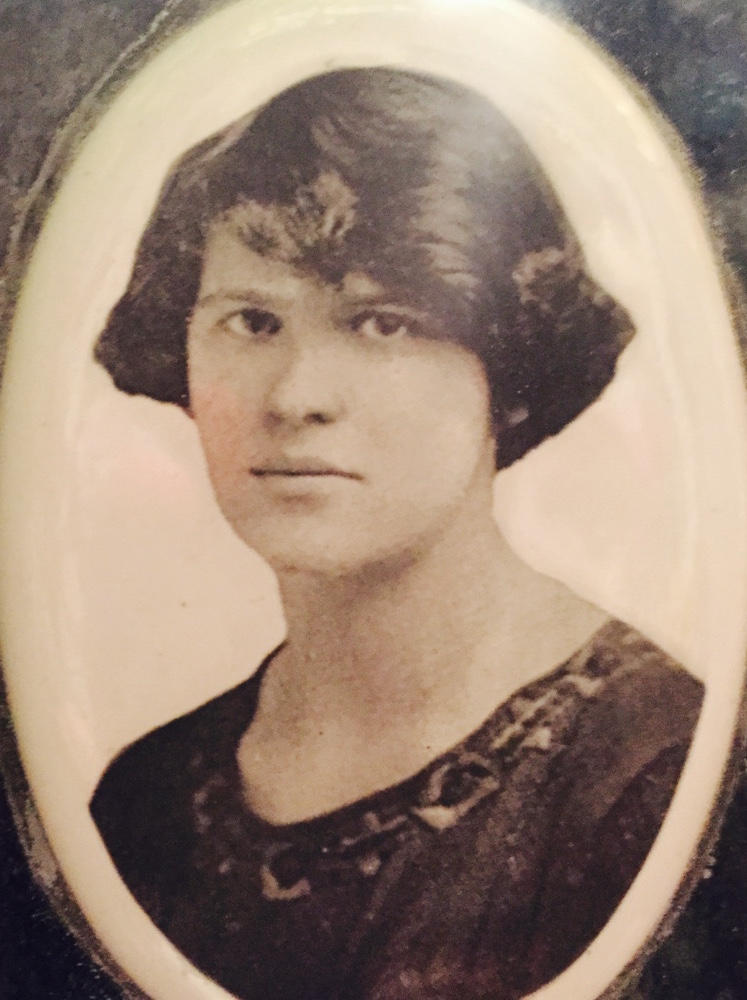
British-born suffragist Rose Cohen was executed in Stalin's Great Terror in 1937, two months after the execution of her Soviet husband.

Feminism had complex interactions with the major political movements of the 20th century.

=== Socialism ===
Since the late 19th century, some feminists have allied with socialism, whereas others have criticized socialist ideology for being insufficiently concerned about women's rights. August Bebel, an early activist of the German Social Democratic Party (SPD), published his work Die Frau und der Sozialismus, juxtaposing the struggle for equal rights between sexes with social equality in general. In 1907 there was an International Conference of Socialist Women in Stuttgart where suffrage was described as a tool of class struggle. Clara Zetkin of the SPD called for women's suffrage to build a "socialist order, the only one that allows for a radical solution to the women's question".

In Britain, the women's movement was allied with the Labour party. In the U.S., Betty Friedan emerged from a radical background to take leadership. Radical Women is the oldest socialist feminist organization in the U.S. and is still active. During the Spanish Civil War, Dolores Ibárruri (La Pasionaria) led the Communist Party of Spain. Although she supported equal rights for women, she opposed women fighting on the front and clashed with the anarcha-feminist Mujeres Libres.

Feminists in Ireland in the early 20th century included the revolutionary Irish Republican, suffragette and socialist Constance Markievicz, who in 1918 was the first woman elected to the British House of Commons. However, in line with Sinn Féin abstentionist policy, she would not take her seat in the House of Commons. She was re-elected to the Second Dáil in the elections of 1921. She was also a commander of the Irish Citizens Army, which was led by the socialist and self-described feminist Irish leader James Connolly, during the 1916 Easter Rising.

=== Fascism ===
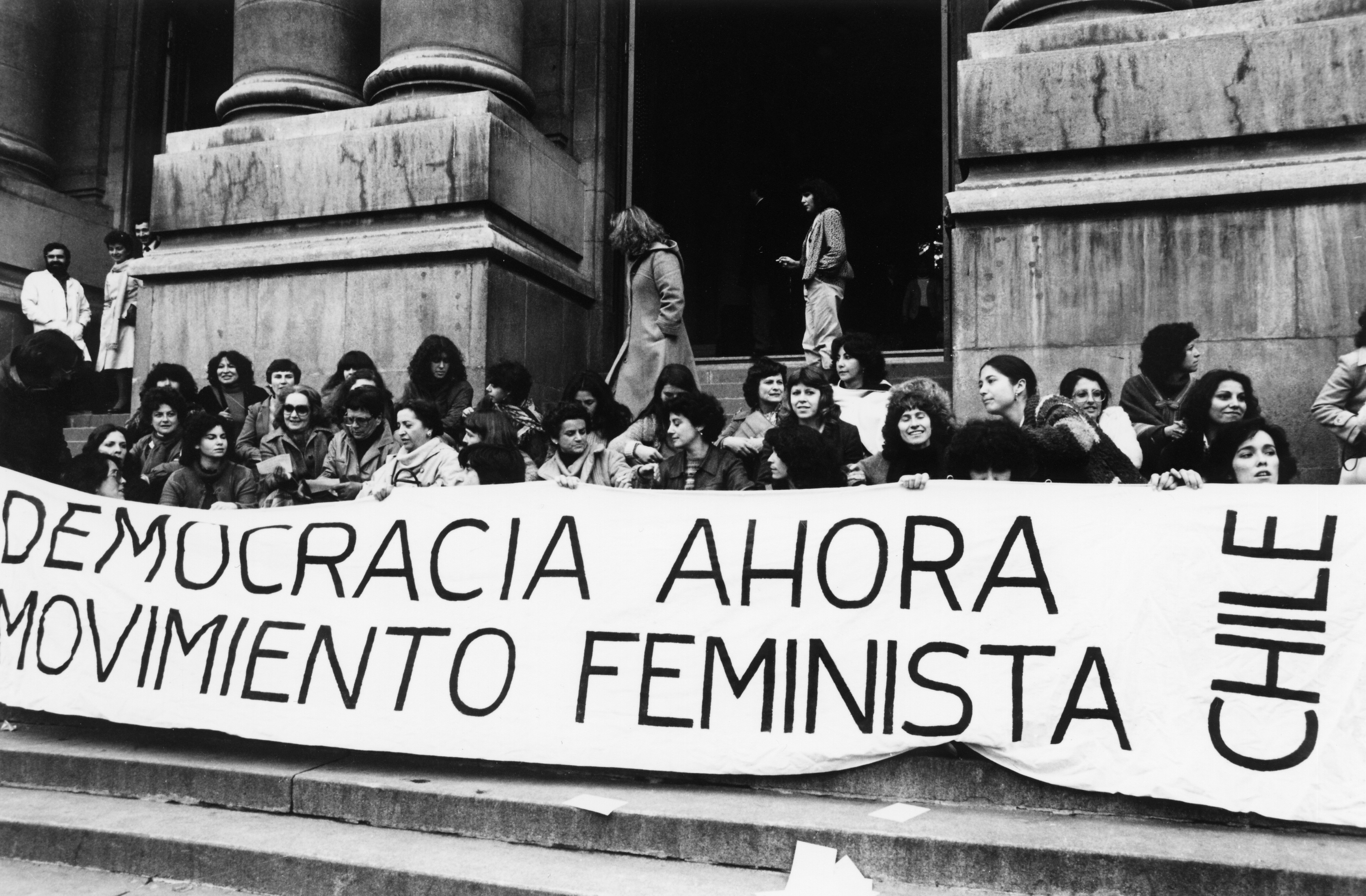
Chilean feminists protest against the regime of Augusto Pinochet.

Fascism has been prescribed dubious stances on feminism by its practitioners and by women's groups. Amongst other demands concerning social reform presented in the Fascist manifesto in 1919 was expanding the suffrage to all Italian citizens of age 18 and above, including women (accomplished only in 1946, after the defeat of fascism) and eligibility for all to stand for office from age 25. This demand was particularly championed by special Fascist women's auxiliary groups such as the fasci femminilli and only partly realized in 1925, under pressure from dictator Benito Mussolini's more conservative coalition partners.

Cyprian Blamires states that although feminists were among those who opposed the rise of Adolf Hitler, feminism has a complicated relationship with the Nazi movement as well. While Nazis glorified traditional notions of patriarchal society and its role for women, they claimed to recognize women's equality in employment. However, Hitler and Mussolini declared themselves as opposed to feminism, and after the rise of Nazism in Germany in 1933, there was a rapid dissolution of the political rights and economic opportunities that feminists had fought for during the pre-war period and to some extent during the 1920s. Georges Duby et al. write that in practice fascist society was hierarchical and emphasized male virility, with women maintaining a largely subordinate position. Blamires also writes that neofascism has since the 1960s been hostile towards feminism and advocates that women accept "their traditional roles".

=== Civil rights movement and anti-racism ===
The civil rights movement has influenced and informed the feminist movement and vice versa. Many American feminists adapted the language and theories of black equality activism and drew parallels between women's rights and the rights of non-white people. Despite the connections between the women's and civil rights movements, some tensions arose during the late 1960s and the 1970s as non-white women argued that feminism was predominantly white, straight, and middle class, and did not understand and was not concerned with issues of race and sexuality. Similarly, some women argued that the civil rights movement had sexist and homophobic elements and did not adequately address minority women's concerns. These criticisms created new feminist social theories about identity politics and the intersections of racism, classism, and sexism; they also generated new feminisms such as black feminism and Chicana feminism in addition to making large contributions to lesbian feminism and other integrations of queer of color identity.

=== Neoliberalism ===
Neoliberalism has been criticized by feminist theory for having a negative effect on the female workforce population across the globe, especially in the global south. Masculinist assumptions and objectives continue to dominate economic and geopolitical thinking. Women's experiences in non-industrialized countries reveal often deleterious effects of modernization policies and undercut orthodox claims that development benefits everyone.

Proponents of neoliberalism have theorized that by increasing women's participation in the workforce, there will be heightened economic progress, but feminist critics have stated that this participation alone does not further equality in gender relations. Neoliberalism has failed to address significant problems such as the devaluation of feminized labor, the structural privileging of men and masculinity, and the politicization of women's subordination in the family and the workplace. The "feminization of employment" refers to a conceptual characterization of deteriorated and devalorized labor conditions that are less desirable, meaningful, safe, and secure. Employers in the global south have perceptions about feminine labor and seek workers who are perceived to be undemanding, docile and willing to accept low wages. Social constructs about feminized labor have played a big part in this, for instance, employers often perpetuate ideas about women as "secondary" income earners to justify their lower rates of pay and not deserving of training or promotion.

== Societal impact ==
The feminist movement has effected change in Western society, including women's suffrage; greater access to education; more equal payment to men; the right to initiate divorce proceedings; the right of women to make individual decisions regarding pregnancy (including access to contraceptives and abortion); and the right to own property.

=== Civil rights ===
Participation in the Convention on the Elimination of All Forms of Discrimination Against Women: Signed and ratified Acceded or succeeded Unrecognized state, abiding by treaty Only signed Non-signatory

From the 1960s on, the campaign for women's rights was met with mixed results in the U.S. and the U.K. Other countries of the EEC agreed to ensure that discriminatory laws would be phased out across the European Community.

Some feminist campaigning also helped reform attitudes to child sexual abuse. The view that young girls cause men to have sexual intercourse with them was replaced by that of men's responsibility for their own conduct, the men being adults.

In the U.S., the National Organization for Women (NOW) began in 1966 to seek women's equality, including through the Equal Rights Amendment (ERA), which did not pass, although some states enacted their own. Reproductive rights in the U.S. centred on the court decision in Roe v. Wade enunciating a woman's right to choose whether to carry a pregnancy to term.

The division of labor within households was affected by the increased entry of women into workplaces in the 20th century. Sociologist Arlie Russell Hochschild found that, in two-career couples, men and women, on average, spend about equal amounts of time working, but women still spend more time on housework, although Cathy Young responded by arguing that women may prevent equal participation by men in housework and parenting. Judith K. Brown writes, "Women are most likely to make a substantial contribution when subsistence activities have the following characteristics: the participant is not obliged to be far from home; the tasks are relatively monotonous and do not require rapt concentration and the work is not dangerous, can be performed in spite of interruptions, and is easily resumed once interrupted."

In international law, the Convention on the Elimination of All Forms of Discrimination Against Women (CEDAW) is an international convention adopted by the United Nations General Assembly and described as an international bill of rights for women. It came into force in those nations ratifying it.

=== Jurisprudence ===
Feminist jurisprudence is a branch of jurisprudence that examines the relationship between women and law. It addresses questions about the history of legal and social biases against women and about the enhancement of their legal rights.

Feminist jurisprudence signifies a reaction to the philosophical approach of modern legal scholars, who typically see the law as a process for interpreting and perpetuating a society's universal, gender-neutral ideals. Feminist legal scholars claim that this fails to acknowledge women's values or legal interests or the harms that they may anticipate or experience.

=== Language ===
Proponents of gender-neutral language argue that the use of gender-specific language often implies male superiority or reflects an unequal state of society. According to The Handbook of English Linguistics, generic masculine pronouns and gender-specific job titles are instances "where English linguistic convention has historically treated men as prototypical of the human species."

Merriam-Webster chose "feminism" as its 2017 Word of the Year, noting that "Word of the Year is a quantitative measure of interest in a particular word."

=== Theology ===
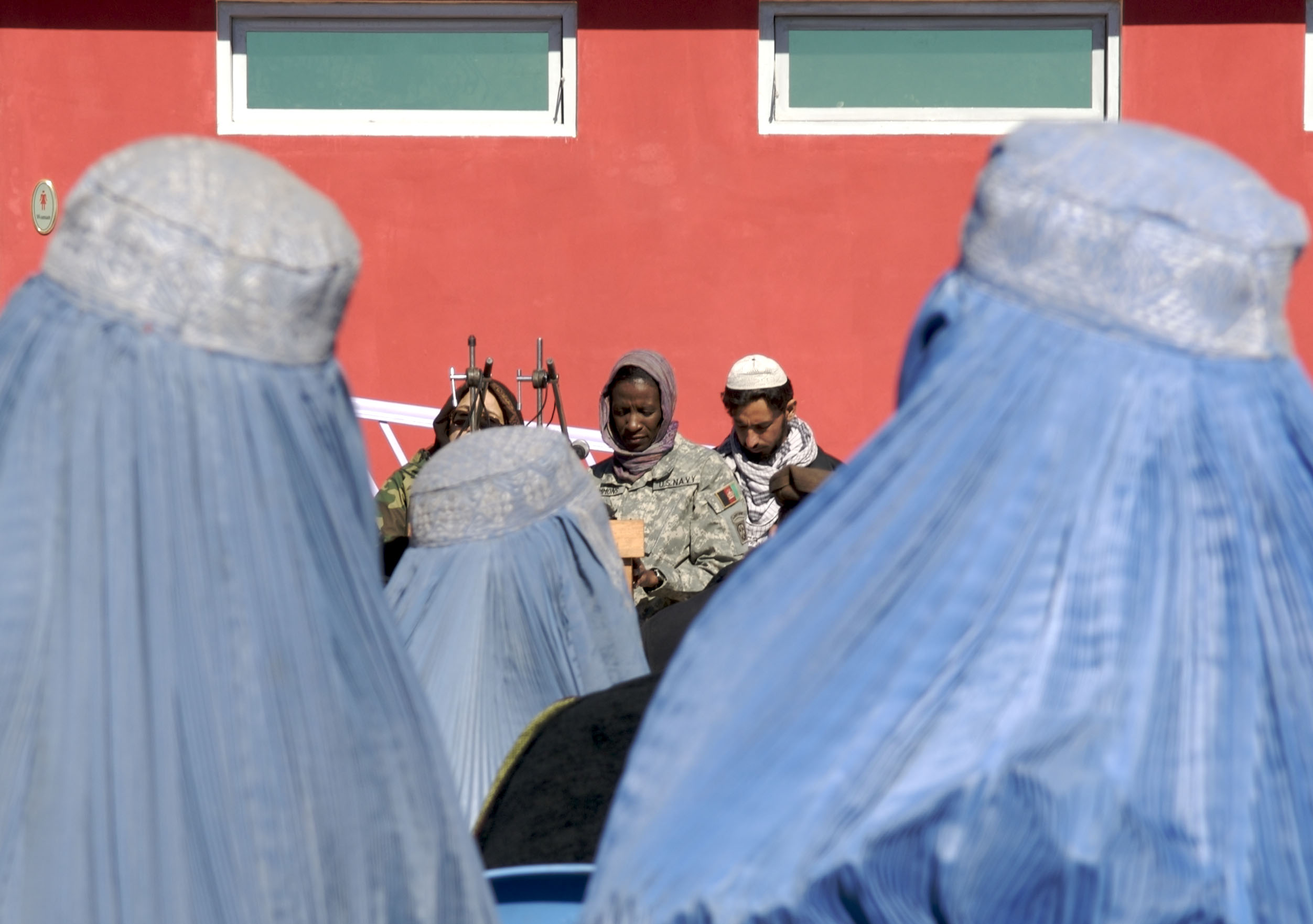
Cmdr. Adrienne Simmons speaking at the 2008 ceremony for the only women's mosque in Khost City, a symbol of progress for growing women's rights in the Pashtun belt

Feminist theology is a movement that reconsiders the traditions, practices, scriptures, and theologies of religions from a feminist perspective. Some of the goals of feminist theology include increasing the role of women among the clergy and religious authorities, reinterpreting male-dominated imagery and language about God, determining women's place in relation to career and motherhood, and studying images of women in the religion's sacred texts.

Christian feminism is a branch of feminist theology which seeks to interpret and understand Christianity in light of the equality of women and men, and that this interpretation is necessary for a complete understanding of Christianity. While there is no standard set of beliefs among Christian feminists, most agree that God does not discriminate on the basis of sex, and are involved in issues such as the ordination of women, male dominance, and the balance of parenting in Christian marriage, claims of moral deficiency and inferiority of women compared to men, and the overall treatment of women in the church.

Islamic feminists advocate women's rights, gender equality, and social justice grounded within an Islamic framework. Advocates seek to highlight the deeply rooted teachings of equality in the Quran and encourage a questioning of the patriarchal interpretation of Islamic teaching through the Quran, hadith (sayings of Muhammad), and sharia (law) towards the creation of a more equal and just society. Although rooted in Islam, the movement's pioneers have also used secular and Western feminist discourses and recognize the role of Islamic feminism as part of an integrated global feminist movement.

Buddhist feminism is a movement that seeks to improve the religious, legal, and social status of women within Buddhism. It is an aspect of feminist theology which seeks to advance and understand the equality of men and women morally, socially, spiritually, and in leadership from a Buddhist perspective. The Buddhist feminist Rita Gross describes Buddhist feminism as "the radical practice of the co-humanity of women and men".

Jewish feminism is a movement that seeks to improve the religious, legal, and social status of women within Judaism and to open up new opportunities for religious experience and leadership for Jewish women. The main issues for early Jewish feminists in these movements were the exclusion from the all-male prayer group or minyan, the exemption from positive time-bound mitzvot, and women's inability to function as witnesses and to initiate divorce. Many Jewish women have become leaders of feminist movements throughout their history.

Secular or atheist feminists have engaged in feminist criticism of religion, arguing that many religions have oppressive rules towards women and misogynistic themes and elements in religious texts.

=== Patriarchy ===
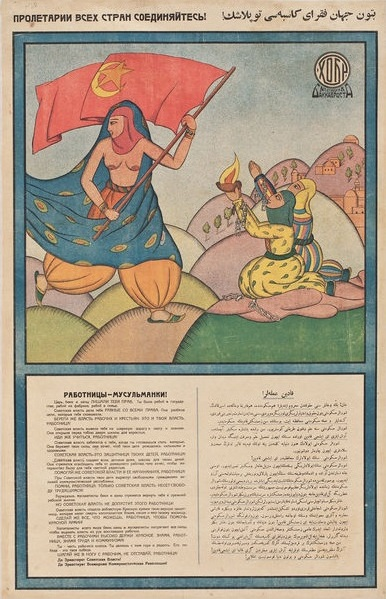
"Female Muslims- The tsar, beys and khans took your rights away" – Soviet poster issued in Azerbaijan, 1921

Patriarchy is a social system in which society is organized around male authority figures. In this system, fathers have authority over women, children, and property. It implies the institutions of male rule and privilege and is dependent on female subordination. Most forms of feminism characterize patriarchy as an unjust social system that is oppressive to women. Carole Pateman argues that the patriarchal distinction "between masculinity and femininity is the political difference between freedom and subjection." In feminist theory the concept of patriarchy often includes all the social mechanisms that reproduce and exert male dominance over women. Feminist theory typically characterizes patriarchy as a social construction, which can be overcome by revealing and critically analyzing its manifestations. Some radical feminists have proposed that because patriarchy is too deeply rooted in society, separatism is the only viable solution. Other feminists have criticized these views as being anti-men.

=== Men and masculinity ===
Feminist theory has explored the social construction of masculinity and its implications for the goal of gender equality. The social construct of masculinity is seen by feminism as problematic because it associates males with aggression and competition, and reinforces patriarchal and unequal gender relations. Patriarchal cultures are criticized for "limiting forms of masculinity" available to men and thus narrowing their life choices. Some feminists are engaged with men's issues activism, such as bringing attention to male rape and spousal battery and addressing negative social expectations for men.

Male participation in feminism is generally encouraged by feminists and is seen as an important strategy for achieving full societal commitment to gender equality. Many male feminists and pro-feminists are active in both women's rights activism, feminist theory, and masculinity studies. However, some argue that while male engagement with feminism is necessary, it is problematic because of the ingrained social influences of patriarchy in gender relations. The consensus today in feminist and masculinity theories is that men and women should cooperate to achieve the larger goals of feminism.

== Reactions ==
Different groups of people have responded to feminism, and both men and women have been among its supporters and critics. Among American university students, for both men and women, support for feminist ideas is more common than self-identification as a feminist. The US media tends to portray feminism negatively and feminists "are less often associated with day-to-day work/leisure activities of regular women". However, as recent research has demonstrated, as people are exposed to self-identified feminists and to discussions relating to various forms of feminism, their own self-identification with feminism increases.

=== Pro-feminism ===
Pro-feminism is the support of feminism without implying that the supporter is a member of the feminist movement. The term is most often used in reference to men who are actively supportive of feminism. The activities of pro-feminist men's groups include anti-violence work with boys and young men in schools, offering sexual harassment workshops in workplaces, running community education campaigns, and counselling male perpetrators of violence. Pro-feminist men also may be involved in men's health, activism against pornography including anti-pornography legislation, men's studies, and the development of gender equity curricula in schools. This work is sometimes in collaboration with feminists and women's services, such as domestic violence and rape crisis centres.

=== Criticism of feminism ===
Writers such as Camille Paglia, Christina Hoff Sommers, Jean Bethke Elshtain, Elizabeth Fox-Genovese, and Daphne Patai oppose some forms of feminism, though they identify as feminists. They argue, for example, that in some cases feminists promote misandry and elevate women's interests above men's, and criticize some feminist positions as harmful to both men and women. A meta-analysis in 2023 published in the journal Psychology of Women Quarterly investigated the stereotype of feminists' attitudes to men and concluded that feminist views of men were no different to that of non-feminists or men towards men and titled the phenomenon the misandry myth, based on "evidence that it is false and widespread".

=== Anti-feminism ===
Anti-feminism is opposition to feminism in some or all of its forms.

In the 19th century, anti-feminism was mainly focused on opposition to women's suffrage. Later, opponents of women's entry into institutions of higher learning argued that education was too great a physical burden on women. Other anti-feminists opposed women's entry into the labour force, or their right to join unions, to sit on juries, or to obtain birth control and control of their sexuality.

Some people have opposed feminism on the grounds that they believe it is contrary to traditional values or religious beliefs. Some anti-feminists argue, for example, that social acceptance of divorce and non-married women is wrong and harmful, and that men and women are fundamentally different and thus their different traditional roles in society should be maintained. Other anti-feminists oppose women's entry into the workforce, political office, and the voting process, as well as the lessening of male authority in families.

Daphne Patai and Noretta Koertge argue that the term "anti-feminist" is used to silence academic debate about feminism.

=== Secular humanism ===
Secular humanism is an ethical framework that attempts to dispense with any unreasoned dogma, pseudoscience, and superstition. Critics of feminism sometimes ask "Why feminism and not humanism?". Some humanists argue, however, that the goals of feminists and humanists largely overlap, and the distinction is only in motivation. For example, a humanist may consider abortion in terms of a utilitarian ethical framework, rather than considering the motivation of any particular woman in getting an abortion. In this respect, it is possible to be a humanist without being a feminist, but this does not preclude the existence of feminist humanism. Humanism played a significant role in protofeminism during the Renaissance period in such that humanists made educated women popular figures despite the challenge of the patriarchal organization of society.

== See also ==
- Decolonial feminism – School of thought
- Ecofeminism
- Feminist peace research
- Lesbian erasure – Act of minimizing lesbian representation
- Matrilineality – Tracing of kinship through the female line
- Men's rights movement – Anti-feminist movement
- Straw feminism – Distortion or fabrication of feminist arguments
- Ethiopian feminists facing digital gender-based violence
