= Women's Union (Liechtenstein) =

Women's wing of Liechtenstein's Patriotic Union

Women's Union Frauen-Union
- Founded: 22 March 1982; 44 years ago
- Ideology: Feminism
- National affiliation: Patriotic Union
- Colours: Red

Website
- www.vu-online.li/partei/unionen/frauenunion

Women's Union (German: Frauen-Union) is a section of the Patriotic Union that officially represents the women's wing of the party. It is a grassroots group which provides campaigning, training and support for women within the party, and also general women-specific issues and equal rights.

== History ==
The group was founded on 22 March 1982 as a result of increasing pressure to introduce women's suffrage to Liechtenstein. The Patriotic Union first supported its introduction in 1972, but a referendum on the topic was rejected by male-only voters in 1973. Following a successful referendum (among men only) in July 1984, women's suffrage was introduced to Liechtenstein.

== See also ==
- Patriotic Union
- Women's suffrage in Liechtenstein
