= Better Half =

Better Half, Better Halves, and derivatives thereof may refer to:

== Television and film ==
- The Better Half (TV series), a 2017 Philippine drama television series
- Better Halves (TV series), a TVB costume television series
- Better Half (2019 TV series), a 2019 Polish romantic comedy television series
- Better Half (2023 film), a 2023 comedy film written by Patrick Henry Phelan

=== Episodes ===
- "Better Half", a season-one episode of the American action crime drama television series Sons of Anarchy
- "Better Half", a season-eight episode of the American medical drama television series House
- "The Better Half", a season-six episode of the American period drama television series Mad Men
- "Better Halves", a season-one episode of the American superhero drama television series Heroes
- "Better Halves", a season-five episode of the American espionage television series Burn Notice

== Other uses ==
- The Better Half, an American comic strip created by Bob Barnes
- The Better Half (play), a one-act play by Noël Coward first performed in 1922
- Better Half VW, an American aircraft engine
- Better Halves (film), a 1916 American film featuring Oliver Hardy
- "You're My Better Half", a song co-written and recorded by Australian country music artist Keith Urban

== See also ==
- The Other Half (disambiguation)
- My Better Half (disambiguation)
- Ardhangini (disambiguation)
