= Komitée für das Frauenstimmrecht =

Women's rights organization in Liechtenstein

Komitée für das Frauenstimmrecht ("Committee for Women's Suffrage" ), was a women's rights organization in Liechtenstein, founded in 1969. It was the first women's suffrage organization in Liechtenstein, and one of the main organizations working to introduce Women's suffrage in Liechtenstein.

After the 1968 Liechtenstein referendums resulted in a defeat for the suggestion to introduce women's suffrage, the Komitée für das Frauenstimmrecht was founded to actively work for the issue. It was the first women's suffrage organization in the nation. It was founded on 7 November 1969.

It was founded by a group of women suffragists, among them Bernadette Brunhart and Elfriede Winiger, secretaries in the state administration. The Liechtenstein suffragists initially kept their distance from fighting in the style of the internationally known British suffragettes. The committee tried to promote a positive change through discussion evenings and active participation in the political parties.

Women's suffrage was finally approved in the 1984 Liechtenstein women's suffrage referendum.
