= Emma Brogle-Sele =

Liechtensteiner politician (born 1934)

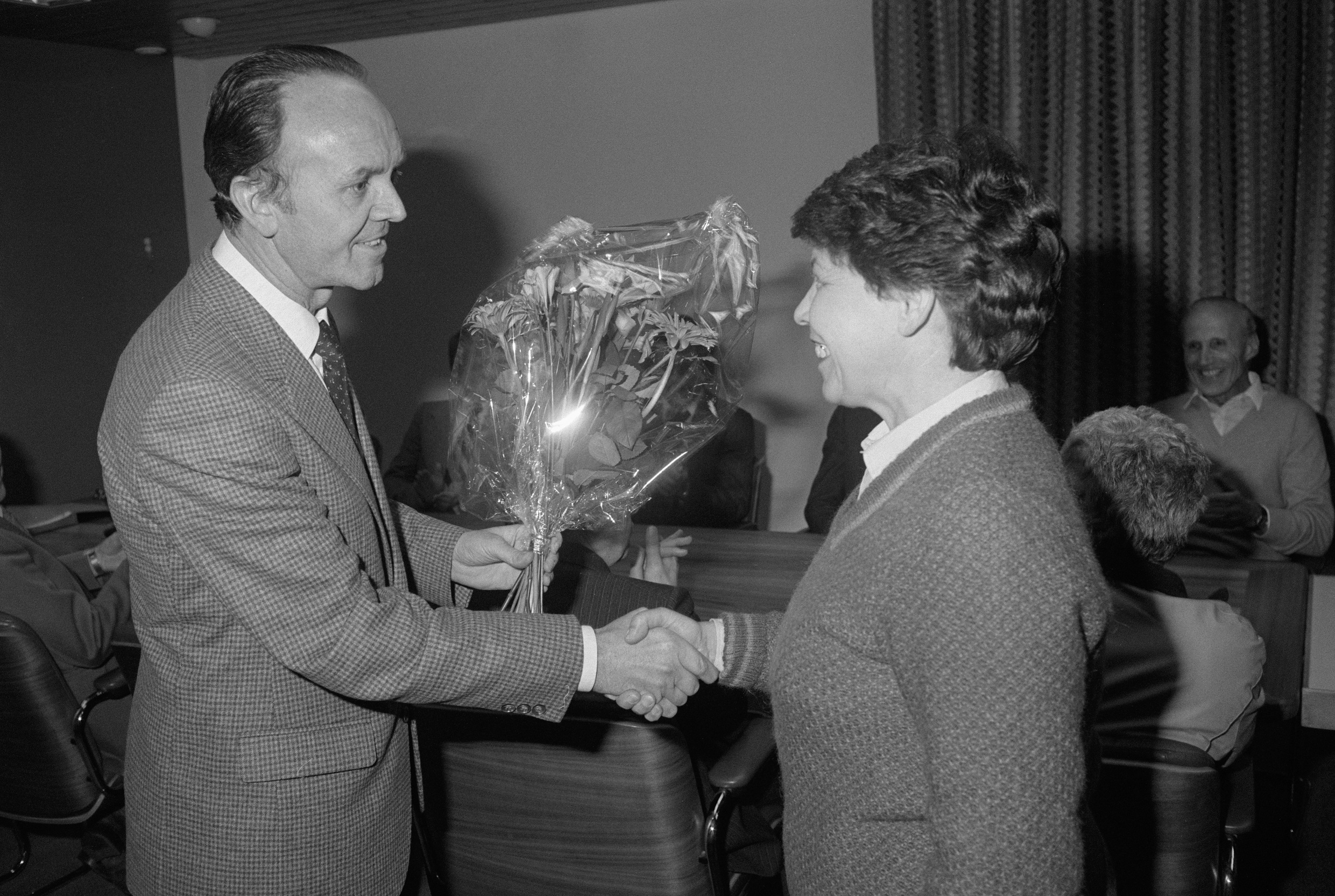
Brogle-Sele (right) being congratulated by Arthur Konrad for her election as the first female member of the Vaduz municipal council in 1983

Emma Brogle (née Sele. Born 13 October 1934) is a Liechtenstein politician and suffragist. She founded and chaired the Women's Union and in 1983 became the first female member of the Vaduz municipal council and one of the first female councillors in the country. She was also a deputy member of the Landtag of Liechtenstein.

== Early life ==
Brogle was born on 13 October 1934 in Vaduz, Liechtenstein as the daughter of politician Josef Sele.

She was able to study at a secondary school in her hometown between 1946 and 1950, in a context where girls rarely had the opportunity to do so. She was one of the first women to study at a vocational school and trained to be a saleswoman between 1950 and 1952.

In 1954, Brogle moved to London, where she worked as an au pair, and two years later she returned to Liechtenstein. She soon found work at the Vaduz Tourist Office, where her duties included being responsible for the Princely Collections.

After her husband's death in 1965, she had to look for work and found it at an international company.

== Career ==
After the introduction of municipal suffrage in 1976, Brogle became the first female member of the Vaduz municipal council as a member of the Patriotic Union, and also one of the first in the country, alongside Maria Marxer and Elsa Oehri. She held this office until 1991, also being deputy mayor of the municipality from 1987 and 1991 under mayor Arthur Konrad.

Brogle was also deputy member of the Landtag of Liechtenstein from 1986 and 1990 for Patriotic Union and substitute member of the delegation to the Parliamentary Assembly of the Council of Europe from 1986 and 1989, and president of the Women's Union from 1982 and 1988.

She was president of the Women's Union between 1982 and 1988. As president of the Union, she worked for the introduction of women's suffrage at the national level, which was achieved in 1984.

== Personal life ==
In 1957, she met her husband, Walter Brogle, a trained croupier, with whom she had two children. In 1965 Walter died due to an internal bleeding.

== Honors ==
- Liechtenstein: Commander's Cross of the Order of Merit of the Principality of Liechtenstein (1991)
