= The Other Half =

The Other Half may refer to:

== Film and television ==
- The Other Half (game show), a BBC television game show
- The Other Half (talk show), an American day-time talk show
- The Other Half (1919 film), a film directed by King Vidor
- The Other Half (2002 film), a documentary film by Isolde Marxer
- The Other Half (2006 Chinese film), a film directed by Ying Liang
- The Other Half (2016 film), a Canadian romance film

== Music ==
- The Other Half (band), an American psychedelic hard rock band, active in the 1960s
- The Other Half, a Canadian 2000s tour band started by Leslie Carter
- Other Half (album), a 2007 album by Mandy Chiang

== Other ==
- The Other Half, a replaceable back cover to the Jolla phone using I2C for expansion capabilities
- The Other Half : Poems, poetry collection by Judith Wright
