= Ardhangini =

Ardhangini (transl. better half) may refer to:

- Ardhangini (1959 film), an Indian Hindi-language film
- Ardhangini (2023 film), an Indian Bengali-language film
- Ardhangini – Ek Khoobsurat Jeevan Saathi, a 2007–2008 Indian Hindi-language television series which aired on Zee TV
- Ardhangini (2017 TV series), a 2017–2018 Indian Assamese-language television series which aired on Rang
- Ardhangini (2018 TV series), a 2018 Indian Bengali-language television series airing on Star Jalsha

== See also ==
- Better Half (disambiguation)
