= The Other Half (2002 film) =

2002 Liechtenstein documentary film

- Directed by: Isolde Marxer
- Written by: Isolde Marxer
- Cinematography: Hansueli Schenkel
- Edited by: Isolde Marxer; Fee Liechti; Eva von Wartburg
- Music by: Markus Gsell; Roland Christen
- Production company: Verein Bildungsarbeit für Frauen
- Release date: June 2002 (Liechtenstein)
- Running time: 120 minutes
- Countries: Liechtenstein, Switzerland
- Language: German

The Other Half (German: Die andere Hälfte) is a 2002 Liechtenstein documentary film directed by Isolde Marxer. It documents the push for women's suffrage in Liechtenstein and the accounts of people involved.

The documentary was commissioned by the Liechtenstein Association for Educational Work for Women and was theatrically released in Schaan in 2002. It was shown at the Solothurn Film Festival in 2003 and also shown on Swiss television. In 2024, on the 40th anniversary on women gaining the right to vote in Liechtenstein, the documentary was broadcast on 1FLTV.
