= 1984 Liechtenstein women's suffrage referendum =

- 1 July 1984

Results
Choice	Votes	%
Yes	2,370	51.29%
No	2,251	48.71%
Valid votes	4,621	98.28%
Invalid or blank votes	81	1.72%
Total votes	4,702	100.00%
Registered voters/turnout	5,453	86.23%

A referendum on the introduction of women's suffrage in national elections was held in Liechtenstein on 1 July 1984. Following the introduction of female suffrage in neighbouring Switzerland at the federal level after a referendum in 1971 (although women had had the right to vote in many cantons and municipalities before this), Liechtenstein had been the only remaining European country to deny women the right to vote. Referendums had been held in 1968, 1971 and 1973 (the latter two limited to men), but on each occasion men had rejected its introduction, despite the support of newspapers and both major political parties. Nevertheless, some municipalities had since introduced female suffrage at a local level, starting with Vaduz in 1976, and women had been elected to the local councils of Vaduz and Gamprin in 1983.

This referendum was also limited to male voters, and again both main parties had argued for its introduction. This time the referendum produced a vote in favour of the change, although only by the narrow margin of 119 votes, with 2,370 in favour and 2,251 against. Support was greater in Unterland than in Oberland. Voter turnout was 86.19%.

Following the referendum, amendments were made to the constitution to grant women the right to vote in national elections, although they did not gain the right to vote in local elections in three municipalities until 1986. The first national elections in which women could vote took place in 1986, and saw Emma Eigenmann elected to the Landtag on the Progressive Citizens' Party (FBP) list, becoming the first female member of the Landtag. In 1993 Cornelia Gassner of the FBP became the country's first female cabinet member.

== Results ==
Choice	Votes	%
For	2,370	51.3
Against	2,251	48.7
Invalid/blank votes	81	–
Total	4,702	100
Registered voters/turnout	5,453	86.2
Source: Nohlen & Stöver

== See also ==
- Women's suffrage in Liechtenstein
