= My Better Half =

My Better Half may refer to:

- My Better Half (album), a 2006 album by Tex Perkins and Tim Rogers
- My Better Half (TV series), a 2010 Hong Kong comedy series
- "My Better Half" (Odd Squad), a segment from a 2014 television episode

== See also ==
- My Better Halves, alternative title of the 2020 film Blithe Spirit
