= Pamela Abbott =

British sociologist

- Born: 27 June 1947 (age 79); London

Academic work
- Main interests: Sociology

Pamela Abbott, FAcSS (born 27 June 1947) is an English academic in sociology, gender and development studies. She is Director of the Centre for Global Development and Professor in the School of Education at the University of Aberdeen, and Director of the Centre for Global Development.

Abbott leads the Scottish Government-funded research project Fostering a Social Practice Approach to Adult Literacies for Improving People’s Quality of Life in Western Rwanda. She also leads the Global Health Research Group on promoting children’s and adolescent’s mental wellbeing in sub-Saharan Africa, a project funded by the National Institute for Health and Care Research.

In her writings on feminist perspectives in sociology, Abbott challenges a limited consideration of gender issues within mainstream sociology, and advocates a reconceputialisation and interdisciplinary approach in order to question fundamental assumptions in the discipline.

Abbott's recent research interests focus on quality of life and socioeconomic transitions in societies experiencing transformations following the Arab Spring.

== Selected bibliography ==
=== Books ===
- Abbott, Pamela (1987). Women and social class. London New York: Tavistock Publications. ISBN 9780422610001.
- Abbott, Pamela; Payne, Geoff (1990). The social mobility of women: beyond male mobility models. London England New York: Falmer Press. ISBN 9781850008453.
- Abbott, Pamela; Wallace, Claire (1990). The sociology of the caring professions. London New York: Falmer Press. ISBN 9781850008248.
- Abbott, Pamela; Wallace, Claire (1990). An introduction to sociology: feminist perspectives. London New York: Routledge. ISBN 9780415010368.
- Abbott, Pamela; Wallace, Claire (1992). The family and the new right. London Boulder, Colorado: Pluto Press. ISBN 9780745305332.
- Abbott, Pamela; Simmons, Maxine; McSherry, Robert (2002). Evidence-informed nursing: a guide for clinical nurses. London New York: Routledge. ISBN 9780415204972.
- Abbott, Pamela; Wallace, Claire; Sapsford, Roger (2016). The Decent Society. Abingdon: Routledge. ISBN 9781138909335.
- Teti, Andrea; Abbott, Pamela; Cavatorta, Francesco (2018). The Arab Uprisings in Egypt, Jordan and Tunisia: Social, Political and Economic Transformations. Basingstoke: Palgrave Macmillan. ISBN 9783319690438.

=== Journal articles ===
- Abbott, Pamela; Haerpfer, Christian; Wallace, Claire (Winter 2008). "Women in Rwandan politics and society". International Journal of Sociology. 38 (4): 111–125. doi:10.2753/IJS0020-7659380406. S2CID 142994312.
