= 1968 Liechtenstein referendums =

Women's suffrage
For	45.47%
Against	54.53%

Abolishing the tax on alcoholic drinks
For	43.68%
Against	56.32%

Two referendums were held in Liechtenstein in 1968. The first was held on 4 July on the question of introducing women's suffrage. Separate votes were held for men and women, with the men voting against, and women split almost equally, resulting in it being rejected by 54.5% of voters overall. The second referendum was held on 6 October on abolishing the tax on alcoholic drinks. It was rejected by 56.3% of voters.

A second referendum on women's suffrage was held in 1971 in which only men were allowed to vote. It also resulted in a "no" vote.

== Results ==
=== Women's suffrage ===
Choice	Men		Women		Total	
Choice	Votes	%	Votes	%	Votes	%
For	887	39.8	1,266	50.5	2,153	45.5
Against	1,341	60.2	1,241	49.5	2,582	54.5
Invalid/blank votes	–	–	–	–	31	–
Total	2,228	100	2,507	100	4,766	100
Registered voters/turnout	–	–	–	–	8,203	58.1
Source: Nohlen & Stöver, Kohn

=== Removal of alcoholic drinks tax ===
Choice	Votes	%
For	1,214	43.7
Against	1,565	56.3
Invalid/blank votes	78	–
Total	2,857	100
Registered voters/turnout	4,036	70.8
Source: Nohlen & Stöver
