= 1973 Liechtenstein referendums =

Women's suffrage
For	44.07%
Against	55.93%

New electoral system
For	55.83%
Against	44.17%

Reducing the electoral threshold from 18% to 8%
For	67.88%
Against	32.12%

Three referendums were held in Liechtenstein during 1973. The first was held on 11 February on introducing women's suffrage, but was rejected by 55.9% of voters. The second was held on 14 October on changing the electoral system to a candidate-based proportional system one, and was approved by 55.8% of voters. The third on 14 October was on reducing the electoral threshold from 18% to 8%, and was approved by 67.9% of voters.

== Results ==
=== Women's suffrage ===
Choice	Votes	%
For	1,675	44.1
Against	2,126	55.9
Invalid/blank votes	55	–
Total	3,856	100
Registered voters/turnout	4,483	86.0
Source: Nohlen & Stöver

=== New electoral system ===
Choice	Votes	%
For	1,705	55.8
Against	1,349	44.2
Invalid/blank votes	276	–
Total	3,330	100
Registered voters/turnout	4,528	73.5
Source: Nohlen & Stöver

=== Electoral threshold ===
Choice	Votes	%
For	2,086	67.9
Against	987	32.1
Invalid/blank votes	264	–
Total	3,337	100
Registered voters/turnout	4,528	73.7
Source: Nohlen & Stöver
