= Women's suffrage in Liechtenstein =

Women's suffrage in Liechtenstein was introduced on 1 July 1984, after the 1984 Liechtenstein women's suffrage referendum. Liechtenstein was the last nation in Europe to introduce this right.

== Prehistory ==
In the early modern period, the right to have a say and co-determination in public life for men and women were linked to ownership and tax liability. These rights were not recorded in writing but were exercised as self-government or common law. In very rural Liechtenstein, the community was organized at the community level. In the 19th century, however, these rights were lost due to new legislation. In the first state constitution, which was enacted in the Principality of Liechtenstein in 1818 based on the German Federal Act during the Congress of Vienna, the right to vote was only provided for men. The only exception was for widows when they were the head of the household.

In 1914, a brief message about the struggle of the suffragettes in England appeared for the first time in a Liechtenstein newspaper. In the eleven lines, the allegedly caused material damage by the "voting rights activists" was quantified. Although the active and passive right to vote for women was introduced in both Germany and Austria in 1918, the discussions in the Liechtenstein Parliament at that time were inconclusive. At that time it was unseemly for Liechtenstein women to appear in public – not even in writing. Women were certainly present in everyday life, but they had to correspond to a certain image of women. This was Catholic-conservative and characterized by motherliness and caring and left no room for participation in public space. When the state constitution, introduced in 1921, contained universal suffrage for men only, there was no public discussion about it.

Before the state elections in 1957, a party-affiliated state newspaper appealed to women to exercise their influence over the votes of their male family members, but their political equality was not seriously discussed. A short time later, in 1959, the first Swiss women's suffrage was held unsuccessfully and without any particular observation in the Liechtenstein press.

It was not until the mid-1960s that the issue of women's suffrage became topical again in Liechtenstein – as in Switzerland – in connection with other political developments.

In October 1965, Liechtenstein founded a youth parliament to which both men and women between the ages of 16 and 30 were allowed to belong. In the first year, the parliament had 123 members, but when it was dissolved in 1969 only 39. Among other things, the introduction of women's suffrage was also discussed here. Young Liechtensteiners, including the girl scouts, campaigned for women emancipatory issues.

Two attempts to introduce women’s right to vote and to vote based on a state parliament resolution were made in 1965 by the state parliament member and Vaduz building contractor Roman Gassner, and in 1968 by the state parliament member and lawyer Ernst Büchel. Both men were members of a different long-established political party and had the support of the state parliament member Otto Schaedler and the then head of government Gerard Batliner. Despite the support in principle, there was disagreement at the time about the correct political approach: a men's vote or a decision by the state parliament.

On 4 July 1968, women were allowed to take part in a referendum in the form of a consultative vote and, with a turnout of 61%, voted for their voting rights with a narrow majority of 50.5%. This opinion poll was decided negatively due to the clear rejection of the men (60.2%; participation 56%) with a rejection rate of 54.5%.

From 1969 onwards, Prince Franz-Josef II announced his support for the introduction of women's suffrage and voting rights several times, even if he did nothing politically.

== The struggle for the right to vote ==
=== First campaign for women's rights ===
As a result of the defeat in 1968, a "Committee for Women's Suffrage" was founded on 7 November 1969. The main initiators Bernadette Brunhart (née Biedermann) and Elfriede Winiger (née Seger) were working as secretaries in the state administration at the time. The committee tried to promote a positive change through discussion evenings and active participation in the political parties. The prevailing image of women in Liechtenstein, which emphasizes tradition and which was based on feminine charm and need for help, continued to serve as a yardstick. Women in Liechtenstein initially kept their distance from fighting in the style of the internationally known suffragettes. In the public discussion at that time, the legal position and social role of "married foreigners" came up in the context of a broader discussion about the "foreign infiltration" of the country.

=== Working group for women ===
On the occasion of the negative outcome of the plebiscite of 1971, the "Working Group for Women" was formed, a non-partisan organization that only dissolved in 1986 in favour of organizations founded later and in 1984 after political equality had been achieved.

The goal of "achieving meaningful equality" expressed in the later statutes of the association reflects the cautious approach of the working group. There was disagreement as to whether the women should conduct active public relations work or rather stay in the background and leave political actions to the parties.

=== Action Sleeping Beauty (AD) ===
Eight years after the negative outcome of the second referendum and after the introduction of women's suffrage at the community level in only two of Liechtenstein's eleven communities, Regina Marxer and Barbara Rheinberger launched the Sleeping Beauty Campaign in May 1981.

=== Men for women's suffrage (MfdF) ===
In 1982 "Aktion Dornröschen" received important support from initially 12 men who had accepted a personal invitation to take an active part in the group's public campaigns.

== Unsuccessful referendums ==
=== Popular vote in 1971 ===
On 5 October 1970, the Progressive Citizens' Party (FBP) launched a constitutional initiative, and on 17 December 1970 the introduction of women's rights to vote and suffrage was unanimously decided in the state parliament. In February 1971, however, this constitutional draft was narrowly rejected by the men entitled to vote in a referendum with a turnout of 85.9% with 1897 (51%) against 1816 votes (48.9%). Party-political rivalries between the FBP and the Fatherland Union (VU), which won the state elections for the first time in 1970, were cited as an explanation for this result, which deviated from the state parliament decision. The election results also showed that the majority of men in Liechtenstein were not yet ready to give up their electoral power and privileges.

Shortly afterwards, a small number of Liechtenstein women took to the streets for the first time to demonstrate for their rights. A few days later, the high school students marched through the main street of Vaduz, but were violently attacked and insulted by opponents of women's suffrage, some of whom uttered "Nazi ideas". Again the problem of xenophobia came to the fore.

Almost at the same time in February 1971 in Switzerland, through a referendum in which only male voters were allowed to participate, and with over 65% of the votes, women’s right to vote was introduced in Switzerland. Thus, Liechtenstein was the very last state in Europe that denied women equal political rights.

=== Referendum 1973 ===
From 1972 onwards, representatives of the newly formed "Working Group for Women" met with representatives from both parliamentary groups (FBP and VU) as well as the youth of the party. A renewed attempt at the referendum was supported at this political level. However, there was also a counter-movement that counteracted it with leaflets. However, the working group and its allies had made a conscious decision not to conduct a publicity campaign with posters.

On 19 October 1972 an application for the introduction of women's suffrage was submitted jointly by the FBP and VU in the state parliament. In particular, the foreign policy dimensions of the topic were brought up there, because Liechtenstein, as a small state, only had observer status (until 1978) at the Council of Europe and was not yet a member of the United Nations. The fact that these political and economic aspects played a role for the government of the country was clearly stated by Government Councillor Walter Oehry in the daily newspaper Liechtensteiner Vaterland on 8 February 1973, just one day before the vote:

"I think most of them have recognized that women's suffrage is not a women's whim, but that a lot depends on it for our country. If we didn't have to look to the right and left, we might still be more indifferent to how the vote ends. But people no longer believe our attempts to portray us as a progressive state with a living democracy. That would be a serious setback for the reputation of our country in the world." - Walter Oehry: Liechtensteiner Vaterland daily newspaper on February 8, 1973

The setback was evident after the vote in February 1973 with 55.9% of the vote (with a turnout of 86%) for the rejection of a corresponding constitutional law. With 451 no votes compared to the 81 no votes in 1971, the defeat was particularly severe and showed that a large number of Liechtensteiners were not yet ready to give up their traditional patriarchal attitudes. As in Switzerland, the strategy was then changed and political equality was sought on a smaller scale.

== Right to vote ==
On 7 July 1976, the state parliament authorized the state's eleven municipalities to vote on women's suffrage and, if necessary, to introduce it at the municipal level. It took a total of ten years before the last three municipalities followed the example of Vaduz on 20 April 1986. With votes in 1981 and 1984, the municipality of Schaan even needed two attempts.

Chronology of the introduction of women's suffrage at community level
Date	Community	Yes votes	Vote for no
17-19 September 1976	Vaduz	315	265
9 May 1980	Gamprin	90	62
23-25 October 1981	Schaan (rejected)	270	384
8 December 1983	Planken	34	15
11 December 1983	Ruggell	144	115
11 December 1983	Schellenberg	75	59
13-15 January 1984	Eschen	275	267
30 June-1 July 1984	Schaan	404	331
30 August-1 September 1985	Mauren	196	187
20 April 1986	Balzers	325	263
20 April 1986	Triesen	249	221
20 April 1986	Triesenberg	235	207

== The successful 3rd men's vote from 1984 ==
As in previous years, advocates of women's suffrage were divided over which course of action could lead to success. Representatives of the state parliament countered the argument of "Aktion Dornröschen" that the right to vote and to vote was a fundamental right by pointing out the necessary democratic process. The attempt to implement equality by law through a resolution of the state parliament was rejected with 7: 8 votes by the representatives of the state parliament in December 1983. While the opposition party FBP held on to the request for a state parliament resolution in April 1984, VU insisted on holding a men's vote. The president of the Landtag, Karlheinz Ritter (VU), even described the men's vote as a "deeply democratic decision".

The constitutional law passed by the state parliament on 11 April 1984, introducing women’s right to vote and suffrage was followed by a third male vote on 29 June and 1 July 1984. Although both parties advocated it, the result was modest: with 2370 votes in favour (51.3%) to 2251 votes against (48.7%) and a turnout of 86.2%, political equality at the state level was also achieved introduced a total difference of only 119 votes. The difference in votes in one of the two Liechtenstein constituencies, Unterland (which includes the municipalities of Ruggell, Schellenberg, Gamprin, Eschen and Mauren) was only three votes.

== Social impact ==
The introduction of voting rights for women was a partial success. It was not until 1992 that Article 31 of the constitution was paraphrased and explicitly stated that men and women have equal rights. An equality law was passed in 1999.

== Women in political office ==
After receiving the right to stand as a candidate, women had the option of going into active politics and holding office as elected representatives.

At the municipal level, three women were given municipal council seats in 1983 in the municipalities of Vaduz and Gamprin: Emma Brogle-Sele, Maria Marxer and Elsa Oehri. In the municipality of Gamprin, Maria Marxer was the first woman in Liechtenstein to be elected head of the municipality in 1991.

In the first state parliament election after 1984, Emma Eigenmann was elected as the only woman in the then 15-member state parliament in 1986. In 1989 she was re-elected as the only female member of the now 25-member state parliament. From 1993 Renate Wohlwend and Ingrid Hassler-Gerner belonged to the Liechtenstein Parliament. Thus, the proportion of women in the state parliament was 8%. In the legislative period from 2009 to 2013, six women sat in the state parliament, the highest number so far. Since 2009, a woman has been elected vice president of the State Parliament in every legislative period.

As the highest legislative body, the state parliament has the task of proposing to the prince a five-person government (as an executive body). Until 2019, no woman had ever been appointed head of government. Since 1993, seven women have been in office among the four councillors of the respective governments. On 2 July 2019, Aurelia Frick, who had been a member of three governments since 2009, was withdrawn from office by the state parliament.

== See also ==
- 1968 Liechtenstein referendums
- 1971 Liechtenstein women's suffrage referendum
- 1973 Liechtenstein referendums
- 1984 Liechtenstein women's suffrage referendum
- Komitée für das Frauenstimmrecht
