= 1971 Liechtenstein women's suffrage referendum =

Referendum on the introduction of women's suffrage, held in Liechtenstein

- 28 February 1971
- Referendum on the introduction of women's suffrage

Results
Choice	Votes	%
Yes	1,816	48.91%
No	1,897	51.09%
Valid votes	3,713	98.62%
Invalid or blank votes	52	1.38%
Total votes	3,765	100.00%
Registered voters/turnout	4,383	85.9%

A referendum on the introduction of women's suffrage was held in Liechtenstein on 28 February 1971. Voting was restricted to men, and resulted in a narrow majority against its introduction. Voter turnout was 85.6%. Following the referendum, some women demonstrated in Vaduz and other towns, booing male pedestrians and carrying signs bearing the slogan "Men of Liechtenstein: Where's your virility".

== Results ==
Choice	Votes	%
For	1,816	48.9
Against	1,897	51.1
Invalid/blank votes	52	–
Total	3,765	100
Registered voters/turnout	4,383	85.9
Source: Nohlen & Stöver
