= Venezuela at the 1992 Summer Olympics =

- IOC code: VEN
- NOC: Venezuelan Olympic Committee

in Barcelona
- Competitors: 25 in 7 sports
- Flag bearer: María Elena Giusti
- Medals: Gold 0 Silver 0 Bronze 0 Total 0

Summer Olympics appearances (overview)
- 1948; 1952; 1956; 1960; 1964; 1968; 1972; 1976; 1980; 1984; 1988; 1992; 1996; 2000; 2004; 2008; 2012; 2016; 2020; 2024; 2028

Venezuela competed at the 1992 Summer Olympics in Barcelona, Spain. 26 competitors, 22 men and 4 women, took part in 16 events in 8 sports.

== Competitors ==
The following is the list of number of competitors in the Games.

Sport	Men	Women	Total
Basketball	10	0	10
Boxing	3	–	3
Cycling	3	1	4
Diving	1	0	1
Judo	1	2	3
Weightlifting	3	–	3
Wrestling	1	–	1
Total	22	3	25

== Basketball ==
Summary

Key:

- OT – Overtime.

Team	Event	Group stage						Quarterfinal	Semi-final	Final / BM	
Team	Event	Opposition Score	Opposition Score	Opposition Score	Opposition Score	Opposition Score	Rank	Opposition Score	Opposition Score	Opposition Score	Rank
Venezuela men's	Men's tournament	Unified Team; L 64–78	Lithuania; L 79–87	Australia; L 71–78	Puerto Rico; L 82–96	China; W 96–88	5	—N/a	Spain; L 81–95	China; W 100–97	11

=== Men's tournament ===
Roster

Venezuela men's national basketball team roster
Players
Coaches

Pos.	No.	Name	Age – Date of birth	Height	Club	Ctr.
F	4	Víctor Díaz	24 – 4 February 1968	1.98 m (6 ft 6 in)	Houston Cougars	(United States)
G	5	David Díaz	27 – 6 September 1964	2.00 m (6 ft 7 in)	Cocodrilos de Caracas	(Venezuela)
C	6	Melquíades Jaramillo	25 – 11 January 1967
G	7	Nelson Solórzano	33 – 30 May 1959
F	8	Rostyn González	28 – 14 February 1964
	9	Luis Jiménez	30 – 21 January 1962
G	10	Sam Shepherd	39 – 21 April 1953
F	11	Carl Herrera	25 – 14 December 1966	2.06 m (6 ft 9 in)	Houston Rockets	(United States)
C	12	Omar Walcott	27 – 24 July 1965	2.04 m (6 ft 8 in)	Marinos de Anzoátegui	(Venezuela)
F	13	Gabriel Estaba	27 – 24 March 1965		Bravos de Portuguesa	(Venezuela)
F	14	Iván Olivares	30 – 10 December 1961		Trotamundos de Carabobo	(Venezuela)
F	15	Alexander Nelcha	24 – 21 January 1968		Maurienne Savoie	(France)

Head coach

- (Puerto Rico) Julio Toro

Legend

- Club – describes last
  club before the competition
- Age – describes age
  on 26 July 1992

Group play

Pos	Team	Pld	W	L	PF	PA	PD	Pts	Qualification
1	Unified Team	5	4	1	425	373	+52	9 (Note: Head-to-head record: Unified Team 1–0 Lithuania)	Quarterfinals
2	Lithuania	5	4	1	481	424	+57	9	Quarterfinals
3	Australia	5	3	2	432	396	+36	8 (Note: Head-to-head record: Australia 1–0 Puerto Rico)	Quarterfinals
4	Puerto Rico	5	3	2	445	440	+5	8	Quarterfinals
5	Venezuela	5	1	4	392	427	−35	6	9th−12th classification round
6	China	5	0	5	381	496	−115	5	9th−12th classification round

Source: FIBA
Rules for classification: 1) points; 2) head-to-head points; 3) head-to-head goal average; 4) head-to-head number of points scored.
Notes:

26 July 1992
9:30
v

Boxscore

Venezuela	64–78	Unified Team
Scoring by half: 16–34, 48–44
Pts: Estaba 21; Rebs: Walcott 4 Asts: Shepherd 5		Pts: Tikhonenko 18; Rebs: Volkov 7 Asts: Tikhonenko, Volkov 5

Palau Municipal d'Esports de Badalona, Barcelona

27 July 1992
11:30
v

Boxscore

Venezuela	79–87	Lithuania
Scoring by half: 46–38, 33–49
Pts: Shepherd 17; Rebs: Herrera 8 Asts: Shepherd 5		Pts: Marčiulionis 27; Rebs: Sabonis 11; Asts: Marčiulionis 8

Palau Municipal d'Esports de Badalona, Barcelona

29 July 1992
9:30
v

Boxscore

Venezuela	71–78	Australia
Scoring by half: 27–43, 44–35
Pts: Olivares 22; Rebs: Walcott 11; Asts: Estaba 4		Pts: Bradtke 16; Rebs: Bradtke 9 Asts: Gaze 7

Palau Municipal d'Esports de Badalona, Barcelona

31 July 1992
9:30
v

Boxscore

Venezuela	82–96	Puerto Rico
Scoring by half: 42–52, 40–44
Pts: Olivares 24; Rebs: Estaba 8 Asts: Estaba, Shepherd 4		Pts: López 19; Rebs: Mincy 14; Asts: López 7

Palau Municipal d'Esports de Badalona, Barcelona

2 August 1992
14:30
v

Boxscore

Venezuela	96–88	China
Scoring by half: 52–52, 44–36
Pts: Herrera 23; Rebs: Herrera 10; Asts: Walcott 5		Pts: Gong 18; Rebs: Shan 3 Asts: Sun J. 5

Palau Municipal d'Esports de Badalona, Barcelona

Classification game 9th-12th place

4 August 1992
11:30
v

Boxscore

Venezuela	81–95	Spain
Scoring by half: 40–46, 41–49
Pts: Herrera 26; Rebs: Estaba 8 Asts: Herrera 3		Pts: Herreros 25; Rebs: Andreu 9 Asts: Jofresa 4

Palau Municipal d'Esports de Badalona, Barcelona

11th place game

6 August 1992
9:00
v

Boxscore

China	97–100	Venezuela
Scoring by half: 51–51, 46–49
Pts: Wu 25; Rebs: Wang 5 Asts: Sun F. 6		Pts: Olivares 32; Rebs: Herrera 6 Asts: Herrera 4

Palau Municipal d'Esports de Badalona, Barcelona

== Boxing ==
Athlete	Event	Round of 32	Round of 16	Quarterfinals	Semifinals	Final	
Athlete	Event	Opposition Result	Opposition Result	Opposition Result	Opposition Result	Opposition Result	Rank
David Serradas	Flyweight	Chacón (PUR); W 12-3	Loch (GER); W 9-4	González (CUB); L 7-14	did not advance		
José Guzman	Welterweight	Odore (KEN); L RSC-2	did not advance				
Raimundo Yant	Light-Heavyweight	Benguesmia (ALG); L 11-15	did not advance				

== Cycling ==
Four cyclists, three men and one woman, represented Venezuela in 1992.

=== Road ===
Athlete	Event	Time	Rank
Carlos Maya	Men's road race	4:35:56	40
Robinson Merchán	Men's road race	DNF	
Hussein Monsalve	Men's road race	4:35:56	46

=== Track ===
Sprint

Athlete	Event	Qualification		Round 1	Repechage		Round 2	Repechage 2	Quarterfinals	Semifinals	Final	
Athlete	Event	Qualification		Round 1	Round 1	Round 2	Round 2	Repechage 2	Quarterfinals	Semifinals	Final	
Athlete	Event	Time Speed (km/h)	Rank	Opposition Time Speed (km/h)	Opposition Time Speed (km/h)	Opposition Time Speed (km/h)	Opposition Time Speed (km/h)	Opposition Time Speed (km/h)	Opposition Time Speed (km/h)	Opposition Time Speed (km/h)	Opposition Time Speed (km/h)	Rank
Daniela Larreal	Women's sprint	12.608; 57.107	11	Salumäe (EST), Neumann (GER); L	Kuroki (JPN); L	—N/a			Did not advance			

== Diving ==
Athlete	Event	Qualification		Final	
Athlete	Event	Points	Rank	Points	Rank
Dario di Fazio	Men's 3 m springboard	332.43	25	Did not advance	
Dario di Fazio	Men's 10 m platform	317.04	23	Did not advance	

== Judo ==
Athlete	Event	Round of 64	Round of 32	Round of 16	Quarterfinals	Semifinals	Repechage				Final	
Athlete	Event	Round of 64	Round of 32	Round of 16	Quarterfinals	Semifinals	Round 1	Round 2	Round 3	Round 4	Final	
Athlete	Event	Opposition Result	Opposition Result	Opposition Result	Opposition Result	Opposition Result	Opposition Result	Opposition Result	Opposition Result	Opposition Result	Opposition Result	Rank
Willis García	Men's –60 kg	Dino (PHI); W	Mafuta (ZAM); W	Yoon (KOR); L	Did not advance		—N/a	Lang (ISR); W	Kamrowski (POL); W	Pradayrol (FRA); L	Did not advance	
María Villapol	Women's –48 kg	—N/a	Bye	Souakri (ALG); L	Did not advance		Hilton (NZL); W	Bornemann (AUT); W	Şenyurt (TUR); L	—N/a	Did not advance	
Xiomara Griffith	Women's –61 kg	—N/a	Bye	Nagy (HUN); W	Fleury (FRA); L	Did not advance	Bye	Beltrán (CUB); W	Zhang (CHN); L	—N/a	Did not advance	

== Synchronized swimming ==
One synchronized swimmer represented Venezuela in 1992.

Athlete	Event	Figures		Qualification			Final		
Athlete	Event	Points	Rank	Points	Total (Figures + Qualification)	Rank	Points	Total (Figures + Final)	Rank
María Elena Giusti	Solo	84.973	22 Q	93.840	178.813	9	Did not advance		

== Weightlifting ==
Athlete	Event	Snatch		Clean & jerk		Total	Rank
Athlete	Event	Result	Rank	Result	Rank	Total	Rank
Humberto Fuentes	–52 kg	100.0	9	130.0	7	230.0	7
José Medina	–67.5 kg	120.0	15	160.0	10	280.0	14
Julio Luna	–82.5 kg	152.5	16	190.0	11	342.5	16

== Wrestling ==
Greco-Roman

Athlete	Event	Group Stage							Final	
Athlete	Event	Opposition Result	Opposition Result	Opposition Result	Opposition Result	Opposition Result	Opposition Result	Rank	Opposition Result	Rank
Luis Rondon	–82 kg	Turlyhanov (EUN); L 0–5^{VT}	Razzino (ITA); L 0–5^{VT}	Did not advance				9	Did not advance	

== See also ==
- Venezuela at the 1991 Pan American Games
