= List of Liechtenstein records in athletics =

The following are the national records in athletics in Liechtenstein maintained by its national athletics federation: Liechtensteiner Leichtathletikverband (LLV).

== Outdoor ==
Key to tables: Awaiting ratification Record not kept by LLV Not ratified or later rescinded by LLV

=== Men ===
Event	Record	Athlete	Date	Meet	Place	Ref.
100 m	10.53	Martin Frick	12 July 1996		Bellinzona, Switzerland	
200 m	21.14	Martin Frick	1 June 1998		Zofingen, Switzerland	
300 m	34.08	Martin Frick	25 April 1998		Cham, Switzerland	
400 m	49.35	Martin Meyer	22 May 1991	Games of the Small States of Europe	Andorra la Vella, Andorra	
400 m	47.9 h (Note: ratified by LLV but not recognised by World Athletics)	Günther Hasler	21 June 1975		Bern, Switzerland	
600 m	1:17.4 h	Günther Hasler	19 July 1975		Bern, Switzerland	
800 m	1:46.16	Günther Hasler	20 August 1975	Weltklasse Zürich	Zürich, Switzerland	
1000 m	2:18.6 h	Günther Hasler	20 August 1978		Nice, France	
1500 m	3:39.34	Günther Hasler	29 July 1976	Olympic Games	Montreal, Canada	
Mile	4:40.4 h	Hugo Walser	11 June 1960		Gisingen, Austria	
3000 m	8:10.63	Günther Hasler	1 May 1976		Zug, Switzerland	
5000 m	15:07.8 h	Hugo Walser	27 May 1965		Aarau, Switzerland	
10,000 m	31:29.18	Roland Wille	7 July 1994		Dübendorf, Switzerland	
Half marathon	1:07:51	Marcel Tschopp	29 March 2008		Oberriet, Switzerland	
Marathon	2:24:10.5	Marcel Tschopp	20 April 2008	Zürich Marathon	Zürich, Switzerland	
110 m hurdles	15.59 A	Franz Biedermann	15 October 1968	Olympic Games	Mexico City, Mexico	
400 m hurdles	57.94	Kurt Wachter	8 June 1985		Sargans, Switzerland	
3000 m steeplechase	10:08.37	Florian Hilti	24 June 2007	European Cup, 2nd League, Group B	Zenica, Bosnia and Herzegovina	
High jump	2.08 m	Christian Gloor	17 June 2001		Meilen, Switzerland	
High jump	2.08 m	Joel Riesen	31 May 2025	Games of the Small States of Europe	Andorra la Vella, Andorra	
Pole vault	4.70 m	Luc Thommen	2 July 2022		Frauenfeld, Switzerland	
Long jump	7.24 m	Franz Tschol	6 May 1989		St. Gallen, Switzerland	
Triple jump	13.62 m	Franz Biedermann	2 July 1967		Zürich, Switzerland	
Shot put	14.09 m	Stefan Kaufmann	29 April 2001		Geisingen, Germany	
Discus throw	43.36 m	Oskar Ospelt	23 July 1938		Basel, Switzerland	
Hammer throw	21.15 m	Dietmar Feger	23 August 2008		Alpnach, Switzerland	
Javelin throw	72.90 m	Matthias Verling	25 June 2025 (Note: by World Athletics source; 22 June by LLV source, probably a typo)	European Team Championships	Maribor, Slovenia	
Decathlon	6628 pts h	Alois Büchel	19–20 October 1964	Olympic Games	Tokyo, Japan	
Decathlon	100m / Long jump / Shot put / High jump / 400m / 110m H / Discus / Pole vault / Javelin / 1500m; 11.3 / 6.81 m / 12.16 m / 1.81 m / 49.7 / 17.5 / 37.19 m / 4.00 m / 44.90 m / 4:28.6					
20 km walk (road)						
50 km walk (road)						
4 × 100 m relay	42.41 (Note: federation accepts records with residential foreigners - 41.31 and 42.31 with non-residential foreigner)	Liechtenstein; P. Nägele; Franz Tschol (Switzerland) F. Brosi (SUI); Markus Büchel	16 May 1987	Games of the Small States of Europe	Fontvieille, Monaco	
4 × 400 m relay	3:25.20 (Note: federation accepts records with residential foreigners)	Liechtenstein (Switzerland) M. Vogelsang (SUI); Martin Frick; Martin Meyer; Franz Tschol	25 May 1991	Games of the Small States of Europe	Andorra la Vella, Andorra	

=== Women ===
Event	Record	Athlete	Date	Meet	Place	Ref.
100 m	11.84	Manuela Marxer	31 May 1995	Games of the Small States of Europe	Luxembourg, Luxembourg	
200 m	24.10	Yvonne Hasler	14 August 1988		Zug, Switzerland	
300 m	38.9	Manuela Marxer	23 July 1994		Geneva, Switzerland	
400 m	54.47	Maria Ritter	20 August 1978	Weltklasse Zürich	Zürich, Switzerland	
600 m	1:29.19	Maria Ritter	27 September 1981		Schaan, Liechtenstein	
800 m	2:02.82	Maria Ritter	27 August 1980		Koblenz, West Germany	
1000 m	2:42.09	Helen Ritter	19 August 1981		Zürich, Switzerland	
1500 m	4:16.2+ h	Helen Ritter	26 January 1980		Auckland, New Zealand	
Mile	4:37.9 h	Helen Ritter	26 January 1980		Auckland, New Zealand	
3000 m	9:23.12	Helen Ritter	29 August 1984		Koblenz, West Germany	
5000 m	18:35.42	Carmen Senti	6 June 1997	Games of the Small States of Europe	Reykjavík, Iceland	
5000 m	18:12.53 Mx (Note: ratified by LLV but not recognized by World Athletics)	Nicole Klingler	25 July 2014		Friedrichshafen, Germany	
10,000 m	36:57.24	Kerstin Mennenga-Metzler	24 August 2006		München, Germany	
10,000 m	39:43.65 Mx	Kerstin Mennenga	2 April 2005		Dornbirn, Austria	
Half marathon	1:22:06	Maria Wille	11 August 1992		Radolfzell, Germany	
Marathon	2:51:20	Nicole Klinger	11 May 2008		Prague, Czech Republic	
100 m hurdles	13.38	Manuela Marxer	17 July 1994		Jona, Switzerland	
400 m hurdles	1:04.08	Claudia Fantina	6 September 1992		Colombier, Switzerland	
3000 m steeplechase						
High jump	1.79 m	Yvonne Hasler	10 June 1989		Schaan, Liechtenstein	
Pole vault	2.30 m	Hannah Meier	5 July 2014	IBL-Meisterschaften	Götzis, Austria	
Long jump	6.13 m	Manuela Marxer	9 August 1994		Helsinki, Finland	
Triple jump						
Shot put	13.62 m	Jule Insinna	18 May 2024		Schaan, Liechtenstein	
Discus throw	50.49 m	Jule Insinna	24 August 2025	Swiss Championships	Frauenfeld, Switzerland	
Hammer throw						
Javelin throw	50.22 m	Julia Rohrer	27 May 2025	Games of the Small States of Europe	Andorra la Vella, Andorra	
Heptathlon	6093 pts	Manuela Marxer	28–29 May 1994	Hypo-Meeting	Götzis, Austria	
Heptathlon	100m H / High jump / Shot put / 200m / Long jump / Javelin / 800m; 13.45 / 1.72 m / 13.03 m / 24.14 / 6.07 m w / 40.38 m / 2:13.49					
20 km walk (road)						
50 km walk (road)						
4 × 100 m relay	46.92 (Note: federation accepts records with residential foreigners)	Liechtenstein (Switzerland) K. Sutter (SUI); Yvonne Hasler; Manuela Marxer; M. Biedermann	20 May 1989	Games of the Small States of Europe	Nicosia, Cyprus	
4 × 400 m relay						

== Indoor ==
=== Men ===
Event	Record	Athlete	Date	Meet	Place	Ref.
60 m	7.20	Fabian Haldner	8 February 2014	Stadtwerke Sindelfingen Hallenmeeting	Sindelfingen, Germany	
200 m	22.96	Fabian Haldner	1 February 2014		Magglingen, Switzerland	
400 m	51.33	Fabian Haldner	2 February 2013		Magglingen, Switzerland	
800 m	1:47.41	Günther Hasler	24 February 1977		Milan, Italy	
1500 m	3:50.8	Günther Hasler	29 January 1977		Böblingen, Switzerland	
3000 m	8:25.87	Günther Hasler	19 February 1978		Magglingen, Switzerland	
60 m hurdles						
High jump	1.92 m	Simon Hasler	17 January 2016	Internationales ASVÖ Hallenmeeting	Dornbirn, Austria	
Pole vault	3.50 m	Johannes Hasler	17 January 2016	Internationales ASVÖ Hallenmeeting	Dornbirn, Austria	
Long jump	5.90 m	Simon Hasler	23 February 2014	22. Internationales ASVÖ Hallenmeeting	Magglingen, Switzerland	
Triple jump						
Shot put	11.08 m	Simon Hasler	8 February 2015	Internationales ASVÖ Hallenmeeting	Dornbirn, Austria	
Heptathlon						
Heptathlon	60m / Long jump / Shot put / High jump / 60m H / Pole vault / 1000m					
5000 m walk						
4 × 400 m relay						

=== Women ===
Event	Record	Athlete	Date	Meet	Place	Ref.
60 m	7.60	Fiona Matt	21 February 2026	Swiss U18 Championship	Magglingen, Switzerland	
200 m						
400 m	59.53	Maria Ritter	21 February 1976	European Championships	Munich, West Germany	
800 m	2:15.4	Maria Ritter	21 February 1976	European Championships	Munich, West Germany	
1500 m						
3000 m						
60 m hurdles	8.41	Manuela Marxer	24 February 1994		Mannheim, Germany	
High jump	1.69 m	Manuela Marxer	6 February 1994		Magglingen, Switzerland	
Pole vault	2.50 m	Kathrin Berginz	25 January 2014		Dornbirn, Austria	
Long jump	5.90 m	Manuela Marxer	11 February 1994		Mannheim, Germany	
Triple jump						
Shot put	13.36 m	Manuela Marxer	7 February 1994		Magglingen, Switzerland	
Pentathlon						
Pentathlon	60m H / High jump / Shot put / Long jump / 800m					
3000 m walk						
4 × 400 m relay						
