= Judo at the 1992 Summer Olympics – Women's 61 kg =

Judo at the Olympics

Women's 61 kg at the Games of the XXV Olympiad
- Venue: Palau Blaugrana
- Date: 30 July 1992
- Competitors: 29 from 29 nations

Medalists
1st place, gold medalist(s)		Cathérine Fleury	France
2nd place, silver medalist(s)		Yael Arad	Israel
3rd place, bronze medalist(s)		Yelena Petrova	Unified Team
3rd place, bronze medalist(s)		Zhang Di	China

The women's 61 kg competition in judo at the 1992 Summer Olympics in Barcelona was held on 30 July at the Palau Blaugrana. The gold medal was won by Cathérine Fleury of France.

== Results ==
=== Main brackets ===
==== Pool A ====
Round of 32
Susanne Profanter (AUT)	YUS
Eleucadia Vargas (DOM)	E
Bogusława Olechnowicz (POL)	E
Diane Bell (GBR)	YUK
Tânia Ishii (BRA)	E
Zhang Di (CHN)	IPO
Nicola Morris (NZL)	RA
Gu Hyeon-suk (KOR)	IPO
Michelle Buckingham (CAN)	E
Ileana Beltran (CUB)	IPO
Cathérine Fleury (FRA)	IPO
Debbie Warren-Jeans (ZIM)	RA
Zsuzsa Nagy (HUN)	IPO
Lkhamaasürengiin Badamsüren (MGL)	E

Round of 16
Susanne Profanter (AUT)	E
Diane Bell (GBR)	YUK
Zhang Di (CHN)	RA
Gu Hyeon-suk (KOR)	YUK
Ileana Beltran (CUB)	RA
Cathérine Fleury (FRA)	SHI
Zsuzsa Nagy (HUN)	E
Xiomara Griffith (VEN)	IPO

Quarterfinal
Diane Bell (GBR)	RA
Gu Hyeon-suk (KOR)	YUS
Cathérine Fleury (FRA)	IPO
Xiomara Griffith (VEN)	RA

Semifinal
Gu Hyeon-suk (KOR)	RB
Cathérine Fleury (FRA)	IPO

==== Pool B ====
Round of 32
Jenny Gal (NED)	IPO
Laurie Pace (MLT)	E
Frauke Eickhoff (GER)	IPO
Yelena Petrova (EUN)	RB
Thant Phyu Phyu (MYA)	E
Gella Vandecaveye (BEL)	IPO
Miroslava Jánošíková (TCH)	IPO
Felicité Makounawode (CAF)	E
Lynn Roethke (USA)	E
Birgit Blum (LIE)	KOK
Begoña Gómez (ESP)	YUK
Takako Kobayashi (JPN)	E

Round of 16
Jenny Gal (NED)	RB
Frauke Eickhoff (GER)	WAZ
Gella Vandecaveye (BEL)	IPO
Gisela Hämmerling (SUI)	E
Miroslava Jánošíková (TCH)	KOK
Birgit Blum (LIE)
Begoña Gómez (ESP)	RB
Yael Arad (ISR)	WAZ

Quarterfinal
Frauke Eickhoff (GER)	WAZ
Gella Vandecaveye (BEL)	RB
Miroslava Jánošíková (TCH)	RB
Yael Arad (ISR)	WAZ

Semifinal
Frauke Eickhoff (GER)	RA
Yael Arad (ISR)	WIP

=== Repechages ===
==== Repechage A ====
Repechage round 1
Nicola Morris (NZL)	E
Zhang Di (CHN)	WIP
Debbie Warren-Jeans (ZIM)	E
Ileana Beltran (CUB)	WAZ

Repechage quarterfinal
Zhang Di (CHN)	YUK
Diane Bell (GBR)	E
Ileana Beltran (CUB)	E
Xiomara Griffith (VEN)	YUS

Repechage semifinal
Zhang Di (CHN)	YUK
Xiomara Griffith (VEN)	E

Repechage final
Zhang Di (CHN)	YUK (bronze)
Frauke Eickhoff (GER)	E

==== Repechage B ====
Repechage round 1
Yelena Petrova (EUN)	IPO
Jenny Gal (NED)	E

Repechage quarterfinal
Yelena Petrova (EUN)	WAZ
Gella Vandecaveye (BEL)	E
Begoña Gómez (ESP)	YUK
Miroslava Jánošíková (TCH)	E

Repechage semifinal
Yelena Petrova (EUN)	IPO
Begoña Gómez (ESP)	E

Repechage final
Yelena Petrova (EUN)	IPO (bronze)
Gu Hyeon-suk (KOR)	E

=== Final ===
Final
Cathérine Fleury (FRA)	YUS (gold)
Yael Arad (ISR)	2nd place, silver medalist(s)

== Final classification ==
Rank	Judoka	Nation
1st place, gold medalist(s)	Cathérine Fleury	France
2nd place, silver medalist(s)	Yael Arad	Israel
3rd place, bronze medalist(s)	Yelena Petrova	Unified Team
3rd place, bronze medalist(s)	Zhang Di	China
5T	Frauke Eickhoff	Germany
5T	Gu Hyeon-suk	South Korea
7T	Xiomara Griffith	Venezuela
7T	Begoña Gómez	Spain
9T	Diane Bell	Great Britain
9T	Ileana Beltran	Cuba
9T	Gella Vandecaveye	Belgium
9T	Miroslava Jánošíková	Czechoslovakia
13T	Nicola Morris	New Zealand
13T	Debbie Warren-Jeans	Zimbabwe
13T	Jenny Gal	Netherlands
16T	Susanne Profanter	Austria
16T	Zsuzsa Nagy	Hungary
16T	Gisela Hämmerling	Switzerland
16T	Birgit Blum	Liechtenstein
20T	Eleucadia Vargas	Dominican Republic
20T	Bogusława Olechnowicz	Poland
20T	Tânia Ishii	Brazil
20T	Lkhamaasürengiin Badamsüren	Mongolia
20T	Michelle Buckingham	Canada
20T	Laurie Pace	Malta
20T	Thant Phyu Phyu	Myanmar
20T	Felicité Makounawode	Central African Republic
20T	Lynn Roethke	United States
20T	Takako Kobayashi	Japan
