= Liechtenstein at the 1988 Summer Olympics =

- IOC code: LIE
- NOC: Liechtenstein Olympic Committee

in Seoul
- Competitors: 12 (9 men, 3 women) in 5 sports
- Flag bearer: Yvonne Elkuch
- Medals: Gold 0 Silver 0 Bronze 0 Total 0

Summer Olympics appearances (overview)
- 1936; 1948; 1952; 1956; 1960; 1964; 1968; 1972; 1976; 1980; 1984; 1988; 1992; 1996; 2000; 2004; 2008; 2012; 2016; 2020; 2024

Liechtenstein competed at the 1988 Summer Olympics in Seoul, South Korea. Twelve competitors, nine men and three women, took part in fifteen events in five sports.

== Competitors ==
The following is the list of number of competitors in the Games.

Sport	Men	Women	Total
Athletics	1	2	3
Cycling	2	1	3
Equestrian	1	0	1
Judo	4	–	4
Shooting	1	0	1
Total	9	3	12

== Athletics ==
Men's 100 metres

- Markus Büchel

- Heat – 11.21 (→ did not advance)

Men's 200 metres

- Markus Büchel

- Heat – 22.02 (→ did not advance)

Women's Heptathlon

- Yvonne Hasler

- Final Result – did not start (→ no ranking)

Women's 100 m Hurdles

- Manuela Marxer

- Heat – 14.38 (→ did not advance)

== Cycling ==
Three cyclists, two men and one woman, represented Liechtenstein in 1988.

Men's road race

- Peter Hermann Final – 4:32:56 (→ 54th place)
- Patrick Matt Final – did not finish (→ no ranking)

Men's 1 km time trial

- Peter Hermann Final – ?? (→ 21st place)

Men's individual pursuit

- Patrick Matt Final – ?? (→ 18th place)

Men's points race

- Peter Hermann Qualification – did not qualify (→ 25th place)

Women's road race

- Yvonne Elkuch – 2:00:52 (→ 17th place)

== Equestrian ==
- Thomas Batliner

== Judo ==
Men's Competition

- Daniel Brunhart
- Magnus Büchel
- Arnold Frick
- Johannes Wohlwend

- Final Result -71 kg (→ 7th place)

== Shooting ==
Men's Competition

- Gilbert Kaiser
