= Liechtenstein at the 1992 Summer Olympics =

- IOC code: LIE
- NOC: Liechtenstein Olympic Committee

in Barcelona
- Competitors: 7 (4 men, 3 women) in 4 sports
- Flag bearer: Manuela Marxer
- Medals: Gold 0 Silver 0 Bronze 0 Total 0

Summer Olympics appearances (overview)
- 1936; 1948; 1952; 1956; 1960; 1964; 1968; 1972; 1976; 1980; 1984; 1988; 1992; 1996; 2000; 2004; 2008; 2012; 2016; 2020; 2024

Liechtenstein competed at the 1992 Summer Olympics in Barcelona, Spain. Seven competitors, four men and three women, took part in eight events in four sports.

== Competitors ==
The following is the list of number of competitors in the Games.

Sport	Men	Women	Total
Athletics	1	1	2
Cycling	1	1	2
Judo	1	1	2
Shooting	1	0	1
Total	4	3	7

== Athletics ==
Men
Track and road events

Athletes	Events	Final	
Athletes	Events	Time	Rank
Roland Wille	Marathon	2:31.32	68

Women
Combined events – Heptathlon

Athlete	Event	100H	HJ	SP	200 m	LJ	JT	800 m	Final	Rank
Manuela Marxer	Result	13.94	1.67	12.40	24.43	5.74	41.08	2:17.53	5749	24
Manuela Marxer	Points	987	818	688	940	771	688	857	5749	24

== Cycling ==
Two cyclists, one man and one woman, represented Liechtenstein in 1992.

=== Road ===
Athlete	Event	Time	Rank
Yvonne Elkuch	Women's road race	2:21:32	47

=== Track ===
Pursuit

Athlete	Event	Qualification		Quarterfinals	Semifinals	Final	
Athlete	Event	Time	Rank	Opposition Time	Opposition Time	Opposition Time	Rank
Patrick Matt	Men's individual pursuit	4:46.982	19	did not advance			

Points race

Athlete	Event	Qualification			Final		
Athlete	Event	Points	Laps	Rank	Points	Laps	Rank
Patrick Matt	Men's points race	3	0	3 Q	5	0	17

== Judo ==
Men

Athlete	Event	Preliminary	Round of 32	Round of 16	Quarterfinals	Semifinals	Repechage 1	Repechage 2	Repechage 3	Repechage Final	Final / BM	
Athlete	Event	Opposition Result	Opposition Result	Opposition Result	Opposition Result	Opposition Result	Opposition Result	Opposition Result	Opposition Result	Opposition Result	Opposition Result	Rank
Walther Kaiser	−65 kg	Jimmy Pedro (USA); L 0000–1000	did not advance									36

Women

Athlete	Event	Round of 32	Round of 16	Quarterfinals	Semifinals	Repechage 1	Repechage 2	Repechage Final	Final / BM	
Athlete	Event	Opposition Result	Opposition Result	Opposition Result	Opposition Result	Opposition Result	Opposition Result	Opposition Result	Opposition Result	Rank
Birgit Blum	−61 kg	Lynn Roethke (USA); W 0010-0000	Miroslava Jánošíková (TCH); L 0000-0010	Did not advance						16

== Shooting ==
Men

Athlete	Event	Qualification		Semifinal		Final	
Athlete	Event	Score	Rank	Score	Rank	Score	Rank
Josef Brendle	10 m air rifle	576	39	—N/a		did not advance	
