= Liechtenstein at the 1936 Summer Olympics =

- IOC code: LIE
- NOC: Liechtenstein Olympic Committee

in Berlin, Germany 1–16 August 1936
- Competitors: 6 in 3 sports
- Flag bearer: Oskar Ospelt
- Medals: Gold 0 Silver 0 Bronze 0 Total 0

Summer Olympics appearances (overview)
- 1936; 1948; 1952; 1956; 1960; 1964; 1968; 1972; 1976; 1980; 1984; 1988; 1992; 1996; 2000; 2004; 2008; 2012; 2016; 2020; 2024

Liechtenstein competed at the 1936 Summer Olympics in Berlin, Germany, which took place from 1 to 16 August 1936. It was the first Summer Olympics in which Liechtenstein competed, as the Liechtenstein Olympic Committee had been founded the year prior. Six male competitors took part in five events in three sports. None of them won medals.

It was only at these games that Liechtenstein realized their flag was identical to that of Haiti. This prompted Liechtenstein to add the crown found in their current flag so that both flags could be distinguishable from each other at the opening ceremony. The modified design made in the ceremony was officially adopted by Liechtenstein on 24 June 1937.

== Background ==
Liechtenstein competed at these Games from 1 to 16 August 1936, which marked its debut in the Summer Olympics. It was the nation's second appearance at an Olympic Games after competing in the 1936 Winter Olympics held in Garmisch-Partenkirchen, Germany, a few months prior. Four athletes were sent to the competition. In order to do so, the Liechtenstein Olympic Committee was established the previous year under the initiative of Woldemar von Falz-Fein and Eduard von Falz-Fein.

=== Delegation ===
The Liechtenstein delegation consisted of nine people. The officials were Alexander Frick, who was the president of the Liechtenstein committee for the Games, Eduard Theodor von Falz-Fein as the attaché and part of the jury in the shooting events, and Franz I, Prince of Liechtenstein, as a representative of the International Olympic Committee. The athletes that competed were runner Xaver Frick, who competed in the men's 100 metres and 200 metres, runner and thrower Oskar Ospelt, who competed in the 100 metres and men's discus throw, cyclist Adolf Schreiber, who competed in the men's road race, and sport shooters Augustin Hilty, Rudolf Jehle, and Rudolf Senti, who all competed in the men's 50 metre rifle prone.

=== Opening ceremony and flag incident ===
Oskar Ospelt carried the flag for the nation at the opening ceremony. Before the opening ceremony, the delegations of Haiti and Liechtenstein noticed that the civil flag of Haiti was identical to that of the flag of Liechtenstein. As a result, both nations agreed to carry different flags during the ceremony. Liechtenstein received approval from their government to carry the flag upside-down and add a golden "Prince's Crown" in the corner, while Haiti added the national arms in order to make it into the state flag instead. This directly led to Liechtenstein adding the crown to their flag. This modified design was adopted on 24 June 1937.

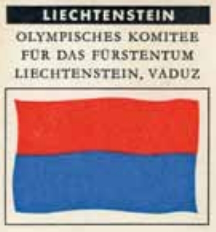
Modified Liechtenstein Olympic Committee logo

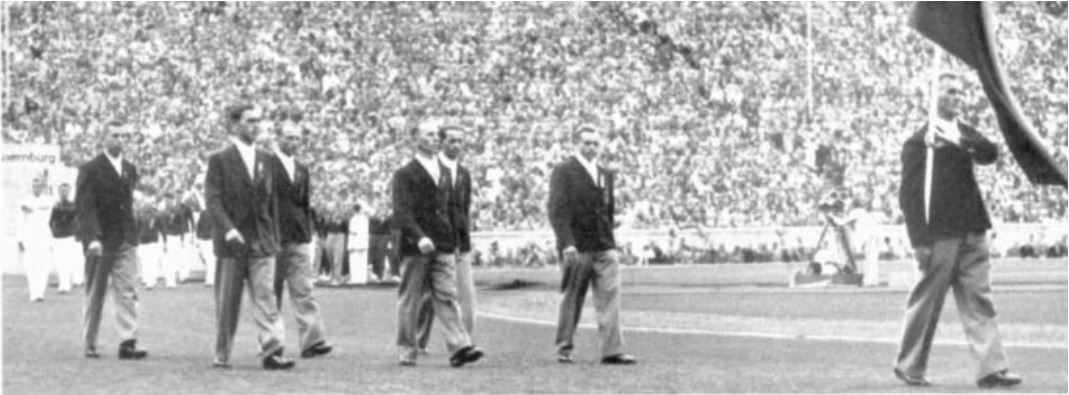
Liechtenstein in the Parade of Nations with Ospelt holding the modified flag

== Athletics ==
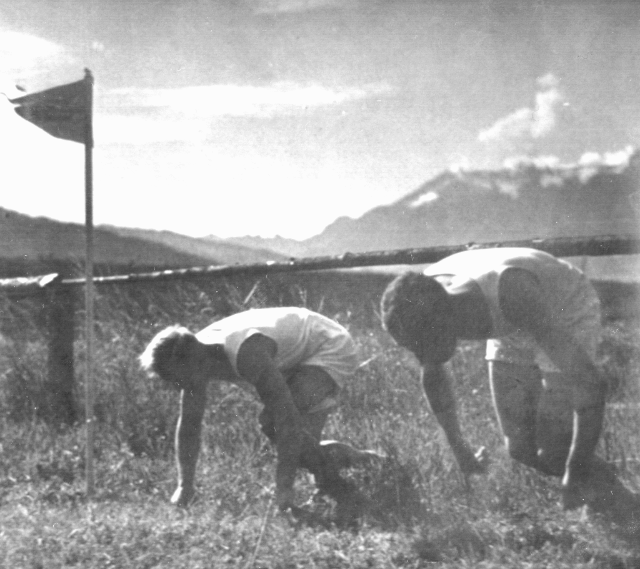
Frick and Ospelt at Liechtenstein's Olympic trials in 1936

Liechtenstein held trials for athletics events before their debut in the Summer Olympics. Xaver Frick and Oskar Ospelt took part in the trials. Frick won the races over 200, 400, and 800 metres, while Ospelt won the discus throw, javelin throw, and the 100 metres in a time of 11 seconds.

At the Olympics, both men first competed in the men's 100 metres on 2 August 1936. Ospelt ran in the sixth heat, while Frick ran in the ninth heat. Both of them placed last, placing six out of six competitors within their heats, and finished with times not fast enough to progress further. Eventually, Jesse Owens of the United States took the gold medal on 3 August, in a time of 10.3 seconds.

Frick then competed in the men's 200 metres on 4 August. He ran in the second heat and placed sixth out of six competitors, finishing with a time not fast enough to progress further. Owens eventually took the gold once more, finishing with an world record-setting time of 20.7 seconds.

Ospelt competed in the last athletics event for the nation in the men's discus throw on 5 August. He placed 26th in the qualifying round and did not advance as an athlete had to have a throw of 44 metres or more to qualify. Ken Carpenter eventually took the gold in an Olympic record-setting distance of 50.48 metres.

Men
Track & road events

Athlete	Event	Heat		Quarterfinal		Semifinal		Final	
Athlete	Event	Result	Rank	Result	Rank	Result	Rank	Result	Rank
Xaver Frick	100 m	?	6	Did not advance					
Xaver Frick	200 m	?	6	Did not advance					
Oskar Ospelt	100 m	?	6	Did not advance					

Field events

Athlete	Event	Qualification		Final	
Athlete	Event	Distance	Position	Distance	Position
Oskar Ospelt	Discus throw	?	26	Did not advance	

== Cycling ==
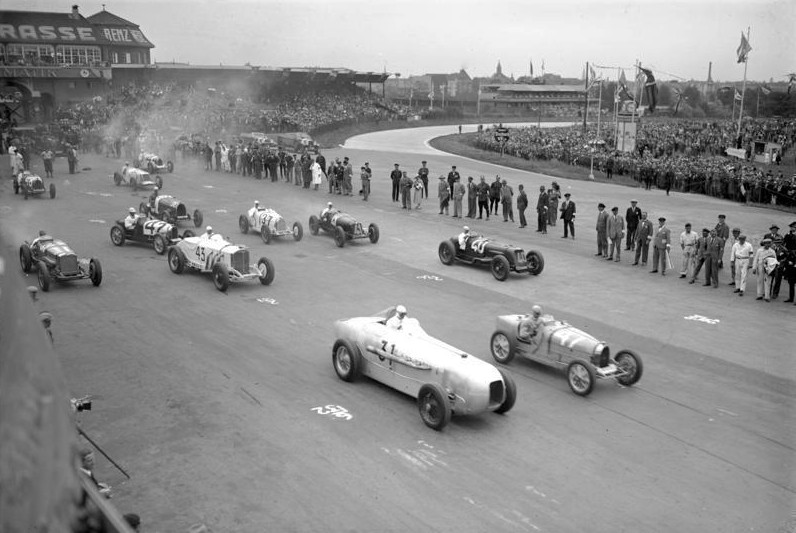
The Avus Motor Road, where Schreiber competed in his event

Liechtenstein entered one athlete into cycling. The nation picked cyclist Adolf Schreiber, who competed in the men's individual road race, which was held at the Avus Motor Road. The event took place on 10 August 1936. The race spanned over 100 kilometres. He finished in an unknown time, placing between 39th and 94th. Robert Charpentier of France eventually took the gold in a time of 2:33:05.

=== Road ===
Athlete	Event	Time	Rank
Adolf Schreiber	Men's road race	?	39–94

== Shooting ==
Liechtenstein entered three shooters. The nation picked shooters Augustin Hilty, Rudolf Jehle, and Rudolf Senti, who all competed in the men's 50 metre rifle prone. Their event was held at the Wannsee Shooting Range on 8 August 1936. Hilty obtained 288 rings and tied for 44th, Senti obtained 281 rings and tied for 61st, and Jehle obtained 280 rings and placed 63rd. The eventual winner was Willy Røgeberg of Norway, who set an Olympic record by obtaining 300 out of 300 possible rings.

Men

Athlete	Event	Shoot off	Final
Athlete	Event	Score	Rank
Augustin Hilty	50 metre rifle prone	288	=44
Rudolf Jehle	50 metre rifle prone	280	63
Rudolf Senti	50 metre rifle prone	281	=61
