= Liechtenstein at the 2008 Summer Olympics =

- IOC code: LIE
- NOC: Liechtenstein Olympic Committee
- Website: www.olympic.li (in German and English)

in Beijing
- Competitors: 2 in 2 sports
- Flag bearer: Marcel Tschopp
- Medals: Gold 0 Silver 0 Bronze 0 Total 0

Summer Olympics appearances (overview)
- 1936; 1948; 1952; 1956; 1960; 1964; 1968; 1972; 1976; 1980; 1984; 1988; 1992; 1996; 2000; 2004; 2008; 2012; 2016; 2020; 2024

Liechtenstein competed at the 2008 Summer Olympics, held in Beijing, China. The Liechtenstein Olympic Committee nominated two athletes for the games to compete across two sports. Marcel Tschopp represented Liechtenstein in the athletics events and Oliver Geissmann in the shooting events. A third athlete, tennis player Stephanie Vogt was also due to compete but had to withdraw because of an injury.

Tschopp completed the marathon and finished 74th overall while Geissmann was eliminated in the preliminary round of the men's 10 m air rifle.

== Athletics ==
One Liechtensteiner athlete participated in the athletics events – Marcel Tschopp in the men's marathon.

The men's marathon took place on 24 August 2008 at 7:30 am. The marathon distance of 26 miles, 385 yards was run over a point-to-point route which ended in the Beijing National Stadium, also known as the Bird's Nest, in the Chaoyang District of Beijing. Tschopp completed the race in a time of 2 hours, 35 minutes and 6 seconds to finish 74th overall out of the 76 athletes who finished the race.

Athlete	Event	Final	
Athlete	Event	Result	Rank
Marcel Tschopp	Men's marathon	2:35:06	74

== Shooting ==
One Liechtensteiner athlete participated in the shooting events – Oliver Geissmann in the men's 10 m air rifle.

The men's 10 m air rifle took place on 11 August 2008 at the Beijing Shooting Range Hall in the Shijingshan District of Beijing. Geissmann recorded a score of 588 in the preliminary round which was not enough to advance to the final and finished 34th overall.

Athlete	Event	Qualification		Final	
Athlete	Event	Points	Rank	Points	Rank
Oliver Geissmann	Men's 10 m air rifle	588	34	did not advance	

== Tennis ==
One Liechtensteiner athlete was due to compete in the tennis events – Stephanie Vogt in the women's singles. However, she was forced to withdraw through injury and was replaced by Tamarine Tanasugarn of Thailand.
