= Liechtenstein at the 1984 Summer Olympics =

- IOC code: LIE
- NOC: Liechtenstein Olympic Committee

in Los Angeles
- Competitors: 7 (5 men and 2 women) in 3 sports
- Flag bearer: Manuela Marxer
- Medals: Gold 0 Silver 0 Bronze 0 Total 0

Summer Olympics appearances (overview)
- 1936; 1948; 1952; 1956; 1960; 1964; 1968; 1972; 1976; 1980; 1984; 1988; 1992; 1996; 2000; 2004; 2008; 2012; 2016; 2020; 2024

Liechtenstein competed at the 1984 Summer Olympics in Los Angeles, United States.

== Results by event ==
=== Athletics ===
Men's 100 metres

- Markus Büchel

- Heat — 10.98 (→ did not advance)

Men's 200 metres

- Markus Büchel

- Heat — 22.14 (→ did not advance)

Women's 1,500 metres

- Helen Ritter

- Heat — 4:19.39 (→ did not advance)

Women's 3,000 metres

- Maria Ritter

- Heat — did not start (→ did not advance)

Women's Heptathlon

- Manuela Marxer

- Final Result — 4913 points (→ 20th place)

=== Judo ===
Men's Competition

- Magnus Büchel

- Final Result -86 kg (→ 7th place)

- Johannes Wohlwend

- Final Result -71 kg (→ 9th place)

=== Shooting ===
Men's Competition

- Remo Sele
- Theo Schurte
