= Liechtenstein at the 1960 Summer Olympics =

- IOC code: LIE
- NOC: Liechtenstein Olympic Committee

in Rome
- Competitors: 5 in 3 sports
- Flag bearer: Alois Büchel
- Medals: Gold 0 Silver 0 Bronze 0 Total 0

Summer Olympics appearances (overview)
- 1936; 1948; 1952; 1956; 1960; 1964; 1968; 1972; 1976; 1980; 1984; 1988; 1992; 1996; 2000; 2004; 2008; 2012; 2016; 2020; 2024

Liechtenstein competed at the 1960 Summer Olympics in Rome, Italy. Five competitors, all men, took part in six events in three sports.

== Athletics ==
Men's Competition

- Alois Büchel
- Egon Oehri

== Cycling ==
One cyclist represented Liechtenstein in 1960.

Individual road race

- Adolf Heeb

== Shooting ==
Two shooters represented Liechtenstein in 1960.

50 m rifle, three positions

- Gustav Kaufmann
- Guido Wolf

50 m rifle, prone

- Guido Wolf
- Gustav Kaufmann
