= Profanter =

Profanter is a surname. Notable people with the surname include:

- Susanne Profanter (born 1970), Austrian judoka
- Ursula Profanter (born 1968), Austrian sprint canoer and marathon canoeist
