= Liechtenstein at the 2000 Summer Olympics =

- IOC code: LIE
- NOC: Liechtenstein Olympic Committee
- Website: www.olympic.li (in German and English)

in Sydney
- Competitors: 2 in 2 sports
- Medals: Gold 0 Silver 0 Bronze 0 Total 0

Summer Olympics appearances (overview)
- 1936; 1948; 1952; 1956; 1960; 1964; 1968; 1972; 1976; 1980; 1984; 1988; 1992; 1996; 2000; 2004; 2008; 2012; 2016; 2020; 2024

Liechtenstein competed at the 2000 Summer Olympics in Sydney, Australia.

Sydney 2000 marked the first time the Liechtenstein Olympic team competed in Australia as Liechtenstein and other European nations boycotted the 1956 Summer Olympics in Melbourne due to the Soviet invasion of Hungary.

== Judo ==
Athlete	Event	Round of 32	Round of 16	Quarterfinals	Semifinals	Repechage 1	Repechage 2	Repechage 3	Final / BM	
Athlete	Event	Opposition Result	Opposition Result	Opposition Result	Opposition Result	Opposition Result	Opposition Result	Opposition Result	Opposition Result	Rank
Ulrike Kaiser	Women's −52 kg	BYE	Devi (IND); L 0000–1000	did not advance						

== Shooting ==
Athlete	Event	Qualification		Final	
Athlete	Event	Points	Rank	Points	Rank
Oliver Geissmann	10 m air rifle	582	41	did not advance	
