= Liechtenstein at the 2012 Summer Olympics =

- IOC code: LIE
- NOC: Liechtenstein Olympic Committee
- Website: www.olympic.li (in German and English)

in London
- Competitors: 3 in 3 sports
- Flag bearers: Stephanie Vogt (opening); Julia Hassler (closing)
- Medals: Gold 0 Silver 0 Bronze 0 Total 0

Summer Olympics appearances (overview)
- 1936; 1948; 1952; 1956; 1960; 1964; 1968; 1972; 1976; 1980; 1984; 1988; 1992; 1996; 2000; 2004; 2008; 2012; 2016; 2020; 2024

Liechtenstein competed at the 2012 Summer Olympics in London, from 27 July to 12 August 2012. This was the nation's sixteenth appearance at the Olympics, excluding the 1956 Summer Olympics in Melbourne, and the 1980 Summer Olympics in Moscow because of the United States boycott.

The National Olympic Committee of Liechtenstein (German: Liechtensteinischer Olympischer Sportverband, LOS) sent a team of three athletes to the Games to compete in their respective sporting events. Marathon runner Marcel Tschopp, who competed at his second consecutive Olympics, became the oldest member of the contingent, at age 38. Liechtenstein also set a historical milestone for female athletes to participate for the first time in judo and in swimming at the Olympics. Swimmer and former Youth Olympic Games athlete Julia Hassler, who qualified for two of her freestyle events, was the youngest member of the contingent, at age 19. Meanwhile, tennis player Stephanie Vogt, who became Liechtenstein's flag bearer at the opening ceremony, had been granted a Tripartite Commission invitation from the International Tennis Federation (ITF) to compete in London.

Liechtenstein, however, has yet to win its first ever Summer Olympic medal, despite having won numerous medals at the Winter Olympics.

== Athletics ==
Key

- Note–Ranks given for track events are within the athlete's heat only
- Q = Qualified for the next round
- q = Qualified for the next round as a fastest loser or, in field events, by position without achieving the qualifying target
- NR = National record
- N/A = Round not applicable for the event
- Bye = Athlete not required to compete in round

Men

Athlete	Event	Final	
Athlete	Event	Result	Rank
Marcel Tschopp	Marathon	2:28:54	75

== Swimming ==
Swimmers from Liechtenstein have so far achieved qualifying standards in the following events (up to a maximum of 2 swimmers in each event at the Olympic Qualifying Time (OQT), and 1 at the Olympic Selection Time (OST)):

Women

Athlete	Event	Heat		Final	
Athlete	Event	Time	Rank	Time	Rank
Julia Hassler	400 m freestyle	4:12.99 NR	27	Did not advance	
Julia Hassler	800 m freestyle	8:35.18 NR	17	Did not advance	

== Tennis ==
Liechtenstein has been given a wild card.

Athlete	Event	Round of 64	Round of 32	Round of 16	Quarterfinals	Semifinals	Final	
Athlete	Event	Opposition Score	Opposition Score	Opposition Score	Opposition Score	Opposition Score	Opposition Score	Rank
Stephanie Vogt	Women's singles	Tatishvili (GEO); L 2–6, 0–6	Did not advance					
