= Liechtenstein at the 1996 Summer Olympics =

- IOC code: LIE
- NOC: Liechtenstein Olympic Committee
- Website: www.olympic.li (in German and English)

in Atlanta
- Competitors: 2 in 2 sports
- Flag bearer: Birgit Blum
- Medals: Gold 0 Silver 0 Bronze 0 Total 0

Summer Olympics appearances (overview)
- 1936; 1948; 1952; 1956; 1960; 1964; 1968; 1972; 1976; 1980; 1984; 1988; 1992; 1996; 2000; 2004; 2008; 2012; 2016; 2020; 2024

Liechtenstein competed at the 1996 Summer Olympics in Atlanta, United States.

== Results by event ==
=== Athletics ===
Women's Competition

- Manuela Marxer

=== Judo ===
Women's Competition

- Birgit Blum
