= Zsuzsa Nagy =

Zsuzsa Nagy may refer to:

- Zsuzsa Nagy (gymnast)
- Zsuzsa Nagy (judoka)
- Zsuzsa Szabó, née Nagy, Hungarian runner
