= Adolf Schreiber =

Liechtensteiner cyclist (1913–1983)

- Obituary portrait

Personal information
- Born: 31 August 1913 Schaan, Liechtenstein
- Died: 20 August 1983 (aged 69) Triesen, Liechtenstein

Cycling career
- Sport: Cycling
- Discipline: Road

Adolf Schreiber (31 August 1913 – 20 August 1983) was a Liechtensteiner cyclist and labourer. An avid sportsman growing up, he co-founded the Schaan Cycling Club and found local and international success in competition. He competed at the 1936 Summer Olympics representing Liechtenstein, becoming one of the first athletes for Liechtenstein at an Olympic Games. He would also make a bid to compete at the 1952 Summer Olympics but was unsuccessful.

== Early life ==
Adolf Schreiber was born on 31 August 1913 in Schaan, Liechtenstein, to mother Berta Schreiber. After his schooling, he failed to find an apprenticeship due to hardships brought on by the Great Depression and instead became a labourer at the textile factory Jenny, Spoerry & Cie. Schreiber was also an avid sportsman growing up and later co-founded the Schaan Cycling Club with four other cyclists on 10 February 1927.

== Career ==
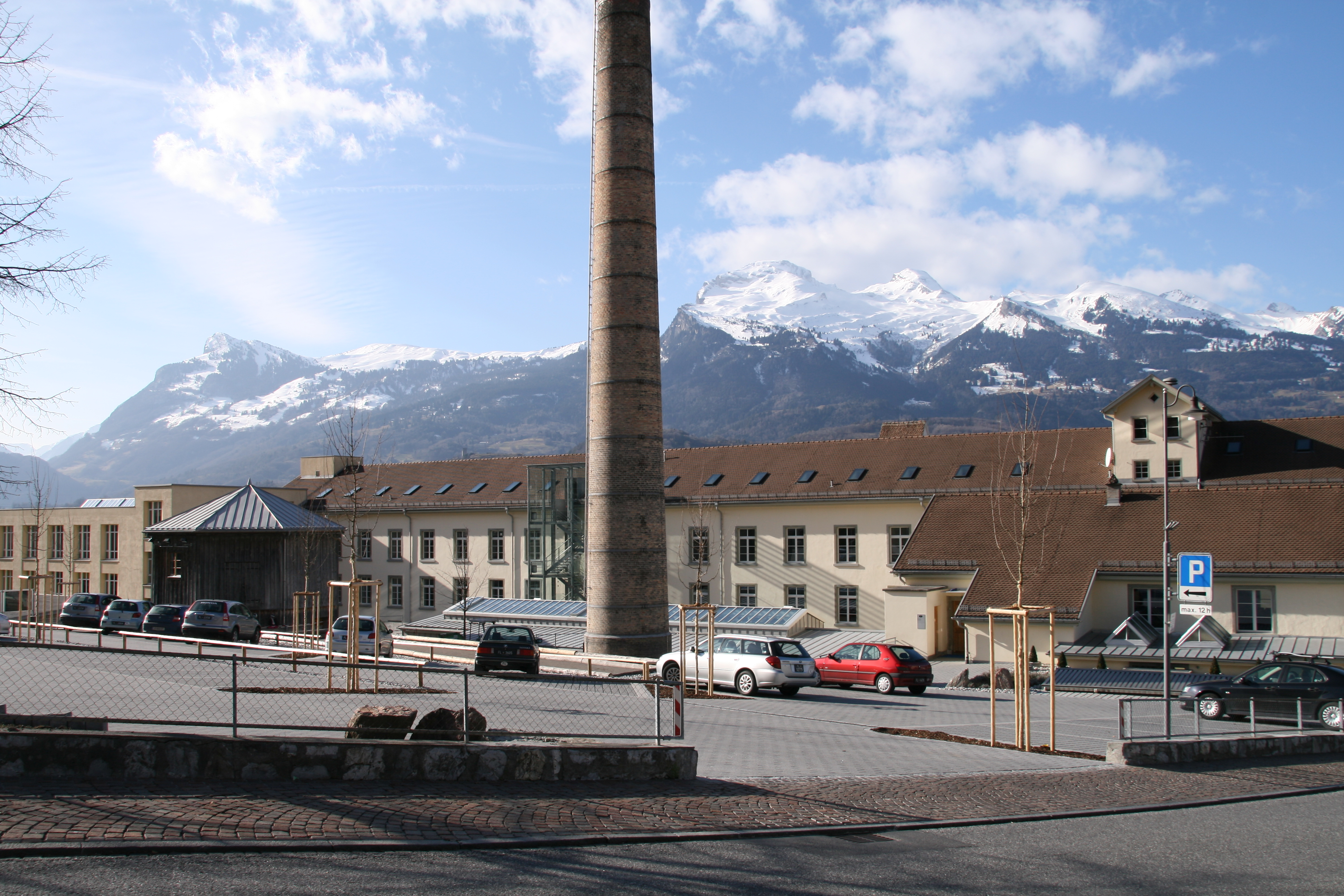
The original location of Jenny, Spoerry & Cie, where Schreiber worked

Among Schreiber's competitions as part of the club was the second iteration of Rund um Liechtenstein (transl. Around Liechtenstein) held in October 1935. He placed as the first Liechtensteiner and second overall cyclist to finish the race and was awarded with veronicas. Around this time, he left the factory and worked on the construction of the Liechtenstein inland canal and later as a labourer in a quarry. Though, he returned for work at Jenny, Spoerry & Cie. The following year he relocated to Mühleholz and competed at Liechtenstein's Olympic qualifiers. He placed first in the 15 kilometre race in 38 minutes and 8 seconds and was selected to compete for Liechtenstein at the 1936 Summer Olympics in Berlin for their maiden appearance.

Schreiber was entered to compete in the third iteration of Rund um Liechtenstein but was barred by organizers to prevent him from being injured leading up to the Olympics. In the same year, Schreiber married Klara Bühler. At the Games, he competed in the men's road race and was part of the leading group for the alongside 11 other cyclists. Around 60 kilometres into the race, his tire had gotten punctured near Priort and had to repair it, thus losing time. A few yards before the finish line, Schreiber was caught in a mass crash which made his ranking undeterminable.

After the Games, he competed at the Radrennen nur für Liechtensteiner (lit. 'Cycling race only for Liechtensteiners') and the Liechtenstein Mountain Championship, which was part of the first Liechtenstein Sports Festival in 1937. He placed first and eighth respectively. The following year, Schreiber was in a cycling accident while cycling on an unfinished road and fractured his skull; he was sent to Grabs Hospital. In the 1940s a cycling stadium, the Stadion Adolf Schreiber (transl. Adolf Schreiber Stadium), was named after him and in 1948, he divorced Bühler; they had two children, Helen and Klärli.

Sixteen years after his Olympic participation, he was entered to compete in Liechtenstein's Olympic qualifiers in hopes to participate in the 1952 Summer Olympics in Helsinki. Ultimately, only Alois Lampert and Ewald Hasler were selected for the Games. The following month, he was awarded a pewter plate bearing the coat of arms by Prince Franz Joseph II in recognition of his career in cycling.

== Later life and death ==
Schreiber later opened a bicycle repair shop while working at Jenny, Spoerry & Cie before moving to Triesen. He worked at the factory around 30 to 40 years before retiring, focusing on gardening and repairing items in a workshop. He was anointed before his death on 20 August 1983; he was buried in Triesen.
