= Elkuch =

Elkuch is a surname. Notable people with the surname include:

- Herbert Elkuch (born 1952), Liechtenstein politician
- Philipp Elkuch (1887–1956), Liechtenstein politician
- Yvonne Elkuch (born 1968), Liechtensteiner cyclist
