= Liechtenstein at the 1968 Summer Olympics =

- IOC code: LIE
- NOC: Liechtenstein Olympic Committee

in Mexico City, Mexico 12–27 October 1968
- Competitors: 2 (2 men and 0 women) in 1 sport
- Medals: Gold 0 Silver 0 Bronze 0 Total 0

Summer Olympics appearances (overview)
- 1936; 1948; 1952; 1956; 1960; 1964; 1968; 1972; 1976; 1980; 1984; 1988; 1992; 1996; 2000; 2004; 2008; 2012; 2016; 2020; 2024

Liechtenstein competed at the 1968 Summer Olympics in Mexico City, Mexico. It was the nation's sixth appearance at the Summer Olympics since its debut in the 1936 Summer Olympics. The delegation consisted of two athletes competing in athletics, neither of whom won any medals.

== Background ==
The 1968 Olympic Games were held from 12 October to 27 October 1968 in Mexico City, Mexico. This edition of the Games marked the nation's sixth appearance at the Summer Olympics since its debut at the 1936 Summer Olympics in Berlin and after boycotting the 1956 Summer Olympics due to the Hungarian Revolution of 1956. The nation's delegation consisted of two athletes competing in one sport, athletics. Liechtenstein did not win any medals during the Mexico City Olympics.

== Athletics ==
Liechtenstein sent two athletes to compete at the 1968 Olympics in athletics; Xaver Frick Jr. and Franz Biedermann. Frick competed in both the men's 800 m and men's 1500 m events. In the 800 metres, which took place on 13 October, he was placed in heat six for the heats round and completed his race in a time of 1:52.6, finishing in seventh place. In the 1500 metres, which took place on 18 October, he was placed in heat three for the heats round and completed his race in a time of 4:15.3, finishing in ninth place. Neither were sufficient to advance to semifinals.

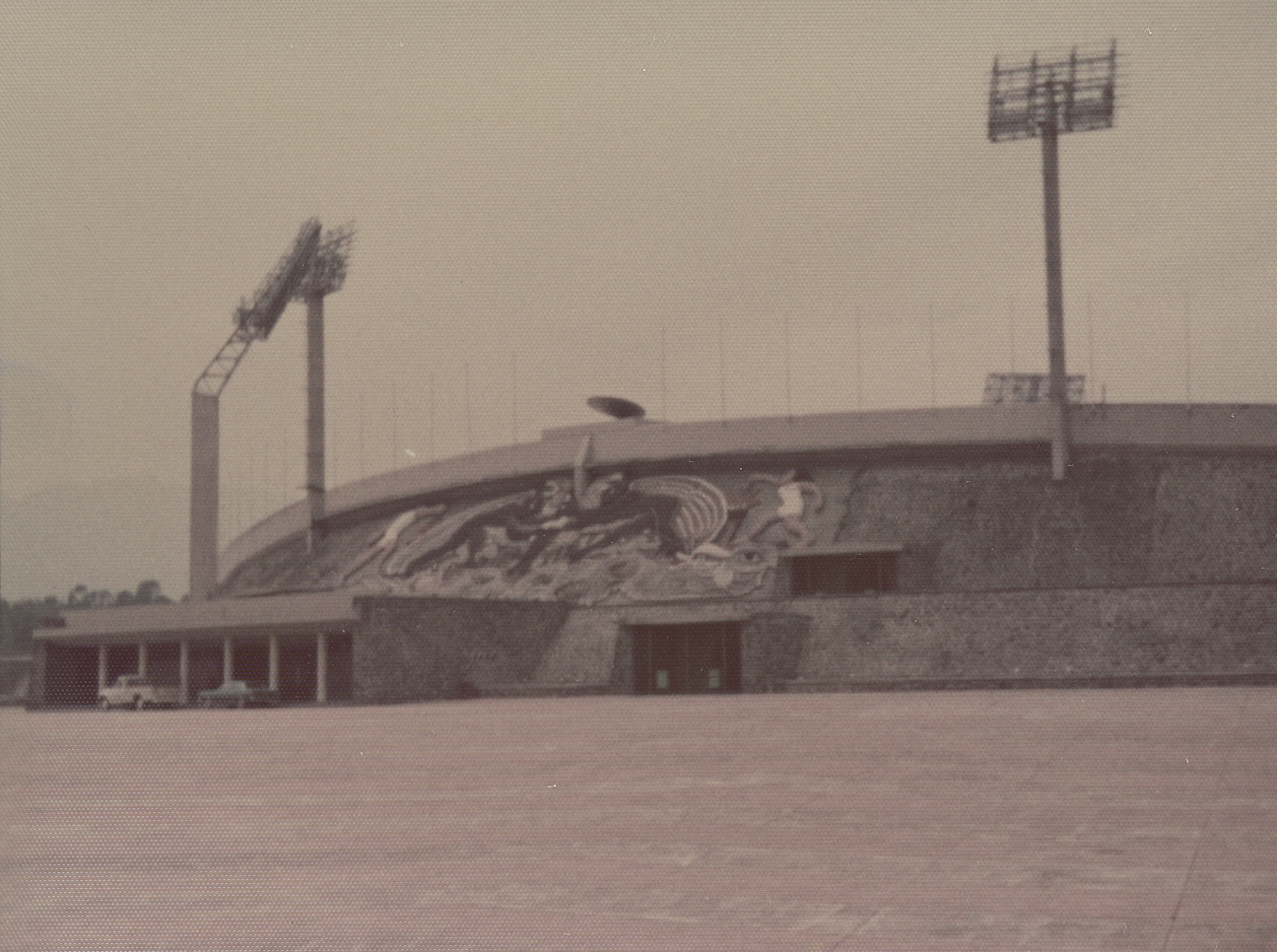
The exterior of the decathlon host stadium, the Estadio Olímpico Universitario, in Mexico City

Biedermann competed in the men's decathlon, taking place over two days from 18 October to 19 October in which he achieved a total of 6323 points getting 19th place. He received 687 points in the 100 metres, 671 in long jump, 528 in shot put, 588 in high jump, 744 in the 400 metres, 797 in the 110 metres hurdles, 489 in discus throw, 780 in pole vault, 563 in javelin throw, and 476 in the 1500 metres.

Key

- Note–Ranks given for track events are within the athlete's heat only
- Q = Qualified for the next round
- q = Qualified for the next round as a fastest loser or, in field events, by position without achieving the qualifying target
- NR = National record
- N/A = Round not applicable for the event
- Bye = Athlete not required to compete in round
- DNF = Did not finish

Track and decathlon events
| Athlete | Event | Heats | | Semifinal | | Final | |
| Athlete | Event | Result | Rank | Result | Rank | Result | Rank |
|---|---|---|---|---|---|---|---|
| Xaver Frick Jr. | Men's 800 m | 1:52.6 | 7 | Did not advance | | | |
| Xaver Frick Jr. | Men's 1500 m | 4:15.3 | 9 | Did not advance | | | |
| Franz Biedermann | Men's decathlon | —N/a | | | | 6323 | 19 |
