= Liechtenstein at the 2004 Summer Olympics =

- IOC code: LIE
- NOC: Liechtenstein Olympic Committee
- Website: www.olympic.li (in German and English)

in Athens
- Competitors: 1 in 1 sport
- Flag bearer: Oliver Geissmann
- Medals: Gold 0 Silver 0 Bronze 0 Total 0

Summer Olympics appearances (overview)
- 1936; 1948; 1952; 1956; 1960; 1964; 1968; 1972; 1976; 1980; 1984; 1988; 1992; 1996; 2000; 2004; 2008; 2012; 2016; 2020; 2024

Liechtenstein competed at the 2004 Summer Olympics in Athens, Greece, from 13 to 29 August 2004. This was the nation's sixteenth appearance at the Olympics, excluding the 1956 Summer Olympics in Melbourne, and the 1980 Summer Olympics in Moscow because of the United States boycott.

The National Olympic Committee of Liechtenstein (German: Liechtensteinischer Olympischer Sportverband, LOS) sent a single athlete to the Games. The spot was filled by rifle shooter Oliver Geissmann, who later carried the nation's flag in the opening ceremony.

== Shooting ==
Liechtenstein has qualified a single shooter.

Men

Athlete	Event	Qualification		Final	
Athlete	Event	Points	Rank	Points	Rank
Oliver Geissmann	10 m air rifle	591	=22	did not advance	
