= Liechtenstein at the 1972 Summer Olympics =

- IOC code: LIE
- NOC: Liechtenstein Olympic Committee

in Munich, West Germany 6 August – 11 September 1972
- Competitors: 6 in 4 sports
- Medals: Gold 0 Silver 0 Bronze 0 Total 0

Summer Olympics appearances (overview)
- 1936; 1948; 1952; 1956; 1960; 1964; 1968; 1972; 1976; 1980; 1984; 1988; 1992; 1996; 2000; 2004; 2008; 2012; 2016; 2020; 2024

Liechtenstein competed at the 1972 Summer Olympics in Munich, West Germany. Six competitors, all men, took part in eleven events in four sports.

== Cycling ==
One cyclist represented Liechtenstein in 1972.

Individual road race

- Paul Kind – did not finish (→ no ranking)

== Gymnastics ==
Men's Competition

- Bruno Banzer

== Judo ==
Men's Competition

- Armin Büchel
- Hansjakob Schädler

== Shooting ==
Two male shooters represented Liechtenstein in 1972.

50 m rifle, prone

- Louis Frommelt
- Remo Sele
