= Yelena Petrova =

Russian judoka (born 1966)

Personal information
- Born: 13 October 1966 (age 60)
- Occupation: Judoka

Sport
- Country: Russia
- Sport: Judo
- Weight class: ‍–‍61 kg

Achievements and titles
- Olympic Games: (bronze) (1992)
- World Champ.: (silver) (1989)
- European Champ.: (bronze) (1992)
Medal record
Women's judo
Representing Unified Team
Olympic Games
Bronze medal – third place	1992 Barcelona	‍–‍61 kg
Representing Soviet Union
World Championships
Silver medal – second place	1989 Belgrade	‍–‍61 kg
Representing CIS
European Championships
Bronze medal – third place	1992 Paris	‍–‍61 kg

Profile at external databases
- IJF: 54723
- JudoInside.com: 597
- Updated on 5 June 2023

Yelena Petrova (born 13 October 1966) is a Russian former judoka who won a bronze medal in the 1992 Summer Olympics. Petrova won bronze as well at the 1994 Goodwill Games After ending her career in 2000 she became a judo coach.
