= Nadia Marchi =

Sammarinese sports shooter

Personal information
- Nationality: Sammarinese
- Born: 7 February 1963 (age 63)

Sport
- Sport: Sports shooting
Medal record
Women's Shooting
Representing San Marino
Games of the Small States of Europe
Bronze medal – third place	2003 Malta	10 m air pistol
Bronze medal – third place	2005 Andorra	10 m air pistol

Nadia Marchi (born 7 February 1963) is a Sammarinese sports shooter. She competed in the women's 10 metre air pistol event at the 1996 Summer Olympics.
