= Liechtenstein at the 2020 Summer Olympics =

- IOC code: LIE
- NOC: Liechtenstein Olympic Committee
- Website: www.olympic.li (in German and English)

in Tokyo, Japan 23 July 2021 – 8 August 2021
- Competitors: 5 in 3 sports
- Flag bearers (opening): Julia Hassler; Raphael Schwendinger
- Flag bearer (closing): Lara Mechnig
- Medals: Gold 0 Silver 0 Bronze 0 Total 0

Summer Olympics appearances (overview)
- 1936; 1948; 1952; 1956; 1960; 1964; 1968; 1972; 1976; 1980; 1984; 1988; 1992; 1996; 2000; 2004; 2008; 2012; 2016; 2020; 2024

Liechtenstein competed at the 2020 Summer Olympics in Tokyo. Originally scheduled to take place from 24 July to 9 August 2020, the Games were postponed to 23 July to 8 August 2021 because of the COVID-19 pandemic. Since the nation's official debut in 1936, Liechtensteiner athletes have appeared in every edition of the Summer Olympic Games, except for two occasions; Liechtenstein did not register any athletes at the 1956 Summer Olympics in Melbourne, and eventually joined the United States-led boycott when Moscow hosted the 1980 Summer Olympics.

== Competitors ==
The following is the list of number of competitors participating in the Games:

Sport	Men	Women	Total
Artistic swimming	—	2	2
Judo	1	0	1
Swimming	1	1	2
Total	2	3	5

== Artistic swimming ==
For the first time in Olympic history, Liechtenstein fielded a squad of two artistic swimmers to compete in the women's duet event, by finishing eighth and securing the seventh of eight available spots at the 2021 FINA Olympic Qualification Tournament in Barcelona, Spain.

Athlete	Event	Technical routine		Free routine (preliminary)			Free routine (final)		
Athlete	Event	Points	Rank	Points	Total (technical + free)	Rank	Points	Total (technical + free)	Rank
Lara Mechnig; Marluce Schierscher	Duet	83.2489	16	83.0333	166.2822	17	Did not advance		

== Judo ==
Liechtenstein qualified one judoka for the men's middleweight category (90 kg) at the Games, marking the nation's return to the sport for the first time in two decades. Raphael Schwendinger accepted a continental berth from Europe as the nation's top-ranked judoka outside of direct qualifying position in the IJF World Ranking List of June 28, 2021.

Athlete	Event	Round of 64	Round of 32	Round of 16	Quarterfinals	Semifinals	Repechage	Final / BM	
Athlete	Event	Opposition Result	Opposition Result	Opposition Result	Opposition Result	Opposition Result	Opposition Result	Opposition Result	Rank
Raphael Schwendinger	Men's –90 kg	Bye	Brown (USA); L 00–11	Did not advance					

== Swimming ==
Liechtensteinian swimmers further achieved qualifying standards in the following events (up to a maximum of 2 swimmers in each event at the Olympic Qualifying Time (OQT), and potentially 1 at the Olympic Selection Time (OST)):

Athlete	Event	Heat		Semifinal		Final	
Athlete	Event	Time	Rank	Time	Rank	Time	Rank
Christoph Meier	Men's 200 m individual medley	2:04.34	44	Did not advance			
Christoph Meier	Men's 400 m individual medley	4:25.17	28	—		Did not advance	
Julia Hassler	Women's 400 m freestyle	4:06.98	12	—		Did not advance	
Julia Hassler	Women's 800 m freestyle	8:26.99	15	—		Did not advance	
Julia Hassler	Women's 1500 m freestyle	16:12.55	16	—		Did not advance	
