= Liechtenstein at the 1948 Summer Olympics =

- IOC code: LIE
- NOC: Liechtenstein Olympic Committee

in London, Great Britain July 29–August 14, 1948
- Competitors: 2 in 1 sport
- Medals: Gold 0 Silver 0 Bronze 0 Total 0

Summer Olympics appearances (overview)
- 1936; 1948; 1952; 1956; 1960; 1964; 1968; 1972; 1976; 1980; 1984; 1988; 1992; 1996; 2000; 2004; 2008; 2012; 2016; 2020; 2024

Liechtenstein competed at the 1948 Summer Olympics in London, United Kingdom, which was held from 29 July to 14 August 1948. This was the country's second appearance in a Summer Olympic Games, following their debut at the 1936 edition in Berlin. Liechtenstein's delegation consisted of two male competitors: Gebhard Büchel and Josef Seger, who both competed in the men's decathlon event. Neither competitor finished the event, and thus the country failed to win any medals in this Games appearance.

== Background ==
The formation of the Liechtenstein Olympic Committee began in 1934 at the behest of Baron Eduard von Falz-Fein, who had visited Lausanne and was asked by the President of the Swiss Olympic Association why Liechtenstein didn't have a committee. The committee was officially founded in 1935 and recognised by the International Olympic Committee in the same year. Liechtenstein made their Olympics debut at the 1936 Winter Olympics in Garmisch-Partenkirchen, Germany, and their Summer Olympics debut a few months later in Berlin, Germany.

The 1948 Summer Olympics were the first Summer Olympics held since the 1940 and 1944 editions were cancelled due to World War II. The Games took place in London, Great Britain, and were held from 29 July to 14 August 1948. The London Games hosted 4,104 athletes in 139 different events from 59 countries.

At the Games, Peter Casson and P. Lubbock served as the nation's attachés. Liechtenstein were housed in Uxbridge with 13 other delegations, including hosts Great Britain.

== Athletics ==
Both of Liechtenstein's athletes competed in the men's decathlon event at the Games. Gebhard Büchel previously competed at the men's decathlon event at the 1946 European Athletics Championships in Oslo, Norway. At the Games, Büchel posted a time of 12.7 seconds in the 100 metre dash, 5.55 metres in the long jump, 10.36 metres in the shot put, and 1.4 metres in the high jump before retiring from the competition. Based on those times, distances, and heights, Büchel compiled a total of 1,766 points before bowing out. Josef Seger was a student in London studying language at the time. Seger finished with a 12.3-second 100-metre time, 5.945 metres in the long jump, 9.4 metres in the shot put, 1.65 metres in the high jump, 55.7 seconds in the 400 metre dash, 18.7 seconds in the 110 metre hurdles, and 28.6 metres in the discus throw before retiring from the competition early. He finished with 3,579 points.

Combined event – Men's decathlon

| Athlete | Event | 100 m | LJ | SP | HJ | 400 m | 110H | DT | PV | JT | 1500 m | Final | Rank |
|---|---|---|---|---|---|---|---|---|---|---|---|---|---|
| Gebhard Büchel | Result | 12.7 | 5.55 | 10.36 | 1.40 | – | – | – | – | – | – | – | DNF |
| Gebhard Büchel | Points | 464 | 457 | 477 | 368 | – | – | – | – | – | – | – | DNF |
| Josef Seger | Result | 12.30 | 5.945 | 9.40 | 1.65 | 55.70 | 18.70 | 28.60 | – | – | – | – | DNF |
| Josef Seger | Points | 536 | 543 | 398 | 616 | 597 | 485 | 404 | – | – | – | – | DNF |
