= Thant Phyu Phyu =

Burmese judoka

Personal information
- Nationality: Burmese
- Born: 28 September 1966 (age 58)

Sport
- Sport: Judo

Thant Phyu Phyu (born 28 September 1966) is a Burmese judoka. She competed in the women's half-middleweight event at the 1992 Summer Olympics.
