= Debbie Warren-Jeans =

Zimbabwean judoka (born 1964)

Personal information
- Nationality: Zimbabwean
- Born: 28 June 1964 (age 62)

Sport
- Sport: Judo

Debbie Warren-Jeans (born 28 June 1964) is a Zimbabwean judoka. She competed in the women's half-middleweight event at the 1992 Summer Olympics.
