= Gu Hyeon-suk =

South Korean judoka (born 1969)

Personal information
- Nationality: South Korean
- Born: 28 May 1969 (age 55)

Sport
- Sport: Judo

Gu Hyeon-suk (born 28 May 1969) is a South Korean judoka. She competed in the women's half-middleweight event at the 1992 Summer Olympics at 23.
