= Tânia Ishii =

Brazilian judoka (born 1968)

Personal information
- Born: 30 October 1968 (age 56); São Paulo, Brazil

Sport
- Sport: Judo

Tânia Ishii (born 30 October 1968) is a Brazilian judoka. She competed in the women's half-middleweight event at the 1992 Summer Olympics.
