= Gisela Hämmerling =

Swiss judoka

Personal information
- Nationality: Swiss
- Born: 26 December 1969 (age 55)

Sport
- Sport: Judo

Gisela Hämmerling (born 26 December 1969) is a Swiss judoka. She competed in the women's half-middleweight event at the 1992 Summer Olympics.
