= Romano Püntener =

Liechtenstein cyclist (born 2004)

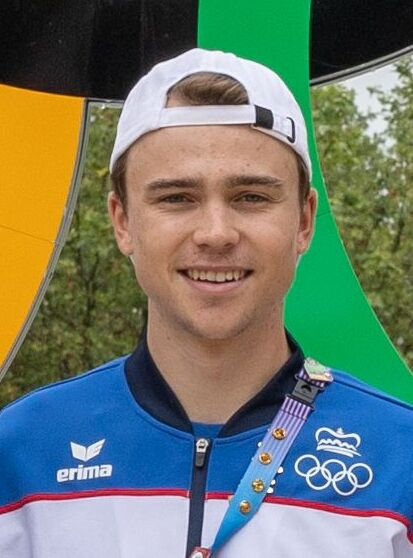
- Püntener in 2024

Personal information
- Born: 26 February 2004 (age 22)

Cycling career
- Sport: Cycling
- Current team: Thömus Akros–Youngstars
- Discipline: Mountain bike
- Role: Rider

Professional team
- 2023–: Thömus Akros–Youngstars
Medal record
Representing Liechtenstein
Men's mountain biking
Games of the Small States of Europe
Gold medal – first place	Andorra la Vella 2025	Cross-country
Silver medal – second place	Andorra la Vella 2025	Team Cross-country

Romano Püntener (born 26 February 2004) is a mountain biker from Liechtenstein. He competed at the 2024 Summer Olympics, and was also Liechtenstein's flag bearer at the opening ceremony. He was the only athlete to represent Liechtenstein at this edition. He ultimately finished 28th and failed to win an Olympic medal.

During his time in the Olympics, Püntener was reported by the BBC as having befriended tennis player Andy Murray. In 2022, he was voted the Liechtenstein Sportsman of the Year. He is from Schaan.

== Major results ==
2020
1st Cross-country, National Championships
2021
1st Cross-country, National Championships
2022
1st Cross-country, National Championships
2023
1st Cross-country, National Championships

== See also ==
- Liechtenstein at the 2024 Summer Olympics
