= Liechtenstein at the 2016 Summer Olympics =

- IOC code: LIE
- NOC: Liechtenstein Olympic Committee
- Website: www.olympic.li (in German and English)

in Rio de Janeiro
- Competitors: 3 in 2 sports
- Flag bearers: Julia Hassler (opening); Christoph Meier (closing)
- Medals: Gold 0 Silver 0 Bronze 0 Total 0

Summer Olympics appearances (overview)
- 1936; 1948; 1952; 1956; 1960; 1964; 1968; 1972; 1976; 1980; 1984; 1988; 1992; 1996; 2000; 2004; 2008; 2012; 2016; 2020; 2024

Liechtenstein competed at the 2016 Summer Olympics in Rio de Janeiro, Brazil, from 5 to 21 August 2016. Since the nation's official debut in 1936, Liechtensteinian athletes have appeared in every edition of the Summer Olympic Games, except for two occasions. Liechtenstein did not register any athletes at the 1956 Summer Olympics in Melbourne, and eventually joined the United States-led boycott when Moscow hosted the 1980 Summer Olympics. The 2016 delegation included two swimmers, Christoph Meier and Julia Hassler, and tennis player Stephanie Vogt. Two of the athletes debuted in the 2012 Summer Olympics, with long-distance freestyle swimmer Julia Hassler leading the squad as the nation's flag bearer in the opening ceremony. Liechtenstein has yet to win a Summer Olympic medal.

== Background ==
Liechtenstein participated in seventeen Summer Olympic Games between its debut in the 1936 Summer Olympics in Berlin, Germany, and the 2016 Summer Olympics in Rio de Janeiro, Brazil. The highest number of Liechtensteiners participating at any one Summer Games was 12 in the 1988 Summer Olympics in Seoul, South Korea. No Liechtensteiner has ever won a medal at the Summer Olympics. However, Liechtenstein has won nine medals at the Winter Olympic Games. All of the Liechtensteiner participants competed at the 2016 Summer Olympics through invitations by FINA or the ITF. Hassler was chosen to be Liechtenstein's flag bearer during the Parade of Nations of the opening ceremony while Meier bore the flag during the closing ceremony.

== Swimming ==
Liechtenstein received a universality invitation from FINA to send two swimmers (one male and one female) to the Olympics. Christoph Meier made his Olympic debut by competing in the men's 400 m individual medley event while Julia Hassler made her second appearance, with the first being in London 2012. At the 2012 Summer Olympics, she was one of three athletes to compete for Liechtenstein. She swam the 400 and 800 freestyles, finishing twenty-seventh in the 400 and 17th in the 800. Meier finished eighth in his heat and twenty-second overall with a time of 4:19.19 seconds, which set a national record but did not qualify him for the finals. Hassler started in the second lane. She came second in her heat and twenty-first overall with a time of 8:38.19 seconds. Hassler was eight seconds off the slowest qualifying time of 8:25.55 seconds by Mireia Belmonte of Spain.

Athlete	Event	Heat		Final	
Athlete	Event	Time	Rank	Time	Rank
Christoph Meier	Men's 400 m individual medley	4:19.19	22	did not advance	
Julia Hassler	Women's 800 m freestyle	8:38.19	21	did not advance	

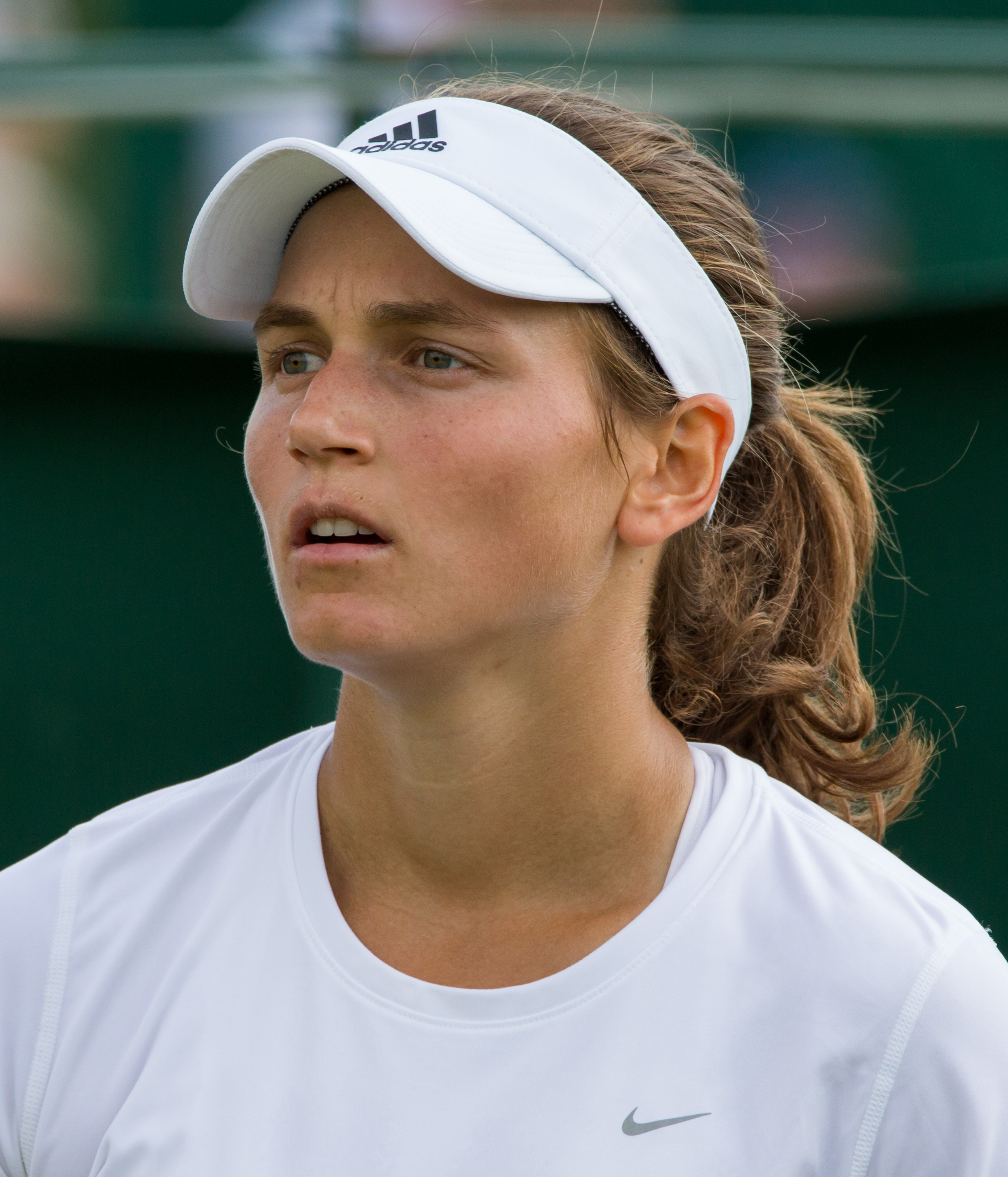
Stephanie Vogt competing in the first round of the 2015 Wimbledon Qualifying Tournament at the Bank of England Sports Grounds in Roehampton, England.

== Tennis ==
Liechtenstein received an invitation from the Tripartite Commission to send London 2012 Olympian Stephanie Vogt (world no. 274) in the women's singles for her second time into the Olympic tennis tournament. In the round of 64, Vogt lost both sets, losing the first 3–6 and the second 1–6 against Johanna Konta of Great Britain. Konta reached the quarterfinals after she beat Svetlana Kuznetsova of Russia in the third round, but was knocked out in the last eight by Angelique Kerber of Germany. Following the loss, Vogt announced that she would pause her tennis career and enroll in the Swiss Federal Institute of Technology in Zürich.

Athlete	Event	Round of 64	Round of 32	Round of 16	Quarterfinals	Semifinals	Final / BM	
Athlete	Event	Opposition Score	Opposition Score	Opposition Score	Opposition Score	Opposition Score	Opposition Score	Rank
Stephanie Vogt	Women's singles	Konta (GBR); L 3–6, 1–6	did not advance					
