= Shooting at the 2005 Games of the Small States of Europe =

== Target Shooting ==
Event	Gold	Silver	Bronze
Air Rifle Men	Oliver Geissmann (LIE)	Marc-André Kessler (LIE)	Jeff Alliaume (LUX)
Air Rifle Women	Fabienne Pasetti (MON)	Julia Kaiser (LIE)	Carole Calmes (LUX)
Air Pistol Men	Patrick Decker (LUX)	Isidoro Sanchez (AND)	Jackie Moret (MON)
Air Pistol Women	Cynthia Durand (MON)	Irene Panteli (CYP)	Nadia Marchi (SMR)

== Medal table ==
* Host nation (Andorra)

Rank	Nation	Gold	Silver	Bronze	Total
1	Monaco (MON)	2	0	1	3
2	Liechtenstein (LIE)	1	2	0	3
3	Luxembourg (LUX)	1	0	2	3
4	Andorra (AND)*	0	1	0	1
4	Cyprus (CYP)	0	1	0	1
6	San Marino (SMR)	0	0	1	1
Totals (6 entries)		4	4	4	12
