= Oskar Ospelt =

Liechtensteiner sportsman (1908–1988)

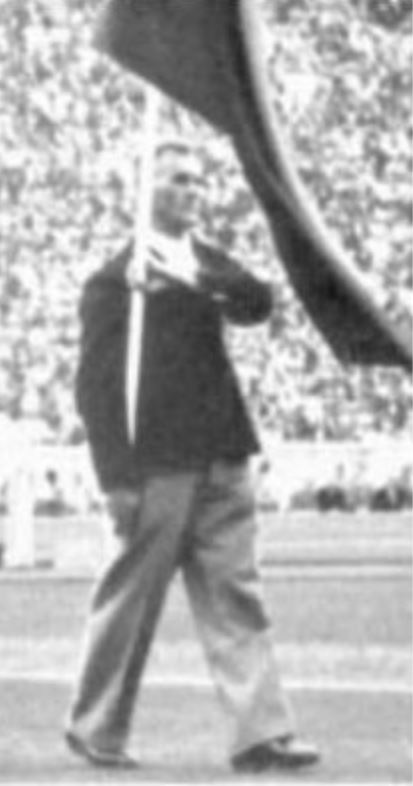
- Ospelt in 1936

Personal information
- Nationality: Liechtenstein
- Born: 27 July 1908 Hittisau, Austria-Hungary
- Died: 15 June 1988 (aged 79) Vaduz, Liechtenstein

Sport
- Sport: Sprinting, throwing
- Events: 100 metres, discus
Medal record
Men's athletics
Swiss Championships
Gold medal – first place	1937 Lucerne	Discus throw
Gold medal – first place	1938 Basel	Discus throw

Oskar Ospelt (Note: Swiss Standard German pronunciation: [ˈɔskar ˈɔspɛlt].) (27 July 1908 – 15 June 1988) was a Liechtensteiner sprinter and thrower. Domestically, Ospelt competed for the sports club Leichtathletik Club Vaduz. He competed at the 1936 Summer Olympics representing Liechtenstein in athletics, becoming one of the first athletes for Liechtenstein at an Olympic Games. He was a two-time Swiss national champion and later co-founded the Liechtenstein Gymnastic and Athletic Association.

== Biography ==
Oskar Ospelt was born on 27 July 1908 in Hittisau in what was then Austria-Hungary. Domestically, he competed for the sports club Leichtathletik Club Vaduz. Prior to the 1936 Summer Olympics, Liechtenstein held trials for athletics events. Xaver Frick and Ospelt took part in the trials. Frick won the races over 200, 400, and 800 metres, while Ospelt won the discus throw, javelin throw, and the 100 metres in a time of 11 seconds.

He competed at the Summer Games in Berlin, Germany, representing Liechtenstein in men's athletics. He was one of the first Liechtensteiner competitors to compete at an Olympic Games for the nation. (Note: Liechtenstein made their debut at these Summer Games.) Ospelt was the flag bearer for the nation during the opening ceremony of the Summer Games. He first competed in the heats of the men's 100 metres on 2 August against five other competitors. In his round, he placed last and did not advance to the quarterfinals of the event. His final event was the qualifying round for the men's discus throw on 5 August. He did not qualify for the finals after he failed to throw the discus far enough.

After the Summer Games, Ospelt competed at the 1937 Swiss Athletics Championships held in Lucerne and won the discus title. In the same year, he set two national records for Liechtenstein with marks of 11.3 seconds in the 100 metres and 13.07 metres (42.9 ft) in the shot put. He then competed at the 1938 Swiss Athletics Championships held in Basel on 23 June and was the best-performing athlete at the competition, winning the discus throw with a national record of 43.36 metres (142.3 ft) which still stands as of September 2025. He set a national record for the javelin throw the following year with a mark of 59.48 metres (195.1 ft).

He founded Rotary Club Liechtenstein and co-founded the Liechtenstein Gymnastic and Athletic Association, the former member of the International Amateur Athletic Federation for Liechtenstein. Ospelt died due to a serious illness on 15 June 1988 in Vaduz, Liechtenstein, at the age of 79.

== International competitions ==
Year	Competition	Venue	Position	Event	Notes
Representing Liechtenstein
1936	Olympic Games	Berlin, Germany	6th (h)	100 m	Unknown
1936	Olympic Games	Berlin, Germany	(q)	Discus throw	Unknown
1938	European Championships	Paris, France	15th	Discus throw	39.80 m
1938	European Championships	Paris, France	8th	Javelin throw	58.83 m
1946	European Championships	Oslo, Norway	16th (q)	Discus throw	38.35 m
1946	European Championships	Oslo, Norway	13th (q)	Javelin throw	52.73 m
1954	European Championships	Bern, Switzerland	23rd (q)	Discus throw	33.14 m

== See also ==
- Liechtenstein at the 1936 Summer Olympics
