= Liechtenstein at the 1976 Summer Olympics =

- IOC code: LIE
- NOC: Liechtenstein Olympic Committee

in Montreal, Canada July 17–August 1, 1976
- Competitors: 6 in 2 sports
- Medals: Gold 0 Silver 0 Bronze 0 Total 0

Summer Olympics appearances (overview)
- 1936; 1948; 1952; 1956; 1960; 1964; 1968; 1972; 1976; 1980; 1984; 1988; 1992; 1996; 2000; 2004; 2008; 2012; 2016; 2020; 2024; 2028

Liechtenstein competed at the 1976 Summer Olympics in Montreal, Quebec, Canada. It was the nation's eighth appearance at the Summer Olympics since its debut in the 1936 Summer Olympics. The delegation consisted of six athletes competing in two sports, athletics and judo. Liechtenstein did not win any medals during the Montreal Olympics. This was the first Summer Olympics where Liechtenstein sent any female athletes.

== Background ==
The 1976 Summer Olympics were held from 18 July to 1 August in Montreal, Quebec, Canada. This edition of the Games marked the nation's eighth appearance at the Summer Olympics since its debut at the 1936 Summer Olympics in Berlin and after boycotting the 1956 Summer Olympics due to the Hungarian Revolution of 1956. The nation's delegation consisted of six athletes competing in two sports, athletics and Judo. Liechtenstein did not win any medals during the Montreal Olympics. This was the first Summer Olympics where Liechtenstein sent any female athletes, the two female athletes they sent were twin sisters.

== Competitors ==
The following is the list of number of competitors for the nation at the Games.

Sport	Men	Women	Total
Athletics	1	2	3
Judo	3	0	3
Total	4	2	6

== Athletics ==
Liechtenstein sent three athletes to compete at the 1976 Olympics in athletics; Günther Hasler, and twins Helen and Maria Ritter, from Mauren. Hasler competed in both the men's 800 m and men's 1500 m events. In the 800 metres, which took place on 23 July, he was placed in heat three for the heats round and completed his race in a time of 1:48.83, finishing in fifth place. He failed to advance to Round 1. In the 1500 metres, which took place on 29 July, he was placed in heat two for the heats round and completed his race in a time of 3:39.34, finishing in seventh place. He failed to advance to Round 1.

Helen Ritter competed in both the women's 200 m and women's 400 m events. In the 200 metres, which took place on 26 July, she was placed in heat four for the heats round and completed her race in a time of 26.15, finishing in seventh place. She failed to advance to Round 1. In the 400 metres, which took place on 25 July, she was placed in heat five for the heats round and completed her race in a time of 58.52, finishing in sixth place. She failed to advance to Round 1.

Maria Ritter competed in both the women's 800 m and women's 1500 m events. In the 800 metres, which took place on 23 July, she was placed in heat three for the heats round and completed her race in a time of 2:14.39, finishing in seventh place. She failed to advance to Round 1. In the 1500 metres, which took place on 28 July, she was placed in heat one for the heats round and did not start her race. She failed to advance to Round 1.

Key

- Note–Ranks given for track events are within the athlete's heat only
- Q = Qualified for the next round
- q = Qualified for the next round as a fastest loser or, in field events, by position without achieving the qualifying target
- NR = National record
- N/A = Round not applicable for the event
- Bye = Athlete not required to compete in round
- DNF = Did not finish

Athlete	Event	Heats		Semifinal		Final	
Athlete	Event	Result	Rank	Result	Rank	Result	Rank
Günther Hasler	Men's 800 m	1:48.83	5	Did not advance			
Günther Hasler	Men's 1500 m	3:39.34	7	Did not advance			

Athlete	Event	Heats		Semifinal		Final	
Athlete	Event	Result	Rank	Result	Rank	Result	Rank
Helen Ritter	Women's 200 m	26.15	7	Did not advance			
Helen Ritter	Women's 400 m	58.52	6	Did not advance			
Maria Ritter	Women's 800 m	2:14.39	7	Did not advance			
Maria Ritter	Women's 1500 m	Did not start		Did not advance			

== Judo ==
Liechtenstein qualified three judokas for the Games. Fritz Kaiser, Paul Büchel, and Hans-Jakob Schädler.

Kaiser participated in the men's 80 kg event. On 28 July, he fought Walter Huber in the Round of 16 and lost in 0:27 to a Ashi-garami, failing to advance to the quarterfinals.

Büchel participated in the men's 93 kg event. On 27 July, he fought Antoni Reiter in the Round of 16 and lost in 4:44 to an Ude-hishigi-juji-gatame, failing to advance to the quarterfinals.

Schädler participated in both the men's +93 kg and men's open events. In the +93 kg event, he fought Abdoulaye Kote on 26 July, in the Round of 16, and lost in 6:00 to an Osotogari, failing to advance to the quarterfinals. In the open event, he fought Jimmy Wooly on 31 July, in the Round of 16, and lost in 2:27 to a Kesa-gatame, failing to advance to the quarterfinals.

Athlete	Event	Round 1	Quarterfinals	Semifinals	Repechage	Final / BM	
Athlete	Event	Opposition Result	Opposition Result	Opposition Result	Opposition Result	Opposition Result	Rank
Fritz Kaiser	Men's 80 kg	Huber (VEN); L	Did not advance				19
Paul Büchel	Men's 93 kg	Reiter (POL); L	Did not advance				18
Hans-Jakob Schädler	Men's +93 kg	Kote (SEN); L	Did not advance				17
Hans-Jakob Schädler	Men's open	Wooley (USA); L	Did not advance				16
