= Takako Kobayashi =

Japanese judoka (born 1968)

Personal information
- Nationality: Japanese
- Born: 2 April 1968 (age 58) Kyoto, Japan

Sport
- Sport: Judo
Medal record
Representing Japan
Women's judo
Asian Games
Silver medal – second place	1990 Beijing	–61 kg
World Championships
Bronze medal – third place	1989 Belgrade	–61 kg

Takako Kobayashi (小林 貴子, Kobayashi Takako; born 2 April 1968) is a Japanese judoka. She competed in the women's half-middleweight event at the 1992 Summer Olympics.
