= Shooting at the 2003 Games of the Small States of Europe =

== Medalists ==
=== Clay Shooting ===
Event	Gold		Silver		Bronze	
Trap	Francesco Amici (SMR)	141	Frans Pace (MLT)	140	George Landos (CYP)	139
Double Trap	William Chetcuti (MLT)	179	Maurizio Zonzini (SMR)	178	Emmanuel Grima (MLT)	171
Skeet	Antonis Nicolaides (CYP)	144	Paul Vella (MLT)	142	Achilleos George (CYP)	141

=== Target Shooting ===
Event	Gold		Silver		Bronze	
Air Rifle Men	Sacha Cirelli (LUX)	681.3	Jeff Alliaume (LUX)	679.8	Andreas Constantino (CYP)	678.9
Air Rifle Women	Carole Calmes (LUX)	179	Fani Theofanous (CYP)	178	Erika Ghiotti (MLT)	171
Air Pistol Men	Jean-Paul Schroeder (LUX)	658.2	Marcello Massaro (SMR)	648.0	Mirko Bugli (SMR)	647.4
Air Pistol Women	Marianne Meiers (LUX)	457.3	Irene Panteli (CYP)	455.5	Nadia Marchi (SMR)	449.9

== Medal table ==
* Host nation (Malta)

Rank	Nation	Gold	Silver	Bronze	Total
1	Monaco (MON)	2	1	0	3
2	Malta (MLT)*	1	2	1	4
3	Cyprus (CYP)	0	0	1	1
3	Iceland (ISL)	0	0	1	1
Totals (4 entries)		3	3	3	9
