= Lkhamaasürengiin Badamsüren =

Mongolian judoka (born 1972)

Personal information
- Nationality: Mongolian
- Born: 28 May 1972 (age 52)

Sport
- Sport: Judo

Lkhamaasürengiin Badamsüren (born 28 May 1972) is a Mongolian judoka. She competed in the women's half-middleweight event at the 1992 Summer Olympics.
