= Liechtenstein at the 2024 Summer Olympics =

Liechtenstein at the Games of the XXXIII Olympiad in Paris

- IOC code: LIE
- NOC: Liechtenstein Olympic Committee
- Website: www.olympic.li (in German and English)

in Paris, France 26 July 2024 – 11 August 2024
- Competitors: 1 (1 man) in 1 sport
- Flag bearer (opening): Romano Püntener
- Flag bearer (closing): Volunteer
- Medals: Gold 0 Silver 0 Bronze 0 Total 0

Summer Olympics appearances (overview)
- 1936; 1948; 1952; 1956; 1960; 1964; 1968; 1972; 1976; 1980; 1984; 1988; 1992; 1996; 2000; 2004; 2008; 2012; 2016; 2020; 2024

Liechtenstein competed at the 2024 Summer Olympics in Paris, France, which were held from 26 July to 11 August 2024. The country's participation in Paris marked its nineteenth appearance at the Summer Olympics since its debut in 1936, and after boycotting the 1956 and 1980 Summer Olympics.

The Liechtenstein athlete delegation consisted of one competitor, cyclist Romano Püntener, which tied for the smallest athlete delegation of a country at these Games. Püntener qualified through a universality slot given by the Union Cycliste Internationale. He was the flagbearer for the nation at the opening ceremony, while a volunteer held it at the closing ceremony. He competed in the men's cross-country event in mountain biking and placed 28th. Thus, Liechtenstein has yet to win a Summer Olympic medal.

== Background ==
The Games were held from 26 July to 11 August 2024, in the city of Paris, France. This edition of the Games marked the nation's nineteenth appearance at the Summer Olympics since its debut at the 1936 Summer Olympics, and after boycotting the 1956 Summer Olympics due to the Hungarian Revolution of 1956 and the 1980 Summer Olympics due to the Soviet invasion of Afghanistan. The nation had never won a medal at the Summer Olympics, with its only medals coming from the Winter Olympics.

In the lead-up to the Games, the Liechtenstein Olympic Committee created an employment programme in 2023 to support six of the nation's athletes. It provided athletes with a salary and social and financial security so that they could focus on their sports. The athletes that were first chosen for the programme were tennis player Kathinka von Deichmann, cross-country skier Robin Frommelt, alpine skiers Nico Gauer and Marco Pfiffner, mountain biker Romano Püntener, and racing driver Fabienne Wohlwend, due to the support from their sports' national federations and dedication to their respective sports.

=== Delegation ===
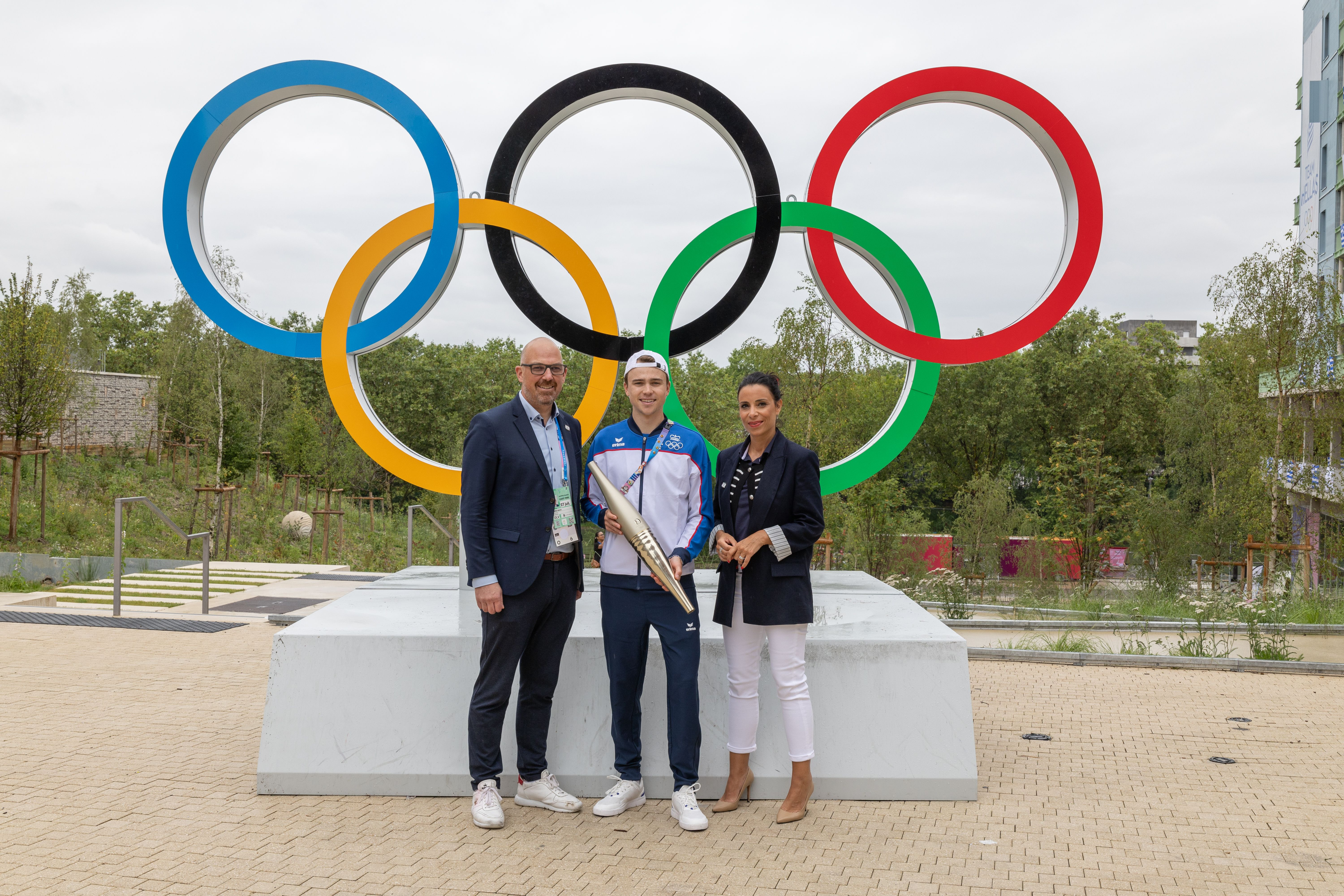
Prime Minister Daniel Risch (left), Romano Püntener (middle), and government councilor Dominique Hasler (right) at the Olympic Village

The Liechtenstein delegation was composed of three people. They traveled to Paris on 23 July. The official present at the Games was chef de mission Mathias Briker. A singular athlete qualified for the Games, Swiss-Liechtensteiner Romano Püntener, a mountain biker who competed in the men's cross-country event. Püntener was trained by Swiss former cyclist and Olympian Ralph Näf, who won a silver and bronze medal at the UCI Mountain Bike World Championships. The nation also tried to qualify tennis player Kathinka von Deichmann as a wild card, but failed to do so as Danka Kovinić of Montenegro earned the berth from the International Tennis Federation. The nation's athlete delegation at the Games tied with Belize, Nauru, and Somalia, for the fewest athletes of a country at the Games.

=== Opening and closing ceremonies ===
The Liechtenstein delegation came in 107th out of the 205 National Olympic Committees in the 2024 Summer Olympics Parade of Nations within the opening ceremony. Püntener held the flag for the delegation in the ceremony. At the closing ceremony, a volunteer held the flag.

== Competitors ==
The following is the list of number of competitors for the nation at the Games.

Sport	Men	Women	Total
Cycling	1	0	1
Total	1	0	1

== Cycling ==
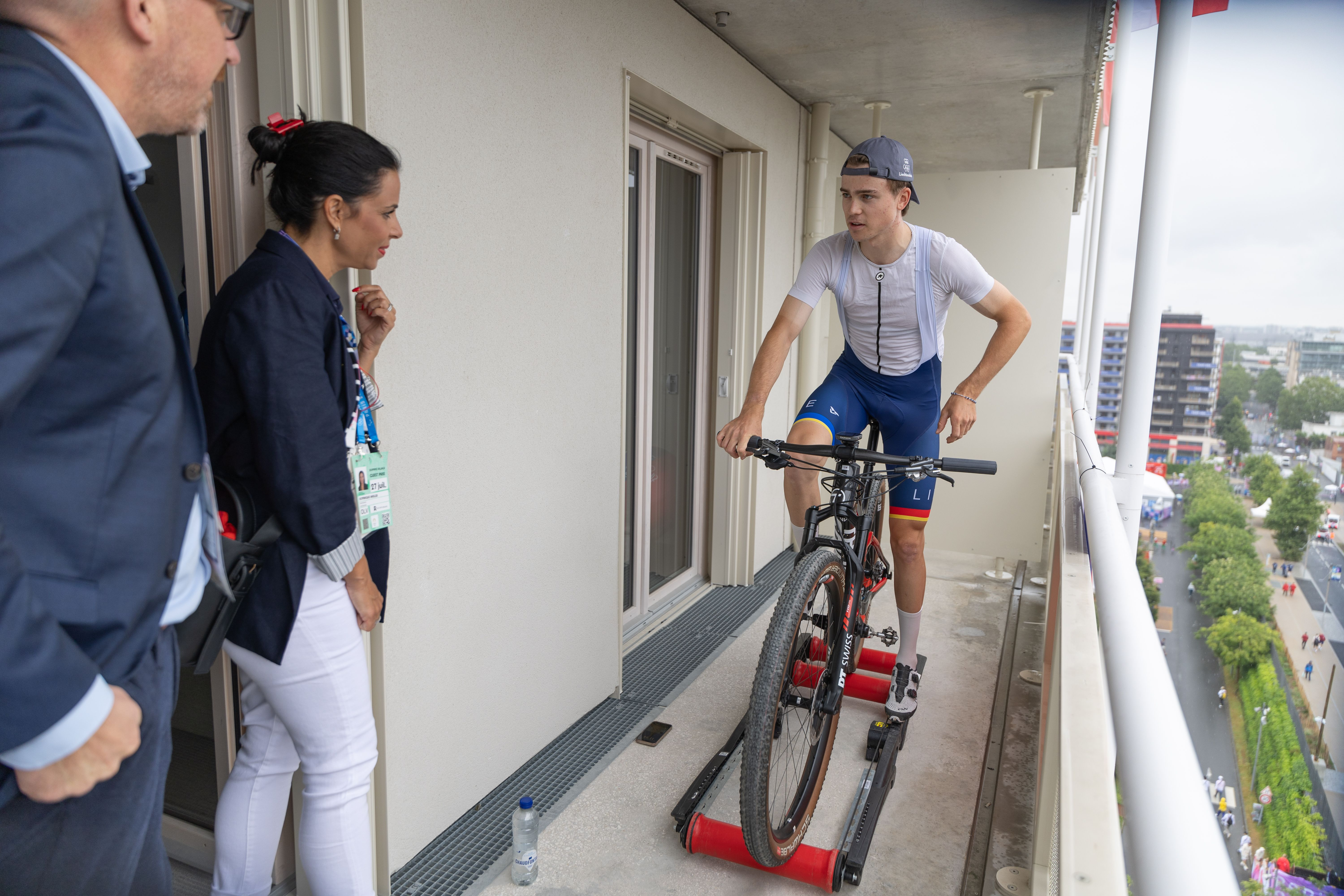
Püntener (right) training for his event

For the first time since the 1992 Summer Olympics in Barcelona, Spain, Liechtenstein competed in a cycling event. The nation received a universality slot from the Union Cycliste Internationale to send one male mountain biker for the Games, which allows a National Olympic Committee to send athletes despite not meeting the standard qualification criteria. The nation picked Romano Püntener, who would compete in the men's cross-country event.

Over a distance of 4.4 kilometres (2.7 mi) with eight laps, the men's cross-country event was held at Colline d'Élancourt and started at 2:10 p.m. on 29 July 2024. Püntener maintained an average speed of 22.337 kilometres per hour (13.880 mph) and finished with a time of 1:34:33. He placed 28th out of the 36 athletes that competed. The winner of the event was Tom Pidcock of Great Britain, who was the defending champion from the previous Summer Olympics in Tokyo. Pidcock won in a time of 1:26:22.

=== Mountain biking ===
Athlete	Event	Time	Rank
Romano Püntener	Men's cross-country	1:34:33	28
