= Rudolf Senti =

Liechtenstein sports shooter (1898–1958)

Personal information
- Born: 4 January 1898
- Died: 17 January 1958 (aged 60)

Sport
- Sport: Sports shooting

Rudolf Senti (4 January 1898 – 17 January 1958) was a Liechtenstein sports shooter. He competed in the 50 m rifle event at the 1936 Summer Olympics.
