= Liechtenstein at the 1952 Summer Olympics =

- IOC code: LIE
- NOC: Liechtenstein Olympic Committee

in Helsinki, Finland
- Competitors: 2 in 1 sport
- Medals: Gold 0 Silver 0 Bronze 0 Total 0

Summer Olympics appearances (overview)
- 1936; 1948; 1952; 1956; 1960; 1964; 1968; 1972; 1976; 1980; 1984; 1988; 1992; 1996; 2000; 2004; 2008; 2012; 2016; 2020; 2024

Liechtenstein competed at the 1952 Summer Olympics in Helsinki, Finland, which was held from 19 July to 3 August 1952. This marked the country's third appearance in a Summer Olympic Games, following their debut at the 1936 edition. Liechtenstein's delegation consisted of two male athletes, both cyclists who competed in the men's individual road race event: Ewald Hasler and Alois Lampert. Hasler finished in 43rd place, while Lampert finished in 30th place. As such, the nation failed to win a medal in these Games.

== Background ==
The formation of the Liechtenstein Olympic Committee began in 1934 at the behest of Baron Eduard von Falz-Fein, who had visited Lausanne and was asked by the President of the Swiss Olympic Association why Liechtenstein didn't have a committee. The Committee was officially founded in 1935 and recognised by the International Olympic Committee in the same year. Liechtenstein made their Olympics debut at the 1936 Winter Olympics in Garmisch-Partenkirchen, Germany, and their Summer Olympics debut a few months later in Berlin, Germany.

The 1952 Summer Games, which took place in Helsinki, Finland, from 19 July to 3 August 1952, hosted 4,955 athletes in 149 events from 69 different nations. The Liechtenstein delegation arrived in Helsinki on 17 July and consisted of two men, both athletes. Kurt Bandler served as the nation's attaché, whilst Prince Franz Joseph II and Princess Gina made the trip north to attend the Games.

== Cycling ==
Both of Liechtenstein's athletes competed in the men's individual road race cycling event, held on 2 August in Käpylä. Nineteen-year old Ewald Hasler finished with a time of 5 hours, 23 minutes, 34.8 seconds, good for 43rd place out of a field of 52 finishers. Alois Lampert, also 19 years old, finished in 5 hours, 20 minutes, 6 seconds, to finish in 30th place. The event was won by André Noyelle of Belgium, who finished in 5 hours, 6 minutes, and 3 seconds.

Men's Individual Road Race (190.4 km)

Athlete	Time	Rank
Ewald Hasler	5:23:34.8	43
Alois Lampert	5:20:06.6	30
