= Gustav Kaufmann =

Liechtenstein sports shooter (1918–2015)

Personal information
- Born: 23 August 1918 Schaan, Liechtenstein
- Died: 20 January 2015 (aged 96)

Sport
- Sport: Sports shooting

Gustav Kaufmann (23 August 1918 – 20 January 2015) was a professional sports shooter from Liechtenstein. He competed in the 50 metre rifle, three positions and 50 metre rifle, prone events at the 1960 Summer Olympics.
