= Rudolf Jehle =

Liechtenstein sports shooter (1894–1970)

Personal information
- Born: 20 February 1894
- Died: 18 December 1970 (aged 76)

Sport
- Sport: Sports shooting

Rudolf Jehle (20 February 1894 – 18 December 1970) was a Liechtenstein sports shooter. He competed in the 50 m rifle event at the 1936 Summer Olympics.
