= Gabriel Estaba =

Venezuelan basketball player (born 1965)

Personal information
- Born: March 24, 1965 (age 61) Carúpano, Venezuela
- Listed height: 6 ft 6 in (1.98 m)

Career information
- College: Jacksonville (1985–1988); South Alabama (1988-1989)
- NBA draft: 1988: undrafted
- Playing career: 1981–2004
- Position: Small forward

Career history
- 1981–1985: Panteras de Lara
- 1986-1989: Panteras de Miranda
- 1990: Marinos de Oriente
- 1990-1991: Académica de Coimbra
- 1991: Marinos de Oriente
- 1992: Bravos de Portuguesa
- 1992-1993: Askatuak
- 1993: Bravos de Portuguesa
- 1993-1994: Ganaderos de Hatillo
- 1994: Malteros de Lara
- 1995: Mauricio Báez
- 1996-1997: Gaiteros del Zulia
- 1997-1998: Cantabria Lobos
- 1998-2004: Gaiteros del Zulia

Gabriel Ramon Estaba García (born 24 March 1965 in Carúpano, Sucre) is a Venezuelan basketball player.

== Career ==
Estaba played Venezuela's Liga Profesional de Baloncesto with Panteras de Lara, Panteras de Miranda and Marinos de Oriente. He played with the Venezuela national basketball team at the 1990 FIBA World Championship (12th place) and 1992 Summer Olympics (11th place).
