= Günther Hasler =

Liechtenstein middle-distance runner

Personal information
- Full name: Günther Emil Hasler
- Nationality: Liechtenstein
- Born: 2 May 1951 (age 75) Nendeln, Eschen, Liechtenstein
- Height: 1.80 m (5 ft 11 in)
- Weight: 70 kg (154 lb)

Sport
- Sport: Middle-distance running
- Events: 800 metres, 1500 metres
- Club: TV Länggasse

Günther Emil Hasler (born 2 May 1951) is a retired Liechtenstein middle-distance runner. He competed in the men's 800 metres at the 1976 Summer Olympics. His biggest success was making the 800 metres final at the 1977 European Indoor Championships in San Sebastián where he finished fifth.

In addition, he was a three-time Swiss champion in 800 metres between 1975 and 1977, and, as of 2026, he still holds six outdoor and three indoor national records.

== International competitions ==
Year	Competition	Venue	Position	Event	Notes
Representing Liechtenstein
1973	Universiade	Moscow, Soviet Union	21st (sf)	800 m	1:52.1
1974	European Championships	Rome, Italy	25th (sf)	800 m	1:50.2
1974	European Championships	Rome, Italy	–	1500 m	DNF
1976	European Indoor Championships	Munich, West Germany	11th (h)	3000 m	8:28.4
1976	Olympic Games	Montreal, Canada	27th (h)	800 m	1:48.83
1976	Olympic Games	Montreal, Canada	12th (h)	1500 m	3:39.34
1977	European Indoor Championships	San Sebastián, Spain	5th	800 m	1:48.0
1977	Universiade	Sofia, Bulgaria	11th (sf)	800 m	1:48.2
1978	European Indoor Championships	Milan, Italy	12th (h)	800 m	1:56.3
1978	European Championships	Prague, Czechoslovakia	16th (sf)	800 m	1:49.3
1978	European Championships	Prague, Czechoslovakia	27th (h)	1500 m	3:46.7

== Personal bests ==
Outdoor

- 400 metres – 47.9h (Bern 1975) NR
- 800 metres – 1:46.16 (Zürich 1975) NR
- 1000 metres – 2:18.6h (Nice 1978) NR
- 1500 metres – 3:39.34 (Montreal 1976) NR
- 3000 metres – 8:10.63 (Zug 1976) NR

Indoor

- 800 metres – 1:47.41 (Milan 1977) NR
- 1500 metres – 3:50.8h (Böblingen 1977) NR
- 3000 metres – 8:25.87 (Magglingen 1978) NR
