= Alois Büchel =

Liechtenstein teacher and director (born 1941)

- Born: 16 April 1941 (age 85); Vaduz, Liechtenstein
- Spouse: Dodo Wohlwend (m. 1968)
- Children: 2
- Relatives: Thomas Büchel (brother)
- Sports career
- Sport: Athletics
- Event: Decathlon

Alois Büchel (born 16 April 1941) is a Liechtenstein former teacher, director, and athlete. He is best known for founding the Theaters am Kirchplatz (TaK) in Schaan.

== Life ==
He is from Balzers and attended secondary school in Vaduz before studying German, history, and philosophy in Bern and Bonn from 1963 to 1968, when he received a doctorate. He was a primary school teacher in Mörschwil and also a grammar school teacher in Vaduz. He represented Liechtenstein in the men's decathlon at the 1960 Summer Olympics and the 1964 Summer Olympics.

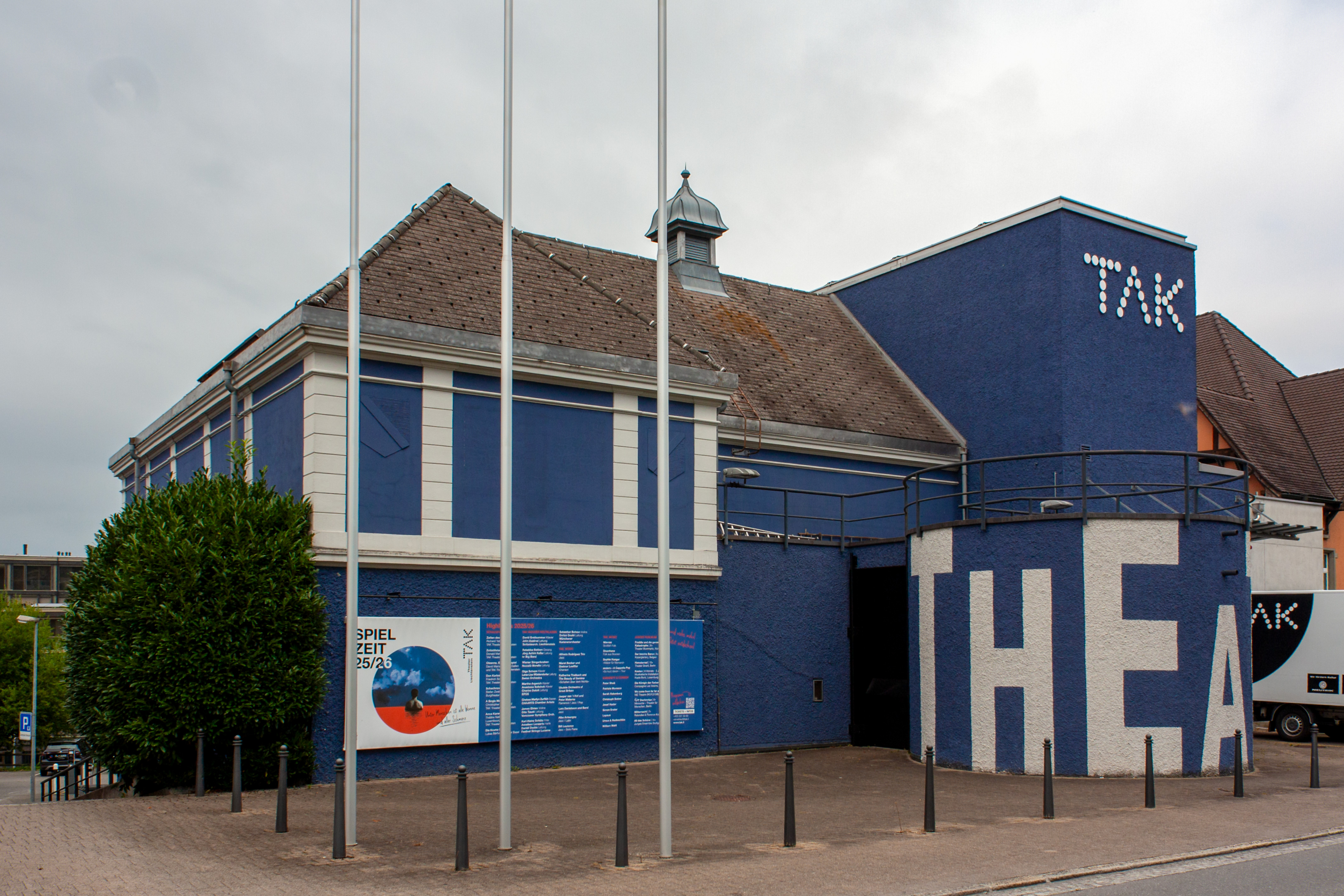
Theaters am Kirchplatz in Schaan, founded by Büchel.

Büchel was the co-founder, director and lyricist for the cabaret group Kaktus from 1964 to 1970. In 1970, he founded the Theaters am Kirchplatz (TaK) in Schaan, which he was the director until 1992. During this time, he staged numerous plays, including Waiting for Godot, and the theatre built a respectable reputation, including outside of Liechtenstein. He was dismissed as director in 1992 but won a lawsuit against it.

In 2018, Büchel published a book titled Unfassbar. In 2020, he won a case in the Liechtenstein state court regarding him being unlawfully placed into a psychiatric hospital in 2014 and was awarded 50,000 CHF.

Büchel married Dodo Wohlwend on 6 January 1968 and they have two children together. His brother Thomas Büchel served as the Deputy Prime Minister of Liechtenstein from 1993 to 1997.
