= Guido Wolf (sport shooter) =

Liechtenstein sports shooter (1924–1994)

Personal information
- Born: 12 June 1924 Vaduz, Liechtenstein
- Died: 13 October 1994 (aged 70)

Sport
- Sport: Sports shooting

Guido Wolf (12 June 1924 – 13 October 1994) was a Liechtenstein sports shooter. He competed in the 50 metre rifle, three positions and 50 metre rifle, prone events at the 1960 Summer Olympics.
