= Augustin Hilty =

Liechtenstein sports shooter (1896–1955)

Augustin Hilti
Personal information
- Born: 13 October 1896 Schaan, Liechtenstein
- Died: 16 July 1955 (aged 58)

Sport
- Sport: Sports shooting

Augustin Hilti (13 October 1896 – 16 July 1955) was a Liechtenstein sports shooter. He competed in the 50 m rifle event at the 1936 Summer Olympics.
