= Susanne Profanter =

Austrian judoka

Personal information
- Nationality: Austrian
- Born: 30 April 1970 (age 54); Kufstein, Austria
- Occupation: Judoka

Sport
- Sport: Judo

Profile at external databases
- IJF: 53817
- JudoInside.com: 3216

Susanne Profanter (born 30 April 1970) is an Austrian former judoka. She competed in the women's half-middleweight event at the 1992 Summer Olympics.
