= Xaver Frick Jr. =

Liechtenstein middle-distance runner (born 1946)

Personal information
- Nationality: Liechtenstein
- Born: 4 March 1946 (age 80) Vaduz, Liechtenstein
- Height: 176 cm (5 ft 9 in)
- Weight: 64 kg (141 lb; 10 st 1 lb)

Sport
- Sport: Middle-distance running
- Events: 800 metres 1500 metres
- Team: LC Vaduz

Achievements and titles
- Personal bests: 800 m run: 1:52.68 (1968); 1500 m run: 3:51.8 (1968)

Xaver Frick Jr. (born 4 March 1946) is a former Liechtenstein middle-distance runner.

== Biography ==
Frick was born on 4 March 1946, in Vaduz, Liechtenstein.

Frick competed in both the men's 800 m and men's 1500 m events at the 1968 Summer Olympics. In the 800 metres, which took place on 13 October, he was placed in heat six for the heats round and completed his race in a time of 1:52.6, finishing in seventh place. He failed to advance to the semifinals. In the 1500 metres, which took place on 18 October, he was placed in heat three for the heats round and completed his race in a time of 4:15.3, finishing in ninth place. He failed to advance to the semifinals.
