= Zhang Di =

Chinese judoka

Personal information
- Born: 4 July 1968 (age 58)
- Occupation: Judoka

Sport
- Country: China
- Sport: Judo
- Weight class: ‍–‍61 kg, ‍–‍66 kg, +72 kg

Achievements and titles
- Olympic Games: (bronze) (1992)
- World Champ.: (silver) (1991)
- Asian Champ.: (gold) (1990)
Medal record
Women's judo
Representing China
Olympic Games
Bronze medal – third place	1992 Barcelona	‍–‍61 kg
World Championships
Silver medal – second place	1991 Barcelona	+72 kg
Bronze medal – third place	1993 Hamilton	‍–‍66 kg
Asian Games
Gold medal – first place	1990 Beijing	‍–‍66 kg
Bronze medal – third place	1994 Hiroshima	‍–‍61 kg
Asian Championships
Bronze medal – third place	1988 Damascus	‍–‍61 kg
East Asian Games
Gold medal – first place	1993 Shanghai	‍–‍61 kg

Profile at external databases
- IJF: 53823
- JudoInside.com: 6587
- Updated on 5 June 2023

Zhang Di (Chinese: 张迪) is a female Chinese Judoka. She competed at the 1992 Barcelona Olympic Games and won a bronze medal in Women's ‍–‍61 kg.
