= Catherine Fleury-Vachon =

French judoka (born 1966)

Personal information
- Born: 18 June 1966 (age 60)
- Occupation: Judoka

Sport
- Country: France
- Sport: Judo
- Weight class: –61 kg

Achievements and titles
- Olympic Games: (gold) (1992)
- World Champ.: (1989)
- European Champ.: (gold) (1989)
Medal record
Women's judo
Representing France
Olympic Games
Gold medal – first place	1992 Barcelona	‍–‍61 kg
World Championships
Gold medal – first place	1989 Belgrade	‍–‍61 kg
Bronze medal – third place	1991 Barcelona	‍–‍61 kg
Bronze medal – third place	1995 Chiba	‍–‍61 kg
European Championships
Gold medal – first place	1989 Helsinki	‍–‍61 kg
Silver medal – second place	1996 The Hague	‍–‍61 kg
Bronze medal – third place	1993 Athens	‍–‍61 kg
Bronze medal – third place	1995 Birmingham	‍–‍61 kg

Profile at external databases
- IJF: 713
- JudoInside.com: 2480
- Updated on 5 June 2023

Catherine Fleury (born 18 June 1966 in Paris) is a French judoka, world and Olympic champion. She won the gold medal in the half middleweight division at the 1992 Summer Olympics in Barcelona.

She won a gold medal at the 1989 World Judo Championships and bronze medals at the 1991 and at the 1995 World Judo Championships.

She was the first French woman in history winning the gold medal at the Olympics.
