= Peter Hermann (cyclist) =

Liechtenstein cyclist (born 1963)

Personal information
- Born: 16 October 1963 (age 62) Schaan, Liechtenstein

Cycling career
- Sport: Cycling

Peter Hermann (born 16 October 1963) is a retired male track cyclist from Liechtenstein, who competed for his native country in three events at the 1988 Summer Olympics in Seoul, South Korea. His best result was finishing in 21st place in the Men's 1,000 metres Time Trial. He is the brother of Roman Hermann and Sigmund Hermann.
