= Hugo Walser =

Liechtenstein middle-distance runner

Personal information
- Nationality: Liechtenstein
- Born: 1 June 1940
- Died: 12 July 2005 (aged 65)

Sport
- Sport: Middle-distance running
- Event: 800 metres

Hugo Walser (1 June 1940 – 12 July 2005) was a Liechtenstein middle-distance runner. He competed in the men's 800 metres and 1500 metres at the 1964 Summer Olympics.

== Personal bests ==
- 800 metres: 1:55.9 (1962)
- 1500 metres: 3:53.3 (1964)
