= Zsuzsa Nagy (judoka) =

Hungarian judoka

Personal information
- Nationality: Hungarian
- Born: 3 November 1975 (age 50) Budapest, Hungary

Sport
- Sport: Judo

Zsuzsa Nagy (born 3 November 1975) is a Hungarian judoka. She competed in the women's half-middleweight event at the 1992 Summer Olympics.
