= Miroslava Jánošíková =

Czechoslovak judoka

Personal information
- National team: Slovakia
- Born: 28 April 1969 (age 56); Bratislava, Czechoslovakia

Sport
- Sport: Judo

Miroslava Jánošíková (born 28 April 1969) is a former Czechoslovak Olympic judoka.

She was born in Bratislava, Slovakia.

== Judo career ==
Her sports club was Rapid, Sokol Bratislava.

Jánošíková won the Czechoslovakia Judo Championship in the U56 weight class in 1989–91, and in the U61 weight class in 1992. She won the Slovak Judo Championship in the U61 weight class 1993-94 and 1996–97, and in the U63 weight class in 1998 and 2002.

Jánošíková competed for Czechoslovakia at the 1992 Summer Olympics in Barcelona at the age of 23 in Judo--Women's Half-Middleweight, and came in tied for 9th.

She won a bronze medal at the 1994 European Judo Championships in Gdańsk in the U61 weight class.
