= Remo Sele =

Liechtenstein sports shooter (born 1948)

Personal information
- Born: Raimond Sele; 7 June 1948 (age 78)

Sport
- Sport: Sports shooting

Remo Sele (born 7 June 1948) is a Liechtenstein former sports shooter. He competed at the 1972 Summer Olympics and the 1984 Summer Olympics.
