= Ileana Beltrán =

Cuban judoka (born 1971)

Personal information
- Born: May 24, 1971 (age 55) Havana, Cuba
Medal record
Women's judo
Representing Cuba
World Championships
| Bronze medal – third place | 1993 Hamilton | Half-Middleweight |
Pan American Games
| Gold medal – first place | 1991 Havana | Half-Middleweight |
| Gold medal – first place | 1995 Mar del Plata | Half-Middleweight |

Ileana Benita Beltrán Zulueta (born May 24, 1971, in Havana, Ciudad de la Habana) is a retired female judoka from Cuba. She twice competed for her native country at the Summer Olympics in the Women's Half-Middleweight (– 61 kg) division: 1992 and 1996. Beltrán twice won a gold medal at the Pan American Games during her career.
