= Xiomara Griffith =

Venezuelan judoka (born 1969)

Personal information
- Born: September 13, 1969 (age 56)
Medal record
Women's judo
Representing Venezuela
Pan American Games
Silver medal – second place	1999 Winnipeg	Middleweight
Bronze medal – third place	1991 Havana	Half-Middleweight
Bronze medal – third place	1995 Mar del Plata	Half-Middleweight

Xiomara Yolanda Griffith Mahon (born September 13, 1969) is a female judoka from Venezuela. She competed for her native South American country at three consecutive Summer Olympics, starting in 1992. Griffith won a total of three medals at the Pan American Games in the 1990s.
