= Patrick Matt =

Liechtenstein cyclist (born 1969)

Personal information
- Born: 4 April 1969 (age 57)

Cycling career
- Sport: Cycling

Patrick Matt (born 4 April 1969) is a retired male track cyclist from Liechtenstein, who competed for his native country in two events at the 1988 Summer Olympics in Seoul, South Korea. His best result at the games was finishing in 18th place in the Men's Individual Pursuit (4,000 metres). Matt also competed at the 1992 Summer Olympics in Barcelona, Spain.
