= Yvonne Elkuch =

Liechtenstein cyclist (born 1968)

Personal information
- Born: 31 March 1968 (age 58) Altstätten, Sankt Gallen, Switzerland

Cycling career
- Sport: Cycling

Yvonne Elkuch (born 31 March 1968) is Liechtensteiner cyclist who came 47th in the road race at the 1992 Summer Olympics in Barcelona, Spain. She also competed at the 1988 Summer Olympics in Seoul, South Korea, 17th place, where she carried the flag for Liechtenstein at the opening ceremony.
