= Birgit Blum =

Liechtenstein judoka (born 1968)

Personal information
- Nationality: Liechtenstein
- Born: 7 January 1968 (age 57)
- Occupation: Judoka

Sport
- Sport: Judo

Profile at external databases
- JudoInside.com: 3065

Birgit Blum (born 7 January 1968) is a Liechtenstein judoka. She competed at the 1992 Summer Olympics and the 1996 Summer Olympics.
