= Marcel Tschopp =

Liechtensteiner orienteer and track athlete

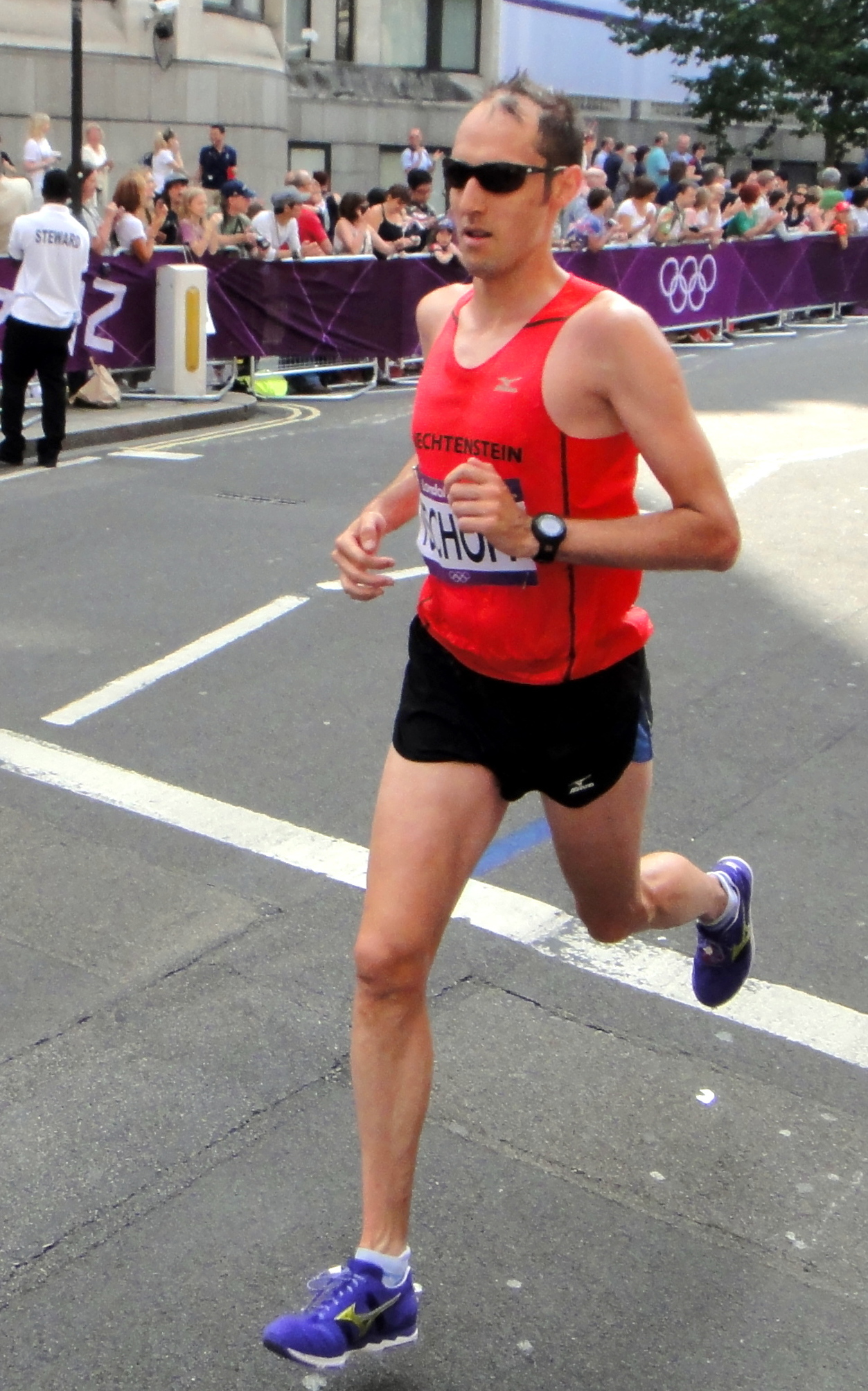
- Marcel Tschopp in the marathon at the 2012 Olympics in London

Personal information
- Born: 28 April 1974 (age 52) Ruggell, Liechtenstein
- Height: 1.81 m (5 ft 11 1/2 in)
- Weight: 66 kg (146 lb)

Sport
- Country: Liechtenstein
- Sport: Athletics; Orienteering
- Event: Marathon

Marcel Tschopp (born 28 April 1974 in Ruggell) is a Liechtensteiner orienteer and track athlete, specializing in the marathon. Tschopp was Liechtenstein's flag bearer for the opening ceremony of the 2008 Summer Olympics in Beijing, and finished 74th in the men's marathon. He finished 75th in the same event at the 2012 Summer Olympics.

Tschopp is a physician by profession.

== Achievements ==
=== Athletics ===
Year	Competition	Venue	Position	Event	Notes
2004	World Half Marathon Championships	New Delhi, India	75th	Half marathon	1:16:45
2005	World Half Marathon Championships	Edmonton, Canada	72nd	Half marathon	1:13:57
2007	Games of the Small States of Europe	Fontvieille, Monaco	5th	5000 m	15:41.58
2007	Games of the Small States of Europe	Fontvieille, Monaco	6th	10,000 m	32:32.81
2007	World Championships	Osaka, Japan	47th	Marathon	2:33:42
2008	Olympic Games	Beijing, China	74th	Marathon	2:35:06
2009	World Half Marathon Championships	Birmingham, United Kingdom	88th	Half marathon	1:10:28
2010	European Championships	Barcelona, Spain	39th	Marathon	2:37:14
2011	Games of the Small States of Europe	Schaan, Liechtenstein	5th	5000 m	15:48.15
2011	Games of the Small States of Europe	Schaan, Liechtenstein	4th	10,000 m	32:44.74
2012	Olympic Games	London, United Kingdom	75th	Marathon	2:28:54
2016	European Championships	Amsterdam, Netherlands	83rd	Half marathon	1:15:36

=== Orienteering ===
Year	Competition	Venue	Position	Event	Notes
2003	World Orienteering Championships	Rapperswil/Jona, Switzerland	28th	Sprint	14:27.9
2003	World Orienteering Championships	Rapperswil/Jona, Switzerland	20th	Middle Qualifier	26:46
2012	World Orienteering Championships	Lausanne, Switzerland	28th	Sprint Qualifier	15:17
2012	World Orienteering Championships	Lausanne, Switzerland	23rd	Long Qualifier	75:08
