= Oliver Geissmann =

Liechtenstein sports shooter (born 1978)

Personal information
- Born: 9 December 1978 (age 47)
Medal record
Men's shooting
Representing Liechtenstein
Games of the Small States of Europe
| Gold medal – first place | 2005 Andorra | 10 m air rifle |

Oliver Geissmann (born 9 December 1978 in Grabs, Switzerland) is a Liechtensteiner sport shooter, specializing in the 10 metre air rifle. Geissmann has represented his country at the Summer Olympics in 2000, 2004 and 2008. He finished in the 41st, 22nd and 34th positions respectively in the three Olympic Games. Geissmann was Liechtenstein's only Olympic representative in 2004, and one of two in 2008.

Olympic results
| Event | 2000 | 2004 | 2008 |
|---|---|---|---|
| 10 metre air rifle | 41st 582 | 22nd 591 | 34th 588 |
