= Markus Büchel (athlete) =

Liechtenstein sprinter (born 1961)

Personal information
- Nationality: Liechtenstein
- Born: 25 April 1961 (age 64)

Sport
- Sport: Sprinting
- Event: 100 metres

Markus Büchel (German pronunciation: [ˈmaʁkʊs ˈbyːçl̩]; born 25 April 1961) is a Liechtenstein sprinter. He competed in the 100 metres at the 1984 Summer Olympics and the 1988 Summer Olympics.
