= Italy at the FIS Alpine World Ski Championships =

- IOC code: ITA
- National federation: FISI
- Website: www.fisi.org
- Medals Ranked 7th: Gold 24 Silver 26 Bronze 27 Total 77

FIS Alpine World Ski Championships appearances (overview)
- 1931; 1932; 1933; 1934; 1935; 1936; 1937; 1938; 1939; 1948; 1950; 1952; 1954; 1956; 1958; 1960; 1962; 1964; 1966; 1968; 1970; 1972; 1974; 1976; 1978; 1980; 1982; 1985; 1987; 1989; 1991; 1993; 1996; 1997; 1999; 2001; 2003; 2005; 2007; 2009; 2011; 2013; 2015; 2017; 2019; 2021

Italy has participated in all editions of the FIS Alpine World Ski Championships, held since the first edition of FIS Alpine World Ski Championships 1931, winning 73 podiums, including 22 world titles, 25 silver medals and 26 bronze medals.

== History ==
The Italian team participated for the first time in the Alpine World Ski Championships already starting from the first edition, however with a single athlete, Carlo Barassi, who finished 20th in slalom, 25th in downhill and 16th in combined. The first medal of ever was a gold medal won by a women, Paula Wiesinger in Cortina 1932.

Following the WWII, the championships were connected with the Olympics for several decades. From 1948 through 1982, the competition was held in even-numbered years, with the Winter Olympics acting as the World Championships through 1980, and a separate competition held in even-numbered non-Olympic years.

== Medal count ==
The edition coincided with the Winter Olympics
Edition with no medals won
Italy won the Medal table

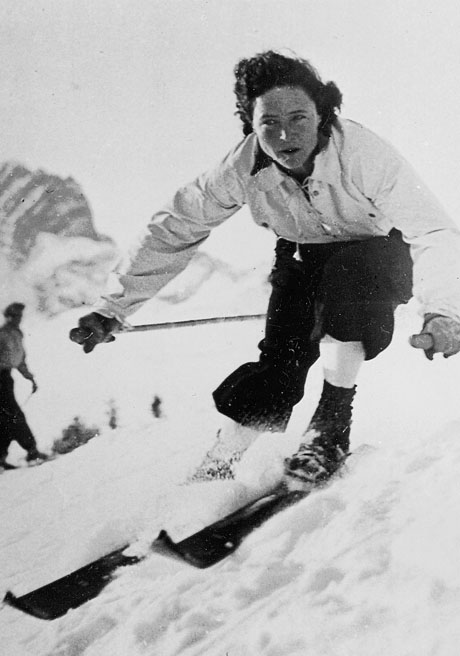
Paula Wiesinger, first medal of ever for the Italy national alpine ski team won in downhill in Cortina 1932.

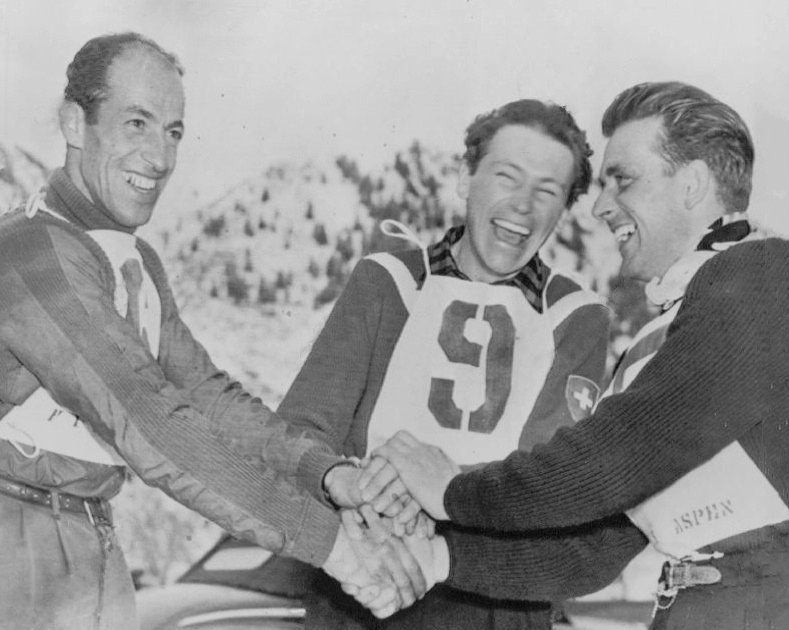
Zeno Colò, first from left, with Fernand Grosjean and James Couttet after his gold medal the giant slalom in Aspen 1950.

Edition	Competitors			Men			Women			Total				
Edition	Tot.	M	W	1st place, gold medalist(s)	2nd place, silver medalist(s)	3rd place, bronze medalist(s)	1st place, gold medalist(s)	2nd place, silver medalist(s)	3rd place, bronze medalist(s)	1st place, gold medalist(s)	2nd place, silver medalist(s)	3rd place, bronze medalist(s)	Tot.	Rank
(Switzerland) Mürren 1931	1	0	0	0	0	0	0	0	0	0	0	0	0	-
(Italy) Cortina 1932	11	6	5	0	0	0	1	0	0	1	0	0	1	3
(Austria) Innsbruck 1933	11	7	4	0	0	0	0	0	0	0	0	0	0	-
(Switzerland) St. Moritz 1934	11	6	5	0	0	1	0	0	0	0	0	1	1	3
(Switzerland) Mürren 1935	did not participate			0	0	0	0	0	0	0	0	0	0	-
(Austria) Innsbruck 1936	8	5	4	0	1	0	0	0	0	0	1	0	1	4
(France) Chamonix 1937	3	3	0	0	1	0	0	0	0	0	1	0	1	4
(Switzerland) Engelberg 1938	5	5	0	0	0	0	0	0	0	0	0	0	0	-
(Poland) Zakopane 1939	4	4	0	0	0	0	0	0	0	0	0	0	0	-
(Switzerland) St. Moritz 1948	8	6	2	0	0	0	0	0	0	0	0	0	0	-
(United States) Aspen 1950	5	4	1	2	1	0	0	0	1	2	1	1	4	2
(Norway) Oslo 1952	8	5	3	1	0	0	0	0	1	1	0	1	2	4
(Sweden) Åre 1954	8	5	3	0	0	0	0	0	0	0	0	0	0	-
(Italy) Cortina 1956	13	7	6	0	0	0	0	0	1	0	0	1	1	7
(Austria) Badgastein 1958	10	5	5	0	0	0	0	0	1	0	0	1	1	7
(United States) Squaw Valley 1960	10	5	5	0	0	0	0	0	1	0	0	1	1	7
(France) Chamonix 1962	10	7	3	0	0	0	0	1	0	0	1	0	1	3
(Austria) Innsbruck 1964	11	6	5	0	0	0	0	0	0	0	0	0	0	-
(Chile) Portillo 1966	9	7	2	1	0	0	0	0	0	1	0	0	1	2
(France) Grenoble 1968	10	6	4	0	0	0	0	0	0	0	0	0	0	-
(Italy) Val Gardena 1970	13	8	5	0	0	0	0	0	0	0	0	0	0	-
(Japan) Sapporo 1972	8	8	0	2	1	1	0	0	0	2	1	1	4	2
(Switzerland) St. Moritz 1974	14	8	6	2	0	1	0	0	0	2	0	1	3	3
(Austria) Innsbruck 1976	12	7	5	1	1	1	0	1	0	2	2	1	5	2
(Germany) Garmisch 1978	15	8	7	0	1	0	0	0	0	0	1	0	1	6
(United States) Lake Placid 1980	14	8	6	0	0	0	0	0	0	0	0	0	0	-
(Austria) Schladming 1982	18	12	6	0	0	0	0	0	1	0	0	1	1	8
(Italy) Bormio 1985	17	10	7	0	0	0	0	0	1	0	0	1	1	8
(Switzerland) Crans-Montana 1987				0	0	1	0	0	0	0	0	1	1	6
(United States) Vail 1989				0	0	0	0	0	0	0	0	0	0	-
(Austria) Saalbach 1991				0	2	0	0	0	0	0	2	0	2	6
(Japan) Morioka 1993				0	0	0	0	0	0	0	0	0	0	-
(Spain) Sierra Nevada 1996				2	1	0	2	0	0	4	1	0	5	1
(Italy) Sestriere 1997				0	0	2	3	1	0	3	1	2	6	2
(United States) Vail 1999				0	0	0	0	0	0	0	0	0	0	-
(Austria) St. Anton 2001				0	0	0	0	2	1	0	2	1	3	8
(Switzerland) St. Moritz 2003				0	0	1	0	1	0	0	1	1	2	8
(Italy) Bormio 2005		10		0	0	2	0	2	0	0	2	2	2	4
(Sweden) Åre 2007	22	11	11	1	1	0	0	0	1	1	1	1	3	5
(France) Val d'Isère 2009	23	12	11	0	1	0	0	0	1	0	1	1	2	8
(Germany) Garmisch 2011	24	13	11	1	1	3	0	3	0	1	2	3	6	3
(Austria) Schladming 2013	22	13	9	0	1	1	0	1	0	0	2	1	3	7
(United States) Vail/Beaver Creek 2015	22	12	10	0	0	0	0	0	0	0	0	0	0	-
(Switzerland) St. Moritz 2017	24	13	11	0	0	0	0	0	1	0	0	1	1	11
(Sweden) Åre 2019	20	11	9	1	0	0	0	1	1	1	1	1	3	5
(Italy) Cortina 2021	23	13	10	0	1	0	1	0	0	1	1	0	2	6
										22	25	26	73	7

== Skiers appearances ==
Participated

=== Men 1931-1970 ===
Skier	31	32	33	34	35	36	37	38	39	48	50	52	54	56	58	60	62	64	66	68	70	Tot.	Notes
Carlo Barassi																						1	
Renato Valle																						2	
Sisto Gillarduzzi																						1	
Ferdinando Valle																						1	
Roberto Zardini																						1	
Francesco Kostner																						1	
Dario Demenego																						2	
Andrea Lacedelli																						1	
Ido Cattaneo																						2	
Enrico Lacedelli																						3	
Severino Menardi																						2	
Renato Dimai																						3	
Ettore Nani																						2	
Guglielmo Holzner																						2	
Giacinto Sertorelli																						2	
Rolando Zanni																						3	
Federico Pariani																						1	
Vittorio Chierroni																						5	
Cesare Chiogna																						1	
Giovanni Paluselli																						2	
Giovanni Nogler																						2	
Roberto Lacedelli																						4	
Alberto Marcellin																						1	
Silvio Alverà																						2	
Carlo Gartner																						4	
Eugenio Bonicco																						1	
Zeno Colò																						3	
Albino Alverà																						2	
Ilio Colli																						1	
Otto Glueck																						1	
Lino Zecchini																						2	
Gino Burrini																						3	
Paride Milianti																						6	
Guido Ghedina																						1	
Dino Pompanin																						1	
Bruno Burrini																						2	
Italo Pedroncelli																						3	
Bruno Alberti																						4	
Roberto Siorpaes																						1	
Carlo Senoner																						4	
Felice De Nicolò																						5	
Helmuth Gartner																						1	
Martino Fill																						2	
Ivo Mahlknecht																						4	
Gerhard Mussner																						2	
Giovanni Dibona																						1	
Giuseppe Compagnoni																						2	
Claudio De Tassis																						1	
Teresio Vachet																						1	
Renato Valentini																						1	
Bruno Piazzalunga																						1	
Gustav Thöni																						1	
Pier Lorenzo Clataud																						1	
Eberhard Schmalzl																						1	
Helmuth Schmalzl																						1	
Stefano Anzi																						1	
Marcello Varallo																						1	
	1	6	7	6	0	5	4	5	4	6	4	5	5	7	5	5	7	6	7	6	8		

=== Men 1972-2021 ===
Representing Moldova

Skier	72	74	76	78	80	82	85	87	89	91	93	96	97	99	01	03	05	07	09	11	13	15	17	19	21	Tot.	Notes
Gustav Thöni																										5	
Stefano Anzi																										2	
Giuliano Besson																										2	
Marcello Varallo																										2	
Roland Thöni																										2	
Helmuth Schmalzl																										2	
Eberhard Schmalzl																										1	
Erwin Stricker																										3	
Fausto Radici																										3	
Piero Gros																										5	
Herbert Plank																										3	
Franco Bieler																										1	
Renato Antonioli																										1	
Giuliano Giardini																										3	
Mauro Bernardi																										2	
Bruno Nöckler																										3	
Alex Giorgi																										3	
Paolo De Chiesa																										3	
Riccardo Foppa																										1	
Giuseppe Carletti																										1	
Peter Mally																										1	
Marco Tonazzi																										1	
Michael Mair																										2	
Oskar Delago																										1	
Mauro Cornaz																										2	
Danilo Sbardellotto																										3	
Ivano Edalini																										2	
Oswald Tötsch																										2	
Robert Erlacher																										2	
Richard Pramotton																										2	
Giacomo Erlacher																										1	
Alberto Tomba																										6	
Giorgio Piantanida																										1	
Josef Polig																										1	
Kristian Ghedina																										8	
Peter Runggaldier																										5	
Pietro Vitalini																										4	
Werner Perathoner																										3	
Matteo Belfrond																										1	
Alberto Senigagliesi																										1	
Patrick Holzer																										4	
Fabrizio Tescari																										3	
Konrad Kurt Ladstätter																										2	
Fabio De Crignis																										2	
Gerhard Königsrainer																										2	
Alessandro Fattori																										4	
Luca Cattaneo																										2	
Ivan Bormolini																										3	
Matteo Nana																										2	
Erik Seletto																										3	
Giorgio Rocca																										6	
Angelo Weiss																										1	
Sergio Bergamelli																										1	
Davide Simoncelli																										7	
Max Blardone																										7	
Peter Fill																										7	
Giancarlo Bergamelli																										2	
Alberto Schieppati																										2	
Giancarlo Bergamelli																										2	
Arnold Rieder																										1	
Mirko Deflorian																										3	
Cristian Deville																										3	
Kurt Sulzenbacher																										2	
Patrick Staudacher																										2	
Manfred Mölgg																										8	
Christof Innerhofer																										7	
Patrick Thaler																										5	
Werner Heel																										5	
Giuliano Razzoli																										7	
Alexander Ploner																										1	
Stefan Thanei																										1	
Stefano Gross																										6	
Matteo Marsaglia																										6	
Dominik Paris																										6	
Giovanni Borsotti																										3	
Paolo Pangrazzi																										1	
Roberto Nani																										2	
Siegmar Klotz																										1	
Florian Eisath																										2	
Simon Maurberger																										2	
Mattia Casse																										2	
Riccardo Tonetti																										3	
Emanuele Buzzi																										2	
Luca De Aliprandini																										2	
Alex Vinatzer																										2	
Giovanni Franzoni																										1	
Florian Schieder																										1	
	8	8	7	8	8	12	10										10	11	12	13	13	12	13	11	13		

=== Women 1931-1970 ===
Skier	31	32	33	34	35	36	37	38	39	48	50	52	54	56	58	60	62	64	66	68	70	Tot.	Notes
Paula Wiesinger																						4	
Elena Schott																						3	
Isalina Crivelli																						2	
Livia Bertolini																						2	
Velo Delly																						1	
Ofelia Zardini																						1	
Oda Gadda																						1	
Lina Gadda																						1	
Clara Frida																						1	
Nives Dei Rossi																						1	
Celina Seghi																						4	
Renata Carraretto																						1	
Giuliana Minuzzo																						3	
Maria Grazia Marchelli																						3	
Anna Pellissier																						2	
Vera Schenone																						2	
Cristina Ebner																						1	
Carla Marchelli																						3	
Jole Poloni																						1	
Jerta Schir																						3	
Pia Riva																						4	
Jole Schir																						1	
Inge Senoner																						2	
Lidia Barbieri Sacconaghi																						1	
Giustina Demetz																						3	
Patrizia Medail																						1	
Glorianda Cipolla																						2	
Clotilde Fasolis																						2	
Lotte Nogler																						1	
Eva Pitscheider																						1	
Lidia Pellissier																						1	
Maria Roberta Schranz																						1	
Roselda Joux																						1	
	0	5	4	5	0	3	0	0	0	2	1	3	3	6	5	5	3	5	2	4	5		

=== Women 1972-2021 ===
Skier	72	74	76	78	80	82	85	87	89	91	93	96	97	99	01	03	05	07	09	11	13	15	17	19	21	Tot.
Nicole Gius																										7
Karen Putzer																										6
Denise Karbon																										6
Lucia Recchia																										5
Manuela Mölgg																										7
Chiara Costazza																										6
Nadia Fanchini																										6
Elena Fanchini																										6
Johanna Schnarf																										5
Daniela Merighetti																										5
Annalisa Ceresa																										1
Irene Curtoni																										6
Verena Stuffer																										3
Wendy Siorpaes																										1
Federica Brignone																										5
Elena Curtoni																										5
Francesca Marsaglia																										5
Sofia Goggia																										3
Marta Bassino																										4
Lara Della Mea																										2
Nicol Delago																										1
Nadia Delago																										1
Anita Gulli																										1
Martina Peterlini																										1
Laura Pirovano																										1
																		11	11	11	9	10	11	9	10	

== See also ==
- Italy national alpine ski team
- Italian Winter Sports Federation
