= Italy at the FIS Alpine World Ski Championships 1978 =

Italy at the 1978 FIS Alpine World Ski Championships
- IOC code: ITA
- National federation: FISI
- Website: www.fisi.org

in (Germany) Garmisch-Partenkirchen
- Competitors: 15 (8 men, 7 women)
- Medals Ranked 6th: Gold 0 Silver 1 Bronze 1 Total 2

FIS Alpine World Ski Championships appearances (overview)
- 1931; 1932; 1933; 1934; 1935; 1936; 1937; 1938; 1939; 1948; 1950; 1952; 1954; 1956; 1958; 1960; 1962; 1964; 1966; 1968; 1970; 1972; 1974; 1976; 1978; 1980; 1982; 1985; 1987; 1989; 1991; 1993; 1996; 1997; 1999; 2001; 2003; 2005; 2007; 2009; 2011; 2013; 2015; 2017; 2019; 2021

Italy competed at the FIS Alpine World Ski Championships 1978 in Garmisch-Partenkirchen, Germany, from 29 January to 5 February 1978.

== Medalists ==
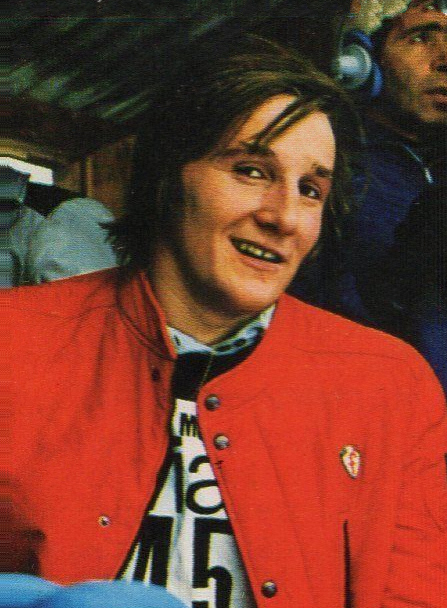
Pierino Gros silver medal won at this edition of the world championships.

Athlete	Gendre	Event	Medal
Pierino Gros	Men	Slalom	SILVER

== Results ==
=== Men ===
Skier	Slalom	Giant slalom	Downhill	Combined
Pierino Gros	2	13		
Gustav Thöni	DNF1	24	12	DNF
Mauro Bernardi	5	11		
Fausto Radici	DNF1			
Bruno Noeckler		10		
Herbert Plank			10	
Renato Antonioli			20	
Giulio Giardini			21	

=== Women ===
Skier	Slalom	Giant slalom	Downhill	Combined
Claudia Giordani	8	16		
Daniela Zini	11	34		
Wilma Gatta	24			
Wanda Bieler	DNF1	27		
Ninna Quario		41		
Cristina Gravina			16	
Jolanda Plank			22	

== See also ==
- Italy at the FIS Alpine World Ski Championships
- Italy national alpine ski team
