= Italy at the FIS Alpine World Ski Championships 1980 =

Italy at the 1980 FIS Alpine World Ski Championships
- IOC code: ITA
- National federation: FISI
- Website: www.fisi.org

in (United States) Lake Placid
- Competitors: 14 (8 men, 6 Women)
- Medals Ranked -th: Gold 0 Silver 0 Bronze 0 Total 0

FIS Alpine World Ski Championships appearances (overview)
- 1931; 1932; 1933; 1934; 1935; 1936; 1937; 1938; 1939; 1948; 1950; 1952; 1954; 1956; 1958; 1960; 1962; 1964; 1966; 1968; 1970; 1972; 1974; 1976; 1978; 1980; 1982; 1985; 1987; 1989; 1991; 1993; 1996; 1997; 1999; 2001; 2003; 2005; 2007; 2009; 2011; 2013; 2015; 2017; 2019; 2021

Italy competed at the FIS Alpine World Ski Championships 1980 in Lake Placid, United States, from 14 to 23 February 1980.

From 1948 through 1980, the alpine skiing events at the Winter Olympics also served as the World Championships, held every two years. With the addition of the giant slalom, the combined event was dropped for 1950 and 1952, but returned as a World Championship event in 1954 as a "paper race" which used the results from the three events. During the Olympics from 1956 through 1980, World Championship medals were awarded by the FIS for the combined event. The combined returned as a separate event at the World Championships in 1982 and at the Olympics in 1988.

== Medalists ==
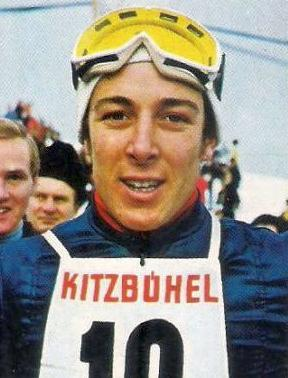
Gustav Thöni 8th in slalom at this edition of the world championships.

At this third edition of the world championships, Italy won no medal.

== Results ==
=== Men ===
Skier	Slalom	Giant slalom	Downhill	Combined
Gustav Thöni	8			
Mauro Bernardi	DNF2	DNF1		
Bruno Nöckler	DNF1	6		
Paolo De Chiesa	DNF1	8		
Pierino Gros		DNF2		
Alex Giorgi		DNF2		
Herbert Plank			6	
Giuliano Giardini			11	

=== Women ===
In the combined ranking, being a paper race, the two Italian skiers who had taken part in all three competitions were classified.

Skier	Slalom	Giant slalom	Downhill	Combined
Claudia Giordani	5	10		
Ninna Quario	4	DNF2		
Daniela Zini	7	DNF1		
Wilma Gatta	10			
Wanda Bieler		DNF1		
Cristina Gravina			15	

== See also ==
- Italy at the 1980 Winter Olympics
- Italy at the FIS Alpine World Ski Championships
- Italy national alpine ski team
