= Italy at the FIS Alpine World Ski Championships 1982 =

Italy at the 1982 FIS Alpine World Ski Championships
- IOC code: ITA
- National federation: FISI
- Website: www.fisi.org

in (Austria) Schladming
- Competitors: 18 (12 men, 6 women)
- Medals Ranked 8th: Gold 0 Silver 0 Bronze 1 Total 1

FIS Alpine World Ski Championships appearances (overview)
- 1931; 1932; 1933; 1934; 1935; 1936; 1937; 1938; 1939; 1948; 1950; 1952; 1954; 1956; 1958; 1960; 1962; 1964; 1966; 1968; 1970; 1972; 1974; 1976; 1978; 1980; 1982; 1985; 1987; 1989; 1991; 1993; 1996; 1997; 1999; 2001; 2003; 2005; 2007; 2009; 2011; 2013; 2015; 2017; 2019; 2021

Italy competed at the FIS Alpine World Ski Championships 1982 in Schladming, Austria, from 28 January to 7 February 1982.

== Medalists ==
Athlete	Gendre	Event	Medal
Daniela Zini	Women	Slalom	BRONZE

== Results ==
=== Men ===
Skier	Slalom	Giant slalom	Downhill	Combined
Paolo De Chiesa	4			
Pierino Gros	6	3		
Peter Mally	7			
Marco Tonazzi	DNF2			DNF
Bruno Noeckler		5		9
Riccardo Foppa		22		
Alex Giorgi		DNF1		
Giuseppe Carletti		DNF2		
Michael Mair			10	36
Oskar Delago			21	
Mauro Cornaz			27	
Giuliano Giardini				32

=== Women ===
Skier	Slalom	Giant slalom	Downhill	Combined
Daniela Zini	3	7		8
Ninna Quario	5	12		
Piera Macchi	11			
Wanda Bieler	15	DNF2		
Linda Rocchetti			24	13
Paoletta Magoni			29	

== See also ==
- Italy at the FIS Alpine World Ski Championships
- Italy national alpine ski team
