= Italy at the FIS Alpine World Ski Championships 2007 =

Italy at the 2007 FIS Alpine World Ski Championships
- IOC code: ITA
- National federation: FISI
- Website: www.fisi.org

in (Sweden) Åre
- Competitors: 22 (11 men, 11 women)
- Medals Ranked 6th: Gold 1 Silver 1 Bronze 1 Total 3

FIS Alpine World Ski Championships appearances (overview)
- 1931; 1932; 1933; 1934; 1935; 1936; 1937; 1938; 1939; 1948; 1950; 1952; 1954; 1956; 1958; 1960; 1962; 1964; 1966; 1968; 1970; 1972; 1974; 1976; 1978; 1980; 1982; 1985; 1987; 1989; 1991; 1993; 1996; 1997; 1999; 2001; 2003; 2005; 2007; 2009; 2011; 2013; 2015; 2017; 2019; 2021

Italy competed at the FIS Alpine World Ski Championships 2007 in Åre, Sweden, from 2 to 18 February 2007.

== Medalists ==
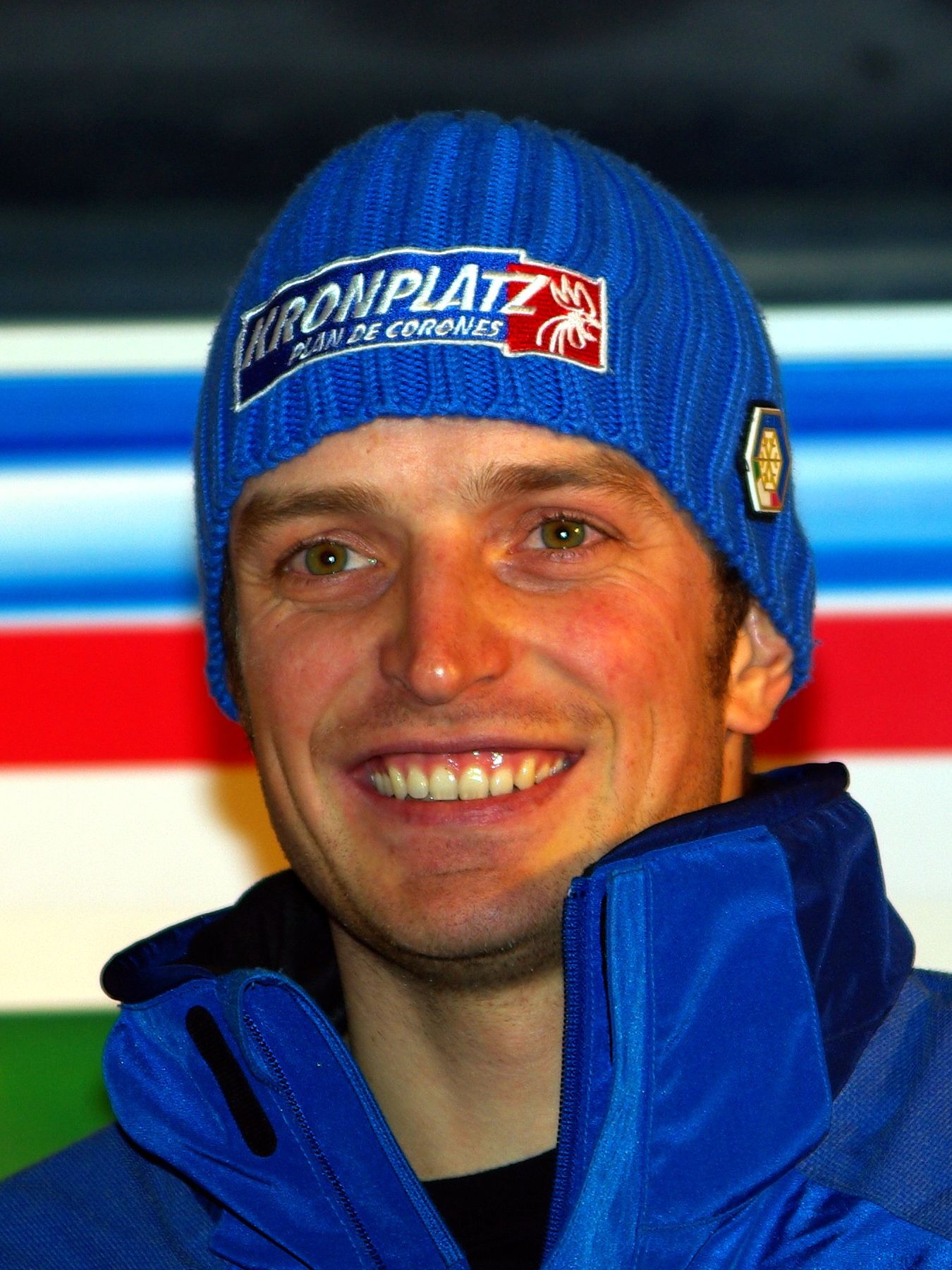
Manfred Mölgg silver medal in slalom.

Athlete	Gendre	Event	Medal
Patrick Staudacher	Men	Super-G	GOLD
Manfred Mölgg	Men	Slalom	SILVER
Denise Karbon	Women	Giant slalom	BRONZE

== Results ==
=== Men ===
Skier	Slalom	Giant slalom	Super-G	Downhill	Combined
Manfred Mölgg	2	19			
Cristian Deville	DNF2				
Giorgio Rocca	DNS2				
Patrick Thaler	DNF1				
Alberto Schieppati		5			
Peter Fill		23	14	11	13
Max Blardone		DNF1	16		
Patrick Staudacher			1	32	18
Werner Heel			27		DNF1
Kurt Sulzenbacher				14	
Christof Innerhofer				38	DSQ2

=== Women ===
Skier	Slalom	Giant slalom	Super-G	Downhill	Combined
Nicole Gius	12	20			
Manuela Mölgg	20	11			
Chiara Costazza	DNF2				
Annalisa Ceresa	DNF1				
Denise Karbon		3			
Karen Putzer		24			
Johanna Schnarf			18		17
Elena Fanchini			31	27	DNS2
Nadia Fanchini			DNF	13	DSQ2
Lucia Recchia			DNF	29	
Daniela Merighetti				17	15

== See also ==
- Italy at the FIS Alpine World Ski Championships
- Italy national alpine ski team
