= Italy at the FIS Alpine World Ski Championships 1985 =

Italy at the 1985 FIS Alpine World Ski Championships
- IOC code: ITA
- National federation: FISI
- Website: www.fisi.org

in (Italy) Bormio
- Competitors: 17 (10 men, 7 women)
- Medals Ranked 8th: Gold 0 Silver 0 Bronze 1 Total 1

FIS Alpine World Ski Championships appearances (overview)
- 1931; 1932; 1933; 1934; 1935; 1936; 1937; 1938; 1939; 1948; 1950; 1952; 1954; 1956; 1958; 1960; 1962; 1964; 1966; 1968; 1970; 1972; 1974; 1976; 1978; 1980; 1982; 1985; 1987; 1989; 1991; 1993; 1996; 1997; 1999; 2001; 2003; 2005; 2007; 2009; 2011; 2013; 2015; 2017; 2019; 2021

Italy competed at the FIS Alpine World Ski Championships 1985 in Bormio, Italy, from 31 January to 10 February 1985.

== Medalists ==
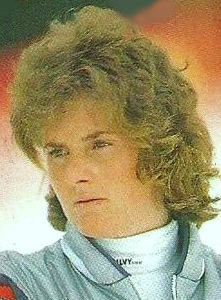
Paoletta Magoni the only Italian team medal won at this edition of the world championships.

Athlete	Gendre	Event	Medal
Paoletta Magoni	Women	Slalom	BRONZE

== Results ==
=== Men ===
Skier	Slalom	Giant slalom	Downhill	Combined
Paolo De Chiesa	6			
Ivano Edalini	9			12
Alex Giorgi	10	DNF2		
Oswald Toetsch	DNF1	9		
Robert Erlacher		6		10
Richard Pramotton		13		
Michael Mair			10	
Danilo Sbardellotto			13	
Giacomo Erlacher			21	
Mauro Cornaz			DNF	

=== Women ===
Skier	Slalom	Giant slalom	Downhill	Combined
Paoletta Magoni	3			
Cristina Brichetti	DSQ2			
Ninna Quario	DNF2			DNF
Daniela Zini	DNF2	DSQ2		
Karla Delago		19	29	22
Michaela Marzola		22	18	
Fulvia Stevenin		DNF2		

== See also ==
- Italy at the FIS Alpine World Ski Championships
- Italy national alpine ski team
