= Italy at the FIS Alpine World Ski Championships 1976 =

Italy at the 1976 FIS Alpine World Ski Championships
- IOC code: ITA
- National federation: FISI
- Website: www.fisi.org

in (Austria) Innsbruck
- Competitors: 12 (7 men, 5 Women)
- Medals Ranked 2nd: Gold 2 Silver 2 Bronze 1 Total 5

FIS Alpine World Ski Championships appearances (overview)
- 1931; 1932; 1933; 1934; 1935; 1936; 1937; 1938; 1939; 1948; 1950; 1952; 1954; 1956; 1958; 1960; 1962; 1964; 1966; 1968; 1970; 1972; 1974; 1976; 1978; 1980; 1982; 1985; 1987; 1989; 1991; 1993; 1996; 1997; 1999; 2001; 2003; 2005; 2007; 2009; 2011; 2013; 2015; 2017; 2019; 2021

Italy competed at the FIS Alpine World Ski Championships 1976 in Innsbruck, Austria, from 5 to 13 February 1976.

From 1948 through 1980, the alpine skiing events at the Winter Olympics also served as the World Championships, held every two years. With the addition of the giant slalom, the combined event was dropped for 1950 and 1952, but returned as a World Championship event in 1954 as a "paper race" which used the results from the three events. During the Olympics from 1956 through 1980, World Championship medals were awarded by the FIS for the combined event. The combined returned as a separate event at the World Championships in 1982 and at the Olympics in 1988.

== Medalists ==
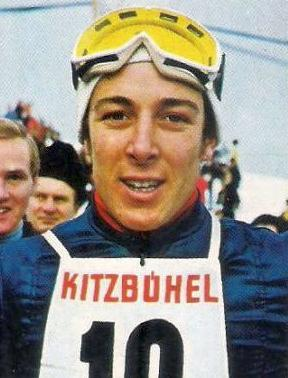
Gustav Thöni two medals won (one gold) at this edition of the world championships.

Athlete	Gendre	Event	Medal
Pierino Gros	Men	Slalom	GOLD
Gustav Thöni	Men	Combined	GOLD
Gustav Thöni	Men	Slalom	SILVER
Claudia Giordani	Women	Slalom	SILVER
Herbert Plank	Men	Downhill	BRONZE

== Results ==
=== Men ===
Skier	Slalom	Giant slalom	Downhill	Combined
Gustav Thöni	2	4	26	1
Pierino Gros	1	DNF2		
Fausto Radici	DNF1	7		
Franco Bieler	DNF2	8		
Herbert Plank			3	
Roland Thöni			14	
Erwin Stricker			DNF	

=== Women ===
In the combined ranking, being a paper race, the two Italian skiers who had taken part in all three competitions were classified.

Skier	Slalom	Giant slalom	Downhill	Combined
Claudia Giordani	2	13		
Wanda Bieler	8	DNF	20	Over 11
Wilma Gatta	DNF	7		
Paola Hofer	DNF	23	15	Over 11
Jolanda Plank			25	

== See also ==
- Italy at the 1976 Winter Olympics
- Italy at the FIS Alpine World Ski Championships
- Italy national alpine ski team
