= Italy at the FIS Alpine World Ski Championships 2021 =

Italy at the 2021 FIS Alpine World Ski Championships
- IOC code: ITA
- National federation: FISI
- Website: www.fisi.org

in (Italy) Cortina d'Ampezzo
- Competitors: 23 (13 men, 10 women)
- Medals Ranked 6th: Gold 1 Silver 1 Bronze 0 Total 2

FIS Alpine World Ski Championships appearances (overview)
- 1931; 1932; 1933; 1934; 1935; 1936; 1937; 1938; 1939; 1948; 1950; 1952; 1954; 1956; 1958; 1960; 1962; 1964; 1966; 1968; 1970; 1972; 1974; 1976; 1978; 1980; 1982; 1985; 1987; 1989; 1991; 1993; 1996; 1997; 1999; 2001; 2003; 2005; 2007; 2009; 2011; 2013; 2015; 2017; 2019; 2021

Italy competed at the FIS Alpine World Ski Championships 2021 in Cortina d'Ampezzo, Italy, from 8 to 21 February 2021.

== Medalists ==
Athlete	Gendre	Event	Medal
Marta Bassino	Women	Parallel giant slalom	GOLD
Luca De Aliprandini	Men	Giant slalom	SILVER

== Results ==
=== Men ===
Skier	Slalom	Giant slalom	Super-G	Downhill	Combined	Parallel giant slalom	Team event
Alex Vinatzer	4						
Manfred Mölgg	14						
Stefano Gross	DNF1						
Giuliano Razzoli	DSQ1						
Luca De Aliprandini		2nd				11	QF
Giovanni Borsotti		DNF2				22	QF
Riccardo Tonetti		12			7	23	
Giovanni Franzoni		14			23	DNF	
Dominik Paris			5	4			
Emanuele Buzzi			13				
Matteo Marsaglia			19	24			
Christof Innerhofer			23	6	14		
Florian Schieder				DNF			

=== Women ===
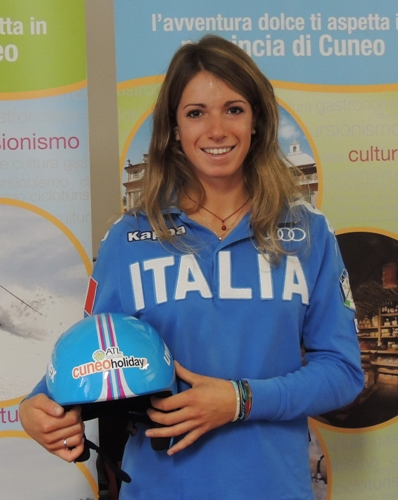
Marta Bassino gold medal in parallel giant slalom ex-aequo with the Austrian Katharina Liensberger.

Skier	Slalom	Giant slalom	Super-G	Downhill	Combined	Parallel giant slalom	Team event
Irene Curtoni	18						
Martina Peterlini	19						
Anita Gulli	26						
Federica Brignone	DNF1	DNF1	10		DNF2	QF	
Marta Bassino		13	11		6	1	
Laura Pirovano		26		12		35	QF
Elena Curtoni		DNS2	18	8	4		
Francesca Marsaglia			23	17			
Nadia Delago				15	DNF1		QF
Lara Della Mea						18	QF

== See also ==
- Italy at the FIS Alpine World Ski Championships
- Italy national alpine ski team
