= Italy at the FIS Alpine World Ski Championships 2009 =

Italy at the 2009 FIS Alpine World Ski Championships
- IOC code: ITA
- National federation: FISI
- Website: www.fisi.org

in (France) Val-d'Isère
- Competitors: 23 (12 men, 11 women)
- Medals Ranked 8th: Gold 0 Silver 1 Bronze 1 Total 2

FIS Alpine World Ski Championships appearances (overview)
- 1931; 1932; 1933; 1934; 1935; 1936; 1937; 1938; 1939; 1948; 1950; 1952; 1954; 1956; 1958; 1960; 1962; 1964; 1966; 1968; 1970; 1972; 1974; 1976; 1978; 1980; 1982; 1985; 1987; 1989; 1991; 1993; 1996; 1997; 1999; 2001; 2003; 2005; 2007; 2009; 2011; 2013; 2015; 2017; 2019; 2021

Italy competed at the FIS Alpine World Ski Championships 2009 in Val-d'Isère, France, from 2 to 15 February 2009.

== Medalists ==
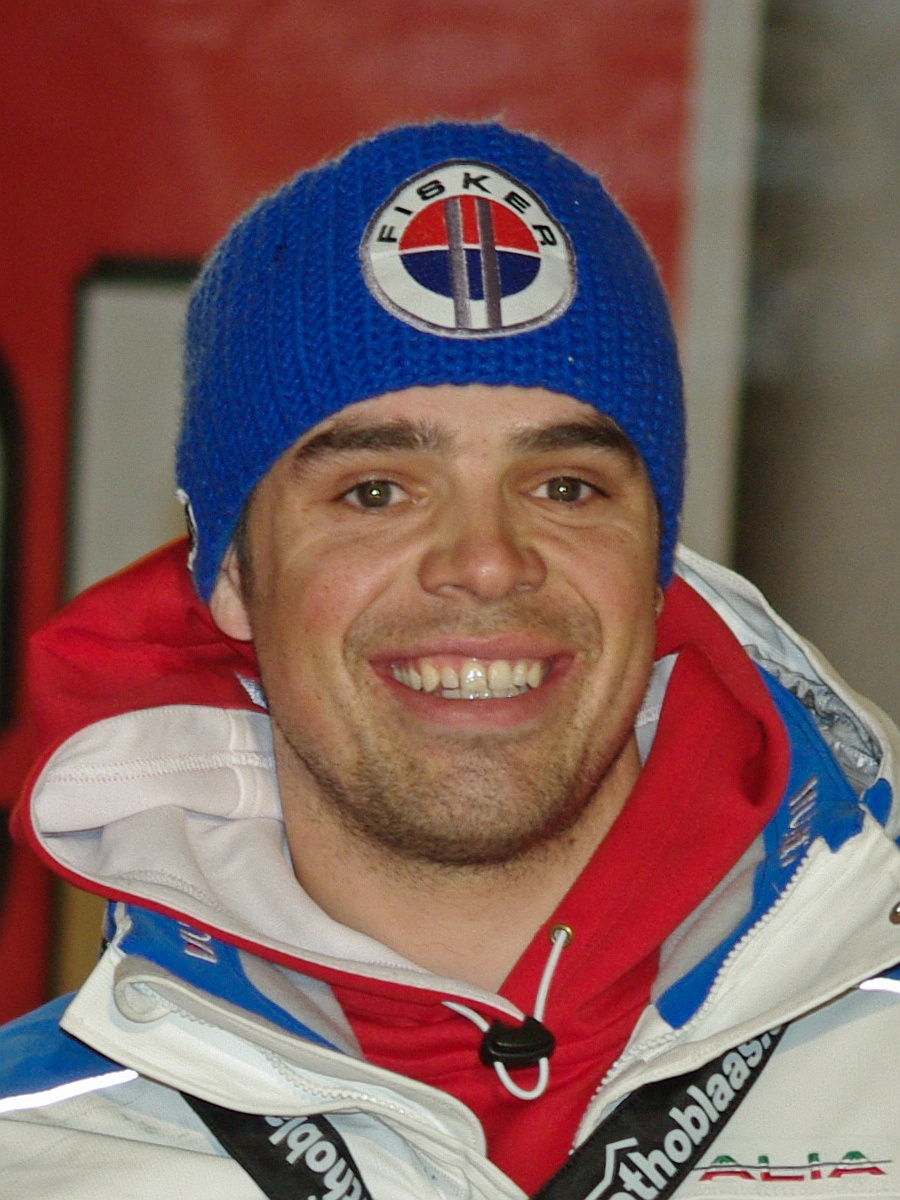
Peter Fill silver medal in super-G.

Athlete	Gendre	Event	Medal
Peter Fill	Men	Super-G	SILVER
Nadia Fanchini	Women	Downhill	BRONZE

== Results ==
=== Men ===
Skier	Slalom	Giant slalom	Super-G	Downhill	Combined
Manfred Mölgg	DNF1	12			
Patrick Thaler	7				
Giorgio Rocca	DNS2				
Giuliano Razzoli	DNF1				
Max Blardone		5			
Alexander Ploner		8			
Davide Simoncelli		11			
Peter Fill			2	14	5
Christof Innerhofer			4	10	15
Werner Heel			14	7	
Stefan Thanei			15	16	21
Patrick Staudacher			17		18

=== Women ===
Skier	Slalom	Giant slalom	Super-G	Downhill	Combined
Denise Karbon	4	4			
Nicole Gius	5	DNF2			
Manuela Mölgg	DSQ1	DNF1			
Irene Curtoni	DSQ1				
Karen Putzer		20			
Nadia Fanchini			9	3	
Wendy Siorpaes			21	8	
Lucia Recchia			DNF		
Daniela Merighetti			DNF	16	DNF
Verena Stuffer				23	
Johanna Schnarf					6

== See also ==
- Italy at the FIS Alpine World Ski Championships
- Italy national alpine ski team
