= Italy at the FIS Alpine World Ski Championships 1974 =

Italy at the 1974 FIS Alpine World Ski Championships
- IOC code: ITA
- National federation: FISI
- Website: www.fisi.org

in (Switzerland) St. Moritz
- Competitors: 14 (8 men, 6 women)
- Medals Ranked 3rd: Gold 2 Silver 0 Bronze 1 Total 3

FIS Alpine World Ski Championships appearances (overview)
- 1931; 1932; 1933; 1934; 1935; 1936; 1937; 1938; 1939; 1948; 1950; 1952; 1954; 1956; 1958; 1960; 1962; 1964; 1966; 1968; 1970; 1972; 1974; 1976; 1978; 1980; 1982; 1985; 1987; 1989; 1991; 1993; 1996; 1997; 1999; 2001; 2003; 2005; 2007; 2009; 2011; 2013; 2015; 2017; 2019; 2021

Italy competed at the FIS Alpine World Ski Championships 1974 in St. Moritz, Switzerland, from 3 to 10 February 1974.

== Medalists ==
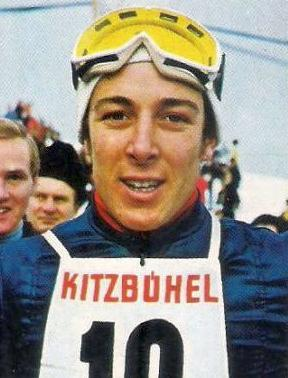
Gustav Thöni two gold medals won at this edition of the world championships.

Athlete	Gendre	Event	Medal
Gustav Thöni	Men	Slalom	GOLD
Gustav Thöni	Men	Giant slalom	GOLD
Pierino Gros	Men	Giant slalom	BRONZE

== Results ==
=== Men ===
Skier	Slalom	Giant slalom	Downhill	Combined
Gustav Thöni	1	1		
Pierino Gros	DNF2	3		
Fausto Radici	DNF2			
Erwin Stricker	DNF1	6	17	DNF
Helmuth Schmalzl		4		
Marcello Varallo			DSQ	
Giuliano Besson			5	
Stefano Anzi			7	

=== Women ===
Skier	Slalom	Giant slalom	Downhill	Combined
Claudia Giordani	5	DNF	DNF	DNF
Patrizia Siorpaes	20			
Sieglinde Zemmer	26			
Cristina Tisot	DNF1	13	6	DNF
Manuela Fasoli		29		
Paola Hofer		31	25	
Maddalena Silvestri			DNF	

== See also ==
- Italy at the FIS Alpine World Ski Championships
- Italy national alpine ski team
