= Italy at the FIS Alpine World Ski Championships 1972 =

Italy at the 1972 FIS Alpine World Ski Championships
- IOC code: ITA
- National federation: FISI
- Website: www.fisi.org

in (Japan) Sapporo
- Competitors: 8 (8 men)
- Medals Ranked 2nd: Gold 2 Silver 1 Bronze 1 Total 4

FIS Alpine World Ski Championships appearances (overview)
- 1931; 1932; 1933; 1934; 1935; 1936; 1937; 1938; 1939; 1948; 1950; 1952; 1954; 1956; 1958; 1960; 1962; 1964; 1966; 1968; 1970; 1972; 1974; 1976; 1978; 1980; 1982; 1985; 1987; 1989; 1991; 1993; 1996; 1997; 1999; 2001; 2003; 2005; 2007; 2009; 2011; 2013; 2015; 2017; 2019; 2021

Italy competed at the FIS Alpine World Ski Championships 1972 in Sapporo, Japan, from 2 to 18 February 1972.

From 1948 through 1980, the alpine skiing events at the Winter Olympics also served as the World Championships, held every two years. With the addition of the giant slalom, the combined event was dropped for 1950 and 1952, but returned as a World Championship event in 1954 as a "paper race" which used the results from the three events. During the Olympics from 1956 through 1980, World Championship medals were awarded by the FIS for the combined event. The combined returned as a separate event at the World Championships in 1982 and at the Olympics in 1988.

== Medalists ==
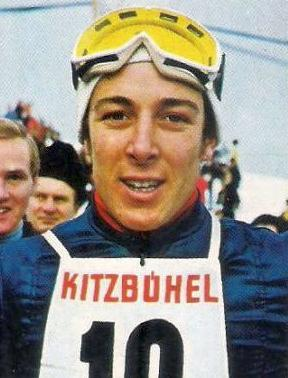
Gustav Thöni three medals won (two gold) at this edition of the world championships.

| Athlete | Gendre | Event | Medal |
|---|---|---|---|
| Gustav Thöni | Men | Giant slalom | GOLD |
| Gustav Thöni | Men | Combined | GOLD |
| Gustav Thöni | Men | Slalom | SILVER |
| Roland Thöni | Men | Slalom | BRONZE |

== Results ==
=== Men ===
| Skier | Slalom | Giant slalom | Downhill | Combined |
|---|---|---|---|---|
| Gustav Thöni | 2 | 1 | 13 | 1 |
| Roland Thöni | 3 | 27 | | |
| Eberhard Schmalzl | 6 | 13 | | |
| Erwin Stricker | DSQ1 | | | |
| Helmuth Schmalzl | | 16 | | |
| Marcello Varallo | | | 10 | |
| Giuliano Besson | | | 11 | |
| Stefano Anzi | | | 11 | |

=== Women ===
No Italian female skier participates in the 1972 Winter Olympics (Alpine Ski World Championships) in this edition.

== See also ==
- Italy at the 1972 Winter Olympics
- Italy at the FIS Alpine World Ski Championships
- Italy national alpine ski team
