= Italy at the FIS Alpine World Ski Championships 2019 =

Italy at the 2019 FIS Alpine World Ski Championships
- IOC code: ITA
- National federation: FISI
- Website: www.fisi.org

in (Italy) Åre
- Competitors: 20 (11 men, 9 women)
- Medals Ranked 5th: Gold 1 Silver 1 Bronze 1 Total 3

FIS Alpine World Ski Championships appearances (overview)
- 1931; 1932; 1933; 1934; 1935; 1936; 1937; 1938; 1939; 1948; 1950; 1952; 1954; 1956; 1958; 1960; 1962; 1964; 1966; 1968; 1970; 1972; 1974; 1976; 1978; 1980; 1982; 1985; 1987; 1989; 1991; 1993; 1996; 1997; 1999; 2001; 2003; 2005; 2007; 2009; 2011; 2013; 2015; 2017; 2019; 2021

Italy competed at the FIS Alpine World Ski Championships 2019 in Åre, Sweden, from 4 to 17 February 2019.

== Medalists ==
| Athlete | Gendre | Event | Medal |
|---|---|---|---|
| Dominik Paris | Men | Super-G | GOLD |
| Sofia Goggia | Women | Super-G | SILVER |
| Marta Bassino; Irene Curtoni; Lara Della Mea; Simon Maurberger; Riccardo Tonetti; Alex Vinatzer | Mixed | Team event | BRONZE |

== Results ==
=== Men ===
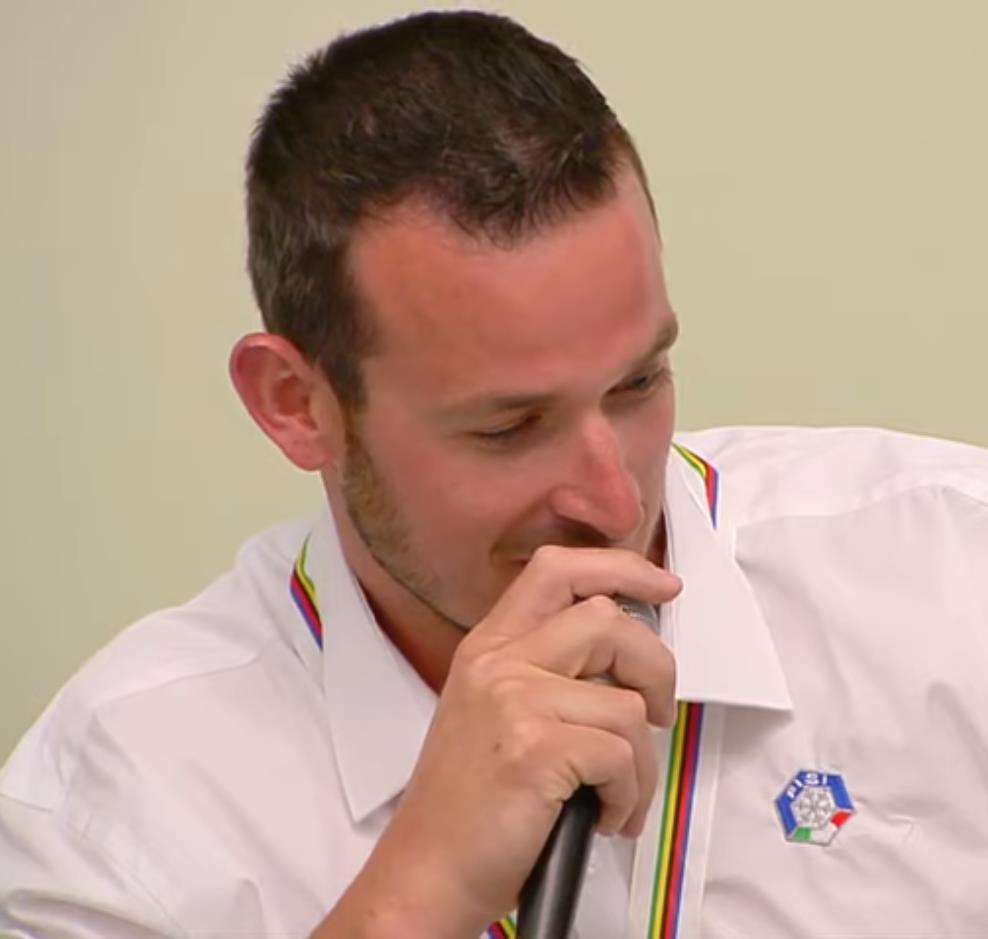
Dominik Paris gold medal in Super-G.

| Skier | Slalom | Giant slalom | Super-G | Downhill | Combined | Team event |
|---|---|---|---|---|---|---|
| Stefano Gross | 10 | | | | | |
| Manfred Mölgg | 18 | DNS2 | | | | |
| Alex Vinatzer | 19 | | | | | 3 |
| Giuliano Razzoli | 22 | | | | | |
| Luca De Aliprandini | | 20 | | | | |
| Simon Maurberger | | 23 | | | | 3 |
| Riccardo Tonetti | | DNF1 | | | 4 | 3 |
| Dominik Paris | | | 1 | 6 | 9 | |
| Christof Innerhofer | | | 4 | 11 | DNF | |
| Mattia Casse | | | 8 | 17 | 27 | |
| Matteo Marsaglia | | | 45 | 13 | | |

=== Women ===
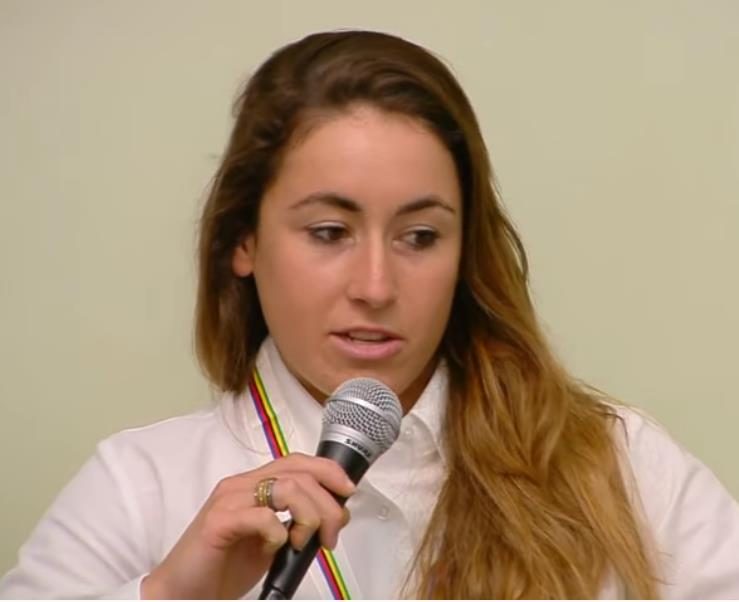
Sofia Goggia silver medal in Super-G.

| Skier | Slalom | Giant slalom | Super-G | Downhill | Combined | Team event |
|---|---|---|---|---|---|---|
| Chiara Costazza | 20 | | | | | |
| Irene Curtoni | DNF1 | | | | | 3 |
| Lara Della Mea | DNF2 | | | | | 3 |
| Federica Brignone | | 5 | 10 | | 6 | |
| Marta Bassino | | 13 | | 13 | 6 | 3 |
| Francesca Marsaglia | | DNF2 | 7 | 29 | | |
| Sofia Goggia | | DNF2 | 2 | 15 | | |
| Nadia Fanchini | | | 5 | 14 | | |
| Nicol Delago | | | | 6 | 12 | |

== See also ==
- Italy at the FIS Alpine World Ski Championships
- Italy national alpine ski team
