= Italy at the FIS Alpine World Ski Championships 1933 =

Italy at the 1933 FIS Alpine World Ski Championships
- IOC code: ITA
- National federation: FISI
- Website: www.fisi.org

in (Austria) Innsbruck
- Competitors: 11 (6 men, 5 women)
- Medals Ranked -th: Gold 0 Silver 0 Bronze 0 Total 0

FIS Alpine World Ski Championships appearances (overview)
- 1931; 1932; 1933; 1934; 1935; 1936; 1937; 1938; 1939; 1948; 1950; 1952; 1954; 1956; 1958; 1960; 1962; 1964; 1966; 1968; 1970; 1972; 1974; 1976; 1978; 1980; 1982; 1985; 1987; 1989; 1991; 1993; 1996; 1997; 1999; 2001; 2003; 2005; 2007; 2009; 2011; 2013; 2015; 2017; 2019; 2021

Italy competed at the FIS Alpine World Ski Championships 1933 in Innsbruck, Austria, from 6 to 10 February 1933.

== Medalists ==
At this third edition of the world championships, Italy won no medal.

== Results ==
=== Men ===
Skier	Slalom	Downhill	Combined
Renato Valle	15	13	13
Enrico Lacedelli	25	24	26
Renato Dimai	27	20	25
Dario Demenego	33	26	29
Sisto Gilarduzzi	35	10	24
Andrea Lacedelli	37	32	32

=== Women ===
Skier	Slalom	Downhill	Combined
Paola Wiesinger	19	4	11
Elena Schott	18	16	18
Isaline Crivelli	27	18	21
Ofelia Zardini	26	27	24

== See also ==
- Italy at the FIS Alpine World Ski Championships
- Italy national alpine ski team
