= Italy at the FIS Alpine World Ski Championships 1931 =

Italy at the 1931 FIS Alpine World Ski Championships
- IOC code: ITA
- National federation: FISI
- Website: www.fisi.org

in (Switzerland) Mürren
- Competitors: 1 (1 men, 0 women)
- Medals Ranked -th: Gold 0 Silver 0 Bronze 0 Total 0

FIS Alpine World Ski Championships appearances (overview)
- 1931; 1932; 1933; 1934; 1935; 1936; 1937; 1938; 1939; 1948; 1950; 1952; 1954; 1956; 1958; 1960; 1962; 1964; 1966; 1968; 1970; 1972; 1974; 1976; 1978; 1980; 1982; 1985; 1987; 1989; 1991; 1993; 1996; 1997; 1999; 2001; 2003; 2005; 2007; 2009; 2011; 2013; 2015; 2017; 2019; 2021

Italy competed at the FIS Alpine World Ski Championships 1931 in Mürren, Switzerland, from 19 to 23 February 1931. It was the first edition of the world championships.

== Medalists ==
At this first edition of the world championships, Italy won no medal.

== Results ==
Carlo Barassi was the only Italian athlete to participate in competitions, however, finishing all races in last position.

=== Men ===
Skier	Slalom	Downhill	Combined
Carlo Barassi	20	25	16

=== Women ===
No Italian woman took part in this first edition of the world championships.

== See also ==
- Italy at the FIS Alpine World Ski Championships
- Italy national alpine ski team
