= Italy at the FIS Alpine World Ski Championships 1989 =

Italy at the 1989 FIS Alpine World Ski Championships
- IOC code: ITA
- National federation: FISI
- Website: www.fisi.org

in (United States) Vail
- Medals Ranked -th: Gold 0 Silver 0 Bronze 0 Total 0

FIS Alpine World Ski Championships appearances (overview)
- 1931; 1932; 1933; 1934; 1935; 1936; 1937; 1938; 1939; 1948; 1950; 1952; 1954; 1956; 1958; 1960; 1962; 1964; 1966; 1968; 1970; 1972; 1974; 1976; 1978; 1980; 1982; 1985; 1987; 1989; 1991; 1993; 1996; 1997; 1999; 2001; 2003; 2005; 2007; 2009; 2011; 2013; 2015; 2017; 2019; 2021

Italy competed at the FIS Alpine World Ski Championships 1989 in Vail, United States, from 2 to 12 February 1989.

== Medalists ==
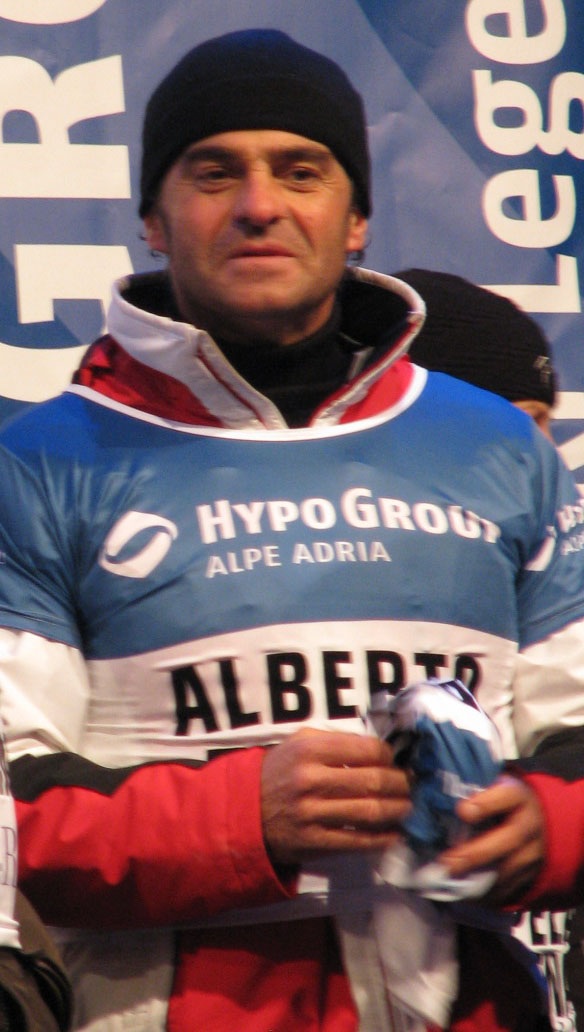
Alberto Tomba, 6th place in super-G and 7th in giant slalom.

At this third edition of the world championships, Italy won no medal.

== Results ==
=== Top 15 finished ===
==== Men ====
Skier	Slalom	Giant slalom	Super-G	Downhill	Combined
Alberto Tomba	DNF1	7	6		
Danilo Sbardellotto				13	
Josef Polig					9

==== Women ====
Skier	Slalom	Giant slalom	Super-G	Downhill	Combined
Cecilia Lucco	11				

== See also ==
- Italy at the FIS Alpine World Ski Championships
- Italy national alpine ski team
