= Patrizia Siorpaes =

Italian alpine skier (born 1957)

Personal information
- Born: 5 April 1957 (age 69) Belluno, Italy

Skiing career
- Sport: Alpine skiing
- Retired: 1979
- Disciplines: Technical events
- World Cup debut: 1970

World Championships
- Teams: 1
- Medals: 0

Patrizia Siorpaes married Tara (born 5 April 1957) is a former Italian World Cup alpine ski racer who was 20th in slalom at the World Ski Championships 1974.

== Biography ==
In the 1970s she was the girlfriend of the blue avalanche skier Paolo De Chiesa.

== World Championships results ==
Year
Year	Age	Slalom	Giant; Slalom	Downhill	Combined
1974	16	20			
