= Annalisa Ceresa =

Italian alpine skier (born 1978)

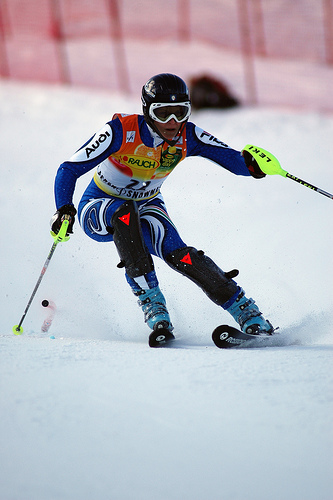
Annalisa Ceresa

Annalisa Ceresa (born 17 March 1978) is an Italian former alpine skier who competed in the 2006 Winter Olympics.
