= Renato Valle =

Italian alpine skier

Personal information
- Born: Cortina d'Ampezzo, Italy

Skiing career
- Sport: Alpine skiing
- Disciplines: Polyvalent

Renato Valle was an alpine ski racer from Italy who participated to two editions of the Alpine World Ski Championships (1932, 1933).

== Biography ==
Valle was from Cortina d'Ampezzo and in 1932 he founded the first Italian ski school in Roccaraso together with his brother Ferdinando and Paolino Pompanin.

== World Championships results ==
Year	Age	Slalom	Downhill	Combined
1932		7	5	8
1933		15	13	13
