= Carlo Barassi =

Italian alpine skier

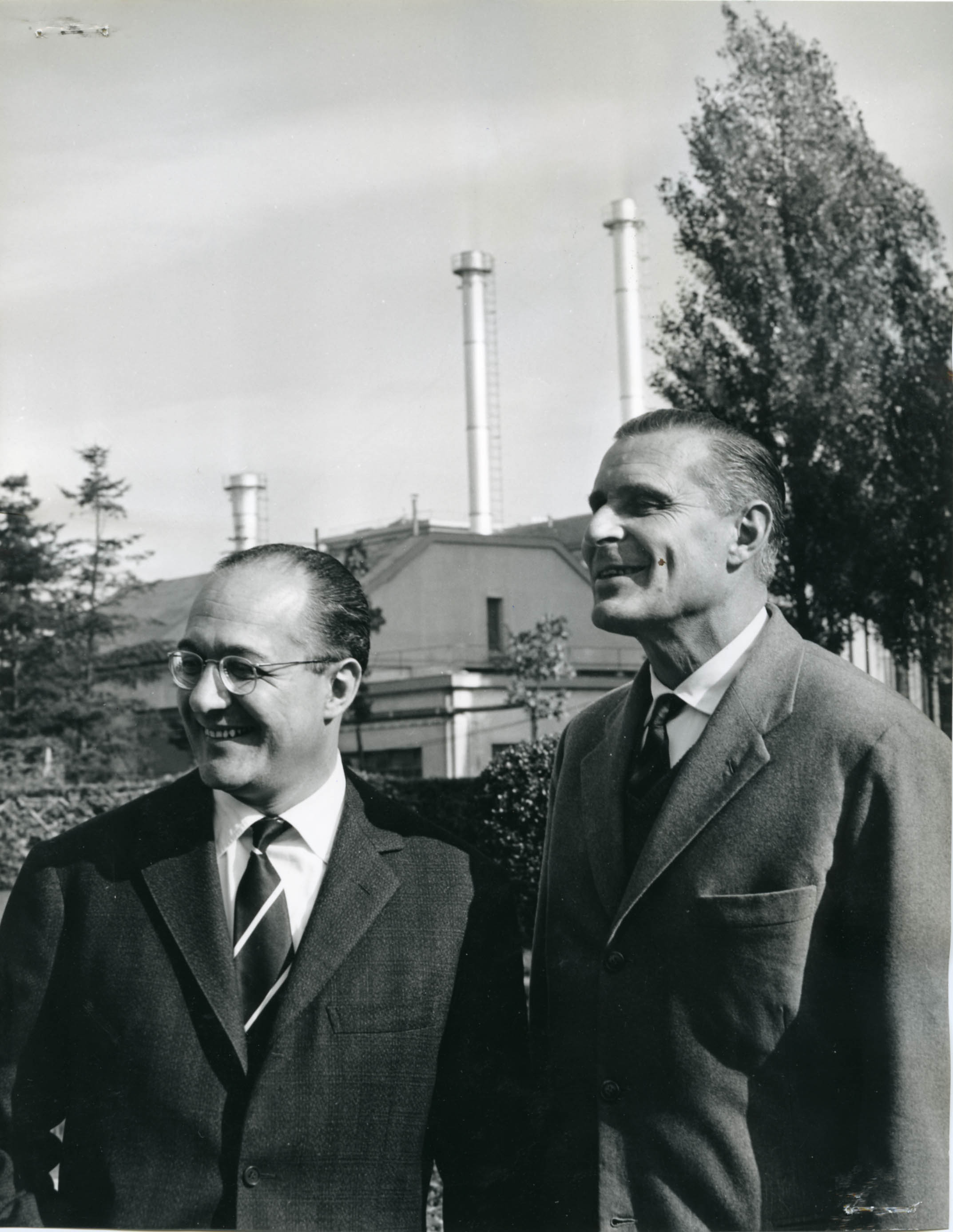
- Carlo Barassi, on the right, in 1959.

Personal information
- Born: 1910 Milan, Italy
- Died: Unknown

Skiing career
- Sport: Alpine skiing
- Disciplines: Polyvalent

Carlo Barassi (1910–?) was an alpine ski racer from Italy.

== Biography ==
Graduated in engineering in 1933 at the age of 23, he worked for Pirelli. Passionate about skiing, so much so that he was the first Italian in history to have taken part in the Alpine World Ski Championship in Mürren 1931, he provided the idea for the invention of the ski rack.

Furthermore, in 1948 he patented the ribbons for Olivetti typewriters and in 1959 he patented the winter snow tires, the Pirelli BS3 tire.

== World Championships results ==
Barassi closed in last place all three races in which he participated.

Year
Year	Age	Slalom	Downhill	Combined
1931	21	25	20	16

== See also ==
- Arflex
