= Eberhard Schmalzl =

Italian alpine skier (born 1950)

Eberhard Schmalzl (born 12 June 1950 in Brixen) is an Italian former alpine skier who competed in the 1972 Winter Olympics.
