= Cristina Gravina =

Italian alpine skier (born 1960)

Cristina Gravina (born 8 February 1960 in Bolzano) is a retired Italian alpine skier. She competed in the 1980 Winter Olympics and was ranked 15th in the women's downhill.
