= Anita Gulli =

Italian alpine skier (born 1998)

Personal information
- Born: 26 June 1998 (age 28) Turin, Italy

Skiing career
- Sport: Alpine skiing
- Club: C.S. Esercito
- Disciplines: Technical events
- World Cup debut: 2015

World Championships
- Teams: 1
- Medals: 0

World Cup
- Seasons: 6
- Podiums: 0

Anita Gulli (born 26 June 1998) is an Italian World Cup alpine ski racer

== World Championship results ==
Year
Year	Age	Slalom	Giant; Slalom	Super-G	Downhill	Combined
2021	22	26	-	-	-	-
