= Mauro Cornaz =

Italian alpine skier (born 1960)

Personal information
- Born: 25 March 1960 (age 66) Gressan, Italy

Skiing career
- Sport: Alpine skiing
- Retired: 1985
- Disciplines: Speed events
- World Cup debut: 1982

World Championships
- Teams: 2
- Medals: 0

World Cup
- Seasons: 4
- Podiums: 0

Mauro Cornaz (born 25 March 1960) is a former Italian World Cup alpine ski racer who competed in two editions (1982 and 1985) of the FIS Alpine World Ski Championships.

== World Championships results ==
Year
Year	Age	Slalom	Giant; Slalom	Downhill	Combined
1982	21	-	-	27	-
1985	24	-	-	DNF	-

== National titles ==
Cornaz has won a national title.

- Italian Alpine Ski Championships
  - Downhill: 1984
