= Wilma Gatta =

Italian alpine skier (born 1956)

Personal information
- Nationality: Italian
- Born: December 1, 1956 (age 68) Tione di Trento

Sport
- Sport: Alpine skiing

Wilma Gatta (born 1 December 1956) is an Italian former alpine skier who competed in two consecutive Winter Olympic Games.

== Career ==
Gatta qualified for the 1976 Winter Olympics in Innsbruck in both the slalom and giant slalom events. She failed to finish her first run in the slalom, but went on to finish in 7th place in the giant slalom.

She qualified for the 1980 Winter Olympics in Lake Placid completing in the slalom, finishing in 10th place.
