= Danilo Sbardellotto =

Italian alpine skier (born 1960)

Personal information
- Born: 23 October 1960 (age 65) Valdisotto, Italy
- Height: 1.80 m (5 ft 11 in)

Skiing career
- Sport: Alpine skiing
- Club: G.S. Fiamme Gialle
- Retired: 1992
- Disciplines: Speed events
- World Cup debut: 1980

Olympics
- Teams: 3
- Medals: 0

World Championships
- Teams: 3
- Medals: 0

World Cup
- Seasons: 11
- Podiums: 2

Danilo Sbardellotto (born 23 October 1960) is an Italian former alpine skier who competed in the 1984 Winter Olympics, 1988 Winter Olympics, and 1992 Winter Olympics.
