= Michael Mair =

Italian former Alpine skier

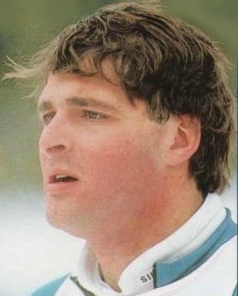

Personal information
- Born: 13 February 1962 (age 64) Brunico, Italy
- Height: 1.92 m (6 ft 4 in)

Skiing career
- Sport: Alpine skiing
- Club: C.S. Carabinieri
- Retired: 1992
- World Cup debut: 1982

Olympics
- Teams: 2

World Championships
- Teams: 2

World Cup
- Seasons: 10
- Wins: 3
- Podiums: 16
- Overall titles: 0 (best 10th 1988)
Medal record
World Cup race podiums
Event	1st	2nd	3rd
Downhill	2	6	5
Super-G	1	0	0
Combined	0	1	1
Total	3	7	6

Michael "Much" Mair (born 13 February 1962) is an Italian alpine skiing coach and former Alpine skier. Born in Bruneck, Italy, he won a total of three World Cup races.

== Career ==
He closed 10th in overall in 1988 Alpine Skiing World Cup. He also competed at the 1984 Winter Olympics and the 1988 Winter Olympics.

In 2018 Mair is one of the coaches of the Italy national alpine ski team (women sector). Much Mair has returned to coach Ester Ledecka starting from the 2025-26 season.

== World Cup victories ==
Date	Location	Race
21 December 1982	(Italy) Madonna di Campiglio	Super-G
7 December 1985	(Italy) Val Gardena	Downhill
January 23, 1988	(Switzerland) Leukerbad	Downhill

== See also ==
- Italian skiers who closed in top 10 in overall World Cup
