= Christof Innerhofer =

Italian alpine skier (born 1984)

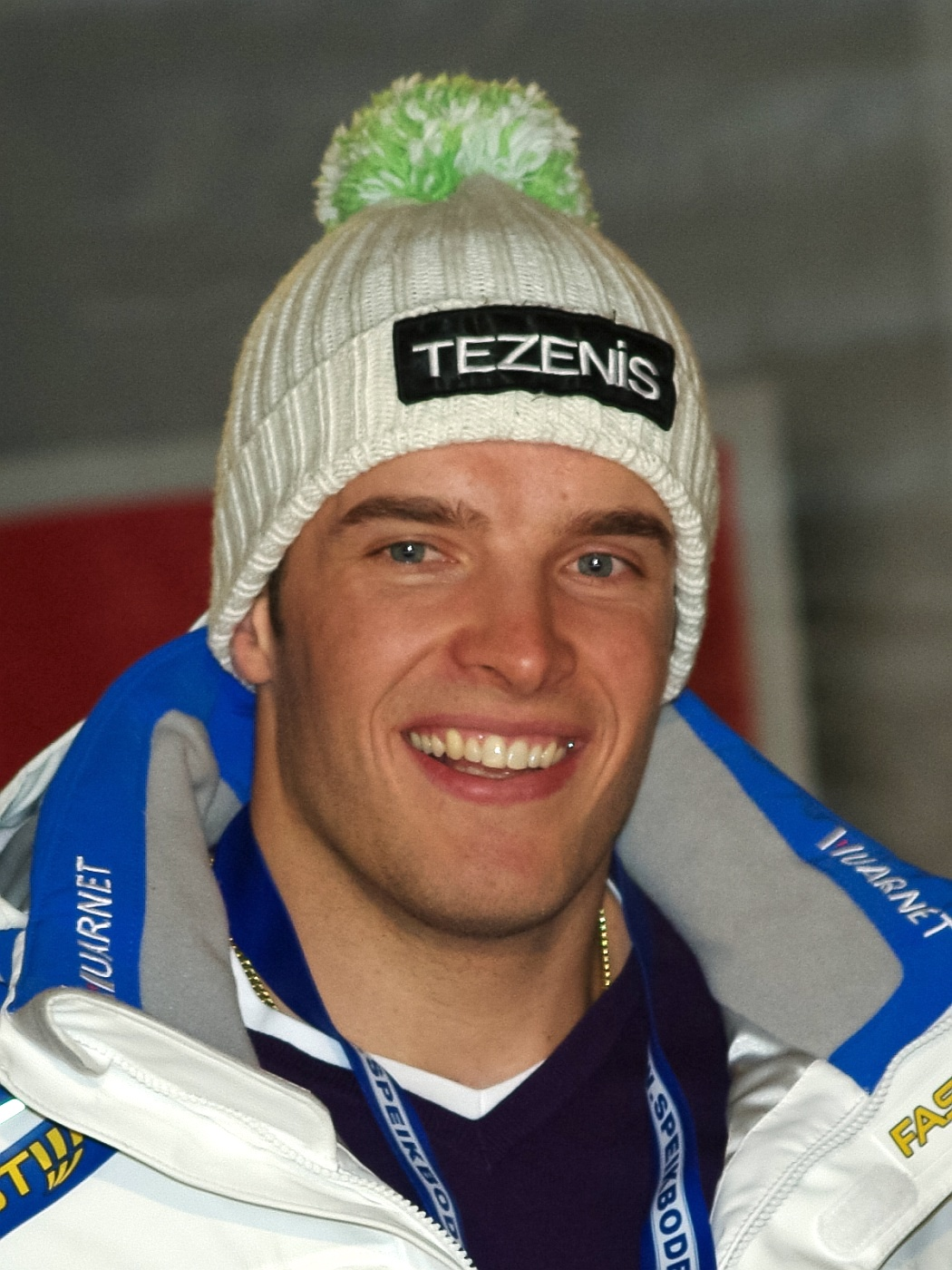
- Innerhofer in 2011

Personal information
- Born: 17 December 1984 (age 41) Bruneck, South Tyrol, Italy
- Height: 1.86 m (6 ft 1 in)
- Website: christof-innerhofer.com

Skiing career
- Country: Italy
- Sport: Alpine skiing
- Club: Gr. Sciatori Fiamme Gialle
- Disciplines: Downhill, Super-G, Combined
- World Cup debut: 12 November 2006 (age 21)

Olympics
- Teams: 5 – (2010–2026)
- Medals: 2 (0 gold)

World Championships
- Teams: 9 – (2007–2015, 2019–2025)
- Medals: 3 (1 gold)

World Cup
- Seasons: 20 – (2007–2026)
- Wins: 6 – (4 DH, 1 SG, 1 AC)
- Podiums: 18 – (8 DH, 7 SG, 2 AC)
- Overall titles: 0 – (8th in 2011)
- Discipline titles: 0 – (2nd in AC, 2011)
Medal record
Men's alpine skiing
Representing Italy
International alpine ski competitions
Event	1st	2nd	3rd
Olympic Games	0	1	1
World Championships	1	1	1
Total	1	2	2
World Cup race podiums
Event	1st	2nd	3rd
Downhill	4	3	2
Super-G	1	4	2
Combined	1	0	1
Total	6	7	5
Olympic Games
Silver medal – second place	2014 Sochi	Downhill
Bronze medal – third place	2014 Sochi	Combined
World Championships
Gold medal – first place	2011 Garmisch-Partenkirchen	Super-G
Silver medal – second place	2011 Garmisch-Partenkirchen	Combined
Bronze medal – third place	2011 Garmisch-Partenkirchen	Downhill

Christof Innerhofer (born 17 December 1984) is an Italian World Cup alpine ski racer, the 2011 world champion in super-G. He competed in all five alpine disciplines and specializes in the speed events of downhill and super-G.

== Biography ==
Born in Bruneck, Innerhofer lives in Gais, South Tyrol. He made his World Cup debut at age 21 in November 2006, and won his first race in December 2008, a downhill at Bormio.

At the 2011 World Championships in Garmisch-Partenkirchen, Germany, Innerhofer won a medal of each color: gold in super-G, silver in super combined, and bronze in downhill. At the first World Cup race following the World Championships, Innerhofer won the super combined at Bansko, Bulgaria. The race was unusual in that the slalom portion was run first, in anticipation of fog; the afternoon speed run was a super-G, rather than a downhill.

== World Cup results ==
=== Season standings ===
Season
Season	Age	Overall	Slalom	Giant slalom	Super-G	Downhill	Combined
2007	22	97	—	—	38	51	31
2008	23	33	—	—	20	23	14
2009	24	11	52	33	5	10	12
2010	25	38	59	—	21	28	17
2011	26	8	59	—	9	8	2nd place, silver medalist(s)
2012	27	17	—	49	10	16	9
2013	28	10	—	—	13	4	10
2014	29	14	—	—	12	11	9
2015	30	46	—	—	21	29	27
2016	31	19	—	—	11	12	26
2017	32	47	—	—	12	30	—
2018	33	20	—	—	7	13	21
2019	34	16	—	—	10	6	—
2020	35	112	—	—	39	46	—
2021	36	27	—	—	11	12	—N/a
2022	37	42	—	—	23	20	—N/a
2023	38	61	—	—	27	32	—N/a
2024	39	67	—	—	34	28	—N/a
2025	40	70	—	—	25	34	—N/a
2026	41	45	—	—	20	23	—N/a

=== Race podiums ===
- 6 wins – (4 DH, 1 SG, 1 AC)
- 18 podiums – (9 DH, 7 SG, 2 AC)

Season
Season	Date	Location	Discipline	Place
2009	28 December 2008	Bormio, Italy	Downhill	1st
2009	22 February 2009	Sestriere, Italy	Combined	3rd
2009	12 March 2009	Åre, Sweden	Super-G	3rd
2011	29 December 2010	Bormio, Italy	Downhill	3rd
2011	26 February 2011	Bansko, Bulgaria	Combined	1st
2012	14 January 2012	Wengen, Switzerland	Downhill	3rd
2012	15 March 2012	Schladming, Austria	Super-G	1st
2013	30 November 2012	Beaver Creek, United States	Downhill	1st
2013	19 January 2013	Wengen, Switzerland	Downhill	1st
2013	25 January 2013	Kitzbühel, Austria	Super-G	3rd
2013	23 February 2013	Garmisch-Partenkirchen, Germany	Downhill	1st
2014	12 March 2014	Lenzerheide, Switzerland	Downhill	2nd
2016	7 February 2016	Jeongseon, South Korea	Super-G	2nd
2017	20 January 2017	Kitzbühel, Austria	Super-G	2nd
2018	15 March 2018	Åre, Sweden	Super-G	2nd
2019	24 November 2018	Lake Louise, Canada	Downhill	2nd
2019	14 December 2018	Val Gardena, Italy	Super-G	2nd
2019	28 December 2018	Bormio, Italy	Downhill	2nd

== World Championship results ==
Year
Year	Age	Slalom	Giant slalom	Super-G	Downhill	Combined	Team combined
2007	22	—	—	—	38	DSQ2	—N/a
2009	24	—	—	4	10	15	—N/a
2011	26	—	—	1	3	2	—N/a
2013	28	—	—	7	14	DNF2	—N/a
2015	30	—	—	18	24	18	—N/a
2017	32	Injured: did not compete					—N/a
2019	34	—	—	4	11	DNF2	—N/a
2021	36	—	—	23	6	14	—N/a
2023	38	—	—	20	—	—	—N/a
2025	40	—	—	24	—	—N/a	DNF2

== Olympic results ==
Year
Year	Age	Slalom	Giant slalom	Super-G	Downhill	Combined	Team combined
2010	25	—	—	6	19	8	—N/a
2014	29	—	—	DNF	2	3	—N/a
2018	33	—	—	16	17	14	—N/a
2022	37	—	—	DNF	DNF	10	—N/a
2026	41	—	—	11	—	—N/a	—

== See also ==
- Italians most on the podium in the World Cup
- Italians most successful race winner in the World Cup
- Italy at the FIS Alpine World Ski Championships
