= Giuliano Giardini =

Italian alpine skier (born 1960)

Giuliano Giardini (born 1 January 1960) is a retired Italian alpine skier who competed in the 1980 Winter Olympics.
