= Lucia Recchia =

Italian alpine skier (born 1980)

Medal record

Women's Alpine Skiing

World Championships
Silver medal – second place	2005 Santa Catherina	Super G

Lucia Recchia (born 8 January 1980 in Rovereto, Trentino) is an Italian former Alpine skier.

== Personal life ==
In 2013, Recchia married the sports journalist Christoph Weiser.
