= Manfred Mölgg =

Italian alpine skier

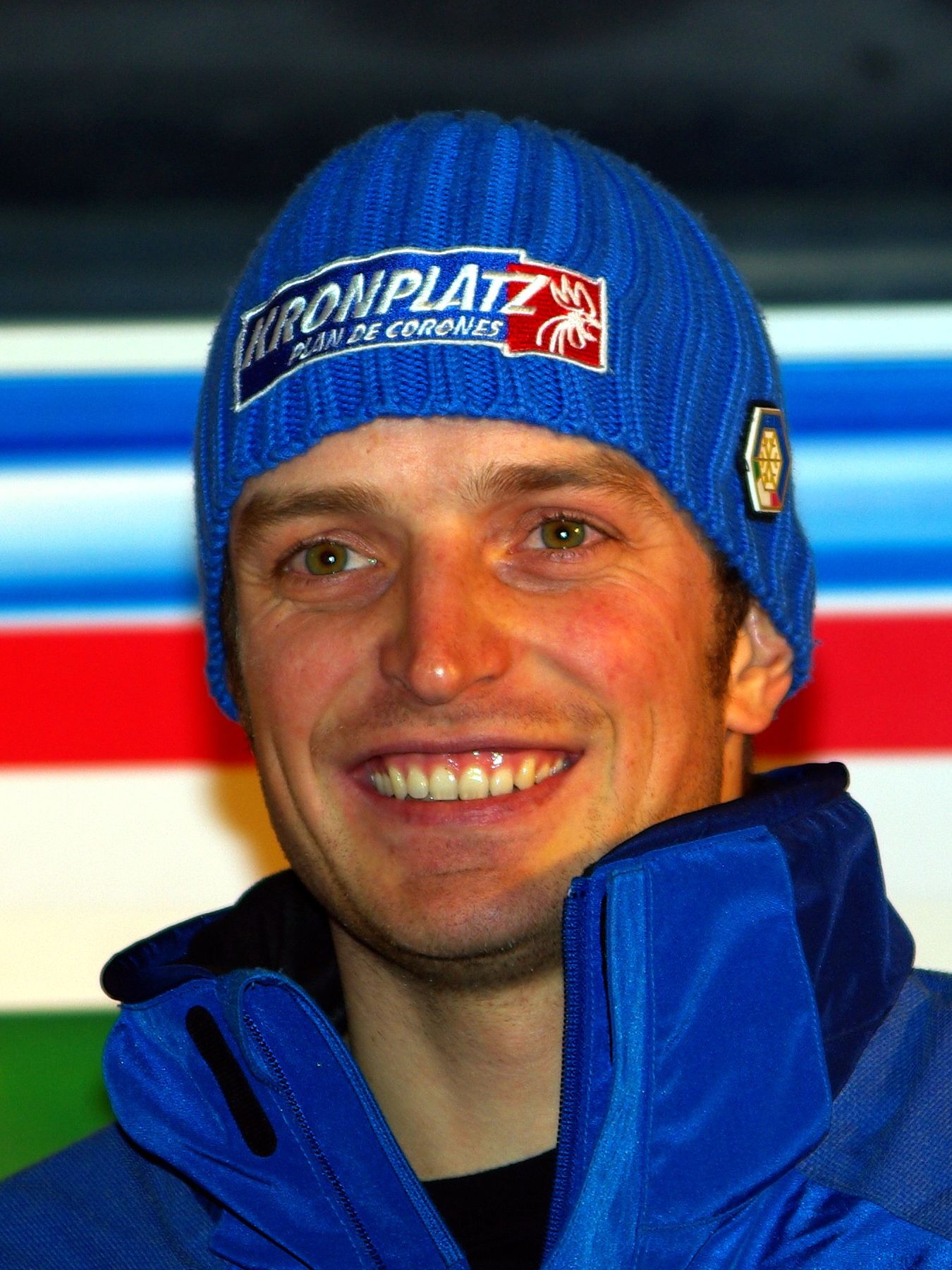
- January 2008

Personal information
- Born: 3 June 1982 (age 44) Bruneck, South Tyrol, Italy
- Height: 180 cm (5 ft 11 in)
- Website: moelgg.com

Skiing career
- Sport: Alpine skiing
- Club: G.S. Fiamme Gialle
- Retired: 9 March 2022 (age 39)
- Disciplines: Slalom, giant slalom
- World Cup debut: 12 January 2003 (age 20)

Olympics
- Teams: 4 – (2006–2018)
- Medals: 0

World Championships
- Teams: 9 – (2005–2021)
- Medals: 3 (0 gold)

World Cup
- Seasons: 20 – (2003–2022)
- Wins: 3 – (3 SL)
- Podiums: 20 – (3 GS, 16 SL, 1 SC)
- Overall titles: 0 – (4th in 2008)
- Discipline titles: 1 – (SL, 2008)
Medal record
International alpine ski competitions
Event	1st	2nd	3rd
World Championships	0	1	2
Total	0	1	2
World Championships
Silver medal – second place	2007 Åre	Slalom
Bronze medal – third place	2011 Garmisch-Partenkirchen	Slalom
Bronze medal – third place	2013 Schladming	Giant slalom
World Military Games
Gold medal – first place	2017 Sochi	Slalom team
Silver medal – second place	2017 Sochi	Slalom

Manfred Mölgg (born 3 June 1982) is an Italian former World Cup alpine ski racer. He specialized in the technical events of slalom and giant slalom.

Mölgg's younger sister Manuela is also a former alpine racer with ten World Cup podiums.

== Biography ==
Born in Bruneck, South Tyrol, Mölgg made his World Cup debut in January 2003 at Bormio. As of mid-January 2021, he has 20 World Cup podiums with three victories, all achieved in slalom. Mölgg won the World Cup season title in slalom in 2008, and finished fourth in the overall standings, the best result for an Italian since Kristian Ghedina finished fourth overall in 2000.

Mölgg has won three medals at the World Championships; a silver in slalom in 2007, a bronze in slalom in 2011, and a bronze in giant slalom in 2013.

On 11 January 2020 Mölgg suffered damage to his anterior cruciate ligament during a race at Adelboden, but returned to competition during the 2021 season.

== World Cup results ==
=== Season titles ===
Season	Discipline
2008	Slalom

=== Season standings ===
Season	Age	Overall	Slalom	Giant slalom	Super-G	Downhill	Combined
2004	21	27	9	23	—	—	—
2005	22	19	8	15	—	—	—
2006	23	56	28	25	—	—	—
2007	24	18	5	10	—	—	—
2008	25	4	1	3	35	—	51
2009	26	17	6	19	52	—	34
2010	27	14	12	13	36	—	13
2011	28	19	6	20	—	—	28
2012	29	41	26	20	—	—	—
2013	30	7	5	4	—	—	—
2014	31	17	10	16	—	—	—
2015	32	74	31	37	—	—	—
2016	33	33	17	23	—	—	—
2017	34	9	3	21	—	—	—
2018	35	21	10	15	—	—	—
2019	36	26	12	21	—	—	—
2020	37	72	22	39	—	—	—
2021	38	55	23	39	—	—	—
2022	39	103	37	—	—	—	—

Standings through 20 March 2022

=== Race podiums ===
- 3 wins – (3 SL)
- 20 podiums – (3 GS, 16 SL, 1 SC)

Season	Date	Location	Discipline	Place
2004	27 Jan 2004	Schladming, Austria	Slalom	2nd
2007	28 Jan 2007	Kitzbühel, Austria	Slalom	3rd
2007	4 Mar 2007	Kranjska Gora, Slovenia	Slalom	3rd
2007	18 Mar 2007	Lenzerheide, Switzerland	Slalom	3rd
2008	11 Nov 2007	Reiteralm, Austria	Slalom	3rd
2008	8 Dec 2007	Bad Kleinkirchheim, Austria	Giant slalom	2nd
2008	9 Dec 2007	Bad Kleinkirchheim, Austria	Slalom	3rd
2008	22 Jan 2008	Schladming, Austria	Slalom	3rd
2008	9 Feb 2008	Garmisch-Partenkirchen, Germany	Slalom	2nd
2008	8 Mar 2008	Kranjska Gora, Slovenia	Giant slalom	2nd
2008	9 Mar 2008	Kranjska Gora, Slovenia	Slalom	1st
2009	1 Feb 2009	Garmisch-Partenkirchen, Germany	Slalom	1st
2010	11 Dec 2009	Val-d'Isère, France	Super combined	3rd
2010	6 Jan 2010	Zagreb, Croatia	Slalom	2nd
2013	28 Oct 2012	Sölden, Austria	Giant slalom	2nd
2013	13 Jan 2013	Adelboden, Switzerland	Slalom	3rd
2014	6 Jan 2014	Bormio, Italy	Slalom	3rd
2017	13 Nov 2016	Levi, Finland	Slalom	3rd
2017	5 Jan 2017	Zagreb, Croatia	Slalom	1st
2017	8 Jan 2017	Adelboden, Switzerland	Slalom	2nd

== World Championship results ==
Year	Age	Slalom	Giant slalom	Super-G	Downhill	Combined
2005	22	DNF1	13	—	—	—
2007	24	2	19	—	—	—
2009	26	DNF2	12	—	—	—
2011	28	3	17	—	—	—
2013	30	DNF2	3	—	—	—
2015	32	11	—	—	—	—
2017	34	14	20	—	—	—
2019	36	18	DNS2	—	—	—
2021	38	14	—	—	—	—

== Olympic results ==
Year	Age	Slalom	Giant slalom	Super-G	Downhill	Combined
2006	23	DNF1	DNF1	—	—	—
2010	27	7	22	—	—	—
2014	31	DNF2	DNF2	—	—	—
2018	35	12	13	—	—	—

== See also ==
- Italian skiers who closed in top 10 in overall World Cup
