= Gustav Thöni =

Italian alpine skier (born 1951)

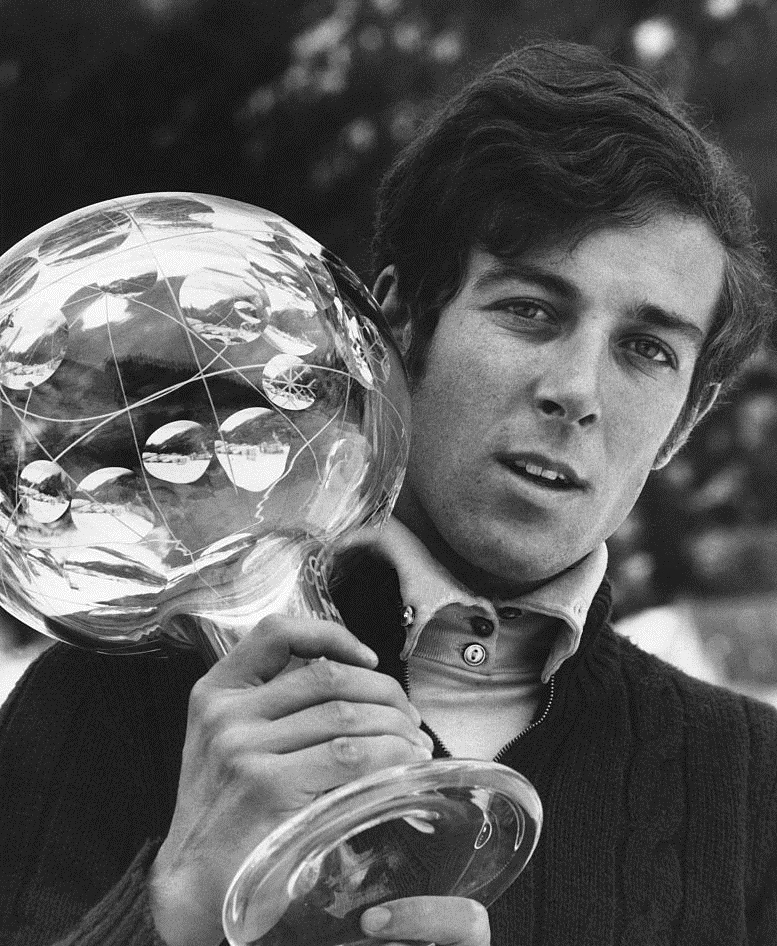
- Thöni in 1972

Personal information
- Born: 28 February 1951 (age 75) Trafoi, South Tyrol, Italy
- Height: 173 cm (5 ft 8 in)

Skiing career
- Sport: Alpine skiing
- Club: Fiamme Gialle
- Retired: March 1980 (age 29)
- Disciplines: Giant slalom, slalom, downhill, combined
- World Cup debut: 11 December 1969 (age 18)

Olympics
- Teams: 3 (1972, 1976, 1980)
- Medals: 3 (1 gold)

World Championships
- Teams: 6 (1970–80) (includes three Olympics)
- Medals: 7 (5 gold)

World Cup
- Seasons: 11 (1970–80)
- Wins: 24
- Podiums: 69
- Overall titles: 4 (1971–73, '75)
- Discipline titles: 5 (3 GS, 2 SL)
Medal record
World Cup race podiums
Event	1st	2nd	3rd
Slalom	8	15	9
Giant	11	7	8
Downhill	0	1	1
Combined	4	2	2
Parallel	1	0	0
Total	24	25	20
International alpine ski competitions
Event	1st	2nd	3rd
Olympic Games	1	2	0
World Championships	5	2	0
Total	6	4	0
Olympic Games
Gold medal – first place	1972 Sapporo	Giant slalom
Silver medal – second place	1972 Sapporo	Slalom
Silver medal – second place	1976 Innsbruck	Slalom
World Championships
Gold medal – first place	1972 Sapporo	Combined
Gold medal – first place	1972 Sapporo	Giant slalom
Silver medal – second place	1972 Sapporo	Slalom
Gold medal – first place	1974 St. Moritz	Giant slalom
Gold medal – first place	1974 St. Moritz	Slalom
Gold medal – first place	1976 Innsbruck	Combined
Silver medal – second place	1976 Innsbruck	Slalom

Gustav Thöni (Italian pronunciation: [ˈɡustav ˈtøːni; ˈteːni]; sometimes listed as Gustavo Thoeni; born 28 February 1951) is an Italian retired World Cup alpine ski racer.

== Career ==
Thöni was born in the German-speaking province of South Tyrol, in the hamlet of Trafoi of the Stilfs municipality, which is situated on the northern ramp of the Stelvio Pass. He currently operates a hotel there.

Ranked among the greatest Italian skiers ever, Thöni won three Olympic medals and a total of four overall World Cup titles in five years in the early 1970s. The four titles are an achievement he shares with Pirmin Zurbriggen and Hermann Maier, exceeded by Marcel Hirscher's eight and Marc Girardelli's five.

Thöni was the dominant skier in the technical events (slalom and giant slalom) in the early 1970s. At Val d'Isère, on 12 December 1968, was his World Cup debut. The 17-year-old placed 40th in the giant slalom (bib 110). His first victory came in the first race of the next season, a giant slalom at Val d'Isère, France, in December 1969. Still a teenager, he had a very successful rookie year during that 1970 season with four victories and nine podiums. He finished third in the overall standings, just eight points behind winner Karl Schranz of Austria. Thöni won the overall title the next three seasons of 1971–73, and again in 1975. He was succeeded as the dominant technical skier by Ingemar Stenmark of Sweden, then by Alberto Tomba.

The year that Thöni did not win (1974), he was a close second to his fellow countryman and friend Piero Gros. He did win two world titles that year, in giant slalom and slalom, at the 1974 World Championships, but those results were not included in the World Cup standings.

Although he concentrated on the technical events, he did occasionally compete in the only speed event of the era, the downhill (the Super-G was not run on the World Cup circuit until December 1982). His best finish in a downhill was a second place on the Hahnenkamm, Kitzbühel, Austria, in January 1975. After more than two minutes on the classic Streif course, he lost to the up-and-coming Austrian legend Franz Klammer by just one-hundredth of a second, a distance of about 25 cm (10 in) at 130 km/h (80 mph). This event inspired the 1981 movie Un centesimo di secondo by Duccio Tessari, which featured Thöni himself.

Thöni also won a number of combined events (downhill & slalom) during his career, including the non-medal titles in the combined at the Olympics in 1972 and 1976 (but counted as world championship titles).

Thöni's final victory in a slalom came in March 1975 at Sun Valley. He won the final race of the season, a parallel slalom ("pro-style" heats) the following week in Val Gardena, Italy, against his challenger Stenmark to secure the overall title. His last win in giant slalom was in January 1976, and his final World Cup victory was in the combined at Kitzbühel in January 1977. His last podium finish was a third place in the slalom at Åre, Sweden, in February 1979.

He finished eighth in the slalom at the 1980 Winter Olympics at Lake Placid. As the torch had been passed on to the two top finishers, Stenmark and American Phil Mahre, Thöni retired from World Cup competition a month later in March 1980 at the age of 29. Later, he was a personal coach to Alberto Tomba (1989–1996). In parallel, he was technical director of the men's national team, and then, until 1999, general manager of both male and female national teams.

Thöni was the Italian flag bearer at the opening ceremonies of the 1976 and 1980 Olympics and at the closing of the 2006 Winter Games in Torino. In 1973 and 1974 he was named "Skieur d’Or" by international ski journalists. He is mentioned in the song "Nuntereggae più" by Rino Gaetano. His cousin Roland Thöni was also a World Cup alpine ski racer in the 1970s. Roland took bronze in the slalom at the 1972 Olympics, while Gustav took the silver.

== World Cup results ==
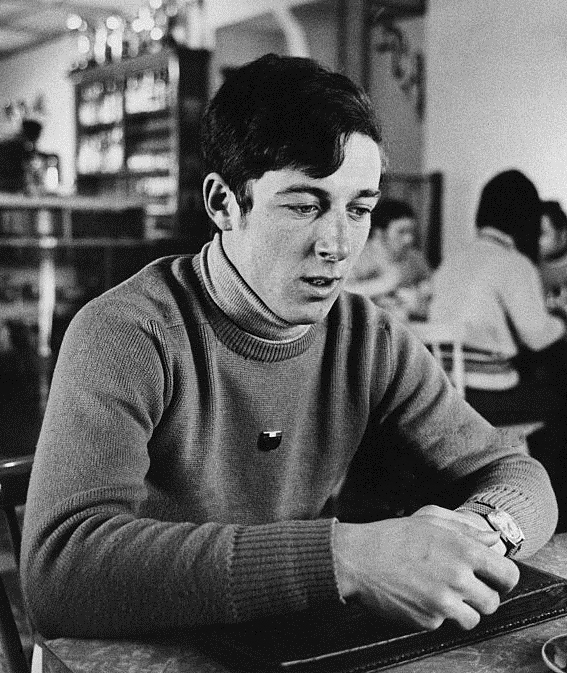
Thöni in 1970

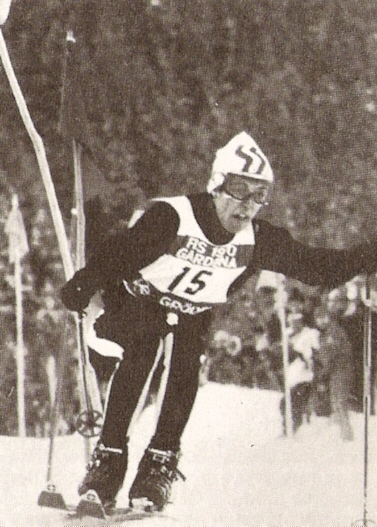
Thöni at age 18 in the slalom at the 1970 World Championships

=== Season titles ===
- 8 titles (4 overall, 2 giant slalom, 2 slalom)

Season	Discipline
1970	Giant slalom
1971	Overall
1972	Overall
1972	Giant slalom
1973	Overall
1973	Slalom
1974	Slalom
1975	Overall

=== Season standings ===
Season	Age	Overall	Slalom	Giant Slalom	Super G	Downhill	Combined
1970	19	3	4	1	not run	—	awarded only in 1976 & 1980
1971	20	1	2	2	not run	13	awarded only in 1976 & 1980
1972	21	1	4	1	not run	17	awarded only in 1976 & 1980
1973	22	1	1	4	not run	—	awarded only in 1976 & 1980
1974	23	2	1	3	not run	—	awarded only in 1976 & 1980
1975	24	1	3	4	not run	9	awarded only in 1976 & 1980
1976	25	3	3	2	not run	—	2
1977	26	6	5	10	not run	—	
1978	27	26	22	10	not run	23	
1979	28	9	9	20	not run	—	
1980	29	51	18	—	not run	—	—

=== Race victories ===
- 24 wins (11 GS, 8 SL, 4K, 1 PR)
  - 69 podiums (2 DH, 26 GS, 32 SL, 8 K, 1 PR)
    - 25 second places
    - 20 third places
- World Cup races (over 300 starts)

Season	Date	Location	Discipline
1970	11 Dec 1969	Val d'Isère, France	Giant slalom
1970	4 Jan 1970	Bad Hindelang, West Germany	Slalom
1970	29 Jan 1970	Madonna di Campiglio, Italy	Giant slalom
1970	30 Jan 1970	Madonna di Campiglio, Italy	Giant slalom
1971	10 Jan 1971	Madonna di Campiglio, Italy	Slalom
1971	21 Feb 1971	(United States) Sugarloaf, ME, USA	Giant slalom
1971	25 Feb 1971	(United States) Heavenly Valley, CA, USA	Slalom
1971	27 Feb 1971	(United States) Heavenly Valley, CA, USA	Giant slalom
1972	2 Mar 1972	(United States) Heavenly Valley, CA, USA	Giant slalom
1973	15 Jan 1973	Adelboden, Switzerland	Giant slalom
1973	4 Feb 1973	St. Anton, Austria	Slalom
1973	4 Mar 1973	Mont Ste. Anne, QC, Canada	Slalom
1974	20 Jan 1974	Adelboden, Switzerland	Giant slalom
1974	2 Mar 1974	Voss, Norway	Giant slalom
1974	10 Mar 1974	Vysoke Tatry, Czechoslovakia	Slalom
1975	12 Jan 1975	Wengen, Switzerland	Combined
1975	19 Jan 1975	Kitzbühel, Austria	Combined
1975	30 Jan 1975	Chamonix, France	Slalom
1975	1 Feb 1975	Megève, France	Combined
1975	15 Mar 1975	(United States) Sun Valley, ID, USA	Slalom
1975	23 Mar 1975	Val Gardena, Italy	Parallel
1976	5 Dec 1975	Val d'Isère, France	Giant slalom
1976	12 Jan 1976	Adelboden, Switzerland	Giant slalom
1977	16 Jan 1977	Wengen, Switzerland	Combined

== World championship results ==
Year	Age	Slalom	Giant Slalom	Super-G	Downhill	Combined
1970	18	4	DNF	not run	—	—
1972	20	2	1	not run	13	1
1974	22	1	1	not run	—	—
1976	24	2	4	not run	26	1
1978	26	DNF1	24	not run	12	—
1980	28	8	—	not run	—	—

From 1948 through 1980, the Winter Olympics were also the World Championships for alpine skiing.
At the World Championships from 1954 through 1980, the combined was a "paper race" using the results of the three events (DH, GS, SL).

== Olympic results ==
Year	Age	Slalom	Giant Slalom	Super-G	Downhill	Combined
1972	20	2	1	not run	13	not run
1976	24	2	4	not run	26	not run
1980	28	8	—	not run	—	not run

== See also ==
- Italian men gold medalist at the Olympics and World Championships
- Italy national alpine ski at the World championships
- Italian skiers most successful race winner

== Video ==
- Video – montage – Gustav Thöni on YouTube
- Video – 1972 Winter Olympics – Gustav Thöni on YouTube
- Video – Val Gardena, Italy – parallel slalom – Gustav Thöni & Ingemar Stenmark – 1975-03-23 on YouTube

Winter Olympics
Preceded by Luciano De Paolis	Flag bearer for Italy; 1976 Innsbruck	Succeeded by Gustav Thöni
Preceded by Gustav Thöni	Flag bearer for Italy; 1980 Lake Placid	Succeeded by Paul Hildgartner
