= Piero Gros =

Italian alpine skier (born 1954)

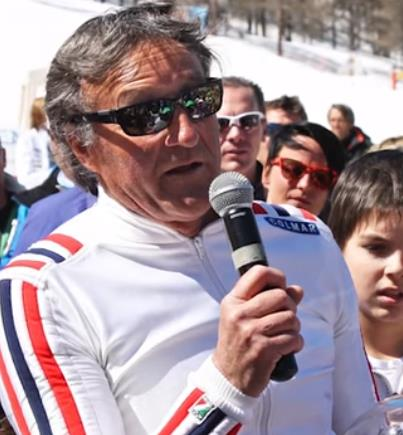
- Gros in 2014 at the age of 60.

Personal information
- Born: 30 October 1954 (age 71) Sauze d'Oulx, Italy
- Height: 1.80 m (5 ft 11 in)

Skiing career
- Sport: Alpine skiing
- Club: Sci Club Sauze D'Oulx, G.S. Fiamme Gialle
- Retired: 1982
- Disciplines: Technical events
- World Cup debut: 1973

Olympics
- Teams: 2
- Medals: 1 (1 gold)

World Championships
- Teams: 5
- Medals: 3 (1 gold)

World Cup
- Seasons: 10
- Wins: 12
- Podiums: 35
- Overall titles: 1
- Discipline titles: 2
Medal record
International alpine ski competitions
Event	1st	2nd	3rd
Olympic Games	1	0	0
World Championships	1	1	1
Total	2	1	1
World Cup race podiums
Event	1st	2nd	3rd
Slalom	7	6	4
Giant	5	7	4
Combined	0	1	1
Total	12	14	9
Olympic Games
Gold medal – first place	1976 Innsbruck	Slalom
World Championships
Silver medal – second place	1978 Garmisch	Slalom
Bronze medal – third place	1974 St. Moritz	Giant slalom

Piero "Pierino" Gros (born 30 October 1954) is a former World Cup alpine ski racer from northwestern Italy. He won the gold medal in slalom at the 1976 Winter Olympics in Innsbruck, and was the World Cup overall champion in 1974.

== Biography ==
Gros was born at Sauze d'Oulx, in the province of Turin in the Piedmont region. He learned to ski at an early age, thanks to Aldo Monaci and Aldo Zulian. At the age of 8, he was for the first time on the podium of a local race. Gros made his debut in the World Cup at age 18 in December 1972. In that 1973 season, he won two races in Val d'Isère and Madonna di Campiglio; he was the youngest Italian skier ever to win a World Cup race. Two years later he won the overall title, sharing this result in Italy only with his friend and rival Gustav Thöni and with Alberto Tomba. Thöni had won the overall title the three preceding seasons and would reclaim it in 1975; he was the runner-up in 1974, and if not for Gros, would've won an unthinkable five consecutive overall titles. Gros also won the bronze medal in the giant slalom at the 1974 World Championships in St. Moritz.

His most notable and best result was the gold medal in the slalom at the 1976 Winter Olympics: he preceded the silver medalist Thöni, in the most successful race ever for Italy at the Winter Olympics. According to Gros, that race was also significant in which he defeated the then almost unbeatable Ingemar Stenmark of Sweden, to which Gros had been second six times in that 1976 World Cup season. Gros won another world championship medal in 1978, taking silver in slalom. Stenmark's dominance was the major factor in Gros' limited success in the late 1970s.

During his career, Piero Gros won a total of 12 World Cup races; 7 in giant slalom and 5 in slalom. He had 35 World Cup podiums (top 3) and 98 top ten finishes. Gros retired from international competition following the 1982 season, at the age of 27.

In 1985–1990 he was mayor of his native village of Sauze d'Oulx. In the meantime he worked as sport commentator for various television stations, including RAI, the Italian State Network. He held various executive positions at the 1997 World Championships in Sestriere and was involved with the 2006 Winter Olympics as head of the volunteers and deputy mayor of the Olympic Village in Sestriere. He carried the Olympic torch at the Opening Ceremony.

His son Giorgio (b. 1981) is also a former alpine ski racer; he raced on the European Cup circuit until 2006 and competed in over twenty World Cup speed events.

== World Cup results ==
=== Season standings ===
Season	Age	Overall	Slalom	Giant slalom	Super G	Downhill	Combined
1973	18	10	6	4	not run	—	not awarded
1974	19	1	4	1	not run	—	not awarded
1975	20	4	2	2	not run	—	not awarded
1976	21	2	2	3	not run	—	6
1977	22	4	4	5	not run	—	not awarded
1978	23	8	4	9	not run	—	not awarded
1979	24	4	7	6	not run	—	not awarded
1980	25	29	18	24	not run	—	11
1981	26	28	8	—	not run	—	—
1982	27	50	15	—	not run	—	—

=== Season titles ===
Season	Discipline
1974	Overall
1974	Giant slalom

=== Individual races ===
- 12 wins – (7 GS, 5 SL)
- 35 podiums – (16 GS, 17, 2 K)

Season	Date	Location	Discipline
1973	8 December 1972	Val d'Isère, France	Giant slalom
1973	17 December 1972	Madonna di Campiglio, Italy	Slalom
1974	17 December 1973	Sterzing, Italy	Slalom
1974	7 January 1974	Berchtesgaden, West Germany	Giant slalom
1974	13 January 1974	Morzine, France	Giant slalom
1974	3 March 1974	Voss, Norway	Slalom
1974	9 March 1974	Vysoké Tatry, Czechoslovakia	Giant slalom
1975	5 December 1974	Val d'Isère, France	Giant slalom
1975	18 December 1974	Madonna di Campiglio, Italy	Giant slalom
1975	6 January 1975	Garmisch, West Germany	Slalom
1975	13 January 1975	Adelboden, Switzerland	Giant slalom
1975	19 January 1975	Kitzbühel, Austria	Slalom
