= Italy national alpine ski team =

Team representing Italy in international alpine skiing competitions

Italy
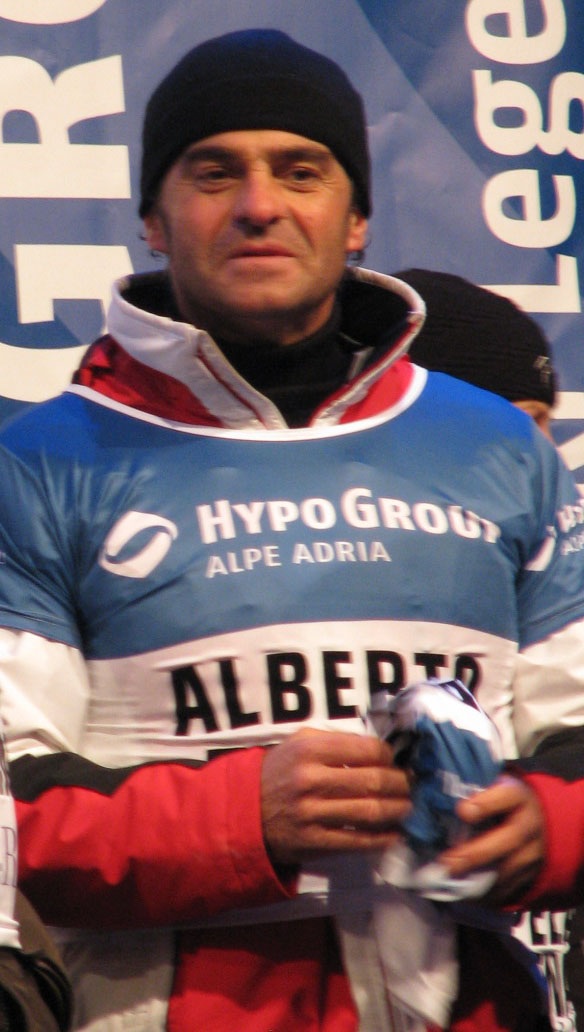
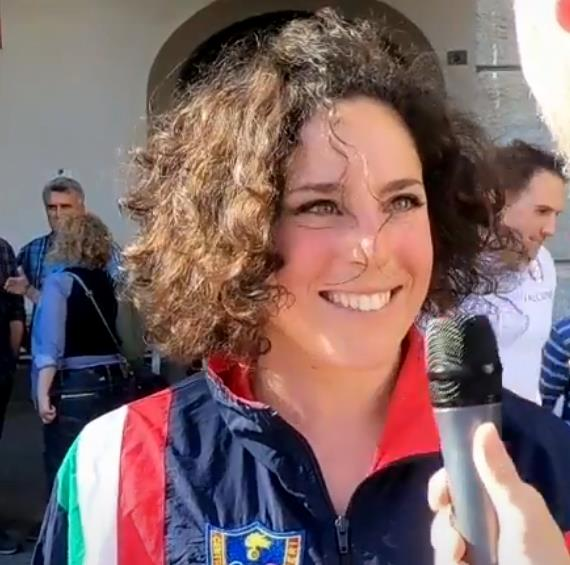
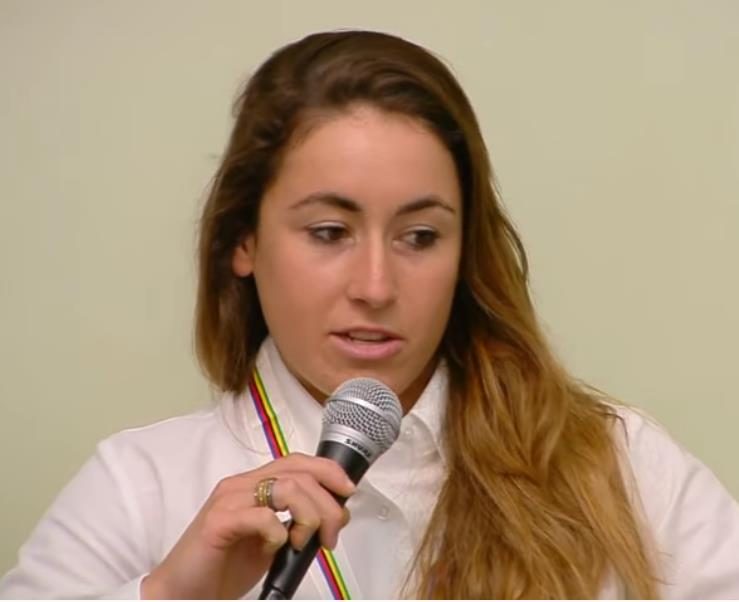
- Alberto Tomba, Federica Brignone and Sofia Goggia, the three highest champions of the azzurro alpine skiing.
- Coach: Massimo Rinaldi

Olympic Games
- Appearances: 23
- Medals: 41

World Championships
- Appearances: 45
- Medals: 80
Medal record
Alpine skiing
Event	1st	2nd	3rd
Winter Olympics	16	12	13
World Championships	26	27	27
Total	42	39	40

The Italy national alpine ski team represents Italy in international alpine skiing competitions such as Winter Olympic Games, FIS Alpine Ski World Cup and FIS Alpine World Ski Championships.

== World Cup ==
Italian alpine skiers won eight overall FIS Alpine Ski World Cup, six men and two women.

=== Titles ===
==== Men ====
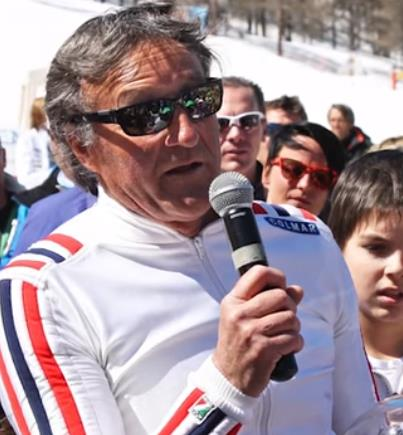
Piero Gros, overall Cup winner in 1974.

Still active

Skier	Overall	Downhill	Super G	Giant	Slalom	Combined	Total
Gustav Thöni	4	-	-	3	2	-	9
Alberto Tomba	1	-	-	4	4	-	9
Piero Gros	1	-	-	1	-	-	2
Peter Fill	-	2	-	-	-	1	3
Manfred Mölgg	-	-	-	-	1	-	1
Giorgio Rocca	-	-	-	-	1	-	1
Peter Runggaldier	-	-	1	-	-	-	1
Dominik Paris	-	-	1	-	-	-	1
	6	2	2	8	8	1	27

==== Women ====
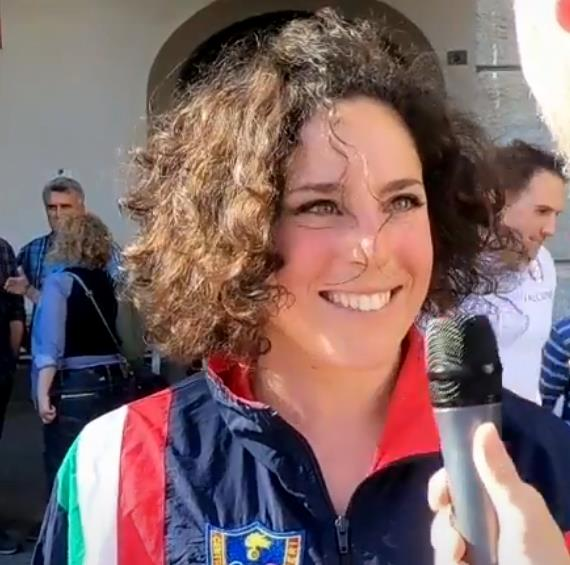
Federica Brignone is the only Italian female skier to won the overall Cup.

Still active

Skier	Overall	Downhill	Super G	Giant	Slalom	Combined	Total
Federica Brignone	2	1	1	2	-	1	7
Sofia Goggia	-	4	1	-	-	-	5
Isolde Kostner	-	2	-	-	-	-	2
Deborah Compagnoni	-	-	-	1	-	-	1
Denise Karbon	-	-	-	1	-	-	1
Marta Bassino	-	-	-	1	-	-	1
Laura Pirovano	-	1	-	-	-	-	1
	2	8	2	5	0	1	18

=== Race winner ===
==== Men ====
Still active

Updated to 22 March 2026

Skier	Seasons	Wins	DH	SG	GS	SL	KB	PSL
Alberto Tomba	11 (1988–1998)	50	-	–	15	35	–	-
Dominik Paris	14 (2013–2026)	26	20	6	–	–	–	–
Gustav Thöni	8 (1970–1977)	24	–	NA	11	8	4	1
Kristian Ghedina	7 (1990–2002)	13	12	1	–	–	–	–
Piero Gros	3 (1973–1975)	12	–	–	7	5	–	–
Giorgio Rocca	4 (2003–2006)	11	–	–	–	11	–	–
Massimiliano Blardone	6 (2005–2012)	7	–	–	7	–	–	–
Christof Innerhofer	4 (2009–2013)	6	4	1	–	–	1	–
Herbert Plank	4 (1974–1980)	5	5	–	–	–	–	–
Richard Pramotton	2 (1986–1987)	3	–	–	3	–	–	–
Michael Mair	3 (1983–1988)	3	2	1	–	–	–	–
Werner Heel	2 (2008–2009)	3	1	2	–	–	–	–
Manfred Mölgg	3 (2008–2017)	3	–	–	–	3	–	–
Peter Fill	3 (2009–2017)	3	2	1	–	–	-	–
Roland Thöni	1 (1972)	2	–	NA	–	2	–	–
Fausto Radici	2 (1976–1977)	2	–	–	–	2	–	–
Werner Perathoner	2 (1995–1996)	2	–	2	–	–	–	–
Peter Runggaldier	2 (1995–1996)	2	–	2	–	–	–	–
Patrick Holzer	2 (1992–1999)	2	–	1	1	–	–	–
Alessandro Fattori	2 (2001–2002)	2	1	1	–	–	–	–
Davide Simoncelli	2 (2004–2006)	2	–	–	2	–	–	–
Giuliano Razzoli	2 (2010–2011)	2	–	–	–	2	–	–
Giovanni Franzoni	2 (2026)	2	1	1	–	–	–	–
Stefano Anzi	1 (1971)	1	1	NA	–	–	NA	NA
Franco Bieler	1 (1976)	1	–	NA	1	–	–	–
Leonardo David	1 (1979)	1	–	NA	–	1	–	–
Robert Erlacher	1 (1985)	1	–	–	1	–	–	–
Ivano Edalini	1 (1987)	1	–	–	–	1	–	–
Sergio Bergamelli	1 (1992)	1	–	–	1	–	–	–
Fabrizio Tescari	1 (1993)	1	–	–	–	1	–	–
Angelo Weiss	1 (2000)	1	–	–	–	1	–	–
Cristian Deville	1 (2012)	1	–	–	–	1	–	–
Matteo Marsaglia	1 (2013)	1	–	1	–	–	–	–
Stefano Gross	1 (2015)	1	–	–	–	1	–	–
Mattia Casse	1 (2025)	1	–	1	–	–	–	–

NA - Disciplines didn't exist yet

==== Women ====
Still active

Updated to 22 March 2026

Skier	First & last	Wins	DH	SG	GS	SL	KB	PSL
Federica Brignone	10 (2016–2025)	37	2	13	17	–	5	–
Sofia Goggia	10 (2017–2026)	29	19	10	–	–	–	–
Deborah Compagnoni	7 (1992–1998)	16	–	2	13	1	–	–
Isolde Kostner	11 (1994–2004)	15	12	3	–	–	–	–
Karen Putzer	10 (1998–2007)	8	–	4	4	–	–	–
Marta Bassino	5 (2020-2024)	7	1	–	6	–	–	–
Denise Karbon	5 (2004–2008)	6	–	–	6	–	–	–
Ninna Quario	6 (1979–1984)	4	–	–	–	4	–	–
Elena Curtoni	7 (2020-2026)	4	2	2	–	-	–	–
Claudia Giordani	7 (1974–1980)	3	–	NA	1	2	–	–
Sabina Panzanini	3 (1995–1997)	3	–	–	3	–	–	–
Laura Pirovano	1 (2026)	3	3	–	–	-	–	–
Daniela Zini	5 (1980–1984)	2	–	–	–	2	–	–
Elena Fanchini	10 (2006–2015)	2	2	–	–	–	–	–
Nadia Fanchini	8 (2009–2016)	2	1	1	–	–	–	–
Giustina Demetz	1 (1967)	1	1	NA	–	–	NA	NA
Paoletta Magoni	1 (1985)	1	–	–	–	1	–	–
Michaela Marzola	1 (1986)	1	–	1	–	–	–	–
Lara Magoni	1 (1997)	1	–	–	–	1	–	–
Bibiana Perez	1 (1993)	1	–	–	–	–	1	–
Daniela Merighetti	1 (2012)	1	1	–	–	–	–	–
Chiara Costazza	1 (2008)	1	–	–	–	1	–	–
Nicol Delago	1 (2026)	1	1	–	–	-	–	–

NA - Disciplines didn't exist yet

=== Podiums ===
Updated to 31 January 2023, individual podium Italian skiers, and podiums per nations.

Still active

==== Men ====
#	Skier	1st	2nd	3rd	Total
1	Alberto Tomba	50	26	12	88
2	Gustav Thöni	24	25	20	69
3	Dominik Paris	26	12	16	54
4	Piero Gros	12	14	9	35
5	Kristian Ghedina	13	11	9	33
6	Max Blardone	7	12	6	25
7	Giorgio Rocca	11	7	4	22
8	Peter Fill	3	10	9	22
9	Herbert Plank	5	10	6	21
10	Manfred Mölgg	3	7	10	20
11	Michael Mair	3	7	6	16
12	Christof Innerhofer	6	7	5	18

==== Women ====
#	Skier	1st	2nd	3rd	Total
1	Federica Brignone	37	27	21	85
2	Sofia Goggia	29	24	16	69
3	Isolde Kostner	15	18	18	51
4	Deborah Compagnoni	16	15	13	44
5	Marta Bassino	7	9	14	30
6	Claudia Giordani	3	8	6	17
7	Karen Putzer	8	5	3	16
8	Denise Karbon	6	4	6	16
9	Ninna Quario	4	6	5	15
10	Manuela Mölgg	0	6	8	14
11	Elena Curtoni	4	5	4	13
12	Nadia Fanchini	2	3	8	13

==== Team ====
Total uploaded at the end of the World Cup 2022. Team podiums (0, 1, 1) are excluded.

Best result

Season	Men				Women				Total			
Season	Gold medal	Silver medal	Bronze medal	Tot.	Gold medal	Silver medal	Bronze medal	Tot.	Gold medal	Silver medal	Bronze medal	Tot.
1967	0	0	0	0	1	0	0	1	1	0	0	1
1968	0	0	0	0	0	0	0	0	0	0	0	0
1969	0	0	0	0	0	0	0	0	0	0	0	0
1970	4	4	1	9	0	0	0	0	4	4	1	9
1971	5	4	5	14	0	0	0	0	5	4	5	14
1972	3	4	4	11	0	0	0	0	3	4	4	11
1973	5	6	6	17	0	1	0	1	5	7	6	18
1974	9	8	6	23	1	0	0	1	10	8	6	24
1975	11	9	8	28	0	1	1	2	11	10	9	30
1976	5	9	10	24	0	1	1	2	5	10	11	26
1977	2	9	5	16	1	1	2	4	3	10	7	20
1978	2	2	5	9	0	0	0	0	2	2	5	9
1979	1	2	6	9	1	2	2	5	2	4	8	14
1980	1	2	1	4	2	1	4	7	3	3	5	11
1981	0	1	1	2	0	4	4	8	0	5	5	10
1982	0	0	4	4	0	3	1	4	0	3	5	8
1983	1	2	1	4	2	1	0	3	3	3	1	7
1984	0	2	4	6	2	1	2	5	2	3	6	11
1985	1	3	4	8	1	2	3	6	2	5	7	14
1986	3	6	3	12	1	1	1	3	4	7	4	15
1987	3	7	7	17	0	0	0	0	3	7	7	17
1988	10	4	4	18	0	0	0	0	10	4	4	18
1989	1	4	4	9	0	0	0	0	1	4	4	9
1990	5	2	5	12	0	0	0	0	5	2	5	12
1991	6	4	2	12	0	0	0	0	6	4	2	12
1992	11	4	4	19	1	5	0	6	12	9	4	25
1993	2	10	3	15	2	3	5	10	4	13	8	25
1994	4	6	4	14	4	5	4	13	8	11	8	27
1995	15	4	3	22	2	6	5	13	17	10	8	35
1996	5	2	8	15	2	5	6	13	7	7	14	28
1997	4	6	8	18	10	5	5	20	14	11	13	38
1998	4	2	1	7	5	3	7	15	9	5	8	22
1999	2	2	2	6	0	4	3	7	2	6	5	13
2000	3	4	2	9	5	3	3	11	8	7	5	20
2001	1	1	1	3	3	5	0	8	4	6	1	11
2002	2	4	4	10	3	4	4	11	5	8	8	21
2003	2	3	1	6	5	3	5	13	7	6	6	19
2004	2	6	3	11	2	2	2	6	4	8	5	17
2005	4	3	0	7	0	4	1	5	4	7	1	12
2006	7	5	2	14	1	0	0	1	8	5	2	15
2007	1	4	7	12	1	1	2	4	2	5	9	16
2008	3	3	5	11	6	2	6	14	9	5	11	25
2009	5	5	5	15	1	6	3	10	6	11	8	25
2010	2	5	5	12	0	2	3	5	2	7	8	17
2011	2	1	3	6	0	2	2	4	2	3	5	10
2012	4	5	5	14	1	3	3	7	5	8	8	21
2013	6	2	5	13	0	1	0	1	6	3	5	14
2014	1	1	5	7	0	0	2	2	1	1	7	9
2015	2	6	4	12	1	1	2	4	3	7	6	16
2016	3	5	6	14	3	0	7	10	6	5	13	24
2017	4	8	6	18	5	9	11	25	9	17	17	43
2018	1	3	1	5	6	7	8	21	7	10	9	26
2019	7	3	3	13	3	4	1	8	10	7	4	21
2020	2	3	2	7	8	11	4	23	10	14	6	30
2021	1	0	2	3	9	4	4	17	10	4	6	20
2022	2	1	2	5	11	5	4	20	13	6	6	25
2023	0	2	3	5	8	12	6	26	8	14	9	31
2024	1	2	3	6	9	6	8	23	10	8	11	29
2025	3	1	2	6	12	5	7	24	15	6	9	30
2026	4	3	4	11	8	1	4	13	12	4	8	24
	200	219	220	639	149	158	158	465	349	377	378	1104

=== Closed in the top ten in overall ===
The Italian alpine skiers finished 58 times men (15 times on podium) and 43 times women (5 times on podium), on top ten in overall at the FIS Alpine Ski World Cup.

Still active

==== Men ====
Skier	1st	2nd	3rd	4th	5th	6th	7th	8th	9th	10th
Gustav Thöni	1971; 1972; 1973; 1975	1974	1970; 1976	-	-	1977	-	-	1979	-
Alberto Tomba	1995	1988; 1991; 1992	1989; 1994	-	1993; 1996	-	-	-	1990	-
Piero Gros	1974	1976	-	1975; 1977; 1979	-	-	-	1978	-	1973
Kristian Ghedina	-	-	-	1997; 2000	-	-	1995	-	-	2002
Dominik Paris	-	-	-	2019	-	2016	2015	2017; 2022; 2024	2026	-
Manfred Mölgg	-	-	-	2008	-	-	2013	-	2017	-
Herbert Plank	-	-	-	-	1978	-	1975; 1976	1980	1974	-
Richard Pramotton	-	-	-	-	1987	-	-	-	-	-
Peter Fill	-	-	-	-	-	2007; 2017	-	-	-	2009; 2016
Erwin Stricker	-	-	-	-	-	1974	-	-	-	-
Roland Thöni	-	-	-	-	-	-	1972	-	-	-
Christof Innerhofer	-	-	-	-	-	-	-	2011	-	2013
Robert Erlacher	-	-	-	-	-	-	-	1987	-	-
Alex Giorgi	-	-	-	-	-	-	-	-	1984	-
Paolo De Chiesa	-	-	-	-	-	-	-	-	-	1975
Mauro Bernardi	-	-	-	-	-	-	-	-	-	1978
Michael Mair	-	-	-	-	-	-	-	-	-	1988
Giovanni Franzoni	-	-	-	-	-	-	-	-	-	2026
Total (58)	6	5	4	7	4	5	6	6	6	9

==== Women ====
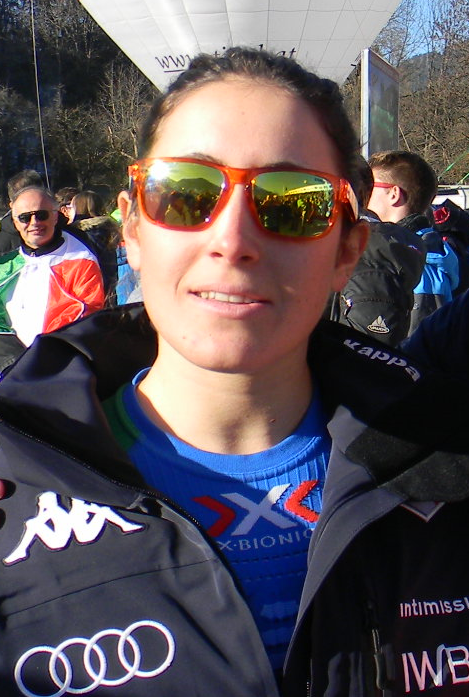
Sofia Goggia, four downhill world cup won.

Skier	1st	2nd	3rd	4th	5th	6th	7th	8th	9th	10th
Federica Brignone	2020; 2025	2024	2022	2023	2017	2019	2021	2016	-	-
Karen Putzer	-	2003	-	-	-	-	-	-	-	-
Sofia Goggia	-	-	2017; 2025	2018; 2026	2023	2022	2024	-	2021	-
Isolde Kostner	-	-	-	1996; 2000	1997	2001; 2002	-	1998	-	-
Deborah Compagnoni	-	-	-	1997; 1998	-	1994	-	-	-	-
Marta Bassino	-	-	-	-	2020	2021	-	2023	2024	2022
Claudia Giordani	-	-	-	-	-	-	-	1977; 1980	-	1979
Laura Pirovano	-	-	-	-	-	-	2026	-	-	-
Bibiana Perez	-	-	-	-	-	-	-	1994	-	-
Giustina Demetz	-	-	-	-	-	-	-	-	1967	-
Daniela Zini	-	-	-	-	-	-	-	-	1980	
Nadia Fanchini	-	-	-	-	-	-	-	-	2009	-
Elena Curtoni	-	-	-	-	-	-	-	-	2023	-
Ninna Quario	-	-	-	-	-	-	-	-	-	1982
Denise Karbon	-	-	-	-	-	-	-	-	-	2008
Total (43)	2	2	3	7	4	6	3	6	6	4

=== Closed in the podium on discipline standings (Men) ===
==== Men's slalom ====
Skier	1st	2nd	3rd
Alberto Tomba	1988; 1992; 1994; 1995	1989; 1990; 1993; 1996	-
Gustav Thöni	1973; 1974	1971; 1975	1976
Giorgio Rocca	2006	-	-
Manfred Mölgg	2008	-	2017
Pierino Gros	-	1976	1975
Roland Thöni	-	-	1972
	8	7	4

==== Men's giant slalom ====
Skier	1st	2nd	3rd
Alberto Tomba	1988; 1991; 1992; 1995	1993	-
Gustav Thöni	1970; 1971; 1972	1976	1974
Pierino Gros	1974	1975	1976
Max Blardone	-	2006; 2007	2004; 2012
Richard Pramotton	-	-	1987
Manfred Mölgg	-	-	2008
	8	5	6

==== Men's downhill ====
Skier	1st	2nd	3rd
Peter Fill	2016; 2017	-	-
Kristian Ghedina	-	1995; 1997; 2000	2002
Dominik Paris	-	2019	2013; 2016; 2017; 2021; 2022; 2024; 2026
Herbert Plank	-	1976	1974; 1975; 1978; 1980
Michael Mair	-	1988	1986
Marcello Varallo	-	-	1973
Werner Heel	-	-	2010
	2	6	15

==== Men's Super-G ====
Skier	1st	2nd	3rd
Dominik Paris	2019	2015	-
Peter Runggaldier	1995	-	-
Werner Heel	-	2009	-
Matteo Marsaglia	-	2013	-
Werner Perathoner	-	-	1995
	2	3	1

==== Men's combined ====
Skier	1st	2nd	3rd
Peter Fill	2018	-	-
Gustav Thöni	-	1976	-
Christof Innerhofer	-	2011	-
Alessandro Fattori	-	-	1996
	1	2	1

=== Closed in the podium on discipline standings (Women) ===
==== Women's slalom ====
Skier	1st	2nd	3rd
Claudia Giordani	-	-	1977
Daniela Zini	-	-	1981
Maria Rosa Quario	-	-	1983
Deborah Compagnoni	-	-	1997
	0	0	4

==== Women's giant slalom ====
Skier	1st	2nd	3rd
Federica Brignone	2020; 2025	2024	-
Deborah Compagnoni	1997	1998	1994
Denise Karbon	2008	2004	-
Marta Bassino	2021	-	2023
Karen Putzer	-	2003	-
Manuela Mölgg	-	-	2008
Sofia Goggia	-	-	2017
	5	4	4

==== Women's downhill ====
Skier	1st	2nd	3rd
Sofia Goggia	2018; 2021; 2022; 2023	2017	2024; 2025
Isolde Kostner	2001; 2002	-	1996; 1998; 2000
Federica Brignone	2025	-	2020
Laura Pirovano	2026	-	-
Giustina Demetz	-	-	1967
	8	1	7

==== Women's Super-G ====
Skier	1st	2nd	3rd
Federica Brignone	2022	2020; 2021; 2023; 2024; 2025	-
Sofia Goggia	2026	-	2025
Bibiana Perez	-	1994	-
Nadia Fanchini	-	2009	-
Elena Curtoni	-	2022	-
Michaela Marzola	-	-	1986
Isolde Kostner	-	-	1998
Karen Putzer	-	-	2003
	2	8	4

==== Women's combined ====
Skier	1st	2nd	3rd
Federica Brignone	2019; 2020	2017	2018
Bibiana Perez	-	1994	-
Morena Gallizio	-	-	1993
	2	2	2

==== Women's parallel ====
Skier	1st	2nd	3rd
Federica Brignone	-	-	2020
	0	0	1

=== Closed in the podium on Nations Cup ===
==== Overall ====
Nation	1st	2nd	3rd
Italy	-	1974; 1975; 1997; 2000; 2004; 2012; 2013; 2015; 2016; 2017	1976; 1977; 1979; 1994; 1995; 1996; 1998; 2002; 2003; 2005; 2006; 2008; 2009; 2010; 2011; 2014; 2018; 2020; 2021; 2022; 2024; 2025; 2026
	0	10	23

==== Men ====
Nation	1st	2nd	3rd
Italy	1974; 1975; 1976	1973; 1978; 1995; 1997; 2004; 2013	1972; 1977; 1979; 1985; 1986; 1987; 1988; 1990; 1992; 1996; 2005; 2006; 2007; 2008; 2009; 2010; 2011; 2012; 2014; 2015
	3	6	20

==== Women ====
Nation	1st	2nd	3rd
Italy	2017; 2020; 2025	2003; 2016; 2023	1997; 1998; 2000; 2002; 2008; 2012; 2015; 2018; 2019; 2021; 2022; 2024; 2026
	3	3	13

== World championships ==
From 1948 to 1980 (9 times) the Olympic titles was also world titles. Updated to Salbaach 2025 (only individual events).

Women

Skier	Slalom			Giant			Downhill			Super-G			Combined			Parallel			Total		
	1st place, gold medalist(s)	2nd place, silver medalist(s)	3rd place, bronze medalist(s)	1st place, gold medalist(s)	2nd place, silver medalist(s)	3rd place, bronze medalist(s)	1st place, gold medalist(s)	2nd place, silver medalist(s)	3rd place, bronze medalist(s)	1st place, gold medalist(s)	2nd place, silver medalist(s)	3rd place, bronze medalist(s)	1st place, gold medalist(s)	2nd place, silver medalist(s)	3rd place, bronze medalist(s)	1st place, gold medalist(s)	2nd place, silver medalist(s)	3rd place, bronze medalist(s)	1st place, gold medalist(s)	2nd place, silver medalist(s)	3rd place, bronze medalist(s)
Gustav Thöni	1	2	0	2	0	0							2	0	0				5	2	0
Zeno Colò	0	1	0	1	0	0	2	0	0										3	1	0
Deborah Compagnoni	1	0	0	2	0	0				0	0	0							3	0	0
Federica Brignone	0	0	0	1	2	0	0	0	0	0	1	0	1	0	0	0	0	0	2	3	0
Isolde Kostner							0	0	0	2	1	0							2	1	0
Alberto Tomba	1	0	1	1	0	1													2	0	2
Marta Bassino				0	0	0				1	0	0	0	0	0	1	0	0	2	0	0
Piero Gros	1	1	0	0	0	1													1	1	1
Christof Innerhofer							0	0	1	1	0	0	0	1	0				1	1	1
Dominik Paris							0	1	0	1	0	0	0	0	0				1	1	0
Paula Wiesinger	0	0	0	0	0	0	1	0	0										1	0	0
Carlo Senoner	1	0	0	0	0	0													1	0	0
Patrick Staudacher							0	0	0	1	0	0	0	0	0				1	0	0
Kristian Ghedina							0	1	1	0	0	0	0	1	0				0	2	1
Giacinto Sertorelli							0	2	0				0	0	0				0	2	0
Manfred Mölgg	0	1	1	0	0	1													0	1	2
Sofia Goggia				0	0	1	0	0	0	0	1	0	0	0	0				0	1	1
Karen Putzer				0	1	0				0	0	0	0	0	1				0	1	1
Denise Karbon	0	0	0	0	1	1													0	1	1
Nadia Fanchini							0	1	1	0	0	0							0	1	1
Peter Fill							0	0	0	0	1	0	0	0	1				0	1	1
Pia Riva							0	1	0										0	1	0
Claudia Giordani	0	1	0																0	1	0
Peter Runggaldier							0	1	0	0	0	0	0	0	0				0	1	0
Lara Magoni	0	1	0																0	1	0
Lucia Recchia							0	0	0	0	1	0							0	1	0
Elena Fanchini							0	1	0	0	0	0							0	1	0
Luca De Aliprandini				0	1	0										0	0	0	0	1	0
Giuliana Minuzzo	0	0	0	0	0	1	0	0	1				0	0	1				0	0	3
Giorgio Rocca	0	0	2										0	0	1				0	0	3
Alex Vinatzer	0	0	1	0	0	0													0	0	1
Ido Cattaneo	0	0	0				0	0	1				0	0	0				0	0	1
Celina Seghi	0	0	1				0	0	0				0	0	0				0	0	1
Herbert Plank							0	0	1										0	0	1
Carla Marchelli							0	0	1										0	0	1
Roland Thöni	0	0	1	0	0	0													0	0	1
Daniela Zini	0	0	1																0	0	1
Paoletta Magoni	0	0	1																0	0	1
	5	7	9	7	5	6	3	8	7	6	5	0	3	2	4	1	0	0	25	27	26

The 1941 World Championships results cancelled by the FIS in 1946 due to the limited number of participants during wartime. Italy had won the following seven medals.

Skier	Slalom			Giant			Downhill			Super-G			Combined			Total		
	1st place, gold medalist(s)	2nd place, silver medalist(s)	3rd place, bronze medalist(s)	1st place, gold medalist(s)	2nd place, silver medalist(s)	3rd place, bronze medalist(s)	1st place, gold medalist(s)	2nd place, silver medalist(s)	3rd place, bronze medalist(s)	1st place, gold medalist(s)	2nd place, silver medalist(s)	3rd place, bronze medalist(s)	1st place, gold medalist(s)	2nd place, silver medalist(s)	3rd place, bronze medalist(s)	1st place, gold medalist(s)	2nd place, silver medalist(s)	3rd place, bronze medalist(s)
Celina Seghi	1	0	0				0	0	0				0	1	0	1	1	0
Alberto Marcellin	0	0	1				0	1	0				0	1	0	0	2	1
Vittorio Chierroni	0	1	0				0	0	0				0	0	1	0	1	1

== Olympic Games ==
From 1948 to 1980 (9 times) the Olympic titles was also World titles. Updated to 6 March 2022.

Skier	Olympics	Gold	Silver	Bronze	Total
Alberto Tomba	1988–1994	3	2	0	5
Deborah Compagnoni	1992–1998	3	1	0	4
Federica Brignone	2018-2026	2	1	2	5
Gustav Thöni	1972-1976	1	2	0	3
Sofia Goggia	2018-2026	1	1	1	3
Zeno Colò	1952	1	0	0	1
Piero Gros	1976	1	0	0	1
Paoletta Magoni	1984	1	0	0	1
Josef Polig	1992	1	0	0	1
Daniela Ceccarelli	2002	1	0	0	1
Giuliano Razzoli	2010	1	0	0	1
Isolde Kostner	1994-2002	0	1	2	3
Christof Innerhofer	2014	0	1	1	2
Claudia Giordani	1976	0	1	0	1
Gianfranco Martin	1992	0	1	0	1
Giovanni Franzoni	2026	0	1	0	1
Giuliana Minuzzo	1952-1960	0	0	2	2
Roland Thöni	1972	0	0	1	1
Herbert Plank	1976	0	0	1	1
Karen Putzer	2002	0	0	1	1
Nadia Delago	2022	0	0	1	1
Dominik Paris	2026	0	0	1	1
		16	12	13	41

== See also ==
- Italy at the Winter Olympics
- Italy at the FIS Alpine World Ski Championships
- Italian Winter Sports Federation
- Italian Alpine Ski Championships
