= Italian Winter Sports Federation =

Sport governing body

Federazione italiana sport invernali
- Jurisdiction: Italy
- Abbreviation: FISI
- Founded: 1908
- Headquarters: Milan
- Location: Italy
- President: Flavio Roda

Official website
- www.fisi.org

The Italian Winter Sports Federation (Italian: Federazione Italiana Sport Invernali; FISI), is the winter sports federation for Italy. Part of the Italian National Olympic Committee (CONI), it deals with all federations conducting sports for the Winter Olympics, including skiing, snowboarding, biathlon, bobsleigh, and luge.

== History ==
Founded in Turin in 1908 as L'Unione Ski Clubs Italiani (Italian Union of Ski Clubs), the organization was disbanded in 1910. Three years later, a second organization called Federazione Dello Ski (Ski Federation) was formed in Milan which lasted until 1918. In 1920, a third organization called Federazione Italiana Dello Sci (Italian Ski Federation) was formed also in Milan. This consisted of the Nordic skiing disciplines (cross-country skiing, Nordic combined, and ski jumping) allowed in 1908 though bobsleigh (and skeleton) would be included in 1930 and alpine skiing the following year. The sports federation participated in the first Winter Olympics at Chamonix, France in 1924. Because of the inclusion of bobsleigh, the Italian Ski Federation changed their name to FISI in 1934. Luge would be included in 1966.

FISI is headquartered in Milan.

== See also ==
- Italy national alpine ski team
- Italy at the FIS Alpine World Ski Championships
