= 1932 in sports =

1932 in sports describes the year's events in world sport.

== Alpine skiing ==
FIS Alpine World Ski Championships

2nd FIS Alpine World Ski Championships are held at Cortina d'Ampezzo, Italy. The events are a downhill, a slalom and a combined race in both the men's and women's categories. The winners are:

- Men's Downhill – Gustav Lantschner (Austria)
- Men's Slalom – Friedl Däuber (Germany)
- Men's Combined – Otto Furrer (Switzerland)
- Women's downhill – Paula Wiesinger (Italy)
- Women's Slalom – Rösli Streiff (Switzerland)
- Women's Combined – Rösli Streiff (Switzerland)

== American football ==
- 1932 NFL Playoff Game: the Chicago Bears won 9–0 over the Portsmouth Spartans (This was the first National Football League championship game)
- Rose Bowl (1931 season):
  - The USC Trojans won 21–12 over the Tulane Green Wave to win the college football national championship
- Michigan Wolverines – college football national championship shared with USC Trojans
- Washington Redskins founded in Boston; start off as the Boston Braves

== Association football ==
England

- The Football League – Everton 56 points, Arsenal 54, Sheffield Wednesday 50, Huddersfield Town 48, Aston Villa 46, West Bromwich Albion 46
- FA Cup final – Newcastle United 2–1 Arsenal at Empire Stadium, Wembley, London

France

- A professional football league Division Nationale, first official game held on September 11, as predecessor for Ligue 1.

Germany

- National Championship – Bayern Munich 2–0 Eintracht Frankfurt at Nuremberg

Spain

- La Liga won by Real Madrid

Italy

- Serie A won by Juventus

== Athletics ==
Men's 100 metres

- Eddie Tolan (USA) breaks the world record by running a time of 10.3 seconds

== Australian rules football ==
VFL Premiership

- Richmond wins the 36th VFL Premiership, defeating Carlton 13.14 (92) to 12.11 (83) in the 1932 VFL Grand Final

Brownlow Medal

- The annual Brownlow Medal is awarded to Haydn Bunton senior (Fitzroy)

South Australian National Football League

- 1 October: Sturt won its fourth SA(N)FL premiership, beating North Adelaide 16.14 (110) to 10.9 (69)
- Magarey Medal won by Max Pontifex (West Torrens)

Western Australian National Football League

- 8 October: West Perth win their fifth WA(N)FL premiership but first since 1905, beating East Perth 18.9 (117) to 10.14 (74)
- Sandover Medal won by Keith Hough (Claremont-Cottesloe)

== Bandy ==
Sweden

- Championship final – IF Karlstad-Göta 3–2 Västerås SK

== Baseball ==
World Series

- 28 September to 2 October — New York Yankees defeats Chicago Cubs to win the 1932 World Series by 4 games to 0. In Game 3, Babe Ruth hits his famous "called shot" home run, which is followed immediately by a Lou Gehrig solo home run.

Events

- Brooklyn's major league baseball team, known informally until now as the “Superbas”, the “Robins”, or the “Trolley Dodgers”, officially selects the name Brooklyn Dodgers

== Basketball ==
Events

- The 1932 South American Basketball Championship in Santiago, Chile, is won by Uruguay.

== Bobsleigh ==
Olympic Games (Men's Competition)

Two bobsleigh events are held at the 1932 Winter Olympics in Lake Placid :

- 2-man bob – gold: USA I; silver: Switzerland II; bronze: USA II
- 4-man bob – gold: USA I; silver: USA II; bronze: Germany I

== Boxing ==
Events

- Jack Sharkey wins the World Heavyweight Championship, defeating Max Schmeling on points over 15 rounds.

Lineal world champions

- World Heavyweight Championship – Max Schmeling → Jack Sharkey
- World Light Heavyweight Championship – Maxie Rosenbloom
- World Middleweight Championship – vacant
- World Welterweight Championship – Lou Brouillard → Jackie Fields
- World Lightweight Championship – Tony Canzoneri
- World Featherweight Championship – Bat Battalino → vacant
- World Bantamweight Championship – Panama Al Brown
- World Flyweight Championship – vacant

== Canadian football ==
Grey Cup

- 20th Grey Cup in the Canadian Football League – Hamilton Tigers 25–6 Regina Roughriders

== Cricket ==
Events

- India plays its first Test match, against England. England wins by 159 runs.

England

- County Championship – Yorkshire
- Minor Counties Championship – Buckinghamshire
- Most runs – Herbert Sutcliffe 3,336 @ 74.13 (HS 313)
- Most wickets – Tich Freeman 253 @ 16.39 (BB 9–61)
- Wisden Cricketers of the Year – Ewart Astill, Freddie Brown, Alec Kennedy, C. K. Nayudu, Bill Voce

Australia

- Sheffield Shield – New South Wales
- Most runs – Don Bradman 1,403 @ 116.91 (HS 299*)
- Most wickets – Clarrie Grimmett 77 @ 19.93 (BB 7–83)

India

- Bombay Quadrangular – not contested

New Zealand

- Plunket Shield – Wellington

South Africa

- Currie Cup – Western Province

West Indies

- Inter-Colonial Tournament – Trinidad and Tobago

== Curling ==
1932 Winter Olympics

- Curling is a demonstration event at the 1932 Winter Olympic Games between four teams from Canada and four from the United States, Canada winning by 12 games to 4

== Cycling ==
Tour de France

- André Leducq wins the 26th Tour de France

Events

- Antonio Pesenti wins the 1932 Giro d'Italia

== Field hockey ==
1932 Summer Olympics (Men)

- Gold Medal – India
- Silver Medal – Japan
- Bronze Medal – USA

== Figure skating ==
World Figure Skating Championships

- World Men's Champion – Karl Schäfer (Austria)
- World Women's Champion – Sonja Henie (Norway)
- World Pairs Champions – Andreé Joly-Brunet and Pierre Brunet (France)

1932 Winter Olympics

- Men's individual – Karl Schäfer (Austria)
- Women's individual – Sonja Henie (Norway)
- Pairs – Andreé Joly-Brunet and Pierre Brunet (France)

== Golf ==
Major tournaments

- British Open – Gene Sarazen
- U.S. Open – Gene Sarazen
- PGA Championship – Olin Dutra

Other tournaments

- British Amateur – John de Forest
- U.S. Amateur – Ross Somerville
- Women's Western Open – Jane Weiller

== Harness racing ==
USA

- Hambletonian – The Marchioness
- Kentucky Futurity – The Marchioness

== Horse racing ==
England

- Champion Hurdle – Insurance
- Cheltenham Gold Cup – Golden Miller (first of five successive wins)
- Grand National – Forbra
- 1,000 Guineas Stakes – Kandy
- 2,000 Guineas Stakes – Orwell
- The Derby – April the Fifth
- The Oaks – Udaipur
- St. Leger Stakes – Firdaussi

Australia

- Melbourne Cup – Peter Pan III

Canada

- King's Plate – Queensway

France

- Prix de l'Arc de Triomphe – Motrico

Ireland

- Irish Grand National – Copper Court
- Irish Derby Stakes – Dastur

USA

- Kentucky Derby – Burgoo King
- Preakness Stakes – Burgoo King
- Belmont Stakes – Faireno

== Ice hockey ==
Stanley Cup

- 5–9 April — Toronto Maple Leafs defeat the New York Rangers in the 1932 Stanley Cup Finals by 3 games to 0

Ice Hockey World Championships

- Gold Medal – Canada
- Silver Medal – USA
- Bronze Medal – Germany

1932 Winter Olympics

- Gold Medal – Canada
- Silver Medal – USA
- Bronze Medal – Germany

== Nordic skiing ==
Olympic Games (Men's Competition)

- Cross-country skiing (18 km) – gold medal: Sven Utterström (Sweden)
- Cross-country skiing (50 km) – gold medal: Veli Saarinen (Finland)
- Ski jumping – gold medal: Birger Ruud (Norway)
- Nordic combined – gold medal: Johan Grøttumsbråten (Norway)

== Olympic Games ==
1932 Winter Olympics

- The 1932 Winter Olympics takes place at Lake Placid
- United States team wins the most medals (12) and the most gold medals (6)

1932 Summer Olympics

- The 1932 Summer Olympics takes place at Los Angeles
- United States team wins the most medals (103) and the most gold medals (41)

== Rowing ==
The Boat Race

- 19 March — Cambridge wins the 84th Oxford and Cambridge Boat Race

== Rugby league ==
- 1932 Great Britain Lions tour

England

- Championship – St. Helens
- Challenge Cup final – Leeds 11–8 Swinton at Central Park, Wigan
- Lancashire League Championship – St. Helens
- Yorkshire League Championship – Hunslet
- Lancashire County Cup – Salford 10–8 Swinton
- Yorkshire County Cup – Huddersfield 4–2 Hunslet

Australia

- NSW Premiership – South Sydney 19–12 Western Suburbs (Grand Final)

== Rugby union ==
Home Nations Championship

- 45th Home Nations Championship series is shared by England, Ireland and Wales

== Snooker ==
World Championship

- 6th World Snooker Championship is won by Joe Davis who defeats Clark McConachy 30–19

== Speed skating ==
Speed Skating World Championships

- Men's All-round Champion – Ivar Ballangrud (Norway)

1932 Winter Olympics (Men)

- 500m – gold medal: Jack Shea (USA)
- 1500m – gold medal: Jack Shea (USA)
- 5000m – gold medal: Irving Jaffee (USA)
- 10000m – gold medal: Irving Jaffee (USA)

1932 Winter Olympics (Women)

- Women's speed skating is held as a demonstration event only with competitions over 500m, 1000m and 1500m.

== Tennis ==
Australia

- Australian Men's Singles Championship – Jack Crawford (Australia) defeats Harry Hopman (Australia) 4–6, 6–3, 3–6, 6–3, 6–1
- Australian Women's Singles Championship – Coral Buttsworth (Australia) defeats Kathleen Le Messurier (Australia) 9–7, 6–4

England

- Wimbledon Men's Singles Championship – Ellsworth Vines (USA) defeats Bunny Austin (Great Britain) 6–2, 6–2, 6–0
- Wimbledon Women's Singles Championship – Helen Wills Moody (USA) defeats Helen Jacobs (USA) 6–3, 6–1

France

- French Men's Singles Championship – Henri Cochet (France) defeats Giorgio de Stefani (Italy) 6–0, 6–4, 4–6, 6–3
- French Women's Singles Championship – Helen Wills Moody (USA) defeats Simonne Mathieu (France) 7–5, 6–1

USA

- American Men's Singles Championship – Ellsworth Vines (USA) defeats Henri Cochet (France) 6–4, 6–4, 6–4
- American Women's Singles Championship – Helen Jacobs (USA) defeats Carolin Babcock Stark (USA) 6–2, 6–2

Davis Cup

- 1932 International Lawn Tennis Challenge – France 3–2 United States at Stade Roland Garros (clay) Paris, France

== Awards ==
Associated Press Athlete of the Year

- Associated Press Male Athlete of the Year – Gene Sarazen (golf)
- Associated Press Female Athlete of the Year – Babe Didrikson (athletics)
