= Italy at the FIS Alpine World Ski Championships 1932 =

Italy at the 1932 FIS Alpine World Ski Championships
- IOC code: ITA
- National federation: FISI
- Website: www.fisi.org

in (Italy) Cortina d'Ampezzo
- Competitors: 11 (6 men, 5 women)
- Medals Ranked 3rd: Gold 1 Silver 0 Bronze 0 Total 1

FIS Alpine World Ski Championships appearances (overview)
- 1931; 1932; 1933; 1934; 1935; 1936; 1937; 1938; 1939; 1948; 1950; 1952; 1954; 1956; 1958; 1960; 1962; 1964; 1966; 1968; 1970; 1972; 1974; 1976; 1978; 1980; 1982; 1985; 1987; 1989; 1991; 1993; 1996; 1997; 1999; 2001; 2003; 2005; 2007; 2009; 2011; 2013; 2015; 2017; 2019; 2021

Italy competed at the FIS Alpine World Ski Championships 1932 in Cortina d'Ampezzo, Italy, from 4 to 6 February 1932.

== Medalists ==
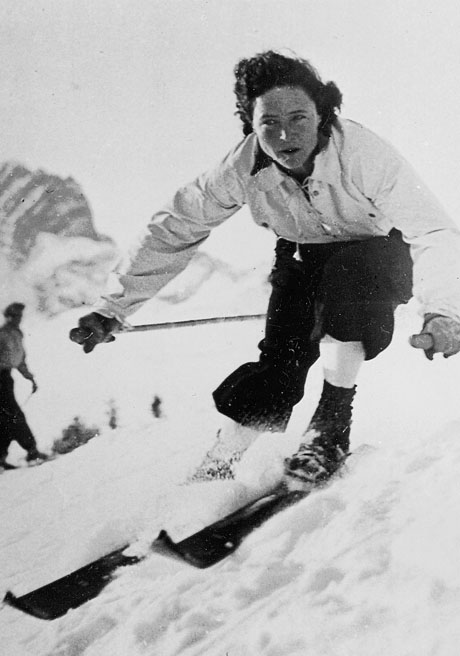
Paula Wiesinger, first medal of ever for the Italy national alpine ski team won in downhill in Cortina 1932.

Athlete	Gendre	Event	Medal
Paula Wiesinger	Women	Downhill	GOLD

== Results ==
=== Men ===
Skier	Slalom	Downhill	Combined
Renato Valle	7	5	8
Ferdinando Valle	17	21	17
Franco Kostner	21	26	25
Dario Demenego	25	19	22
Roberto Zardini	30	25	27
Enrico Lacedelli	-	DNF	-

=== Women ===
Skier	Slalom	Downhill	Combined
Paula Wiesinger	13	1	6
Elena Schott	15	19	16
Livia Bertolini	17	25	21
Velo Delly	28	26	27
Isaline Crivelli	DNF	29	-

== See also ==
- Italy at the FIS Alpine World Ski Championships
- Italy national alpine ski team
