= Beinhauer =

Beinhauer is a German occupational surname meaning 'butcher'. It is derived from the archaic German words bein ('bone') and houwer ('chopper'). The surname also appears in Czech (feminine: Beinhauerová). Notable people with the surname include:

- Radek Beinhauer (born 1969), Czech swimmer
- Růžena Beinhauerová (1912–1968), Czech alpine skier
- Werner Beinhauer (1896–1983), German philologist and Hispanist
