= FIS Alpine World Ski Championships 1932 – Women's downhill =

Women's downhill at the FIS Alpine World Ski Championships 1932
- Location: Cortina d'Ampezzo, Italy
- Dates: 4 February
- Competitors: 33 from 7 nations
- Winning time: 7.13.8

Medalists
gold medal	Paula Wiesinger	Italy
silver medal	Inge Wersin-Lantschner	Austria
bronze medal	Hady Lantschner	Austria

The Women's downhill competition at the FIS Alpine World Ski Championships 1932 was held on 4 February.

== Results ==
Place	Skier	Country	Time
1st place, gold medalist(s)	Paola Wiesinger	Italy	7.13.8
2nd place, silver medalist(s)	Inge Lantschner-Wersin	Austria	7.17.8
3rd place, bronze medalist(s)	Hadwig Lantschner	Austria	7.25.0
4	Audrey Sale-Barker	United Kingdom	7.40.6
5	Wendy Tarbutt	United Kingdom	7.59.6
6	Ella Maillart	Switzerland	8.01.0
7	Gerda Paumgarten	Austria	8.01.6
8	Roesli Streiff	Switzerland	8.06.4
9	Maedi Schmidt	Germany	8.07.2
10	Irma von Schmiedegg	Austria	8.15.0
11	Doreen Elliott	United Kingdom	8.21.0
12	Grete Matousek	Germany	8.35.0
13	Zofja Stopkowna	Poland	8.40.0
14	Lisa Resch	Germany	9.01.0
15	Bronislawa Polankowna	Poland	9.04.6
16	Dorothy Crewdson	United Kingdom	9.06.2
17	Helene Zingg	Switzerland	9.09.6
18	Annemarie Kopp	Germany	9.20.4
19	Elena Schott	Italy	9.26.4
20	Lois Butler	United Kingdom	9.28.0
21	Annemarie Hoenigman-Hoerwarth	Germany	9.34.0
22	Emmy Ripper	Austria	9.37.6
23	Helen Boughton-Leigh	United Kingdom	9.42.2
24	Fini Schmidt	Germany	10.00.0
25	Livia Bertolini	Italy	10.10.2
26	Velo Delly	Italy	10.40.4
27	Gabriela von Szapary	Hungary	10.48.2
28	Kaethe Lettner	Austria	11.34.4
29	Isalina Crivelli	Italy	12.25.0
30	Ela Zietkiewicz	Poland	14.13.6
DNF	Martha von Allmen	Switzerland	
DNF	Charlotte Speer	Germany	
