= Alpine skiing at the 1936 Winter Olympics – Women's combined =

Women's combined at the IV Olympic Winter Games
- Alpine skiing
- Venue: Kreuzjoch (downhill); Gudiberg (slalom); Garmisch-Partenkirchen, Germany
- Date: 7 February 1936 (downhill); 8 February 1936 (slalom)
- Competitors: 37 from 13 nations
- Winning time: 97.06 points (7:45.5)

Medalists
1st place, gold medalist(s)		Christl Cranz	Germany
2nd place, silver medalist(s)		Käthe Grasegger	Germany
3rd place, bronze medalist(s)		Laila Schou Nilsen	Norway

Women's Combined Downhill
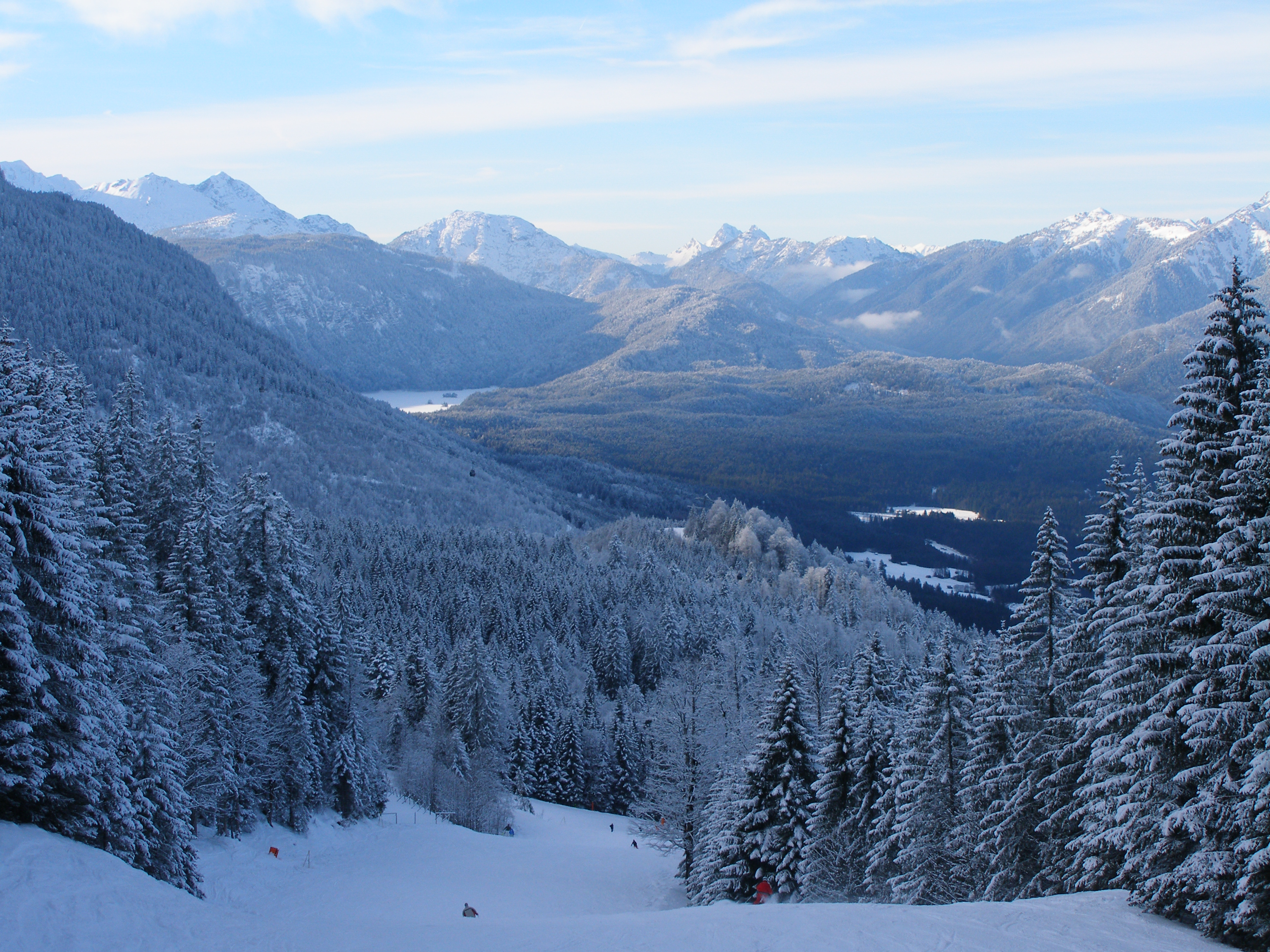
- Interactive map of Women's Combined; Downhill
- Location: Kreuzjoch
- Vertical: 820 m (2,690 ft)
- Top elevation: 1,580 m (5,184 ft)
- Base elevation: 760 m (2,493 ft)

Location in the Alps of Europe

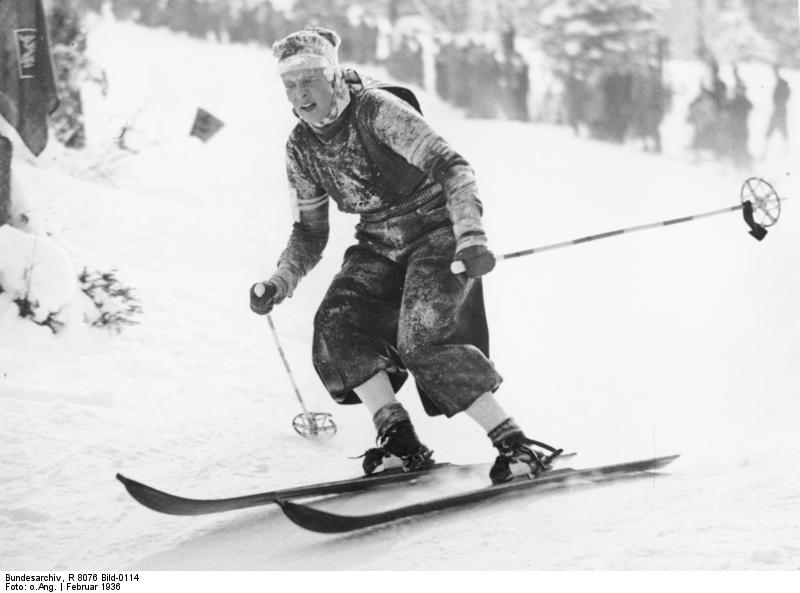
Jeanette Kessler of Great Britain during the downhill; she finished 12th in the downhill and 8th overall.

The women's combined event was part of the alpine skiing program at the 1936 Winter Olympics. It was the debut of alpine skiing at the Winter Olympics, and was the only women's event. The competition consisted of a downhill race on Friday, 7 February and two slalom runs on Saturday, 8 February. Thirty-seven alpine skiers from 13 nations competed.

== Downhill ==
The downhill race was held on Friday, 7 February, and the start was below the summit of Kreuzjoch at an elevation of 1,580 metres (5,184 ft). The finish was at the bottom station of the Kreuzeckbahn tramway at 760 m (2,493 ft) for a vertical drop of 820 m (2,690 ft) and a course length of 3.300 km (2.05 mi).

The race started at 11 a.m. and the conditions were good, with temperatures at the start from −5 to −4 °C (23 to 25 °F). Laila Schou Nilsen of Norway had the best time at 5:04.4 for an average speed of 39.0 km/h (24.2 mph), with an average vertical descent rate of 2.69 m/s (8.8 ft/s).

All starters were able to finish the race. The men's downhill race followed and was begun at noon.

Place	No.	Competitor	Time	Difference	Points
1	16	Laila Schou Nilsen (NOR)	5:04.4		100.00
2	9	Lisa Resch (GER)	5:08.4	+4.0	98.70
3	6	Käthe Grasegger (GER)	5:11.0	+6.6	97.88
4	31	Erna Steuri (SUI)	5:20.4	+16.0	95.01
5	13	Hady Pfeiffer (GER)	5:21.6	+17.2	94.65
6	11	Christl Cranz (GER)	5:23.4	+19.0	94.12
7	1	Evelyn Pinching (GBR)	5:27.2	+22.8	93.03
8	26	Johanne Dybwad (NOR)	5:32.0	+27.6	91.69
9	23	Marcelle Bühler (SUI)	5:51.6	+47.2	86.58
10	4	Paula Wiesinger (ITA)	5:55.2	+50.8	85.70
11	40	Nora Strømstad (NOR)	5:57.4	+53.0	85.17
12	10	Jeanette Kessler (GBR)	6:05.4	+1:01.0	83.31
13	5	Gratia Schimmelpenninck van der Oye (NED)	6:09.8	+1:05.4	82.31
14	27	Elizabeth Woolsey (USA)	6:12.8	+1:08.4	81.65
14	29	Grete Nissl (AUT)	6:12.8	+1:08.4	81.65
16	32	Frida Clara (ITA)	6:16.8	+1:12.4	80.79
17	22	Hilda Walterová (TCH)	6:17.8	+1:13.4	80.57
18	8	Lois Butler (CAN)	6:20.0	+1:15.6	80.11
19	28	Birnie Duthie (GBR)	6:37.2	+1:32.8	76.64
20	21	Herta Rosmini (AUT)	6:40.8	+1:36.4	75.95
21	3	Gretl Weikert (AUT)	6:47.0	+1:42.6	74.79
22	30	Růžena Beinhauerová (TCH)	6:54.6	+1:50.2	74.79
23	12	Käthe Lettner (AUT)	7:02.4	+1:58.0	72.06
24	36	Nives Dei Rossi (ITA)	7:03.2	+1:58.8	71.93
25	7	Helen Boughton-Leigh (USA)	7:17.4	+2:13.0	69.59
26	15	Edwina Chamier (CAN)	7:21.0	+2:16.6	69.02
27	24	Iseline Crivelli (ITA)	7:24.4	+2:20.0	68.50
28	20	Helen Blane (GBR)	7:26.4	+2:22.0	68.19
29	25	Marion Miller (CAN)	7:30.4	+2:26.0	67.58
30	38	Clarita Heath (USA)	7:39.2	+2:34.8	66.29
31	18	Karin Peckert-Forsman (EST)	7:58.4	+2:54.0	63.63
32	33	Diana Gordon-Lennox (CAN)	8:03.8	+2:59.4	62.92
33	19	Mary Bird (USA)	8:32.4	+3:28.0	59.41
34	35	Trude Möhwaldová (TCH)	8:46.8	+3:44.4	57.78
35	39	Margot Moles (ESP)	10:52.4	+5:50.0	46.66
36	17	Mirdza Martinsone (LAT)	15:21.6	+10:17.2	33.03
37	34	Ernestina Maenza (ESP)	18:51.4	+13:47.0	26.90
–	2	Anny Rüegg (SUI)	–	–	DNS
–	14	Mariann Szapáry (HUN)	–	–	DNS
–	37	Eli Petersen (NOR)	–	–	DNS

== Slalom ==
Women's Combined Slalom
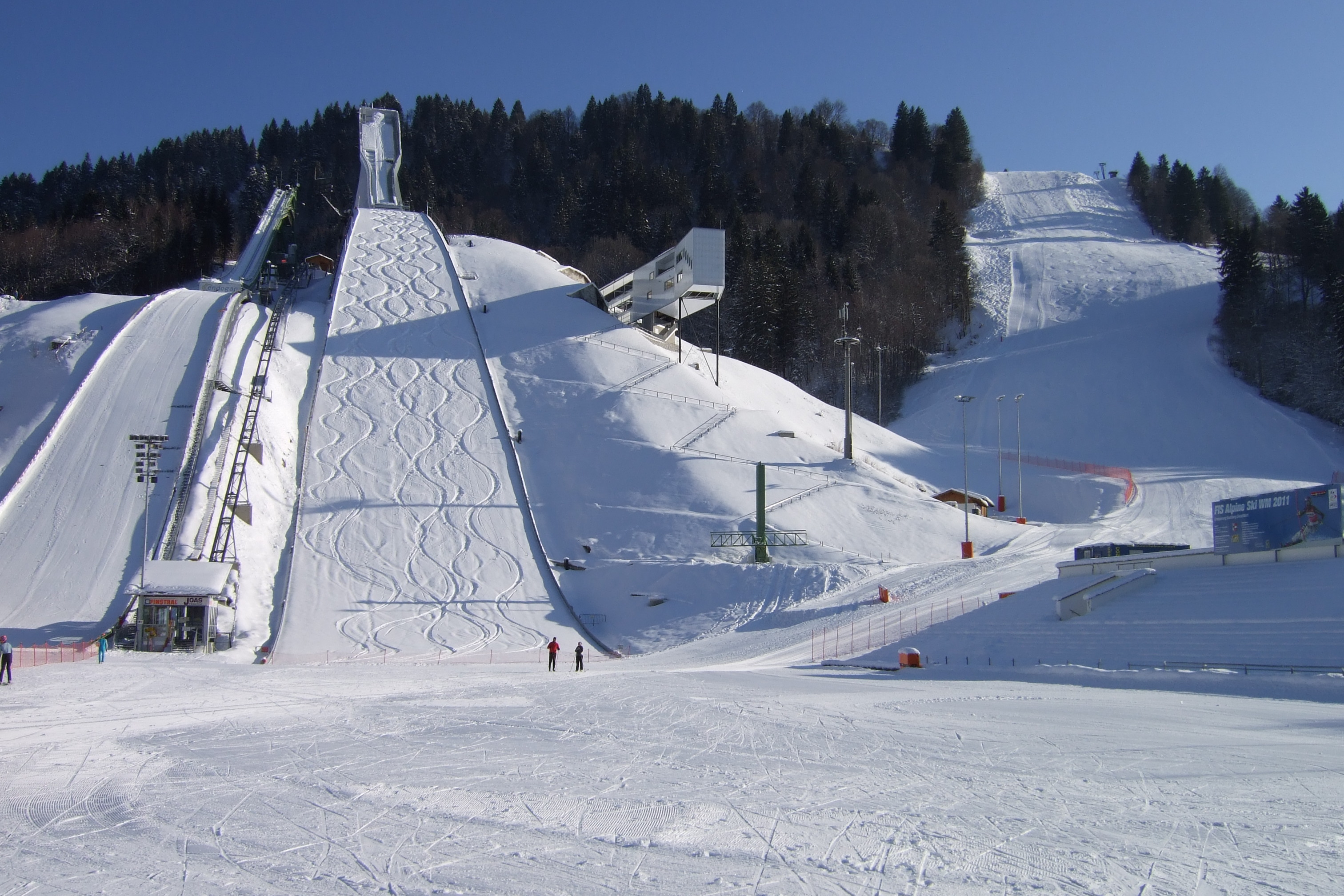
- Interactive map of Women's Combined; Slalom
- Location: Gudiberg
- Vertical: 200 m (656 ft)
- Top elevation: 950 m (3,117 ft)
- Base elevation: 750 m (2,461 ft)

The slalom race was held on Saturday, 8 February 1936 on the slalom slope at Gudiberg.

The conditions were good with temperatures of −8 to −4 °C (18 to 25 °F). The vertical drop was 200 metres (656 ft) and the length of the course was 600 metres (0.37 mi) with 23 gates. Penalties were added to the finishing time when competitors missed a gate.

The race started at 11 a.m. The men's slalom was run the following day.

== Final standings ==
After the downhill race and the two slalom heats, the points results were averaged to determine the winner.

Place	No.	Competitor	Downhill	Slalom	Average
1st place, gold medalist(s)	11	Christl Cranz (GER)	94.12	100.00	97.06
2nd place, silver medalist(s)	6	Käthe Grasegger (GER)	97.88	92.63	95.26
3rd place, bronze medalist(s)	16	Laila Schou Nilsen (NOR)	100.00	86.96	93.48
4	31	Erna Steuri (SUI)	95.01	89.71	92.36
5	13	Hady Pfeiffer (GER)	94.65	89.04	91.85
6	9	Lisa Resch (GER)	98.70	78.77	88.74
7	26	Johanne Dybwad (NOR)	91.69	80.10	85.90
8	10	Jeanette Kessler (GBR)	83.31	84.63	83.97
9	1	Evelyn Pinching (GBR)	93.03	71.34	82.19
10	23	Marcelle Bühler (SUI)	86.58	71.16	78.87
