= Mirdza =

- Gender: Female
- Name day: 23 March

Origin
- Meaning: glow
- Region of origin: Latvia

Mirdza is a Latvian given name and may refer to:

- Mirdza Bendrupe (1910–1995), Latvian writer
- Mirdza Ķempe (1907–1974), Latvian poet
- Mirdza Martinsone (born 1951), Latvian actress
- Mirdza Martinsone (1916–1983), Latvian skier
- Mirdza Zīvere (born 1953), Latvian singer
