= Karin Peckert-Forsman =

Estonian alpine skier

Personal information
- Nationality: Estonian
- Born: 24 February 1905 Tallinn, Governorate of Estonia, Russian Empire

Sport
- Sport: Alpine skiing

Karin Peckert-Forsman (born 24 February 1905 in Tallinn, date of death unknown) was an Estonian alpine skier. She competed in the women's combined event at the 1936 Winter Olympics. She was the first woman to represent Estonia at the Olympics.
