= 1944 Birthday Honours (MBE) =

The 1944 King's Birthday Honours, celebrating the official birthday of King George VI, were announced on 2 June 1944 for the United Kingdom and British Empire, New Zealand, and South Africa.

It included a large number of people who were appointed Member of the Order of the British Empire.

The recipients of honours are displayed here as they were styled before their new honour, and arranged by honour, with classes (Knight, Knight Grand Cross, etc.) and then divisions (Military, Civil, etc.) as appropriate.

== Military Division ==
=== Royal Navy ===
- Lieutenant-Commander Robert Edward Sanders, RNR.
- Temporary Lieutenant-Commander Herbert Alexander Dixon, RNVR. (Newcastle upon Tyne).
- Temporary Lieutenant-Commander William James Muddock, RNVR. (Kingston).
- Lieutenant-Commander Benjamin Whitcutt, Burma RNVR.
- Acting Temporary Lieutenant-Commander (A) Geoffrey Hamilton Bates, RNVR. (East Sheen).
- Acting Temporary Lieutenant-Commander (A) William Arthur Jevons Street, RNVR (Cheswerdine, Shropshire).
- Lieutenant-Commander (E) Raymond Hadyn Tribe. (Compton, Berkshire).
- Acting Engineer Lieutenant-Commander William McDonald, RNR (Retd).
- Acting Temporary Lieutenant-Commander (E) Bernard Seymour Tharp, RNR.
- Acting Paymaster Lieutenant-Commander Charles Joseph Richard Souhamy. (Plymouth).
- Acting Paymaster Lieutenant-Commander Peter White. (Amersham).
- Acting Shipwright Lieutenant-Commander Harry Watson, (Retd).
- Temporary Captain (Acting Temporary Major) John Morrice Cairns James, Royal Marines (Marlborough).
- Lieutenant (Acting Major) John Dane Henderson Salter, Royal Marines (Milton, Hampshire).
- The Reverend Geoffrey Phillips Beaumont, BA, Temporary Chaplain, RNVR.
- The Reverend David Herbert Booth, MA, Temporary Chaplain, RNVR.
- Lieutenant Richard Edmond John Fowler, (Retd). (Portsmouth).
- Lieutenant Frederick John Harding. (Glasgow).
- Lieutenant Peter John Stephen Hardinge. (Pitney, Somerset).
- Lieutenant Frank Leonard Leeder.
- Lieutenant Richard Francis McDermott, (Retd).
- Lieutenant Herbert Frank Short.
- Temporary Lieutenant Ernest Ronald Wray, RNR.
- Acting Lieutenant Raleigh Thomas Rowe, RNVR. (Cockfosters, Hertfordshire).
- Temporary Lieutenant John Ebner Glen, RNVR. (Glasgow).
- Temporary Lieutenant John Prys Williams, RNVR. (Bracknell, Berkshire).
- Lieutenant John Ernest Rimmer, Royal Indian Naval Volunteer Reserve.
- Lieutenant (A) George Archibald Wycliffe Goodwin. (Bognor Regis).
- Lieutenant (A) Basil Sinclair. (Hexham).
- Lieutenant (E) Lewis Leslie Broad, RNR.
- Temporary Lieutenant (E) John Campbell Moody, RNR. (Biggar, Scotland).
- Paymaster Lieutenant Reuben Brampton Corkrey, (Retd). (Cowplain, Hampshire).
- Paymaster Lieutenant Owen Michael Lewin, RNR. (Minster, Sheppey).
- Skipper Lieutenant Edward Spencer Rilatt, RD, RNR (Retd) 2489 W.S. (Hull).
- Chief Boom Skipper Edward John Bracher, RNR.
- Temporary Lieutenant (Quartermaster) Frederick Victor Borrett, Royal Marines (Oxford).
- Jean Davies, First Officer, WRNS.
- Heather Hayes, First Officer, WRNS.
- Mr. Robert Hart Robertson, Commissioned Gunner. (Cardonald, Glasgow).
- Mr. Harold Richard Ben Smith, Gunner, Royal Military Navy (Stapleford Abbot, Essex).
- Mr. Frank Ebling, Acting Commissioned Photographer.
- Mr. John Henry Cook, Commissioned Shipwright. (Newcastle upon Tyne).
- Mr. Albert Edward Allcock, Commissioned Engineer. (Durban, South Africa).
- Mr. Leonard George Nathaniel Linder, Commissioned Engineer. (Purbrook).
- Mr. John Watkins Northwood, DSC, Commissioned Engineer. (Ludlow).
- Mr. Herbert William Lacon, Commissioned Wardmaster. (Weymouth).
- Mr. Reuben Daniel Wade, Warrant Shipwright. (Cosham, Hampshire).
- Mr. George Ernest Whittle, Temporary Warrant Master-at-Arms.
- Mr. Reginald Arthur Jackson, Temporary Warrant Engineer.
- Mr. Percy Frederick Hale, Warrant Mechanician.
- Mr. Samuel John Taylor, First Radio Officer, RNR, NAP/964525 (Herne Bay).
- Staff Sergeant Major Reginald James Brooks, Royal Marines (Deal).
- Superintending Clerk John William Johnson, Royal Marines.
- Lieutenant-Commander Neville Drake Pixley, Royal Australian Naval Reserve.
- Mr. Ralph Lane, Commissioned Telegraphist, Royal Australian Navy.
- Mr. Frederick Gardner, Temporary Gunner, Royal New Zealand Navy.

=== Army ===
- Captain (Quartermaster) Richard Abbott (77283), The Border Regiment, Territorial Army.
- Captain (temporary) Major John Amos, MB, (102123), Royal Army Medical Corps.
- Captain (temporary Major) Leonard Reginald Anderson (Quartermaster), Indian Army Ordnance Corps.
- Lieutenant (temporary Captain) Louis Douglas Ann (185142), General List.
- Major Laurence Wilfred Arnett, North Riding Home Guard.
- Captain (temporary Major) Joseph Asplin (319618), General List.
- Captain (Quartermaster) (temporary Major) Stanley Robert Astley, Indian Army.
- Regimental Sergeant-Major Ziyayi Banda, Northern Rhodesia Regiment.
- Captain (temporary Major) Lindsay Barclay (176047), South African Medical Corps.
- Captain (temporary Major) Henry David Hardington Bartlett (93379), Royal Artillery, Territorial Army.
- Major (Quartermaster) Herbert Ralph Barton, MC, 13th Frontier Force Rifles, Indian Army.
- Lieutenant (Assistant Inspector of Armourers) Charles William Beardall (282872), Royal Electrical and Mechanical Engineers.
- Captain (temporary Major) George Gordon Bell (70643), Royal Tank Regiment, Royal Armoured Corps.
- Lieutenant H. A. Bennet, Trinidad Home Guard.
- Lieutenant (temporary Captain) Frank Albert Edmund Bjorseth (73259), South African Armoured Corps.
- Major (Staff Paymaster 2nd Class) (temporary Lieutenant-Colonel, Staff Paymaster 1st Class) Cecil Charles Blackwell (6240), Royal Army Pay Corps.
- 7591424 Warrant Officer Class II Quartermaster-Sergeant Albert Sidney Bolton, Royal Electrical and Mechanical Engineers.
- No. 7603434 Warrant Officer Class I Sub-Conductor Laurence Antoine Edward Butler Bourlay, Royal Army Ordnance Corps.
- Captain (temporary Major) Reginald Brandon, AMInstCE, (181572), Royal Engineers.
- Lieutenant (acting Captain) Henry Hill Brewer, MC, (46531), Reserve of Officers, General List.
- Lieutenant (temporary Captain) Arthur Brookes (245894), Royal Army Service Corps.
- No. 846872 Warrant Officer Class I Sergeant-Major Assistant Instructor Henry John Brown, Royal Artillery.
- Lieutenant (temporary Captain) Herbert Francis Granger-Brown (102540), The Devonshire Regiment.
- Captain (Quartermaster) Thomas Alfred Brown (75986), Royal Artillery.
- Lieutenant Gordon James Buck, 13th Frontier Force Rifles, Indian Army.
- Major Arthur Clifford Howie Bull, Hertfordshire Home Guard.
- Major (Commissary) Bernard Burke, Royal Indian Army Service Corps.
- Captain (Quartermaster) Clifford Burton (144488), The Royal Welch Fusiliers.
- No. 3241 Battery Sergeant Major Emanuel Buttigieg (3241), Royal Malta Artillery.
- Major (temporary Lieutenant-Colonel) Harold Ernest Caldwell (99119), Royal Army Ordnance Corps.
- No. 7588402 Sub-Conductor James Caldwell, Royal Army Ordnance Corps.
- Captain (temporary Major) Charles Calder (76219), Royal Artillery, Territorial Army.
- Major (Quartermaster) Bertie Henry Capel, Indian Army.
- Captain (temporary Major) James Carreras (160321), Royal Artillery.
- Captain (temporary Major) Eric Archibald Catesby (99688), Royal Electrical and Mechanical Engineers, Territorial Army.
- Major Edmund Cawkell, Essex Home Guard.
- Lieutenant (temporary Captain) Jack Howarthe Paul Chadburn (202411), Intelligence Corps.
- Captain (temporary Major) Arthur Randolph Coningsby Chapman, MC, (21423), Territorial Army, Reserve of Officers, The Royal Scots (The Royal Regiment).
- Captain (Quartermaster) Frederick Charles Cheetham (92277), Royal Artillery (Territorial Army).
- Major Samuel John Chesser (101280), Royal Army Medical Corps.
- Major (temporary Lieutenant-Colonel) Guy Chignell (74560), Royal Artillery, Territorial Army.
- Captain (temporary Major) William Middleton Chrispin (127016), Royal Army Service Corps.
- Major George Smith Christie, Aberdeen and Kincardine Home Guard.
- Captain (temporary Major) Stanley William Clark (182533), Royal. Artillery.
- Lieutenant-Colonel (Quartermaster) Frederick Clare, DCM, (31070), Extra Regimentally Employed List.
- Captain (Deputy Commissary) (temporary Major) Herbert Geoffrey Coates, Indian Army Ordnance Corps.
- Captain (Quartermaster) Henry James Ironside Coker (137699), The Durham Light Infantry.
- Lieutenant (temporary Captain) Colin Richard James Connors (42192), Royal Engineers.
- Lieutenant (Quartermaster) Harry Edward Cook (181952), General List.
- Major (temporary Lieutenant-Colonel) Eustace Haynes Peel Corbin (30019), The King's Own Royal Regiment (Lancaster) (Territorial Army).
- Captain (temporary Major) John Bisp Cossens (89169), The Somerset Light Infantry (Prince Albert's) Territorial Army.
- Second-Lieutenant James Cottam, late West Riding Home Guard.
- Captain George Henry Cotton, Southern Railway Home Guard.
- Captain (temporary Major) Thomas James Cowen (121118), The Border Regiment.
- Captain (temporary Major) Charles Burton Edward Cowie (161330), The East Surrey Regiment.
- No. 5766720 Warrant Officer Class I, Staff Sergeant Major William Thomas Crisp, Royal Army Service Corps.
- Lieutenant Andrew Basil Crosby, Surrey Home Guard.
- Captain (Quartermaster) (temporary Major) William John Patrick Croft (147934), The Royal Northumberland Fusiliers.
- Captain (temporary Major) Alexander William Thomas Cross (110599), Royal Engineers.
- Captain (Brevet Major) (temporary Major) Francis George Crozier (6504), The Buffs (Royal East Kent Regiment).
- Major Aldington George Curphey, MC, Jamaica Medical Corps.
- No. 1862515 Company Sergeant Major Herbert Thomas Cypher, Royal Engineers.
- Captain (temporary Major) William James Damerell, Royal Indian Army Service Corps.
- Major Walter William Scott-Davidson, Kinross Home Guard.
- Captain Arthur William Davies, Surrey Home Guard.
- Captain (temporary Major) (acting Lieutenant-Colonel) James Runciman Denny (52948), The Royal Warwickshire Regiment.
- No. 1652623 Warrant Officer Class II (acting Warrant Officer Class I) John Denton, Army Educational Corps.
- Lieutenant (temporary Captain) (acting Major) John Henry Dirs (266333), Royal Corps of Signals.
- Lieutenant (Quartermaster) William Arthur Dixon (199891), The Bedfordshire and Hertfordshire Regiment.
- Captain (temporary Major) Clifford Alfred Dove (108008), Royal Engineers.
- Captain (temporary Major) George Greig Dow (147011), Royal Artillery.
- Major Archibald James Macalpine-Downie (33678), late Royal Tank Regiment, Royal Armoured Corps.
- Temporary Major William Douglas Draffan, The King's African Rifles.
- No. 93654 Warrant Officer Class II Staff Quartermaster Sergeant (acting Warrant Officer Class I Staff Sergeant-Major) Norman Draper, Royal Army Service Corps.
- No. 5719502 Warrant Officer Class I Regimental Sergeant-Major Frederick George Drew, The Dorsetshire Regiment.
- Captain (temporary Major) Archibald Loraine Dunbar (224717), Royal Artillery.
- Lieutenant (temporary Captain) Albert James Ede (60719), Royal Artillery, retired, reemployed.
- Regimental Sergeant-Major Samuel Arthur Edwards, Middlesex Home Guard.
- Captain Frank Stokes Ellis, Sussex Home Guard.
- Captain (temporary Major) Dennis Ewart Evans (151067), Royal Artillery.
- Lieutenant-Colonel Herbert Fairhurst, MA, (275397), Army Cadet Force (Berkshire).
- Captain (temporary Major) Robert Angus William Farmer, Indian Engineers, Indian Army.
- Lieutenant-Colonel Hugh Bellwood Farrer (283443), Army Cadet Force (Ayrshire).
- Major John Wilfred Joseph Faull, Glamorganshire Home Guard.
- Captain (temporary Major) Percy Alwyne Fellowes (75793), Royal Artillery, Territorial Army.
- Captain (Quartermaster) Gorge Henry James Fleming (90663), The Royal Berkshire Regiment (Princess Charlotte of Wales's) (Territorial Army).
- Captain (temporary Major) Daniel Frederick Flood (111054), Royal Army Service Corps.
- Lieutenant (Quartermaster) (temporary Captain) Ernest Alban Fox (185659), Royal Army Service Corps.
- Major John Charles Freeman, Merionethshire Home Guard.
- Captain (temporary Major) Naval Dosabhoy Gandy, Indian Army Service Corps.
- Lieutenant (temporary Captain) Leonard Morris Garwood (259703), Pioneer Corps.
- Captain (temporary Major) George John Getley, Indian Army.
- Captain (acting Lieutenant-Colonel) John Houghton Gibbon (91397), Royal Artillery.
- Lieutenant (temporary Captain) James Adam Gilbert (167327), Royal Engineers.
- Subedar Major Janmeja Singh Gill, Indian Army Corps of Clerks.
- No. 1057664 Warrant Officer Class I, Sergeant Major (Assistant Instructor in Gunnery) George Girling, Royal Artillery.
- Captain (temporary Major) Geoffrey Edward Michael Godfrey (135148), Royal Electrical & Mechanical Engineers.
- Subedar Muhammad Abdul Aziz Khan Gohanavi, Indian Army Medical Corps, Indian Army.
- Lieutenant (temporary Captain) Stanley Gilbert Gover (137799), Royal Corps of Signals.
- Captain Stanley Graves, London Home Guard.
- No. 7610218 Sub-Conductor Herbert John Gray, Royal Army Ordnance Corps.
- Major Hanmer Gethin Bodvel Griffith, Brecknockshire Home Guard.
- Captain (temporary Major) (local Lieutenant-Colonel) Anthony Gibbons Grinling, MC, (46744), The Hertfordshire Regiment, Territorial Army, Reserve of Officers.
- Captain (temporary Major) Frank Wyatt Guenier (99847), Royal Engineers.
- Captain (temporary Major) Peter Spencer Hadley (88627), The Royal Sussex Regiment (Territorial Army).
- Captain (temporary Major) Abdul Hamid, Kapurthala State Forces.
- Major William Reginald Clarence Hamlin, London Anti-Aircraft Home Guard.
- Major Harold Handley, Westmorland Home Guard.
- Major Thomas Winlack Harley, MC, Cheshire Home Guard.
- Captain (temporary Major) William Richard Dobson Harris (92341), Royal Engineers, Territorial Army.
- No. 3434565 Warrant Officer Class I, Regimental Sergeant Major Albert Edward Hawkins, The Lancashire Fusiliers, Territorial Army.
- Junior Commander (temporary Senior Commander) Ida Winifred Hawley (192924), Auxiliary Territorial Service.
- Lieutenant (Assistant Ordnance Mechanical Engineer) (temporary Captain) James Arnold Hawley, Indian Electrical & Mechanical Engineers.
- No. 54414 Staff Sergeant Major Charles Edward Hayball, Royal Army Service Corps.
- Major (Quartermaster) John Joseph Heath, MC, DCM, MM, (44569), The Royal Warwickshire Regiment.
- Major (Quartermaster) William Henry Heath (34699), The Cheshire Regiment.
- Captain (temporary Major) Gerald William Hedley (103453), General List.
- Captain (temporary Major) James Robertson Hendry, TD, (16104), Territorial Army Reserve of Officers, The Highland Light Infantry (City of Glasgow Regiment).
- Captain (Quartermaster) Charles Henry David Henniker (102153), The Royal Ulster Rifles.
- Captain (temporary Major) Thomas William Price Hexley, Royal Indian Army Service Corps.
- Captain (temporary Major) John Jephson Hilary (149651), Royal Army Service Corps.
- No. 3710465 Warrant Officer Class I, Sub-Conductor Alfred Stanley Macnaughton Park-Hill, Indian Army Corps of Clerks.
- No. 2186832 Warrant Officer Class II, Quarter-master Sergeant Reginald Ernest Hodgkins, Pioneer Corps.
- Lieutenant (temporary Captain) Josiah John Honeybunn, 4th Bombay Grenadiers, Indian Army.
- Captain (temporary Major) Paul Hopkinson, 2nd Punjab Regiment, Indian Army.
- Subaltern (temporary Junior Commander) Joyce Eileen Acheson Hose (254364), Auxiliary Territorial Service.
- No. 7718817 Warrant Officer Class II, Quarter-master Sergeant Instructor Charles Henry James Hosegood, Small Arms School Corps.
- Captain (Quartermaster) Ernest George Howe (143640), Lothian & Border Yeomanry, Royal Armoured Corps, Territorial Army.
- Captain (temporary Major) Leonard Cecil Hudson (116504), Royal Engineers.
- Chaplain to the Forces 4th Class the Reverend Owain Tudor Hughes, BA, (102494), Royal Army Chaplains Department.
- Lieutenant (Quartermaster) Wallace George Hulme (270175), Royal Engineers.
- Captain (temporary Major) Luckin Alick Humphrey (137800), Royal Corps of Signals.
- Captain (temporary Major) Harry Vincent Hunt (161762), Royal Engineers.
- Captain (temporary Major) Harold Lyle Hunter (169170), Army Educational Corps.
- Honorary Second Lieutenant Sidney Hurrell, The King's African Rifles.
- Major (Assistant Ordnance Mechanical Engineer) Henry Charles Ingle, Indian Electrical & Mechanical Engineers.
- Major Frank Louis Paul Jones (31628), Royal Army Ordnance Corps.
- Lieutenant (temporary Captain) (acting Major) Peredur Evans-Jones (227530), General List.
- Captain (temporary Major) Rajaram Vishwanath Karve, Royal Indian Army Service Corps.
- Captain (temporary Major) Peter Whorlow Kenyon (68981), Royal Artillery, Territorial Army.
- Captain William Henry Kieffer, North Caribbean Force.
- Captain (temporary Major) Vincent King (126868), Royal Engineers.
- Captain (temporary Major) William Stanley King (166969), Royal Artillery.
- Captain (temporary Major) Geoffrey Cradock Knight (77238), Royal Artillery.
- Lieutenant (temporary Captain) Kharshedji Kaikhoosru Lalkaka (175213), The Wiltshire Regiment (Duke of Edinburgh's).
- Lieutenant (temporary Captain) James Ralph Lane (102936), Royal Army Service Corps.
- No. 750029 Warrant Officer Glass II Regimental Quartermaster Sergeant Henry Lang, Royal Artillery.
- Subaltern (temporary Junior Commander) Winifred Enid Lillian Lawrie (211300), Auxiliary Territorial Service.
- No. 7584592 Warrant Officer Class I Sub-Conductor Henry Leach, Royal Army Ordnance Corps.
- No. 7584612 Warrant Officer Class I Sub-Conductor George Ledwidge, Royal Army Ordnance Corps.
- Major Phillip Charles James Leigh, Hampshire Home Guard.
- Major Arthur Wilfred Lewis, Fiji Labour Corps.
- Major William Nathaniel Lindley, Coventry Home Guard.
- Lieutenant John Lindsay, Renfrewshire Home Guard.
- Captain (temporary Major) Alexander Godfrey Macdonald (39284), The Queen's Own Cameron Highlanders (Territorial Army, Reserve of Officers).
- Captain (Quartermaster) Colin Robert Mackay (89106), The Royal Scots (The Royal Regiment).
- Lieutenant (temporary Captain) William Gold Mackay (185450), Royal Army Service Corps.
- Captain (temporary Major) Ian Stuart Gruinard Mackenzie (74300), Royal Corps of Signals (Supplementary Reserve).
- Lieutenant (temporary Captain) Wilfred Manners (64097), Royal Corps of Signals (Supplementary Reserve).
- No. 1060858 Warrant Officer Class I Regimental Sergeant-Major Jack Mansfield, Royal Horse Artillery.
- Major Edward Alfred Geoffrey Marlar, Staffordshire Home Guard.
- Captain (temporary Major) Henry Roy Marsh (5602), Queen's Own Royal Staffordshire Yeomanry, Royal Armoured Corps.
- Lieutenant William Alfred Marshall, Royal Indian Army Service Corps.
- Captain Harry Matthews, Devon Home Guard.
- No. 5239458 Warrant Officer Class I Regimental Quartermaster Sergeant John Mayne, The Royal Berkshire Regiment (Princess Charlotte of Wales's).
- Captain (temporary Major) Maxwell Hyslop Maxwell (89949), Royal Artillery (Territorial Army).
- Major (temporary Lieutenant-Colonel) Louis Henry McCausland (119821), Royal Army Ordnance Corps.
- No. 5329816 Regimental Sergeant Major Leslie Thomas McColm, The Royal Berkshire Regiment (Princess Charlotte of Wales's).
- Captain (temporary Major) Bernard McCormick, MIEE, (141161), Royal Engineers.
- Captain (temporary Major) William Laing McGregor (121066), The Black Watch (Royal Highland Regiment).
- Subaltern (temporary Junior Commander) Gwendolin Drummond McKerrow, Auxiliary Territorial Service.
- Major John Minchin, Derbyshire Home Guard.
- Captain (Quartermaster) Ronald Charles Eric Mines (77372), The Queen's Own Royal West Kent Regiment.
- Captain (temporary Major) Robert Calder Moles (108730), Royal Artillery.
- Captain (Brevet Major) (temporary Major) (local Lieutenant-Colonel) Arthur Rupert Moxsy, MC, (8654), The Royal Inniskilling Fusiliers.
- Risaldar (acting Risaldar Major) Niaz Muhammad, Indian Armoured Corps, Indian Army.
- Lieutenant (Assistant Commissary) James Wildgoose Murdoch, Indian Army Corps of Clerks.
- Major James Broadfoot Murray, Glasgow Home Guard.
- Captain (temporary Major) Daniel Alfred Norton, MC, (145801), Royal Artillery.
- Captain Edwin Frederick Nott, Hertfordshire Home Guard.
- Captain (temporary Major) Michael Whittaker Carlton Oldfield, MB, FRCS, (44832), Royal Army Medical Corps, Territorial Army.
- No. 1525944 Warrant Officer Class II Battery Sergeant Major John Oliver, Royal Artillery.
- No. 6930 Warrant Officer Class I Regimental Sergeant Major Anderea Opio, The King's African Rifles.
- Lieutenant (temporary Captain) Charles Edward Page (193565), Royal Corps of Signals.
- Lieutenant (temporary Captain) Richard Bentley Howard Page (217062), Royal Artillery.
- No. 1055245 Warrant Officer Class I Regimental Sergeant Major George William Parritt, Royal Artillery.
- Lieutenant Dillwyn David Llewellyn Parry (77302), Royal Engineers (Territorial Army).
- Captain (temporary Major) Frank Frederick Seymour Passmore (118661), Pioneer Corps.
- Captain (Quartermaster) Thomas William Perkins (137607), Royal Artillery.
- Lieutenant David John Petty (188478), Royal Engineers.
- Captain (Quartermaster) Herbert Robert Pillinger (106161), Royal Corps of Signals.
- Captain (Quartermaster) John Pincombe (161172), Royal Artillery.
- Junior Commander (temporary Senior Commander) Minnie Helen Pine (192780), Auxiliary Territorial Service.
- Major Arthur Pond, Cornwall Home Guard.
- Captain (Quartermaster) Ernest Herbert Price (161174), Royal Tank Regiment, Royal Armoured Corps.
- Captain (Quartermaster) Alexander Robert Pride (87083), Royal Army Service Corps.
- Major Cyril Henry Wallace Pugh, Shropshire Home Guard.
- Senior Commander Kathlyn Gertrude Putnam, Women's Auxiliary Corps (India).
- Captain (temporary Major) Adrian Patrick Quaife (106858), Royal Engineers.
- Captain (Quartermaster) James Quinn (111593), Scots Guards.
- Captain (Quartermaster) Percy William Ransley (105988), The Buffs (Royal East Kent Regiment).
- No. 29741 Warrant Officer Class II, Company Sergeant Major Ruby Elizabeth Relf, Auxiliary Territorial Service.
- Captain (temporary Major) William Rennie (109358), The Lincolnshire Regiment.
- Captain (temporary Major) William James Riddell (205926), General List.
- Captain (temporary Major) James Alexander Rowland Robertson, 6th Gurkha Rifles, Indian Army.
- Major (temporary Lieutenant-Colonel) Edward Augustus Rodrigues, Indian Army Ordnance Corps.
- Lieutenant (acting Captain) Alan Stuart Roger, 6th Rajputana Rifles, Indian Army.
- Captain (temporary Major) Henry Joseph Rothwell (100045), The Devonshire Regiment.
- Captain (temporary Major) George William Henry Ryland, FRIBA, (107714), Royal Engineers.
- Captain (temporary Major) Elaine Margaret Catherine Salmond, MD, FRCS, (147752), Royal Army Medical Corps.
- No. 3849530 Warrant Officer Class II Battery Sergeant Major Charles Saunders, Royal Artillery (Territorial Army).
- No. 4741556 Warrant Officer Class I Staff Sergeant Major Herbert Mettham Saville, Royal Army Service Corps.
- Lieutenant (temporary Captain) Edward Thompson Scott, (214400), Royal Artillery.
- Captain (temporary Major) Harold Kyle Scott, BSc, AMInstCE, (185140), Royal Engineers.
- No. 2608107 Warrant Officer Class II Regimental Quartermaster Sergeant Thomas William Scott, Grenadier Guards.
- Captain (temporary Major) Linley Morton Seaborn (132729), Royal Artillery.
- Captain (temporary Major) Hugh Brougham Sedgfield (152559), Royal Electrical & Mechanical Engineers.
- Assistant Commandant Ivy Angela Seeley (588788), Voluntary Aid Detachment.
- Captain (temporary Major) Waqir Ali Shaikh, AMIME, Indian Army.
- Captain (temporary Major) Samuel George Maddox Shallard (59198234), Royal Artillery.
- Lieutenant (temporary Captain) William Tosh Sharpe (169612), Royal Engineers.
- Captain Willie Shaw, Wiltshire Home Guard.
- Captain (temporary Major) John James Sheppard, DSO, MC, (16659), The Middlesex Regiment (Duke of Cambridge's Own).
- Captain (temporary Major) William Bertram Sheppard (145459), Fife & Forfar Yeomanry, Royal Armoured Corps (Territorial Army).
- Captain Edward John Galpin Shorter, Berkshire Home Guard.
- Captain (temporary Major) Charles Rushton Shortt (29989), Royal Artillery, Territorial Army.
- Captain (Quartermaster) Charles William Silver (88782), The King's Shropshire Light Infantry, Territorial Army.
- Subadar Atma Singh, Indian Army Medical Corps.
- No. 1397283 Warrant Officer Class II Regimental Quartermaster Sergeant John Singleton, Royal Horse Artillery (Territorial Army).
- No. 7603236 Sub-Conductor Henry John Smart, Royal Army Ordnance Corps.
- No. 5721400 Warrant Officer Class I Regimental Sergeant-Major Herbert Smith, The Dorsetshire Regiment.
- Lieutenant (temporary Captain) John Smith (170097), Royal Artillery.
- No. 3854518 Warrant Officer Class II Battery Sergeant-Major John Smith, Royal Artillery.
- Major William Stanley Smith, TD, (7195), Territorial Army Reserve of Officers, The Cheshire Regiment.
- No. 4914034 Warrant Officer Class II Mechanist Quartermaster Sergeant William Henry Snell, The South Staffordshire Regiment.
- No. 7574783 Warrant Officer Class I Sergeant-Major Arthur Spalding, Royal Electrical & Mechanical Engineers.
- Captain (Quartermaster) John Edward Spooner (137694), The Devonshire Regiment.
- Captain (temporary Major) Francis Leslie Standage (103926), Royal Electrical & Mechanical Engineers.
- Captain (temporary Major) Kenneth Bridges Stanley (42519), Royal Armoured Corps.
- Lieutenant (Assistant Ordnance Mechanical Engineer) (temporary Captain) Henry Ernest Jack Steed, Indian Electrical & Mechanical Engineers.
- Captain (District Officer) W. Steel (152144), Royal Artillery.
- Captain (temporary Major) Douglas Stringfellow (135041), Royal Engineers.
- Major George Clifford Sugden, MC, East Riding Home Guard.
- Captain (Assistant Ordnance Mechanical Engineer) Thomas Heber Symonds, Indian Electrical & Mechanical Engineers.
- Lieutenant (temporary Captain, acting Major) Cecil Wortley Tait (185388), Intelligence Corps.
- Captain (temporary Major) Richard Colin Trevithick Tangye (105364), Intelligence Corps.
- Lieutenant Ernest Thomas James Tapp, Hampshire Home Guard.
- No. 6077881 Warrant Officer, Class I, Regimental Sergeant-Major Philip Tasker, The Queen's Royal Regiment (West Surrey).
- Captain (temporary Major) Frederick Hugh Thurnall Tatham (141454), The Royal Norfolk Regiment.
- Major Maurice Humphrey Taylor, Northumberland Home Guard.
- Senior Commander (temporary Chief Commander) Gladys Harriet Thompson (196016), Auxiliary Territorial Service.
- Major. (Quartermaster) Cecil Herbert Townsend, 8th Punjab Regiment, Indian Army.
- Captain (temporary Major) Leonard Eustace Upton (154262), Royal Engineers.
- Captain (temporary Major) Philip Copley Varley (42496), Royal Electrical & Mechanical Engineers.
- Captain (temporary Major) Stanley Robert Virgo (65763), Royal Corps of Signals.
- Lieutenant (acting Captain) Colin George Venables (127069), Royal Army Service Corps.
- No. 41087 Warrant Officer, Class II, Regimental Quartermaster Sergeant Ernest Vitel, The Middlesex Regiment (Duke of Cambridge's Own).
- Captain (temporary Major) Fakir Syed Waheed-ud-din, Indian Army.
- Chaplain the Reverend Thomas Walters, Indian Ecclesiastical Establishment, Indian Army.
- No. 773219 Warrant Officer, Class I, Regimental Sergeant Major John Cole Watson, Royal Artillery.
- Junior Commander (temporary Senior Commander) Ruth Watson (192912), Auxiliary Territorial Service.
- Major Sydney George Watson (45096), The Army Dental Corps.
- Captain (temporary Major) William Henry Cecil Wayte (119697), Royal Army Service Corps.
- Captain (temporary Major) John Westacott (118914), Royal Engineers.
- Captain (temporary Major) Arthur Leonard Wheeldon (106449), Royal Army Ordnance Corps.
- Major Christopher Probart Whitaker, Norfolk Home Guard.
- Captain (temporary Major) (Electrical & Mechanical Engineer 3rd Class) Henry George White (97571), Royal Electrical & Mechanical Engineers (Territorial Army).
- Captain (Quartermaster) (temporary Major) William Albert White (123522), Royal Artillery.
- Major Thomas MacFarlane Wilks, TD, (36338), Royal Corps of Signals (Territorial Army).
- Lieutenant Victor Norman Willard, Indian Engineers, Indian Army.
- Captain & Brevet Major (temporary Major) Frank Reuben Williams (19237), Reserve of Officers, The Lincolnshire Regiment.
- Captain (temporary Major) Philip Denys Wilson (70886), The Manchester Regiment, Territorial Army.
- Lieutenant Colonel William Wilson, Army Cadet Force (Middlesex).
- No. 4012 Company Sergeant Major Anne May Wren, Auxiliary Territorial Service.
- No. 6193751 Warrant Officer Class I Regimental Sergeant Major Albert Francis Wright, The Middlesex Regiment (Duke of Cambridge's Own).
- Major (Ordnance Executive Officer 1st Class) Edward Wyatt (40445), Royal Army Ordnance Corps.
- Major (temporary Lieutenant-Colonel) George John Arnold, Australian Imperial Forces.
- Captain Everett William Bowden, Australian Military Forces.
- Major Ronald Neale Herford, Australian Military Forces.
- Temporary Lieutenant Stanley Toohey, Australian Military Forces.
- Captain & Quartermaster William Charles Hastings, New Zealand Military Forces.
- Captain Reginald George Hayward, New Zealand Military Forces.
- Captain Ronald Kennedy, New Zealand Military Forces.
- Second Lieutenant Frederick Douglas Sheppard, New Zealand Military Forces.
- Captain Alfred John Steele, New Zealand Military Forces.
- Second Lieutenant Leonard Roy Taylor, New Zealand Military Forces, attached Fiji Labour Corps.

=== Royal Air Force ===
- Acting Squadron Leader George William Jordan (44582).
- Acting Squadron Leader Horace Tilzey (48163).
- Flight Lieutenant Thomas William Arthur Allen (47520).
- Flight Lieutenant Sanford Baker (Can/C.6697), Royal Canadian Air Force.
- Flight Lieutenant Stanley Woolgrove Bryant (110866), RAFVR.
- Flight Lieutenant Charles Christopher Cholmondeley (76363), RAFVR.
- Flight Lieutenant Wilfred Arthur Claydon (43514).
- Flight Lieutenant (now Acting Squadron Leader) Edward William Davis (46857).
- Flight Lieutenant James Roy Duncan (11261), RAFVR.
- Flight Lieutenant Rupert Ambrose Percy Fison (86945), RAFVR.
- Flight Lieutenant Charles Roderick Heazlewood (79114), RAFVR.
- Flight Lieutenants Michael Gilbert Tanner Hewlett (85823), RAFVR.
- Flight Lieutenant Arthur Ernest Kuring (Aus.267454), Royal Australian Air Force.
- Flight Lieutenant Richard Trevor Morison (82419), RAFVR.
- Flight Lieutenant John Parry (76080), RAFVR.
- Flight Lieutenant (now Acting Squadron Leader) Stuart Nelson Pike, DFC, (81847), RAFVR.
- Flight Lieutenant Douglas James Noel Rebbeck (48105).
- Flight Lieutenant William Henry Percival Smith (48276).
- Flight Lieutenant (now Acting Squadron Leader) Clive John Van Den Bergh (65425), RAFVR.
- Flight Lieutenant David Owen Williams (88588), RAFVR.
- Flight Lieutenant Albert James Wilson (Aus.3054), Royal Australian Air Force.
- Flight Lieutenant Percy Charles Wright (45393) Royal Air Force.
- Acting Flight Lieutenant Frederick Vernon Armstrong (49140).
- Acting Flight Lieutenant (now Acting Squadron Leader) Reginald Banks (62045), RAFVR.
- Acting Flight Lieutenant Frank William Burchell (66126), RAFVR.
- Acting Flight Lieutenant Miles Edward Milne Day (108483), RAFVR.
- Acting Flight Lieutenant William Sidney Dundas (112103), RAFVR.
- Acting Flight Lieutenant Arthur Evans (108356), RAFVR.
- Acting Flight Lieutenant (now Acting Squadron Leader) John Steward Geary (68071), RAFVR.
- Acting Flight Lieutenant Robert Girvan (124913), RAFVR.
- Acting Flight Lieutenant Harold John Griffiths (117180), RAFVR.
- Acting Flight Lieutenant William Clement Hawken (48576).
- Acting Flight Lieutenant Harold Holme (47561).
- Acting Flight Lieutenant (now Acting Squadron Leader) Henry Hansford Horsham (46052).
- Acting Flight Lieutenant Elfred Lewis Jones (137804), RAFVR.
- Acting Flight Lieutenant Walter Kilvington (106910), RAFVR.
- Acting Flight Lieutenant Charles William Layton (46159).
- Acting Flight Lieutenant Arthur Jesse Litchfield (104656), RAFVR.
- Acting Flight Lieutenant Alfred Edward Mitchell (46995).
- Acting Flight Lieutenant James William McCombie (46751).
- Acting Flight Lieutenant Leonard Martin Pankhurst (47022).
- Acting Flight Lieutenant George Perry (47711).
- Acting Flight Lieutenant Noel George Quenet (68274), RAFVR.
- Acting Flight Lieutenant Norman Radley (47682).
- Acting Flight Lieutenant Ronald Revill-Johnson (111355), RAFVR.
- Acting Flight Lieutenant Rawel Singh, Indian Air Force.
- Acting Flight Lieutenant Edwin Goodrich Thorpe (66621), RAFVR.
- Acting Flight Lieutenant Herbert Laurence Warner (101226), RAFVR.
- Acting Flight Lieutenant Frederick George Weston (48852).
- Acting Flight Lieutenant Cyril Thomas White (46972).
- Acting Flight Lieutenant David Chalmers Young (65665), RAFVR.
- Flying Officer Frank Frederick John Butler (49363).
- Flying Officer Geoffrey Martin Langdon Goodall (139289), RAFVR.
- Flying Officer Percival Frederick Hudson (50997).
- Flying Officer David Alexandra Inglis (63503), RAFVR.
- Flying Officer George Petrie Hay Munro (61141), RAFVR.
- Flying Officer John Padriac Weiffort Pollard (N.Z.403527), Royal New Zealand Air Force.
- Flying Officer Mansel Clifford Morris Vaughan (52132).
- Flying Officer Edward Donald Watkins (123269), RAFVR.
- Acting Flying Officer Frederic Thomas Johnson (639348), RAFVR.
- Warrant Officer William Arthur Thomas Anderson (165021).
- Warrant Officer Michael Berenson (Can/R.71560), Royal Canadian Air Force.
- Warrant Officer Stanley William Bryant (542644).
- Warrant Officer Charles Chandler (362887).
- Warrant Officer Harry Norman Chislett (346626).
- Warrant Officer John Edwin Cooper (560069).
- Warrant Officer William Crosland (349220).
- Warrant Officer James Duncan (333198).
- Warrant Officer Reginald Henry Barton Gamble (330222).
- Warrant Officer John Lester Jarvis (357046).
- Warrant Officer George Jefferson (202208).
- Warrant Officer Reuben Lee (506238).
- Warrant Officer Sidney Albert Lucksford (590820).
- Warrant Officer John Richard Macdonald (505053).
- Warrant Officer Francis Edward Ferryman (591016).
- Warrant Officer Thomas. Freemantle Russell (359171).
- Warrant Officer Edward Charles Simmens (509371).
- Warrant Officer Kenneth Smith (355383).
- Warrant Officer Victor Alwyn Stanley (515247).
- Warrant Officer Arthur Edward Stevens (364174).
- Warrant Officer Walter John Towner (347753).
- Warrant Officer Charles Edward Waite (343890).
- Warrant Officer Adam Ward (346495).
- Acting Warrant Officer Clinton Walter Kidby (366134).
- Acting Warrant Officer William Anthony McGilp (561825).
- Acting Flight Officer Nellie Mary Evans (3088), Women's Auxiliary Air Force.
- Acting Flight Officer Mary Hodgson (5581), Women's Auxiliary Air Force.
- Acting Flight Officer Barbara Pemberton (1888), Women's Auxiliary Air Force.
- Acting Flight Officer Gladys Mary Shadbolt (1071), Women's Auxiliary Air Force.
- Warrant Officer Constance McLaughlin (887452), Women's Auxiliary Air Force.
- Squadron Leader William Marsel Higgins, Royal Australian Air Force.
- Acting Squadron Leader Percy Victor Feltham, Royal Australian Air Force.
- Flight Lieutenant Arthur John Relf, Royal Australian Air Force.
- Flight Lieutenant James Bruce Dickey, Royal New Zealand Air Force.
- Acting Flight Lieutenant William John Fyfe, Royal New Zealand Air Force.

== Civil Division ==
- Captain Rowland Vincent Adams, Master, Merchant Navy.
- Lieutenant-Commander James Guthrie Adamson, Royal Navy (Retd), Production Manager, J. & E. Hall Ltd.
- Walter Stephen Aldhouse, Managing Director, Aldhouse, Milnes & Co.
- Charles Bailey Allerton, Head Master of Barnack Church of England School, Soke of Peterborough.
- James Anderson, Director, Andersons Ltd.
- Reginald James Atkinson, Lately Chief Sanitary Inspector, Surveyor and Architect Evesham Rural District Council.
- John Baker, MInstCE, Manager Joseph Booth, Brothers Ltd.
- Doris Mildred Ballard, Higher Clerical Officer, Export Credits Guarantee Department.
- Percy Barkes, Colliery Manager, Elemore Colliery, Durham.
- Joseph Barron, Superintendent and Deputy Chief Constable, Cumberland & Westmorland Constabulary.
- Evelyn Vida Baxter, Chairman, Women's Land Army Sub-Committee of the Agricultural Executive Committee for East Fife.
- Sidney Bays, AMInstI, Managing Director of the Port of Hull Road Transport Control Ltd.
- Else, Countess Beauchamp, County Organiser, Worcestershire, Women's Voluntary Services for Civil Defence.
- David Beedie, Chief Engineer Officer, Merchant Navy.
- Susan Henderson Begg, Clerical Officer, Department of Agriculture for Scotland.
- Barbara Sarah Birnie, Higher Executive Officer, Ministry of Labour & National Service.
- John Black, Honorary Publicity Officer for Special Savings Campaigns, Dunfermline.
- Lieutenant-Colonel William Blackwood, DSO, MB, ChB, County Commissioner, St. John Ambulance Brigade, Cornwall.
- Edward Michael Blake, Principal Clerk, Savings Bank Department, General Post Office.
- Edward Sedgwick Blanch, Superintendent, Welding and Fabricating Department, A. Reyrolle & Co. Ltd.
- Captain Laurence Samuel Boggs, Master, Merchant Navy.
- George Frederick Booth, Honorary Secretary, City Rifle Club.
- Benjamin Bert Bowles, Managing Director, Minty Ltd.
- Flight Lieutenant Cyril Boxhall, Education Officer, Royal Air Force Educational Service.
- Alfred Bradford, Rolling-Stock Controller, Carter Paterson & Co. Ltd, Sub-District Manager, Ministry of War Transport.
- Benjamin George Brame, Assistant Meteorological Office, Air Ministry.
- John Alfred Brazier, JP, Fire Guard Officer, Ryde.
- Frederick Mason Brewer, PhD, Chief Warden, Civil Defence Wardens' Service, and Fire Guard Officer, Oxford.
- Roland Hunter Briggs, Assistant Director, Censorship Division, Ministry of Information.
- Captain Hubert Stanford Broad, AFC, Chief Production Test Pilot, Hawker Aircraft Ltd.
- Alexander Brodie, Skipper of a Steam Trawler.
- Mary Brookfield, Deaconess, Church Army.
- Edmund Brown, Works Manager, Silley Cox & Co. Ltd.
- Hubert Reginald Harold Brown, Superintendent of Labour, Royal Ordnance Factory, Woolwich.
- May Grace Brown, Assistant District Officer, Assistance Board; lately Private Secretary to the Director-General of the Post Office.
- Arthur Charles Buckhurst, Deputy Fire Guard Officer, Fulham.
- Joseph Morley Bulman, Chief Engineer Officer, Merchant Navy.
- John Arthur Burtinshaw, Chief Steward, Merchant Navy.
- William Edmund Butlin, Managing Director, Butlin's Ltd.
- Abel Camp, Chief Superintendent, Hertfordshire County Constabulary.
- Captain Alexander Campbell, Master, Merchant Navy.
- Isobel Gardine Campbell, Clerical Officer, Office of the Minister Resident at Allied Force Headquarters, Mediterranean.
- James Campbell, Secretary, William Denny & Brothers Ltd.
- Albert Bernard Cape, AMIEE, Engineering Test Superintendent, General Electric Co. Ltd.
- Eric Thompson Carr, Honorary Secretary, Driffield Savings Committee.
- Alexander Carrol, Chief Engineer Officer, Merchant Navy.
- Herbert Prosser Chaffey, Chief Bookkeeper, United Kingdom Commercial Corporation.
- Councillor George William Chew, Air Raid Precautions Sub-Controller, Strood.
- George Moir Christie, Repair Engineering Manager, Henry Robb Ltd.
- Captain Gilbert Holgate Clark, Master, Merchant Navy.
- John Clark, Skipper of a Steam Drifter.
- Kathleen Clara Clark, Radiographer in Charge, Ilford Ltd. For services in connection with Mass Radiography.
- Ralph Woodrow Clark, Head Postmaster, Wellingborough, Northamptonshire.
- Kathleen Irene Clement, County Secretary for Northumberland, Women's Land Army.
- Frank Harold Cleobury, Assistant Director, Passport Control Department, Foreign Office.
- Mary Wilson McKay Cochrane, Assistant District Officer, Assistance Board.
- Andrew Watt Buchan Cockburn, Works Manager, Menzies & Co. Ltd.
- Emmanuel Cohen, Inspector (Insurance), Ministry of Health.
- Charles Edward Cook, Senior Executive Officer, War Damage Commission.
- Constance Louise Cooling, Chief Cashier and Paymaster, British Red Cross Society.
- Henry Christie Cooney, Purser, Merchant Navy.
- Captain Henry Edward Cooper, Regional Organiser, Birmingham, Blood Donor Service.
- Lieutenant-Commander William Percival Cooper, RNVR, Employed in a Department of the Foreign Office.
- Annie Isabel Cope, Chairman, Loughborough Street Groups Savings Committee.
- Frederick James Cornish, Chief Officer, Merchant Navy.
- Sydney Alfred Cowan, Chief Steward, Merchant Navy.
- Alexander Cathcart Coward, Chief Engineer Officer, Merchant Navy.
- John Edward Cowderoy, Development Superintendent (Road Transport), London Passenger Transport Board.
- Charles John Cowley, MC, DCM, Station Master, Crewe, London Midland & Scottish Railway Co.
- Reginald Ernest Cox, Liaison Officer, General Electric Co.
- William Ernest Crabb, Assistant Inspector of Schools, Board of Education.
- John Cherry Cree, Staff Officer, Air Ministry.
- Charles Horace Cunniffe, Manager, Baldwins Ltd.
- Eileen Cunningham, Matron, Great Yarmouth General Hospital. For services to Civil Defence.
- Tom Curr, JP, Divisional Warden and Commandant, Civil Defence Messenger Service, Edinburgh.
- Julie Daniell, Honorary Secretary, Southwark Division, Soldiers' Sailors' & Airmen's Families Association.
- Major Cyril Maurice Dansey, Civil Assistant, War Office.
- John Davidson, Staff Officer, Board of Inland Revenue.
- Thomas Davies, Works Superintendent, Laycock Engineering Co. Ltd.
- Kathleen Lucy Davis, Sister Radiographer, St. Mary's Hospital, Portsmouth.
- William Frederick Dawson, Higher Clerical Officer, Office of the Minister Resident in West Africa.
- William Henderson Denholm, MIMechE, MIPE, Regional Technical Officer, Scotland, Ministry of Labour & National Service.
- Councillor Hugh Alfred Clifford Dingle, Chairman, Eastbourne Savings Committee.
- Robert William Dobbing, BEM, Divisional Officer, No. 5 (London) Region, National Fire Service.
- Joan Sherwood Dodd, Head of Section, Ministry of Economic Warfare.
- William Robin Douglas, MM, Senior Contract Officer, Ministry of Aircraft Production.
- William Douglas Drysdale, Senior Temporary Assistant, Offices of the War Cabinet.
- Kenneth Dunn, Assistant Administrative Officer, Cavalry & Royal Armoured Corps Record Office, War Office.
- Samuel Herbert Dyer, Honorary Secretary, Beaconsfield Savings Committee.
- Harold Algernon Dymond, Food Executive Officer, Poole, Ministry of Food.
- Yolande, Lady Eddis, County Organiser, East Suffolk, Women's Voluntary Services for Civil Defence.
- Alfred Ellmers, Factor Manager, R. & J. Hill Ltd.
- William Thomas Elson, Assistant Production Manager, Gloster Aircraft Co. Ltd.
- Captain George Elvin, Port Officer, Ministry of War Transport.
- Charles Alfred Edward Ewin, Staff Officer, Board of Inland Revenue.
- Alexander Drysdale Falconer, Chief Officer, Merchant Navy.
- Kathleen Elizabeth Farrar, Senior Commandant, The American Ambulance, Great Britain.
- Alexander Fisher, Higher Clerical Officer, Department of Health for Scotland.
- Lizzie Fletcher, ARRC, Matron, the Queen Alexandra Hospital Home for Disabled Sailors & Soldiers.
- Isabella McKenzie Fordyce, Teacher, Leuchars Public School, Morayshire.
- George Frederick French, Governing Director, Thomas French & Sons Ltd.
- Frederick Basil Garner, ARCS, AIC, Head Master of Borough Polytechnic Junior Technical School for Boys.
- Clement Mervyn Gatley, Managing Director, London Colney Service Station.
- Thomas Leslie Milner Gibson, Assistant Director of Mechanization, Ministry of Supply.
- George William Giffin, Works Manager, Siemens Brothers & Co. Ltd.
- Joseph Arthur Gilbert, Departmental Chief Draughtsman and Designer, Rose Brothers Ltd.
- George Harrison Gilkes, Second Engineer Officer, Merchant Navy.
- Edmund Thomas Jean Gill, Senior Shipping Assistant, Ministry of War Transport.
- James Gillespie, First Electrician, Merchant Navy.
- Captain Dugald Gillies, Master, Merchant Navy.
- Charlie McGregor Gollan, Second Engineer Officer, Merchant Navy.
- James Joseph Goodson, MC, Deputy General Manager, Todd & Co. Ltd.
- Ernest John Greave, Victualling Store Officer and Deputy Superintendent of Royal Victoria Yard, Admiralty.
- Richard Thomas Gregory, Chief Superintendent of Traffic, London Telecommunications Region, General Post Office.
- Richard Henry Griffith, Second Engineer Officer, Merchant Navy.
- Robert Charles Grimwade, Works Director, Holbrook Machine Tool Co. Ltd.
- Ronald Harry Hacker, Managing Director, Dynatron Radio Ltd.
- Squadron Leader James Douglas Haddon, Education Officer, Royal Air Force Educational Service, Technical Training Command.
- James Hadfield, Technical Manager, Beyer, Peacock & Co. Ltd.
- John Thomas Hales, Superintendent, Head Post Office, Hastings.
- Frederick Hall, Works Manager, The Superheater Co. Ltd.
- Flight Captain James Smith Halliday, Air Transport Auxiliary.
- Geoffrey Herbert Halton, Assistant to Managing Director, Steatite & Porcelain Products Ltd.
- Captain Bertram Hancock, Master, Merchant Navy.
- Frederick Henry Hand, Secretary, National Council of the Pottery Industry.
- William George Harding, Gyroscopical Engineer, The Sperry Gyroscope Co.
- Phyllis Helena Hartnett, Administrative Assistant, United Kingdom Treasury Delegation, Washington.
- Charles Stephen Harwood, Senior Inspector, Inspectorate of Stores, Ministry of Supply.
- James Haveron, Second Officer, Merchant Navy.
- Amelia Vaughan Hayman, JP, Vice-Chairman of the Civilian Welfare Committee for West Cornwall. For services to Civil Defence.
- Reginald Granville Payne Helbing, Works Manager, Standard Telephones & Cables Ltd.
- Alexander Henshaw, Chief Test Pilot, Vickers-Armstrongs Ltd.
- Michael Leo Hernan, Chief Officer, Merchant Navy.
- Norman Heselton, Chief Officer, Merchant Navy.
- Christian Erskine Hill, Commandant, Women's Auxiliary Police Force, Edinburgh.
- David Charles Gershom Hillyard, Shipbuilder, Sussex.
- Kathleen Rosemary Corry Hodgson, Regional Officer, Women's Land Army.
- Ashlin Hodson, Director, Metal Closures Ltd, and Superintendent in an Ordnance Factory.
- Frederick James Vernon Holmes, AFRAeS, Works Manager, Airports Ltd.
- Emily Hopkins, Chief Superintendent of Typists, Ministry of Agriculture & Fisheries.
- Albert George Howe, Chief Diesel Engineer, Davey Paxman & Co. Ltd.
- Arthur Edward Howell, Senior Executive Officer, Board of Customs & Excise.
- Alexander Huey, Radio Officer, Merchant Navy.
- Arthur John Humphreys, Chief Purser, Merchant Navy.
- John Joseph Hutchinson, Assistant Manager, Vickers-Armstrongs Ltd.
- Hilda Margaret Hyatt, Assistant Director, Molasses & Industrial Alcohol Control, Ministry of Supply.
- Harry Hymas, Departmental Manager, Hoffman Manufacturing Co. Ltd.
- Demetrios Inglessis, Chief Accountant, Middle East Refugee & Relief Administration, Office of the Minister Resident in the Middle East.
- Captain Joseph Henry Irons, MC, Chief Civil Defence Warden and Welfare Officer, Huddersfield.
- Tabitha Irene James, Nursing Sister, the County Sanatorium, Chard.
- Major Frederick John Jempson, Employed in a Department of the Foreign Office.
- Albert Henry Jones, Assistant to Manager, Home Institutes Service, Navy, Army & Air Force Institutes.
- Alfred Benjamin Jones, Civil Assistant and Accountant, Ministry of Aircraft Production Research Establishment.
- Charles James Jones, Materials Officer, Electrical Industry Export Groups.
- Ernest James Henry Jones, Works Manager, Associated Equipment Co. Ltd.
- John Banks Keatinge, Manager, Clyde District, Chadburns Ship-Telegraph Co. Ltd.
- Austin Kelly, Naval Architect, Vickers-Armstrongs Ltd.
- Captain John Kennedy, Master, Merchant Navy.
- John Dunlop Kerr, Manager and Secretary, St. Andrew's Engineering & Shipwright Co. Ltd.
- Geoffrey King, Honorary Secretary, Nottingham War Finance Campaign Committee.
- Thomas Hilary Kinman, AMIEE, Head of Radio Section, Research Laboratory, British Thomson Houston Co. Ltd.
- Doris Adele Kirby, Higher Clerical Officer, Ministry of Aircraft Production.
- Ernest Alfred Knighton, Civilian Officer, War Office.
- Observer Commander Charles Alfred Lakin, Group Commandant, Royal Observer Corps.
- Norman Gerald Lancaster. For services to the Ministry of Production and to the Air Training Corps in Warwickshire.
- Sidney Herbert Lancaster, Manager of the Ministry of Labour & National Service Employment Exchange, Shepherd's Bush.
- Ethel Muriel Land, Assistant Matron, Middlesex Hospital.
- Alfred Robins Langford, Distribution Superintendent, Plymouth & Stonehouse Gas Light & Coke Co.
- Herbert Allan Guy Langton, Chief Warden, Civil Defence Wardens' Service, Bootle.
- William James Laughton, Assistant Constructor, Department of the Director of Naval Construction, Admiralty.
- Captain Alan Layfield, MC, Commandant, Special Constabulary, Birkenhead.
- Joseph Lesford, MIMechE, MIAE, Assistant to the Director of Vehicle Maintenance, Ministry of War Transport.
- Forbes William Leslie, Deputy Chief Constable, West Lothian Constabulary.
- Herbert Cecil Lewis, Regional Commissioner for National Savings, North Western Region (Lancashire & Cheshire), National Savings Committee.
- John Liddell, Chief Assistant to the Town Clerk and Deputy Air Raid Precautions Controller, Greenock.
- Edith Beatrice Liddle, Clerical Officer, Office of HM Procurator General & Treasury Solicitor.
- Isaac Lipman, Manager E. K. Cole Ltd.
- Ethel Lister, County Borough Organiser, Grimsby, Women's Voluntary Services for Civil Defence.
- Harold David Little, DCM, Chief Clerk, Territorial Army Association, Shropshire.
- Mary Silvani Liversidge, Centre Organiser, Dewsbury, Women's Voluntary Services for Civil Defence.
- Ivor Paul Llewellyn, MIChemE, JP, Director, Peter Spence & Sons Ltd.
- Vera Kathleen Lorimer, Vice-Chairman, Victoria Station Forces Canteen & Hostel, Manchester.
- Dorothy Marian Love, Honorary Secretary, Queen's Own Royal West Kent Regiment Prisoners of War & Comforts Fund.
- Charles Scott Low, Chief Officer, Merchant Navy.
- Andrew McAdam, Chief Engineer Officer, Merchant Navy.
- Thomas Alexander McAllister, Column Officer, Northern Ireland, National Fire Service.
- Dugald McCallum, Secretary and Cashier, Charles Connell & Co. Ltd.
- David McCulloch, Agricultural Editor, Aberdeen Press & Journal.
- Eleanor Catherine Macdonald, Assistant Censor, Postal & Telegraph Censorship Department, Ministry of Information.
- Sara Howard McFadyen, JP. For public services in Stirlingshire.
- James McKenzie, lately Secretary and Registrar of Robert Gordon's Colleges, Aberdeen.
- Observer Commander John Ord Alistair Fraser Mackenzie, Group Commandant, Royal Observer Corps.
- Malcolm Beaton Macrae, Head Master of Church Street Public School, Glasgow.
- William Leopold Manning, Fire Guard Officer, Colchester.
- Arthur Marshall, Assistant Director of Emergency Works & Recovery, Ministry of Works.
- Frederick Herbert Marshall, Assistant London District Freight Superintendent, Southern Railway Co.
- William George Martin, Honorary Secretary, Milford Haven Savings Committee.
- George Hill Maxwell, Acting Higher Executive Officer (Accounts), Ministry of Economic Warfare.
- Marjorie Florence Mayo, Controller of Typists, Air Ministry.
- Henry Edward Millbank, Superintending Clerk, General Register Office, Ministry of Health.
- Horace William Minshull, Senior Executive Officer, Foreign Office.
- Catharine Helen Scott Moncrieff, Organising Secretary with the Forces in Scotland, Young Women's Christian Association.
- Samuel Montgomery, Second Engineer Officer, Merchant Navy.
- Percy Fred Moore, Steward, Class I, HM Prison, Wormwood Scrubbs.
- William John Moore, Honorary Secretary, Swansea Squadron, Air Training Corps.
- Esca Mary Nugent Mortimer, Higher Clerical Officer, Foreign Office.
- John Murray, Skipper of the Admiralty steam trawler Loon.
- Jessie Nairn, Honorary Secretary, Stirling High School Savings Group.
- Edith Napier, Staff Officer, Cabinet Secretariat, Northern Ireland.
- Joseph Albert Stuart Naylor, Staff Officer, Ministry of Commerce, Northern Ireland.
- Theodore Neilsen, Skipper of a fishing vessel.
- Winifred Annie Nightingale, Head Mistress of Kingsbury Green Senior Girls' School.
- Major Arthur Petrie Noble, Administrative Welfare Officer, Western Command.
- Frederick Thomas Nurrish, Director, Geo. Bray & Co. Ltd.
- Charles Henry Benjamin Oakley, Chief Technical Superintendent, Ordnance Survey.
- Margaret Bennett O'Callaghan, Voluntary Welfare Worker, RAF Hospital Ely.
- Theodore Oshigin, Third Engineer Officer, Merchant Navy.
- Hector Leslie Oura, MIEE, Assistant Superintendent, Designs & Development Department, Gramophone Co. Ltd.
- Charles Paul Oxley, Chief Billeting Officer, Weston-super-Mare.
- Harold Bernard Parr, Managing Director, Slack & Parr Ltd.
- Harold Miller Pattinson, Branch Manager, Royal Insurance Co. Ltd.
- Frederick Clarkson Peacock, Chief Engineer Officer, Merchant Navy.
- George Hastings Peck, Divisional Superintendent, Grimsby, London & North Eastern Railway Company Police.
- James Mortimer Peddie, Honorary Secretary, Hull & District Local Information Committee.
- Elizabeth Alice Thompson-Pegge, Centre Organiser, Scarborough, Women's Voluntary Services for Civil Defence.
- Richard Henry Petherick, Goods Agent, Bricklayers' Arms Station, Southern Railway Co.
- Alfred George Petley, Printing Works Manager, HM Stationery Office.
- Herbert Edgar Scott Pilcher, Assistant Chief Controller of Supplies, Navy, Army & Air Force Institutes.
- Phyllis Kathleen Hughes Preedy, Head Mistress of Arne Stoborough Church of England School, Dorset.
- Frank George Price, Principal Clerk, Ministry of Pensions.
- Joan Suzanne Prichard, Assistant Divisional Food Officer, South Wales Division, Ministry of Food.
- James Edwin Pringle, Clerk Assistant to the Editor of Revised Statutes.
- Francis Egerton Procter, MIEE, Assistant to the Regional Controller, London Region, Ministry of Fuel & Power.
- Lena Radford, Regional Woman Fire Officer, No. 3 (Nottingham) Region, National Fire Service.
- Maymie Boyd Ramsay, Honorary Secretary, Officers' Club, Belfast.
- Henry Alexander Redpath, Assistant Controller and Secretary of the Northern Regional Board, Ministry of Production.
- Leonard Albert Rhodes, AMInstCE, Deputy Engineer, River Severn Catchment Board.
- Lilian Richards, Chief Woman Officer, South Wales & Monmouthshire Council of Social Service.
- George William Richmond, AMIMechE, Assistant Engineer Inspector, Admiralty.
- Mary McLeod Robertson, Charge Nurse, Royal Scottish National Institution, Larbert.
- Robert Robertson, Senior Staff Officer, War Office.
- Frederick Chetham Robinson, Manager, A. C. Cossor Ltd.
- William James Roddan, Engineering Manager, Dock Department, Fairfield Shipbuilding & Engineering Co. Ltd.
- Arthur Rowland Rodway, London Regional Manager, Petroleum Board.
- Yetta Rosenthal, Probation Officer, London.
- Albinia Ivy Ross, Divisional Director, Westminster, British Red Cross Society.
- Alfred Theodore Ruby, Senior Staff Officer, Board of Trade.
- James Stone Saunders, Manager, Randolph Colliery, Dysart, Fifeshire.
- James Saunderson, Chief Engineer Officer, Merchant Navy.
- Frank Walter Sceats, Chief Inspector, Telephone Manager's Office, Gloucester, General Post Office.
- Cyril Mosley Schofield, Second Officer, Merchant Navy.
- Captain Charles Logan Sclanders, Master, Merchant Navy.
- Frederick Scott, Air Raid Precautions Officer, North Eastern Electric Supply Co., Newcastle upon Tyne.
- Philip Leslie Scott, Secretary, London Regional Canal Committee.
- Edgar Shaw, Second Engineer Officer, Merchant Navy.
- George Harold Simpson, Manager, North Celymen Colliery, South Wales.
- Henry Ernest Slawson, Managing Director, Melbourne Engineering Co. Ltd.
- Alfred Smith, JP, Miners' Agent, Yorkshire.
- Catherine Squarey Weld-Smith, Administrative Assistant, War Office.
- Dorothy Vincent Smith, Centre Organiser, Paddington, Women's Voluntary Services for Civil Defence.
- John Smith, Chief Steward, Merchant Navy.
- Thomas Gillman Gordon-Smith, Divisional Officer, No. 37 (London) Fire Force, National Fire Service.
- William James Smith, Secretary, National Gas Council.
- William Turner Smith, Managing Director, Alexander Hall & Co. Ltd.
- Thomas Souness, Assistant Secretary, West India Committee.
- John Chawner Spicer, Accountant, Board of Customs & Excise.
- Helen Standring, MD, DPH, Senior Assistant Medical Officer of Health at Hull for Maternity and Child Welfare. For services to Civil Defence.
- Ernest Walter Starkey, Director, Charles H. Pugh Ltd.
- Hannah Mary Grace Starr, Staff Officer, Ministry of Home Security, seconded to Headquarters, Women's Voluntary Services for Civil Defence.
- Leslie Steains, JP, Chairman, Sale Savings Committee.
- Eleanor Stewart, JP, Chairman of the Women's Sub-Committee of the Central Glasgow Local Employment Committee.
- George Stewart, JP, Member of the Board of Visitors to Belfast Convict Prison.
- David Storrier, Superintendent, Metropolitan Police.
- Frederick Bertram Ralph Stutchbury, First Refrigerating Engineer Officer, Merchant Navy.
- Richard Swift, Chief Steward, Merchant Navy.
- James Henry Tarrant, Secretary, Bath Trades Council.
- Ida Ruth Taylor, Chairman, Mental Hospital Matrons' Association Matron, Kent County Mental Hospital, Chartham.
- Sidney Taylor, FSAA, Honorary Secretary, Smethwick Savings Committee.
- Major Oskar Teichman, DSO, MC, TD, Local Army Welfare Officer, Southern Command.
- Walter John Terry, AMIMechE, Assistant Director, Weapons Production, Ministry of Supply.
- William Charles Tingey, General Manager, Dispersal Factories, Dubilier Condenser Co. (1925) Ltd.
- Herbert Hunking Tozer, Senior Superintendent, Saunders Roe Ltd.
- Thomas Trotter, Second Engineer Officer, Merchant Navy.
- Freda Harriet Alicia Turner, County Secretary and Assistant County Director, Surrey Branch, British Red Cross Society.
- Herbert Alfred Turner, Constructor, Admiralty.
- Ralph Turner, Chief Engineer Officer, Merchant Navy.
- Thomas Sidney Turnham, Senior Staff Officer, Home Office.
- Ethel Margaret Tyndale, Honorary Secretary, York Division, Soldiers', Sailors' & Airmen's Families Association.
- Alan McPherson Urquhart, General Manager, Roath Engineering Co. Ltd.
- Arthur Venner, Senior Technical Officer, Ministry of Aircraft Production.
- Victor Harold Vernon, Chief Clerk, Headquarters, Scottish Command.
- Pearl Edith Wadham, Personal Secretary to the Divisional General Manager (Southern Area), London & North Eastern Railway Co.
- Lawrence Walker, Secretary, Director and General Manager, Rego Clothiers Ltd.
- Gwendoline Nita Wallace, Lady District Superintendent, Northern Ireland, St. John Ambulance Brigade.
- James Walmsley, Manager, Cosmos Manufacturing Co. Ltd.
- Captain Alexander Walsh, Master, Merchant Navy.
- Walter Emerson Waterworth, Chairman, Council of Voluntary War Work, and Organising Secretary, YMCA, Middle East.
- Margaret Isobel Watkins, Commander, The American Ambulance, Great Britain.
- Major Charles Lisle Watson, Local Army Welfare Officer, County of London.
- Arthur Charles Scott Warner, Chief Engineer Officer, Merchant Navy.
- James Weedy, Works Manager, de Havilland Aircraft Co. Ltd.
- Hyman Weinberg, Managing Director, J. Weinberg & Sons (1927) Ltd.
- Violet Laura Welldon, Commandant, Hampshire 12th Voluntary Aid Detachment, British Red Cross Society. For services to Civil Defence in Portsmouth.
- Stanley Spencer West, Development Physicist, Cinema-Television Ltd.
- William Wharton, Technical Director, Jack Olding & Co. Ltd.
- Archibald Lister White, Chief Draughtsman, Palmers Hebburn Co. Ltd.
- Erne White, Honorary Secretary of the Scottish Association for the Adoption of Children.
- Harry Perchard Whitley, Manager, Mountstuart Dry Docks Ltd.
- George Walter Thomas Whur, Skipper of a Steam Trawler.
- Amy Wilding, Sister Tutor, Coventry & Warwickshire Hospital.
- Bertha Wilkinson, Matron, Westwood Park Public Assistance Institution, Oldham.
- Emily Matilda Williams, Higher Executive Officer, India Office.
- William Frederick Willis, Chief Officer, Merchant Navy.
- James Wilson, Technical Manager, Barclay Curie & Co. Ltd.
- Swinburn Gibson Wilson. For public services in Newcastle upon Tyne.
- Winifred Mary Wilson, Senior Organising Supervisor, British Broadcasting Corporation.
- Gerald Owen Wiltshire, Honorary Organising Secretary and Treasurer, Bristol, Soldiers', Sailors', & Airmen's Help Society.
- Albert Edward Wood, Manager of a branch of B.S.A. Guns Ltd.
- Stanley Percival Woodley, Resident Manager, Vickers-Armstrongs Ltd.
- Charles Edgar Woodward, MC, Manager, Thoresby Colliery of the Bolsover Colliery Co. Ltd.
- Arthur John Woolcott, Deputy Managing Director, Wellworthy Piston Rings Ltd.
- Ernest James Henry Wright, Newsreel Camera Operator, Paramount News.
- Kathleen Wright, Head of the Welfare Comforts Department, East Lancashire.
- James Young, Clerk in the General Manager's Office, Clyde Navigation Trust.
- Leslie Claud Seton Barber, Commercial Secretary in His Majesty's Legation at Stockholm.
- Henrietta Irene Barry, Shorthand-Typist in His Majesty's Embassy at Chungking.
- Jeanie Bayne, British subject resident in Brazil.
- Hardie Raoul Blair, British Pro-Consul at Adana.
- James Arthur Brannen, British Vice-Consul at Boston.
- The Reverend Harold Wilfred Cummin, Honorary Chaplain at Algiers.
- Captain Henry Daniel, British subject resident in Uruguay.
- Sophia Mary Denison, British subject resident in Morocco.
- Athelstan John Garratt, British subject resident in the Argentine Republic.
- Margaret Jebb Scott, British subject resident in Switzerland.
- Arthur Lovelace, British Vice-Consul at Gijon.
- William Edward Devereux Massey, Archivist of His Majesty's Legation at Stockholm.
- Leonard Walter Nye, Chief Medical Supplies Officer, Sudan Medical Service.
- Maud Emily Scoffield, British subject resident in the Argentine Republic.
- Samuel Horatio Whyte, British subject resident in Panama.
- John George William Baggott, a member of the staff of the High Commissioner for Southern Rhodesia in London, Welfare Officer for Southern Rhodesian service men in the United Kingdom.
- William Coulthard, a Member of the District Council of Angaston, State of South Australia.
- Daniel Scott Jackson Dunn, Honorary Secretary and Treasurer, West of Scotland Branch, Empire Societies War Hospitality Committee.
- Garnet William Fulton. For services in connection with patriotic movements in the State of Tasmania.
- Pearl Hastwell. For voluntary services in connection with the Country Women's Canteen at Quorn under the auspices of the Country Women's Association of the State of South Australia.
- Captain Arthur Selwyn Hickman, Chief Superintendent, British South Africa Police.
- Marjorie Leaf, Secretary, Victoria League.
- Eleanor Mary MacGillivray. For social welfare and charitable work in Bulawayo, Southern Rhodesia.
- Harry David Mildenhall, MM, Controller of Stores, Bechuanaland Protectorate.
- Frank Rixom. For voluntary work in connection with the Services' Club in Salisbury, Southern Rhodesia.
- Honora Burke Ryan. For public and charitable services in Newfoundland.
- Horace Bertram White, Honorary Director of the Red Cross Bureau, State of Tasmania.
- Christina Beatrice Winter. For services in connection with philanthropic movements at Burnie, State of Tasmania.
- Margaret Mary Wyse, Assistant Organizing Secretary, Empire Rendezvous, Liverpool.
- Susan de Mierre, Civilian Deputy Assistant Censor, Bombay Censor Station.
- Helen Margaret Gebbett, Civilian Deputy Assistant Censor, Bombay Censor Station.
- Mary Gilmour Henry (wife of Mr. H. A. Henry, Grahams Trading Co., Karachi), Sind. For public services in Karachi.
- Alice Fenton, Lady Hood (wife of Sir Hugh Hood, KCIE, CSI, ICS, Adviser to His Excellency the Governor of Madras), Madras. For welfare services to the Forces.
- Cecily Elizabeth Arnold LaBouchardiere (wife of Mr. M. P. LaBouchardiere, Indian Police), Bombay. For services to European evacuees.
- Srirajah Rajarajeswaramma, Zamindarni of Telaprole, Kistna District, Madras.
- Mary Margaret Smith, Headmistress, British Army Children's School, Bangalore.
- Dorothy Ashley Ward, Honorary Secretary, Joint War Charities Depot, Madras.
- Phillip Francis Adams, Indian Civil Services, Sub-Divisional Officer, Mokokchung, Naga Hills, Assam.
- Khan Bahadur Sardar Mir Ahmad Khan, Extra Assistant Commissioner (Retd), Baluchisstan.
- Rai Bahadur Chaudhri Bans Gopal, Pleader, Karnal, Punjab.
- Khan Sahib Mir Bashar Khan, Executive Engineer and Deputy Secretary to Government, Public Works Department, North-West Frontier Province.
- Thomas George Brown, Officer Supervisor, Adjutant-General's Branch, General Headquarters, India.
- Frank Carman, Indian Police, Officer-in-Charge, A.R.P. Training Service, Calcutta, Bengal.
- Sardar Bahadur Charanjit Singh, Assistant Executive Engineer, North-Western Railway, Lahore.
- James Dickson Condie, lately Supervising Engineer in charge of construction of the Polish Refugee Camp, Kolhapur.
- Charles Thomas Cramphorn, Manager of the Lungla (Sylhet) Tea Estate, Karimpore, Assam.
- Timothy Leland Crosthwait, Indian Civil Service, Assistant Collector, Satara, Bombay, and lately Assistant Private Secretary to His Excellency the Viceroy.
- Rajkumar Shri Ajitsinhrao Ramrao Dafle, Member of the Jath State Executive Council, Jath.
- Arthur John Alexander Drake, DCM, Superintendent, Survey of India.
- Captain Allen Lancelot Austin Dredge, Indian Political Service, Assistant Political Agent and Colonization Officer, Nasirabad, Sibi District, Baluchistan.
- Jack Maurice Fenton, Executive Engineer, East Indian Railway, Lucknow.
- Captain Upton Charles Norman Finglas, Officer-in-Charge, Airship Base, Karachi Air Port.
- The Reverend Lowell Gatphoh, Member of the Assam Legislative Assembly, Jowai, Assam.
- William James Dawson Graham, in charge Burmah-Shell's Benzine (Motor & Aviation Spirit, Lubricants), Keamari, Karachi, Sind.
- Robert Hall Henry, Resident Engineer, Oudh & Tirhut Railway, Izatnagar.
- Charles Colin Glenn Hoyle, Head Engineer, His Majesty's Mint, Lahore.
- Edward Alfred Hughes, Superintendent Government Gardens, Lahore, Punjab.
- Major (Commissary) Alexander Neville Jameson, Military Engineering Service (Retd), Civil Assistant Garrison Engineer, Headquarters, Central Command.
- Major Albert John Jezzard, Accountant, Burma Refugee Organisation, Shillong, Assam.
- Shripatrao Balvantrao Junnarkar, Principal, N.E.D. Engineering College, Karachi.
- Captain Balraj Krishna Kapur, Indian Political Service, Settlement Officer, Kurram, North-West Frontier Province.
- Clarence Victor Kinsville, Deputy Controller of Supplies, United Provinces Circle, Department of Supply, Government of India.
- Pandit Rajnath Kunzru, Landlord, Agra, United Provinces.
- Raja Bahadur Kushal Pal Singh, Member of the Legislative Assembly (Central), Kotla, Agra District, United Provinces.
- George Ledwich, Chief Engineer, Messrs. Shaw Wallace & Co., and Superintendent, Technical Training Centre, Chandameta, Chhindwara District, Central Provinces & Berar.
- Charles Douglas Leitch, Manager, Gouripore Jute Mills, Naihati, 24-Parganas, Bengal.
- John Lewis Lethbridge, lately Secretary, Kamaran Quarantine Station.
- Komattil Govinda Menon, Indian Civil Service, Deputy Chief Controller of Exports, Government of India.
- Rai Bahadur Santosh Kumar Mukerji, MB, MRCP, Lecturer in Medicine, King Edward Medical School, Indore, Central India.
- Basanta Kumar Mukherjee, Magistrate and Collector, Pabna, Bengal.
- Ganpat Rai Nangea, Executive Engineer, Public Works Department, Buildings & Roads Branch, Punjab.
- Geoffrey Caton Ogilvie, Agent, India General Navigation & Railway Co. Ltd., Digha, Patna, Bihar.
- Kumbakonam Rangaswami Padmanabha Aiyangar, Indian Audit & Accounts Service, Under Secretary to the Government of India in the Finance Department.
- Lingaraj Panigrahi, Pleader and Public Prosecutor, Berhampur, Ganjam District, Orissa.
- Annepu Vasudeva Patro, Indian Police, District Superintendent of Police, Madras.
- Harry Emmanuel Potter, Assistant, Messrs. Richardson & Cruddas, Engineers, Byculla, Bombay.
- Moses Raymond Reuben, Food Grain Rationing Officer, Poona, Bombay.
- Sailesh Chandra Roy, Assistant Agricultural Commissioner with the Government of India.
- Rai Bahadur Lala Prabhu Dayal Seth, Member of the Lucknow Cantonment Board.
- 2nd Lieutenant (War Substantive Major) (Temporary Lieutenant-Colonel) Alexander Gregory Stavridi, Executive Engineer, East Indian Railway, Howrah.
- Rai Bahadur Dewan Sundar Das, Manager, Kapurthala Estates in Oudh, Bahraich, United Provinces.
- Abu Ashraf Mohammad Wajih, MRCS, LRCP, Chief Medical Officer, Emergency Hospitals & Medical Supplies, Bengal.
- Leonard Edward Walsh, Deputy Docks Manager, Officer on Special Duty, Bombay Port Trust, Bombay.
- Hubert Leo Weatherilt, Superintendent, Government Cattle Market, Hiranpur, and Honorary Assistant Recruiting Officer, Hiranpur, Santal Parganas, Bihar.
- William McKendree Wright, Indian Police, Assistant Director, Intelligence Bureau, Home Department, Government of India.
- Cyril Leonard Edwards, Burma Forest Service, Class II.
- Sulahuddin Abbas Shamsuddin Tyabji, lately Member of the House of Representatives, Burma.
- Beatrice Spencer Ajose. For social welfare services in Nigeria.
- Robert Perceval Armitage, Colonial Administrative Service, District Officer, Kenya.
- Evelyn Lily Bellamy. For services to education in the Gold Coast.
- Juda Leib Bloom, District Inspector of Jewish Schools, Palestine.
- Leila Charildos Cacoyanni. For public services in Cyprus.
- Merle Farland. For valuable services in the Western Pacific.
- Annie Smith Galbraith. For social welfare services in Ceylon.
- Joseph Vella Gera, 2nd Grade Clerk, Civil Service, Malta.
- Mary Ann Langdon Gummow, Colonial Nursing Service, Senior Nursing Sister, Nigeria.
- Eric Lindsay Hay, Colonial Agricultural Service, Agricultural Superintendent, Gold Coast.
- Enos Louis Jack, Manager, Agricultural Loan Societies Board, Jamaica.
- Harold Jordan, Instructor of Hygiene, Uganda.
- Someshwar Bechar Joshi, Principal, Government Indian Elementary School, Kenya.
- The Reverend Gerald Kenneth Lowe. For welfare services in the Falkland Islands.
- James Mackenzie, MM, Private Secretary to the Governor & Commander-in-Chief, Nyasaland.
- May Hickson-Mahony. Former President of the Women's Service League Tanganyika Territory. For services to war charities in that Territory.
- Ernest Dunstan Morgan. For public services in Sierra Leone.
- Raymond Norris, Secretary to Comptroller for Development and Welfare in the West Indies.
- Copeland Kenrick Robinson, Colonial Agricultural Service, Agricultural Superintendent, St. Vincent.
- Frank I'Anson Ryan. For services in connection with Civil Defence in Fiji.
- Dorothy Louise Byatt Scott, Senior Assistant Mistress, Kenya.
- Arthur Tom Shill, Colonial Customs Services, Customs Officer, Mauritius.
- Arthur St. George Tucker. For services to Education, Bermuda.
- Patricia Way. For Welfare Services, Aden.
- Fergus Brunswick Wilson, Colonial Agricultural Service, Agricultural Officer, Zanzibar.

== Honorary Members ==
- Audu dan Afoda, Chief of Makurdi and President of the Makurdi Mixed Court, Nigeria.
- Dr. Abraham Baruch, FRMS, Vice-Director, Herzlia Gymnasium, Tel Aviv, Palestine.
- Jacob Bergman, District Officer, Palestine.
- Ihsan Effendi Hashem, District Officer, Palestine.
- Sheikh Omar Souan, Senior Magistrate, Ramleh, Palestine.
- Muhammad Jama, Political Agent, Eastern Frontier, British Somaliland.
- Mahmoud Haji Ahamed, Headmaster, British Somaliland Schools.
