= Frederick Mason Brewer =

English chemist

Frederick Mason Brewer CBE FRIC (1903 – 11 February 1963) was an English chemist. He was Head of the Inorganic Chemistry Laboratory at the University of Oxford and Mayor of Oxford during 1959–60.

Frederick Brewer was born in Kensal Rise (aka Kensal Green), Middlesex, England. He was the son of Frederick Charles Brewer and Ellen Maria Owen, both school teachers. Brewer studied chemistry at Lincoln College, Oxford, from 1920, having received an open scholarship, and subsequently gained a first class degree. After his undergraduate studies, Brewer undertook research with Prof. Frederick Soddy.

Between 1925–7, Brewer was a Commonwealth Fund Fellow at Cornell University in the United States. During 1927–8, he was a lecturer in physical chemistry at the University of Reading. In 1928, he became a demonstrator and lecturer at the University of Oxford Inorganic Chemistry Laboratory. He stayed in Oxford for the remainder of his life. He became attached to St Catherine's Society in the 1930s. In 1955, he was appointed Reader in Inorganic Chemistry. When St Catherine's Society became St Catherine's College in 1962, he was appointed a Fellow of the College.

In 1944, Brewer was elected as a university member on Oxford City Council. In 1959, he was elected Mayor of Oxford for 1959–60. In 1961, he was appointed an Alderman of the council.

Brewer lived at 6 Moreton Road in North Oxford. He was a Fellow of the Royal Institute of Chemistry, and was appointed a Member of the Order of the British Empire (MBE) in the 1944 Birthday Honours, being promoted to Commander of the Order of the British Empire (CBE) in the 1963 New Year Honours. However, a week after collecting his CBE at Buckingham Palace, at the age of 60, he died at the Radcliffe Infirmary in Oxford. He was married with a son and a daughter.
