= James Riddell (skier) =

British skier and author (1909–2000)

W. James Riddell
- Born: 27 December 1909; Wandsworth, England
- Died: 2 February 2000 (aged 90); Hampshire, England
- Education: Clare College, Cambridge
- Occupations: Skier, olympian, author
- Spouse(s): Jeanette Kessler (m. 1959 - 1972), Alison Frances Jackson (m. 1973)
- Honours: MBE

W. James Riddell MBE (27 December 1909 – 2 February 2000) was a British champion skier and author who was involved in the early days of skiing as a competitive sport and holiday industry. Like his near contemporary, Sir Arnold Lunn, he matched his adventurism on the slopes and knowledge of the Alpine countries with an elegant record of his times.

== Skiing achievements ==
In 1929, he raced for Britain at Zakopane, Poland, in the first international downhill race, having got the reluctant backing of the International Ski Federation, and finished eighth among 60 racers. In the same year, he won the Kandahar Club's Muerren Inferno, still the longest and most demanding of amateur downhill races. He was British national champion in 1935 and vice-captain to Arnold Lunn's son, Peter, at the 1936 Winter Olympics at Garmisch-Partenkirchen.

He worked with Lunn and the Kandahar Ski Club to overcome Scandinavian objections to downhill-only skiing: they saw the sport being as much uphill as down. Finally, Alpine skiing was admitted at Garmisch, but only on the basis of combined results in downhill and slalom, a word coined by Lunn for a race with shorter, sharper turns through gates of twin poles.

Riddell was a winter sports polymath. In 1930, he had skied at 127.96 km an hour in the Flying Kilometre at St Moritz, and, moving over to its Olympic jump, vaulted nearly 50m. In the Garmisch Olympic downhill, which was part of the Olympic combined event, he crashed into a tree, catapulted into a river and badly injured his back.

== Education ==
Riddell was born in Wandsworth. Educated at Harrow School, he played cricket against Eton at Lord's and performed strongly for the cross-country team. At Clare College, Cambridge, he read modern languages, but took a year out to practise gorilla and cheetah photography in the Belgian Congo and Kenya, interspersed with writing children's books and publicity activities for De Havilland, Selfridges and Fortnum and Mason.

== Wartime and writing ==
During the Second World War, Riddell was based in Jerusalem and Syria, where he was a Political Officer in Homs. Having heard that the Australian Army was establishing a mountaineering school in Lebanon, he managed to get himself seconded to the Australian forces and he was appointed as Chief Instructor to what became the Middle East Ski and Mountaineering School at the Cedars of Lebanon above Beirut. After the attack on Pearl Harbor in December 1941 the Australians withdrew from Lebanon and Riddell became the Chief Instructor for the 9th Army on the same site, in 1942-1943 that became the Middle East Ski and Mountaineering School. His book "Dog in the Snow" provides an account of his time at the Ski School in Lebanon. He was awarded the MBE in the 1944 Birthday Honours for his work, teaching upwards of 20,000 soldiers the techniques of mountain mobility and survival. While working at the War Office, he was pasting cuttings for a snowcraft manual when he inadvertently pasted together the head of a dog on the body of a camel. From that came the idea of "split" books for children, a series published in many languages.

In 1948, with the writer Nevil Shute, he made a six-month flight to Australia and back in a single-engine Percival Proctor monoplane. From that experience, Riddell wrote a travel book, Flight of Fancy, and Shute the novel, A Town Like Alice. Riddell's 1957 book, The Ski Runs of Switzerland, was the first detailed guide to Swiss resorts, followed by a similar book on Austria the following year.

== Marriage; and further books ==
He married another former ski racer, Jeanette Kessler, in 1959, and their combined knowledge of the Alps resulted in a Penguin handbook, Ski Holidays in the Alps, a source book for many skiers and travel writers. In it, Riddell wrote: "You do it because, once you have tried it and taken to it, there is not any other game to compare with it in the world."

Riddell was president of the Ski Club of Great Britain, the Kandahar Club and the Alpine Ski Club in postwar years, and was awarded the Pery medal and Arnold Lunn medal while continuing his career as writer and traveller.

He gave up skiing in his 70s, though he often returned to Muerren, the Kandahar Club's Swiss Alpine headquarters, where he spent time painting watercolours. Although his eyesight was slowly failing, at his home near Ringwood, Hampshire, he worked on a unique ski stamp collection.

After the death of his first wife, he married Alison in 1973 and his daughter Jemma Jeannette was born in 1976. He died on 2 February 2000 aged 90.

== Rediscovering James Riddell ==
In 2009, James' wife, Alison Riddell, asked Antony Nasce to adapt one of his books, Animal Lore and Disorder, into an application for iPhone and iPod touch, some 60 years after its initial book release. In 2010, the sequel Hit or Myth was also converted into an App for sale on the iTunes Store. A second edition of his book "Dog in the Snow" was published in 2018 incorporating more information about the Lebanon Ski School and its staff along with previously unpublished photographs.

== Publications ==
- Animal Lore and Disorder (1947)
- Hit Or Myth: Family of Imaginary Beasts (1948)
- In The Forests of the Night (1948)
- Very Wild Life. An Unnatural History Book for First and Second Childhood (1948)
- Flight of Fancy (1950)
- Many, Many Times (1953)
- The Holy Land (1954)
- London in Colour – A Collection of Colour Photographs (With Notes by William Gaunt) (1955)
- African Wonderland (1956)
- Dog in The Snow (1957)
- The Ski Runs of Switzerland (1957)
- The Ski Runs of Austria (1958)
- Ski Holidays in the Alps (1961)
- Ski Lore and Disorder (1962)

== Sources ==
- Obituary in The Guardian newspaper
- James Riddell at Olympedia
