= Iseline Crivelli =

Italian alpine skier (1903–1988)

Personal information
- Nationality: Italian
- Born: 4 January 1903; Milan, Italy
- Died: 30 May 1988 (aged 85)

Sport
- Sport: Alpine skiing

Iseline Crivelli (4 January 1903 – 30 May 1988) was an Italian alpine skier. She competed in the women's combined event at the 1936 Winter Olympics.
