= Frida Clara =

Italian alpine skier (1909–1986)

Personal information
- Nationality: Italian
- Born: 6 January 1909
- Died: 18 January 1986 (aged 77)

Sport
- Sport: Alpine skiing

Frida Clara (6 January 1909 – 18 January 1986) was an Italian alpine skier. She competed in the women's combined event at the 1936 Winter Olympics.
