= Trude Möhwaldová =

Czech alpine skier

Personal information
- Nationality: Czech
- Born: 25 March 1915
- Died: 10 July 2002 (aged 87)

Sport
- Sport: Alpine skiing

Trude Möhwaldová (25 March 1915 – 10 July 2002) was a Czech alpine skier. She competed in the women's combined event at the 1936 Winter Olympics.
