= Hertha Rosmini =

Austrian alpine skier

Herta Rosmini
Personal information
- Nationality: Austrian
- Born: 9 November 1913; Vienna, Austria-Hungary

Sport
- Sport: Alpine skiing

Herta Rosmini (born 9 November 1913, date of death unknown) was an Austrian alpine skier. She competed in the women's combined event at the 1936 Winter Olympics.
