= Vello Kaaristo =

Estonian cross-country skier (1911–1965)

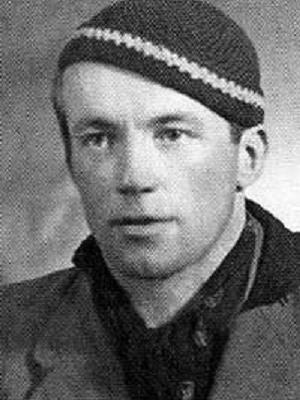
Vello Kaaristo in 1936

Vello Kaaristo (before 1936 Vassili Krassikov; 17 March 1911 in Narva – 14 August 1965) was the first Estonian cross-country skier to compete in the Olympics. At the 1936 Winter Olympics in Garmisch-Partenkirchen, he placed 30th in the 18 km event with a time of 1'25:11, and 23rd in the 50 km event with a time of 4'02:52.
