= Jeanette Kessler =

British alpine skier (1908–1972)

Medal record

Representing United Kingdom

Women's Alpine skiing

World Championship
Bronze medal – third place	1931 Mürren	Slalom
Bronze medal – third place	1933 Innsbruck	Combined

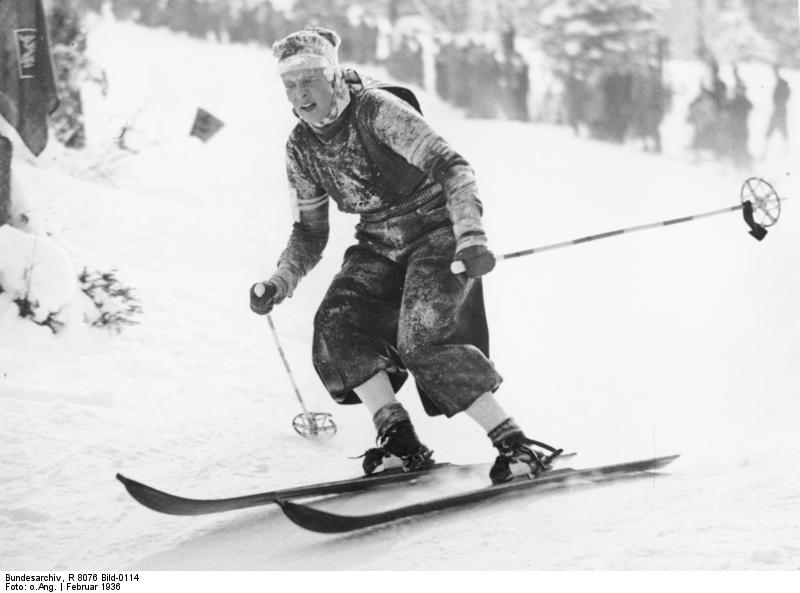
Kessler during the downhill race at the 1936 Winter Olympics

Jeanette Anne Kessler (4 October 1908 – 18 March 1972) was a British alpine skier who competed in the 1936 Winter Olympics. In 1936 she finished eighth in the alpine skiing combined event. She married James Riddell in 1959.
