= Käthe Lettner =

Austrian alpine skier

Personal information
- Nationality: Austrian
- Born: 13 December 1906; Bad Ischl, Austria-Hungary
- Died: 21 January 1982 (aged 75); Salzburg, Austria

Sport
- Sport: Alpine skiing

Käthe Lettner (13 December 1906 – 21 January 1982) was an Austrian alpine skier. She competed in the women's combined event at the 1936 Winter Olympics.
