= Birnie Duthie =

British alpine skier (1905–1994)

Personal information
- Nationality: British
- Born: 13 June 1905
- Died: 13 April 1994 (aged 88); Ashurst, Hampshire, England

Sport
- Sport: Alpine skiing

Birnie Duthie (13 June 1905 – 13 April 1994) was a British alpine skier. She competed in the women's combined event at the 1936 Winter Olympics.
