= Helen Blane =

British alpine skier (1913–2000)

Personal information
- Nationality: British
- Born: 5 September 1913; London, England
- Died: 12 April 2000 (aged 86); Surrey, England

Sport
- Sport: Alpine skiing

Helen Blane (5 September 1913 – 12 April 2000) was a British alpine skier. She competed in the women's combined event at the 1936 Winter Olympics.
