= Marion Miller =

Canadian alpine skier (1912–2005)

Personal information
- Born: 16 October 1912; Chester, Nova Scotia, Canada
- Died: 7 September 2005 (aged 92); Andover, Massachusetts, US

Sport
- Sport: Alpine skiing

Marion Miller (16 October 1912 – 7 September 2005) was a Canadian alpine skier. She competed in the women's combined event at the 1936 Winter Olympics.
