= Marcelle Bühler =

Swiss alpine skier (1913–2002)

Marcelle Bühler (6 August 1913 – 24 June 2002) was a Swiss alpine skier who competed in the 1936 Winter Olympics.

She was born in Uzwil.

In 1936, she finished tenth in the alpine skiing combined event.
