= Gratia Schimmelpenninck van der Oye =

Dutch alpine skier (1912–2012)

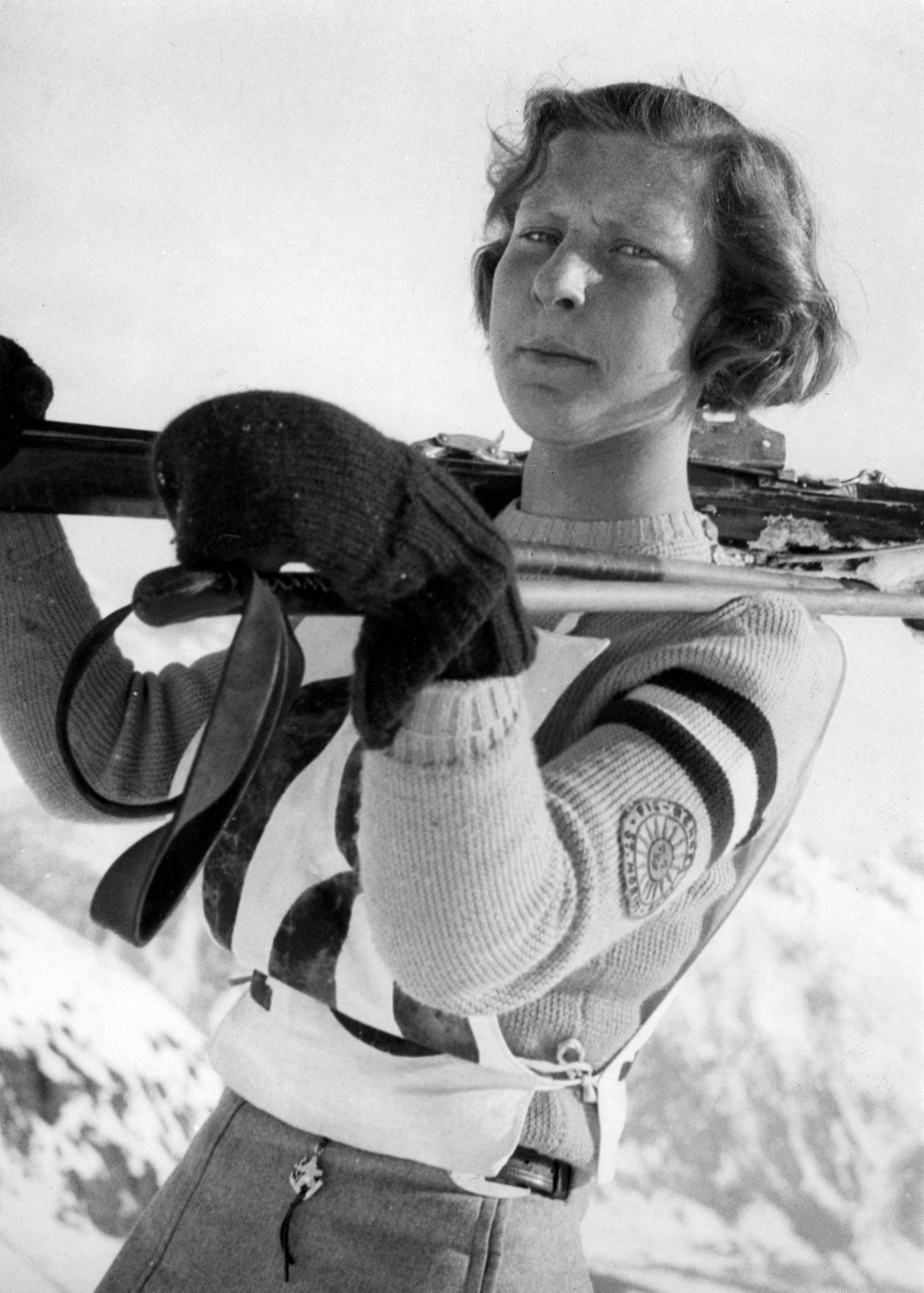
- Gratia Schimmelpenninck van der Oye in 1930

Personal information
- Born: 10 July 1912 Doorn, the Netherlands
- Died: 12 February 2012 (aged 99) The Hague, the Netherlands

Sport
- Sport: Alpine skiing

Baroness Gratia Maria Margretha Schimmelpenninck van der Oye (10 July 1912 – 12 February 2012) was a Dutch alpine skichampion and entrepreneur.

Her father Alphert, Baron Schimmelpenninck van der Oye was president of the Dutch National Olympic Committee, during the 1928 Summer Olympics in Amsterdam, and a long-term member of the International Olympic Committee. Gratia reached sixth place at the 1935 world championships downhill for women in Kitzbühel. She is one of six female "Hanhenekammsieger", winning all of the downhill, slalom and combination races in the Hahnenkamm competition in 1935. In 1936 she won the Hahnenkamm downhill race, the combination of the Mégève Ski-Club de Paris Grand Prix, de Arlberg Kandahar downhill and was the first Dutch female competitor in the 1936 Winter Olympics in Garmisch-Partenkirchen. The day before the race her starting licence was revoked by the German organisers based on the false accusation of her being a professional skier. Her starting licence was finally returned before the race but her preparation very much hindered as a result. Despite two falls, she finished 14th in the alpine combined event which remains the highest ranking in Olympic skiing reached by a Dutch national.

After retiring, Schimmelpenninck van der Oye became the first female member of the board of the International Ski Federation. She was member of honour of the Dutch skiing federation and served as a skiing official at two Winter Olympics, amongst others controlling the race trajectories on safety.

In the 1970s, she gained national fame once again, this time through her diet club Gratia Club voor Slankblijvers (Gratia Club for Staying Slim), founded in 1969. By 1973 she grew it into a national organization with 4,000 members. At the end of 1973, the American company Weight Watchers acquired the shares and the company continued as Weight Watchers Nederland. Schimmelpenninck van der Oye was managing director until mid-1978.

Schimmelpenninck van der Oye died in Den Haag on Sunday 12 February 2012, age 99.
