= Nora Strømstad =

Norwegian alpine skier (1909–2005)

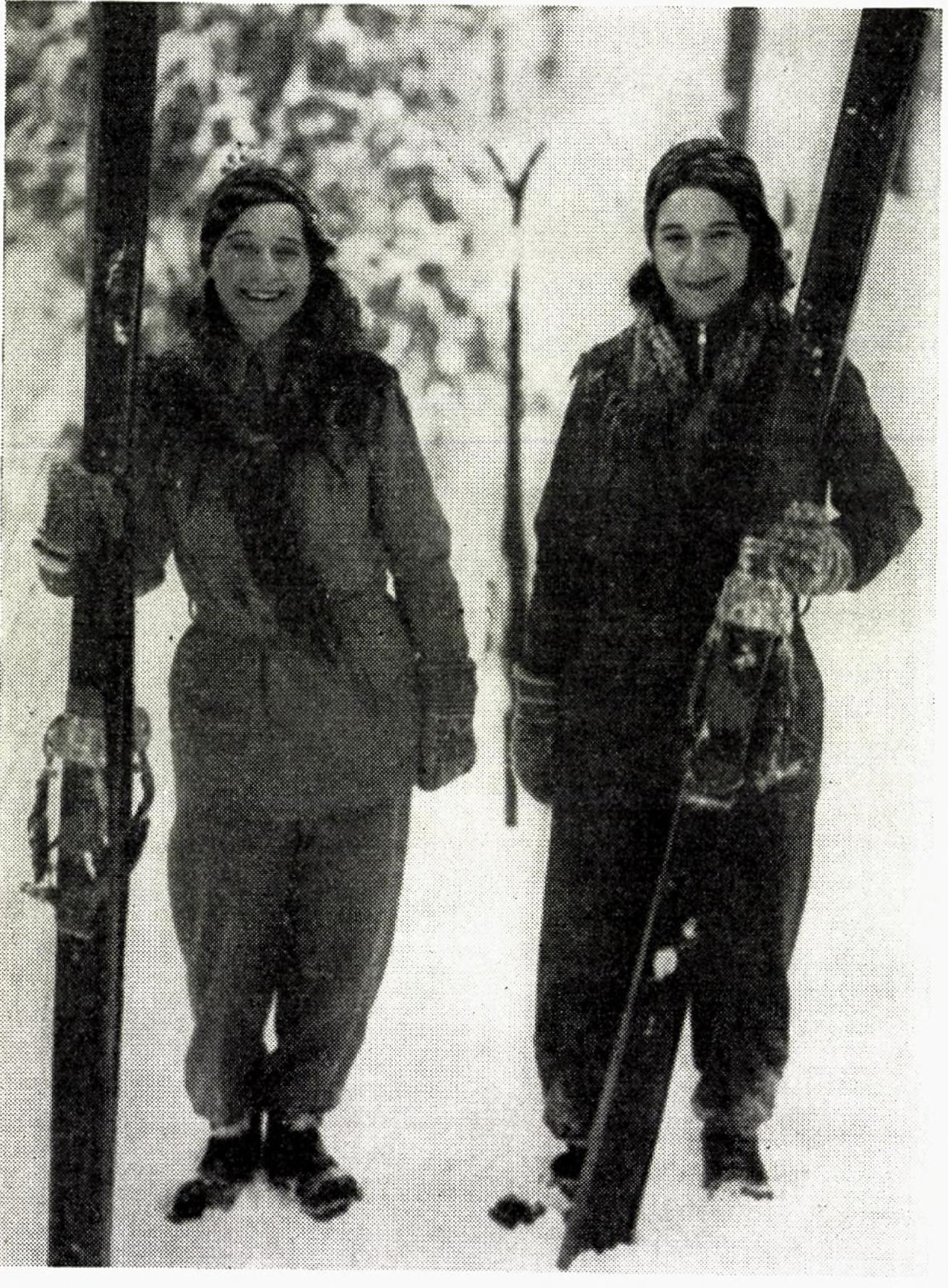

Nora Strømstad (January 26, 1909 – January 6, 2005) was a Norwegian alpine skier who competed in the 1936 Winter Olympics. She was the younger sister of 1924 Winter Olympics skier Thoralf Strømstad.

In 1936 she finished eleventh in the alpine skiing combined event.
