= Grete Nissl =

Austrian alpine skier

Personal information
- Nationality: Austrian
- Born: 30 October 1911; Innsbruck, Austria-Hungary

Sport
- Sport: Alpine skiing

Grete Nissl (born 30 October 1911, date of death unknown) was an Austrian alpine skier. She competed in the women's combined event at the 1936 Winter Olympics.
