= Werner Beinhauer =

German linguist and hispanist (1896–1983)

Werner Beinhauer (March 9, 1896 – January 1, 1983) was a German Romance philologist and Hispanist.

== Biography ==
Beinhauer was born in Neustadt an der Weinstraße. He earned his doctrate in Romance philology (Beiträge zur Kenntnis der spanischen Umgangssprache) in 1923.

== Books ==
A list of his books can be found, eg., in the French IdRef catalog.

- Frases y dialogos de la vida diaria, Leipzig 1925, 3rd edition Leipzig 1940
- Spanische Umgangssprache, Berlin 1930, 2nd edition Bonn 1958
- Spanische Unterrichtssprache. Ein Hilfsbuch für höhere Lehranstalten, Berlin 1931, 2nd edition München 1960
- Spanischer Sprachhumor (Augenblicksbildungen), Bonn/Köln 1932, New York 1968
- Der spanische Nationalcharakter, Paderborn 1937 (Spanish: El Caracter español, Madrid 1944)
- La España nueva, Paderborn 1938
- 1000 idiomatische spanische Redensarten. Mit Erklärungen und Beispielen, Berlin 1939
- Das Tier in der spanischen Bildsprache, Hamburg 1949
- Humorismo español, Paderborn 1961
- El español coloquial, Versión española de Fernando Huarte Morton. Prólogo de Dámaso Alonso, Madrid 1963, 2nd edition Madrid 1968, 3rd edition Madrid 1991
- El humorismo en el español hablado: improvisadas creaciones espontáneas, preface by Rafael Lapesa, Madrid 1973
- Obsesión por lo humano, Avila 1975
- Stilistisch-phraseologisches Wörterbuch spanisch-deutsch, München 1978
- 1000 idiomatische Redensarten Spanisch, Berlin 1980
