= Mirdza Martinsone =

Latvian alpine skier (1916–1983)

Personal information
- Nationality: Latvian
- Born: 24 November 1916
- Died: 20 September 1983 (aged 66); New York, New York, United States

Sport
- Sport: Alpine skiing

Mirdza Martinsone (24 November 1916 – 20 September 1983) was a Latvian alpine skier. She competed in the women's combined event at the 1936 Winter Olympics.
