= Nordic skiing at the 1932 Winter Olympics =

At the 1932 Winter Olympics, four Nordic skiing events were contested – two cross-country skiing events, one ski jumping event, and one Nordic combined event.

Nordic skiing discipline	Events
Cross-country skiing	• 18 km
Cross-country skiing	• 50 km
Ski jumping	• Large hill
Nordic combined	• Individual
