= Rösli Streiff =

Swiss alpine skier (1901–1997)

Medal record

Representing Switzerland

Women's Alpine skiing

World Championships
Gold medal – first place	1932 Cortina	Slalom
Gold medal – first place	1932 Cortina	Combined

Rösli Streiff (1901, Glarus – 7 February 1997) was a Swiss alpine skier and world champion.

Streiff won two gold medals at the 1932 World Championships in Cortina d'Ampezzo, winning the slalom event and the combined.

== Biography ==
Streiff began competing in ski races in 1928 and became a founding member of the Swiss Ladies Ski Club in 1929. In July 1929, she won the slalom at the summer ski race at Jungfraujoch, and finished third in the downhill. At the 1931 Arlberg-Kandahar races in Mürren, she finished third in the slalom and combined, and fourth in the downhill. Later that year, again in Mürren, Streiff competed in the first Alpine World Ski Championships, where she achieved placings in the midfield.

At the first SDS races of the Swiss Ladies Ski Club on 15 January 1932, Streiff won every event. Two weeks later, she was also a triple winner in downhill, slalom and combined events at the Great Ski Race of Switzerland – the Swiss Ski Championships – in Zermatt. However, no championship titles were awarded at the time, only traveling prizes. Streiff reached the peak of her career in early February 1932 at the World Championships in Cortina d'Ampezzo. She first finished eighth in the downhill, and the next day became world champion in the slalom, beating Britain's Audrey Sale-Barker by more than ten seconds. This performance also secured her the world title in the combined event.
