= Helen Boughton-Leigh =

American skier (1906–1999)

Personal information
- Born: January 15, 1906; Cleveland, Ohio, U.S.
- Died: December 28, 1999 (aged 93); Palm Springs, California, U.S.

Sport
- Sport: Alpine skiing

Helen Boughton-Leigh (January 15, 1906 – December 28, 1999) was an American alpine skier. She competed in the women's combined event at the 1936 Winter Olympics.

Although originally American, she adopted British nationality for a short time in the 1930s. She also won a silver medal at the 1933 Slalom World Championship.
