= Edwina Chamier =

Canadian alpine skier (1890–1981)

Edwina Chamier (27 March 1890, Chester, Nova Scotia - 31 May 1981, England) née Edwina Ratcliff Lordly, was a Canadian Alpine skiing Olympic champion. Until 2002 she was the oldest athlete ever to take part to the winter games, as she was 45 years old (and 318 days) when she did the slalom competition at the Garmisch-Partenkirchen Winter Olympics of 1936. The record was beaten in 2002 by Anne Abernathy, aged 48, during the 2002 Winter Olympics.

Edwina enrolled as a sister nurse during World War I on the French theater of war. She married Royal air force officer John Adrian Chamier in 1918. They had two sons, one was a Royal air force member and died in 1940 in Rhodesia, the other, John Edwin Chamier, was a sailor, a journalist and an author.
