= Hady Pfeiffer =

Austrian-German alpine skier (1906–2002)

Medal record

Representing Austria

Women's Alpine skiing

World Championship
Bronze medal – third place	1932 Cortina d'Ampezzo	Downhill
Bronze medal – third place	1932 Cortina d'Ampezzo	Combined

Representing Germany

World Championship
Silver medal – second place	1935 Mürren	Downhill

Hady Pfeifer (née Lantschner; 22 September 1906 – 10 December 2002) was an Austrian and later German alpine skier who competed in the 1936 Winter Olympics.

She was born in Innsbruck, Austria.

In 1936 she finished fifth in the alpine skiing combined event.
