= Růžena Beinhauerová =

Czech alpine skier (1912–1968)

Personal information
- Nationality: Czech
- Born: 23 September 1912; Ostrava, Austria-Hungary
- Died: 16 May 1968 (aged 55); Ivančice, Czechoslovakia

Sport
- Sport: Alpine skiing

Růžena Beinhauerová (23 September 1912 – 16 May 1968) was a Czech alpine skier. She competed in the women's combined event at the 1936 Winter Olympics. In addition to skiing, she also played basketball and after the Second World War she was the Czechoslovak representative in rowing.
