= Paula Wiesinger =

Italianalpine skier

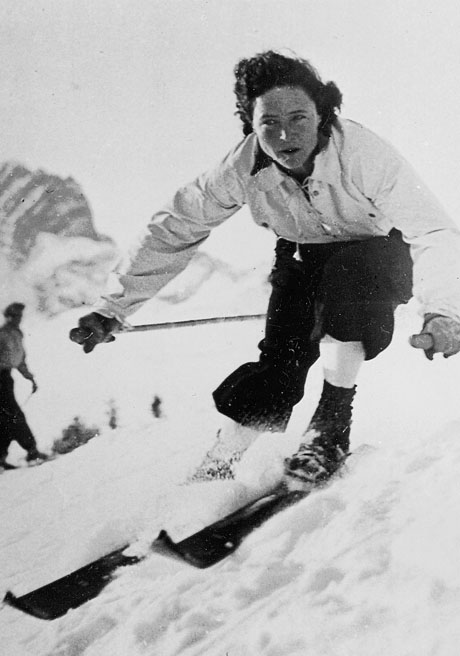
- Wiesinger skiing on the Dolomites in 1930

Personal information
- Full name: Paula (Paola) Rosa Wiesinger, later Steger
- Born: 27 February 1907 Bolzano, Austria-Hungary
- Died: 12 June 2001 (aged 94) Seiser Alm, Italy

Skiing career
- Sport: Alpine skiing
- Retired: 1936
- Disciplines: Polyvalent

World Championships
- Teams: 4
- Medals: 1 (1 gold)
Medal record
World Championships
Gold medal – first place	1932 Cortina d'Ampezzo	Downhill

Paula (Paola) Rosa Wiesinger later Steger (27 February 1907 – 12 June 2001) was a pioneering Italian alpine skier and mountain climber who competed at one edition of Winter Olympics and three editions of the FIS Alpine World Ski Championships (1932, 1933, 1934, 1936).

== Biography ==
Wiesinger was born in Bolzano. She won the 1932 women's Downhill world championship in Cortina d'Ampezzo, and competed in the 1936 Winter Olympics, finishing 16th in the alpine skiing combined event. She married Hans Steger.

In 1935 Wiesinger was invited to view the Trofeo Mezzalama, a competition that was only intended for male ski mountaineers. Due to an injury leave of Giusto Gervasutti, she took his military uniform, covered her face with sunglasses and his cap, and took part instead of him, but the cheat was discovered at a check point of the race. She died in Seiser Alm. A hotel and a statue in Siusi allo Sciliar are dedicated to Wiesinger.

== Olympic Games results ==
Year	Vanue	Race	Rank
1936	(Germany) Garmisch-Partenkirchen	Alpine combined	16

== World Championship results ==
Edition	Slalom	Downhill	Combined
1932	13	1	6
1933	19	4	11
1934	5	12	11
1936	-	DNF	-

== National titles ==
Wiesinger won 15 national titles.

- Italian Alpine Ski Championships
  - Downhill: 1931, 1933, 1934, 1935, 1936 (5)
  - Slalom: 1931, 1933, 1934, 1936 (4)
  - Combined: 1931, 1932, 1933, 1934, 1935, 1936 (6)

== See also ==
- Italy national alpine ski at the World championships
