= Italian Alpine Ski Championships =

Annual skiing competition in Italy

Italian Alpine Ski Championships Campionati italiani di sci alpino
- Sport: Alpine skiing
- Founded: 1931
- Country: Italy
- Website: FISI

The Italian Alpine Ski Championships (Italian: Campionati italiani di sci alpino) are the national championships in alpine skiing, organised every year by the Federazione Italiana Sport Invernali (FISI).

2023 edition held in La Thuile, Aosta Valley from 21 to 25 March 2023.

== Results ==
All results up to the 2026 edition.

=== Men ===
Year	Downhill	Super-G	Giant slalom	Slalom	Combined
1931	Severino Menardi	not disputed		Severino Menardi	Severino Menardi
1932	Ferdinando Valle	not disputed		Ferdinando Valle	Ferdinando Valle
1933	Sisto Gillarduzzi	not disputed		Renato Valico	Renato Valle
1934	Enrico Lacedelli	not disputed		Renato Dimai	Severino Menardi
1935	Severino Menardi	not disputed		Vittorio Chierroni	Vittorio Chierroni
1936	Vittorio Chierroni	not disputed		Giacinto Sertorelli	Vittorio Chierroni
1937	Alberto Marcellin	not disputed		Franco Sisi	Giovanni Sisi
1938	Vittorio Chierroni	not disputed		Hans Nogler	Hans Nogler
1939	Hans Nogler	not disputed		Hans Nogler	Hans Nogler
1940	Vittorio Chierroni	not disputed		Vittorio Chierroni	Vittorio Chierroni
1941	Zeno Colò	not disputed		Zeno Colò	Zeno Colò
1942	Roberto Lacedelli	not disputed		Giuseppe Confortola	Roberto Lacedelli
1943	Vittorio Chierroni	not disputed		Zeno Colò	Zeno Colò
1944	not assigned	not disputed		not assigned	not assigned
1945	not assigned	not disputed		not assigned	not assigned
1946	Alberto Marcellin	not disputed		Zeno Colò	Zeno Colò
1947	Vittorio Chierroni	not disputed		Zeno Colò; Roberto Lacedelli	Zeno Colò
1948	Zeno Colò	not disputed		Zeno Colò	Zeno Colò
1949	Zeno Colò	not disputed		Eugenio Monti	not disputed
1950	Roberto Lacedelli	not disputed	Eugenio Monti	Eugenio Monti	not disputed
1951	Rolando Zanni	not disputed	Albino Alverà	Albino Alverà	not disputed
1952	Bruno Burrini	not disputed	Zeno Colò	Carlo Gartner	not disputed
1953	Davide David	not disputed	Carlo Gartner	Otto Gluck	not disputed
1954	Zeno Colò	not disputed	Zeno Colò	Zeno Colò	not disputed
1955	Zeno Colò	not disputed	Bruno Alberti	Zeno Colò	not disputed
1956	Gino Burrini	not disputed	Gino Burrini	Otto Gluck	not disputed
1957	Davide David	not disputed	Gino Burrini	Paride Milianti	not disputed
1958	Bruno Alberti	not disputed	Gino Burrini	Otto Gluck	not disputed
1959	Bruno Alberti	not disputed	Carlo Senoner	Aldo Zulian	not disputed
1960	Francesco De Florian	not disputed	Francesco De Florian	Helmuth Gartner	not disputed
1961	Bruno Alberti	not disputed	Bruno Alberti	Osvaldo Picchiottino	not disputed
1962	Bruno Alberti	not disputed	Paride Milianti	Felice De Nicolò	not disputed
1963	Gildo Siorpaes	not disputed	Martino Fill	Ivo Mahlknecht	not disputed
1964	Felice De Nicolò	not disputed	Ivo Mahlknecht	Ivo Mahlknecht	not disputed
1965	Ivo Mahlknecht	not disputed	Renzo Zandegiacomo	Paride Milianti	not disputed
1966	Ivo Mahlknecht	not disputed	Bruno Piazzalunga	Giovanni Di Bona	Giovanni Di Bona
1967	not assigned	not disputed	Felice De Nicolò	Felice De Nicolò	not assigned
1968	Ivo Mahlknecht	not disputed	Ivo Mahlknecht	Ivo Mahlknecht	Ivo Mahlknecht
1969	Stefano Anzi	not disputed	Gerardo Mussner	Pier Lorenzo Clataud	Felice De Nicolò
1970	Stefano Anzi	not disputed	Sergio Filippa	Giuseppe Compagnoni	Gustav Thöni
1971	Marcello Varallo	not disputed	Eberhard Schmalzl	Gustav Thöni	Helmuth Schmalzl
1972	not assigned	not disputed	Renzo Zandegiacomo	Ilario Pegorari	not assigned
1973	Roland Thöni	not disputed	Helmuth Schmalzl	Gustav Thöni	Ilario Pegorari
1974	Giuliano Besson	not disputed	Piero Gros	Fausto Radici	Piero Gros
1975	Herbert Plank	not disputed	Gustav Thöni	Piero Gros	Herbert Plank
1976	Erwin Stricker	not disputed	Piero Gros	Piero Gros	Piero Gros
1977	Herbert Plank	not disputed	Gustav Thöni	Franco Bieler	Erwin Stricker
1978	Bruno Gattai	not disputed	Peter Mally	Peter Mally	Piero Gros
1979	Herbert Plank	not disputed	Maurizio Poncet	Piero Gros	Herbert Plank
1980	Herbert Plank	not disputed	Tiziano Bieller	Piero Gros	Siegfried Kerschbaumer
1981	Herbert Plank	not disputed	Riccardo Foppa	Bruno Nöckler	Andrea Arban
1982	Danilo Sbardellotto	not disputed	Alex Giorgi	Piero Gros	Loris Donei
1983	Michael Mair	not disputed	Efrem Merelli	Ivano Edalini	Richard Pramotton
1984	Mauro Cornaz	not disputed	Alex Giorgi	Oswald Tötsch	Heinz Holzer
1985	Alberto Ghidoni	not disputed	Robert Erlacher	Marco Tonazzi	Luca Pesando
1986	Michael Mair	Ivan Marzola	Richard Pramotton	Richard Pramotton	Michael Mair
1987	Michael Mair	Danilo Sbardellotto	Giglio Tomasi	Alex Giorgi	Richard Pramotton
1988	Pietro Vitalini	Heinz Holzer	Roberto Spampatti	Alberto Tomba	Josef Polig
1989	not assigned	not assigned	Attilio Barcella	Roberto Grigis	not assigned
1990	Kristian Ghedina	Kristian Ghedina	Alberto Tomba	Alberto Tomba	not assigned
1991	not assigned	Peter Runggaldier	Alberto Tomba	Alberto Tomba	not assigned
1992	Pietro Vitalini	Alberto Senigagliesi	Alberto Tomba	Fabrizio Tescari	Gianfranco Martin
1993	Kristian Ghedina	Werner Perathoner	Gerhard Königsrainer	Alberto Tomba	Josef Polig
1994	Kristian Ghedina	Werner Perathoner	Norman Bergamelli	Alberto Tomba	Gianfranco Martin
1995	Kristian Ghedina	Werner Perathoner	Sergio Bergamelli	Angelo Weiss	Kristian Ghedina
1996	Luca Cattaneo	Werner Perathoner	Gianluca Grigoletto	Konrad Kurt Ladstätter	not assigned
1997	Erik Seletto	Peter Runggaldier	Gerhard Königsrainer	Fabrizio Tescari	Kristian Ghedina
1998	Kristian Ghedina	Ludwig Sprenger	Patrick Holzer	Gianluca Grigoletto	Kristian Ghedina
1999	Matteo Berbenni	Maurizio Feller	Matteo Nana	Matteo Nana	Massimiliano Blardone
2000	Kristian Ghedina	Kristian Ghedina	Alexander Ploner	Matteo Nana	Edoardo Zardini
2001	Matteo Berbenni	Patrick Staudacher	Massimiliano Blardone	Hannes Paul Schmid	Patrick Staudacher
2002	not assigned	Kristian Ghedina	Patrick Thaler	Thomas Bergamelli	not assigned
2003	Kurt Sulzenbacher	Erik Seletto	Michael Gufler	Manfred Mölgg	Peter Fill
2004	Roland Fischnaller	Werner Heel	Peter Fill	Giancarlo Bergamelli	Peter Fill
2005	Stefan Thanei	Patrick Staudacher	Manfred Mölgg	Cristian Deville	Peter Fill
2006	Walter Girardi	Peter Fill	Florian Eisath	Giuliano Razzoli	Christof Innerhofer
2007	Walter Girardi	not assigned	Peter Fill	Lucas Senoner	Alex Happacher
2008	Elmar Hofer	Aronne Pieruz	Michael Gufler	Lucas Senoner	Davide Simoncelli
2009	Stefan Thanei	Dominik Paris	Alexander Ploner	Manfred Mölgg	Peter Fill
2010	Patrick Staudacher	Patrick Staudacher	Manfred Mölgg	Manfred Mölgg	Aronne Pieruz
2011	Matteo Marsaglia	Giovanni Borsotti	Florian Eisath	Giuliano Razzoli	Mattia Casse
2012	Hagen Patscheider	Matteo Marsaglia	Davide Simoncelli	Roberto Nani	not assigned
2013	Paolo Pangrazzi	Dominik Paris	Davide Simoncelli	Manfred Mölgg	not assigned
2014	Peter Fill; Werner Heel	Matteo Marsaglia	Roberto Nani	Stefano Gross	Matteo Marsaglia
2015	Matteo Marsaglia	Peter Fill	Florian Eisath	Giuliano Razzoli	Michelangelo Tentori
2016	Christof Innerhofer	Mattia Casse	Riccardo Tonetti	Patrick Thaler	Matteo De Vettori
2017	Peter Fill	Dominik Paris	Giulio Bosca	Tommaso Sala	Guglielmo Bosca
2018	Christof Innerhofer	Matteo Marsaglia	Giulio Bosca	Riccardo Tonetti	Christof Innerhofer
2019	Matteo Marsaglia	Matteo Marsaglia	Hannes Zingerle	Pietro Canzio	Christof Innerhofer
2020	Not disputed due COVID-19				
2021	Dominik Paris	Emanuele Buzzi	Hannes Zingerle	Stefano Gross	Giovanni Franzoni; Federico Paini
2022	Dominik Paris	Christof Innerhofer	Alex Hofer	Alex Vinatzer	Giovanni Borsotti
2023	Christof Innerhofer	Pietro Zazzi	Tommaso Sala	Stefano Gross	Matteo Franzoso
2024	Dominik Paris	Guglielmo Bosca	Luca De Aliprandini	Stefano Gross	cancelled
2025	Christof Innerhofer	Giovanni Franzoni	Giovanni Franzoni	Stefano Gross; Tommaso Saccardi	not scheduled
2026	Races cancelled due to high temperatures		Giovanni Borsotti	Alex Vinatzer	not scheduled

=== Women ===
Year	Downhill	Super-G	Giant slalom	Slalom	Combinated
1931	Paula Wiesinger	not disputed		Paula Wiesinger	Paula Wiesinger
1932	Paula Wiesinger	not disputed		Delly Velo	Paula Wiesinger
1933	Iseline Crivelli	not disputed		Paula Wiesinger	Paula Wiesinger
1934	Paula Wiesinger	not disputed		Paula Wiesinger	Paula Wiesinger
1935	Paula Wiesinger	not disputed		Nives Dei Rossi	Paula Wiesinger
1936	Paula Wiesinger	not disputed		Paula Wiesinger	Paula Wiesinger
1937	Celina Seghi	not disputed		Celina Seghi	Celina Seghi
1938	Clara Frida	not disputed		Gabriela Ansbacher	Gabriela Ansbacher
1939	Celina Seghi	not disputed		Vittoria Ferrari	Celina Seghi
1940	Nives Dei Rossi	not disputed		Nives Dei Rossi	Nives Dei Rossi
1941	Celina Seghi	not disputed		Celina Seghi	Celina Seghi
1942	Gabriela Ansbacher	not disputed		Celina Seghi	Celina Seghi
1943	Celina Seghi	not disputed		Celina Seghi	Celina Seghi
1944	not assigned	not disputed		not assigned	not assigned
1945	not assigned	not disputed		not assigned	not assigned
1946	Celina Seghi	not disputed		Celina Seghi	Celina Seghi
1947	Renata Carraretto	not disputed		Celina Seghi	Renata Carraretto
1948	Celina Seghi	not disputed		Renata Carraretto	Celina Seghi
1949	Celina Seghi	not disputed		Celina Seghi	not disputed
1950	Maria Grazia Marchelli	not disputed	Franca De Renzis	Franca De Renzis	not disputed
1951	Maria Grazia Marchelli	not disputed	Giuliana Minuzzo	Celina Seghi	not disputed
1952	Giuliana Chenal Minuzzo	not disputed	Celina Seghi	Celina Seghi	not disputed
1953	Giuliana Chenal Minuzzo	not disputed	Giuliana Chenal Minuzzo	Giuliana Chenal Minuzzo	not disputed
1954	Carla Marchelli	not disputed	Anna Pellissier	Celina Seghi	not disputed
1955	Giuliana Chenal Minuzzo	not disputed	Carla Marchelli	Giuliana Chenal Minuzzo	not disputed
1956	Vera Schenone	not disputed	Vera Schenone	Vera Schenone	not disputed
1957	Vera Schenone	not disputed	Carla Marchelli	Vera Schenone	not disputed
1958	Pia Riva	not disputed	Pia Riva	Jerta Schir	not disputed
1959	Pia Riva	not disputed	Jerta Schir	Giuliana Chenal Minuzzo	not disputed
1960	Lidia Pedroncelli	not disputed	Tina Poloni	Vera Schenone	not disputed
1961	Pia Riva	not disputed	Pia Riva	Jerta Schir	not disputed
1962	Inge Senoner	not disputed	Pia Riva	Jerta Schir	not disputed
1963	Pia Riva	not disputed	Pia Riva	Giuliana Chenal Minuzzo	not disputed
1964	Pia Riva	not disputed	Pia Riva	Inge Senoner	not disputed
1965	Giustina Demetz	not disputed	Giustina Demetz	Maria Isabella Chevallard	not disputed
1966	Lidia Barbieri	not disputed	Giustina Demetz	Glorianda Cipolla	Lidia Barbieri
1967	not assigned	not disputed	Giustina Demetz	Giustina Demetz	not assigned
1968	Giustina Demetz	not disputed	Giustina Demetz	Giustina Demetz	Giustina Demetz
1969	Giustina Demetz	not disputed	Clotilde Fasolis	Clotilde Fasolis	Clotilde Fasolis
1970	Elena Matous	not disputed	Elena Matous	Lidia Pellissier	Elena Matous
1971	Elena Matous	not disputed	Clotilde Fasolis	Lidia Pellissier	Clotilde Fasolis
1972	not assigned	not disputed	Lidia Pellissier	Elena Matous	Lidia Pellissier
1973	Maddalena Silvestri	not disputed	Claudia Giordani	Claudia Giordani	Claudia Giordani
1974	Claudia Giordani	not disputed	Claudia Giordani	Cristina Tisot	Paola Hofer
1975	Iolanda Plank	not disputed	Cristina Tisot	Daniela Viberti	Daniela Viberti
1976	Iolanda Plank	not disputed	Claudia Giordani	Claudia Giordani	Claudia Giordani
1977	Wanda Bieler	not disputed	Wilma Gatta	Claudia Giordani	Wilma Gatta
1978	Giuliana Campiglia	not disputed	Claudia Giordani	Claudia Giordani	Wilma Gatta
1979	not assigned	not disputed	Claudia Giordani	Claudia Giordani	not assigned
1980	Iolanda Plank	not disputed	Claudia Giordani	Daniela Zini	Paoletta Magoni
1981	not assigned	not disputed	Wanda Bieler	Daniela Zini	not assigned
1982	Linda Rocchetti	not disputed	Daniela Zini	Daniela Zini	Daniela Zini
1983	Karla Delago	not disputed	Fulvia Stevenin	Maria Rosa Quario	Karla Delago
1984	Karla Delago	not disputed	Daniela Zini	Paoletta Magoni	Paola Tonolli
1985	Karla Delago	not disputed	Fulvia Stevenin	Paoletta Magoni	Michaela Marzola
1986	Karla Delago	Michaela Marzola	Cecilia Lucco	Nadia Bonfini	Karla Delago
1987	not assigned	Michaela Marzola	Fulvia Stevenin	Paoletta Magoni	not assigned
1988	Michaela Marzola	Michaela Marzola	Cecilia Lucco	Paoletta Magoni	not assigned
1989	not assigned	not assigned	Deborah Compagnoni	Deborah Compagnoni	not assigned
1990	Michaela Marzola	Michaela Marzola	Roberta Serra	Renate Oberhofer	not assigned
1991	Michaela Marzola	Deborah Compagnoni	Deborah Compagnoni	Giovanna Gianera	not assigned
1992	Barbara Merlin	Isolde Kostner	Sabina Panzanini	Roberta Serra	Barbara Merlin
1993	Bibiana Perez	Bibiana Perez	Deborah Compagnoni	Roberta Pergher	Barbara Merlin
1994	Bibiana Perez	Barbara Merlin	Deborah Compagnoni	Roberta Pergher	Bibiana Perez
1995	Isolde Kostner	Isolde Kostner	Karen Putzer	Morena Gallizio	Morena Gallizio
1996	Isolde Kostner; Elena Bresciani	Isolde Kostner	Isolde Kostner	Antje Braito	Antje Braito
1997	Bibiana Perez	Isolde Kostner	Deborah Compagnoni	Lara Magoni	Morena Gallizio
1998	Isolde Kostner	Isolde Kostner	Karen Putzer	Lara Magoni	Annalisa Ceresa
1999	Isolde Kostner	Isolde Kostner	Karen Putzer	Nicole Gius	Karen Putzer
2000	not assigned	Isolde Kostner	Denise Karbon	Elisabetta Biavaschi	not assigned
2001	Patrizia Bassis	Patrizia Bassis	Magdalena Planatscher	Elisabetta Biavaschi	Angelika Grüner
2002	not assigned	Daniela Ceccarelli	Manuela Mölgg	Denise Karbon	not assigned
2003	Daniela Ceccarelli	Lucia Recchia	Karen Putzer	Nicole Gius	Karoline Trojer
2004	Nadia Fanchini	Nadia Fanchini	Lucia Recchia	Nicole Gius	Nadia Fanchini
2005	Elena Fanchini	Lucia Recchia	Karen Putzer	Nicole Gius	Daniela Merighetti
2006	Nadia Fanchini	Nadia Fanchini	Manuela Mölgg	Manuela Mölgg	Lucia Mazzotti
2007	Elena Fanchini	not assigned	Magdalena Eisath	Nicole Gius	Lucia Mazzotti
2008	Nadia Fanchini	Nadia Fanchini	Denise Karbon	Nicole Gius	Daniela Merighetti
2009	Daniela Merighetti	Daniela Merighetti	Giulia Gianesini	Nicole Gius	Daniela Merighetti
2010	Elena Fanchini	Enrica Cipriani	Irene Curtoni	Irene Curtoni	Camilla Borsotti
2011	Elena Fanchini	Hilary Longhini	Federica Brignone	Chiara Costazza	Elena Curtoni
2012	Elena Fanchini	Daniela Merighetti	Denise Karbon	Irene Curtoni	not assigned
2013	Daniela Merighetti	Verena Stuffer	Elena Curtoni	Irene Curtoni	not assigned
2014	Verena Stuffer	Nadia Fanchini	Marta Bassino	Chiara Costazza	Camilla Borsotti
2015	Elena Fanchini	Nadia Fanchini	Nadia Fanchini	Roberta Midali	Francesca Marsaglia
2016	Elena Fanchini	Nadia Fanchini	not assigned	Irene Curtoni	Federica Brignone
2017	Verena Stuffer	Federica Brignone	Federica Brignone	Irene Curtoni	Federica Brignone
2018	Johanna Schnarf	Nicol Delago	Federica Brignone	Vivien Insam	Johanna Schnarf
2019	Nadia Fanchini	Nadia Fanchini	Marta Bassino	Marta Bassino	Vera Tschurtschenthaler
2020	Not disputed due COVID-19				
2021	Nadia Delago	Francesca Marsaglia	Marta Bassino	Federica Brignone	Francesca Marsaglia
2022	Nadia Delago	Nicol Delago	Elisa Platino	Petra Unterholzner	Roberta Melesi
2023	Monica Zanoner	Federica Brignone	Emilia Mondinelli	cancelled due to rain	Federica Brignone
2024	Nicol Delago	Matilde Lorenzi	Federica Brignone	Marta Rossetti	cancelled
2025	Laura Pirovano	Laura Pirovano	Ilaria Ghisalberti	Marta Rossetti	not scheduled
2026	Races cancelled due to high temperatures		Anna Trocker	Anna Trocker	not scheduled

== Multiwinners ==
=== Men ===
#	Skier	Wins
1	Zeno Colò	19
2	Kristian Ghedina	12
3	Peter Fill	10
3	Piero Gros	10
3	Vittorio Chierroni	10
6	Ivo Mahlknecht	9
7	Christof Innerhofer	8
7	Matteo Marsaglia	8
7	Alberto Tomba	8
10	Dominik Paris	6
10	Manfred Mölgg	6
10	Bruno Alberti	6
13	Gustav Thöni	5

=== Women ===
#	Skier	Wins
1	Celina Seghi	25
2	Paula Wiesinger	15
3	Claudia Giordani	14
4	Nadia Fanchini	13
5	Isolde Kostner	12
6	Federica Brignone	10
6	Giustina Demetz	10
6	Pia Riva	10

== See also ==
- Italian Winter Sports Federation
- Italy national alpine ski team
