= Italy at the 1998 Winter Olympics =

- IOC code: ITA
- NOC: Italian National Olympic Committee
- Website: www.coni.it (in Italian)

in Nagano
- Competitors: 113 (79 men, 34 women) in 13 sports
- Flag bearer: Gerda Weissensteiner (luge)
- Medals Ranked 10th: Gold 2 Silver 6 Bronze 2 Total 10

Winter Olympics appearances (overview)
- 1924; 1928; 1932; 1936; 1948; 1952; 1956; 1960; 1964; 1968; 1972; 1976; 1980; 1984; 1988; 1992; 1994; 1998; 2002; 2006; 2010; 2014; 2018; 2022; 2026

Italy competed at the 1998 Winter Olympics in Nagano, Japan.

== Medalists ==
Medal	Name	Sport	Event	Date
Gold	Günther Huber; Antonio Tartaglia	Bobsleigh	Two-man	15 February
Gold	Deborah Compagnoni	Alpine skiing	Women's giant slalom	20 February
Silver	Thomas Prugger	Snowboarding	Men's giant slalom	8 February
Silver	Armin Zöggeler	Luge	Men's singles	9 February
Silver	Pieralberto Carrara	Biathlon	Men's individual	11 February
Silver	Marco Albarello; Fulvio Valbusa; Fabio Maj; Silvio Fauner	Cross-country skiing	Men's 4 × 10 kilometre relay	18 February
Silver	Deborah Compagnoni	Alpine skiing	Women's slalom	19 February
Silver	Stefania Belmondo	Cross-country skiing	Women's 30 kilometre freestyle	20 February
Bronze	Silvio Fauner	Cross-country skiing	Men's 30 kilometre classical	9 February
Bronze	Karin Moroder; Gabriella Paruzzi; Manuela Di Centa; Stefania Belmondo	Cross-country skiing	Women's 4 × 5 kilometre relay	16 February

== Competitors ==
The following is the list of number of competitors in the Games.

Sport	Men	Women	Total
Alpine skiing	12	10	22
Biathlon	5	1	6
Bobsleigh	8	–	8
Cross-country skiing	7	6	13
Figure skating	3	3	6
Freestyle skiing	1	1	2
Ice hockey	22	0	22
Luge	7	3	10
Nordic combined	1	–	1
Short track speed skating	5	4	9
Ski jumping	1	–	1
Snowboarding	4	5	9
Speed skating	3	1	4
Total	79	34	113

== Alpine skiing ==
Men

Athlete	Event	Race 1	Race 2	Total	
Athlete	Event	Time	Time	Time	Rank
Peter Runggaldier	Downhill			DNF	–
Luca Cattaneo	Downhill			DNF	–
Werner Perathoner	Downhill			1:52.36	16
Kristian Ghedina	Downhill			1:50.76	6
Peter Runggaldier	Super-G			1:37.00	19
Kristian Ghedina	Super-G			1:36.70	16
Werner Perathoner	Super-G			1:36.64	15
Alessandro Fattori	Super-G			1:35.61	4
Alberto Tomba	Giant Slalom	DNF	–	DNF	–
Matteo Nana	Giant Slalom	1:22.43	1:19.94	2:42.37	15
Patrick Holzer	Giant Slalom	1:22.39	DNF	DNF	–
Sergio Bergamelli	Giant Slalom	1:22.38	1:20.40	2:42.78	16
Fabrizio Tescari	Slalom	DNF	–	DNF	–
Alberto Tomba	Slalom	57.00	DNF	DNF	–
Angelo Weiss	Slalom	56.87	55.93	1:52.80	16
Matteo Nana	Slalom	56.59	55.37	1:51.96	11

Men's combined

Athlete	Slalom		Downhill	Total	
Athlete	Time 1	Time 2	Time	Total time	Rank
Erik Seletto	56.30	51.16	1:35.77	3:23.23	10
Alessandro Fattori	55.45	45.26	1:36.29	3:17.00	6
Luca Cattaneo	53.59	49.33	DNF	DNF	–
Kristian Ghedina	51.58	48.77	DNF	DNF	–

Women

Athlete	Event	Race 1	Race 2	Total	
Athlete	Event	Time	Time	Time	Rank
Isolde Kostner	Downhill			DNF	–
Morena Gallizio	Downhill			1:32.22	26
Alessandra Merlin	Downhill			1:31.44	21
Bibiana Perez	Downhill			1:31.43	20
Karen Putzer	Super-G			1:20.16	28
Barbara Merlin	Super-G			1:19.64	23
Bibiana Perez	Super-G			1:19.47	22
Isolde Kostner	Super-G			1:18.62	11
Karen Putzer	Giant Slalom	1:22.15	1:36.89	2:59.04	23
Sabina Panzanini	Giant Slalom	1:20.97	1:33.12	2:54.09	8
Deborah Compagnoni	Giant Slalom	1:18.94	1:31.65	2:50.59	1st place, gold medalist(s)
Elisabetta Biavaschi	Slalom	DNF	–	DNF	–
Lara Magoni	Slalom	48.13	48.50	1:36.63	15
Morena Gallizio	Slalom	46.93	47.94	1:34.87	8
Deborah Compagnoni	Slalom	45.29	47.17	1:32.46	2nd place, silver medalist(s)

Women's combined

Athlete	Downhill	Slalom		Total	
Athlete	Time	Time 1	Time 2	Total time	Rank
Morena Gallizio	1:30.60	36.83	35.09	2:42.52	5
Bibiana Perez	1:30.54	DNF	–	DNF	–

== Biathlon ==
Men

Event	Athlete	Misses ^{1}	Time	Rank
10 km Sprint	René Cattarinussi	4	30:50.0	52
10 km Sprint	Hubert Leitgeb	1	30:10.0	35
10 km Sprint	Wilfried Pallhuber	1	28:50.1	14
10 km Sprint	Pieralberto Carrara	2	28:44.2	10

Event	Athlete	Time	Misses	Adjusted time ^{2}	Rank
20 km	Patrick Favre	57:10.5	7	1'04:10.5	54
20 km	Wilfried Pallhuber	57:07.7	5	1'02:07.7	41
20 km	René Cattarinussi	57:00.5	3	1'00:00.5	21
20 km	Pieralberto Carrara	56:21.9	0	56:21.9	2nd place, silver medalist(s)

Men's 4 × 7.5 km relay

Athletes	Race		
Athletes	Misses ^{1}	Time	Rank
Patrick Favre; Wilfried Pallhuber; René Cattarinussi; Pieralberto Carrara	1	1'25:07.3	9

Women

Event	Athlete	Misses ^{1}	Time	Rank
7.5 km Sprint	Nathalie Santer	1	23:59.6	10

Event	Athlete	Time	Misses	Adjusted time ^{2}	Rank
15 km	Nathalie Santer	54:01.0	4	58:01.0	18

^{1} A penalty loop of 150 metres had to be skied per missed target.
^{2} One minute added per missed target.

== Bobsleigh ==
Sled	Athletes	Event	Run 1		Run 2		Run 3		Run 4		Total	
Sled	Athletes	Event	Time	Rank	Time	Rank	Time	Rank	Time	Rank	Time	Rank
ITA-1	Günther Huber; Antonio Tartaglia	Two-man	54.51	1	54.29	2	54.17	3	54.27	2	3:37.24	1st place, gold medalist(s)
ITA-2	Fabrizio Tosini; Enrico Costa	Two-man	55.07	13	54.79	13	54.80	14	54.95	15	3:39.61	14

Sled	Athletes	Event	Run 1		Run 2		Run 3		Total	
Sled	Athletes	Event	Time	Rank	Time	Rank	Time	Rank	Time	Rank
ITA-1	Günther Huber; Antonio Tartaglia; Massimiliano Rota; Marco Menchini	Four-man	53.84	16	53.68	12	53.91	12	2:41.43	14
ITA-2	Fabrizio Tosini; Andrea Pais de Libera; Enrico Costa; Sergio Chianella	Four-man	54.07	20	54.09	20	54.86	22	2:43.02	20

== Cross-country skiing ==
Men

Event	Athlete	Race	
Event	Athlete	Time	Rank
10 km C	Fabio Maj	29:13.8	28
10 km C	Marco Albarello	29:10.1	26
10 km C	Fulvio Valbusa	28:17.0	11
10 km C	Silvio Fauner	28:15.5	10
15 km pursuit^{1} F	Fabio Maj	41:31.4	13
15 km pursuit^{1} F	Fulvio Valbusa	40:25.1	5
15 km pursuit^{1} F	Silvio Fauner	40:24.9	4
30 km C	Giorgio Di Centa	1'38:14.9	8
30 km C	Marco Albarello	1'38:07.1	7
30 km C	Fulvio Valbusa	1'37:31.1	5
30 km C	Silvio Fauner	1'36:08.5	3rd place, bronze medalist(s)
50 km F	Pietro Piller Cottrer	2'12:37.9	16
50 km F	Silvio Fauner	2'08:44.3	10
50 km F	Maurizio Pozzi	2'08:13.2	9
50 km F	Fulvio Valbusa	2'06:44.3	5

^{1} Starting delay based on 10 km results.
C = Classical style, F = Freestyle

Men's 4 × 10 km relay

Athletes	Race	
Athletes	Time	Rank
Marco Albarello; Fulvio Valbusa; Fabio Maj; Silvio Fauner	1'40:55.9	2nd place, silver medalist(s)

Women

Event	Athlete	Race	
Event	Athlete	Time	Rank
5 km C	Sabina Valbusa	19:00.6	29
5 km C	Manuela Di Centa	18:48.9	21
5 km C	Stefania Belmondo	18:19.8	12
5 km C	Gabriella Paruzzi	18:14.7	9
10 km pursuit^{2} F	Manuela Di Centa	30:47.1	23
10 km pursuit^{2} F	Sabina Valbusa	30:34.0	17
10 km pursuit^{2} F	Gabriella Paruzzi	29:36.8	12
10 km pursuit^{2} F	Stefania Belmondo	28:42.6	5
15 km C	Karin Moroder	51:36.1	30
15 km C	Antonella Confortola	51:07.6	27
15 km C	Gabriella Paruzzi	49:20.7	14
15 km C	Stefania Belmondo	48:57.7	8
30 km F	Karin Moroder	DNF	–
30 km F	Antonella Confortola	1'29:31.6	20
30 km F	Gabriella Paruzzi	1'26:06.0	10
30 km F	Stefania Belmondo	1'22:11.7	2nd place, silver medalist(s)

^{2} Starting delay based on 5 km results.
C = Classical style, F = Freestyle

Women's 4 × 5 km relay

Athletes	Race	
Athletes	Time	Rank
Karin Moroder; Gabriella Paruzzi; Manuela Di Centa; Stefania Belmondo	56:53.3	3rd place, bronze medalist(s)

== Figure skating ==
Men

Athlete	SP	FS	TFP	Rank
Gilberto Viadana	24	23	35.0	23

Women

Athlete	SP	FS	TFP	Rank
Tony Sabrina Bombardieri	27	DNF	DNF	–

Ice Dancing

Athletes	CD1	CD2	OD	FD	TFP	Rank
Diane Gerencser; Pasquale Camerlengo	16	17	16	17	33.2	17
Barbara Fusar-Poli; Maurizio Margaglio	6	6	6	6	12.0	6

== Freestyle skiing ==
Men

Athlete	Event	Qualification		Final	
Athlete	Event	Points	Rank	Points	Rank
Freddy Romano	Aerials	195.38	14	did not advance	

Women

Athlete	Event	Qualification			Final		
Athlete	Event	Time	Points	Rank	Time	Points	Rank
Petra Moroder	Moguls	36.35	19.30	22	did not advance		

== Ice hockey ==
=== Men's tournament ===
==== Preliminary round - group A ====
Top team (shaded) advanced to the first round.

Team	GP	W	L	T	GF	GA	GD	Pts
Kazakhstan	3	2	0	1	14	11	+3	5
Slovakia	3	1	1	1	9	9	0	3
Italy	3	1	2	0	11	11	0	2
Austria	3	0	1	2	9	12	-3	2

All times are local (UTC-7).

7 February 1998	Kazakhstan	5 – 3 (1-3, 1-0, 3-0)	Italy	The Big Hat/ Aqua Wing Arena, Nagano, Japan; Attendance: 8,634

8 February 1998	Slovakia	4 – 3 (1-2, 3-1, 0-0)	Italy	The Big Hat/ Aqua Wing Arena, Nagano, Japan; Attendance: 8,620

10 February 1998	Italy	5 – 2 (2-0, 2-0, 1-2)	Austria	The Big Hat/ Aqua Wing Arena, Nagano, Japan; Attendance: 8,473

==== Consolation Round - 11th place match ====
All times are local (UTC-7).

12 February 1998	France	5 – 1 (1-0, 0-0, 4-1)	Italy 12th	The Big Hat/ Aqua Wing Arena, Nagano, Japan; Attendance: 8,854

Team roster

  - Dino Felicetti
  - Bruno Zarrillo
  - Stephan Figliuzzi
  - Gates Orlando
  - Mario Chitaroni
  - Leo Insam
  - Maurizio Mansi
  - Bob Nardella
  - Roland Ramoser
  - Joe Busillo
  - Mario Brunetta
  - Markus Brunner
  - Robert Oberrauch
  - Mike Rosati
  - Lucio Topatigh
  - Michael De Angelis
  - Christopher Bartolone
  - Chad Biafore
  - Patrick Brugnoli
  - Martin Pavlu
  - Lawrence Rucchin
  - Stefano Margoni
- Head coach: Adolf Insam

== Luge ==
Men

Athlete	Run 1		Run 2		Run 3		Run 4		Total	
Athlete	Time	Rank	Time	Rank	Time	Rank	Time	Rank	Time	Rank
Reinhold Rainer	50.105	8	50.008	9	49.897	5	49.936	8	3:19.946	8
Norbert Huber	50.100	7	50.129	11	50.026	10	49.883	6	3:20.138	10
Armin Zöggeler	49.715	2	49.690	2	49.737	3	49.797	3	3:18.939	2nd place, silver medalist(s)

(Men's) Doubles

Athletes	Run 1		Run 2		Total	
Athletes	Time	Rank	Time	Rank	Time	Rank
Kurt Brugger; Wilfried Huber	50.897	5	50.871	8	1:41.768	5
Gerhard Plankensteiner; Oswald Haselrieder	51.084	6	50.833	7	1:41.917	6

Women

Athlete	Run 1		Run 2		Run 3		Run 4		Total	
Athlete	Time	Rank	Time	Rank	Time	Rank	Time	Rank	Time	Rank
Doris Preindl	52.178	15	52.107	16	51.638	15	55.373	28	3:31.296	26
Natalie Obkircher	51.910	11	51.967	12	51.530	13	51.270	11	3:26.677	12
Gerda Weissensteiner	51.744	8	51.998	13	51.415	10	50.956	9	3:26.113	9

== Nordic combined ==
Men's individual

Events:

- normal hill ski jumping
- 15 km cross-country skiing (Start delay, based on ski jumping results.)

Athlete	Event	Ski Jumping		Cross-country time	Total rank
Athlete	Event	Points	Rank	Cross-country time	Total rank
Andrea Longo	Individual	199.0	30	45:26.2	22

== Short track speed skating ==
Men

Athlete	Event	Round one		Quarter finals		Semi finals		Finals	
Athlete	Event	Time	Rank	Time	Rank	Time	Rank	Time	Final rank
Maurizio Carnino	500 m	43.927	2 Q	43.225	4	did not advance			
Fabio Carta	500 m	43.000	1 Q	43.763	3	did not advance			
Fabio Carta	1000 m	1:31.315	2 Q	1:32.358	1 Q	1:39.402	3 QB	1:33.015	6
Michele Antonioli	1000 m	DSQ	–	did not advance					
Michele Antonioli; Maurizio Carnino; Fabio Carta; Diego Cattani; Nicola Franceschina	5000 m relay					7:07.770	2 QA	7:15.212	4

Women

Athlete	Event	Round one		Quarter finals		Semi finals		Finals	
Athlete	Event	Time	Rank	Time	Rank	Time	Rank	Time	Final rank
Barbara Baldissera	500 m	46.113	3	did not advance					
Marinella Canclini	500 m	1:14.224	4	did not advance					
Mara Urbani	500 m	46.287	2 Q	46.215	1 Q	46.473	4 QB	46.687	5
Marinella Canclini	1000 m	1:35.971	2 Q	1:38.517	4	did not advance			
Katia Colturi	1000 m	1:39.937	3	did not advance					
Mara Urbani	1000 m	1:39.231	3	did not advance					

== Ski jumping ==
Athlete	Event	Jump 1			Jump 2		Total	
Athlete	Event	Distance	Points	Rank	Distance	Points	Points	Rank
Roberto Cecon	Normal hill	75.5	85.0	32	did not advance			
Roberto Cecon	Large hill	116.0	109.8	14 Q	116.0	107.8	217.6	22

== Snowboarding ==
Men's giant slalom

Athlete	Race 1	Race 2	Total	
Athlete	Time	Time	Time	Rank
Karl Frenademez	1:03.33	1:12.62	2:15.95	20
Willi Trakofler	1:01.42	1:05.88	2:07.30	11
Elmar Messner	1:01.42	1:07.99	2:09.41	13
Thomas Prugger	59.38	1:04.60	2:03.98	2nd place, silver medalist(s)

Women's giant slalom

Athlete	Race 1	Race 2	Total	
Athlete	Time	Time	Time	Rank
Margherita Parini	1:21.42	1:06.15	2:27.57	13
Dagi Mair unter der Eggen	1:13.35	1:09.07	2:22.42	7
Marion Posch	1:13.32	1:08.02	2:21.34	6
Lidia Trettel	1:11.68	1:08.03	2:19.71	4

Women's halfpipe

Athlete	Qualifying round 1		Qualifying round 2		Final	
Athlete	Points	Rank	Points	Rank	Points	Rank
Alessandra Pescosta	22.8	24	18.9	20	did not advance	

== Speed skating ==
Men

Event	Athlete	Race 1		Race 2		Total	
Event	Athlete	Time	Rank	Time	Rank	Time	Rank
500 m	Davide Carta	37.11	34	36.80	27	73.91	30
500 m	Ermanno Ioriatti	36.30	10	36.36	12	72.66	9
1000 m	Ermanno Ioriatti					1:12.83	27
1000 m	Davide Carta					1:12.27	14
1500 m	Ermanno Ioriatti					1:52.45	24
1500 m	Davide Carta					1:52.44	23
5000 m	Roberto Sighel					6:38.33	9
10,000 m	Roberto Sighel					13:46.85	9

Women

Event	Athlete	Race	
Event	Athlete	Time	Rank
3000 m	Elena Belci	4:16.62	11
5000 m	Elena Belci	7:15.58	9
