= Bergamelli =

Bergamelli is an Italian surname. Notable people with the surname include:

- Dario Bergamelli (born 1987), Italian footballer
- Giancarlo Bergamelli (born 1974), Italian former alpine skier
- Monica Bergamelli (born 1984), Italian artistic gymnast
- Norman Bergamelli (born 1971), Italian former alpine skier
- Sergio Bergamelli (born 1970), Italian former alpine skier
