= Senoner =

Senoner is a surname. Notable people with the surname include:

- Carlo Senoner (born 1943), Italian alpine skier
- Inge Senoner (1940-2007), Italian alpine skier
- Simona Senoner (1993–2011), Italian cross-country racer and ski jumper
- Tobia Senoner (1913–1980), Italian cross-country skier
- Wilfried Senoner (1945–1999), Italian artist
