= Marsaglia (surname) =

Marsaglia is an Italian surname, presumably originating in the name of Marsaglia, a commune in Piedmont. People with this surname include:

- George Marsaglia (1924–2011), American mathematician
- Matteo Marsaglia (born 1985), Italian ski racer
- Francesca Marsaglia (born 1990), Italian ski racer
- Lorenzo Marsaglia (born 1996), Italian diver
