= Magoni =

Magoni is an Italian surname. Notable people with the surname include:

- Lara Magoni (born 1969), Italian alpine skier and politician
- Paoletta Magoni (born 1964), Italian alpine skier
