= Nogler =

Nogler is a surname. Notable people with the surname include:

- Ermanno Nogler (1921–2000), Italian alpine skier
- Hans Nogler (1919–2011), Italian alpine skier, brother of Sophie
- Lotte Nogler (born 1947), Italian alpine skier
- Sophie Nogler (1924–2015), Austrian alpine skier, sister of Hans
