= Foppa =

Foppa is a surname. Notable people with the surname include:

- Alaíde Foppa, feminist writer
- Cristoforo Foppa (1445–c.1527), Italian goldsmith, sculptor, and die sinker
- Giovan Battista Foppa (1603–1673), Italian prelate of the Roman Catholic Church
- Giuseppe Maria Foppa (1760–1845), Italian librettist
- Juan Francisco Solórzano Foppa (1983–2026), Guatemalan functionary and politician
- Pauletta Foppa (born 2000), French handball player
- Riccardo Foppa (born 1961), Italian ski racer
- Vincenzo Foppa, an influential 15th-century Italian painter

== See also ==
- The nickname of Peter Forsberg, a Swedish ice hockey player
