= Tiziano Bieller =

Italian alpine skier

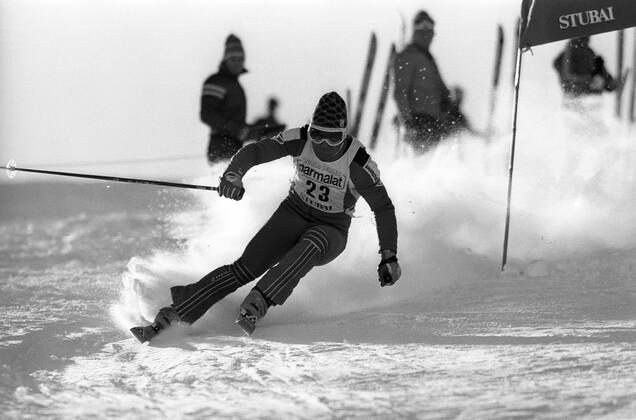

Personal information
- Born: 22 February 1956 (age 70) Aosta, Italy
- Height: 1.76 m (5 ft 9 in)

Skiing career
- Sport: Alpine skiing
- Retired: 1980
- Disciplines: Technical events
- World Cup debut: 1973

World Cup
- Seasons: 4
Medal record
Junior World Championships
Bronze medal – third place	1973 Ruhpolding	Giant slalom

Tiziano Bieller (born 22 February 1956) is a former Italian alpine skier.

Originally from Champoluc, he is not a relative of the former alpine skiers Franco Bieler and Wanda Bieler, in turn cousins between them, among other things his surname is written with a double L even if in many places it is wrongly spelled with only one.

== Career ==
During his career he has won an overall national title in giant slalom in 1980 and was a member of the Italy national alpine ski team, in the 1970s and 1980s known as the blue avalanche (in Italian language valanga azzurra), with which national A participated in the entire 1980 World Cup season.

He was 2nd in the overall standings of the 1980 FIS Alpine Ski Europa Cup but won the discipline standings of giant slalom.

== Europa Cup results ==
Bieller has won one discipline cup.

- FIS Alpine Ski Europa Cup
  - Giant slalom: 1980

== National titles ==
Bieller has won one national championships at individual senior level.

- Italian Alpine Ski Championships
  - Giant slalom: 1980
