= Fulvia Stevenin =

Italian alpine skier (born 1965)

Fulvia Stevenin (born 18 October 1965) is a former Italian alpine ski racer. She competed primarily in the slalom and giant slalom events. At the age of 18, she participated in the 1984 Sarajevo Winter Olympics, competing in both technical races but failing to finish either event. In the slalom event, she was notably competing alongside her friend and roommate, Paola Magoni-Sforza, who went on to win the race. Both athletes were coached by Toni Morandi and represented the Gressoney Ski Club.

In the FIS World Cup, Stevenin achieved her best results with two 12th-place finishes, one in the slalom at Piancavallo, Italy, on 17 December 1982, and the other in the giant slalom at Santa Caterina Valfurva, Italy, on 18 December 1984.

Nationally, Stevenin was a dominant force in giant slalom, winning the Italian National Championship title three times, in 1983, 1985, and 1987. She retired from competitive skiing at the age of 22 in 1987.
