= Unterkircher =

Unterkircher is a surname. Notable people with the surname include:

- Hans Unterkircher (1894–1971), Austrian stage and film actor
- Karl Unterkircher (1970–2008), Italian mountaineer
