= Gius =

Gius is a surname that appears to be associated with Italy, specifically the Trentino-Alto Adige/Südtirol region that was annexed by Italy from Austria-Hungary in 1919. Anecdotal evidence suggests that the native pronunciation of the surname was similar to "juice" and that at least one Americanization of the surname was pronounced "guy—us".

The Gius surname is shared by several notable people:

- Julius Gius (1911–1996), an American newspaper editor
- Nicole Gius (born 1980), an Italian alpine skier
- Augusto Giustozzi, popularly known as Gius (1927–2001), an Argentine screenwriter, cartoonist, lyricist and playwright.

== Distribution ==
The "Gius" surname has a small presence in both the United States and England based on historical census records. New York City passenger ship manifests from 1880 to 1891 indicate a slow trickle of immigration during the period punctuated by a many-fold spike in 1890. The US Census of 1880 shows a concentration of persons sharing the "Gius" surname in Pennsylvania and South Carolina. The contemporaneous 1891 Census of the United Kingdom shows a concentration of "Gaius" families in the county of Essex on the eastern coast of England. Forty years later, in the US Census of 1920, a dispersal of the surname across fourteen states (including Alaska) had taken place.
