= Cristina Tisot =

Italian alpine skier

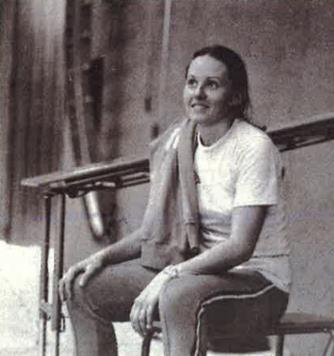
- Cristina Tisot in 1976.

Personal information
- Born: 23 August 1954 (age 71) Fiera di Primiero, Italy

Skiing career
- Sport: Alpine skiing
- Retired: 1976
- Disciplines: Polyvalent
- World Cup debut: 1973

World Championships
- Teams: 1
- Medals: 0

World Cup
- Seasons: 4
- Podiums: 1

Cristina Tisot married Arrigoni (born 23 August 1954) is a former Italian World Cup alpine ski racer who was 6th in downhill at the World Ski Championships 1974.

== Biography ==
Cristina Tisot had a short but intense skiing career which ended prematurely due to injury, at the age of only 22, on the eve of the 1976 Winter Olympics in which she would have participated. In 1973 she married her coach Franco Arrigoni.

== World Cup results ==
=== Race podiums ===
- 1 podiums - (1 GS)

Season	Date	Location	Discipline	Place
1975	23 Feb 1975	Naeba, Japan	Giant slalom	3rd

== World Championship results ==
Year
Year	Age	Slalom	Giant; Slalom	Downhill	Combined
1974	19	DNF	13	6	DNF

== National titles ==
In her short career Tisot has won two national titles.

- Italian Alpine Ski Championships
  - Slalom: 1974
  - Giant slalom: 1975
