= Carraretto =

Carraretto is a surname. Notable people with the surname include:

- Marco Carraretto (born 1977), Italian basketball player
- Renata Carraretto (1923–2000), Italian alpine skier
