= World Junior Alpine Skiing Championships 2026 =

2026 skiing competition

45th FIS Alpine Junior World Ski Championships
- Location: Narvik, Norway
- Dates: 5–15 March

The 2026 World Junior Alpine Skiing Championships were held at Narvik in Norway from 5 to 15 March 2026. It was the sixth time that a World Junior Alpine Skiing Championship was held in Norway after the editions in 1987, 1991, 1995, 2015 and 2020.

== Medal summary ==
=== Men's events ===
Event	Gold		Silver		Bronze	
Downhill	Cancelled					
Super-G	Victor Haghighat; France	40.36	Sandro Manser; Switzerland	40.39	Jake Kertesz-Knight; Canada	40.57
Team Alpine Combined	France; Victor Haghighat; Nash Huot-Marchand	1:17.26	United States; Aksel Lindenmeyr; Jevin Palmquist	1:17.43	Norway; Sebastian Espen Bengston; Rasmus Bakkevig	1:17.47
Giant Slalom	Rasmus Bakkevig; Norway	2:08.91	Jarand Husby Haugen; Norway	2:09.07	Aleix Aubert Serracanta; Spain	2:09.21
Slalom	Giuliano Fux; Switzerland	1:43.63	Freddy Carrick-Smith; Great Britain	1:43.96	Maximilien Hoder; United States	1:44.08

=== Ladies events ===
Event	Gold		Silver		Bronze	
Downhill	Cancelled					
Super-G	Emy Charbonnier; France	47.96	Logan Grosdidier; United States	48.37	Pia Hauzenberger; Austria	48.48
Team Alpine Combined	France; Emy Charbonnier; Ilona Charbotel	1:28.76	Italy; Ludovica Righi; Anna Trocker	1:29.14	Austria; Pia Hauzenberger; Leonie Raich	1:29.28
Giant Slalom	Anna Trocker; Italy	2:04.04	Elisabeth Bocock; United States	2:05.41	Tatum Bieler; Italy	2:05.79
Slalom	Anna Trocker; Italy	1:51.59	Leonie Raich; Austria	1:53.88	Aada Kanto; Finland	1:55.37

=== Mixed events ===
Event	Gold	Silver	Bronze
Team parallel	Sweden; Esther Nordberg; William Hällqvist; Moa Landström; Alexander Ax Swartz	Finland; Wilma Kivelä; Altti Pyrrö; Kia Suni; Jasper Palosaari	Switzerland; Dania Allenbach; Giuliano Fux; Sue Piller; Jack Spencer

=== Medal table ===
* Host nation (Norway)

Rank	Nation	Gold	Silver	Bronze	Total
1	France	4	0	0	4
2	Italy	2	1	1	4
3	Norway*	1	1	1	3
3	Switzerland	1	1	1	3
5	Sweden	1	0	0	1
6	United States	0	3	1	4
7	Austria	0	1	2	3
8	Finland	0	1	1	2
9	Great Britain	0	1	0	1
10	Canada	0	0	1	1
10	Spain	0	0	1	1
Totals (11 entries)		9	9	9	27
