= Severino Menardi =

Italian alpine skier

Personal information
- Born: 9 November 1910 Cortina d'Ampezzo, Italy
- Died: 13 January 1978 (aged 67) Cortina d'Ampezzo, Italy

Skiing career
- Sport: Alpine skiing
- Club: Sci Club Cortina; G.S. Fiamme Gialle
- Retired: 1935
- Disciplines: Polyvalent

Olympics
- Teams: 1
- Medals: 0

World Championships
- Teams: 2
- Medals: 0

Severino Menardi (9 November 1910 – 13 January 1978) was an Italian cross-country skier, Nordic combined skier, and ski jumper who competed in the 1932 Winter Olympics and in the 1936 Winter Olympics. He was born in Cortina d'Ampezzo.

== Biography ==
In 1932 he finished 21st in the Nordic combined event and 27th in the ski jumping competition. He also participated in the 18 km cross-country skiing event and finished 34th. Four years later he was a member of the Italian relay team which finished fourth in the 4x10 km relay competition. In the 18 km event he finished 16th and in the Nordic combined event he finished 20th.

== Achievements ==
=== Alpine skiing ===
==== National titles ====
Menardi won five national titles.

- Italian Alpine Ski Championships
  - Downhill: 1931, 1935 (2)
  - Slalom: 1931 (1)
  - Combined: 1931, 1935 (2)

=== Cross-country skiing ===
- 1933: 2nd, Italian men's championships of cross-country skiing, 18 km
- 1935: 3rd, Italian men's championships of cross-country skiing, 18 km
- 1938: 1st, Italian men's championships of cross-country skiing, 18 km

=== Nordic combined ===
- 1933: 1st, Italian championships of Nordic combined skiing
- 1934: 1st, Italian championships of Nordic combined skiing
- 1936: 1st, Italian championships of Nordic combined skiing
