= Wilfried Senoner =

Italian artist (1945–1999)

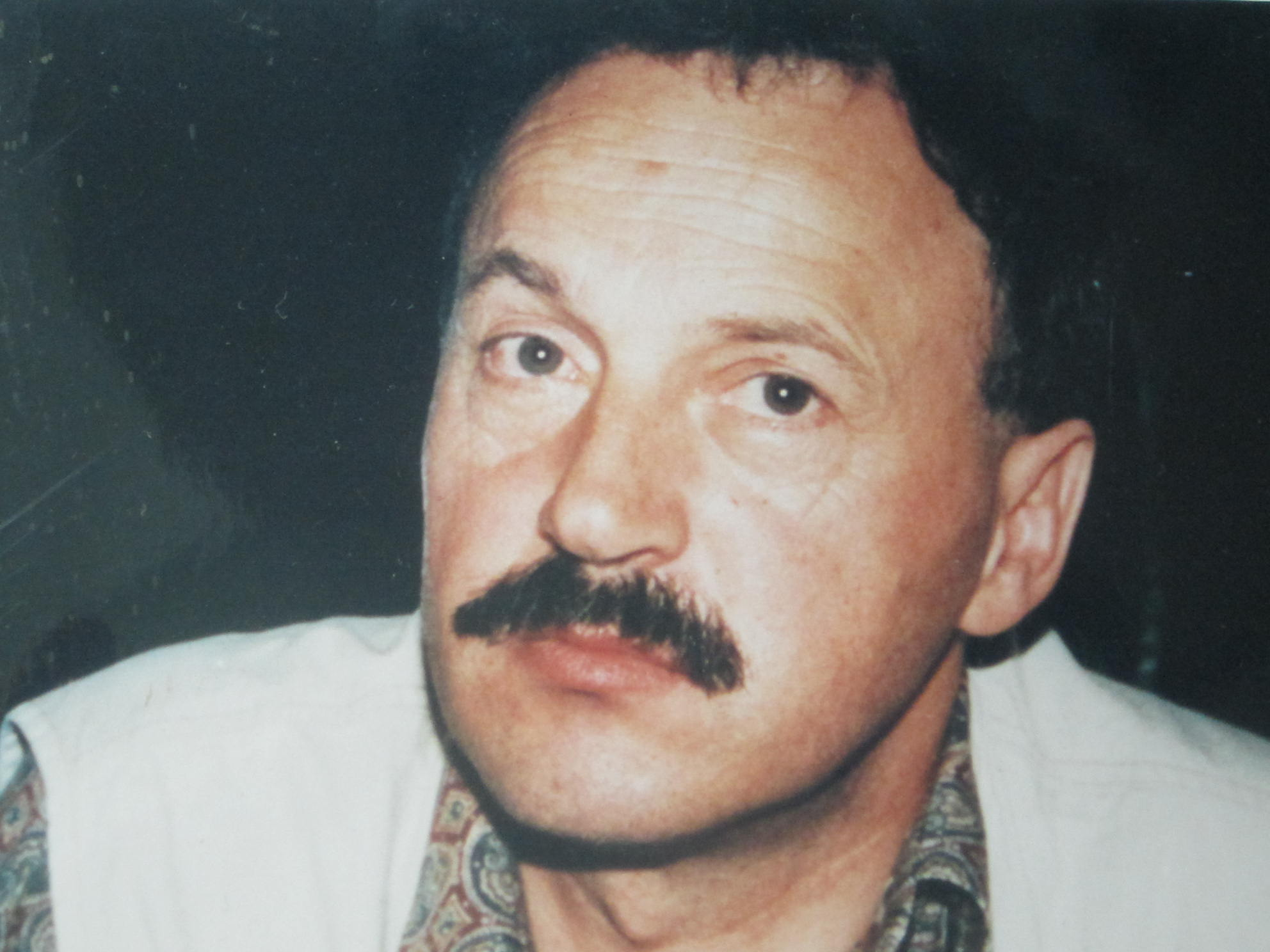
- Born: 20 January 1945; Urtijëi
- Died: 26 March 1999 (aged 54)
- Occupation: Italian artist

Wilfried Senoner (20 January 1945 – 26 March 1999) was an Italian artist.

== Education ==
Wilfried Senoner was born in Urtijëi, son of the sculptor Gabriel Senoner. Thus, from his early childhood on, he was well acquainted with the art of carving. After graduating from the Urtijëi Art School, he continued to improve his skills in his father's workshop. From 1964 to 1968 he studied at the Brera Academy in Milan with the well known professors Francesco Messina, Marino Marini and Alik Cavaliere. He graduated from the academy with first-class degrees in sculpture and art history.

== Early career ==
During his stay in Milan he met with many artists and being a regular visitor to their workshops he discovered his love for painting. From 1972 to 1974 Wilfried worked with an architect in Augsburg, Germany. Meanwhile he published a pocket book of satirical cartoons "Wirr Warr", for which he got a prize. Back in Italy, he started a ten-year-long career as art teacher at different schools in Urtijëi and Sëlva.

== Art years ==
In 1984 he decided to settle down as a freelance artist. His oevre expresses his versatility and taste for experimenting with different techniques, like fresco painting on houses and church facades or enamel painting for the restoration of altars etc. In Germany he created huge altars in various styles (ranging from Gothic to modern art). From 1967 on, he exhibited his works in either individual or collective exhibitions and participated in competitions, where he won a number of awards. In his last years of life, previous to his fatal skiing accident, he worked at a frenetic pace on a multitude of projects in Italy and abroad.

His works are to be seen in churches all over Europe. Some of the biggest altars are situated in Germany, like:

- 1984/5 Schönbrunn, church design

1985/7 Main altar and people's altar in Bogen (8m)

- 1986/7 Main altar and people's altar in Eschenbach (14m)

Eschenbach Parish

- 1985/90 interior church design in Rothenkirchen (15m x 9m)

1988 2 side altars in Pollenfeld (7m)

== Single exhibitions ==
- 1967 Circolo Artistico, Urtijëi – pittura e scultura
- 1972 Piccola Galleria, Brescia – pittura e scultura
- 1972 Galleria Willy, Vilpian – scultura
- 1972 Circolo Artistico, Urtijëi – scultura all’aperto
- 1980 Galleria Piccinini, Cortina d’Ampezzo – quadri tridimensionali1984 Galleria Mazzini 3, Montecchio di Pesaro – scultura e grafica
- 1985 Circolo Artistico, Urtijëi – (con Heini Unterhofer) – colore e suono
- 1987 Atelier Rudi Oberrauch, Bolzano - scultura
- 1987 Galerie Pobitzer, Merano – scultura e grafica
- 1989 Galleria Michelangelo, Firenze - pittura
- 1989 Galleria S. Francesco, Assisi – scultura1990 Scuola elementare, St. Magdalena/Villnöß - pittura

== Collective exhibitions ==
- 1966 Palazzo Comunale, Abbiategrasso - grafica
- 1967 Galleria Permanente, Milan - scultura
- 1968 Galleria delle Ore, Milan – grafica e scultura
- 1970 Erste Kunstgalerie, Gersthofen/Augsburg – scultura
- 1972 Stadtturmgalerie, Innsbruck – grafica
- 1973 „Die große Schwäbische“, Augsburg – pittura tridimensionale
- 1975 Piccola Galleria, Brescia – scultura
- 1977 Ruhrland Museum, Essen – scultura
- 1978 Circolo Artistico, Urtijëi – scultura all’aperto
- 1979 Circolo Artistico, Urtijëi – scultura e grafica1981 Palais Palffy, Vienna – pittura tridimensionale
- 1981 Galleria Bevilacqua la Masa, Palazzo Correr, Venezia
- 1983 Expo Arte, Bari – scultura e pittura
- 1984 Circolo Artistico, Urtijëi – scultura
- 1984 Galleria Mazzini 3, Montecchio di Pesaro – scultura
- 1986 Galleria Museo, Bolzano – concorso di scultura
- 1987 Kunstgalerie, Bolzano – concorso di pittura
- 1989 Galerie Prisma, Bolzano – concorso di scultura
- 1989 Palazzo Comunale, Assisi – scultura1990 Centro culturale, Pietralba - scultura
- 1990 Centro culturale, Pineta di Laives – scultura
- 1990 Palazzo Gementi, Bardolino - scultura
- 1994 Arena, Verona - scultura1995 Collegio Cairoli, Pavia - scultura
- 1996 Trostburg Castle - scultura
