= Matilde Lorenzi =

Italian alpine skier (2004–2024)

Personal information
- Born: 15 November 2004; Turin, Piedmont, Italy
- Died: 28 October 2024 (aged 19); Bolzano, South Tyrol, Italy
- Occupation: Alpine skier

Skiing career
- Disciplines: Downhill, super-G
- Club: CS Esercito

Matilde Lorenzi (15 November 2004 – 28 October 2024) was an Italian alpine ski racer.

== Biography ==
Born in Turin and raised in hometown Valgioie, Matilde Lorenzi began skiing at a young age alongside her sister, Lucrezia, also an international alpine skier. To support their training, the Lorenzi family relocated to Sestriere, where Matilde and Lucrezia honed their skills with the Sci Club Sestriere before joining the Centro Sportivo Esercito (the sports club of the Italian Army).

In the 2023–24 season, Lorenzi achieved significant milestones, including winning the Italian national titles in both the élite and junior categories in super-G at Sarntal. She also secured a sixth-place finish in downhill and eighth in super-G at the Junior World Championships in Châtel, Haute-Savoie. Her best race result in the Europa Cup was an eleventh-place finish in super-G at St. Moritz in December 2023.

On 28 October 2024, during a giant slalom training session on the Grawand G1 slope in Schnalstal (South Tyrol), Lorenzi suffered a severe fall. She lost control of her skis and was ejected outside the slope, resulting in a violent impact with the icy surface. Despite prompt medical attention and being airlifted to the hospital in Bolzano, she succumbed to her injuries during the night. Lorenzi was 19.

After the funeral service, held in Giaveno on 31 October 2024, Lorenzi was buried in Valgioie cemetery.

== Europa Cup results ==
- Best overall ranking: 81st in 2024

== National titles ==
- Italian Alpine Ski Championships
  - Super-G: 2024
