= Franco Bieler =

Italian alpine skier

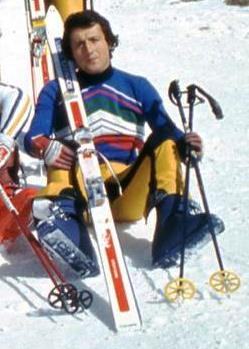
- Bieler in 1973 in Gressoney.

Personal information
- Born: 6 December 1950 (age 75) Gressoney-Saint-Jean, Italy

Skiing career
- Sport: Alpine skiing
- Retired: 1978
- Disciplines: Technical events
- World Cup debut: 1973

Olympics
- Teams: 1

World Championships
- Teams: 1

World Cup
- Seasons: 6
- Wins: 1
- Podiums: 3
Medal record
Men's alpine skiing
Representing Italy
World Cup race podiums
Event	1st	2nd	3rd
Slalom	0	1	1
Giant slalom	1	0	0
Parallel	1	0	0
Total	2	1	1

Franco Bieler (born 6 December 1950) is an Italian former alpine skier.

He is the cousin of the alpine skier Wanda Bieler but not relative with the other alpine skier Tiziano Bieller.

== Career ==
During his career he has achieved 22 results among the top 10 (3 podiums + 1 in a parallel slalom in the Nation Cup of the World Cup 1976) in the World Cup.

He competed in the 1976 Winter Olympics.

== World Cup results ==
Podiums

Date	Place	Discipline	Rank
20-03-1977	(Sweden) Åre	Slalom	2
16-01-1977	(Austria) Kitzbuehel	Slalom	3
18-01-1976	(France) Morzine	Giant slalom	1
