= Claudia Riegler =

Claudia Riegler may refer to:

- Claudia Riegler (snowboarder) (born 1973), Austrian snowboarder
- Claudia Riegler (skier) (born 1976), Austrian-born New Zealand alpine skier
