= Matteo Marsaglia =

Italian alpine skier

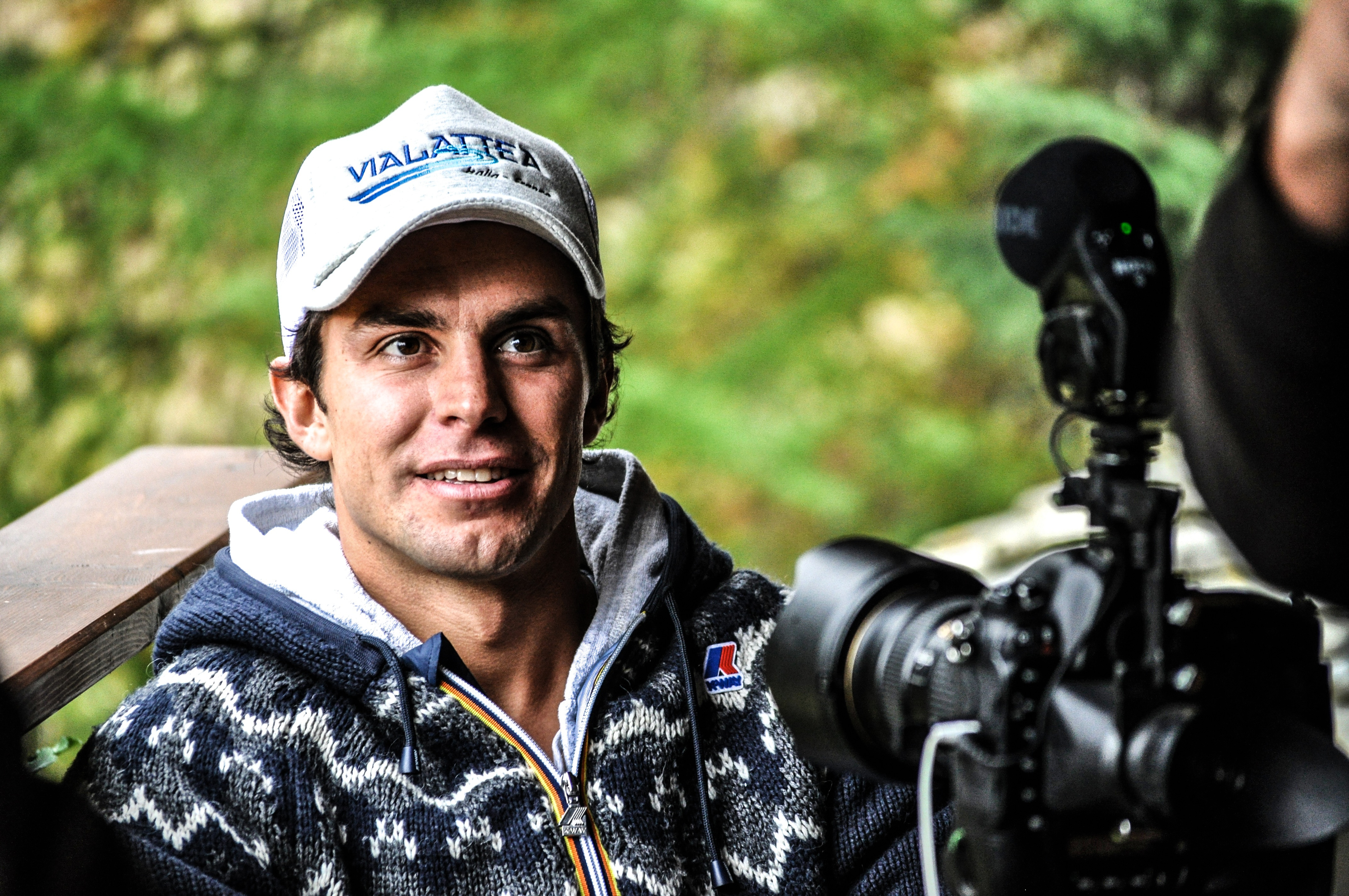
- October 2014

Personal information
- Born: 5 October 1985 (age 40) Rome, Italy
- Height: 1.80 m (5 ft 11 in)

Skiing career
- Sport: Alpine skiing
- Club: C.S. Esercito
- Disciplines: Super-G, Downhill, Combined
- World Cup debut: February 3, 2008 (age 22)

Olympics
- Teams: 2 – (2018, 2022)
- Medals: 0

World Championships
- Teams: 6 – (2011, 2013, 2015, 2019, 2021, 2023)
- Medals: 0

World Cup
- Seasons: 11 – (2008, 2011–16, 2018–21)
- Wins: 1 – (1 SG)
- Podiums: 2 – (2 SG)
- Overall titles: 0 – (27th in 2013)
- Discipline titles: 0 – (2nd in SG, 2013)

Matteo Marsaglia (born 5 October 1985 in Rome) is a World Cup alpine ski racer from Italy and specializes in the speed events of downhill and super-G.

== Biography ==
Marsaglia made his World Cup debut in February 2008 in France. His first World Cup podium was a victory, in the Super-G at Beaver Creek, Colorado, in December 2012.

He is the brother of fellow alpine racer Francesca Marsaglia.

== World Cup results ==
=== Season standings ===
Season	Age	Overall	Slalom	Giant Slalom	Super G	Downhill	Combined
2008	22	126	—	—	—	—	42
2009	23	did not compete					
2010	24	did not compete					
2011	25	63	—	—	40	35	16
2012	26	46	—	—	16	45	14
2013	27	27	—	—	2	51	—
2014	28	83	—	40	30	51	—
2015	29	57	—	—	16	49	29
2016	30	57	—	—	36	30	—
2017	31	injured					
2018	32	126	—	—	—	43	—
2019	33	75	—	—	30	28	—
2020	34	90	—	—	41	34	—
2021	35	74	—	—	36	27	—N/a
2022	36	51	—	—	37	17	—N/a
2023	37	60	—	—	31	35	—N/a

Standings through 5 February 2023

=== Race podiums ===
- 1 win - (1 SG)
- 2 podiums - (2 SG); 18 top tens (10 SG, 5 DH, 3 AC)

Season	Date	Location	Discipline	Place
2013	1 Dec 2012	(United States) Beaver Creek, USA	Super-G	1st
2013	14 Dec 2012	Val Gardena, Italy	Super-G	2nd

== World Championship results ==
Year	Age	Slalom	Giant slalom	Super-G	Downhill	Combined
2011	25	—	—	15	—	—
2013	27	—	—	11	—	28
2015	29	—	—	14	28	32
2017	31	injured: did not compete				
2019	33	—	—	45	13	—
2021	35	—	—	19	24	—
2023	37	—	—	—	15	—

== Olympic results ==
Year	Age	Slalom	Giant slalom	Super-G	Downhill	Combined
2018	32	—	—	20	—	—
2022	36	—	—	18	15	—

== National titles ==
Marsaglia has won eight national titles.

- Italian Alpine Ski Championships
  - Downhill: 2011, 2015, 2019 (3)
  - Super-G: 2012, 2014, 2018, 2019 (4)
  - Combined: 2018 (1)
