= Anna Trocker =

Italian alpine skier (born 2008)

Personal information
- Born: 23 December 2008 (age 17) Völs am Schlern, South Tyrol, Italy

Skiing career
- Country: Italy
- Sport: Alpine skiing
- Club: Seiser Alm Ski Team
- Disciplines: Slalom, Giant slalom
- World Cup debut: 27 December 2025 (age 17)

Olympics
- Teams: 1 – (2026)
- Medals: 0

World Championships
- Teams: 0

World Cup
- Seasons: 1 – (2026)
- Podiums: 0
- Overall titles: 0 – (77th in 2026)
- Discipline titles: 0 – (38th in SL and GS, 2026)
Medal record
Women's alpine skiing
Representing Italy
Junior World Championships
Gold medal – first place	2026 Narvik	Slalom
Gold medal – first place	2026 Narvik	Giant slalom
Silver medal – second place	2026 Narvik	Team combined

Anna Trocker (born 23 December 2008) is an Italian alpine ski racer who primarily competes in the technical events, slalom and giant slalom. She represents Italy internationally and has competed in the FIS Alpine Ski World Cup and the 2026 Winter Olympics. Trocker is also a double junior world champion, having won both the giant slalom and slalom at the 2026 Junior World Championships in Narvik.

== Early life ==
Trocker was born in Fiè allo Sciliar (Völs am Schlern), in South Tyrol, Italy. She began skiing at the age of three and developed through the local ski club system before joining the Seiser Alm Ski Team, where she continues to compete.

== Career ==
=== Early career ===
Trocker began competing in International Ski and Snowboard Federation (FIS) races in December 2024. During the 2024–25 season she achieved early success in junior and FIS competitions, including podium finishes and a victory in a slalom race in Folgaria in March 2025.

=== Nor-Am Cup ===
In December 2025 Trocker recorded her first major continental-level results in the Nor-Am Cup at Copper Mountain, United States. She finished second in the giant slalom on 10 December and won the slalom the following day. She later secured another Nor-Am Cup victory in giant slalom at Mont Tremblant in January 2026.

=== World Cup ===
Trocker made her World Cup debut on 27 December 2025 in the giant slalom at Semmering, Austria. She did not qualify for the second run. Since Trocker won gold medals in the slalom and giant slalom events at the 2026 Alpine World Junior Championships in Narvik, she was eligible to compete at the World Cup finals 2026 in those disciplines. Trocker ended up scoring her first World Cup points by finishing in ninth position in the slalom at the finals; she did the same in the giant slalom event, where she finished eighth.

=== 2026 Winter Olympics ===
Trocker represented Italy at the 2026 Winter Olympics in Milan–Cortina where she was among the youngest members of the Italian alpine skiing team. She competed in the women's team combined event alongside Nicol Delago, finishing 10th and posting a slalom time faster than American skier Mikaela Shiffrin. She also raced in the individual slalom, but was unable to complete her first run.

=== Junior World Championships ===
At the 2026 Junior World Championships in Narvik, Norway, Trocker became a double Junior World Champion by winning the gold in both the giant slalom and slalom events. She became the first Italian woman to win two events at a single championships. She also earned a silver medal in the team combined with Ludovica Righi.

== Personal life ==
Aside from skiing, Trocker has previously practiced tennis. In her spare time she also enjoys hiking, music, and films.

== World Cup results ==
=== Season standings ===
Season
Season	Age	Overall	Slalom	Giant slalom	Super-G	Downhill
2026	17	77	38	38	—	—

=== Top-ten finishes ===
- 0 podiums; 2 top tens

Season
Season	Date	Location	Discipline	Place
2026	24 March 2026	Hafjell, Norway	Slalom	9th
2026	25 March 2026	Hafjell, Norway	Giant slalom	8th

== Olympic results ==
Year
Year	Age	Slalom	Giant slalom	Super-G	Downhill	Team combined
2026	17	DNF1	—	—	—	10
