= Jolanda Plank =

Italian alpine skier (born 1958)

Jolanda Plank (born 14 June 1958 in Sterzing) is an Italian retired alpine skier who competed in the 1976 Winter Olympics.
