= Barbara Merlin =

Italian alpine skier

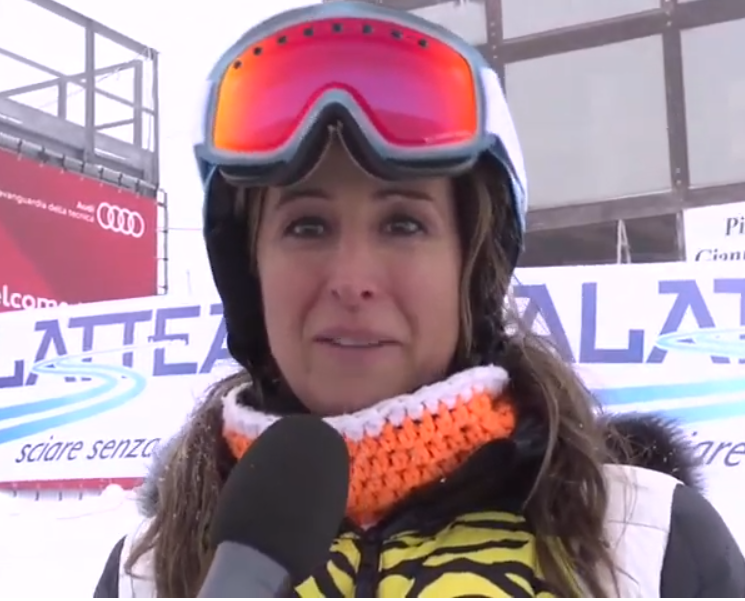
- Merlin in 2016

Personal information
- Born: 12 January 1972 (age 54) Turin, Italy
- Height: 1.65 m (5 ft 5 in)

Skiing career
- Sport: Alpine skiing
- Club: Fiamme Oro
- Retired: 2000
- Disciplines: Speed events
- World Cup debut: 1991

Olympics
- Teams: 3

World Championships
- Teams: 3

World Cup
- Seasons: 10
- Podiums: 2

Barbara Merlin (born 12 January 1972) is an Italian former alpine skier.

== Career ==
During her career she has achieved 8 results among the top 5 in the World Cup. She competed in the 1992 Winter Olympics, the 1994 Winter Olympics, and the 1998 Winter Olympics.

== World Cup results ==
Top 5

Date	Place	Discipline	Rank
20-01-1996	(Italy) Cortina d'Ampezzo	Downhill	5
19-01-1996	(Italy) Cortina d'Ampezzo	Downhill	4
15-03-1995	(Italy) Bormio	Downhill	3
22-01-1995	(Italy) Cortina d'Ampezzo	Downhill	2
09-12-1994	(Canada) Lake Louise	Downhill	4
03-12-1994	(United States) Vail	Super G	4
29-01-1994	(Germany) Garmisch-Partenkirchen	Downhill	4
08-12-1991	(Italy) Santa Caterina	Giant Slalo	4

== National titles ==
Merlin has won four national championships at individual senior level.

- Italian Alpine Ski Championships
  - Dopwnhill: 1992 (1)
  - Super-G: 1994 (1)
  - Combined: 1992, 1993 (2)
