= Morena Gallizio =

Italian alpine skier

Personal information
- Born: 18 January 1974 (age 52) Bolzano, Italy

Skiing career
- Sport: Alpine skiing
- Club: C.S. Forestale
- Retired: 2000
- Disciplines: Technical events
- World Cup debut: 1991

Olympics
- Teams: 3

World Championships
- Teams: 2

World Cup
- Seasons: 10
- Podiums: 4
Medal record
Women's alpine skiing
Representing Italy
World Cup race podiums
| Event | 1st | 2nd | 3rd |
|---|---|---|---|
| Slalom | 0 | 1 | 1 |
| Combined | 0 | 1 | 0 |
| Total | 0 | 2 | 1 |
International competitions
| Event | 1st | 2nd | 3rd |
|---|---|---|---|
| World Junior Championships | 2 | 3 | 0 |
World Junior Championships
| Gold medal – first place | 1993 Monte Campione | Slalom |
| Gold medal – first place | 1993 Monte Campione | Combined |
| Silver medal – second place | 1991 Geilo | Slalom |
| Silver medal – second place | 1992 Maribor | Super-G |
| Silver medal – second place | 1993 Monte Campione | Giant slalom |

Morena Gallizio married Tescari (born 18 January 1974) is an Italian former alpine skier.

She is married to former alpine skier Fabrizio Tescari.

== Career ==
She competed in the 1992 Winter Olympics, 1994 Winter Olympics, and 1998 Winter Olympics.

== National titles ==
Gallizio-Tescari has won three national championships at individual senior level.

- Italian Alpine Ski Championships
  - Slalom: 1995
  - Combined: 1995, 1997
