= Ermanno Nogler =

Italian alpine skier and coach (1921–2000)

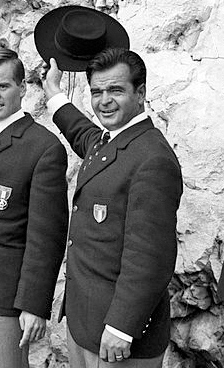
- Ermanno Nogler in 1966

Personal information
- Born: 4 November 1921 Castelrotto, Italy
- Died: 23 June 2000 (aged 78) Bressanone, Italy

Sport
- Sport: Alpine skiing

Ermanno Nogler (4 November 1921 – 23 June 2000) was an Italian alpine skier and coach. He finished 42nd in the slalom at the 1952 Winter Olympics in Oslo. After retiring from skiing he coached the national Italian team. His trainees included slalom world champion Carlo Senoner. Around 1968, while working in Sweden, Nogler "discovered" the talented young Swedish skier Ingemar Stenmark, and eventually served as coach for Stenmark during his entire career.
