= Verena Stuffer =

Italian alpine skier

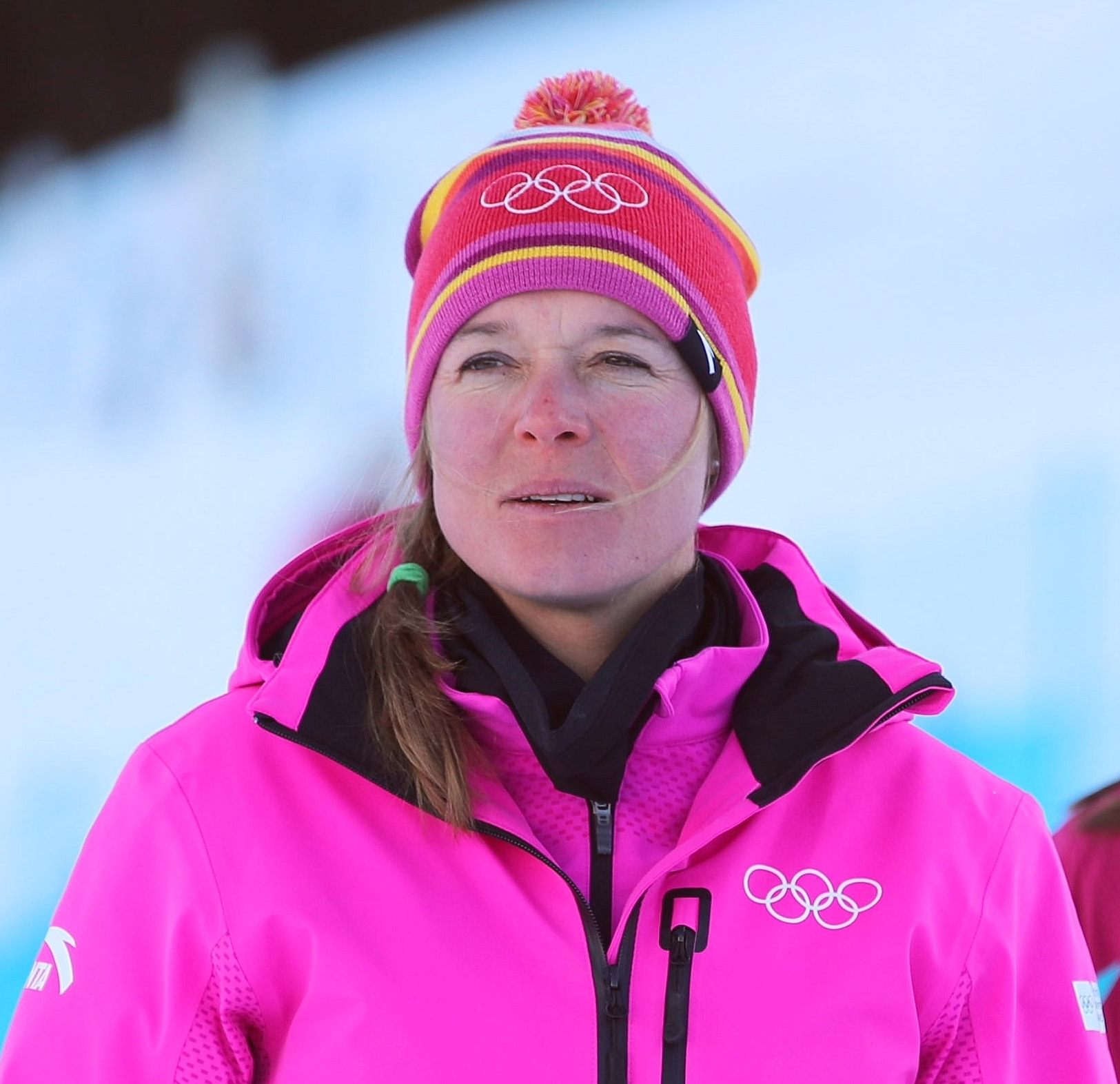
- Stuffer at the 2020 Youth Olympics

Personal information
- Born: 23 June 1984 (age 42) Bolzano, Italy
- Height: 1.68 m (5 ft 6 in)
- Weight: 65 kg (143 lb)

Sport
- Country: Italy
- Sport: Alpine skiing

Verena Stuffer (born 23 June 1984) is a South Tyrolean former alpine skier from Italy.

== Career ==
She competed for Italy at the 2014 Winter Olympics in the alpine skiing events. She also made a total of 148 FIS Alpine Ski World Cup starts and competed at the 2009, 2011 and 2017 World Championships. She retired at the end of the 2017-18 season, making her final World Cup start in a super-G at Crans-Montana in March 2018.
