= Nives Dei Rossi =

Italian alpine skier (1909–2006)

Personal information
- Nationality: Italian
- Born: 8 October 1909
- Died: 1 August 2006 (aged 96)

Sport
- Sport: Alpine skiing

Nives Dei Rossi (18 October 1909 – 1 August 2006) was an Italian alpine skier. She competed in the women's combined event at the 1936 Winter Olympics.
