= Sëlva =

- Comune
- Chemun de Sëlva; Comune di Selva di Val Gardena; Gemeinde Wolkenstein in Gröden
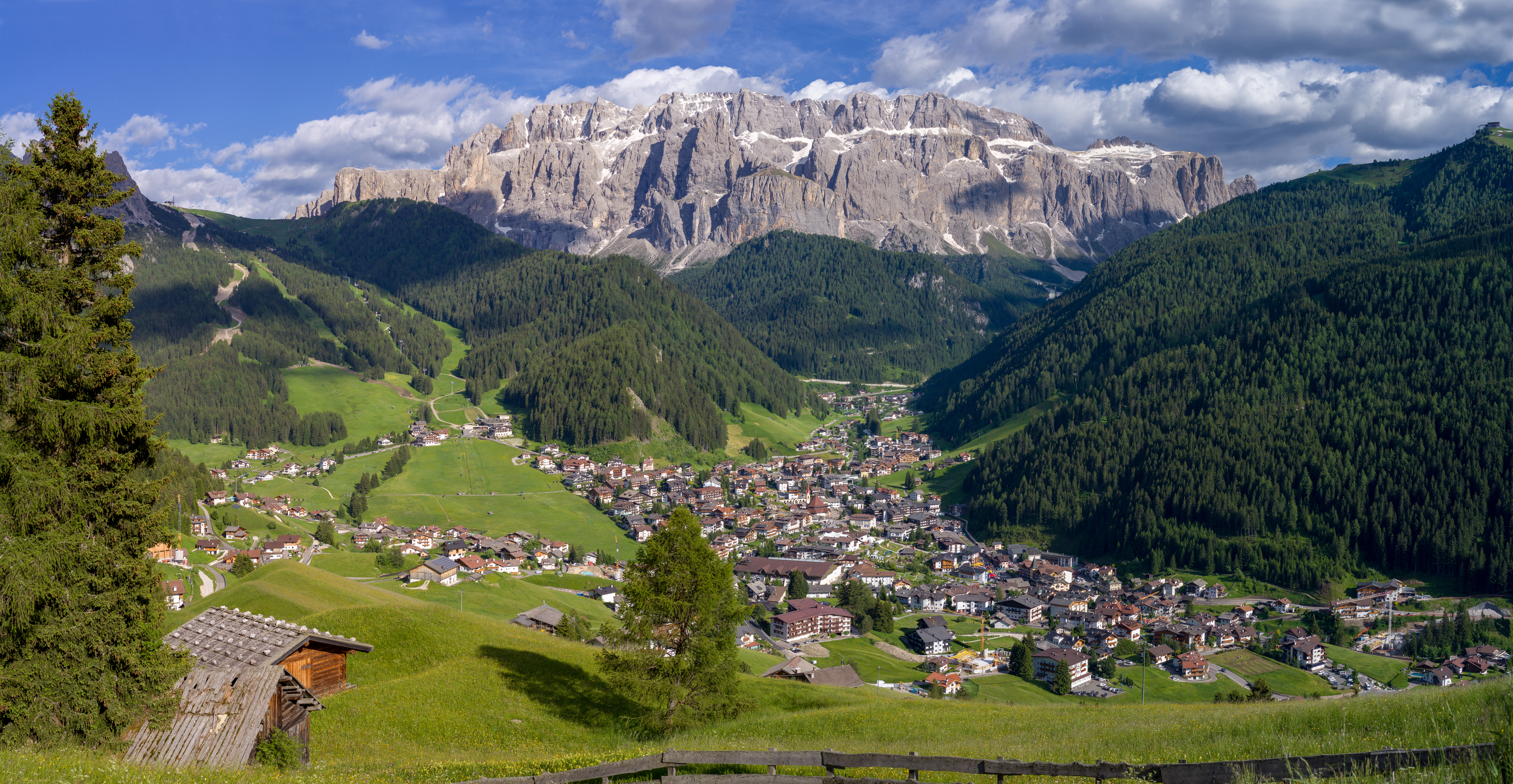
- View of Sëlva

- Location within Italy Location within Trentino-Alto Adige/Südtirol
- Coordinates: 46°33′N 11°46′E
- Country: Italy
- Region: Trentino-Alto Adige/Südtirol
- Province: South Tyrol (BZ)
- Frazioni: Plan

Government
  - Mayor: Tobias Nocker (SVP)

Area
  - Total: 53.2 km^{2} (20.5 sq mi)
- Elevation: 1,563 m (5,128 ft)

Population (Nov. 2010)
  - Total: 2,637
  - Density: 49.6/km^{2} (128/sq mi)
- Demonym(s): Ladin: salvans Italian: gardenesi German: Wolkensteiner
- Time zone: UTC+1 (CET)
  - Summer (DST): UTC+2 (CEST)
- Postal code: 39048
- Dialing code: 0471
- Website: Official website

Sëlva (Ladin: [ˈsɜlva]; Italian: Selva di Val Gardena [ˈselva di ˌval ɡarˈdeːna, - ɡarˈdɛːna]; German: Wolkenstein in Gröden [ˈvɔlkn̩ʃtaɪn ɪn ˈɡrøːdn̩]) is a comune (municipality) and a village in the Val Gardena in South Tyrol, northern Italy, located about 30 kilometres (19 mi) east of the city of Bolzano. The Ladin and Italian place names derive from the Latin word silva ("wood").

== History ==
=== Coat-of-arms ===
The arms are quarterly, the first and third quarters are per bend nebuly argent and gules; the second and third quarters are indented azure and Argent on a Base sable. The emblem represents the insignia of the Lords of Wolkenstein who built the local castle in 1291. The arms were adopted in 1968.

== Geography ==
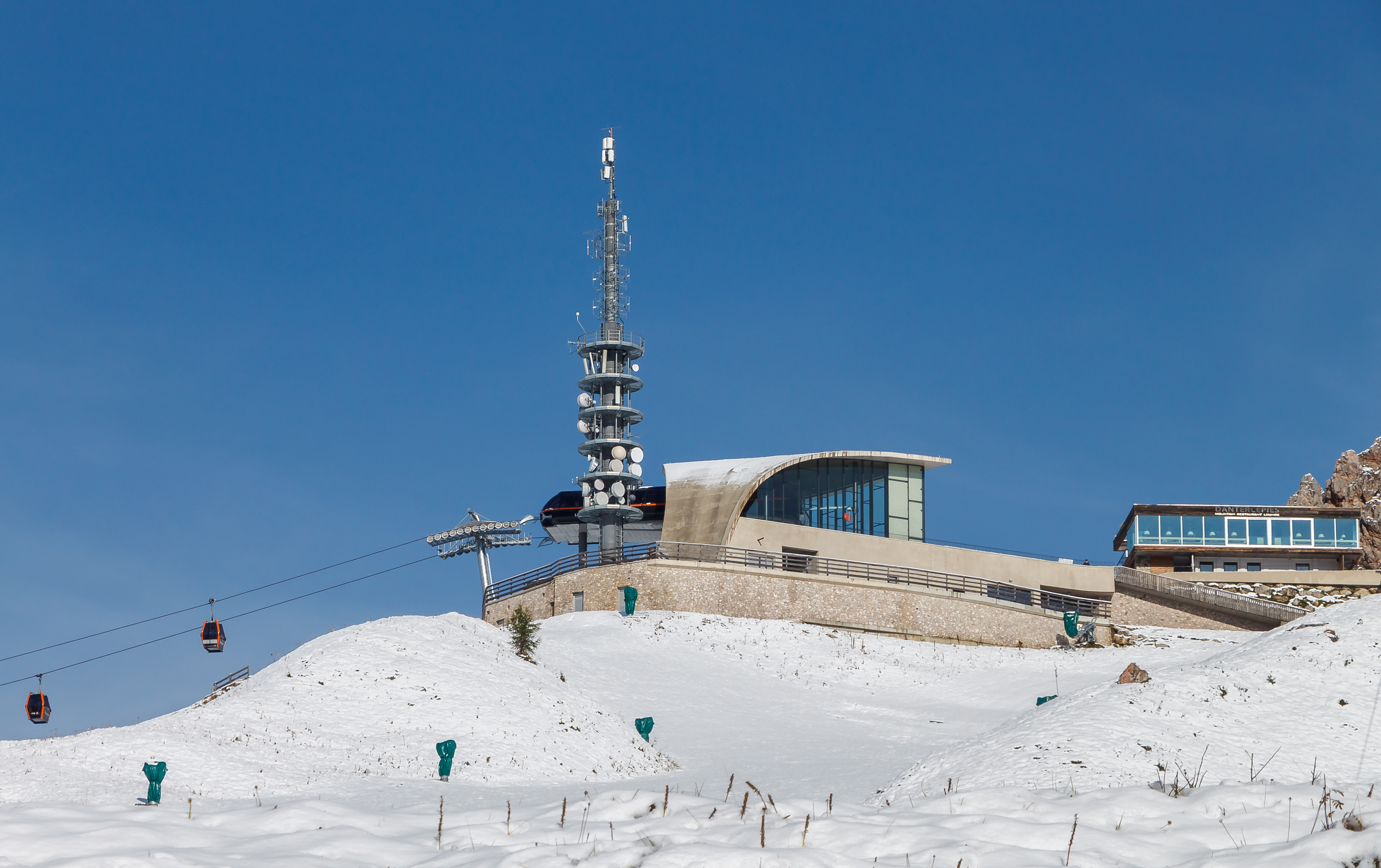
Upper terminus of the Dantercëpies aerial cableway in summer after an early snowfall.

As of 30 December 2010, it had a population of 2,637 and an area of 53.2 square kilometres (20.5 mi^{2}). Sëlva borders the following municipalities: Badia, Campitello di Fassa, Canazei, Corvara, San Martin de Tor, and Santa Cristina Gherdëina.

It is perhaps best known as one of the starting points of the Sella Ronda ski tour.

== Society ==
=== Linguistic distribution ===
According to the 2011 census, 89.74% of the population speak Ladin, 5.15% Italian and 5.11% German as first language.

=== Demographic evolution ===
Historical population

Year	Pop.	±%
1921	999	—
1931	999	+0.0%
1936	1,102	+10.3%
1951	1,282	+16.3%

Year	Pop.	±%
1961	1,604	+25.1%
1971	2,137	+33.2%
1981	2,294	+7.3%
1991	2,394	+4.4%

Year	Pop.	±%
2001	2,513	+5.0%
2011	2,660	+5.8%
2021	2,592	−2.6%

Source: Data from ISTAT

== Climate ==
Sëlva is characterized by a typical Alpine climate. Summers are rather short and relatively wet. The average daily temperatures in summer lie between 18 and 21 °C, while at night temperatures usually drop to between 6 and 9 °C. Winters are typically cold, long and relatively dry. The average daily temperatures in winter lie between 0 and 2 °C, while at night temperatures usually drop to between -6 and -9 °C. The wettest month is August with 142 mm, while the driest is February with only 21 mm. This data was measured at the weather station in Plan at an altitude of 1,594 metres between 1991 and 2020.

Climate data for Sëlva (1991–2020) (location of station: Plan; altitude: 1,594 m)
Month	Jan	Feb	Mar	Apr	May	Jun	Jul	Aug	Sep	Oct	Nov	Dec	Year
Record high °C (°F)	11 (52)	15 (59)	17 (63)	20 (68)	25 (77)	30 (86)	29 (84)	30 (86)	26 (79)	20 (68)	17 (63)	11 (52)	30 (86)
Mean daily maximum °C (°F)	0.3 (32.5)	1.8 (35.2)	5.3 (41.5)	8.9 (48.0)	13.7 (56.7)	17.9 (64.2)	20.2 (68.4)	19.3 (66.7)	14.6 (58.3)	9.4 (48.9)	4.0 (39.2)	0.0 (32.0)	9.6 (49.3)
Daily mean °C (°F)	−3.8 (25.2)	−2.9 (26.8)	0.3 (32.5)	3.9 (39.0)	8.2 (46.8)	12.2 (54.0)	14.2 (57.6)	13.8 (56.8)	9.6 (49.3)	5.2 (41.4)	0.5 (32.9)	−3.3 (26.1)	4.8 (40.6)
Mean daily minimum °C (°F)	−7.6 (18.3)	−8.1 (17.4)	−4.8 (23.4)	−1.3 (29.7)	2.8 (37.0)	6.3 (43.3)	8.2 (46.8)	8.1 (46.6)	4.6 (40.3)	0.9 (33.6)	−3.0 (26.6)	−6.5 (20.3)	−0.1 (31.8)
Record low °C (°F)	−19 (−2)	−21 (−6)	−21 (−6)	−16 (3)	−7 (19)	−3 (27)	0 (32)	−2 (28)	−6 (21)	−12 (10)	−15 (5)	−21 (−6)	−21 (−6)
Average precipitation mm (inches)	24.0 (0.94)	20.5 (0.81)	38.2 (1.50)	55.4 (2.18)	96.4 (3.80)	136.1 (5.36)	131.8 (5.19)	142.1 (5.59)	88.0 (3.46)	94.7 (3.73)	76.3 (3.00)	41.9 (1.65)	945.4 (37.22)
Average precipitation days (≥ 1.0 mm)	4.7	4.7	5.8	8.6	12.1	14.2	12.7	12.0	9.0	8.6	8.3	5.8	106.5
Source: Landeswetterdienst Südtirol

== Gallery ==
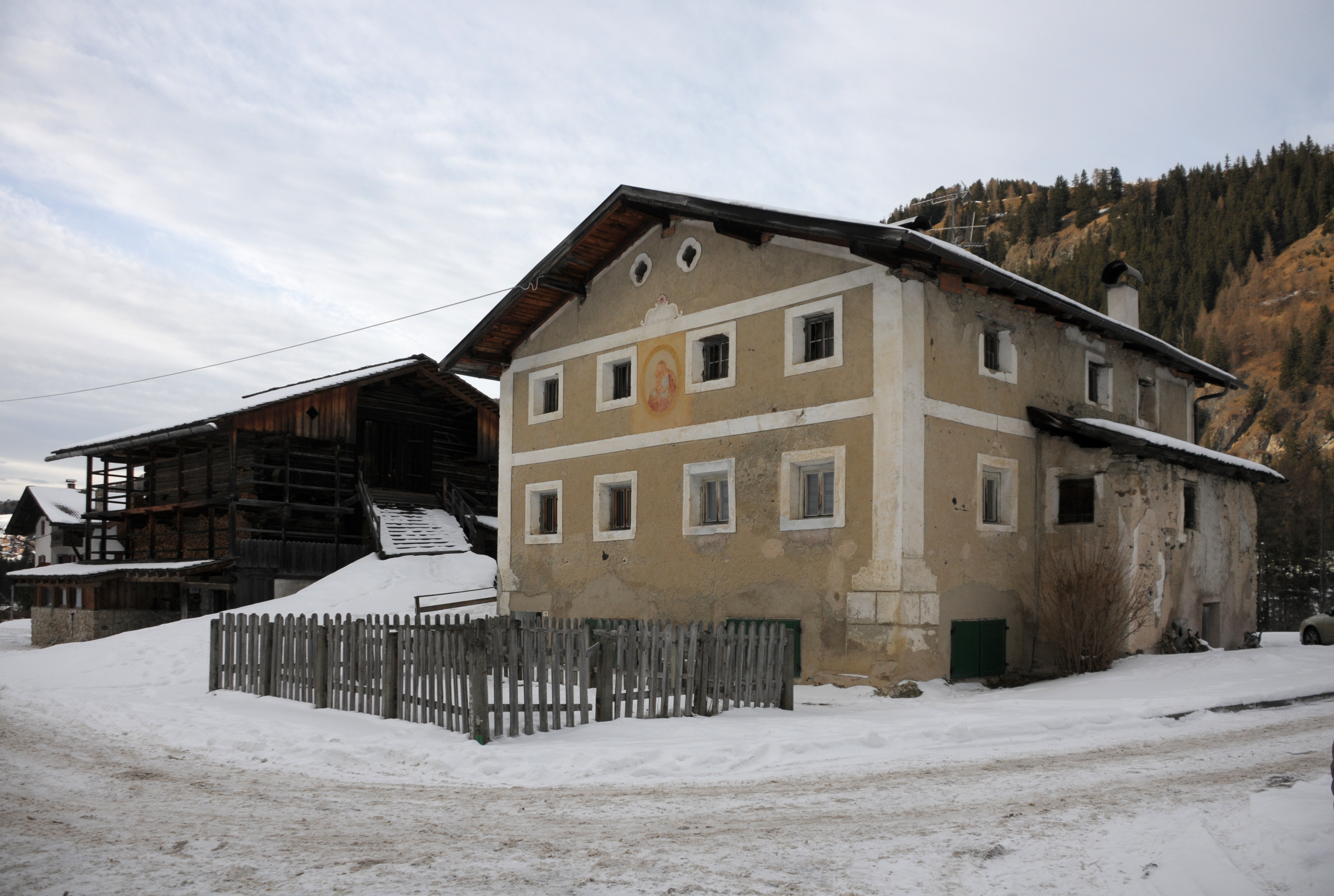
The farmhouse Piciulëi in Sëlva Gherdëina. Southern aspect.

== Notable people ==
- Ferdinando Glück (1901–1987) cross-country skier, competed in the men's 50 kilometre event at the 1928 Winter Olympics
- Hans Nogler (1919–2011 in Sëlva) alpine skier, competed in the 1948 Winter Olympics
- Carlo Senoner (born 1943) retired alpine skier, competed in slalom events at the 1960 and 1968 Winter Olympics
- Adolf Insam (born 1951) ice hockey player, competed in the men's tournament at the 1984 Winter Olympics
- Werner Perathoner (born 1967) former Alpine skier, specialized in downhill and super-G, competed at the 1994 and 1998 Winter Olympics
- Peter Runggaldier (born 1968) former Alpine skier, who specialized in downhill and super-G disciplines, competed at the 1994 and 1998 Winter Olympics, lives in Sëlva
- Karl Unterkircher (1970–2008) mountaineer, opened new mountain routes.
