= Thomas Bergamelli =

Italian alpine skier (born 1973)

Thomas Bergamelli (born 1973) is a retired Italian alpine skier.

== Career ==
He competed in three events at the 1992 Junior World Championships, managing a fourth place in the giant slalom. In the World Cup he would compete in the slalom and giant slalom exclusively.

He made his World Cup debut in December 1994 in Lech, later collecting his first World Cup points with a 20th place in the giant slalom at Tignes in November 1995. Managing once to equal his personal best World Cup placement of 20th, in January 1998 in Saalbach-Hinterglemm, he was a prolific competitor until his last World Cup race in January 2000 in Chamonix.

== The four Bergamelli ski brothers ==
The Bergamellis were four brothers, Sergio (born 1970), Norman (born 1971), Thomas (born 1973) and Giancarlo (born 1974), and all four were World Cup alpine skiers.
