= Lucia Mazzotti =

Italian alpine skier (born 1985)

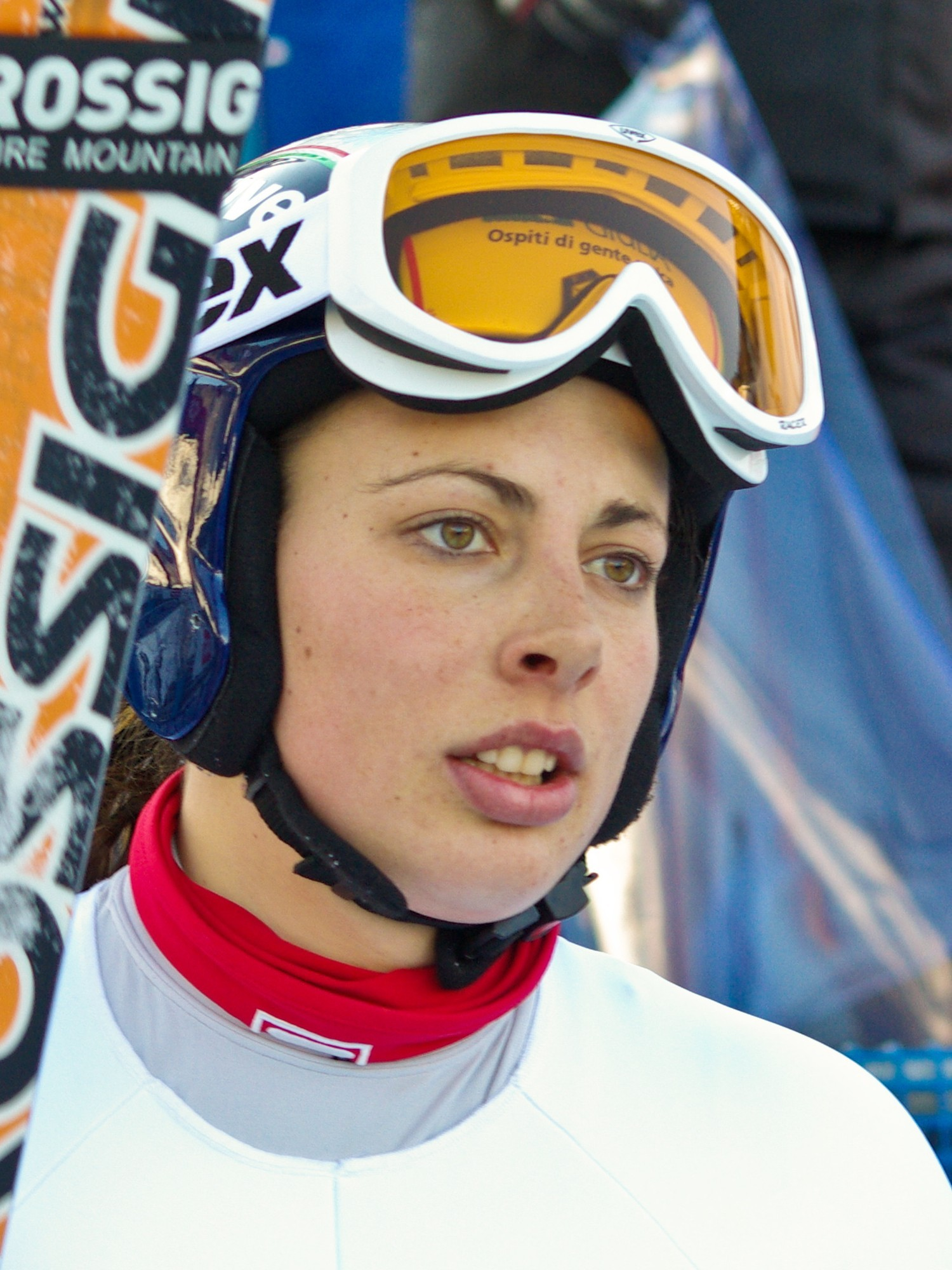

Lucia Mazzotti (born 1985) is an Italian alpine skier.

She won the silver medal in the giant slalom at the 2011 Winter Universiade.

She made her World Cup debut in December 2006 in Lake Louise, also collecting her first World Cup points with a 29th place. Her career best was a 24th place, achieved in a December 2009 Val d'Isere super-G and a March 2011 Tarvisio super combined.
