= Vera Schenone =

Italian alpine skier (born 1940)

Personal information
- Nationality: Italian
- Born: 25 April 1940 (age 84); Sestriere, Italy

Sport
- Sport: Alpine skiing

Vera Schenone (born 25 April 1940) is an Italian former alpine skier. She competed in three events at the 1956 Winter Olympics.

Schenone was arrested on January 3, 2025, after shooting and critically injuring her neighbour in Moncalieri after an argument.
