= Florian Eisath =

Italian alpine skier

Personal information
- Born: 27 November 1984 (age 41) Bolzano, South Tyrol, Italy
- Height: 1.77 m (5 ft 10 in)

Skiing career
- Sport: Alpine skiing
- Club: G.S. Fiamme Gialle
- Disciplines: Giant slalom
- World Cup debut: 19 December 2004 (age 20)

Olympics
- Teams: 0

World Championships
- Teams: 1 – (2015)
- Medals: 0

World Cup
- Wins: 0
- Podiums: 1 – (1 GS)
- Overall titles: 0 – (35th in 2017)
- Discipline titles: 0 – (9th in GS, 2016 & 2017)

Florian Eisath (born 27 November 1984) is an Italian alpine ski racer.

Born in Bolzano, South Tyrol, he competed at the 2015 World Championships in Beaver Creek, USA, where he placed eighth in the giant slalom.

== World Cup results ==
=== Season standings ===
Season	Age	Overall	Slalom	Giant slalom	Super-G	Downhill	Combined
2006	21	137	—	51	—	—	—
2007	22	107	—	43	44	—	34
2008	23	80	—	51	—	—	18
2009	24						
2010	25	112	—	33	—	—	—
2011	26	122	—	37	—	—	—
2012	27	102	—	33	—	—	—
2013	28	67	—	22	—	—	—
2014	29	102	—	33	—	—	—
2015	30	55	—	14	—	—	—
2016	31	44	—	9	—	—	—
2017	32	35	—	9	—	—	—
2018	33	57	—	15	—	—	—

- Standings through 16 March 2018

=== Race podiums ===
- 1 podium – (1 GS)

Season	Date	Location	Discipline	Place
2017	18 Dec 2016	Alta Badia, Italy	Giant slalom	3rd

== World Championships results ==
Year	Age	Slalom	Giant slalom	Super-G	Downhill	Combined
2015	30	—	8	—	—	—
2017	32	—	17	—	—	—

== Olympic results ==
Year	Age	Slalom	Giant slalom	Super-G	Downhill	Combined
2018	33	–	14	—	—	—
