= Albino Alverà =

Italian alpine skier (1923–2004)

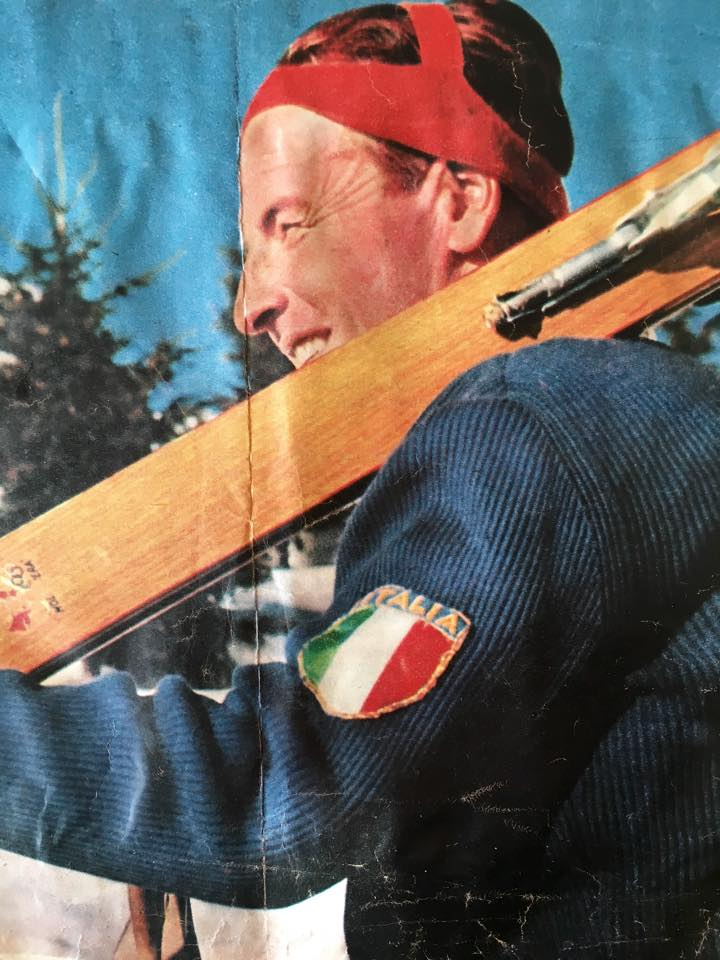
- Albino Alverà in 1949

Personal information
- Nationality: Italian
- Born: 1 March 1923; Cortina d'Ampezzo, Italy
- Died: 26 October 2004 (aged 81); Cortina d'Ampezzo, Italy

Sport
- Sport: Alpine skiing

Albino Alverà (1 March 1923 – 26 October 2004) was an Italian alpine skier. He competed in the men's slalom at the 1952 Winter Olympics.
