= Elena Matous =

Italian alpine skier

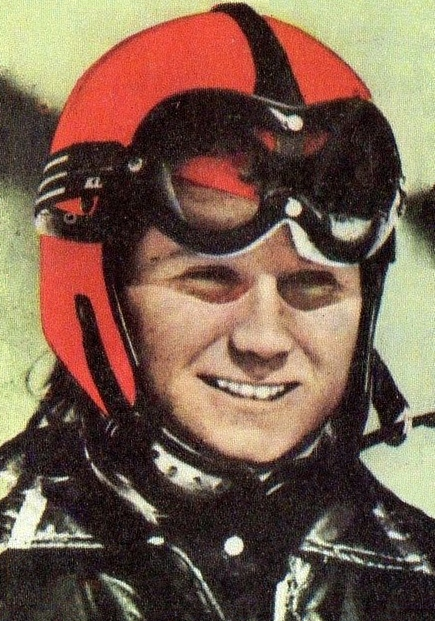

Personal information
- Born: 10 May 1953 (age 73) Cortina d'Ampezzo, Italy

Sport
- Sport: Alpine skiing

Elena Matous (born 10 May 1953) is an Italian retired alpine skier, who competed for Italy, San Marino, Iran and Luxembourg. She had one second place in the downhill event at the 1977 Alpine Skiing World Cup and finished eighth overall.

== Europa Cup results ==
Matous has won an overall Europa Cup and one specialty standings.

- FIS Alpine Ski Europa Cup
  - Overall: 1974
  - Slalom: 1974
