= Karl Unterkircher =

Italian mountaineer (1970-2008)

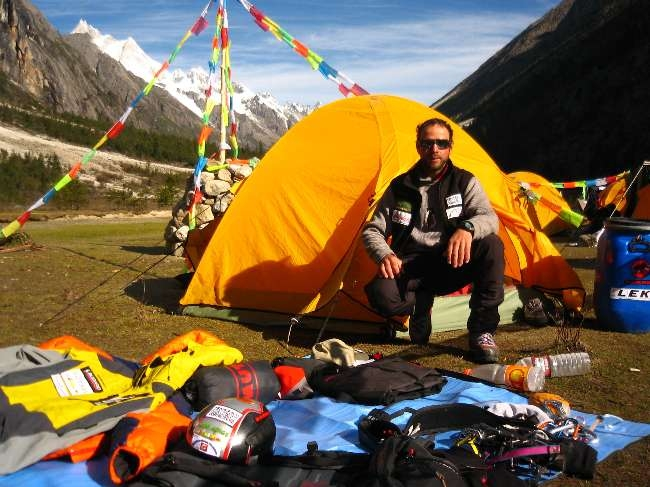
- Unterkircher in July 2007
- Born: 27 August 1970; Sëlva, Italy
- Died: 15 July 2008 (aged 37); Nanga Parbat
- Occupation: Mountaineer
- Website: karlunterkircher.it

Karl Unterkircher (27 August 1970 – 15 July 2008) was an Italian mountaineer. He is mostly known for opening new mountain routes.

Unterkircher was born in Sëlva. In 2004, he was the first alpinist to climb the two highest peaks on Earth (Mount Everest and K2) without oxygen in the same year (within 63 days) he made the second ascent of Mount Genyen, China, (first ascent by Japanese in 1987) and the first ascent of the North face of Gasherbrum II (together with Daniele Bernasconi and Michele Compagnoni). He also climbed the Jasemba, Nepal, (together with Hans Kammerlander). He received several awards including the Cavaliere Ordine al Merito della Repubblica Italiana.

On 15 July 2008 he fell into a crevasse while descending from the summit of Nanga Parbat and is presumed dead. "Karl Unterkircher was the new star of mountain climbing", commented Reinhold Messner when told of his death.

== Karl Unterkircher Award ==
This award was conferred for the first time in July 2010 in Sëlva to the Swiss rock climber Ueli Steck. The second edition took place on 6 July 2012. The winners of this award were Marina Kopteva, Galina Chibitok and Anna Yasinskaya (Ukraine) for their new opening of the northwest wall route Great Trango Tower (Pakistan). The 3rd edition prize was given on July 23, 2014 to the brothers Auer Hansjörg and Matthias (A) and their climbing friend Simon Anthamatten (CH) for the first ascent of the east face of Kunyuang Chhish (Karakorum / Pakistan) on July 18, 2013. On 14 July 2018 Italian Simone Moro, Spaniard Alex Txikon and Pakistani Muhammad Ali were awarded the 5th Karl Unterkircher for the first winter ascent of Nanga Parbat (8126m) on 26 February 2016. The Jury of the 5th edition of the Karl Unterkircher Award, composed by Silvio Mondinelli "Gnaro" (President), Thomas Huber, Carlo Caccia, Simon Kehrer and Hubert Moroder, announced the name of the winners at the Culture House "Oswald von Wolkenstein" in Selva di Val Gardena.
