= Riccardo Foppa =

Italian alpine skier (born 1961)

Personal information
- Born: 13 April 1961 (age 65) Livinallongo del Col di Lana, Italy

Skiing career
- Sport: Alpine skiing
- Retired: 1984
- Disciplines: Technical events
- World Cup debut: 1981

World Championships
- Teams: 1
- Medals: 0

World Cup
- Seasons: 4
- Podiums: 0

Riccardo Foppa (born 13 April 1961) is a former Italian World Cup alpine ski racer.

== World Championships results ==
Year
Year	Age	Slalom	Giant; Slalom	Downhill	Combined
1982	20	-	22	-	-

== National titles ==
Foppa has won a national title.

- Italian Alpine Ski Championships
  - Giant slalom: 1981
