= Clotilde Fasolis =

Italian alpine skier (born 1951)

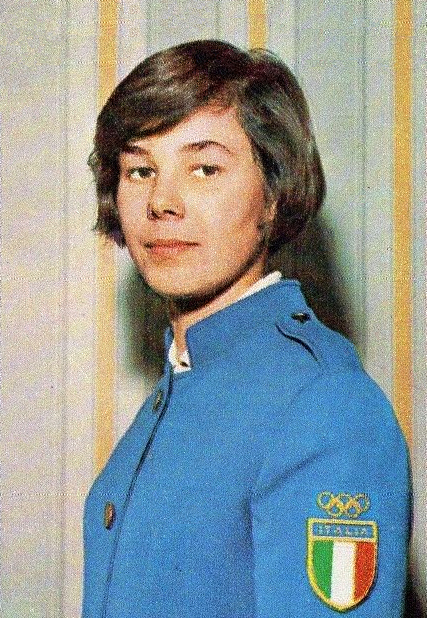
- Clotilde Fasolis c. 1969

Personal information
- Born: 22 July 1951 (age 75) Sommariva, Italy
- Height: 1.68 m (5 ft 6 in)
- Weight: 58 kg (128 lb)

Sport
- Sport: Alpine skiing

Clotilde Fasolis (born 22 July 1951) is an Italian former alpine skier. She competed at the 1968 Winter Olympics in the downhill, slalom and giant slalom events with the best results of 22nd place in the slalom. She was the flag bearer for Italy at the 1968 Winter Olympics.

Summer Olympics
Preceded by Eugenio Monti	Flag bearer for Italy; 1968 Grenoble	Succeeded by Luciano De Paolis
