= Giovanni Borsotti =

Italian alpine skier (born 1990)

Personal information
- Born: 18 December 1990 (age 35) Briançon, France
- Height: 1.76 m (5 ft 9 in)

Skiing career
- Sport: Alpine skiing
- Club: Centro Sportivo Carabinieri
- Disciplines: Giant slalom
- World Cup debut: 2009

Olympics
- Teams: 0

World Championships
- Teams: 4

World Cup
- Seasons: 18

Giovanni Borsotti (born 18 December 1990) is an Italian alpine ski racer who competes for Centro Sportivo Carabinieri and represents Italy internationally.

== Career ==
He made his FIS Alpine Ski World Cup debut in 2009.

He competed at the FIS Alpine World Ski Championships 2011 in Garmisch-Partenkirchen, where he placed 28 in giant slalom. He competed at the 2015 World Championships in Beaver Creek, USA, where he placed 24th in the giant slalom. Borsotti has finished in the top 10 five times in World Cup.

== World Cup results ==
Top 10

Date	Place	Discipline	Rank
27-01-2026	(Austria) Schladming	Giant Slalom	9
18-12-2023	(Italy) Alta Badia	Giant Slalom	9
18-03-2022	(France) Courchevel/Meribel	Team Parallel	7
19-03-2021	(Austria) Lenzerheide	Team Parallel	8
12-12-2015	(France) Val d'Isere	Giant Slalom	6
