= Nicole Gius =

Italian alpine skier (born 1980)

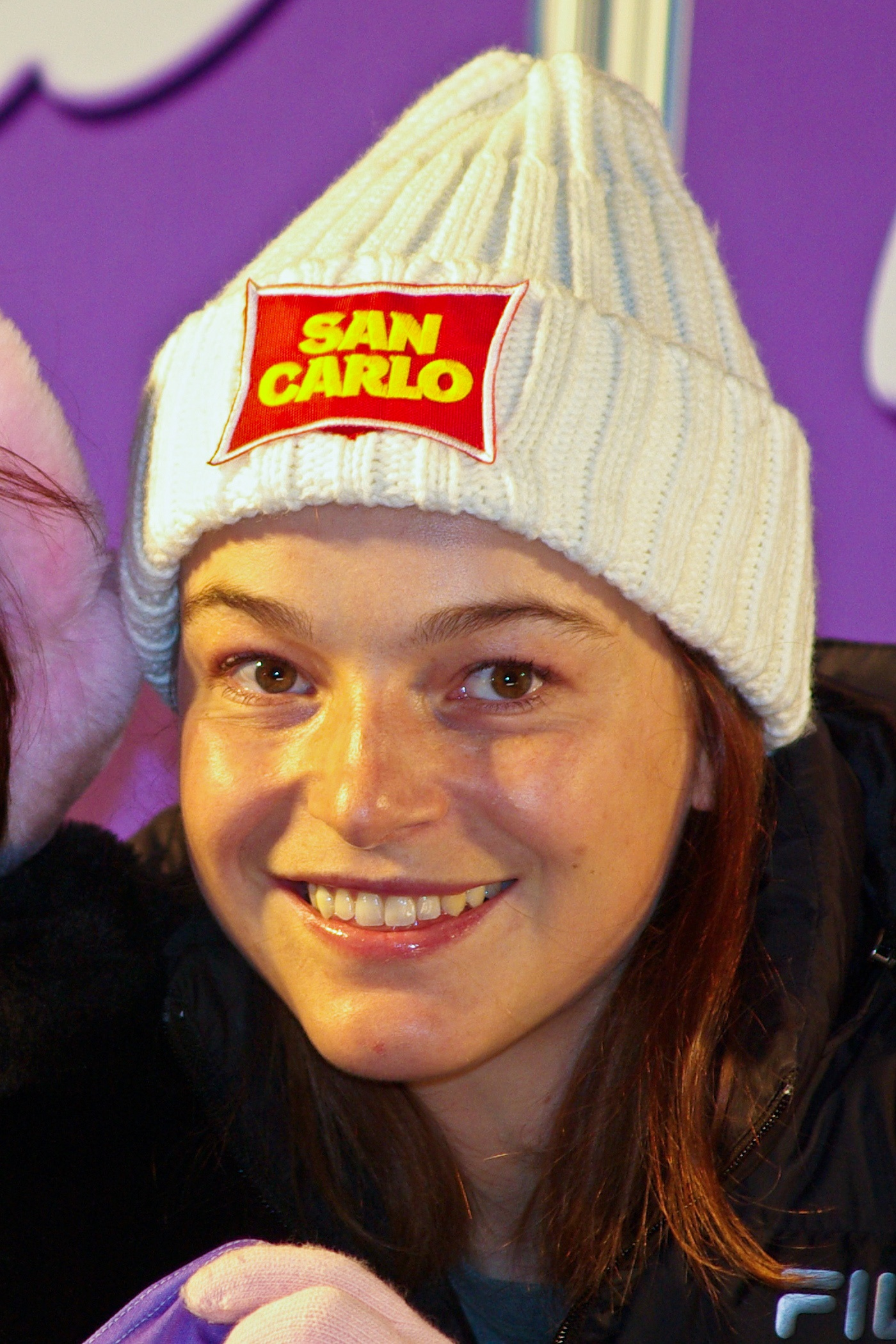
- Nicole Gius, Semmering 2008

Personal information
- Born: 16 November 1980 (age 45) Silandro, Italy
- Height: 1.59 m (5 ft 3 in)

Skiing career
- Sport: Alpine skiing
- Club: C.S. Esercito
- Retired: 2013
- Disciplines: Polyvalent
- World Cup debut: 1996

Olympics
- Teams: 2
- Medals: 0

World Championships
- Teams: 6
- Medals: 0

World Cup
- Seasons: 18
- Podiums: 4

Nicole Gius (born 16 November 1980) is an Italian alpine skier. She was born in Schlanders, Italy. She competed at the 2002 Winter Olympics and the 2010 Winter Olympics.

== Career ==
Nicole Gius has participated in six editions of the World Championships, two of the Winter Olympics. In her career she has achieved four podiums in the World Cup and won seven Italian titles in slalom.

== National titles ==
Gius has won seven national titles.

- Italian Alpine Ski Championships
  - Downhill: 1999, 2003, 2004, 2005, 2007, 2008, 2009 (7)
