= Fabrizio Tescari =

Italian alpine skier

Personal information
- Born: 6 April 1969 (age 57) Asiago, Italy

Skiing career
- Sport: Alpine skiing
- Club: C.S. Forestale
- Retired: 2001
- Disciplines: Technical events
- World Cup debut: 1987

Olympics
- Teams: 2

World Championships
- Teams: 3

World Cup
- Seasons: 15
- Wins: 1
- Podiums: 1
Medal record
Men's alpine skiing
Representing Italy
World Cup race podiums
Event	1st	2nd	3rd
Slalom	1	0	0

Fabrizio Tescari (born 6 April 1969) is an Italian former alpine skier.

He is married to former alpine skier Morena Gallizio.

== Career ==
During his career he has achieved 14 results among the top 10 (1 victory) in the World Cup. He competed in the 1994 Winter Olympics and 1998 Winter Olympics.

== National titles ==
Tescari has won two national championships at individual senior level.

- Italian Alpine Ski Championships
  - Slalom: 1992, 1997
