= Giancarlo Bergamelli =

Italian alpine skier (born 1974)

Giancarlo Bergamelli (born 28 October 1974) is a retired Italian alpine skier who competed in the 2002 Winter Olympics.

== The four Bergamelli ski brothers ==
The Bergamellis were four brothers, Sergio (born 1970), Norman (born 1971), Thomas (born 1973) and Giancarlo (born 1974), and all four were World Cup alpine skiers.
