= Inge Senoner =

Italian alpine skier (1940–2007)

Personal information
- Full name: Inge Anna Senoner
- Nationality: Italian
- Born: 21 February 1940; Santa Cristina Gherdëina, Italy
- Died: 22 July 2007 (aged 67)

Sport
- Sport: Alpine skiing

Inge Senoner (21 February 1940 – 22 July 2007) was an Italian alpine skier. She competed in two events at the 1964 Winter Olympics. She is the sister of the skier Carlo Senoner.
