= Carlo Senoner =

Italian alpine skier

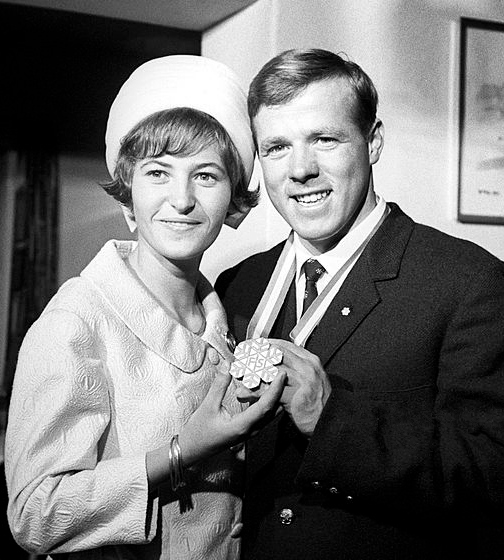
- Carlo Senoner with wife Angelica after the 1966 World Championships

Personal information
- Born: 24 October 1943 (age 82) Selva di Val Gardena, Italy
- Height: 1.73 m (5 ft 8 in)
- Weight: 70 kg (154 lb)

Sport
- Sport: Alpine skiing
- Coached by: Ermanno Nogler
Medal record
Representing Italy
World Championships
Gold medal – first place	1966 Portillo	Slalom

Carlo Senoner (born 24 October 1943) is a retired Italian alpine skier who won the slalom event at the 1966 World Championships. He competed in slalom events at the 1960 and 1968 Winter Olympics, with the best result of 13th place in 1960. His father, Tobia, and sister, Inge, were also Olympic alpine skiers.

== Biography ==
Carlo finished sixth in the slalom and fourth in the Alpine Combined at the 1962 FIS Alpine Skiing World Championships. In the 1966 World Championships, he finished 20th in the downhill race. In the slalom, he was fourth in the first leg, clocking in 53.72 seconds (2.39 seconds behind leading Bengt-Erik Grahn). In the second leg, he was second, clocking in 47.84 seconds but only 0.14 seconds behind Louis Jauffret, the eighth of the first run, and therefore it was enough to win – he was the first starter of the race, and now he was the first after the race. At that time, the procedure for a second leg was different from that of today. Not the 30th (or the 15th) clocked racer started the second leg, but the racer with bib no. 15 (or, if no. 15 was out in the first run, that one who was next). Because Swedish racer Grahn had no. 2, he was the last racer before Mr. Senoner. But Grahn didn't finish; when Carlo started, Guy Périllat was leading; Périllat was the second of the first leg (0.58 seconds ahead of Senoner; in the second leg, Périllat was clocked in 49.11 seconds, place 11), but Senoner could achieve 47.84 seconds, so he won with a margin of 0.69 seconds.
