= Sergio Bergamelli =

Italian alpine skier

Personal information
- Born: 16 August 1970 (age 55) Alzano Lombardo, Italy
- Height: 1.70 m (5 ft 7 in)

Skiing career
- Sport: Alpine skiing
- Retired: 2001
- Disciplines: Technical events
- World Cup debut: 1988

Olympics
- Teams: 2
- Medals: 0

World Championships
- Teams: 1
- Medals: 0

World Cup
- Seasons: 14
- Wins: 1
- Podiums: 1

Sergio Bergamelli (born 16 August 1970) is an Italian former World Cup alpine skier who competed in the 1992 Winter Olympics and 1998 Winter Olympics.

== Career ==
In his career Bergamelli has participated in two Winter Olympics, a world championship. He won a World Cup race in giant (1992) and an Italian title (1995), also in giant.

== The four Bergamelli ski brothers ==
The Bergamellis were four brothers, Sergio (born 1970), Norman (born 1971), Thomas (born 1973) and Giancarlo (born 1974), and all four were World Cup alpine skiers.

== World Cup results ==
Wins

Date	Place	Discipline	Rank
4 January 1992	(Slovenia) Kranjska Gora	Giant slalom	1st
