= Elisabetta Biavaschi =

Italian alpine skier (born 1973)

Elisabetta Biavaschi (born 26 June 1973) is an Italian former alpine skier who competed in the 1998 Winter Olympics.
