= Francesca Marsaglia =

Italian alpine skier

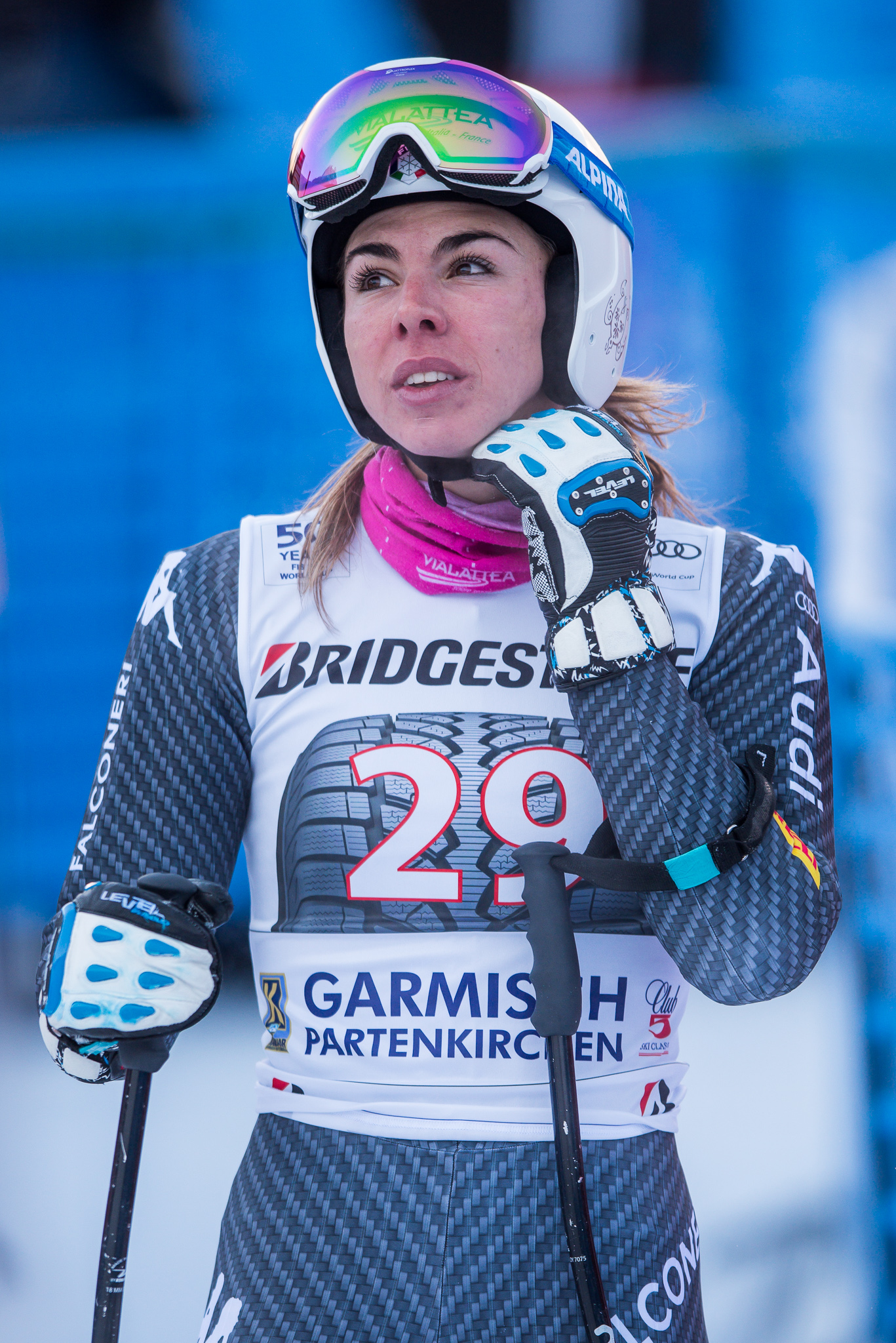
- At Garmisch-Partenkirchen in 2017

Personal information
- Born: 27 January 1990 (age 36) Rome, Italy
- Height: 1.67 m (5 ft 6 in)

Skiing career
- Sport: Alpine skiing
- Club: CS Esercito
- Retired: 5 March 2022 (age 32)
- Disciplines: Downhill, super-G, giant slalom, combined
- World Cup debut: 9 February 2008 (age 18)

Olympics
- Teams: 2 – (2014, 2022)
- Medals: 0

World Championships
- Teams: 5 – (2011, 2015–2021)
- Medals: 0

World Cup
- Seasons: 14 – (2008–2017, 2019–2022)
- Wins: 0
- Podiums: 1 – (1 DH)
- Overall titles: 0 – (25th in 2016)
- Discipline titles: 0 – (10th in SG, 2015)

Francesca Marsaglia (born 27 January 1990) is an Italian former World Cup alpine ski racer. She competed in five World Championships and the 2014 Winter Olympics. Born in Rome, Marsaglia is the sister of fellow alpine racer Matteo Marsaglia.

== World Cup results ==
=== Season standings ===
Season	Age	Overall	Slalom	Giant slalom	Super-G	Downhill	Combined
2011	21	74	—	—	36	34	35
2012	22	66	—	—	33	37	17
2013	23	71	—	—	40	30	16
2014	24	47	—	22	28	40	25
2015	25	31	—	30	10	44	10
2016	26	25	—	23	16	23	10
2017	27	31	—	19	15	42	29
2018	28	Injured: out for season					
2019	29	39	—	33	17	26	—
2020	30	24	—	42	22	12	—
2021	31	32	—	—	9	25	—
2022	32	60	—	—	27	32	—

Standings through 20 March 2022

=== Top five finishes ===
- 0 wins
- 1 podium (1 DH); 26 top tens

Season	Date	Location	Discipline	Place
2020	7 Dez 2019	Lake Louise, Canada	Downhill	3rd
2020	11 Jan 2020	Altenmarkt-Zauchensee, Austria	Downhill	5th
2021	24 Jan 2021	Crans-Montana, Switzerland	Super-G	4th
2021	28 Feb 2021	Val di Fassa, Italy	Super-G	5th

== World Championship results ==
Year	Age	Slalom	Giant slalom	Super-G	Downhill	Combined
2011	21	—	—	—	—	DNF2
2013	23	—	—	—	—	—
2015	25	—	—	18	—	8
2017	27	—	—	17	—	—
2019	29	—	—	7	—	—
2021	31	—	—	23	17	—

== Olympic results ==
Year	Age	Slalom	Giant slalom	Super-G	Downhill	Combined
2014	24	—	16	DNF	—	DNF2
2018	28	Injured: out for season				
2022	32	—	—	22	—	—
