= Lara Magoni =

Italian alpine skier and politician

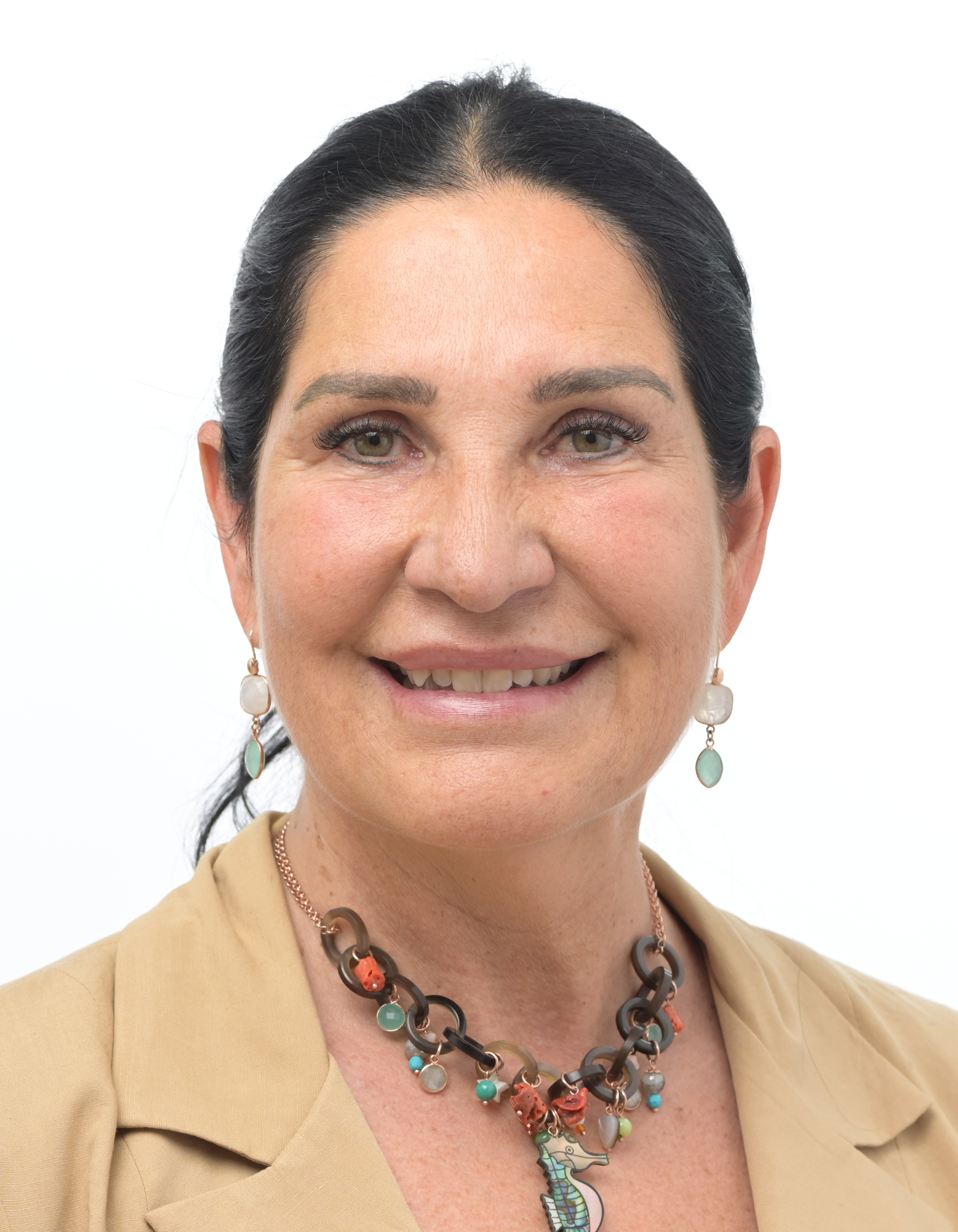

Personal information
- Born: 29 January 1969 (age 57) Selvino, Italy

Skiing career
- Sport: Alpine skiing
- Retired: 2000
- Disciplines: Technical events
- World Cup debut: 1986

Olympics
- Teams: 3
- Medals: 0

World Championships
- Teams: 3
- Medals: 1

World Cup
- Seasons: 15
- Wins: 1
- Podiums: 4
Medal record
World Championships
Silver medal – second place	1997 Sestriere	Slalom

Lara Magoni (born 29 January 1969) is a retired Italian alpine skier and politician. She competed at the 1992, 1994 and the 1998 Winter Olympics.

She is only homonymous, but she is not related to the other Italian skier Paoletta Magoni.

== Career ==
She was the silver medal winner at the 1997 Alpine World Ski Championships.

== World Cup victories ==
Date	Location	Race
16 March 1997	(United States) Vail	Slalom
