= Hans Nogler =

Austrian alpine skier (1919–2011)

Hans Nogler (28 February 1919, in Vienna, Austria – 30 May 2011, in Sëlva, Italy) was an Austrian alpine skier who competed in the 1948 Winter Olympics.

In 1948 he finished eighth in the alpine skiing combined competition and ninth in the alpine skiing downhill event.
