= Matteo Nana =

Italian alpine skier (born 1974)

Matteo Nana (born 25 August 1974) is an Italian former alpine skier who competed in the 1998 Winter Olympics.
