= Norman Bergamelli =

Italian alpine skier (born 1971)

Norman Bergamelli (born 21 October 1971) is an Italian former alpine skier who competed in the 1994 Winter Olympics.

== The four Bergamelli ski brothers ==
The Bergamellis were four brothers, Sergio (born 1970), Norman (born 1971), Thomas (born 1973) and Giancarlo (born 1974), and all four were World Cup alpine skiers.
