= Wanda Bieler =

Italian alpine skier (born 1959)

Personal information
- Born: July 7, 1959 (age 67) Gressoney-Saint-Jean, Italy

Skiing career
- Sport: Alpine skiing

Olympics
- Teams: 2
- Medals: 0

World Championships
- Teams: 3
- Medals: 0

Wanda Bieler (born 7 July 1959) is an Italian former alpine skier who competed internationally in the 1970s and 1980s including at two consecutive Winter Olympic Games.

== Career ==
Bieler qualified for the Slalom, giant slalom and Downhill events at the 1976 Winter Olympics in Innsbruck. She finished in eight place in the slalom, which would be her best overall Olympic performance. She failed to finish her first giant slalom run and placed 20th in the downhill.

Four years later she qualified for the 1980 Winter Olympics in Lake Placid. Although this time she only qualified for the giant slalom. Again, she was to experience disappointment in this event, failing to finish her first run.

Her final international competition would be the 1982 FIS Alpine World Ski Championships in Schladming where she finished in 15th place in the slalom.
