= Paoletta Magoni =

Italian alpine skier (born 1964)

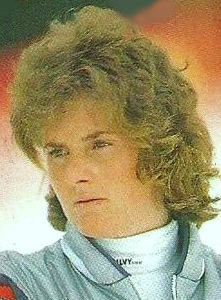

Personal information
- Born: 14 September 1964 (age 61) Selvino, Italy

Skiing career
- Sport: Alpine skiing
- Retired: 1988
- Disciplines: Technical events
- World Cup debut: 1981

Olympics
- Teams: 2
- Medals: 1 (1 gold)

World Championships
- Teams: 2
- Medals: 1

World Cup
- Seasons: 8
- Wins: 1
- Podiums: 3
Medal record
World Cup race podiums
Event	1st	2nd	3rd
Slalom	1	2	0
Total	1	2	0
Olympic Games
Gold medal – first place	1984 Sarajevo	Slalom
World Championships
Bronze medal – third place	1985 Bormio	Slalom

Paola "Paoletta" Magoni (married name Sforza, born 14 September 1964) is an Italian former alpine skier.

== Career ==
At the 1984 Winter Olympics in Sarajevo, she won the slalom event in front of Perrine Pelen and Ursula Konzett. She also won a bronze medal in slalom at the Alpine World Ski Championships 1985 in Bormio.

== World Cup victories ==
Date	Location	Race
14 January 1985	(West Germany) Pfronten	Slalom
