= Rosa Winkel (publisher) =

German gay publishing house (1975–2005)

Verlag rosa Winkel
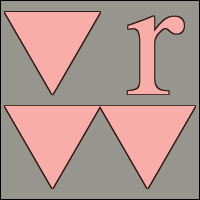
- Status: Defunct
- Founded: 1975
- Defunct: 2005
- Successor: Männerschwarm
- Country of origin: Germany
- Headquarters location: Berlin
- Nonfiction topics: Gay literature

Verlag rosa Winkel was a Berlin book publisher founded in 1975 as the first German-language publishing house of the postwar period devoted to gay literature. It took its name from the pink triangle that gay prisoners in Nazi concentration camps were forced to wear, a symbol reclaimed by the gay movement of the 1970s.

== History ==
The house positioned itself as an element of the German gay movement. Egmont Fassbinder, a notable activist in the West Berlin's gay scene, joined the editorial collective in 1978, and from 1981 ran the publishing venue as its only employee. Fassbinder was among the founders of the Homosexuelle Aktion Westberlin, one of the earliest gay liberation groups in West Germany, and later of the Schwules Museum in Berlin.

Alongside contemporary fiction and research studies, the publisher reprinted key writings of the early German gay movement, with works by Heinrich Hössli, Karl Heinrich Ulrichs, Karl Maria Kertbeny and Magnus Hirschfeld among them. The first books of the comic artist Ralf König also appeared there. For the Schwules Museum, the house published exhibition catalogues, and in 2000 the museum honoured it with a small anniversary show.

The last new title appeared in 2001, and the chronically struggling company was struck from the trade register in 2005. The gay publisher Männerschwarm continued its historical book series, the Bibliothek rosa Winkel, and later took over the remaining stock. Fassbinder died in Berlin in May 2023.
