= Johann Jakob Blumer =

Johann Jakob Blumer may refer to:

- Johann Jakob Blumer (died 1825) (1756–1825), Swiss merchant from Glarus
- Johann Jakob Blumer (politician) (1819–1875), Swiss politician and federal judge, grandson of the above
