= Giuliano Besson =

Italian alpine skier (1950–2025)

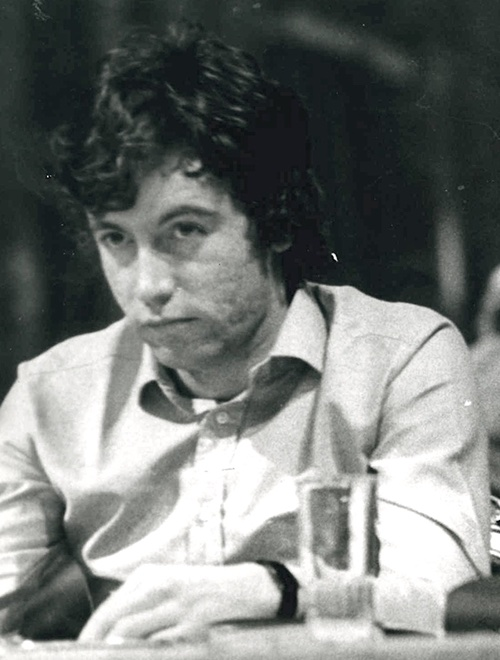
- Besson in the 1970s

Personal information
- Born: 1 January 1950 Sauze d'Oulx, Italy
- Died: 24 October 2025 (aged 75)
- Website: AnziBesson

Skiing career
- Sport: Alpine skiing
- Retired: 1975
- Disciplines: Speed events
- World Cup debut: 1972

Olympics
- Teams: 1

World Cup
- Seasons: 4
- Wins: 0
- Podiums: 1

Giuliano Besson (1 January 1950 – 24 October 2025) was an Italian alpine skier who competed in the 1972 Winter Olympics. He died on 24 October 2025, at the age of 75.

== The twins Anzi and Besson ==
In the 1970s the legend of the two skiers of the valanga azzurra (blue avalanche) was born, Stefano Anzi and Giuliano Besson who were nicknamed i gemelli (the twins) because on two occasions they concluded an important downhill race in the same position, on 7 February 1972 at the 1972 Winter Olympics in Sapporo, Japan both finished in 11th place ex-aequo and on 26 January 1974 both finished in second place still ex-aequo on the legendary Streiff in Kitzbuehl, Austria in a World Cup race.

== World Cup results ==
Besson had one podium in the World Cup.

Podium

Date	Place	Discipline	Rank
26 January 1974	(Austria) Kitzbuehel	Downhill	2nd

== Olympic results ==
Year	Age	Venue	Event	Rank
1972	22	(Japan) Sapporo	Downhill	11
