= Vorder Glärnisch =

Mountain in Switzerland

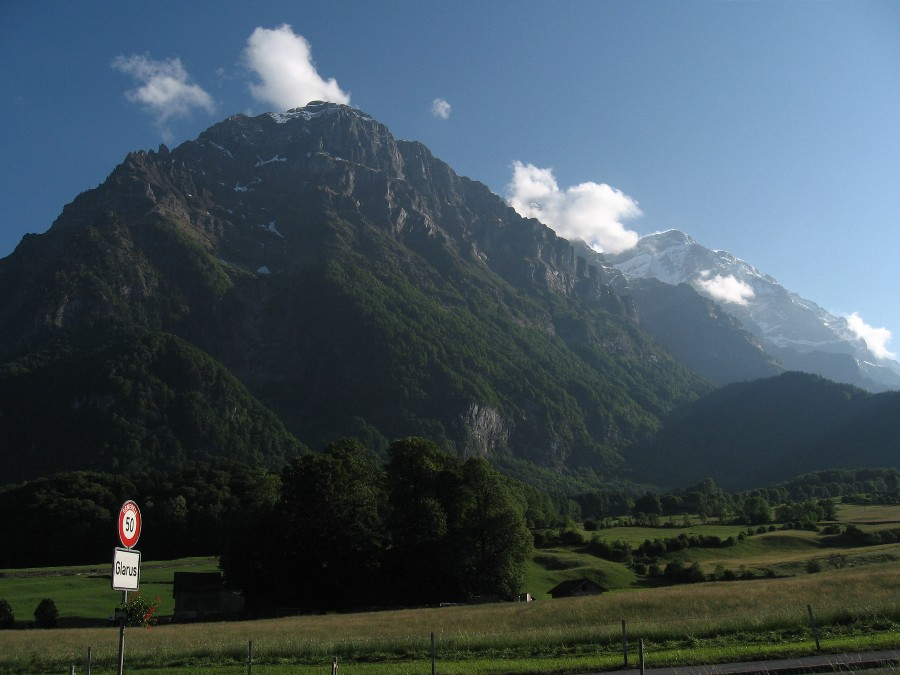
- The Vorder Glärnisch with the higher Glärnisch (background right) from Glarus

Highest point
- Elevation: 2,327 m (7,635 ft)
- Prominence: 267 m (876 ft)
- Parent peak: Glärnisch
- Coordinates: 47°01′19″N 9°02′28″E

Geography
- Location within Switzerland Location within Canton of Glarus
- Country: Switzerland
- Canton: Glarus
- Parent range: Schwyzer Alps

The Vorder Glärnisch (lit. 'Anterior Glärnisch') is a mountain of the Schwyzer Alps, overlooking the valley of the Linth above the town of Glarus in the canton of Glarus, Switzerland. Its summit is at 2,327 metres (7,635 ft) above sea level.

It lies north-east of the higher Glärnisch (2,914 m [9,560 ft]). Unlike its higher neighbour, the Vorder Glärnisch can be ascended via a trail, which is on its north-west side.

== See also ==
- List of mountains of the canton of Glarus
