= Johann Heinrich Streiff =

Swiss textile manufacturer (1709–1780)

- Portrait by Martin Leonz Zeuger, 1752
- Born: 1 January 1709; Glarus, Old Swiss Confederacy
- Died: 28 October 1780 (aged 71); Glarus, Old Swiss Confederacy
- Occupations: Textile manufacturer; politician
- Spouses: Emerentia Zwicky (m. 1733) Margaretha Convert (m. 1757)
- Parents: Fridolin Streiff (father); Susanne Elmer (mother)
- Relatives: Johann Christoph Streiff (brother)

Johann Heinrich Streiff (1 January 1709 – 28 October 1780) was a Swiss textile manufacturer, officer and politician from Glarus. In 1740 he set up the first cotton printing works in the canton of Glarus. He was a member of the council, and from 1768 to 1769 he was the Confederacy's bailiff (Landvogt) in Thurgau.

== Biography ==
Johann Heinrich Streiff was born on 1 January 1709 in Glarus, the son of Fridolin Streiff, a merchant and commander (Kommandant), and Susanne Elmer. His brother was Johann Christoph Streiff. In 1733 he married Emerentia Zwicky, daughter of Franz Zwicky, a lieutenant and school administrator (Schulvogt). In 1757 he married Margaretha Convert, daughter of Pierre-Louis Convert, chief usher (Grossweibel) of La Sagne.

Streiff was successively ensign (Fähnrich), captain (Hauptmann) and major (Landmajor). As a member of the council (Ratsherr), he was sent in 1743 and 1751 to the syndicate of the transalpine bailiwicks (ennetbirgisches Syndikat) in Lugano. From 1768 to 1769 he served as the Confederacy's bailiff (Landvogt) in Thurgau. He twice sought the office of Landammann of Glarus without success.

Streiff was one of the few members of the families of notables (Honoratiorenfamilien) who succeeded in going into business. In 1740 he set up the first cotton printing works in the canton of Glarus, at Oberdorf in Glarus. For the technical side he brought in Jean-Salomon Fazy, of the Fazy, a family of indienne printers from Geneva. In 1761 Streiff obtained permission to use a water wheel on the Oberdorfbach stream, and he installed a calender (a machine with counter-rotating rollers) for the mechanical washing of dyed and printed cloth.

Streiff bought the raw cotton from Cyprus through Venice. He had it spun by home workers in the canton of Glarus and woven in the Appenzell region through putters-out (Verleger). The cloth was bleached in Glarus and, after printing, sold to merchants in Ennenda who had branches abroad and in St. Gallen, Winterthur and Zurich. The works mainly printed handkerchiefs (mouchoirs) and blue- and red-patterned indiennes.

Streiff died in Glarus on 28 October 1780. His sons-in-law Johann Tschudi and Johann Heinrich Blumer continued the printing works, but they separated as early as 1783. The business closed in 1799, during the War of the Second Coalition.

== Bibliography ==
- Johann Jakob Kubly-Müller, Genealogien-Werke des Kantons Glarus, manuscript, n.d. (Landesarchiv des Kantons Glarus, Glarus)
- Adolf Jenny-Trümpy, "Handel und Industrie des Kantons Glarus", in Jahrbuch des Historischen Vereins des Kantons Glarus, 33, 1899, pp. 173–184
- Rolf von Arx, Jürg Davatz and August Rohr, Industriekultur im Kanton Glarus. Streifzüge durch 250 Jahre Geschichte und Architektur, 2005, p. 100
