= Schiesser (surname) =

Schiesser or Schießer is a German surname. Notable people with the surname include:

- Adam Schiesser (1727–1814), Swiss merchant
- Fritz Schiesser (born 1954), Swiss lawyer and politician
- Giaco Schiesser (born 1953), Swiss cultural theorist
- Kaspar Schiesser (1916–2007), Swiss long-distance runner
