= Stefano Anzi =

Italian alpine skier

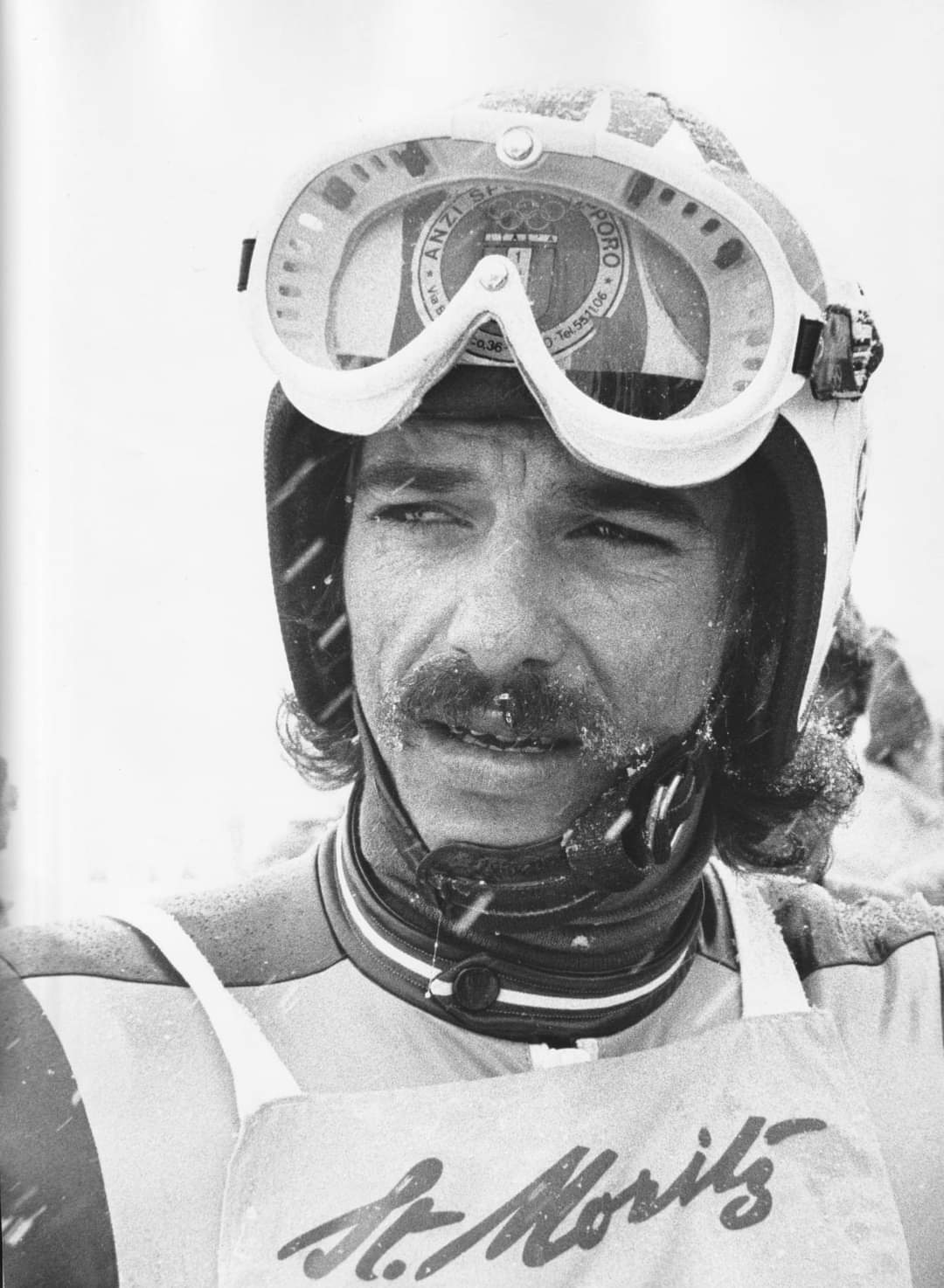
- Anzi in 1974

Personal information
- Born: 21 May 1949 (age 77) Bormio, Italy
- Height: 1.78 m (5 ft 10 in)
- Weight: 70 kg (150 lb)
- Website: AnziBesson

Sport
- Sport: Alpine skiing
- Retired: 1975

Achievements and titles
- Olympic finals: 1

Stefano Anzi (born 21 May 1949) is a retired Italian alpine skier who specialized in the downhill event. He competed at the 1972 Winter Olympics and finished in 11th place. Anzi had three podium positions at individual world cup stages: first and third in 1971 and second in 1974.

== The twins Anzi and Besson ==
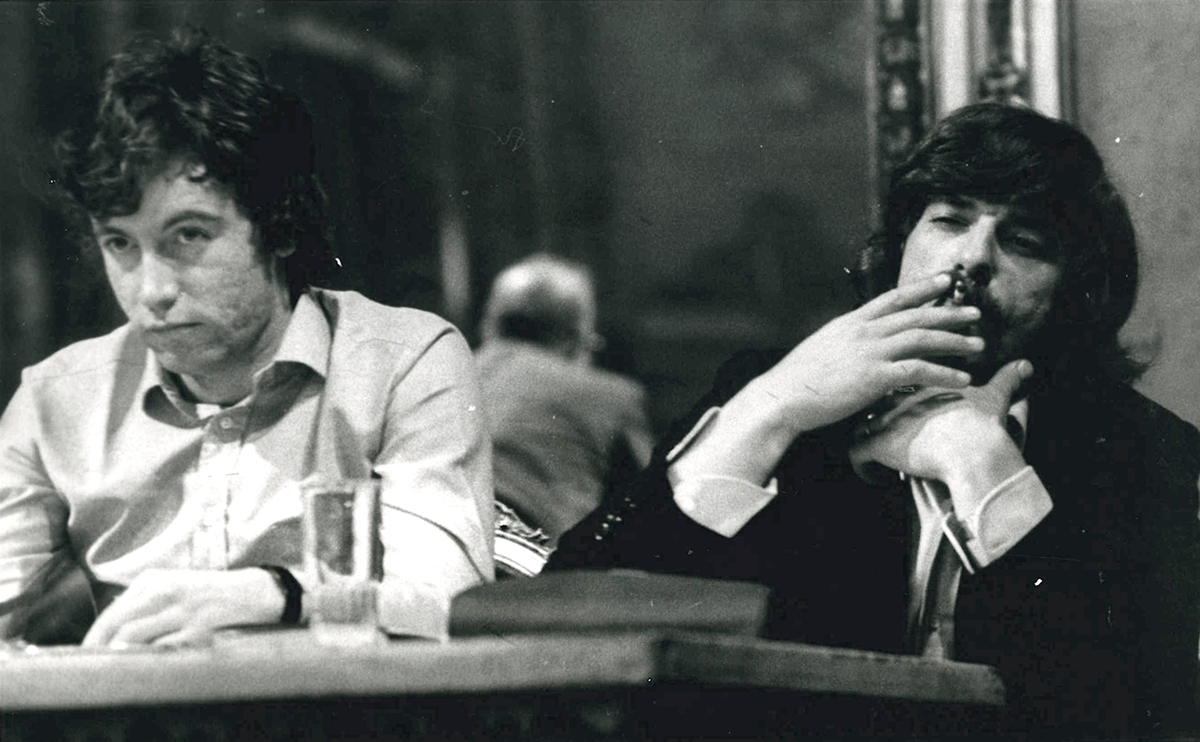
Stefano Anzi (right) with Giuliano Besson in the 1970s

In the 1970s the legend of two skiers of the valanga azzurra (blue avalanche) was born, Stefano Anzi and Giuliano Besson who were nicknamed i gemelli (the twins) because on two occasions they concluded an important downhill race in the same position, on 7 February 1972 at the 1972 Winter Olympics in Sapporo, Japan both finished in 11th place ex-aequo and on 26 January 1974 both finished in second place still ex-aequo on the legendary Streiff in Kitzbuehl, Austria in a World Cup race.

== World Cup results ==
Anzi boasts three podiums in the World Cup.

Podium

Date	Place	Discipline	Rank
18 February 1971	(United States) Sugarloaf	Downhill	3rd
19 February 1971	(United States) Sugarloaf	Downhill	1st
26 January 1974	(Austria) Kitzbuehel	Downhill	2nd

== Olympic results ==
Year	Age	Venue	Event	Rank
1972	22	(Japan) Sapporo	Downhill	11

== See also ==
- Giuliano Besson (his "twin")
