= Johann Jakob Blumer (died 1825) =

Swiss merchant (1756–1825)

- Born: 6 November 1756; Glarus, Old Swiss Confederacy
- Died: 28 November 1825 (aged 69); Glarus, Switzerland
- Occupation: Merchant
- Spouse: Rosina Schiesser (m. 1780)
- Parents: Othmar Blumer (father); Anna Katharina Zweifel (mother)
- Relatives: Johann Heinrich Blumer (brother); Adam Schiesser (father-in-law); Johann Jakob Blumer (grandson)

Johann Jakob Blumer (6 November 1756 – 28 November 1825) was a Swiss merchant from Glarus. From about 1795 to 1815 he built up a library of Enlightenment works that was open to everyone interested, including Oswald Heer, who named a fossil bird after him. During the Helvetic Republic he was a member of the education council of the canton of Linth from 1800 to 1802.

== Biography ==
Johann Jakob Blumer was born on 6 November 1756 in Glarus, the son of Othmar Blumer, a captain (Hauptmann), member of the council (Ratsherr) and merchant, and Anna Katharina Zweifel. His brother was Johann Heinrich Blumer. In 1780 he married Rosina Schiesser, daughter of Adam Schiesser. He was the grandfather of Johann Jakob Blumer (1819–1875).

From 1772 to 1774 Blumer was a pupil at the Philanthropin school at Marschlins Castle. He then continued his education at Pfeffel's institute in Colmar, Alsace, and in Neuchâtel. He became a merchant (Handelsherr). After his marriage he spent a long time in northern Italy.

From about 1795 to 1815 Blumer built up a library of Enlightenment works, which was open to everyone interested, among them Oswald Heer. Heer named the fossil bird of the Sernf valley, Protornis Blumeri, after him. The natural history collection that Blumer assembled is lost.

During the Helvetic Republic, Blumer was a member of the education council (Erziehungsrat) of the canton of Linth from 1800 to 1802. In 1803, as an admirer of Pestalozzi, he promoted Pestalozzi's school books. He died in Glarus on 28 November 1825.

== Bibliography ==
- W. Blumer, Geschichte der Blumer, 1960, 102–104
