= Johann Heinrich Blumer =

Swiss textile manufacturer (1753–1844)

- Born: 23 June 1753; Glarus, Old Swiss Confederacy
- Died: 6 May 1844 (aged 90); Glarus, Switzerland
- Occupation: Textile manufacturer
- Spouse: Anna Maria Streiff (m. 1778)
- Parents: Othmar Blumer (father); Anna Katharina Zweifel (mother)
- Relatives: Johann Jakob Blumer (brother); Johann Heinrich Streiff (father-in-law)

Johann Heinrich Blumer (23 June 1753 – 6 May 1844) was a Swiss textile manufacturer from Glarus. In 1780 he took over the textile factory of his father-in-law, Johann Heinrich Streiff; the blue- and red-patterned indiennes made there sold well because of their high quality. As an active supporter of the Helvetic Republic he met with hostility in Glarus, and in 1799 he gave up the business and fled to Zurich.

== Biography ==
Johann Heinrich Blumer was born on 23 June 1753 in Glarus, the son of Othmar Blumer, a captain (Hauptmann), member of the council (Ratsherr) and merchant, and Anna Katharina Zweifel. His brother was Johann Jakob Blumer. In 1778 he married Anna Maria Streiff, daughter of Johann Heinrich Streiff.

In 1780 Blumer took over his father-in-law's textile factory. The blue- and red-patterned indiennes made there sold well because of their high quality.

Blumer was an active supporter of the Helvetic Republic, for which he met with hostility in Glarus. In 1799 he gave up the business, which had been shut down because of the turmoil of war. On 25 September 1799 he fled via the Klöntal and Schwyz to Zurich, and he later moved to Wädenswil. He died in Glarus on 6 May 1844.

== Bibliography ==
- F. Gallati, "Glarus im Herbst 1799", in Jahrbuch des Historischen Vereins des Kantons Glarus, 58, 1958, 45–62
- W. Blumer, Geschichte der Blumer, 1960, 94–96
