= Adam Schiesser =

Swiss merchant (1727–1814)

- Born: 9 April 1727; Diesbach-Dornhaus, Glarus, Old Swiss Confederacy
- Died: 28 October 1814 (aged 87); Diesbach-Dornhaus, Glarus, Switzerland
- Occupations: Merchant; politician
- Spouse: Anna Katharina Tschudi (m. 1753)
- Parents: Johannes Schiesser (father); Rosina Legler (mother)
- Relatives: Johann Jakob Blumer (son-in-law)

Adam Schiesser (9 April 1727 – 28 October 1814) was a Swiss merchant and politician from the canton of Glarus. Around 1755 he and Kaspar Jenny founded the firm Jenny & Schiesser, which had branches in Bologna, Ancona and Pesaro, imported Levantine raw cotton and grain, and exported printed cotton fabrics. He held high cantonal offices, and at the end of the 18th century he was considered one of the richest citizens of Glarus.

== Biography ==
Adam Schiesser was born on 9 April 1727 in Diesbach-Dornhaus, now part of the municipality of Glarus Süd, the son of Johannes Schiesser, a village bailiff (Dorfvogt), and Rosina Legler. In 1753 he married Anna Katharina Tschudi, daughter of Melchior Tschudi, an innkeeper. In 1780 his daughter Rosina married the merchant Johann Jakob Blumer.

Schiesser was first a hand spinner. He then traded in cotton yarn and had business relations with the textile center of St. Gallen. Around 1755 he joined with Kaspar Jenny (1725–1804) to form the firm Jenny & Schiesser, with establishments in Glarus and St. Gallen and branches in Bologna, Ancona and Pesaro. The firm imported Levantine raw cotton and grain, and exported printed cotton fabrics.

Schiesser provided the canton (Land) of Glarus with a luxurious coach, and he also held high cantonal offices. In 1766–1767 he was treasurer (Landesseckelmeister) of Glarus, and from 1778 a member of the council (Ratsherr). From 1768 to 1798 he was a member of the council of war (Kriegsrat), and from 1777 to 1798 salt commissioner (Salzherr).

Around 1773 Schiesser had the mansion (Herrenhaus) zum Sunnezyt built, and at the end of the 18th century he was considered one of the richest citizens of the canton of Glarus. He died in Diesbach-Dornhaus on 28 October 1814. The firm was liquidated in 1815–1820.

== Bibliography ==
- E. Knüsli, "Das Haus 'zum Sunnezyt' in Diesbach", in Neujahrsbote für das Glarner Hinterland 6, 1972, 7–29
- R. von Arx, Glarner Handelshäuser im 18. Jahrhundert, manuscript, [2002], 8–12 (Landesarchiv des Kantons Glarus)
