= Riedern =

- Former municipality
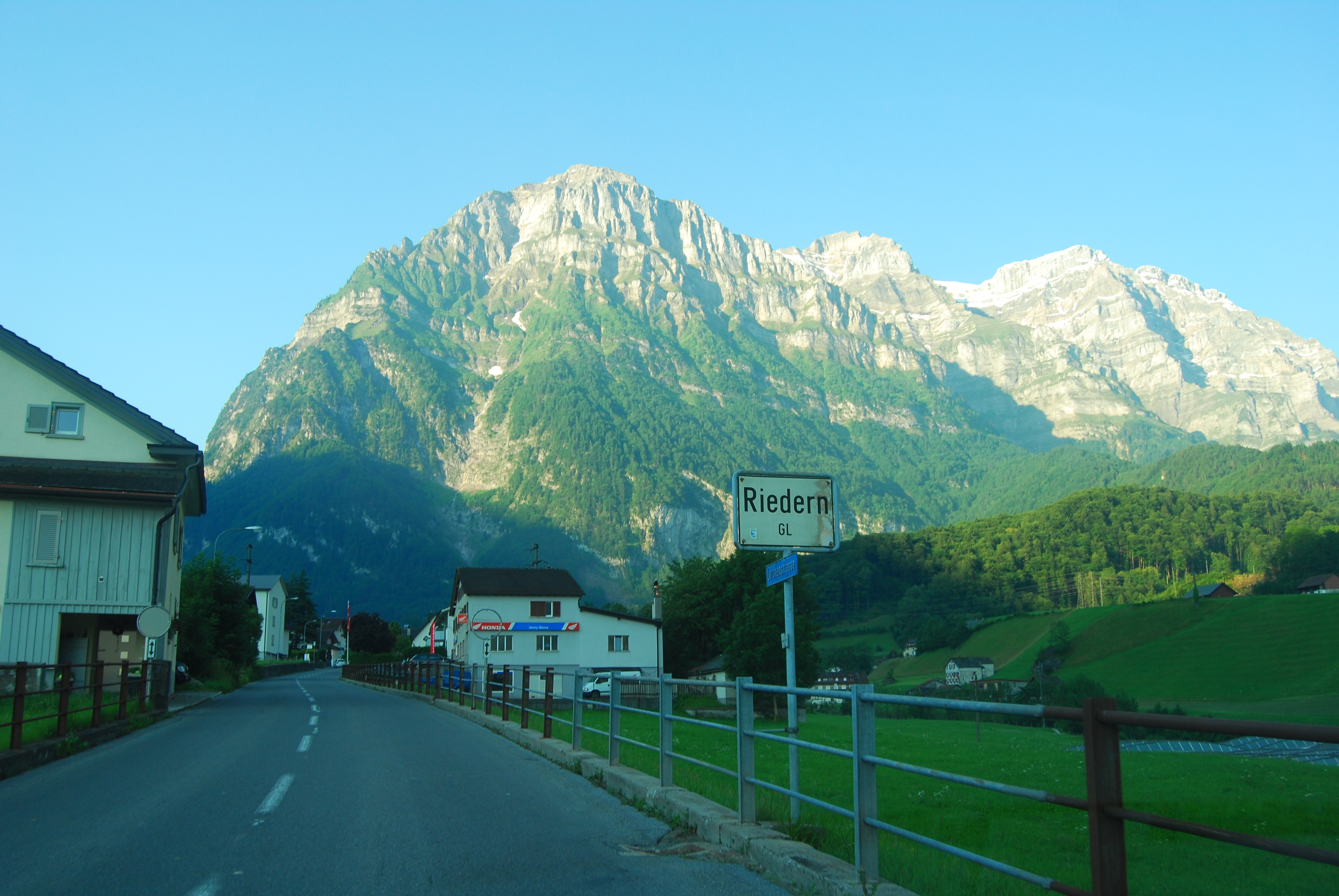

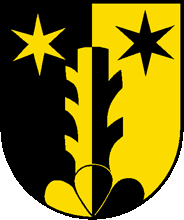
- Coat of arms
- Location of Riedern
- Location within Switzerland Location within Canton of Glarus
- Coordinates: 47°2′N 9°3′E
- Country: Switzerland
- Canton: Glarus
- District: n.a.

Area
  - Total: 1.51 km^{2} (0.58 sq mi)
- Elevation: 529 m (1,736 ft)

Population (December 2020)
  - Total: 734
  - Density: 486/km^{2} (1,260/sq mi)
- Time zone: UTC+01:00 (CET)
  - Summer (DST): UTC+02:00 (CEST)
- Postal code: 8750
- SFOS number: 1625
- ISO 3166 code: CH-GL
- Surrounded by: Glarus, Netstal
- Website: www.riedern.ch

Riedern is a former municipality in the canton of Glarus in Switzerland. Effective from 1 January 2011, Riedern is part of the municipality of Glarus.

== History ==
Aerial view from 1500 m by Walter Mittelholzer (1925)

Riedern is first mentioned in 1350 as Riedern.

== Geography ==
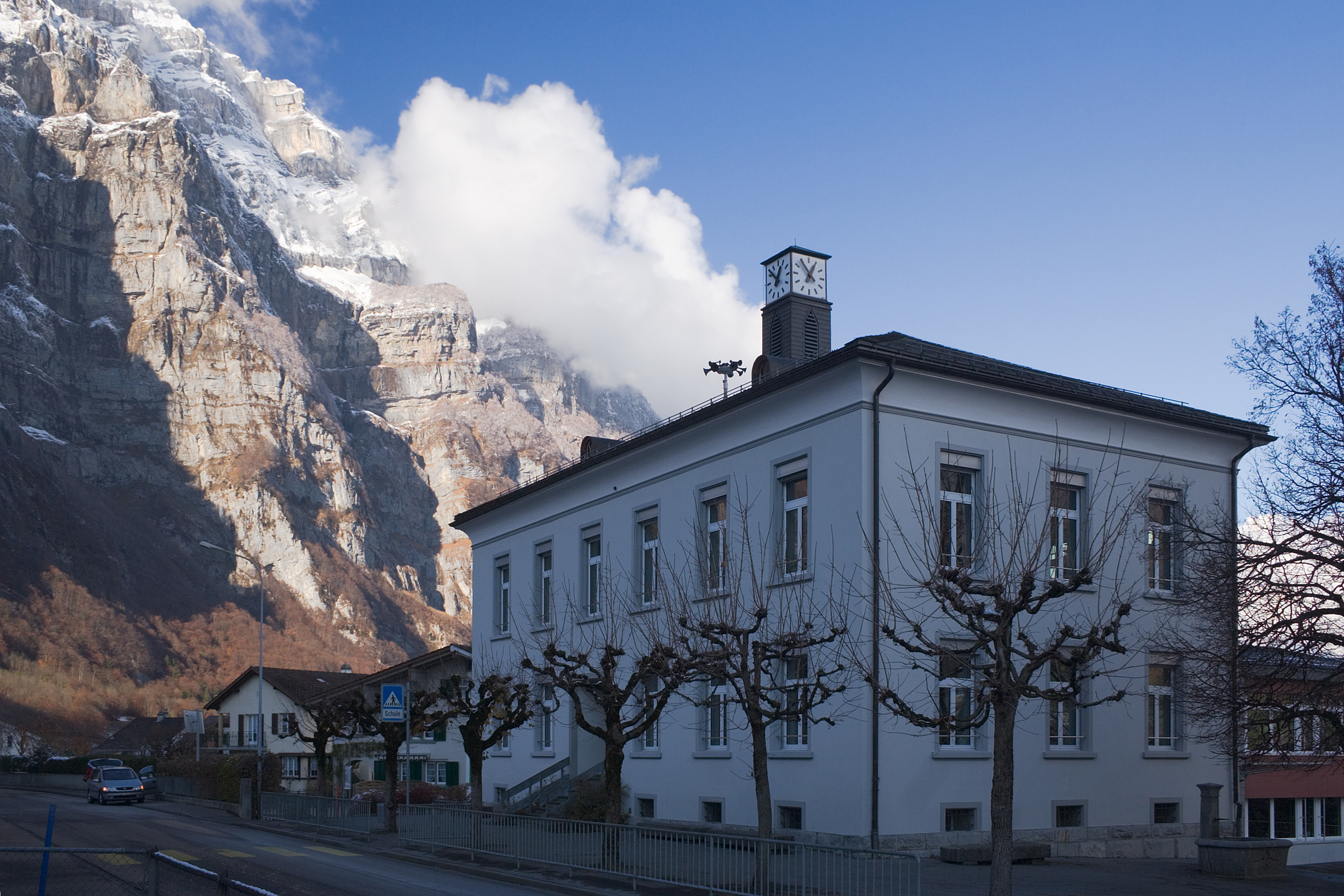
Riedern school house

Riedern has an area, as of 2006, of 1.5 km^{2} (0.58 sq mi). Of this area, 23.8% is used for agricultural purposes, while 53.6% is forested. Of the rest of the land, 13.2% is settled (buildings or roads) and the remainder (9.3%) is non-productive (rivers, glaciers or mountains).

Riedern is at the entrance to the Klöntal and is north-west of Glarus.

== Demographics ==
Riedern had a population (as of 2010) of 734. As of 2007, 16.3% of the population was made up of foreign nationals. Over the last 10 years the population has grown at a rate of 13.8%. Most of the population (as of 2000) speaks German (82.3%), with Italian being second most common ( 8.4%) and Turkish being third ( 4.5%).

In the 2007 federal election the most popular party was the SPS which received 49% of the vote. Most of the rest of the votes went to the SVP with 39.6% of the vote.

About 62.4% of the population (between age 25-64) have completed either non-mandatory upper secondary education or additional higher education (either University or a Fachhochschule).

Riedern has an unemployment rate of 2.31%. As of 2005, there were 12 people employed in the primary economic sector and about 5 businesses involved in this sector. 41 people are employed in the secondary sector and there are 7 businesses in this sector. 35 people are employed in the tertiary sector, with 13 businesses in this sector.

The historical population is given in the following table:

| year | population |
|---|---|
| 1777 | 102 Adult Males |
| 1850 | 341 |
| 1900 | 556 |
| 1950 | 660 |
| 2000 | 622 |
| 2005 | 740 |
