= Netstal =

- Former municipality
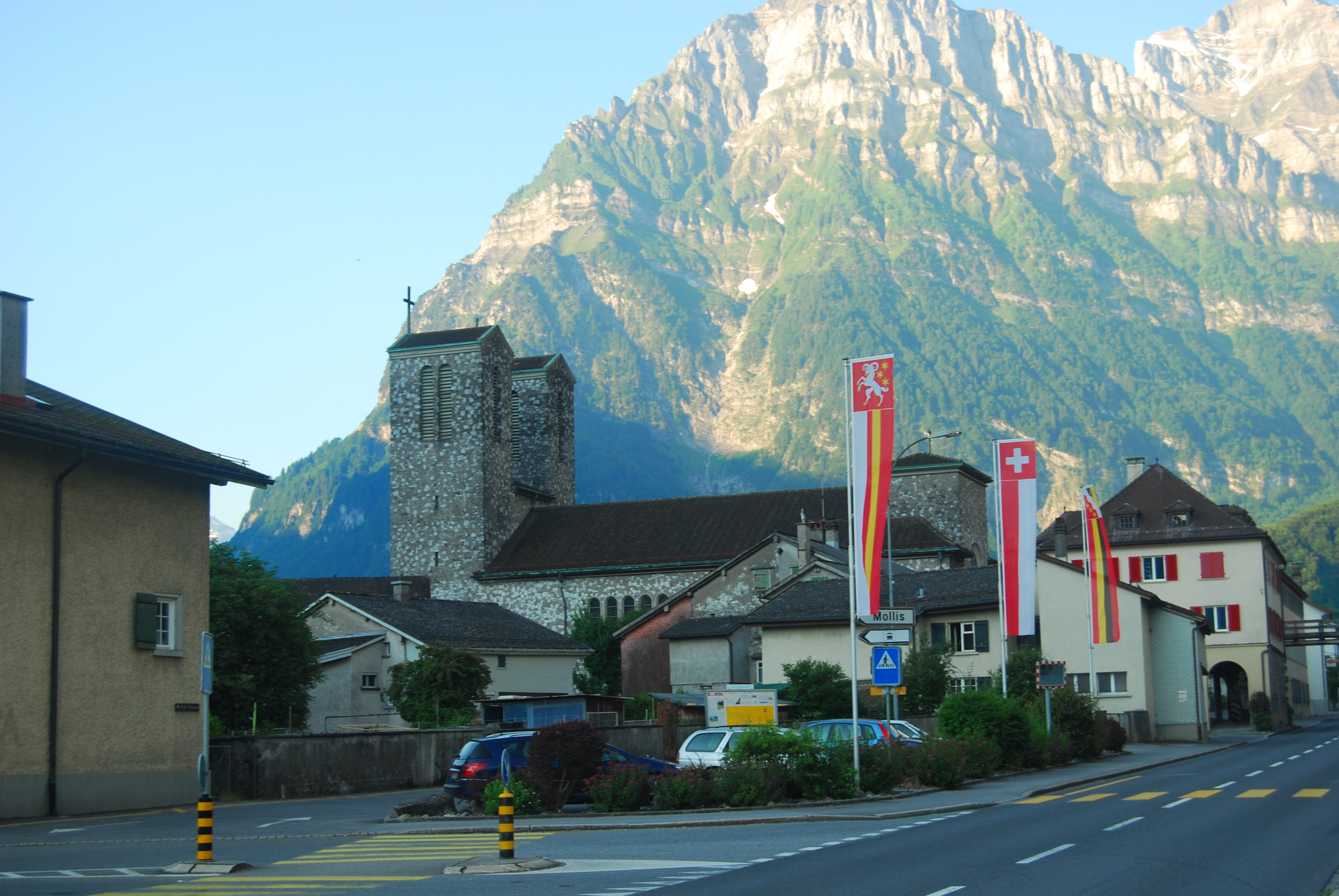
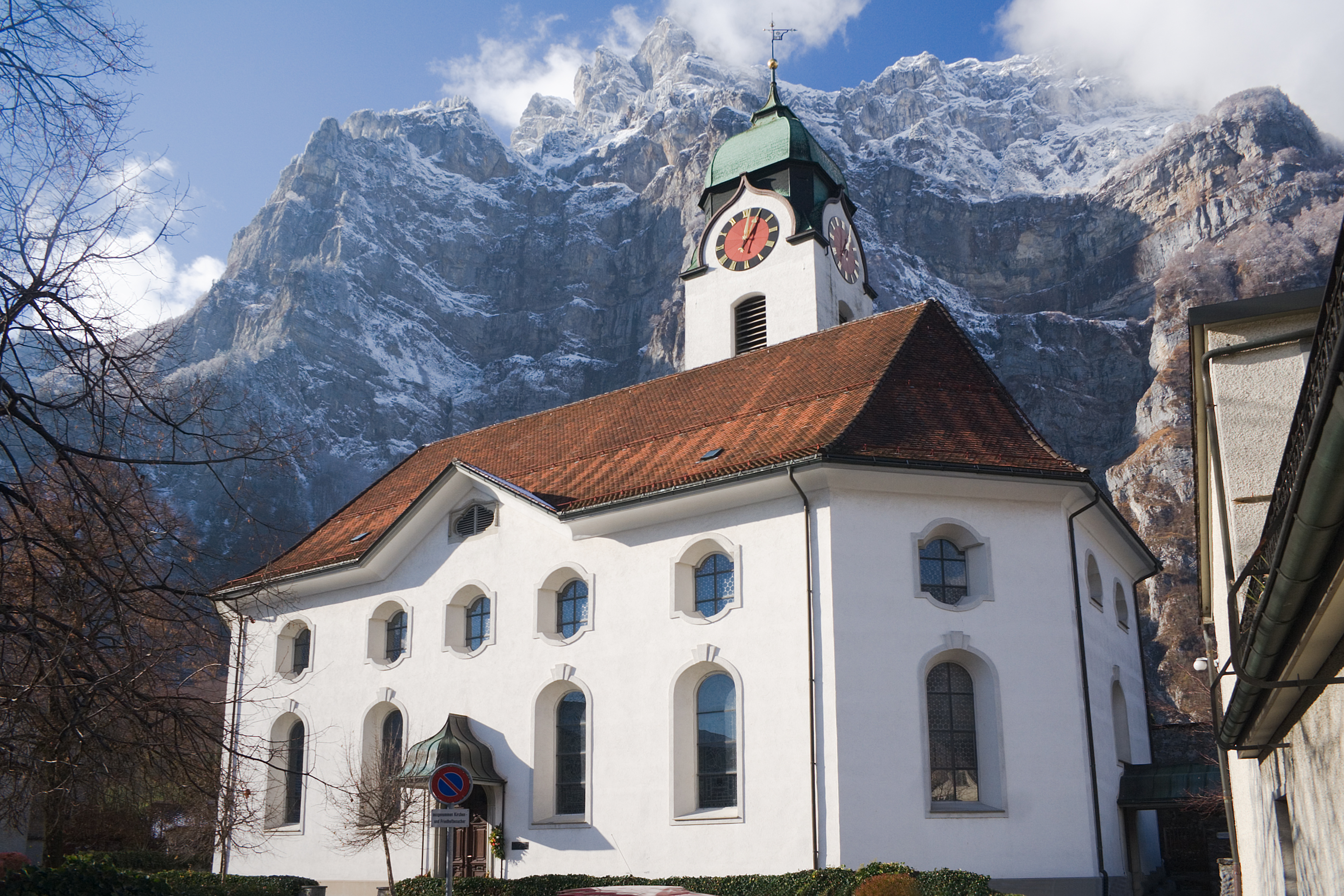

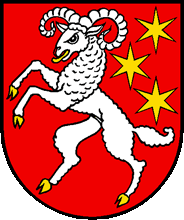
- Coat of arms
- Location of Netstal
- Location within Switzerland Location within Canton of Glarus
- Coordinates: 47°04′N 9°03′E
- Country: Switzerland
- Canton: Glarus
- District: n.a.

Area
  - Total: 10.63 km^{2} (4.10 sq mi)
- Elevation: 464 m (1,522 ft)

Population (December 2020)
  - Total: 2,875
  - Density: 270.5/km^{2} (700.5/sq mi)
- Time zone: UTC+01:00 (CET)
  - Summer (DST): UTC+02:00 (CEST)
- Postal code: 8754
- SFOS number: 1620
- ISO 3166 code: CH-GL
- Surrounded by: Ennenda, Glarus, Mollis, Näfels, Riedern
- Website: www.netstal.ch

Netstal is a former municipality in the canton of Glarus in Switzerland. Effective from 1 January 2011, Netstal is part of the municipality of Glarus.

== History ==
Netstal is first mentioned in 1289 as Netstal.

During the French Revolutionary Wars, in the combat of Netstal, the Russians forced the French troops to retreat.

== Geography ==
Aerial view from 300 m by Walter Mittelholzer (between 1923 and 1927)

Netstal has an area, as of 2006, of 10.7 km^{2} (4.1 sq mi). Of this area, 30.8% is used for agricultural purposes, while 32.8% is forested. Of the rest of the land, 9.6% is settled (buildings or roads) and the remainder (26.9%) is non-productive (rivers, glaciers or mountains).

Netstal is located in the Glarner Mittelland on the eastern foot of the Wiggis mountain and at the confluence of the Löntsch river (from the Klöntal) into the Linth river. It consists of the hamlets of Netstal, Leuzingen and Löntschen.

== Demographics ==
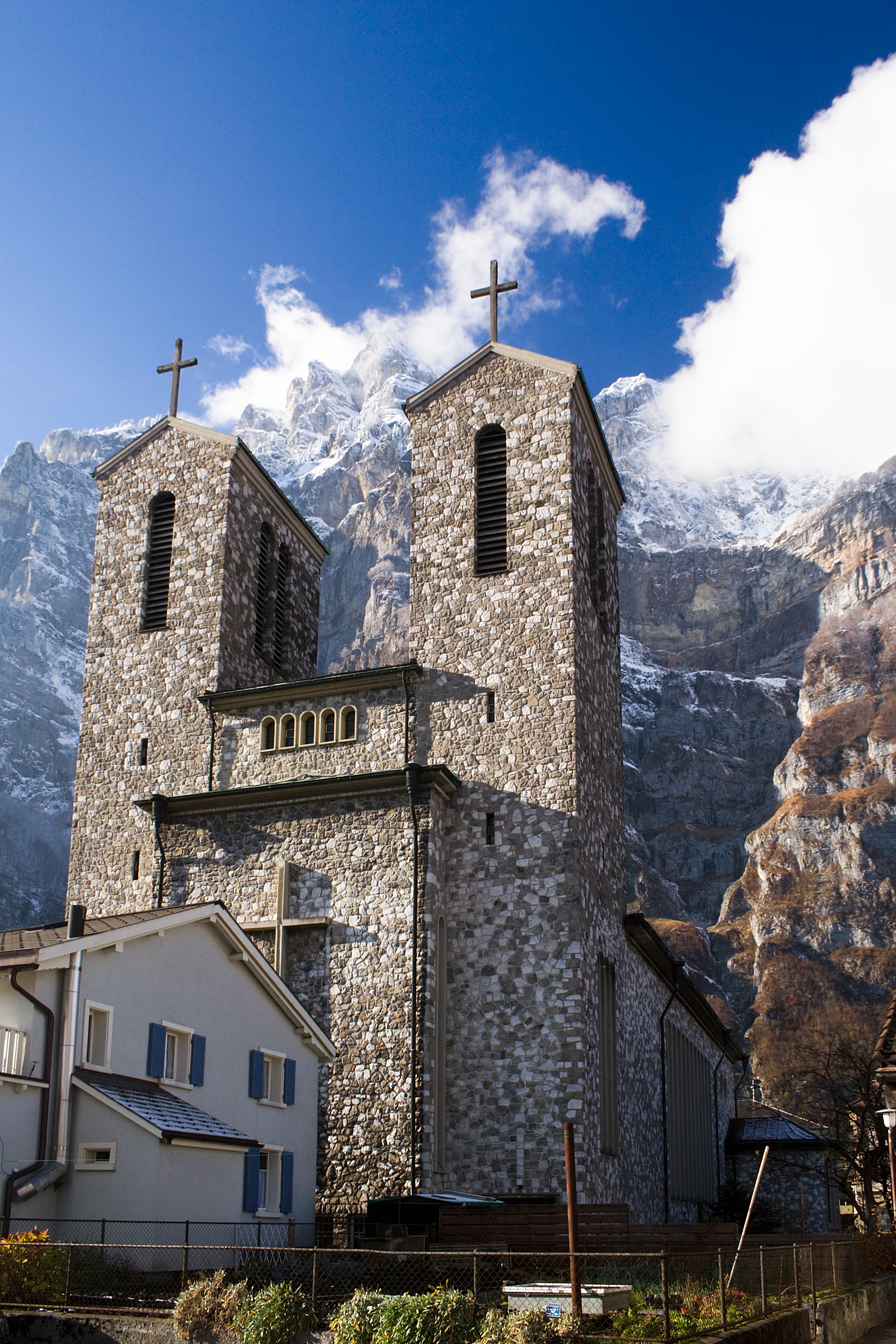
Netstal Catholic Church

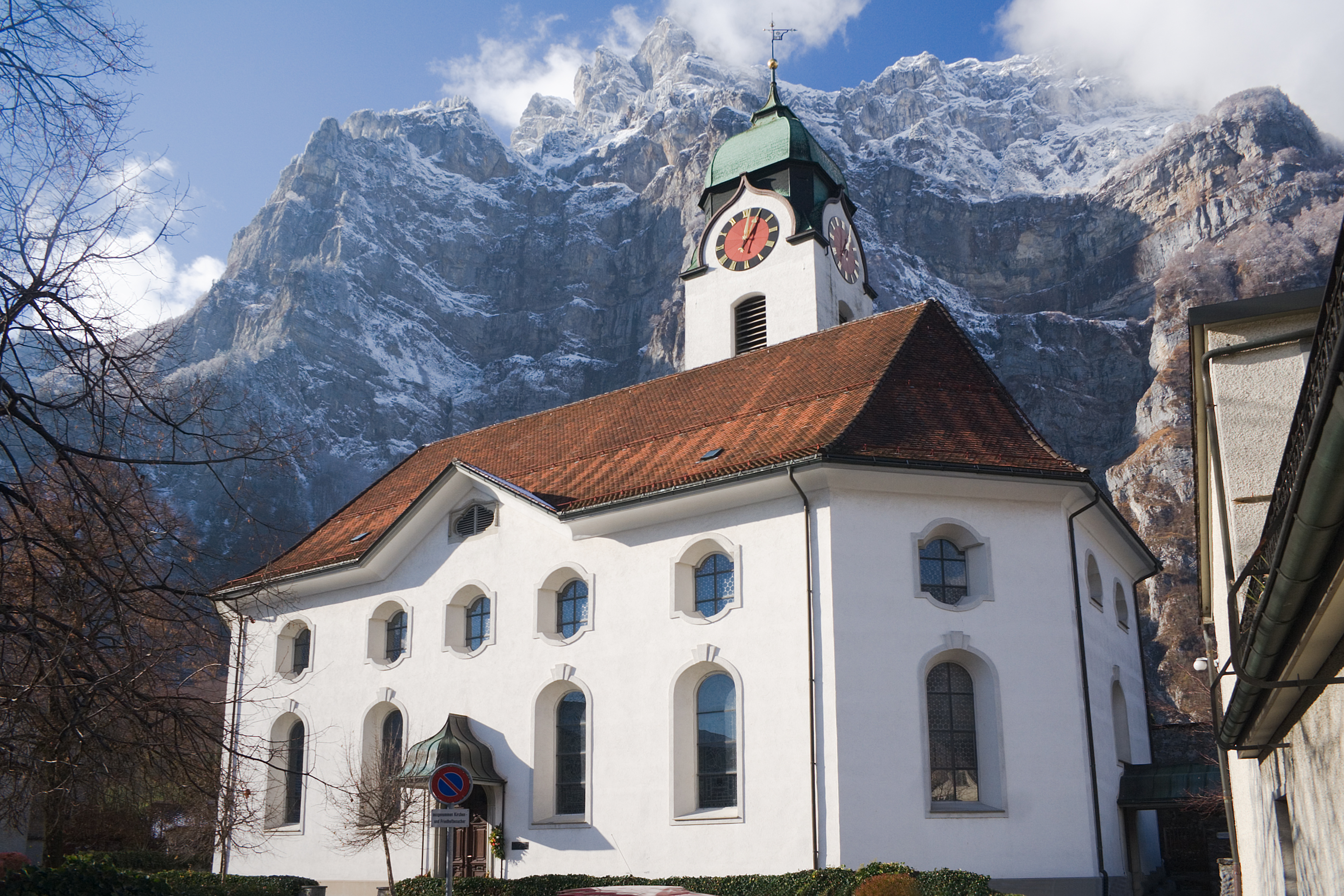
Netstal Swiss Reformed Church

Netstal had a population (as of 2010) of 2,875. As of 2007, 25.4% of the population was made up of foreign nationals. Over the last 10 years the population has grown at a rate of 2.3%. Most of the population (as of 2000) speaks German (79.9%), with Italian being second most common ( 6.9%) and Albanian being third ( 4.1%).

In the 2007 federal election the most popular party was the SPS which received 50.8% of the vote. Most of the rest of the votes went to the SVP with 39.7% of the vote.

In Netstal about 59.4% of the population (between age 25-64) have completed either non-mandatory upper secondary education or additional higher education (either University or a Fachhochschule).

Netstal has an unemployment rate of 1.51%. As of 2005, there were 41 people employed in the primary economic sector and about 18 businesses involved in this sector. 816 people are employed in the secondary sector and there are 51 businesses in this sector. 739 people are employed in the tertiary sector, with 95 businesses in this sector.

The historical population is given in the following table:

| year | population |
|---|---|
| 1799 | 1,372 |
| 1850 | 2,101 |
| 1900 | 2,003 |
| 1950 | 2,654 |
| 2000 | 2,813 |
| 2015 | 2,913 |

== Transport ==
Netstal railway station is on the Weesen to Linthal railway line. It is served by the Zürich S-Bahn service S25 between Linthal and Zürich, and by the St. Gallen S-Bahn service S6 between Rapperswil and Schwanden. As of the December 2023 timetable change, both services operate once per hour, combining to provide two trains per hour between Ziegelbrücke and Schwanden.
