= Johann Christoph Streiff =

Swiss politician (1701–1757)

- Born: 30 July 1701; Glarus, Old Swiss Confederacy
- Died: 2 November 1757 (aged 56); Glarus, Old Swiss Confederacy
- Occupation: Politician
- Spouse: Anna Katharina Schmid (m. 1725)
- Parents: Fridolin Streiff (father); Susanne Elmer (mother)
- Relatives: Johann Heinrich Streiff (brother)

Johann Christoph Streiff (30 July 1701 – 2 November 1757) was a Swiss politician from Glarus. He was bailiff of the County of Werdenberg from 1734 to 1737 and twice Landammann of Glarus, in 1743–1746 and 1753–1756. In 1757 he was elected bailiff in the Rheintal, but he died before taking office.

== Biography ==
Johann Christoph Streiff was born on 30 July 1701 in Glarus, the son of Fridolin Streiff, a merchant and commander (Kommandant), and Susanne Elmer. His brother was Johann Heinrich Streiff. In 1725 he married Anna Katharina Schmid, daughter of Samuel Schmid, a pastor.

Streiff held the offices of Schatzvogt and ensign (Fähnrich), and in 1729 he became a member of the council (Ratsherr). From 1734 to 1737 he was bailiff (Landvogt) of the County of Werdenberg, and he was an envoy to the syndicate of the transalpine bailiwicks (ennetbirgisches Syndikat) in Lugano. He was deputy Landammann (Landesstatthalter) in 1741–1742 and 1751–1752, and Landammann of Glarus in 1743–1746 and 1753–1756.

In the 1730s, in a dispute with Zurich, Streiff campaigned for the admission of Glarus clergy in the common lordship (gemeine Herrschaft) of Thurgau.

In 1757 Streiff was elected bailiff in the Rheintal, but he died in Glarus on 2 November 1757, before taking office. His son-in-law Heinrich Marti took over the office.

== Bibliography ==
- Johann Jakob Kubly-Müller, Genealogien-Werke des Kantons Glarus, manuscript, n.d. (Landesarchiv des Kantons Glarus, Glarus)
- J. J. Kubly-Müller, "Die Landammänner von Glarus 1242–1928", in Jahrbuch des Historischen Vereins des Kantons Glarus, 47, 1934, 200–202, 207
