= Streiff =

Streiff is a surname. Notable people with the surname include:

- Christian Streiff (born 1954), businessman
- Daniel Streiff, Swiss curler, European champion
- Johann Christoph Streiff (1701–1757), Swiss politician
- Johann Heinrich Streiff (1709–1780), Swiss textile manufacturer
- Patrick Streiff (born 1955), bishop
- Philippe Streiff (born 1955), racing driver
- Rösli Streiff (1901–1997), skier
- Streiff (horse) the horse of Gustavus Adolphus at the battle of Lützen 1632.

== See also ==
- Hallermann-Streiff syndrome
