= Karl Maria Kertbeny =

Austrian-Hungarian wordsmith and gay rights activist (1824–1882)

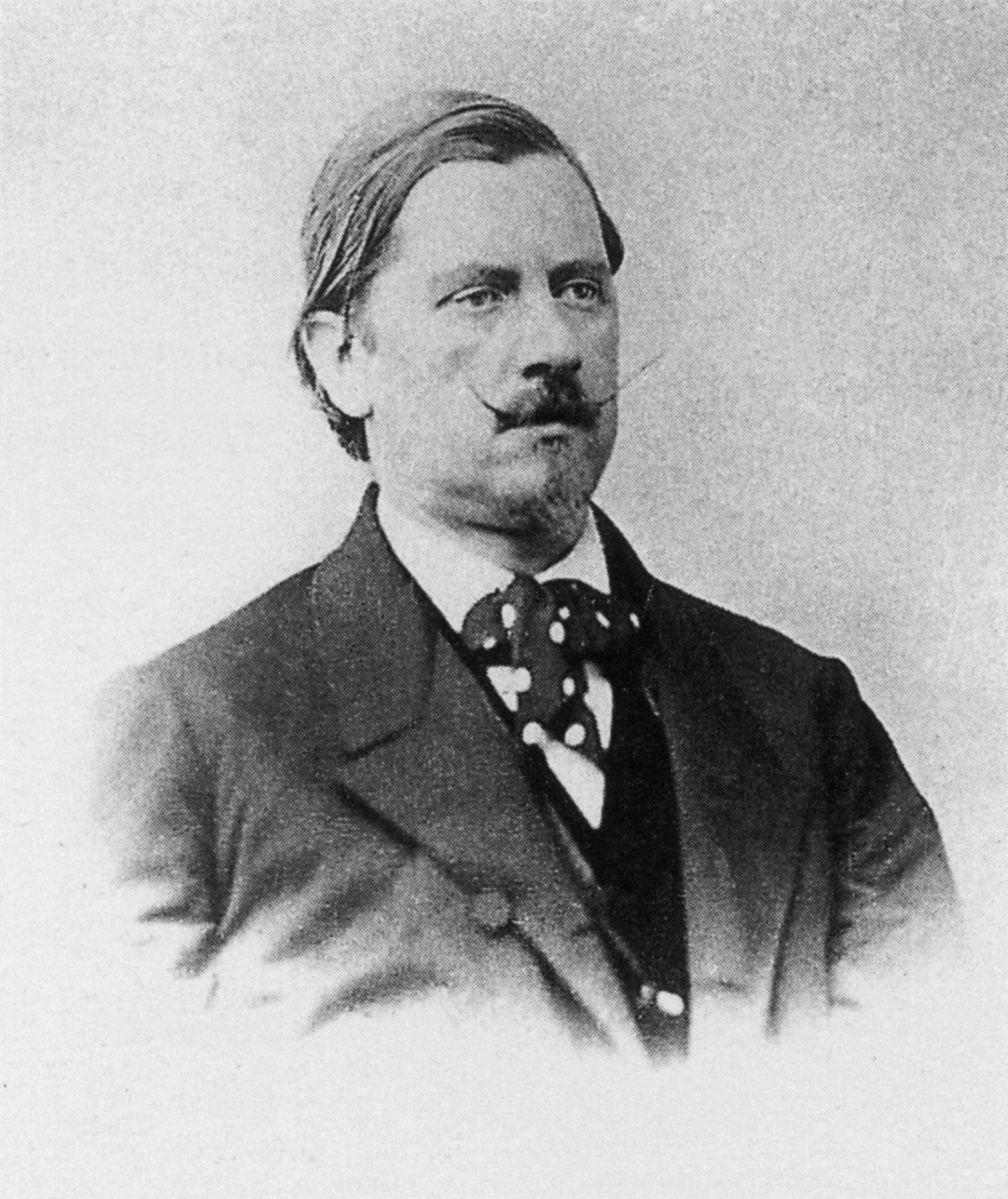
- Karl Maria Kertbeny, ca. 1865
- Born: Karl Maria Benkert; 28 February 1824; Vienna, Imp.-R. Austrian Empire
- Died: 23 January 1882 (aged 57); Budapest, Royal of Hungary, Imp. & R. Austria-Hungary
- Other name: Kertbeny Károly Mária
- Occupations: Journalist, translator, memoirist, human rights campaigner
- Known for: Campaigning for gay rights, coining the terms homosexual and heterosexual (as the German nouns Homosexualität and Heterosexualität)

Karl Maria Kertbeny, born German: Karl Maria Benkert, German: [ˈbɛŋkɐt]; also Hungarian: Kertbeny Károly, Kertbeny Károly Mária, (eredetileg) Benkert Károly Mária; 28 February 1824 – 23 January 1882) was an Austrian-born Hungarian journalist, translator, memoirist and human rights campaigner. Kertbeny coined the words heterosexual and homosexual as the German nouns Heterosexualität and Homosexualität.

He translated works by Hungarian poets and writers Sándor Petőfi, János Arany and Mór Jókai into German. Among his acquaintances were Heinrich Heine, George Sand, Alfred de Musset, Hans Christian Andersen, Karl Marx, and the Brothers Grimm.

== Early life ==
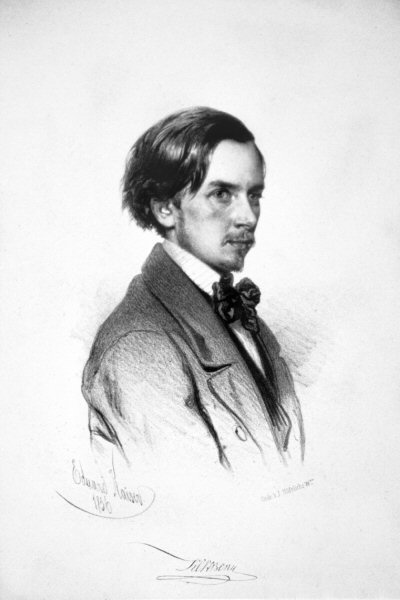

Karl Maria Benkert was born in Vienna into an artistic Hungarian family on 28 February 1824. He moved with his family to Budapest when he was a child and was equally fluent in German and Hungarian. After a stint in the Hungarian army, Benkert made a living as a journalist and travel writer and wrote at least twenty-five books on various subjects.

== Career ==
Benkert left Hungary and was determined to become an advocate on behalf of Hungarian culture. He, therefore, arranged for his legal name to take the Hungarian form under which he lived and published for most of his life. Final approval on 22 February 1848 made him Kertbeny Károly Mária or, in the standard way of rendering a Hungarian name in other European languages, Károly Mária Kertbeny.

He made a variety of contacts in his travels. He was Charles Baudelaire's only personal Austro-Hungarian contact.

In his fiction, quite apart from his political advocacy, Kertbeny included homosexual characters in several works, including Erinnerungen an Charles Sealsfield, Spiegelbilder der Erinnerung and the short story "Im Walde".

=== Writings on sexuality ===
He settled in Berlin in 1868, when he was still unmarried at 44. Kertbeny claimed in his writings to be "normally sexed". However, his diaries list a self-censored string of encounters with youths and men ("young barber lad"; "very much in love with the lad"; "I have done it"), and recurring fear following the arrest of Karl Heinrich Ulrichs with whom he corresponded ("Awful days!.... Horrible nightmares. I have burnt all the dangerous letters"), which suggest he was secretly homosexual.

He explained his interest in sexual minorities as his "instinctive drive to take issue with every injustice". He cited as a formative experience from his teenage years the suicide of a co-worker who was being blackmailed and threatened with exposure as a homosexual.

In 1869, he published two anonymous pamphlets. (Note: Paragraph 143 of the Prussian Penal Code of 14 April 1851 and Its Reaffirmation as Paragraph 152 in the Proposed Penal Code for the North German Confederation. An Open and Professional Correspondence to His Excellency Dr. Adolph Leonhardt, Royal Prussian Minister of Justice.) He argued that the Prussian sodomy law, Paragraph 143, which later became Paragraph 175 of the penal code of the German Empire, violated the "rights of man". He advanced the classic liberal argument that consensual sexual acts in private should not be subject to criminal law. He contended that the Prussian law allowed blackmailers to extort money from homosexuals and often drove them to suicide.

Whether sexual preference was innate was called by Kertbeny "a very interesting riddle of nature" that was best excluded from arguments for the decriminalization of sexual practices. Instead, he considered the right of a government to intervene in private matters. He wrote:

We should convince our opponents that exactly according to their legal notions they do not have anything to do with this inclination, let it be innate or voluntary, because the state does not have the right to intervene in what is happening between two consenting people aged over 14, excluding publicity [in private], not hurting the rights of any third party.

On the other hand, he repeatedly described one's sexual drive as "innate and unchanging". That contradicted the dominant view up to that time of men committing "sodomy" out of mere wickedness. Homosexual men, he said, were not by nature effeminate, and he pointed out to a more virile vision of love between men, mentioning that many of the great heroes of history were same-sex lovers. With Heinrich Hössli and Karl Heinrich Ulrichs, he was among the first writers to put those now-familiar arguments before the public.

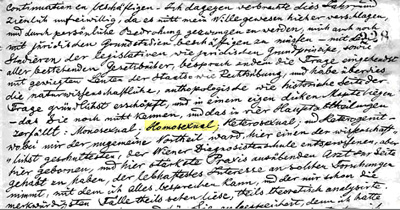
First use of the words Monosexual, Homosexual, and Heterosexual in a letter written on 6 May 1868

In a letter written on 6 May 1868, Kertbeny published, in German the terms homosexual and heterosexual as part of his system for defining sexual types to replace the pejorative terms sodomite and pederast, which were used in the German- and French-speaking world of his time. In addition, he called those who masturbate monosexualists, practitioners of anal intercourse pygists, those who have sex with animals heterogenists, and a man who prefers women sexually normalsexuals (English: normosexual), term of which he used to describe himself. The concept of bisexuality was named as Doppelsexualität (English: double sexuality).

He also used German terms that did not influence his contemporaries but suggest how he was considering terms that did not rely on classical languages, including die Gleichegeschlechtlichen ("those of the same sex") and der Gleichegeschlechtlicher Akt ("the same-sex act").

Kertbeny made no further contribution to the debates about homosexuality or its legal status or origins. In 1880, he offered a chapter on homosexuality for Gustav Jäger to include in his book Discovery of the Soul, but Jäger's publisher decided that it was too controversial and omitted it. Jäger nevertheless used Kertbeny's terminology elsewhere in the book. (Note: The German sex researcher Richard von Krafft-Ebing, in his Psychopathia Sexualis (1886), borrowed the terms homosexual and heterosexual from Jäger's book. Krafft-Ebing's work was so influential that they became the standard terms for differences in sexual orientation and superseded Ulrichs's word, Urning.)

== Death ==
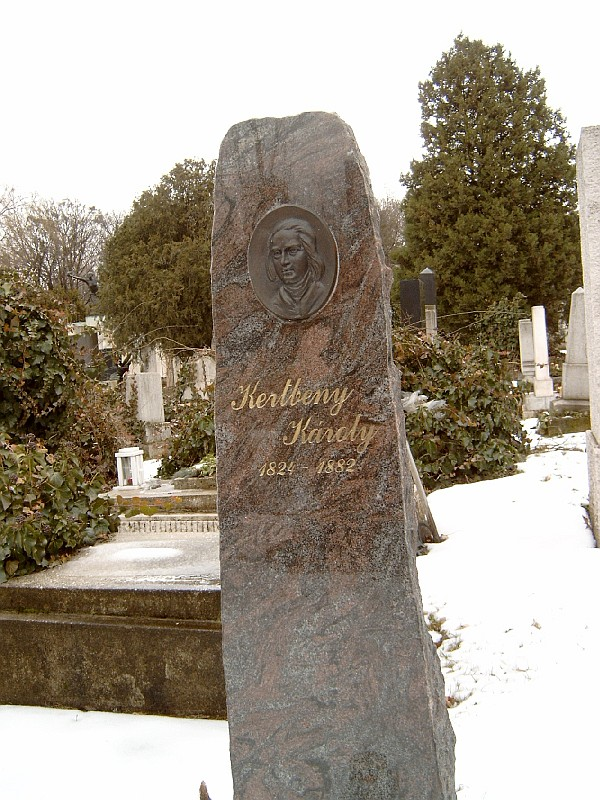
The grave of Károly Kertbeny in the cemetery on Kerepesi út in Budapest

Kertbeny died in Budapest on 23 January 1882 at the age of 58. József Komócsy (1836–1894) eulogized him: "He devoted his life to serving his country, even when he was living abroad. He publicised our glory there amongst foreign peoples. His first literary activities were received with mockery, but he did not give up and he brought light to Hungarian literature for foreign people".

The Hungarian writer and literary historian Lajos Hatvany has described him in these terms: "This moody, fluttering, imperfect writer is one of the best and undeservedly forgotten Hungarian memoir writers ... He was born effeminately sensitive, soft, believing, fair, open minded and enthusiastic for beauty. He loved to love, and loved to be loved. He loved only the beautiful and he wanted the love of the best. Mária! - An old, vain, swindling, naughty, clownish, thick skinned, envious, literary adventurer became of him: Károly, poor, Károly!"

Kertbeny's gravesite, which was identified in 2001, is located in Budapest's Kerepesi Cemetery, which is the final resting place of numerous prominent Hungarians of the 19th and 20th centuries. The gay community set a new tombstone on it, and since 2002, a wreath has been placed at his grave as part of Hungarian gay festivals.
