= Glärnisch =

Mountain in Switzerland

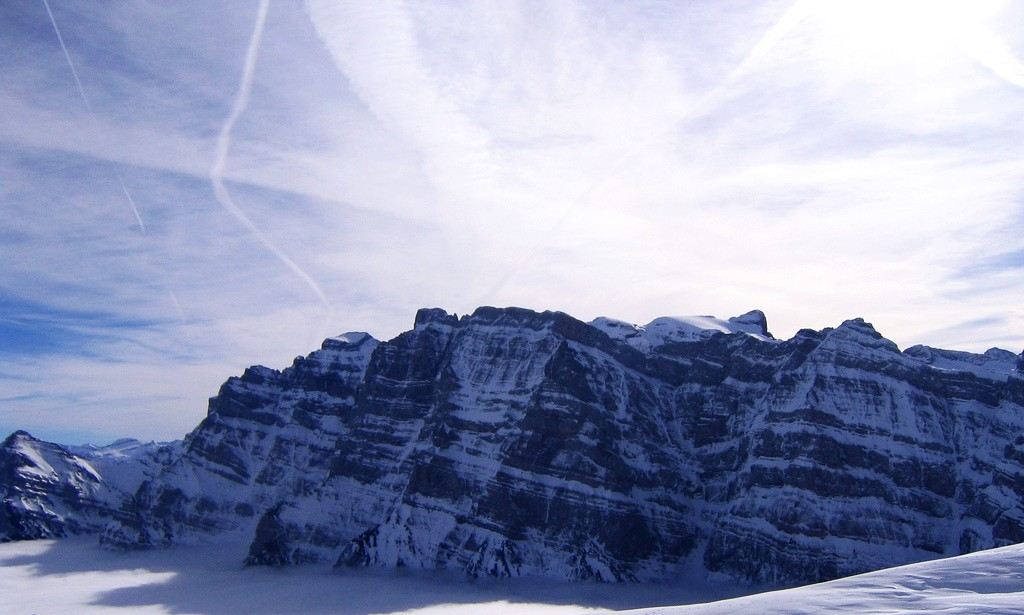

Highest point
- Peak: Bächistock
- Elevation: 2,915 m (9,564 ft)
- Prominence: 967 m (3,173 ft)
- Isolation: 14.3 km (8.9 mi)
- Coordinates: 46°59′55″N 8°59′55″E

Naming
- English translation: Like from Glarus
- Language of name: Swiss German

Geography
- Location within Switzerland Location within Canton of Glarus
- Country: Switzerland
- Canton: Glarus
- Parent range: Schwyz Alps
- Topo map: Swiss Federal Office of Topography swisstopo

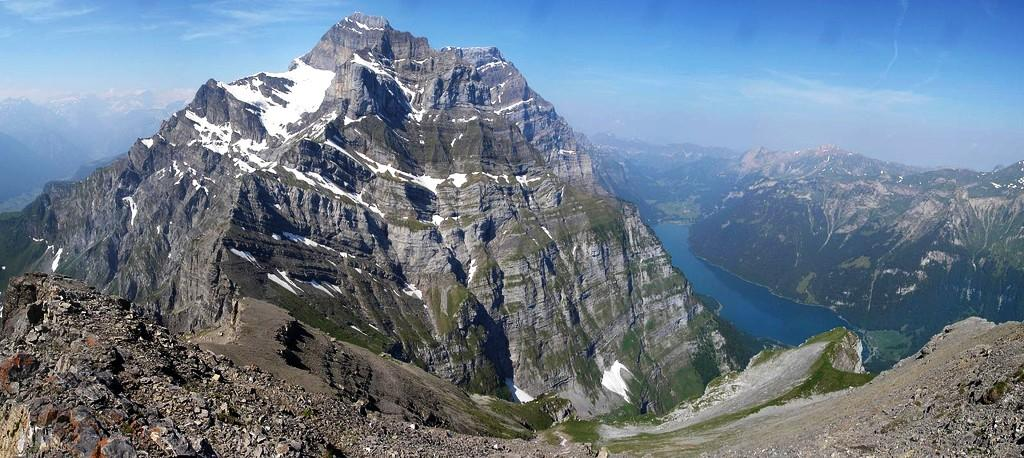
Glärnisch and Klöntalersee (from the Vorder Glärnisch)

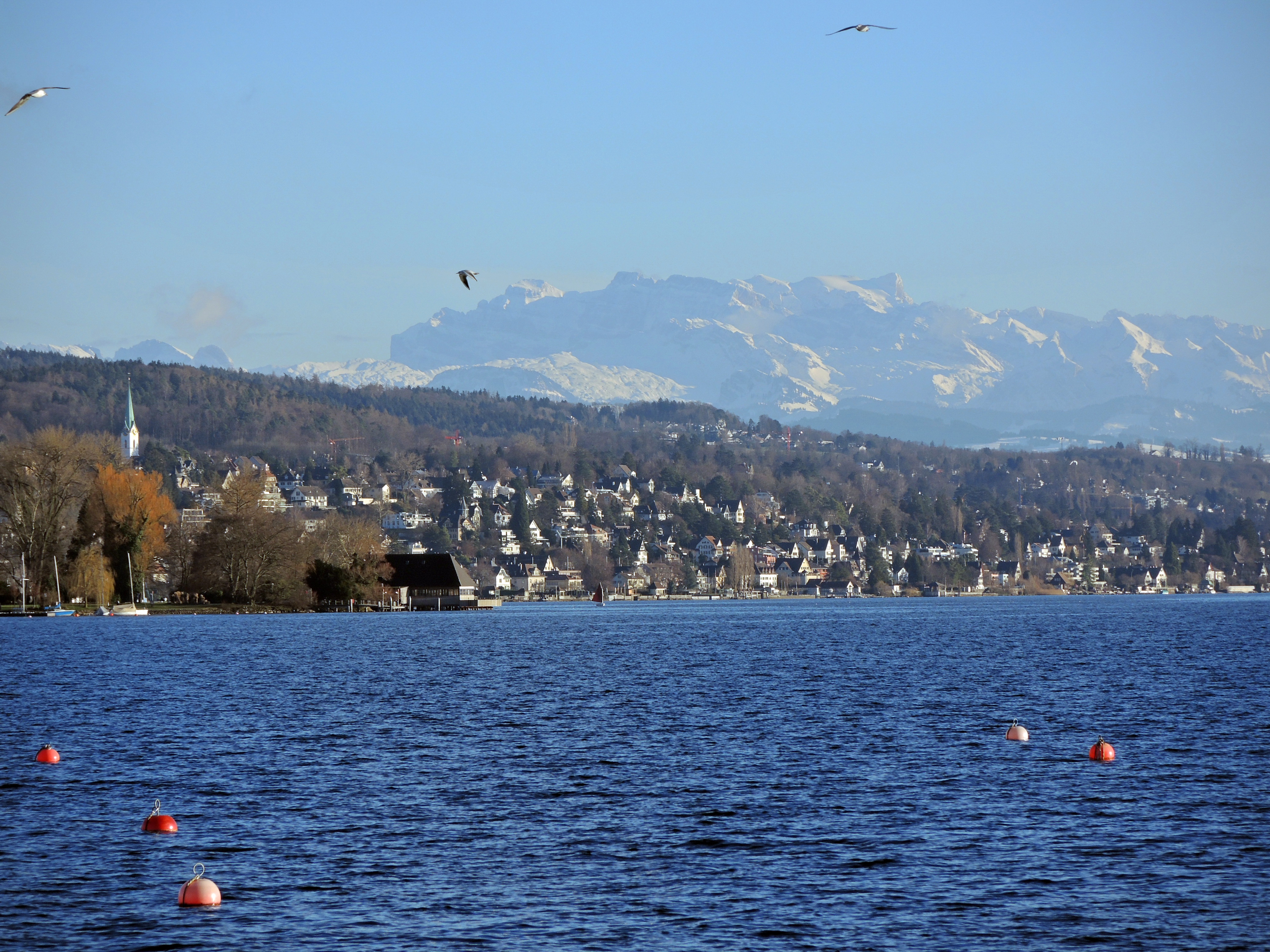
Glärnisch as seen from Zurich

The Glärnisch is a mountain massif of the Schwyz Alps, overlooking the valley of the Linth in the canton of Glarus, Switzerland. It consists of several summits, of which the highest, the Bächistock, is 2,915 metres (9,564 ft) above sea level. Until 2013, the highest point was considered to be an unnamed point with a summit cross at 2,914 m (9,560 ft) (until 2013: 2,915 metres). The other main summits are the Vrenelisgärtli (lit. 'Little Verena's Little Garden' at 2,904 m [9,528 ft]) and the Ruchen (2,901 m [9,518 ft]).

The massif of the Glärnisch consists of two ridges of either side of the firn named Glärnischfirn, culminating at the Ruchen to the west, rising more than 2,000 metres (6,600 ft) above the Klöntalersee, and at the Bächistock to the southwest. The Vrenelisgärtli is the closest peak to Schwanden. East of the Glärnisch is located the lower Vorder Glärnisch.

The Glärnisch is one of the higher mountains of the Alps visible from Zurich.

== Glärnischfirn ==
The Glärnischfirn (also known as the Glärnischgletscher, the "Glarnisch Glacier") is about 1.6 km (0.99 mi) long and 2.4 km (1.5 mi) wide. The surrounding peaks are generally accessible to hikers and climbers only by traversing the length of the glacier itself. From the Vrenelisgärtli peak, the Lake Klontal may be seen directly, more than 1.6 km (0.99 mi) below.

In recent years, the glacier has lost a massive amount of its volume and its tongue has retreated sharply.

== See also ==
- List of mountains of the canton of Glarus
- List of most isolated mountains of Switzerland
- North-Eastern Swiss Alps
