= Ennenda =

- Former municipality
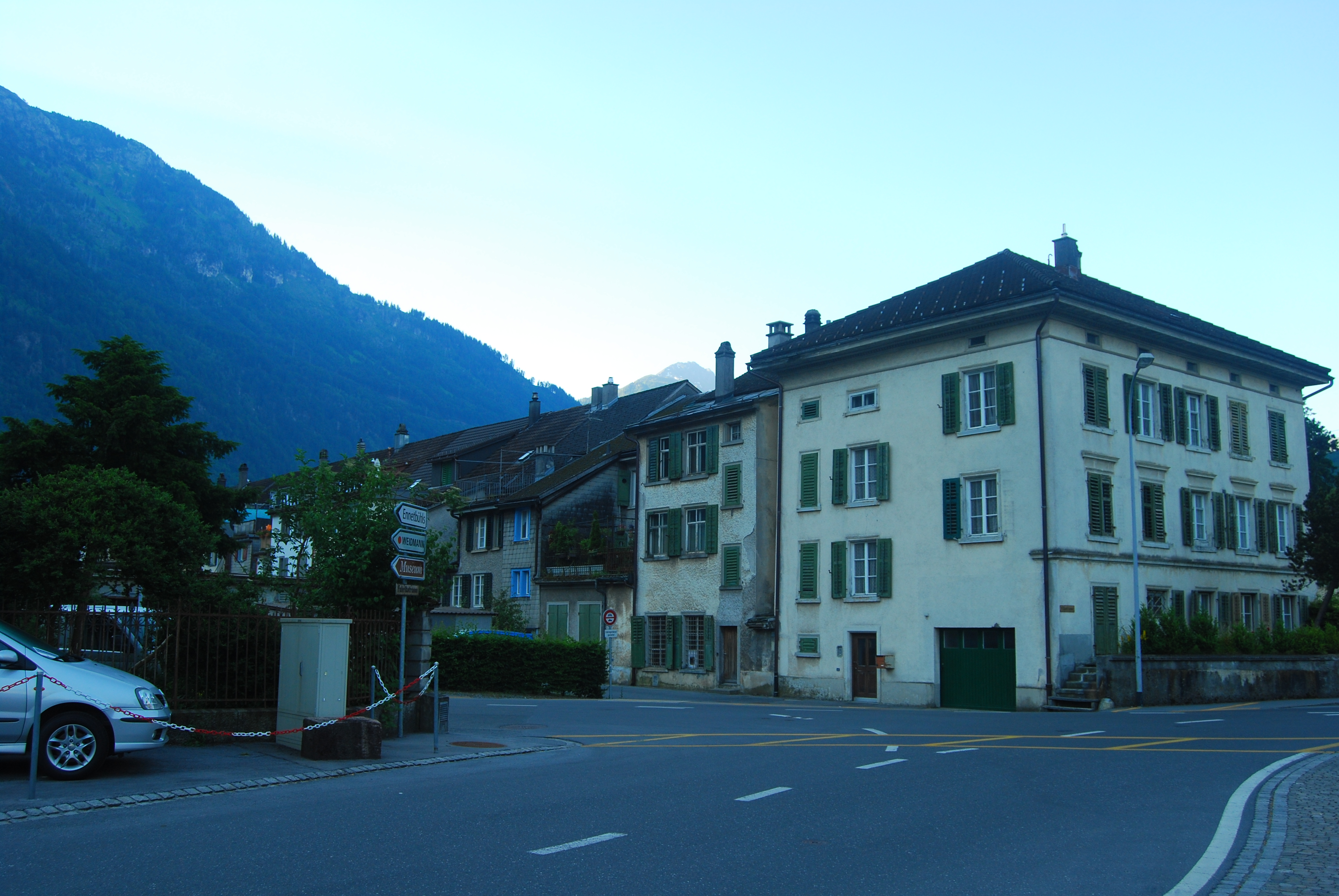

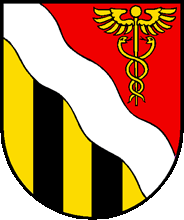
- Coat of arms
- Location of Ennenda
- Location within Switzerland Location within Canton of Glarus
- Coordinates: 47°02′N 9°05′E
- Country: Switzerland
- Canton: Glarus
- District: n.a.

Area
  - Total: 22.24 km^{2} (8.59 sq mi)
- Elevation: 478 m (1,568 ft)

Population (December 2020)
  - Total: 2,684
  - Density: 120.7/km^{2} (312.6/sq mi)
- Time zone: UTC+01:00 (CET)
  - Summer (DST): UTC+02:00 (CEST)
- Postal code: 8755
- SFOS number: 1607
- ISO 3166 code: CH-GL
- Surrounded by: Filzbach, Glarus, Mitlödi, Mollis, Netstal, Obstalden, Sool
- Website: www.ennenda.ch

Ennenda is a former municipality in the canton of Glarus in Switzerland. Effective from 1 January 2011, Ennenda is part of the municipality of Glarus.

== History ==
Ennenda is first mentioned around 1303-07 as Obront-Ennant-A and Nydern-Ennant-A.

During the 19th century, Ennenda became a busy manufacturing village in the local textile industry, and retains some attractive villas and housing from that period.

== Geography ==
Aerial view from 200 m by Walter Mittelholzer (1925)

Ennenda has an area, as of 2006, of 22.2 km^{2} (8.6 sq mi). Of this area, 35.5% is used for agricultural purposes, while 37.7% is forested. Of the rest of the land, 3.8% is settled (buildings or roads) and the remainder (23%) is non-productive (rivers, glaciers or mountains).

Ennenda is located on the right side of the Linth river, across from Glarus at the foot of the Schilt mountain. It consists of the village of Ennenda and the hamlets of Sturmigen, Ennetbühls and the mountain settlement of Ennetberge.

== Demographics ==
Ennenda had a population (as of 2010) of 2,684. As of 2007, 14.2% of the population was made up of foreign nationals. Over the last 10 years the population has decreased at a rate of -9.6%. Most of the population (as of 2000) speaks German (87.6%), with Italian being second most common ( 3.7%) and Albanian being third ( 2.8%).

In the 2007 federal election the most popular party was the SPS which received 58.8% of the vote. Most of the rest of the votes went to the SVP with 34.5% of the vote.

The entire Swiss population is generally well educated. In Ennenda about 67.5% of the population (between age 25-64) have completed either non-mandatory upper secondary education or additional higher education (either University or a Fachhochschule).

Ennenda has an unemployment rate of 1.6%. As of 2005, there were 80 people employed in the primary economic sector and about 34 businesses involved in this sector. 802 people are employed in the secondary sector and there are 33 businesses in this sector. 336 people are employed in the tertiary sector, with 51 businesses in this sector.

The historical population is given in the following table:

year	population
1554	204
1763	1,018
1850	2,313
1870	2,783
1900	2,494
1950	2,940
1960	3,076
2000	2,808

== Transport ==
Ennenda railway station is on the Weesen to Linthal railway line. It is served by the Zürich S-Bahn service S25 between Linthal and Zürich, and by the St. Gallen S-Bahn service S6 between Rapperswil and Schwanden.
