= Johann Jakob Blumer (politician) =

Swiss statesman (1819–1875)

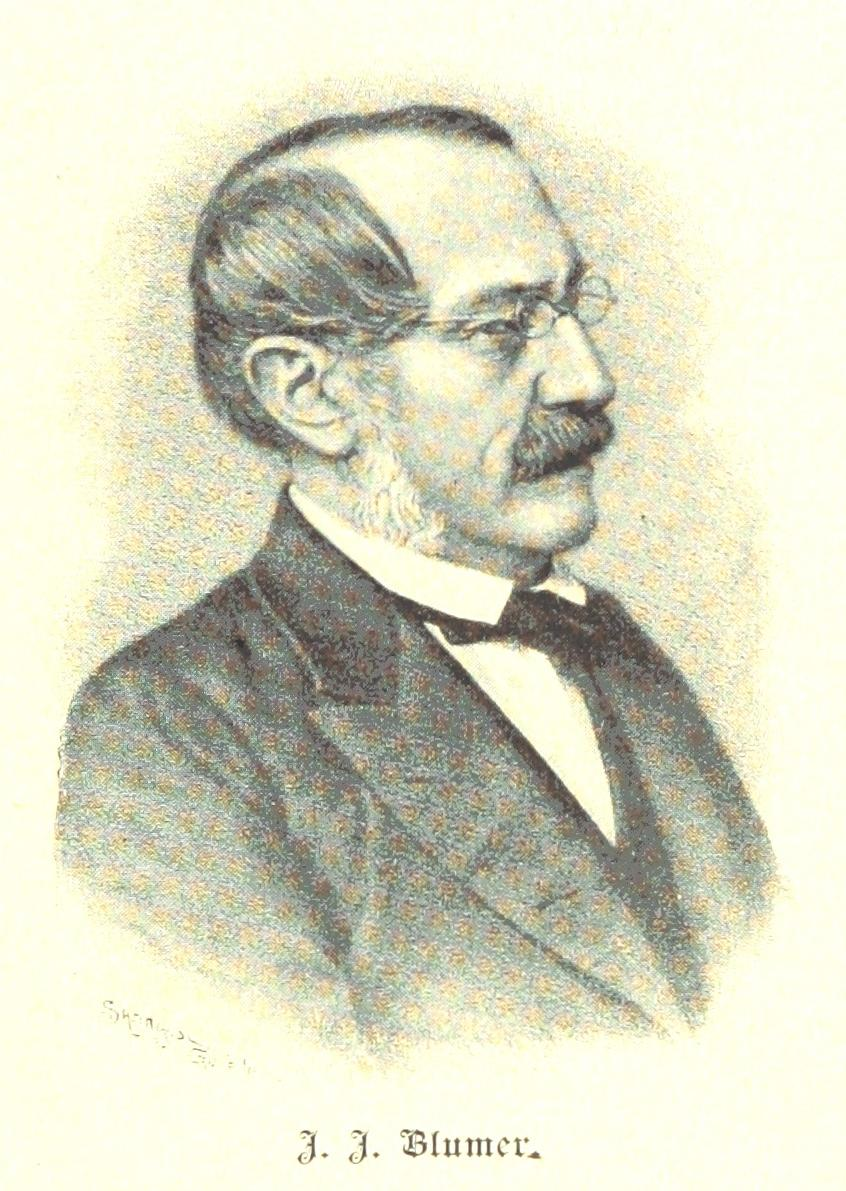
Johann Jakob Blumer.

Johann Jakob Blumer (29 August 1819 in Glarus – 12 November 1875) was a Swiss statesman.

Blumer studied in Zürich, Bonn, and Berlin. In 1843 he was elected to the Landrat, and in 1861 became president of the Court of Appeals. Between 1861 and 1874 he completed his revision of the civil and criminal law of Switzerland, and subsequently he was chosen as President of the Federal Supreme Court of Switzerland.

== Works ==
- Blumer, Johann Jakob (1850–1859). Staats- und Rechtsgeschichte der schweizerischen Demokratien oder der Kantone Uri, Schwyz, Unterwalden, Glarus, Zug und Appenzell: Das Mittelalter (in German). St. Gallen: Scheitlin und Zollikofer.
- Blumer, Johann Jakob (1877–1887) [First published 1863]. Handbuch des schweizerischen Bundesstaatsrechtes (in German). Schaffhausen: Fr. Hurter.

== Notes ==
Preceded by François Briatte	President of the Council of States; 1853/1854	Succeeded by James Fazy
Preceded by Emil Welti	President of the Council of States; 1860/1861	Succeeded by Nicolaus Hermann
Preceded by Christian Sahli	President of the Council of States; 1867/1868	Succeeded by Arnold Otto Aepli
