= Heinrich Hössli =

Swiss hatter and author

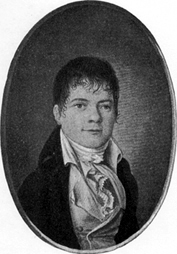
Heinrich Hössli

Heinrich Hössli (6 August 1784 – 24 December 1864), sometimes written as Hößli, was a Swiss hatter and author. His book Eros. Die Männerliebe der Griechen ('Eros. The Greeks' love of men'; 2 vols., 1836, 1838) surveyed references to same-sex love in ancient Greek literature and more recent research, and was one of the first works in the 19th century that defended love between men.

== Biography ==
Hössli was born on 6 August 1784 in Glarus in Switzerland, the oldest of 14 children, to hatter Hans Jakob Hössli (1758–1846) and Margreth Vogel (1757–1831). He learned his father's occupation in Bern.

Back in Glarus he worked as hatter and also started a business in trading women's clothing. His hats for women were famous in the region.

In 1811 he married Elisabeth Grebel, and had two sons, who emigrated to the United States. For most of his marriage his wife and sons lived in Zurich while he himself lived in Glarus.

He died on 24 December 1864.

== Works by Hössli ==
- Eros, Die Männerliebe der Griechen, ihre Beziehungen zur Geschichte, Erziehung, Literatur und Gesetzgebung aller Zeiten (vol. 1: Glarus 1836; vol. 2: Sankt Gallen 1838), reprint Berlin, Verlag rosa Winkel, 1998, vol. 1: ISBN 3-86149-056-0, vol. 2: ISBN 3-86149-057-9
- New vol. 3: Documents by Heinrich Hössli with an introduction by Manfred Herzer, a short biography by Ferdinand Karsch-Haack, and a reprint of the novella Der Eros (1821) by Heinrich Zschokke, ISBN 3-86149-058-7
- Hexenprozeß- und Glauben, Pfaffen und Teufel. Leipzig, 1892, 80 pages

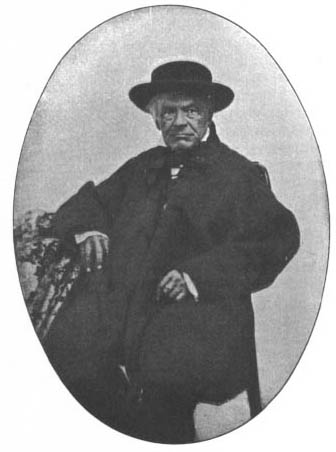
Heinrich Hössli in later years
