= Alpine skiing at the 1984 Winter Olympics – Men's giant slalom =

Men's giant slalom at the XIV Olympic Winter Games
- Alpine skiing
- Venue: Bjelašnica
- Date: February 14, 1984
- Competitors: 108 from 39 nations
- Winning time: 2:41.18

Medalists
1st place, gold medalist(s)		Max Julen	Switzerland
2nd place, silver medalist(s)		Jure Franko	Yugoslavia
3rd place, bronze medalist(s)		Andreas Wenzel	Liechtenstein

The Men's giant slalom competition of the Sarajevo 1984 Olympics was held at Bjelašnica.

The defending world champion was Steve Mahre of the United States, while his brother, Phil Mahre, was the defending World Cup giant slalom champion, and Switzerland's Pirmin Zurbriggen was the leader of the 1984 World Cup.

== Results ==
Rank	Name	Country	Run 1	Run 2	Total	Difference
1st place, gold medalist(s)	Max Julen	Switzerland	1:20.54	1:20.64	2:41.18	-
2nd place, silver medalist(s)	Jure Franko	Yugoslavia	1:21.15	1:20.26	2:41.41	+0.23
3rd place, bronze medalist(s)	Andreas Wenzel	Liechtenstein	1:20.64	1:21.11	2:41.75	+0.57
4	Franz Gruber	Austria	1:21.03	1:21.05	2:42.08	+0.90
5	Boris Strel	Yugoslavia	1:21.23	1:21.13	2:42.36	+1.18
6	Hubert Strolz	Austria	1:21.47	1:21.24	2:42.71	+1.53
7	Alex Giorgi	Italy	1:22.05	1:20.95	2:43.00	+1.82
8	Phil Mahre	United States	1:22.09	1:21.16	2:43.25	+2.07
9	Bojan Križaj	Yugoslavia	1:22.18	1:21.30	2:43.48	+2.30
10	Joël Gaspoz	Switzerland	1:21.98	1:21.62	2:43.60	+2.42
11	Thomas Bürgler	Switzerland	1:21.75	1:22.09	2:43.84	+2.66
12	Roberto Erlacher	Italy	1:22.36	1:21.73	2:44.09	+2.91
13	Egon Hirt	West Germany	1:22.45	1:21.66	2:44.11	+2.93
14	Didier Bouvet	France	1:22.16	1:22.09	2:44.25	+3.07
15	Oswald Tötsch	Italy	1:22.94	1:22.03	2:44.97	+3.79
16	Yves Tavernier	France	1:23.32	1:22.05	2:45.37	+4.19
17	Steve Mahre	United States	1:23.43	1:22.60	2:46.03	+4.85
18	Niklas Henning	Sweden	1:23.61	1:22.51	2:46.12	+4.94
19	Odd Sørli	Norway	1:22.90	1:23.49	2:46.39	+5.21
20	Jorge Pérez	Spain	1:23.64	1:24.33	2:47.97	+6.79
21	Petar Popangelov	Bulgaria	1:24.83	1:23.61	2:48.44	+7.26
22	Gunnar Neuriesser	Sweden	1:23.99	1:24.46	2:48.45	+7.27
23	Günther Marxer	Liechtenstein	1:24.78	1:24.01	2:48.79	+7.61
24	Jim Read	Canada	1:24.31	1:24.87	2:49.18	+8.00
25	Naomine Iwaya	Japan	1:25.02	1:24.67	2:49.69	+8.51
26	Toshihiro Kaiwa	Japan	1:24.92	1:25.05	2:49.97	+8.79
27	Osamu Kodama	Japan	1:24.81	1:25.40	2:50.21	+9.03
28	Valentin Gichev	Bulgaria	1:26.12	1:26.52	2:52.64	+11.46
29	Markus Hubrich	New Zealand	1:25.81	1:26.98	2:52.79	+11.61
30	Shinya Chiba	Japan	1:25.67	1:27.51	2:53.18	+12.00
31	Mitko Khadzhiev	Bulgaria	1:27.50	1:26.84	2:54.34	+13.16
32	Martin Bell	Great Britain	1:28.42	1:28.08	2:56.50	+15.32
33	David Mercer	Great Britain	1:27.81	1:28.83	2:56.64	+15.46
34	Scott Alan Sánchez	Bolivia	1:29.45	1:27.84	2:57.29	+16.11
35	Pierre Couquelet	Belgium	1:28.71	1:29.88	2:58.59	+17.41
36	Simon Wi Rutene	New Zealand	1:30.13	1:28.97	2:59.10	+17.92
37	Andres Figueroa	Chile	1:29.86	1:29.37	2:59.23	+18.05
38	Nicholas Wilson	Great Britain	1:29.26	1:30.23	2:59.49	+18.31
39	Frederick Burton	Great Britain	1:30.32	1:30.23	3:00.55	+19.37
40	Árni Þór Árnason	Iceland	1:30.05	1:31.21	3:01.26	+20.08
41	Zolt Balazs	Romania	1:31.00	1:31.41	3:02.41	+21.23
42	Dieter Linneberg	Chile	1:31.75	1:31.81	3:03.56	+22.38
43	Guðmundur Jóhannsson	Iceland	1:30.90	1:33.51	3:04.41	+23.23
44	Miguel Purcell	Chile	1:32.19	1:33.21	3:05.40	+24.22
45	Mihai Bîră Jr.	Romania	1:32.04	1:34.45	3:06.49	+25.31
46	Jorge Birkner	Argentina	1:33.82	1:34.18	3:08.00	+26.82
47	Fernando Enevoldsen	Argentina	1:33.82	1:34.45	3:08.27	+27.09
48	Hubertus von Fürstenberg-von Hohenlohe	Mexico	1:34.82	1:35.27	3:10.09	+28.91
49	Lazaros Arkhontopoulos	Greece	1:35.36	1:35.65	3:11.01	+29.83
50	Ioannis Triantafyllidis	Greece	1:38.20	1:40.74	3:18.94	+37.76
51	Andreas Pantelidis	Greece	1:39.57	1:39.87	3:19.44	+38.26
52	Enrique de Ridder	Argentina	1:38.49	1:41.33	3:19.82	+38.64
53	Yakup Kadri Birinci	Turkey	1:42.39	1:42.24	3:24.63	+43.45
54	Li Guangquan	China	1:42.16	1:42.83	3:24.99	+43.81
55	Giannis Stamatiou	Greece	1:44.21	1:40.97	3:25.18	+44.00
56	Liu Changcheng	China	1:41.76	1:46.75	3:28.51	+47.33
57	Lamine Guèye	Senegal	1:42.63	1:46.04	3:28.67	+47.49
58	Tony Sukkar	Lebanon	1:43.48	1:45.50	3:28.98	+47.80
59	Wu Deqiang	China	1:41.74	1:48.66	3:30.40	+49.22
60	Ali Fuad Haşıl	Turkey	1:44.76	1:47.08	3:31.84	+50.66
61	Sabahattin Hamamcıoğlu	Turkey	1:44.84	1:48.74	3:33.58	+52.40
62	Sotirios Axiotiades	Lebanon	1:46.67	1:53.95	3:40.62	+59.44
63	Erkan Mermut	Turkey	1:48.58	1:53.35	3:41.93	+60.75
64	Ahmad Ouachit	Morocco	1:45.17	1:56.94	3:42.11	+60.93
65	Eduardo Kopper	Costa Rica	1:49.35	1:57.23	3:46.58	+65.40
66	Nabil Khalil	Lebanon	1:48.38	1:59.31	3:47.69	+66.51
67	Arturo Kinch	Costa Rica	1:57.84	1:53.27	3:51.11	+69.93
68	Ong Ching-ming	Chinese Taipei	1:53.03	1:58.94	3:51.97	+70.79
69	Alekhis Fotiadis	Cyprus	1:52.98	2:01.05	3:54.03	+72.85
70	Lambros Lambrou	Cyprus	1:56.46	1:59.51	3:55.97	+74.79
71	Lin Chi-liang	Chinese Taipei	1:52.78	2:03.86	3:56.64	+75.46
72	Edward Samen	Lebanon	1:52.51	2:05.34	3:57.85	+76.67
73	Ahmed Ait Moulay	Morocco	1:54.54	2:03.41	3:57.95	+76.77
74	Hamid Oujebbad	Morocco	1:58.13	2:08.56	4:06.69	+85.51
75	Giannos Pipis	Cyprus	1:56.18	2:11.55	4:07.73	+86.55
76	José-Manuel Bejarano	Bolivia	2:04.38	2:29.58	4:33.96	+112.78
-	Vladimir Andreyev	Soviet Union	1:24.53	DNF	-	-
-	Steven Lee	Australia	1:28.76	DQ	-	-
-	Kim Jin-Hae	South Korea	1:40.34	DQ	-	-
-	Francesco Cardelli	San Marino	1:49.00	DNF	-	-
-	Brahim Ait Sibrahim	Morocco	1:56.32	DNF	-	-
-	Pavlos Fotiadis	Cyprus	DNF	-	-	-
-	Jamil El-Reedy	Egypt	DNF	-	-	-
-	Christian Bollini	San Marino	DNF	-	-	-
-	Nicolas van Ditmar	Argentina	DNF	-	-	-
-	Jordi Torres	Andorra	DNF	-	-	-
-	Albert Llovera	Andorra	DNF	-	-	-
-	Henri Mollin	Belgium	DNF	-	-	-
-	Hans Kossmann	Chile	DNF	-	-	-
-	Alberto Ghidoni	Italy	DNF	-	-	-
-	Borislav Kiryakov	Bulgaria	DNF	-	-	-
-	Hubert Hilti	Liechtenstein	DNF	-	-	-
-	Luis Fernández Ochoa	Spain	DNF	-	-	-
-	Michel Vion	France	DNF	-	-	-
-	Mario Konzett	Liechtenstein	DNF	-	-	-
-	Péter Kozma	Hungary	DNF	-	-	-
-	Anton Steiner	Austria	DNF	-	-	-
-	Franck Piccard	France	DNF	-	-	-
-	Tiger Shaw	United States	DNF	-	-	-
-	Johan Wallner	Sweden	DNF	-	-	-
-	Jörgen Sundqvist	Sweden	DNF	-	-	-
-	Pirmin Zurbriggen	Switzerland	DNF	-	-	-
-	Hans Enn	Austria	DNF	-	-	-
-	Grega Benedik	Yugoslavia	DNF	-	-	-
-	Mario Hada	Bolivia	DQ	-	-	-
-	Carlos Salvadores	Spain	DQ	-	-	-
-	Park Byung-Ro	South Korea	DQ	-	-	-
-	Eu Woo-Youn	South Korea	DQ	-	-	-
