= Alpine skiing at the 1984 Winter Olympics – Men's slalom =

Men's slalom at the XIV Olympic Winter Games
- Alpine skiing
- Venue: Bjelašnica
- Date: February 19, 1984
- Competitors: 101 from 38 nations
- Winning time: 1:39.41

Medalists
1st place, gold medalist(s)		Phil Mahre	United States
2nd place, silver medalist(s)		Steve Mahre	United States
3rd place, bronze medalist(s)		Didier Bouvet	France

The Men's slalom competition of the Sarajevo 1984 Olympics was held at Bjelašnica.

The defending world champion was Ingemar Stenmark of Sweden, who was also the defending World Cup slalom champion and the leader of the 1984 World Cup.

== Results ==
Rank	Name	Country	Run 1	Run 2	Total	Difference
1st place, gold medalist(s)	Phil Mahre	United States	0:51.55	0:47.86	1:39.41	-
2nd place, silver medalist(s)	Steve Mahre	United States	0:50.85	0:48.77	1:39.62	+0.21
3rd place, bronze medalist(s)	Didier Bouvet	France	0:51.99	0:48.21	1:40.20	+0.79
4	Jonas Nilsson	Sweden	0:51.52	0:48.73	1:40.25	+0.84
5	Oswald Tötsch	Italy	0:52.81	0:47.67	1:40.48	+1.07
6	Petar Popangelov	Bulgaria	0:52.40	0:48.28	1:40.68	+1.27
7	Bojan Križaj	Yugoslavia	0:52.98	0:48.53	1:41.51	+2.10
8	Lars-Göran Halvarsson	Sweden	0:52.97	0:48.73	1:41.70	+2.29
9	Stig Strand	Sweden	0:52.95	0:49.00	1:41.95	+2.54
10	Thomas Bürgler	Switzerland	0:53.16	0:48.87	1:42.03	+2.62
11	Tomaž Cerkovnik	Yugoslavia	0:53.39	0:49.58	1:42.97	+3.56
12	Toshihiro Kaiwa	Japan	0:53.61	0:50.26	1:43.87	+4.46
13	Jože Kuralt	Yugoslavia	0:53.52	0:51.33	1:44.85	+5.44
14	Markus Hubrich	New Zealand	0:56.75	0:52.78	1:49.53	+10.12
15	Borislav Kiryakov	Bulgaria	0:57.00	0:53.24	1:50.24	+10.83
16	Nicholas Wilson	Great Britain	0:57.33	0:54.75	1:52.08	+12.67
17	Matthias Hubrich	New Zealand	0:58.63	0:55.73	1:54.36	+14.95
18	Péter Kozma	Hungary	0:59.14	0:55.24	1:54.38	+14.97
19	Andres Figueroa	Chile	0:59.79	0:55.59	1:55.38	+15.97
20	Dieter Linneberg	Chile	0:59.86	0:55.92	1:55.78	+16.37
21	Hans Kossmann	Chile	1:00.15	0:56.12	1:56.27	+16.86
22	Jorge Birkner	Argentina	1:00.85	0:55.70	1:56.55	+17.14
23	Miguel Purcell	Chile	1:02.26	0:55.74	1:58.00	+18.59
24	Nicolas van Ditmar	Argentina	1:02.30	0:58.18	2:00.48	+21.07
25	Lazaros Arkhontopoulos	Greece	1:04.16	0:59.80	2:03.96	+24.55
26	Hubertus von Fürstenberg-von Hohenlohe	Mexico	1:04.42	1:03.75	2:08.17	+28.76
27	Yakup Kadri Birinci	Turkey	1:07.53	1:06.33	2:13.86	+34.45
28	Ioannis Triantafyllidis	Greece	1:09.21	1:04.68	2:13.89	+34.48
29	Wu Deqiang	China	1:07.62	1:06.39	2:14.01	+34.60
30	Li Guangquan	China	1:09.12	1:07.47	2:16.59	+37.18
31	Kim Jin-Hae	South Korea	1:09.42	1:08.03	2:17.45	+38.04
32	Ali Fuad Haşłl	Turkey	1:09.65	1:07.93	2:17.58	+38.17
33	Liu Changcheng	China	1:09.87	1:08.88	2:18.75	+39.34
34	Erkan Mermut	Turkey	1:09.29	1:09.73	2:19.02	+39.61
35	Eu Woo-Youn	South Korea	1:11.28	1:10.17	2:21.45	+42.04
36	Ong Ching-Ming	Chinese Taipei	1:10.33	1:12.30	2:22.63	+43.22
37	Sabahattin Hamamcłoğlu	Turkey	1:14.56	1:08.79	2:23.35	+43.94
38	Ahmad Ouachit	Morocco	1:13.04	1:10.34	2:23.38	+43.97
39	Nabil Khalil	Lebanon	1:14.54	1:13.73	2:28.27	+48.86
40	Francesco Cardelli	San Marino	1:17.67	1:16.06	2:33.73	+54.32
41	Lambros Lambrou	Cyprus	1:17.27	1:17.35	2:34.62	+55.21
42	Edward Samen	Lebanon	1:19.93	1:19.16	2:39.09	+59.68
43	Christian Bollini	San Marino	1:23.50	1:16.54	2:40.04	+60.63
44	Ahmed Ait Moulay	Morocco	1:24.80	1:18.45	2:43.25	+63.84
45	Eduardo Kopper	Costa Rica	1:24.39	1:18.94	2:43.33	+63.92
46	Jamil El-Reedy	Egypt	1:30.56	1:26.37	2:56.93	+77.52
47	Giannos Pipis	Cyprus	1:30.69	1:30.83	3:01.52	+82.11
-	Alex Giorgi	Italy	0:51.96	DNF	-	-
-	Roberto Grigis	Italy	0:53.19	DNF	-	-
-	Jorge Pérez	Spain	0:53.25	DQ	-	-
-	Bengt Fjällberg	Sweden	0:53.31	DQ	-	-
-	Osamu Kodama	Japan	0:53.42	DQ	-	-
-	Tiger Shaw	United States	0:53.45	DNF	-	-
-	Florian Beck	West Germany	0:53.49	DNF	-	-
-	Vladimir Andreyev	Soviet Union	0:54.01	DNF	-	-
-	Hans Enn	Austria	0:54.05	DNF	-	-
-	Valentin Gichev	Bulgaria	0:54.32	DQ	-	-
-	Luis Fernández Ochoa	Spain	0:55.28	DNF	-	-
-	Árni Þór Árnason	Iceland	0:57.71	DNF	-	-
-	Zolt Balazs	Romania	0:59.01	DQ	-	-
-	Henri Mollin	Belgium	1:00.07	DNF	-	-
-	Scott Alan Sánchez	Bolivia	1:00.16	DNF	-	-
-	Américo Astete	Argentina	1:04.90	DNF	-	-
-	Giannis Stamatiou	Greece	1:06.82	DQ	-	-
-	Sotirios Axiotiades	Lebanon	1:15.54	DNF	-	-
-	Brahim Ait Sibrahim	Morocco	1:18.90	DNF	-	-
-	Alekhis Fotiadis	Cyprus	DNF	-	-	-
-	Lin Chi-Liang	Chinese Taipei	DNF	-	-	-
-	Park Byung-Ro	South Korea	DNF	-	-	-
-	Tony Sukkar	Lebanon	DNF	-	-	-
-	Albert Llovera	Andorra	DNF	-	-	-
-	David Lajoux	Monaco	DNF	-	-	-
-	Jordi Torres	Andorra	DNF	-	-	-
-	Mihai Bîră, Jr.	Romania	DNF	-	-	-
-	Pierre Couquelet	Belgium	DNF	-	-	-
-	Guðmundur Jóhannsson	Iceland	DNF	-	-	-
-	Günther Marxer	Liechtenstein	DNF	-	-	-
-	David Mercer	Great Britain	DNF	-	-	-
-	Mario Konzett	Liechtenstein	DNF	-	-	-
-	Egon Hirt	West Germany	DNF	-	-	-
-	Carlos Salvadores	Spain	DNF	-	-	-
-	Mitko Khadzhiev	Bulgaria	DNF	-	-	-
-	Michael Tommy	Canada	DNF	-	-	-
-	Jure Franko	Yugoslavia	DNF	-	-	-
-	Hubert Strolz	Austria	DNF	-	-	-
-	Yves Tavernier	France	DNF	-	-	-
-	Naomine Iwaya	Japan	DNF	-	-	-
-	Odd Sørli	Norway	DNF	-	-	-
-	Joël Gaspoz	Switzerland	DNF	-	-	-
-	Pirmin Zurbriggen	Switzerland	DNF	-	-	-
-	Andreas Wenzel	Liechtenstein	DNF	-	-	-
-	Max Julen	Switzerland	DNF	-	-	-
-	Michel Canac	France	DNF	-	-	-
-	Paolo De Chiesa	Italy	DNF	-	-	-
-	Pavlos Fotiadis	Cyprus	DQ	-	-	-
-	Andreas Pantelidis	Greece	DQ	-	-	-
-	Fernando Enevoldsen	Argentina	DQ	-	-	-
-	Michel Vion	France	DQ	-	-	-
-	Paul Frommelt	Liechtenstein	DQ	-	-	-
-	Franz Gruber	Austria	DQ	-	-	-
-	Anton Steiner	Austria	DQ	-	-	-
