= Alpine skiing at the 1984 Winter Olympics – Men's downhill =

Men's downhill at the XIV Olympic Winter Games
- Alpine skiing
- Venue: Bjelašnica, Yugoslavia
- Date: February 16, 1984
- Competitors: 61 from 25 nations
- Winning time: 1:45.59

Medalists
1st place, gold medalist(s)		Bill Johnson	United States
2nd place, silver medalist(s)		Peter Müller	Switzerland
3rd place, bronze medalist(s)		Anton Steiner	Austria

Men's Downhill
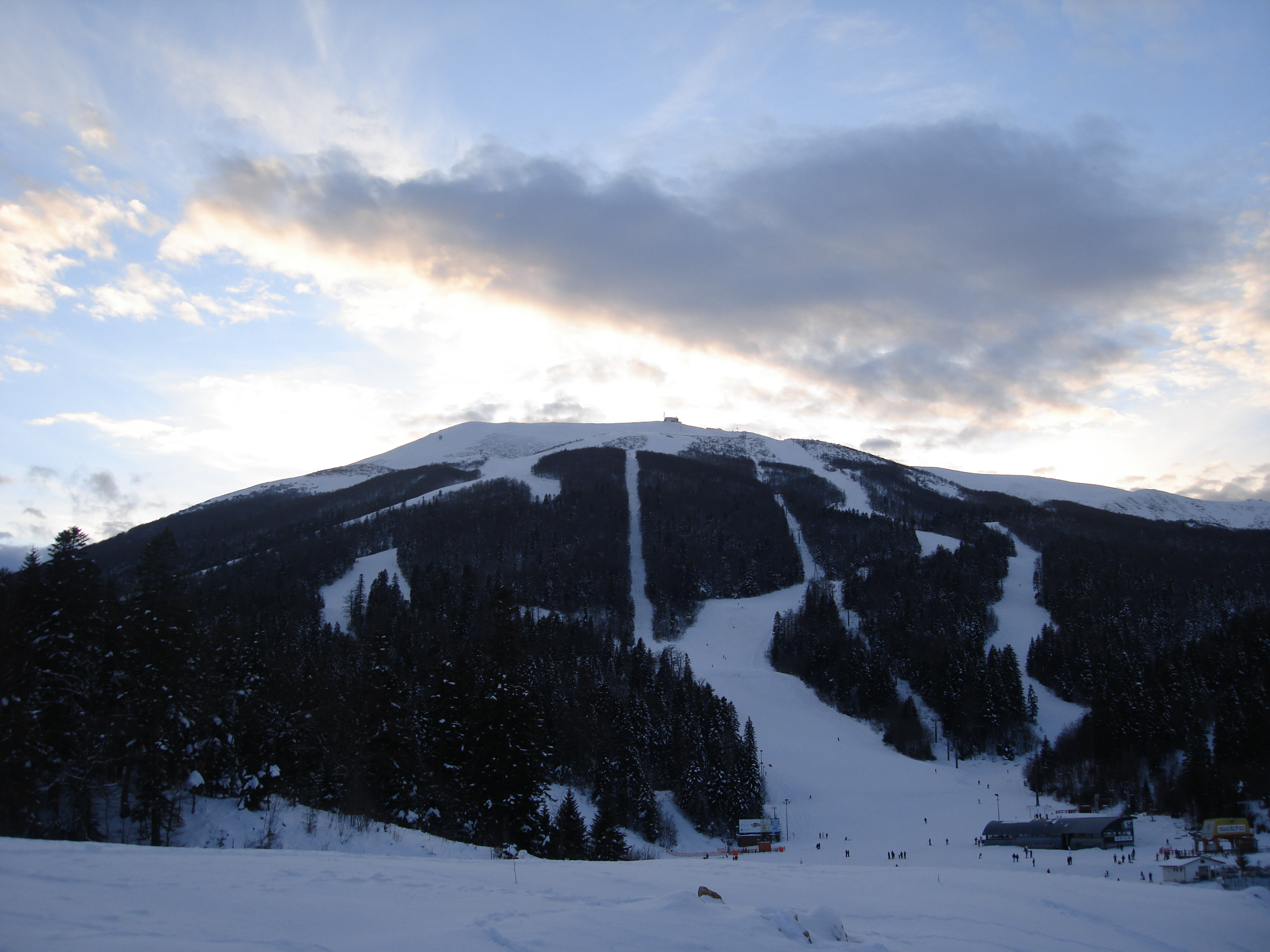
- Location: Bjelašnica, Yugoslavia; Olympia course
- Vertical: 803 m (2,635 ft)
- Top elevation: 2,076 m (6,811 ft)
- Base elevation: 1,273 m (4,177 ft)

The Men's downhill competition of the 1984 Winter Olympics was held at Bjelašnica, Yugoslavia. Due to weather delays, it was run on Thursday, February 16, a full week after originally scheduled.

The reigning world champion was Harti Weirather of Austria, while teammate Franz Klammer was the reigning World Cup downhill champion and Switzerland's Urs Räber led the current season. Similar to 1980, the defending Olympic downhill champion was from Austria and did not compete; Leonhard Stock was injured a month earlier in early January.

In order to meet the minimum vertical drop requirement of 800 meters (2,625 feet), the starting gate was in a newly constructed summit lodge and restaurant, with a connecting ramp to the mountain proper.

Bill Johnson of the United States became the first from outside the Alps to win an Olympic downhill. In his first full World Cup season, he was a top "glider" and made up time on the flatter lower third of the course. The previous best finishes for an American man in an Olympic downhill was fifth (1952, 1980), and sixth (1976); American women had won three medals (1960, 1972, 1976), but never a gold.

The course started at an elevation of 2,076 m (6,811 ft) above sea level with a vertical drop of 803 m (2,635 ft) and a length of 3.066 km (1.91 mi). Johnson's winning time was 105.59 seconds, yielding an average speed of 104.533 km/h (65.0 mph), with an average vertical descent rate of 7.605 m/s (25.0 ft/s).

== Results ==
The race was started at 12:00 local time, (UTC+1). At the starting gate, the skies were clear, the temperature was −9.8 °C (14.4 °F), and the snow condition was "good."

Rank	Bib	Name	Country	Time	Difference
1st place, gold medalist(s)	6	Bill Johnson	United States	1:45.59	–
2nd place, silver medalist(s)	11	Peter Müller	Switzerland	1:45.86	+0.27
3rd place, bronze medalist(s)	13	Anton Steiner	Austria	1:45.95	+0.36
4	2	Pirmin Zurbriggen	Switzerland	1:46.05	+0.46
5	9	Urs Räber	Switzerland	1:46.32	+0.73
5	7	Helmut Höflehner	Austria	1:46.32	+0.73
7	14	Sepp Wildgruber	West Germany	1:46.53	+0.94
8	12	Steve Podborski	Canada	1:46.59	+1.00
9	15	Todd Brooker	Canada	1:46.64	+1.05
10	3	Franz Klammer	Austria	1:47.04	+1.45
11	10	Erwin Resch	Austria	1:47.06	+1.47
12	21	Klaus Gattermann	West Germany	1:47.12	+1.53
13	25	Günther Marxer	Liechtenstein	1:47.43	+1.84
14	5	Conradin Cathomen	Switzerland	1:47.63	+2.04
15	4	Michael Mair	Italy	1:47.70	+2.11
16	18	Vladimir Makeev	Soviet Union	1:47.87	+2.28
16	16	Alberto Ghidoni	Italy	1:47.87	+2.28
18	26	Martin Bell	Great Britain	1:48.00	+2.41
19	8	Steven Lee	Australia	1:48.02	+2.43
20	27	Franck Piccard	France	1:48.06	+2.47
20	19	Danilo Sbardellotto	Italy	1:48.06	+2.47
22	24	Herbert Renoth	West Germany	1:48.39	+2.80
23	20	Valeri Tsyganov	Soviet Union	1:48.46	+2.87
24	22	Doug Lewis	United States	1:48.49	+2.90
25	31	Michel Vion	France	1:48.68	+3.09
26	1	Gary Athans	Canada	1:48.79	+3.20
27	30	Janez Pleteršek	Yugoslavia	1:48.97	+3.38
28	28	Shinya Chiba	Japan	1:49.02	+3.43
29	23	Philippe Verneret	France	1:49.30	+3.71
30	32	Tomaž Jemc	Yugoslavia	1:49.68	+4.09
31	38	Bruce Grant	New Zealand	1:49.94	+4.35
32	29	Graham Bell	Great Britain	1:50.06	+4.47
33	34	Connor O'Brien	Great Britain	1:50.36	+4.77
34	35	Alistair Guss	Australia	1:50.57	+4.98
35	37	Markus Hubrich	New Zealand	1:50.77	+5.18
36	36	Hubert Hilti	Liechtenstein	1:50.94	+5.35
37	33	Frederick Burton	Great Britain	1:51.15	+5.56
38	41	Hubertus von Fürstenberg	Mexico	1:51.57	+5.98
39	43	Dieter Linneberg	Chile	1:51.68	+6.09
40	40	Pierre Couquelet	Belgium	1:52.40	+6.81
41	42	Andres Figueroa	Chile	1:52.97	+7.38
42	44	Hans Kossmann	Chile	1:54.36	+8.77
43	45	Scott Alan Sánchez	Bolivia	1:54.75	+9.16
44	48	Miguel Purcell	Chile	1:54.91	+9.32
45	46	Jorge Birkner	Argentina	1:54.92	+9.33
46	39	Henri Mollin	Belgium	1:55.72	+10.13
47	50	David Lajoux	Monaco	1:56.95	+11.36
48	57	Albert Llovera	Andorra	1:57.88	+12.29
49	47	Nicolas van Ditmar	Argentina	1:58.86	+13.27
50	56	Jordi Torres	Andorra	1:59.06	+13.47
51	49	Lamine Guèye	Senegal	1:59.64	+14.05
52	60	Park Byung-ro	South Korea	1:59.74	+14.15
53	52	Enrique de Ridder	Argentina	1:59.76	+14.17
54	51	Américo Astete	Argentina	2:01.60	+16.01
55	58	Giannis Stamatiou	Greece	2:01.79	+16.20
56	53	Andreas Pantelidis	Greece	2:01.88	+16.29
57	59	Kim Jin-hae	South Korea	2:01.96	+16.37
58	54	Eu Woo-youn	South Korea	2:02.67	+17.08
59	55	Lazaros Arkhontopoulos	Greece	2:03.93	+18.34
60	61	Jamil El-Reedy	Egypt	3:13.86	+88.27
–	17	Peter Dürr	West Germany	DNF	–
