= Alpine skiing at the 1980 Winter Olympics – Men's slalom =

Men's slalom at the XIII Olympic Winter Games
- Alpine skiing
- Venue: Whiteface Mountain
- Date: February 22, 1980
- Competitors: 79 from 28 nations
- Winning time: 1:44.26

Medalists
1st place, gold medalist(s)		Ingemar Stenmark	Sweden
2nd place, silver medalist(s)		Phil Mahre	United States
3rd place, bronze medalist(s)		Jacques Lüthy	Switzerland

The Men's slalom competition of the Lake Placid 1980 Olympics was held at Whiteface Mountain.

The defending world champion was Ingemar Stenmark of Sweden, who was also the defending World Cup slalom champion and the leader of the 1980 World Cup.

== Results ==
Rank	Name	Country	Run 1	Run 2	Total	Difference
1st place, gold medalist(s)	Ingemar Stenmark	Sweden	0:53.89	0:50.37	1:44.26	—
2nd place, silver medalist(s)	Phil Mahre	United States	0:53.31	0:51.45	1:44.76	+0.50
3rd place, bronze medalist(s)	Jacques Lüthy	Switzerland	0:53.70	0:51.36	1:45.06	+0.80
4	Hans Enn	Austria	0:53.70	0:51.42	1:45.12	+0.86
5	Christian Neureuther	West Germany	0:54.37	0:50.77	1:45.14	+0.88
6	Petar Popangelov	Bulgaria	0:54.84	0:50.56	1:45.40	+1.14
7	Anton Steiner	Austria	0:54.56	0:50.85	1:45.41	+1.15
8	Gustavo Thoeni	Italy	0:54.79	0:51.20	1:45.99	+1.73
9	Vladimir Andreyev	Soviet Union	0:54.97	0:51.68	1:46.65	+2.39
10	Frank Wörndl	West Germany	0:55.30	0:51.89	1:47.19	+2.93
11	Paul Arne Skajem	Norway	0:55.11	0:52.10	1:47.21	+2.95
12	Andreas Wenzel	Liechtenstein	0:54.63	0:53.17	1:47.80	+3.54
13	Jože Kuralt	Yugoslavia	0:55.05	0:52.94	1:47.99	+3.73
14	Bohumír Zeman	Czechoslovakia	0:56.56	0:52.31	1:48.87	+4.61
15	Atsushi Sawada	Japan	0:56.80	0:53.14	1:49.94	+5.68
16	Jarle Halsnes	Norway	0:56.44	0:53.69	1:50.13	+5.87
17	Lyudmil Tonchev	Bulgaria	0:56.85	0:53.38	1:50.23	+5.97
18	Leonhard Stock	Austria	0:56.43	0:53.98	1:50.41	+6.15
19	Khristo Angelov	Bulgaria	0:57.03	0:53.48	1:50.51	+6.25
20	Odd Sørli	Norway	0:56.93	0:54.43	1:51.36	+7.10
21	Mitko Khadzhiev	Bulgaria	0:57.34	0:54.04	1:51.38	+7.12
22	Francisco Fernández Ochoa	Spain	0:57.31	0:54.30	1:51.61	+7.35
23	Jean-Luc Fournier	Switzerland	0:58.95	0:54.53	1:53.48	+9.22
24	Henri Mollin	Belgium	1:01.49	0:57.40	1:58.89	+14.63
25	Sepp Ferstl	West Germany	1:01.77	0:57.53	1:59.30	+15.04
26	Scott Kendall	New Zealand	1:02.27	0:58.72	2:00.99	+16.73
27	Norberto Quiroga	Argentina	1:05.09	0:57.82	2:02.91	+18.65
28	Ross Blyth	Great Britain	1:04.14	0:59.42	2:03.56	+19.30
29	Ivan Bonacalza	Argentina	1:03.23	1:00.38	2:03.61	+19.35
30	Carlos Font	Andorra	1:02.40	1:01.30	2:03.70	+19.44
31	Ricardo Klenk	Argentina	1:04.67	1:00.16	2:04.83	+20.57
32	Antony Guss	Australia	1:04.45	1:00.65	2:05.10	+20.84
33	Giannis Stamatiou	Greece	1:10.86	1:07.27	2:18.13	+33.87
34	Piao Dongyi	China	1:10.89	1:10.71	2:21.60	+37.34
35	Naji Heneine	Lebanon	1:07.87	1:18.52	2:26.39	+42.13
36	Philippos Xenophontos	Cyprus	1:25.19	1:18.97	2:44.16	+59.90
37	Andreas Pilavakis	Cyprus	1:30.64	1:23.78	2:54.42	+70.16
-	Mauro Bernardi	Italy	0:55.40	DNF	-	-
-	Boris Strel	Yugoslavia	0:55.44	DNF	-	-
-	Stig Strand	Sweden	0:55.64	DNF	-	-
-	Toshihiro Kaiwa	Japan	0:55.78	DNF	-	-
-	Albert Burger	West Germany	0:56.98	DQ	-	-
-	Sami Rebez	Lebanon	DNF	-	-	-
-	Guillermo Giumelli	Argentina	DNF	-	-	-
-	Björn Olgeirsson	Iceland	DNF	-	-	-
-	Sigurður Jónsson	Iceland	DNF	-	-	-
-	Jorge García	Spain	DNF	-	-	-
-	Victor Hugo Ascarrunz, Jr.	Bolivia	DNF	-	-	-
-	Hong In-Gi	South Korea	DNF	-	-	-
-	Patrick Toussaint	Andorra	DNF	-	-	-
-	Lazarakis Kekhagias	Greece	DNF	-	-	-
-	Arturo Kinch	Costa Rica	DNF	-	-	-
-	Billy Farwig	Bolivia	DNF	-	-	-
-	Konrad Bartelski	Great Britain	DNF	-	-	-
-	Miguel Font	Andorra	DNF	-	-	-
-	Stuart Blakely	New Zealand	DNF	-	-	-
-	Mark Vryenhoek	New Zealand	DNF	-	-	-
-	Roddy Langmuir	Great Britain	DNF	-	-	-
-	Didier Lamont	Belgium	DNF	-	-	-
-	Alan Stewart	Great Britain	DNF	-	-	-
-	Scott Alan Sánchez	Bolivia	DNF	-	-	-
-	Rob McIntyre	Australia	DNF	-	-	-
-	Jorge Pérez	Spain	DNF	-	-	-
-	Pete Patterson	United States	DNF	-	-	-
-	Billy Taylor	United States	DNF	-	-	-
-	Janez Zibler	Yugoslavia	DNF	-	-	-
-	Joël Gaspoz	Switzerland	DNF	-	-	-
-	Knut Erik Johannessen	Norway	DNF	-	-	-
-	Steve Mahre	United States	DNF	-	-	-
-	Bruno Nöckler	Italy	DNF	-	-	-
-	Osamu Kodama	Japan	DNF	-	-	-
-	Paolo De Chiesa	Italy	DNF	-	-	-
-	Aleksandr Shirov	Soviet Union	DNF	-	-	-
-	Peter Lüscher	Switzerland	DNF	-	-	-
-	Paul Frommelt	Liechtenstein	DNF	-	-	-
-	Lazaros Arkhontopoulos	Greece	DQ	-	-	-
-	Torsten Jakobsson	Sweden	DQ	-	-	-
-	Christian Orlainsky	Austria	DQ	-	-	-
-	Bojan Križaj	Yugoslavia	DQ	-	-	-
