= List of flag bearers for Greece at the Olympics =

Greece at the Olympics
- IOC code: GRE
- NOC: Hellenic Olympic Committee
- Website: www.hoc.gr (in Greek and English)
- Medals: Gold 36 Silver 46 Bronze 47 Total 129

Summer appearances
- 1896; 1900; 1904; 1908; 1912; 1920; 1924; 1928; 1932; 1936; 1948; 1952; 1956; 1960; 1964; 1968; 1972; 1976; 1980; 1984; 1988; 1992; 1996; 2000; 2004; 2008; 2012; 2016; 2020; 2024

Winter appearances
- 1936; 1948; 1952; 1956; 1960; 1964; 1968; 1972; 1976; 1980; 1984; 1988; 1992; 1994; 1998; 2002; 2006; 2010; 2014; 2018; 2022; 2026

Other related appearances
- 1906 Intercalated Games

This is a list of flag bearers who have represented Greece at the Olympics.

Flag bearers carry the national flag of their country at the opening ceremony of the Olympic Games.

#	Event year	Season	Flag bearer	Sport
1	1908	Summer	Nikolaos Georgantas	Athletics (discus throw)
2	1912	Summer	Kostas Tsiklitiras	Athletics (long jump)
3	1920	Summer	Vasilios Zarkadis	Fencing
4	1924	Summer	Christos Vrettos	Athletics
5	1928	Summer	Antonios Karyofyllis	Athletics
6	1932	Summer	Christos Mantikas	Athletics (400m hurdles)
7	1936	Winter	Dimitrios Negrepontis	Alpine skiing
8	1936	Summer	Ioannis Skiadas	Athletics
9	1948	Winter	Fotis Mavriplis	Alpine skiing
10	1948	Summer	Georgios Kalambokidis	Sailing
11	1952	Winter	Angelos Lembesi	Alpine skiing
12	1952	Summer	Nikolaos Syllas	Athletics (discus throw)
13	1956	Winter	Alexandros Vouxinos	Alpine skiing
14	1956	Summer	Georgios Roubanis	Athletics (pole vault)
15	1960	Summer	Crown Prince Konstantinos	Sailing
16	1964	Winter	Dimitrios Pappos	Alpine skiing
17	1964	Summer	Georgios Marsellos	Athletics (110m hurdles)
18	1968	Winter	Dimitrios Pappos	Alpine skiing
19	1968	Summer	Christos Papanikolaou	Athletics (pole vault)
20	1972	Winter	Panagiotis Alexandris	Alpine skiing
21	1972	Summer	Christos Papanikolaou	Athletics (pole vault)
22	1976	Winter	Spyros Theodorou	Alpine skiing
23	1976	Summer	Vasilios Papageorgopoulos	Athletics (100m)
24	1980	Winter	Lazaros Arkhontopoulos	Alpine skiing
25	1980	Summer	Ilias Hatzipavlis	Sailing
26	1984	Winter	Andreas Pantelidis	Alpine skiing
27	1984	Summer	Stelios Mygiakis	Wrestling
28	1988	Winter	Athanassios Tsakiris	Cross-country skiing
29	1988	Summer	Charalambos Cholidis	Wrestling
30	1992	Winter	Athanassios Tsakiris	Biathlon and cross-country skiing
31	1992	Summer	Labros Papakostas	Athletics (high jump)
32	1994	Winter	Thomai Lefousi	Alpine skiing
33	1996	Summer	Pyrros Dimas	Weightlifting
34	1998	Winter	Vassilis Dimitriadis	Alpine skiing
35	2000	Summer	Nikolaos Kaklamanakis	Sailing
36	2002	Winter	Lefteris Fafalis	Cross-country skiing
37	2004	Summer	Pyrros Dimas	Weightlifting
38	2006	Winter	Lefteris Fafalis	Cross-country skiing
39	2008	Summer	Ilias Iliadis	Judo
40	2010	Winter	Athanassios Tsakiris	Biathlon
41	2012	Summer	Alexandros Nikolaidis	Taekwondo
42	2014	Winter	Panagiota Tsakiri	Cross-country skiing
43	2016	Summer	Sofia Bekatorou	Sailing
44	2018	Winter	Sophia Ralli	Alpine skiing
45	2020	Summer	Anna Korakaki	Shooting
45	2020	Summer	Eleftherios Petrounias	Gymnastics
46	2022	Winter	Apostolos Angelis	Cross-country skiing
46	2022	Winter	Maria Ntanou	Cross-country skiing
47	2024	Summer	Giannis Antetokounmpo	Basketball
47	2024	Summer	Antigoni Drisbioti	Athletics

== See also ==
- Greece at the Olympics
