= Cross-country skiing at the 1984 Winter Olympics – Men's 15 kilometre =

Men's 15 kilometre at the XIV Olympic Winter Games
- Cross-country skiing
- Venue: Igman
- Date: 13 February 1984
- Competitors: 91 from 31 nations
- Winning time: 41:25.6

Medalists
1st place, gold medalist(s)		Gunde Svan; Sweden
2nd place, silver medalist(s)		Aki Karvonen; Finland
3rd place, bronze medalist(s)		Harri Kirvesniemi; Finland

The 15 kilometre cross-country skiing event was part of the cross-country skiing programme at the 1984 Winter Olympics, in Sarajevo, Yugoslavia. It was the eighth appearance of the event at its length of 15 km. The competition was held on Monday, 13 February 1984 at Veliko Polje, Igman. Of the 91 athletes who started the race, 8 did not finish or were disqualified.

Gunde Svan of Sweden won gold, his first Olympic gold medal, being the youngest ever Olympic cross-country gold medallist. Defending Olympic champion and fellow Swede, Thomas Wassberg did not defend his title preferring to concentrate on other events. Ove Aunli of Norway was disqualified after finishing fifth for using illegal skate strokes at the climax of the race.

== Results ==
Rank	Bib	Name	Country	Time
1	73	Gunde Svan	Sweden	41:25.6
2	63	Aki Karvonen	Finland	41:34.9
3	37	Harri Kirvesniemi	Finland	41:45.6
4	88	Juha Mieto	Finland	42:05.8
5	8	Vladimir Nikitin	Soviet Union	42:31.6
6	86	Nikolay Zimyatov	Soviet Union	42:34.5
7	74	Uwe Bellmann	East Germany	42:35.8
8	54	Tor Håkon Holte	Norway	42:37.4
9	72	Maurilio De Zolt	Italy	42:40.0
10	33	Oleksandr Batyuk	Soviet Union	42:42.2
11	89	Andi Grünenfelder	Switzerland	42:45.7
12	35	Giachem Guidon	Switzerland	42:45.9
13	5	Kari Härkönen	Finland	42:49.3
14	46	Giorgio Vanzetta	Italy	42:54.9
15	17	Sven-Erik Danielsson	Sweden	42:55.9
16	62	Aleksandr Zavyalov	Soviet Union	42:59.0
17	27	Pål Gunnar Mikkelsplass	Norway	42:59.7
18	70	Dan Simoneau	United States	43:03.4
19	42	Benny Kohlberg	Sweden	43:21.5
20	13	Geir Holte	Norway	43:23.3
21	49	Pierre Harvey	Canada	43:36.4
22	52	Torgny Mogren	Sweden	43:39.4
23	56	Uwe Wünsch	East Germany	43:49.9
24	1	Giulio Capitanio	Italy	43:50.8
25	79	Alois Stadlober	Austria	43:51.6
26	4	Frank Schröder	East Germany	43:52.1
27	77	Bill Koch	United States	43:53.7
28	59	Konrad Hallenbarter	Switzerland	44:00.3
29	91	Miloš Bečvář	Czechoslovakia	44:00.8
30	57	Stefan Dotzler	West Germany	44:02.6
31	69	Dominique Locatelli	France	44:07.5
32	19	Markus Fähndrich	Switzerland	44:08.0
33	44	Franz Schöbel	West Germany	44:11.1
34	32	Gianfranco Polvara	Italy	44:35.7
35	22	Ivo Čarman	Yugoslavia	45:04.0
36	87	Józef Łuszczek	Poland	45:04.8
37	7	Josef Schneider	West Germany	45:08.7
38	80	Atanas Simidchiev	Bulgaria	45:17.0
39	45	Tim Caldwell	United States	45:21.2
40	82	Dušan Đurišič	Yugoslavia	45:24.6
41	21	Karsten Brandt	East Germany	45:40.1
42	20	Konstantin Ritter	Liechtenstein	45:41.5
43	65	Hideaki Yamada	Japan	45:42.3
44	26	Jean-Denis Jaussaud	France	45:44.4
45	50	José Giro	Spain	45:50.3
46	67	Pavel Benc	Czechoslovakia	46:03.8
47	84	Kazunari Sasaki	Japan	46:04.8
48	2	Sašo Grajf	Yugoslavia	46:21.1
49	68	Einar Ólafsson	Iceland	46:21.7
50	38	Satoshi Sato	Japan	46:25.5
51	25	Svetoslav Atanasov	Bulgaria	46:28.9
52	61	Milush Ivanchev	Bulgaria	46:30.1
53	47	Andreas Gumpold	Austria	46:34.5
54	3	Todd Boonstra	United States	46:36.5
55	23	Gottlieb Konráðsson	Iceland	46:37.8
56	9	Yusei Nakazawa	Japan	46:38.6
57	85	John Spotswood	Great Britain	46:53.7
58	60	Mark Moore	Great Britain	47:03.2
59	53	David Hislop	Australia	47:25.5
60	31	Mike Dixon	Great Britain	48:18.6
61	24	Miguel Prat	Spain	48:30.6
62	83	Park Ki-ho	South Korea	48:55.6
63	15	Marty Watkins	Great Britain	49:08.7
64	40	Chris Allen	Australia	49:14.5
65	58	Luvsandashiin Dorj	Mongolia	49:17.8
66	71	Song Shi	China	49:42.1
67	90	Li Xiaoming	China	50:03.3
68	28	Lin Guanghao	China	50:26.1
69	16	Zhu Dianfa	China	50:42.3
70	6	Nihattin Koca	Turkey	51:58.7
71	48	Kim Bo-nam	South Korea	52:04.4
72	75	Norberto von Baumann	Argentina	52:08.9
73	64	Julio Moreschi	Argentina	52:19.1
74	55	Erhan Dursun	Turkey	53:40.3
75	41	Ricardo Holler	Argentina	54:34.6
76	18	Martín Pearson	Argentina	54:50.0
77	14	Dimitrios Biliouris	Greece	56:07.7
78	43	Lazaros Tosounidis	Greece	57:09.7
79	29	Arturo Kinch	Costa Rica	58:42.9
80	66	Ueng Ming-yih	Chinese Taipei	1:00:10.6
81	12	Chang Kun-shung	Chinese Taipei	1:02:57.7
82	11	Andrea Sammaritani	San Marino	1:03:05.3
83	36	Wang Chi-hing	Chinese Taipei	1:03:17.0
	34	Muzaffer Selçuk	Turkey	DNF
	78	Jochen Behle	West Germany	DNF
DQ	10	Dondogiin Gankhuyag	Mongolia	DQ
DQ	30	Vangansürengiin Renchinkhorol	Mongolia	DQ
DQ	39	Cho Sung-hoon	South Korea	DQ
DQ	51	Jože Klemenčič	Yugoslavia	DQ
DQ	81	Ove Aunli	Norway	DQ
DQ	76	Pürevjavyn Batsükh	Mongolia	DQ
