= Bulgaria at the 1980 Winter Olympics =

- Flag of Bulgaria
- IOC code: BUL
- NOC: Bulgarian Olympic Committee
- Website: www.bgolympic.org (in Bulgarian and English)

in Lake Placid
- Competitors: 8 in 3 sports
- Flag bearer: Petar Popangelov
- Medals: Gold 0 Silver 0 Bronze 1 Total 1

Winter Olympics appearances (overview)
- 1936; 1948; 1952; 1956; 1960; 1964; 1968; 1972; 1976; 1980; 1984; 1988; 1992; 1994; 1998; 2002; 2006; 2010; 2014; 2018; 2022; 2026; 2030

Bulgaria competed at the 1980 Winter Olympics in Lake Placid, United States.

== Medalists ==
Medal	Name	Sport	Event
Bronze	Ivan Lebanov	Cross-country skiing	Men's 30 km

Lebanov was the first Bulgarian to win a Winter Olympics Medal.

== Alpine skiing ==
Men

Athlete	Event	Race 1		Race 2		Total	
Athlete	Event	Time	Rank	Time	Rank	Time	Rank
Khristo Angelov	Giant Slalom	1:25.97	40	1:26.81	33	2:52.78	32
Mitko Khadzhiev	Giant Slalom	1:25.27	37	1:25.15	30	2:50.42	31
Petar Popangelov	Giant Slalom	1:23.80	34	1:24.32	25	2:48.12	27
Lyudmil Tonchev	Giant Slalom	1:23.73	33	1:25.09	29	2:48.82	30
Mitko Khadzhiev	Slalom	57.34	27	54.04	20	1:51.38	21
Khristo Angelov	Slalom	57.03	25	53.48	17	1:50.51	19
Lyudmil Tonchev	Slalom	56.85	22	53.38	16	1:50.23	17
Petar Popangelov	Slalom	54.84	9	50.56	2	1:45.40	6

== Biathlon ==
Men

Event	Athlete	Misses ^{1}	Time	Rank
10 km Sprint	Yuri Mitev	4	37:23.95	36
10 km Sprint	Vladimir Velichkov	5	37:10.71	34

Event	Athlete	Time	Penalties	Adjusted time ^{2}	Rank
20 km	Vladimir Velichkov	1'09:57.24	18	1'27:57.24	43
20 km	Yuri Mitev	1'11:58.06	10	1'21:58.06	40

^{1} A penalty loop of 150 metres had to be skied per missed target.
^{2} One minute added per close miss (a hit in the outer ring), two minutes added per complete miss.

== Cross-country skiing ==
Men

Event	Athlete	Race	
Event	Athlete	Time	Rank
15 km	Khristo Barzanov	45:05.21	38
15 km	Ivan Lebanov	43:37.32	15
30 km	Khristo Barzanov	1'32:03.49	23
30 km	Ivan Lebanov	1'28:03.87	3rd place, bronze medalist(s)
