= 1981 Alpine Skiing World Cup – Men's combined =

1981 Combined World Cup
Previous: 1980	Next: 1982

Men's combined World Cup 1980/1981

== Calendar ==
Round	Race No	Discipline	Place	Country	Date	Winner	Second	Third
1	5	Slalom; Downhill	Madonna di Campiglio; Val Gardena	Italy; Italy	December 9, 1980; December 14, 1980	(Switzerland) Peter Müller	(Austria) Leonhard Stock	(Liechtenstein) Andreas Wenzel
2	9	Downhill; Giant	Val d'Isère; Ebnat Kappel	France; France	December 7, 1980; January 4, 1981	(Liechtenstein) Andreas Wenzel	(Austria) Hans Enn	(United States) Phil Mahre
3	12	Giant; Downhill	Morzine; Garmisch-Partenkirchen	France; West Germany	January 6, 1981; January 10, 1981	(United States) Phil Mahre	(Switzerland) Peter Müller	(Liechtenstein) Andreas Wenzel
4	16	Slalom; Downhill	Oberstaufen; Kitzbühel	West Germany; Austria	January 13, 1981; January 17, 1981	(United States) Phil Mahre	(United States) Steve Mahre	(Sweden) Ingemar Stenmark
5	23	Downhill; Slalom	St. Anton	Austria	January 31, 1981; February 1, 1981	(United States) Phil Mahre	(Italy) Herbert Plank	(West Germany) Herbert Renoth

== Final point standings ==
In men's combined World Cup 1980/81 the best 5 results count.

Place	Name	Country	Total points	5 (Italy)	9 (France) (Switzerland)	12 (France) (Germany)	16 (Germany) (Austria)	23 (Austria)
1	Phil Mahre	United States	102	12	15	25	25	25
2	Andreas Wenzel	Liechtenstein	55	15	25	15	-	-
3	Peter Müller	Switzerland	45	25	-	20	-	-
4	Hans Enn	Austria	31	11	20	-	-	-
5	Steve Mahre	United States	29	9	-	-	20	-
6	Siegfried Kerschbaumer	Italy	28	7	10	11	-	-
7	Leonhard Stock	Austria	20	20	-	11	-	-
	Jacques Lüthy	Switzerland	20	8	12	-	-	-
	Herbert Plank	Italy	20	-	-	-	-	20
	Even Hole	Norway	20	-	-	-	8	12
11	Henri Mollin	Belgium	18	-	-	-	7	11
12	Bojan Križaj	Yugoslavia	17	5	-	12	-	-
	Boris Strel	Yugoslavia	17	-	9	8	-	-
	Valeri Tsyganov	Soviet Union	17	6	-	-	11	-
15	Ingemar Stenmark	Sweden	15	-	-	-	15	-
	Herbert Renoth	West Germany	15	-	-	-	-	15
17	Bohumír Zeman	Czechoslovakia	12	-	-	-	12	-
18	Pirmin Zurbriggen	Switzerland	11	-	11	-	-	-
	Mike Farney	United States	11	3	8	-	-	-
20	Peter Lüscher	Switzerland	10	10	-	-	-	-
	Klaus Gattermann	West Germany	10	-	-	10	-	-
	Hiroaki Ohtaka	Japan	10	-	-	-	10	-
23	Peter Roth	West Germany	9	-	-	9	-	-
	Shinya Chiba	Japan	9	-	-	-	9	-
25	Jože Kuralt	Yugoslavia	7	-	7	-	-	-
	Robert McKee	Ireland	7	-	-	7	-	-
27	Grega Benedik	Yugoslavia	6	-	6	-	-	-
	Sepp Wildgruber	West Germany	6	1	5	-	-	-
29	Michael Veith	West Germany	4	4	-	-	-	-
	Ivan Pacek	Czechoslovakia	4	-	4	-	-	-
31	Miroslav Oberstar	Yugoslavia	3	-	3	-	-	-
32	Rune Safvenberg	Sweden	2	2	-	-	-	-
	Janez Zibler	Yugoslavia	2	-	2	-	-	-
34	Tomaž Cerkovnik	Yugoslavia	1	-	1	-	-	-

Note:

In race 3, 4 and 5 not all points were awarded (not enough finishers).

== Men's combined team results ==
bold indicate highest score - italics indicate race wins

Place	Country	Total points	5 (Italy)	9 (France) (Switzerland)	12 (France) (Germany)	16 (Germany) (Austria)	23 (Austria)	Racers	Wins
1	United States	142	24	23	25	**45**	25	3	3
2	Switzerland	86	43	23	20	-	-	4	1
3	Liechtenstein	55	15	25	15	-	-	1	1
4	Yugoslavia	53	5	28	20	-	-	7	0
5	Austria	51	31	20	-	-	-	2	0
6	Italy	48	7	10	11	-	20	2	0
7	West Germany	44	5	5	19	-	15	5	0
8	Norway	20	-	-	-	8	12	1	0
9	Japan	19	-	-	-	19	-	2	0
10	Belgium	18	-	-	-	7	11	1	0
11	Sweden	17	2	-	-	15	-	2	0
	Soviet Union	17	6	-	-	11	-	1	0
13	Czechoslovakia	16	-	4	-	12	-	2	0
14	Ireland	7	-	-	7	-	-	1	0

**Alpine skiing World Cup**
**Men**

Overall | Downhill | Giant slalom | Slalom | Combined

**1981**
