= David Mercer =

David Mercer may refer to:

- Sir David Mercer (Royal Marines officer) (1864–1920), British Royal Marines officer
- David Mercer (footballer, born 1893) (1893–1950), England international footballer
- David Mercer (footballer, born 1918) (1918–1986), English footballer
- David Mercer (playwright) (1928–1980), English dramatist
- David Henry Mercer (1857–1919), U.S. representative from Nebraska
- David Mercer (broadcaster) (1950–2020), British sports presenter
- David Mercer (weightlifter) (born 1961), British Olympic weightlifter
- David Mercer (cricketer) (born 1962), English cricketer
- David Mercer (writer) (born 1976), technical writer
- David Mercer (alpine skier) (born 1960), British former alpine skier
- David Mercer (racing driver) (born 1949), British former racing driver
- David Mercer (political commentator) (1961–2021), American Democratic fundraiser and commentator

== See also ==
- David Mercer MacDougall (1904–1991), colonial secretary of Hong Kong, 1945–1949
