= Bulgaria at the 1984 Winter Olympics =

- IOC code: BUL
- NOC: Bulgarian Olympic Committee
- Website: www.bgolympic.org (in Bulgarian and English)

in Sarajevo
- Competitors: 16 (15 men and 1 woman) in 5 sports
- Flag bearer: Vladimir Velichkov
- Medals: Gold 0 Silver 0 Bronze 0 Total 0

Winter Olympics appearances (overview)
- 1936; 1948; 1952; 1956; 1960; 1964; 1968; 1972; 1976; 1980; 1984; 1988; 1992; 1994; 1998; 2002; 2006; 2010; 2014; 2018; 2022; 2026; 2030

Bulgaria competed at the 1984 Winter Olympics in Sarajevo, Yugoslavia.

== Alpine skiing ==
Men

Athlete	Event	Race 1		Race 2		Total	
Athlete	Event	Time	Rank	Time	Rank	Time	Rank
Borislav Kiryakov	Giant Slalom	DNF	–	–	–	DNF	–
Mitko Khadzhiev	Giant Slalom	1:27.50	32	1:26.84	29	2:54.34	31
Valentin Gichev	Giant Slalom	1:26.12	31	1:26.52	28	2:52.64	28
Petar Popangelov	Giant Slalom	1:24.83	26	1:23.61	20	2:48.44	21
Mitko Khadzhiev	Slalom	DNF	–	–	–	DNF	–
Borislav Kiryakov	Slalom	57.00	26	53.24	15	1:50.24	15
Valentin Gichev	Slalom	54.32	23	DSQ	–	DSQ	–
Petar Popangelov	Slalom	52.40	6	48.28	4	1:40.68	6

== Biathlon ==
Men

Event	Athlete	Misses ^{1}	Time	Rank
10 km Sprint	Spas Zlatev	2	34:51.2	38
10 km Sprint	Yuri Mitev	1	34:17.4	31
10 km Sprint	Vladimir Velichkov	0	32:27.6	14

Event	Athlete	Time	Penalties	Adjusted time ^{2}	Rank
20 km	Yuri Mitev	1'16:05.4	8	1'24:05.4	40
20 km	Spas Zlatev	1'16:10.9	5	1'21:10.9	27
20 km	Vladimir Velichkov	1'13:47.1	5	1'18:47.1	13

^{1} A penalty loop of 150 metres had to be skied per missed target.
^{2} One minute added per missed target.

== Cross-country skiing ==
Men

Event	Athlete	Race	
Event	Athlete	Time	Rank
15 km	Milush Ivanchev	46:30.1	52
15 km	Svetoslav Atanasov	46:28.9	51
15 km	Atanas Simidchiev	45:17.0	38
30 km	Khristo Barzanov	1'41:39.9	53
30 km	Svetoslav Atanasov	1'39:25.8	48
30 km	Milush Ivanchev	1'39:16.4	45
50 km	Atanas Simidchiev	DNF	–
50 km	Milush Ivanchev	2'32:15.9	40

Men's 4 × 10 km relay

Athletes	Race	
Athletes	Time	Rank
Svetoslav Atanasov; Atanas Simidchiev; Milush Ivanchev; Khristo Barzanov	2'03:17.6	10

== Figure skating ==
Ice Dancing

Athletes	CD	OD	FD	TFP	Rank
Cristina Boianova; Yavor Ivanov	18	18	18	36.0	18

== Ski jumping ==
Athlete	Event	Jump 1		Jump 2		Total	
Athlete	Event	Distance	Points	Distance	Points	Points	Rank
Angel Stoyanov	Normal hill	72.5	74.0	77.0	83.2	157.2	49
Vladimir Breychev	Normal hill	80.5	89.3	86.0	100.1	189.4	19
Valentin Bozhkov	Normal hill	79.5	89.7	76.0	81.1	170.8	37
Angel Stoyanov	Large hill	82.0	59.0	77.0	49.5	108.5	49
Vladimir Breychev	Large hill	85.0	64.2	92.0	75.5	139.7	42
