= 1982 Alpine Skiing World Cup – Men's combined =

1982 Combined World Cup
Previous: 1981	Next: 1983

Men's combined World Cup 1981/1982

== Calendar ==
Round	Race No	Discipline	Place	Country	Date	Winner	Second	Third
1	3	Downhill; Giant	Val d'Isère; Aprica	France; Italy	December 3, 1981; December 8, 1981	(United States) Phil Mahre	(Liechtenstein) Andreas Wenzel	(Austria) Leonhard Stock
2	6	Slalom; Downhill	Madonna di Campiglio; Val Gardena	Italy; Italy	December 9, 1981; December 13, 1981	(United States) Phil Mahre	(Liechtenstein) Andreas Wenzel	(Norway) Even Hole
3	13	Slalom; Downhill	Bad Wiessee; Kitzbühel	West Germany; Austria	January 12, 1982; January 15, 1982	(United States) Phil Mahre	(Liechtenstein) Andreas Wenzel	(West Germany) Peter Roth
4	19	Downhill; Slalom	Wengen	Switzerland	January 23, 1982; January 24, 1982	(Switzerland) Pirmin Zurbriggen	(Czechoslovakia) Ivan Pacek	(Italy) Thomas Kementar
5	23	Downhill; Slalom	Garmisch-Partenkirchen	West Germany	February 13, 1982; February 14, 1982	(United States) Steve Mahre	(France) Michel Vion	(Switzerland) Peter Lüscher

== Final point standings ==
In men's combined World Cup 1981/82 all 5 results count.

Place	Name	Country	Total points	3 (France) (Italy)	6 (Italy)	13 (Germany) (Austria)	19 (Switzerland)	23 (Germany)
1	Phil Mahre	United States	75	25	25	25	-	-
2	Andreas Wenzel	Liechtenstein	60	20	20	20	-	-
3	Even Hole	Norway	42	5	15	-	12	10
4	Hubertus von Hohenlohe	Mexico	38	3	11	9	9	6
5	Michel Vion	France	28	8	-	-	-	20
	Klaus Gattermann	West Germany	28	4	12	-	-	12
7	Pirmin Zurbriggen	Switzerland	25	-	-	-	25	-
	Steve Mahre	United States	25	-	-	-	-	25
9	Peter Lüscher	Switzerland	24	9	-	-	-	15
10	Scott Sánchez	Bolivia	21	-	-	10	11	-
11	Ivan Pacek	Czechoslovakia	20	-	-	-	20	-
	Shinya Chiba	Japan	20	-	-	11	-	9
13	Peter Müller	Switzerland	17	10	-	-	-	7
14	Leonhard Stock	Austria	15	15	-	-	-	-
	Peter Roth	West Germany	15	-	-	15	-	-
	Thomas Kementar	Italy	15	-	-	-	15	-
17	Silvano Meli	Switzerland	14	6	-	-	-	8
18	Aleksandr Zhirov	Soviet Union	12	12	-	-	-	-
	Michael Mair	Italy	12	-	-	12	-	-
20	Valeri Tsyganov	Soviet Union	11	11	-	-	-	-
	Peter Dürr	West Germany	11	-	-	-	-	11
22	Michihiko Nakamura	Japan	10	-	-	-	10	-
23	Antony Guss	Australia	8	-	-	-	8	-
24	Bohumír Zeman	Czechoslovakia	7	7	-	-	-	-
	Henri Mollin	Belgium	7	-	-	-	7	-
26	Marc Fulton	New Zealand	5	-	-	-	-	5

Note:

In all races not all points were awarded (not enough finishers).

== Men's combined team results ==
bold indicate highest score - italics indicate race wins

Place	Country	Total points	3 (France) (Italy)	6 (Italy)	13 (Germany) (Austria)	19 (Switzerland)	23 (Germany)	Racers	Wins
1	United States	100	25	25	25	-	25	2	4
2	Switzerland	80	25	-	-	25	**30**	4	1
3	Liechtenstein	60	20	20	20	-	-	1	0
4	West Germany	54	4	12	15	-	23	3	0
5	Norway	42	5	15	-	12	10	1	0
6	Mexico	38	3	11	9	9	6	1	0
7	Japan	30	-	-	11	10	9	2	0
8	France	28	8	-	-	-	20	1	0
9	Czechoslovakia	27	7	-	-	20	-	2	0
	Italy	27	-	-	12	15	-	2	0
11	Soviet Union	23	23	-	-	-	-	2	0
12	Bolivia	21	-	-	10	11	-	1	0
13	Austria	15	15	-	-	-	-	1	0
14	Australia	8	-	-	-	8	-	1	0
15	Belgium	7	-	-	-	7	-	1	0
16	New Zealand	5	-	-	-	-	5	1	0

**Alpine skiing World Cup**
**Men**

Overall | Downhill | Giant slalom | Slalom | Combined

**1982**
