= 2015 Íþróttabandalag Akraness season =

Icelandic sports club season

Íþróttabandalag Akraness (ÍA)
2015 season
- Manager: Gunnlaugur Jónsson
- Stadium: Norðurálsvöllur
- Úrvalsdeild: 7th
- Borgunarbikarinn: 32nd Finals
- Lengjubikarinn: Semi-finals
- Top goalscorer: League: Garðar Gunnlaugsson (9); All: Garðar Gunnlaugsson (14)
Home colours	Away colours

Íþróttabandalag Akraness (ÍA) competed in Úrvalsdeild in the 2015 season after finishing in 2nd place in 1. deild karla in 2014.

The 2015 season was ÍA's 63rd season in the top-flight of Icelandic football.

Gunnlaugur Jónsson head coached the team for the second season running. He was assisted by Jón Þór Hauksson.

ÍA finished the season in 7th place in the league. Garðar Gunnlaugsson took home the bronze shoe with 9 goals in 17 games.

== First team ==
As of 3 October 2015. These players competed in Úrvalsdeild, Borgunarbikarinn, Lengjubikarinn

Note: Flags indicate national team as defined under FIFA eligibility rules; some limited exceptions apply. Players may hold more than one non-FIFA nationality.

No.	Pos.	Nation	Player
1	GK	ISL	Páll Gísli Jónsson
3	FW	ISL	Ragnar Már Lárusson
4	DF	ISL	Arnór Snær Guðmundsson
5	DF	ISL	Ármann Smári Björnsson (captain)
6	MF	ISL	Ingimar Elí Hlynsson
8	MF	ISL	Hallur Flosason
9	FW	ISL	Garðar Bergmann Gunnlaugsson
10	MF	ISL	Jón Vilhelm Ákason
11	MF	ISL	Arnar Már Guðjónsson
12	GK	ISL	Árni Snær Ólafsson
13	FW	LTU	Arsenij Buinickij
14	MF	ISL	Ólafur Valur Valdimarsson
15	DF	ISL	Teitur Pétursson

No.	Pos.	Nation	Player
16	MF	ISL	Þórður Þorsteinn Þórðarson
17	FW	ISL	Tryggvi Hrafn Haraldsson
18	MF	ISL	Albert Hafsteinsson
19	FW	ISL	Eggert Kári Karlsson
20	DF	ISL	Gylfi Veigar Gylfason
21	MF	ISL	Arnór Sigurðsson
22	MF	ISL	Steinar Þorsteinsson
23	MF	ISL	Ásgeir Marteinsson
24	DF	ISL	Árni Þór Árnason
27	DF	ENG	Darren Lough
30	GK	ISL	Marteinn Örn Halldórsson
31	MF	SRB	Marko Andelkovic

== Transfers and loans ==
=== Transfers in ===
Date	Position	No.	Player	From club	Other	Ref
1 December 2014	MF	23	(Iceland) Ásgeir Marteinsson	(Iceland) Fram		
25 January 2015	FW	13	(Lithuania) Arsenij Buinickij	(Iceland) KA		
25 January 2015	MF	31	(Serbia) Marko Andelkovic	(Romania) FC Viitorul Constanța		
21 February 2015	DF	24	(Iceland) Árni Þór Árnason	(Iceland) Kári	Back from Loan	
27 March 2015	GK	30	(Iceland) Marteinn Örn Halldórsson	(Iceland) Reynir Sandgerði		

=== Transfers out ===
Date	Position	No.	Player	To club	Other	Ref
9 January 2015	MF	17	(Iceland) Wentzel Steinarr R Kamban	(Iceland) Afturelding		
29 January 2015	MF	7	(Iceland) Andri Adolphsson	(Iceland) Valur		
13 February 2015	MF	21	(Iceland) Jón Björgvin Kristjánsson	(Iceland) Grótta		
21 February 2015	MF		(Iceland) Atli Albertsson	(Iceland) Afturelding		
20 March 2015	FW	18	(Iceland) Hjörtur Júlíus Hjartarson	(Iceland) Augnablik		

=== Loans in ===
Start Date	End Date	Position	No.	Player	From Club	Ref
30 July 2015	16 October 2015	FW		(Iceland) Ragnar Már Lárusson	(England) Brighton & Hove Albion	

=== Loans out ===
Start Date	End Date	Position	No.	Player	To Club	Ref
1 April 2015	20 May 2015	DF	3	(Iceland) Sindri Snæfells Kristinsson	(Iceland) Kári	
18 April 2015	3 June 2015	MF	14	(Iceland) Ólafur Valur Valdimarsson	(Iceland) Kári	
13 March 2015	16 October 2015	DF		(Iceland) Guðlaugur Þór Brandsson	(Iceland) Kári	
2 April 2015	16 October 2015	DF		(Iceland) Sverrir Mar Smárason	(Iceland) Kári	
24 July 2015	16 October 2015	DF	3	(Iceland) Sindri Snæfells Kristinsson	(Iceland) Kári	

== Pre-season ==
=== Fótbolti.net Cup ===
ÍA took part in the 2015 Fótbolti.net Cup, a pre-season tournament for clubs outside of Reykjavík. The team played in Group 1 along with Breiðablik, FH and Þróttur R. ÍA finished third in the group and played ÍBV in the 5th place final. The game ended 2–2 and went to penalties where ÍA won 4–1.

Date	Round	Opponents	Stadium	Result F–A	Scorers
10 January 2015	Group stage	Þróttur R	Akraneshöllin	3–1	Albert Hafsteins 26' Arnar Már 60' Garðar Gunnl. 87'
17 January 2015	Group stage	Breiðablik	Fífan	0–3	
24 January 2015	Group stage	FH	Akraneshöllin	1–2	Garðar Gunnl. ?'
1 February 2015	5th place final	ÍBV	Akraneshöllin	2–2 (4–1)	Hallur Flosa. 75' Garðar Gunnl. 83'

== Lengjubikarinn ==
ÍA were drawn in group 3 in the Icelandic league cup, Lengjubikarinn, along with Valur, Stjarnan, Keflavík, Grindavík, Haukar, Fjarðabyggð and Þór. ÍA won their first four games against Haukar, Stjarnan, Þór, and Grindavík but eventually lost in the fifth round 3–1 to Valur. On 21 March ÍA secured their place in the quarter-finals by defeating Keflavík 2–1. ÍA secured the 1st place in the group on 29 March by defeating Fjarðabyggð 4–3, with a hat trick from Arsenij Buinickij.

ÍA defeated Fjölnir in the quarter-finals 5–1, with Arsenij Buinickij scoring his second hat trick of the competition. Garðar scored the other two goals while former ÍA player Ragnar Leósson scored Fjölnir's only goal.

On 19 April ÍA lost in the semi-finals to KA after a penalty shootout. The game had ended 1–1 after 90 min with Jón Vilhelm scoring ÍA's only goal.

Date	Round	Opponents	Stadium	Result F–A	Scorers
14 February 2015	Group stage	Haukar	Akraneshöllin	4–3	Jón Vilhelm 23' 42' OG 49' Arnar Már 67'
21 February 2015	Group stage	Stjarnan	Akraneshöllin	2–0	Ásgeir Marteins. 4' Arnar Már 73'
26 February 2015	Group stage	Þór	Boginn	2–1	Garðar Gunnl. 24' Arnar Már 62'
7 March 2015	Group stage	Grindavík	Akraneshöllin	3–2	Arnar Már 9' Garðar Gunnl. 52' Darren Lough 76'
12 March 2015	Group stage	Valur	Egilshöll	1–3	Albert Hafsteinsson 66'
21 March 2015	Group stage	Keflavík	Akraneshöllin	2–1	Arsenij Buinickij 6' Garðar Gunnl. 12'
29 March 2015	Group stage	Fjarðabyggð	Akraneshöllin	4–3	Arsenij Buinickij 52' 63' 84' Marko Andelkovic 68'
16 April 2015	Quarter-finals	Fjölnir	Akraneshöllin	5–1	Arsenij Buinickij 7' 48' 79' Garðar Gunnl. 27' 44'
19 April 2015	Semi-finals	KA	KA-völlur	1–1 (2–4p.)	Jón Vilhelm 30'

== Úrvalsdeild ==
=== League table ===
Pos	Team	Pld	W	D	L	GF	GA	GD	Pts	Qualification or relegation
5	Valur	22	9	6	7	38	31	+7	33	Qualification for the Europa League first qualifying round (Note: Valur qualified for the UEFA Europa League first qualifying round by winning the 2015 Icelandic Cup.)
6	Fjölnir	22	9	6	7	36	35	+1	33	
7	ÍA	22	7	8	7	31	31	0	29	
8	Fylkir	22	7	8	7	26	31	−5	29	
9	Víkingur Reykjavík	22	5	8	9	32	36	−4	23	

Source: KSÍ, Soccerway
Rules for classification: 1) Points; 2) Goal difference; 3) Goals scored; 4) Head-to-head points; 5) Head-to-head goal difference; 6) Head-to-head goals scored; 7) Head-to-head away goals scored; 8) Play-off (only for deciding champion); 9) Draw.

=== Matches ===
Win Draw Loss Upcoming fixture

3 May 2015 1	ÍA	0–1	Stjarnan	Akranes
17:00 GMT	Marko Andelkovic (yellow card) 67'	Report	Ólafur Karl Finsen 23'	Stadium: Norðurálsvöllurinn; Attendance: 1250; Referee: Þóroddur Hjaltalín

11 May 2015 2	Leiknir R	0–1	ÍA	Reykjavík
19:15 GMT	Halldór Kristinn Halldórsson (yellow card) 44'; Ólafur Hrannar Kristjánsson (yellow card) 62'	Report	Garðar Gunnlaugsson 69'; Arnór Snær Guðmundsson (yellow card) 64'; Marko Andelkovic (yellow card) 90'	Stadium: Leiknisvöllur; Attendance: 1227; Referee: Erlendur Eiríksson

17 May 2015 3	ÍA	1–1	Víkingur R	Akranes
19:15 GMT	Garðar Gunnlaugsson 42'; Arnar Már Guðjónsson (yellow card) 89'	Report	Þórður Þorsteinn Þórðarsson 17' (o.g.); Ívar Örn Jónsson (yellow card) 93'	Stadium: Norðurálsvöllurinn; Attendance: 920; Referee: Guðmundur Ársæll Guðmundsson

20 May 2015 4	FH	4–1	ÍA	Hafnarfjörður
19:15 GMT	Atli Viðar Björnsson 29'; Brynjar Ásgeir Guðmundsson 39'; Arnór Snær Guðmundsson 56' (o.g.); Jeremy Serwy 73'; Pétur Viðarsson (yellow card) 60'	Report	Arsenij Buinickij 79'; Albert Hafsteinsson (yellow card) 71'	Stadium: Kaplakrikavöllur; Attendance: 1632; Referee: Vilhjálmur Alvar Þórarinsson

26 May 2015 5	ÍA	0–1	Breiðablik	Akranes
19:15 GMT	Marko Andelkovic (yellow card) 48'	Report	Arnþór Ari Atlason 68'	Stadium: Norðurálsvöllurinn; Attendance: 1050; Referee: Þóroddur Hjaltalín

31 May 2015 6	Fjölnir	2–0	ÍA	Reykjavík
19:15 GMT	Bergsveinn Ólafsson 16'; Þórir Guðjónsson 63' (yellow card) 76'; Viðar Ari Jónsson (yellow card) 59'; Aron Sigurðarson (yellow card) 92'	Report	Albert Hafsteinsson (yellow card) 42'; Ásgeir Marteinsson (yellow card) 49'	Stadium: Fjölnisvöllur; Attendance: 1054; Referee: Garðar Örn Hinriksson

7 June 2015 7	ÍA	0–0	Fylkir	Akranes
19:15 GMT	Arnór Snær Guðmundsson (yellow card) 5'; Ingimar Elí Hlynsson (yellow card) 19'; Þórður Þorsteinn Þórðarson (yellow card) 39'; Albert Hafsteinsson (yellow card) 64'; Marko Andelkovic (yellow card) 70'; Árni Snær Ólafsson (yellow card) 80'	Report	Ragnar Bragi Sveinsson (yellow card) 45'; Ásgeir Börkur Ásgeirsson (yellow card) 63'	Stadium: Norðurálsvöllurinn; Attendance: 754; Referee: Pétur Guðmundsson

15 June 2015 8	KR	1–1	ÍA	Reykjavík
19:15 GMT	Almarr Ormarsson 61'; Kristinn Jóhannes Magnússon (yellow card) 53'; Gunnar Þór Gunnarsson (yellow card) 76'; Grétar Sigfinnur Sigurðarson (yellow card) 92'	Report	Ásgeir Marteinsson 44' (yellow card) 38'; Darren Lough (yellow card) 34'; Jón Vilhelm Ákason (yellow card) 77'	Stadium: KR-völlur; Attendance: 1477; Referee: Þorvaldur Árnason

22 June 2015 9	ÍA	4–2	Keflavík	Akranes
19:15 GMT	Arsenij Buinickij 2'; Own goal 36'; Albert Hafsteinsson 39'; Ásgeir Marteinsson 91'; Darren Lough (yellow card) 67'; Jón Vilhelm Ákason (yellow card) 95'	Report	Sindri Snær Magnússon 15' 34'; Einar Orri Einarsson (yellow card) 93'	Stadium: Norðurálsvöllurinn; Attendance: 940; Referee: Vilhjálmur Alvar Þórarinsson

28 June 2015 10	Valur	4–2	ÍA	Reykjavík
19:15 GMT	Andri Fannar Stefánsson 21'; Patrick Pedersen 30' 41' (yellow card) 88'; Kristinn Ingi Halldórsson 82'; Einar Karl Ingvarsson (yellow card) 53'; Kristinn Freyr Sigurðsson (yellow card) 66'; Iain James Williamson (yellow card) 75'	Report	Jón Vilhelm Ákason 37' (yellow card) 58'; Arsenij Buinickij 65'	Stadium: Vodafonevöllurinn; Referee: Guðmundur Ársæll Guðmundsson

12 July 2015 11	ÍA	3–1	ÍBV	Akranes
17:00 GMT	Arnar Már Guðjónsson 39'; Arsenij Buinickij 47'; Hallur Flosason 75'	Report	Víðir Þorvarðarson 11'; Gunnar Þorsteinsson (yellow card) 35'; Bjarni Gunnarsson (yellow card) 88'	Stadium: Norðurálsvöllurinn; Attendance: 1021; Referee: Þóroddur Hjaltalín

18 July 2015 12	Stjarnan	1–1	ÍA	Garðabær
16:00 GMT	Ólafur Karl Finsen 38'; Arnar Már Björgvinsson (yellow card) 46'	Report	Garðar Gunnlaugsson 76'; Albert Hafsteinsson (yellow card) 27' (yellow card) 63' (red card); Þórður Þorsteinn Þórðarson (yellow card) 65'	Stadium: Samsungvöllurinn; Attendance: 803; Referee: Valdimar Pálsson

26 July 2015 13	ÍA	2–1	Leiknir R	Akranes
19:15 GMT	Eggert Kári Karlsson 38'; Marko Andelkovic 84'; Darren Lough (yellow card) 39'	Report	Halldór Kristinn Halldórsson 90+3'; Eiríkur Ingi Magnússon (yellow card) 73'	Stadium: Norðurálsvöllurinn; Attendance: 1016; Referee: Vilhjálmur Alvar Þórarinsson

5 August 2015 14	Víkingur R	1–1	ÍA	Reykjavík
19:15 GMT	Hallgrímur Mar Steingrímsson 3'; Milos Zivkovic (yellow card) 23'	Report	Garðar Gunnlaugsson 32'; Arnar Már Guðjónsson (yellow card) 53'; Eggert Kári Karlsson (yellow card) 85'	Stadium: Víkingsvöllur; Attendance: 930; Referee: Pétur Guðmundsson

10 August 2015 15	ÍA	2–3	FH	Akranes
19:15 GMT	Arnar Már Guðjónsson 4'; Garðar Gunnlaugsson 81'; Ingimar Elí Hlynsson (yellow card) 25'; Ólafur Valur Valdimarsson (yellow card) 65'; Marko Andelkovic (red card) 90+2'	Report	Atli Viðar Björnsson 24' 53'; Emil Pálsson 50'; Jonathan Hendrickx (yellow card) 46'; Kassim Doumbia (yellow card) 51'; Róbert Örn Óskarsson (yellow card) 90+1'	Stadium: Norðurálsvöllurinn; Attendance: 879; Referee: Garðar Örn Hinriksson

17 August 2015 16	Breiðablik	3–1	ÍA	Kópavogur
18:00 GMT	Jonathan Glenn 47' 88' 90+3'	Report	Albert Hafsteinsson 84'; Ingimar Elí Hlynsson (yellow card) 69'	Stadium: Kópavogsvöllur; Attendance: 1725; Referee: Valdimar Pálsson

24 August 2015 17	ÍA	4–4	Fjölnir	Akranes
18:00 GMT	Jón Vilhelm Ákason 16' 28'; Arnar Már Guðjónsson 32' (yellow card) 68'; Garðar Gunnlaugsson 90+3'; Darren Lough (yellow card) 65'; Árni Snær Ólafsson (yellow card) 75'	Report	Mark Charles Magee 27' 45+2'; Aron Sigurðarson 75'; Kennie Chopart 80'; Jonatan Neftali Diez Gonzales (yellow card) 58'; Guðmundur Böðvar Guðjónsson (yellow card) 62'	Stadium: Norðurálsvöllurinn; Attendance: 821; Referee: Pétur Guðmundsson

30 August 2015 18	Fylkir	0–0	ÍA	Reykjavík
18:00 GMT	Jóhannes Karl Guðjónsson (yellow card) 12'; Tonci Radovinkovic (yellow card) 27'	Report	Jón Vilhelm Ákason (yellow card) 42'; Arnar Már Guðjónsson (yellow card) 50' (yellow card) 69' (red card); Teitur Pétursson (yellow card) 55'	Stadium: Fylkisvöllur; Attendance: 1010; Referee: Þóroddur Hjaltalín

13 September 2015 19	ÍA	0–0	KR	Akranes
17:00 GMT	Ásgeir Marteinsson (yellow card) 75'	Report	Rasmus Christiansen (yellow card) 19'; Gonzalo Balbi Lorenzo (yellow card) 90+4'	Stadium: Norðurálsvöllurinn; Attendance: 976; Referee: Garðar Örn Hinriksson

20 September 2015 20	Keflavík	0–4	ÍA	Keflavík
16:00 GMT	Sindri Snær Magnússon (yellow card) 29'; Leonard Sigurðsson (yellow card) 37'; Frans Elvarsson (yellow card) 74'; Einar Orri Einarsson (yellow card) 83'	Report	Garðar Gunnlaugsson 15' 50'; Þórður Þorsteinn Þórðarsson 25'; Hallur Flosason 30'; Darren Lough (yellow card) 56'	Stadium: Nettóvöllurinn; Attendance: 350; Referee: Pétur Guðmundsson

26 September 2015 21	ÍA	1–0	Valur	Akranes
14:00 GMT	Arnar Már Guðjónsson 27'	Report	Andri Fannar Stefánsson (yellow card) 83'	Stadium: Norðurálsvöllurinn; Attendance: 430; Referee: Gunnar Jarl Jónsson

3 October 2015 22	ÍBV	1–2	ÍA	Vestmannaeyjar
14:00 GMT	Gunnar Heiðar Þorvaldsson 12'; Jón Ingason (yellow card) 48'; Hafsteinn Briem (yellow card) 89'	Report	Garðar Gunnlaugsson 41'; Darren Lough 49'; Arnar Már Guðjónsson (yellow card) 80'; Árni Snær Ólafsson (yellow card) 90+1'	Stadium: Hásteinsvöllur; Attendance: 404; Referee: Sigurður Óli Þórleifsson

=== Results ===
Overall								Home						Away					
Pld	W	D	L	GF	GA	GD	Pts	W	D	L	GF	GA	GD	W	D	L	GF	GA	GD
22	7	8	7	31	31	0	29	4	4	3	17	14	+3	3	4	4	14	17	−3

Last updated: 3 October 2015.
Source: KSÍ

=== Points breakdown ===
- Points at home: 16
- Points away from home: 13
- 6 Points: Leiknir R, Keflavík, ÍBV
- 4 Points:
- 3 Points: Valur
- 2 Points: Víkingur R, KR, Fylkir
- 1 Points: Stjarnan, Fjölnir
- 0 Points: FH, Breiðablik

== Borgunarbikarinn ==
ÍA came into the Icelandic cup, Borgunarbikarinn, in the 32nd finals and were drawn against Fjölnir. ÍA lost the game 0–3.

Win Draw Loss Upcoming fixture

3 June 2014 32nd-finals	ÍA	0–3	Fjölnir	Akranes
19:15 GMT	Marko Andelkovic (yellow card) 18'; Hallur Flosason (yellow card) 57'; Arsenij Buinickij (yellow card) 80'; Ármann Smári Björnsson (yellow card) 85'	Report	Mark Charles Magee 13' 18'; Aron Sigurðarson 83'; Atli Már Þorbergsson (yellow card) 86'	Stadium: Norðurálsvöllur; Attendance: 600; Referee: Guðmundur Ársæll Guðmundsson

== Squad statistics ==
=== Goalscorers ===
Includes all competitive matches.

As of match played 3 October 2015

Rank	Pos.	No.	Player	Úrvalsdeild	Borgunarbikar	Lengjubikar	Total
1	FW	9	(Iceland) Garðar Gunnlaugsson	9	0	5	14
2	FW	13	(Lithuania) Arsenij Buinickij	4	0	7	11
3	MF	11	(Iceland) Arnar Már Guðjónsson	4	0	4	8
4	MF	10	(Iceland) Jón Vilhelm Ákason	3	0	3	6
5	MF	23	(Iceland) Ásgeir Marteinsson	2	0	1	3
6	DF	18	(Iceland) Albert Hafsteinsson	2	0	1	3
7	MF	31	(Serbia) Marko Andelkovic	1	0	1	2
8	MF	8	(Iceland) Hallur Flosason	2	0	0	2
9	DF	27	(England) Darren Lough	1	0	1	2
10	FW	19	(Iceland) Eggert Kári Karlsson	1	0	0	1
11	DF	16	(Iceland) Þórður Þorsteinn Þórðarsson	1	0	0	1

=== Appearances ===
Includes all competitive matches. Numbers in parentheses are sub-appearances.

As of match played 3 October 2015

No.	Pos.	Player	Úrvalsdeild	Borgunarbikar	Lengjubikar	Total
1	GK	(Iceland) Páll Gísli Jónsson	1	1	0	2
3	FW	(Iceland) Ragnar Már Lárusson	(1)	0	0	1
4	DF	(Iceland) Arnór Snær Guðmundsson	16	1	7	24
5	DF	(Iceland) Ármann Smári Björnsson	22	1	8	31
6	MF	(Iceland) Ingimar Elí Hlynsson	7 (4)	0	3 (4)	18
8	MF	(Iceland) Hallur Flosason	8 (7)	1	4 (1)	21
9	FW	(Iceland) Garðar Gunnlaugsson	15 (2)	0	7 (2)	26
10	MF	(Iceland) Jón Vilhelm Ákason	18 (3)	0	6 (2)	29
11	MF	(Iceland) Arnar Már Guðjónsson	16 (3)	1	4 (3)	27
12	GK	(Iceland) Árni Snær Ólafsson	21	0	8	29
13	FW	(Lithuania) Arsenij Buinickij	11 (3)	1	6	21
14	MF	(Iceland) Ólafur Valur Valdimarsson	9 (3)	(1)	(1)	14
15	DF	(Iceland) Teitur Pétursson	4 (1)	(1)	4 (1)	11
16	MF	(Iceland) Þórður Þorsteinn Þórðarsson	22	1	6 (3)	32
17	FW	(Iceland) Tryggvi Hrafn Haraldsson	1 (3)	0	0	4
18	MF	(Iceland) Albert Hafsteinsson	20 (1)	1	7 (1)	30
19	FW	(Iceland) Eggert Kári Karlsson	2 (8)	1	6	17
20	DF	(Iceland) Gylfi Veigar Gylfason	8 (4)	0	4 (3)	19
21	MF	(Iceland) Arnór Sigurðsson	(1)	0	0	19
22	MF	(Iceland) Steinar Þorsteinsson	(1)	0	1 (3)	5
23	MF	(Iceland) Ásgeir Marteinsson	16 (6)	(1)	5 (3)	31
24	DF	(Iceland) Árni Þór Árnason	0	0	(1)	1
27	DF	(England) Darren Lough	18 (1)	1	7 (1)	28
30	GK	(Iceland) Marteinn Örn Halldórsson	0	0	1	1
31	MF	(Serbia) Marko Andelkovic	7 (9)	1	5	22

=== Disciplinary record ===
Includes all competitive matches.

As of match played 3 October 2015

No.	Pos.	Player	Úrvalsdeild			Borgunarbikar			Lengjubikar			Total		
No.	Pos.	Player	Yellow card	Second yellow card	Red card	Yellow card	Second yellow card	Red card	Yellow card	Second yellow card	Red card	Yellow card	Second yellow card	Red card
4	DF	(Iceland) Arnór Snær Guðmundsson	2	0	0	0	0	0	0	0	0	2	0	0
5	DF	(Iceland) Ármann Smári Björnsson	0	0	0	1	0	0	0	0	0	1	0	0
6	MF	(Iceland) Ingimar Elí Hlynsson	3	0	0	0	0	0	1	0	0	4	0	0
8	MF	(Iceland) Hallur Flosason	0	0	0	1	0	0	1	0	0	2	0	0
10	MF	(Iceland) Jón Vilhelm Ákason	4	0	0	0	0	0	2	0	0	6	0	0
11	MF	(Iceland) Arnar Már Guðjónsson	4	1	0	0	0	0	1	0	0	5	1	0
12	GK	(Iceland) Árni Snær Ólafsson	3	0	0	0	0	0	0	0	0	3	0	0
13	MF	(Lithuania) Arsenij Buinickij	0	0	0	1	0	0	1	0	0	2	0	0
14	MF	(Iceland) Ólafur Valur Valdimarsson	1	0	0	0	0	0	0	0	0	1	0	0
15	DF	(Iceland) Teitur Pétursson	1	0	0	0	0	0	0	0	0	1	0	0
16	DF	(Iceland) Þórður Þorsteinn Þórðarsson	2	0	0	0	0	0	1	0	0	3	0	0
18	MF	(Iceland) Albert Hafsteinsson	3	1	0	0	0	0	0	0	0	3	1	0
19	FW	(Iceland) Eggert Kári Karlsson	1	0	0	0	0	0	0	0	0	1	0	0
23	MF	(Iceland) Ásgeir Marteinsson	3	0	0	0	0	0	1	0	0	4	0	0
27	DF	(England) Darren Lough	5	0	0	0	0	0	1	0	0	6	0	0
31	MF	(Serbia) Marko Andelkovic	4	0	1	1	0	0	3	0	0	8	0	1
