= Spain at the 1984 Winter Olympics =

- IOC code: ESP
- NOC: Spanish Olympic Committee
- Website: www.coe.es (in Spanish)

in Sarajevo
- Competitors: 12 (10 men, 3 women) in 5 sports
- Flag bearer: Blanca Fernández Ochoa
- Medals: Gold 0 Silver 0 Bronze 0 Total 0

Winter Olympics appearances (overview)
- 1936; 1948; 1952; 1956; 1960; 1964; 1968; 1972; 1976; 1980; 1984; 1988; 1992; 1994; 1998; 2002; 2006; 2010; 2014; 2018; 2022; 2026

Spain competed at the 1984 Winter Olympics in Sarajevo, Yugoslavia.

== Alpine skiing ==
Men

Athlete	Event	Race 1		Race 2		Total	
Athlete	Event	Time	Rank	Time	Rank	Time	Rank
Carlos Salvadores	Giant Slalom	DSQ	–	–	–	DSQ	–
Luis Fernández Ochoa	Giant Slalom	DNF	–	–	–	DNF	–
Jorge Pérez	Giant Slalom	1:23.64	20	1:24.33	22	2:47.97	20
Carlos Salvadores	Slalom	DNF	–	–	–	DNF	–
Luis Fernández Ochoa	Slalom	55.28	24	DNF	–	DNF	–
Jorge Pérez	Slalom	53.25	13	DSQ	–	DSQ	–

Women

Athlete	Event	Race 1		Race 2		Total	
Athlete	Event	Time	Rank	Time	Rank	Time	Rank
Dolores Fernández Ochoa	Giant Slalom	1:12.05	27	DNF	–	DNF	–
Blanca Fernández Ochoa	Giant Slalom	1:09.52	3	1:12.62	9	2:22.14	6
Dolores Fernández Ochoa	Slalom	DNF	–	–	–	DNF	–
Blanca Fernández Ochoa	Slalom	50.06	15	DNF	–	DNF	–

== Biathlon ==
Men

Event	Athlete	Misses ^{1}	Time	Rank
10 km Sprint	Manuel García	6	40:16.6	56
10 km Sprint	Cecilio Fernández	2	39:27.5	55

Event	Athlete	Time	Penalties	Adjusted time ^{2}	Rank
20 km	Cecilio Fernández	1'25:42.0	9	1'34:42.0	57
20 km	Manuel García	1'24:12.4	10	1'34:12.4	56

^{1} A penalty loop of 150 metres had to be skied per missed target.
^{2} One minute added per missed target.

== Cross-country skiing ==
Men

Event	Athlete	Race	
Event	Athlete	Time	Rank
15 km	Miguel Prat	48:30.6	61
15 km	José Giro	45:50.3	45
30 km	Miguel Prat	1'48:46.3	65
30 km	José Giro	1'43:18.8	56
50 km	Miguel Prat	2'38:07.0	46
50 km	José Giro	2'33:31.5	41

== Figure skating ==
Women

Athlete	CF	SP	FS	TFP	Rank
Marta Cierco-Viqeira	DNF	–	–	DNF	–

== Ski jumping ==
Athlete	Event	Jump 1		Jump 2		Total	
Athlete	Event	Distance	Points	Distance	Points	Points	Rank
Ángel Janiquet	Normal hill	64.5	58.2	67.5	63.5	121.7	58
José Rivera	Normal hill	72.5	71.5	70.0	70.0	141.5	54
Bernat Sola	Normal hill	71.0	72.1	65.5	60.8	132.9	56
Bernat Sola	Large hill	74.0	47.3	77.0	52.0	99.3	50
José Rivera	Large hill	84.0	63.3	76.0	50.6	113.9	48

== Sources ==
- Official Olympic Reports
- Olympic Winter Games 1984, full results by sports-reference.com
