= Ali Fuat =

Ali Fuat may refer to:

- Ali Fuat Ağralı (1877–1957), known as Fuat Ağralı, Turkish politician
- Ali Fuat Başgil (1893–1967), Turkish academic and politician
- Ali Fuat Cebesoy (1882–1968), Turkish military officer
- Ali Fuad Haşıl (born 1966), Turkish alpine skier
