= Lambros Lambrou =

Lambros Lambrou may refer to

- Lambros Lambrou (footballer) (born 1977), Cypriot association football defender
- Lambros Lambrou (skier) (born 1957), Cypriot Olympic alpine skier
