= Tony Sukkar =

Tony Sukkar may refer to:

- Tony Sukkar (skier)
- Tony Sukkar (rugby league), Australian rugby league footballer
