= Tonchev =

Tonchev (Bulgarian: Тончев) is a Bulgarian surname. Notable people with this name include:

- Dimitar Tonchev (born 2007), Bulgarian footballer for Vighignolo calcio
- Dimo Angelov Tonchev (born 1952), Bulgarian cyclist
- Gergina Toncheva (1932–2020), Bulgarian teacher
- Lyudmil Tonchev (born 1958), Bulgarian alpine skier
- Nadya Toncheva (born 2005), Bulgarian chess master
- Petar Tonchev (born 1989), Bulgarian footballer
- Stefan Tonchev (1896–1916), Bulgarian footballer
- Toncho Tonchev, Bulgarian boxer
