= Greece at the 1980 Winter Olympics =

- IOC code: GRE
- NOC: Committee of the Olympic Games

in Lake Placid United States
- Competitors: 3 (men) in 1 sport
- Flag bearer: Lazaros Arkhontopoulos
- Medals: Gold 0 Silver 0 Bronze 0 Total 0

Winter Olympics appearances (overview)
- 1936; 1948; 1952; 1956; 1960; 1964; 1968; 1972; 1976; 1980; 1984; 1988; 1992; 1994; 1998; 2002; 2006; 2010; 2014; 2018; 2022; 2026

Greece competed at the 1980 Winter Olympics in Lake Placid, United States.

== Alpine skiing ==
Men

Athlete	Event	Race 1		Race 2		Total	
Athlete	Event	Time	Rank	Time	Rank	Time	Rank
Lazarakis Kekhagias	Giant Slalom	1:42.16	61	1:41.24	49	3:23.40	51
Giannis Stamatiou	Giant Slalom	1:41.80	60	1:43.19	51	3:24.99	52
Lazaros Arkhontopoulos	Giant Slalom	1:36.32	57	1:39.91	48	3:16.23	48
Lazaros Arkhontopoulos	Slalom	DSQ	–	–	–	DSQ	–
Lazarakis Kekhagias	Slalom	DNF	–	–	–	DNF	–
Giannis Stamatiou	Slalom	1:10.86	39	1:07.27	33	2:18.13	33
