= Satoshi Sato =

Japanese cross-country skier (born 1962)

Personal information
- Nationality: Japanese
- Born: 10 January 1962 (age 63); Yamagata, Japan

Sport
- Sport: Cross-country skiing

Satoshi Sato (佐藤 智, Satō Satoshi; born 10 January 1962) is a Japanese cross-country skier. He competed in the men's 15 kilometre event at the 1984 Winter Olympics.
