= Tomaž Jemc =

Slovenian alpine skier (born 1964)

Tomaž Jemc (born 2 March 1964 in Bled) is a Slovenian former alpine skier who competed for Yugoslavia in the 1984 Winter Olympics, where he finished 30th in the Men's downhill. After his skiing career, he was a national champion rally driver.
