= Ivan Bonacalza =

Argentine alpine skier (born 1962)

Personal information
- Nationality: Argentine
- Born: 16 October 1962 (age 62)

Sport
- Sport: Alpine skiing

Ivan Bonacalza (born 16 October 1962) is an Argentine alpine skier. He competed in the men's slalom at the 1980 Winter Olympics.
