= Scott Sánchez =

Bolivian alpine skier (born 1959)

Scott Alan Sánchez
Personal information
- Nationality: Bolivian
- Born: 18 January 1959 (age 67) New York, New York, United States

Sport
- Sport: Alpine skiing

Scott Alan Sánchez Saunders (born January 18, 1959) is a Bolivian alpine skier who competed in the 1980 Winter Olympics and in the 1984 Winter Olympics. He was born in New York City, United States.

In 1980 he competed in the Olympic downhill event, in the giant slalom competition, and in the slalom contest but did not finish any of these races.

Four years later he finished 34th in the 1984 Olympic giant slalom event and 43rd in the Olympic downhill competition. In the slalom contest he was unable to finish the race again.

In 1982 he scored twice world cup points for Bolivia and finished tenth in the Alpine combined world cup.
