= Ricardo Klenk =

Argentine alpine skier (born 1961)

Personal information
- Nationality: Argentine
- Born: 29 September 1961 (age 63)

Sport
- Sport: Alpine skiing

Ricardo Klenk (born 29 September 1961) is an Argentine alpine skier. He competed in the men's slalom at the 1980 Winter Olympics.
