= Mario Hada =

Bolivian alpine skier (born 1952)

Personal information
- Born: 28 December 1952 (age 72); La Paz, Bolivia

Sport
- Sport: Alpine skiing

Mario Hada (born 28 December 1952) is a Bolivian alpine skier. He competed in the men's giant slalom at the 1984 Winter Olympics.
