= Alistair Guss =

Australian alpine skier (born 1965)

Personal information
- Nationality: Australian
- Born: 10 June 1965 (age 60); Melbourne, Australia

Sport
- Sport: Alpine skiing

Alistair Guss (born 10 June 1965) is an Australian alpine skier. He competed in the men's downhill at the 1984 Winter Olympics.
