= Hamid Oujebbad =

Moroccan alpine skier

Ahmad Ouachit
Personal information
- Nationality: Moroccan

Sport
- Sport: Alpine skiing

Ahmad Ouachit is a Moroccan alpine skier. He competed in the men's giant slalom at the 1984 Winter Olympics.
