= Martín Pearson =

Argentine cross-country skier (born 1962)

Personal information
- Born: 21 December 1962 (age 62); Bariloche, Argentina

Sport
- Sport: Cross-country skiing

Martín Pearson (born 21 December 1962) is an Argentine cross-country skier. He competed in the men's 15 kilometre event at the 1984 Winter Olympics.
