= Renoth =

Renoth is a surname. Notable people with the surname include:

- Heidi Renoth (born 1978), German snowboarder
- Herbert Renoth (born 1962), German alpine skier
