= Greece at the 1988 Winter Olympics =

- IOC code: GRE
- NOC: Committee of the Olympic Games

in Calgary Canada
- Competitors: 6 (5 men, 1 woman) in 2 sports
- Flag bearer: Athanassios Tsakiris
- Medals: Gold 0 Silver 0 Bronze 0 Total 0

Winter Olympics appearances (overview)
- 1936; 1948; 1952; 1956; 1960; 1964; 1968; 1972; 1976; 1980; 1984; 1988; 1992; 1994; 1998; 2002; 2006; 2010; 2014; 2018; 2022; 2026

Greece competed at the 1988 Winter Olympics in Calgary, Alberta, Canada.

== Competitors ==
The following is the list of number of competitors in the Games.

Sport	Men	Women	Total
Alpine skiing	2	1	3
Cross-country skiing	3	0	3
Total	5	1	6

== Alpine skiing ==
Men

Athlete	Event	Race 1	Race 2	Total	
Athlete	Event	Time	Time	Time	Rank
Ioannis Kapraras	Super-G			2:02.06	46
Ioannis Kapraras	Giant Slalom	1:18.23	1:14.64	2:32.87	50
Giannis Stamatiou	Giant Slalom	1:17.36	1:15.10	2:32.46	49
Ioannis Kapraras	Slalom	DNF	–	DNF	–
Giannis Stamatiou	Slalom	DNF	–	DNF	–

Men's combined

Athlete	Downhill	Slalom		Total	
Athlete	Time	Time 1	Time 2	Points	Rank
Giannis Stamatiou	2:07.51	50.45	49.68	347.41	25

Women

Athlete	Event	Race 1	Race 2	Total	
Athlete	Event	Time	Time	Time	Rank
Thomai Lefousi	Super-G			DSQ	–
Thomai Lefousi	Giant Slalom	1:10.26	DNF	DNF	–
Thomai Lefousi	Slalom	1:02.82	1:04.19	2:07.01	25

== Cross-country skiing ==
Men

Event	Athlete	Race	
Event	Athlete	Time	Rank
15 km C	Nikos Anastasiadis	DNF	–
15 km C	Thanasis Tsakiris	50:34.4	72
15 km C	Khristos Titas	49:48.6	66
30 km C	Nikos Anastasiadis	1'50:10.7	82
30 km C	Thanasis Tsakiris	1'43:55.1	76
30 km C	Khristos Titas	1'41:25.7	70

C = Classical style, F = Freestyle
