= Greece at the 1984 Winter Olympics =

- IOC code: GRE
- NOC: Committee of the Olympic Games

in Sarajevo Yugoslavia
- Competitors: 6 (men) in 2 sports
- Flag bearer: Andreas Pantelidis
- Medals: Gold 0 Silver 0 Bronze 0 Total 0

Winter Olympics appearances (overview)
- 1936; 1948; 1952; 1956; 1960; 1964; 1968; 1972; 1976; 1980; 1984; 1988; 1992; 1994; 1998; 2002; 2006; 2010; 2014; 2018; 2022; 2026

Greece competed at the 1984 Winter Olympics in Sarajevo, Yugoslavia.

== Alpine skiing ==
Men

Athlete	Event	Race 1		Race 2		Total	
Athlete	Event	Time	Rank	Time	Rank	Time	Rank
Lazaros Arkhontopoulos	Downhill					2:03.93	59
Andreas Pantelidis	Downhill					2:01.88	56
Giannis Stamatiou	Downhill					2:01.79	55
Giannis Stamatiou	Giant Slalom	1:44.21	62	1:40.97	52	3:25.18	55
Andreas Pantelidis	Giant Slalom	1:39.57	54	1:39.87	50	3:19.44	51
Ioannis Triantafyllidis	Giant Slalom	1:38.20	52	1:40.74	51	3:18.94	50
Lazaros Arkhontopoulos	Giant Slalom	1:35.36	51	1:35.65	49	3:11.01	49
Andreas Pantelidis	Slalom	DSQ	–	–	–	DSQ	–
Ioannis Triantafyllidis	Slalom	1:09.21	47	1:04.68	27		
Giannis Stamatiou	Slalom	1:06.82	43	DSQ	–	DSQ	–
Lazaros Arkhontopoulos	Slalom	1:04.16	40	59.80	25	2:03.96	25

== Cross-country skiing ==
Men

Event	Athlete	Race	
Event	Athlete	Time	Rank
15 km	Lazaros Tosounidis	57:09.7	78
15 km	Dimitrios Biliouris	56:07.7	77
