= Kim Bo-nam =

South Korean cross-country skier

Personal information
- Nationality: South Korean
- Born: 19 October 1961 (age 63)

Sport
- Sport: Cross-country skiing

Kim Bo-nam (born 19 October 1961) is a South Korean cross-country skier. He competed in the men's 15 kilometre event at the 1984 Winter Olympics.
