= Franz Gruber (alpine skier) =

Austrian alpine skier (born 1959)

Franz Gruber (born 8 November 1959) is an Austrian former alpine skier who competed in the 1984 Winter Olympics.

He was born in Kirchdorf an der Krems.

In 1983 he won his only world cup slalom in Kranjska Gora and finished ninth in the 1983 slalom world cup. One year later he finished third in the 1984 slalom world cup.

In 1984 he finished fourth in the Olympic slalom event. He also competed in the giant slalom competition but did not finish the race.
