= Bill Taylor (alpine skier) =

American alpine skier (born 1956)

Bill Taylor (born June 10, 1956 in St. Louis) is an American former alpine skier who competed in the men's slalom at the 1980 Winter Olympics.
