= Eduardo Kopper =

Costa Rican alpine skier (born 1965)

Personal information
- Born: 16 August 1965 (age 59); San José, Costa Rica

Sport
- Sport: Alpine skiing

Eduardo Kopper (born 16 August 1965) is a Costa Rican alpine skier. He competed in two events at the 1984 Winter Olympics.
