= Jacques Lüthy =

Swiss alpine skier (born 1959)

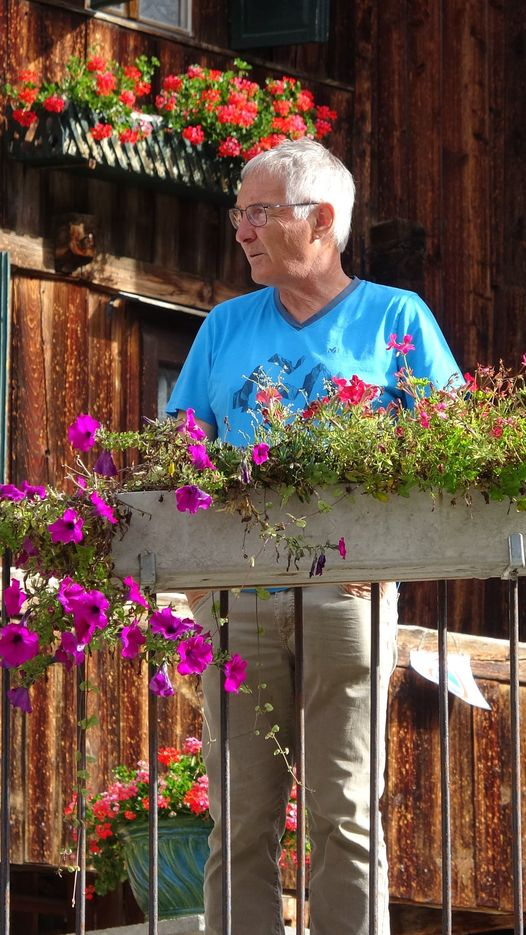

Personal information
- Born: 11 July 1959 (age 66) Charmey, Switzerland
- Occupation: Alpine skier

Olympic medal record

Men's Alpine skiing
Bronze medal – third place	1980 Lake Placid	Slalom

Jacques Lüthy (born 11 July 1959) is a Swiss former alpine skier who competed in the 1980 Winter Olympics. Lüthy was born in Charmey.

In 1980, he won the bronze medal in the slalom event. In the giant slalom competition he finished fifth.

Lüthy concluded his career in 1985 with a total of ten podium finishes at the World Cup.
