= Guðmundur Jóhannsson =

Icelandic alpine skier (born 1963)

Personal information
- Nationality: Icelandic
- Born: 19 February 1963 (age 62); Ísafjörður, Iceland

Sport
- Sport: Alpine skiing

Guðmundur Jóhannsson (born 19 February 1963) is an Icelandic alpine skier. He competed in two events at the 1984 Winter Olympics.
