= Marko Anđelković =

Serbian footballer

Marko Anđelković Марко Анђелковић
Personal information
- Date of birth: October 12, 1984 (age 42)
- Place of birth: Zagreb, SR Croatia, SFR Yugoslavia
- Height: 1.84 m (6 ft 1/2 in)
- Position: Midfielder

Youth career
- Partizan

Senior career*
Years	Team	Apps	(Gls)
2003–2007	Partizan	0	(0)
2003–2005	→ Teleoptik (loan)	49	(8)
2005	→ Obilić (loan)	2	(6)
2006	→ Napredak Kruševac (loan)	14	(5)
2006–2007	→ Dinamo Vranje (loan)	11	(1)
2007–2008	Bellinzona	18	(3)
2008–2009	Voždovac	22	(4)
2009–2010	Inđija	20	(2)
2011–2012	Ekranas	54	(12)
2013	Hapoel Ramat HaSharon	15	(2)
2013–2014	Ekranas	22	(4)
2014	Sūduva	10	(2)
2014	Viitorul Constanța	12	(0)
2015	ÍA Akranes	16	(1)
2016	Budućnost Dobanovci	14	(0)
- * Club domestic league appearances and goals

Marko Anđelković (Serbian Cyrillic: Марко Анђелковић; born 12 October 1984) is a Serbian retired footballer who played as a midfielder.

== Career ==
He was for many years FK Partizan player, but never got to play any official match with them, instead he was being loaned to other clubs to gain experience. He played 3 seasons with Partizan's satellite club FK Teleoptik.

In summer 2005 he was loaned to 1998 national champions FK Obilić and played his only matches in the Serbian top league.

He also played with FK Napredak Kruševac and FK Dinamo Vranje in the Second League before signing, on 23 February 2007, with Swiss club AC Bellinzona where he played until summer 2008. Afterward, he returned to Serbia and signed with FK Voždovac where he played one season, before moving in summer 2009 to the ambitious FK Inđija.

In winter of 2011 he joined Lithuanian Champions FK Ekranas.

In winter of 2013 he joined for the Israeli football club, Ironi Ramat HaSharon

In March 2015 he joined newly promoted Icelandic top division team ÍA.
