= Miguel Prat =

Spanish cross-country skier (born 1955)

Personal information
- Nationality: Spanish
- Born: 19 November 1955 (age 69); Terrassa, Spain

Sport
- Sport: Cross-country skiing

Miguel Prat (born 19 November 1955) is a Spanish cross-country skier. He competed in the men's 15 kilometre event at the 1984 Winter Olympics.
