= David Mercer (writer) =

English technical writer (born 1976)

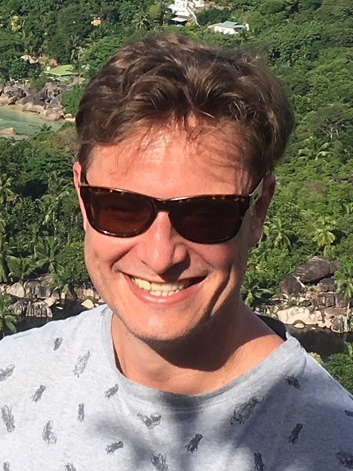
- Born: 1976 (age 49–50)
- Occupation: Technical writer
- Writing career
- Language: English
- Subjects: Programming, web development, business
- Notable work: Beginning PHP5, Professional PHP5, Building online stores with osCommerce: Professional edition

David Mercer (born 1976) is a technical writer of programming, web development and business books.

Mercer has contributed editorially to a number of titles for the open source community, including books on Linux and Perl. He has also written books on PHP and Web technology.

His technical books are sold worldwide and have been translated into French, German, Polish, Greek and Spanish. His book on Drupal 6 was reviewed on Slashdot and went on to become a best seller. Mercer's books have also become recommended reading at higher learning institutes like MIT.

He maintains an online business blog to provide supplementary skills and knowledge for his readership.

== Published Titles ==
- Beginning PHP5. Wrox Press. 2004. ISBN 0-7645-5783-1.
- Professional PHP5. Wrox Press. 2004. ISBN 0-7645-7282-2.
- Building online stores with osCommerce: Professional edition. Packt Publishing. 2005. ISBN 1-904811-14-0.
- Building online stores with osCommerce: Beginner edition. Packt Publishing. 2006. ISBN 1-904811-88-4.
- Drupal. Packt Publishing. 2006. ISBN 1-904811-80-9.
- Drupal 6. Packt Publishing. 2008. ISBN 978-1-84719-297-4.
- Drupal 7. Packt Publishing. 2010. ISBN 978-1-84951-286-2.
- Packt Publishing (2011). Internet marketing for WordPress.
