= Dimitrios Biliouris =

Greek cross-country skier (born 1963)

Personal information
- Nationality: Greek
- Born: 9 April 1963 (age 61); Naousa, Greece

Sport
- Sport: Cross-country skiing

Dimitrios Biliouris (born 9 April 1963) is a Greek cross-country skier. He competed in the men's 15 kilometre event at the 1984 Winter Olympics.
