= Péter Kozma (skier) =

Hungarian alpine skier (1961–2023)

Peter Kozma
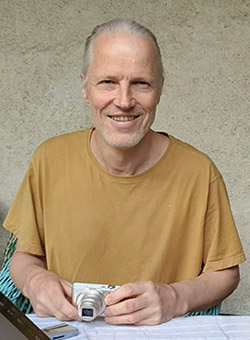

Personal information
- Full name: Peter Thomas Kozma
- Nationality: Hungarian, Swiss
- Education: Hungarian University of Applied Arts
- Website: kozma.foundation

Sport
- Sport: Alpine skiing

Achievements and titles
- Olympic finals: 1984 Winter Olympics (Sarajevo)

Péter Kozma (16 May 1961 – 26 November 2023) was a Swiss-Hungarian alpine skier, Olympian, visual artist, and light artist. He was a pioneering figure in the Hungarian underground culture and modern light painting.

== Biography ==
His parents, Dr. Ottó Kozma and Zsuzsánna Bókay, were Hungarian emigrants who left the country in 1956. Kozma was born in Switzerland and spent his childhood in Solothurn and the Ticino region of southern Switzerland (where his interest in nature and biotopes was established), later moving to Zürich. He studied medicine for two years at the University of Zürich while competing in sports at a professional level.

=== Sports career ===
He began skiing at the age of three, and his talent became apparent early on. In 1981, he became a member of the Swiss University Ski Team, and in 1982, the Swiss National Junior Team, where he matured into a 30-FIS-point racer.

In the early 1980s, during a competition in Italy, he was noticed by János Dörflingen and Barnabás Kovács, coaches of the Hungarian national team. Due to his decision to join the Hungarian team, the Swiss federation revoked his previous points; however, starting in 1983—competing under the Hungarian flag—he regained them within his first three races.

Results representing Hungary:

1984 Winter Olympics (Sarajevo)
He finished 18th in Slalom. This result remains one of the most outstanding achievements in the history of Hungarian men's alpine skiing. He competed in two events at the 1984 Winter Olympics.
Winter Universiade
He achieved 4th place in Sofia in 1983 and 5th place in Nevegal, Italy, in 1985.

He ended his competitive skiing career in 1987 at the age of 27.

=== Studies ===
In 1985, he moved to Budapest. Competitive sports were replaced by extreme sports (snowboarding, windsurfing, sailing), and his interest turned toward the arts. For four years, he was a student at the Faculty of Architecture of the Budapest University of Technology and Economics, and from 1989 he continued his studies at the Hungarian University of Applied Arts (now MOME) in the Visual Communication department. His masters included Erika Katalina Pásztor, János Szirtes, and Dóra Maurer. He obtained his diploma in 2001.

== Frankhegy ==
In 1987, his family purchased a plot of land on Frankhegy in Budaörs, where he originally realized a "biotope project" and land art creations. The location soon became a center for Budapest's underground culture.

- The Beginnings (1990–1994): The site served as a venue for exclusive art gatherings and parties for friends.
- Frankhegy Festival (1995–2002): Following the end of the Nap-Nap Fesztivál, these events evolved into multi-day, all-arts festivals open to the general public. These events, where electronic music met contemporary visual art (primarily installations and performances), were considered unique even at a European level. The festival attracted "nomads of the cyber era," creating a distinct atmosphere that was both close to nature and industrial.

Kozma is also associated with other significant events of the era, such as Törökbálint Katlan (1998), Nap hall - Hajógyár 322 (1999), the Dada-parties held at the Hotel Royal (formerly Apollo Cinema) (1998), Ruhagyár 414 at the former Páva clothing factory, Tresor in Budapest (2000) at the Bartók tram depot, and the PszeudoFrankhegy (2001) events at the former Telecommunications Machine Factory.

== Light Art ==
During his artistic career, Kozma divided his light painting work into two conceptually distinct eras and methodologies: Raypainting (co-created with Dóra Berkes) and the later, independent and collective Light Art Installation projects.

=== Raypainting (1996–2006) ===
The term and technique of Raypainting covers the collaborative work of Péter Kozma and his creative partner, Dóra Berkes (DJ Dork). The essence of the technique involved projecting hand-painted 18x18 cm glass plates onto buildings, hillsides, or entire city districts using high-performance (Pani) projectors. While Kozma was responsible for the technical execution, site selection, and spatial organization, Dóra Berkes created the alchemical, detailed paintings dreamed onto glass.

The goal of Raypainting was the "poetry of light," a visual frottage and mimicry where the projected image and the material characteristics of the carrier surface (building, landscape) created a new quality.

Significant Raypainting projects

- 1996: Jeff Mills at Katakomben, Zürich (Switzerland)
- 1997: Swiss Raid Commando, Colombier (Switzerland)
- 1998: Lake St. Moritz (Gourmet Festival)
- 1999: Hotel Palace, St. Moritz ("La Nuit du Champagne")
- 2000: Millennium, Hotel Palace, St. Moritz (One of Switzerland's largest millennium attractions)
- 2001: Tresor Club, Berlin (10th Anniversary)
- 2001–2002: Matáv Headquarters, Budapest ("Window on the City")
- 2002: Sziget Festival, Light Flood Hangar
- 2003: École nationale supérieure des Beaux-Arts, Paris
- 2004: Millenáris Park, Budapest (EU Accession Ceremony, 20,000 m² projection)
- 2006: Brandenburg Gate, Berlin (The final joint Raypainting project)

=== Light Art Installation (2006–2010) ===
From the mid-2000s, Kozma's interest turned toward a more structured, analytical approach. He moved away from the "cavalcade of colors" of Raypainting and researched the concept of Augmented Space. In his works, the analysis of urban spaces and the deconstruction and reinterpretation of architectural elements played a central role. During this period, he frequently collaborated with other visual artists, including Zsolt Bordos, Zoltán Ferenczi, Béla Hegyi, Ivó Kovács, and Norbert Szabó.

Light Art Installation projects

Major projects include:

- 2006: Leuchtwerke, Essen (Germany) – As part of the 57th Essener Lichtwochen. Covering over 40,000 m² for seven days with daily changing themes (e.g., '56 Revolution, Pécs ECoC, Halloween).
- 2006: Lichtball, Duisburg
- 2006: Eat the Light!, Miksa Róth Memorial House, Long Night of Museums, KÉK, Budapest
- 2006: Palace of Light and Art, Palace of Culture and Science, Warsaw
- 2006: Teve Street Police Palace, Budapest (Altitude Light Signal)
- 2007: Zürich Lichtfest, Lake Zürich
- 2007: mcity / mváros, Hungarian Academy of Sciences, Budapest
- 2007: Vajdahunyad Castle, Budapest (Sputnik Day, Journey on the datascape)
- 2008: Timescan, Lasipalatsi, Helsinki
- 2010: Rolling, GLOW Festival, Eindhoven (Spatial installation created with 21 projectors on the Markt square)

== Later life and death ==
By the end of the decade, he retired from light art creations. His interest turned toward somatics, yoga, and spiritual philosophy, interpreting the body itself as a kind of 3D biotope. He died in November 2023 in Basel at the age of 62.
