= Fernando Enevoldsen =

Argentine alpine skier (born 1965)

Personal information
- Born: 26 March 1965 (age 60); San Carlos de Bariloche, Argentina

Sport
- Sport: Alpine skiing

Fernando Enevoldsen (born 26 March 1965) is an Argentine alpine skier who competed in two events at the 1984 Winter Olympics.
