= Pavlos Fotiadis =

Cypriot alpine skier (born 1964)

Personal information
- Nationality: Cypriot
- Born: 15 November 1964 (age 60); Nicosia, Cyprus

Sport
- Sport: Alpine skiing

Pavlos Fotiadis (born 15 November 1964) is a Cypriot alpine skier. He competed in two events at the 1984 Winter Olympics.
