= Nabil Khalil =

Lebanese alpine skier (born 1962)

Personal information
- Nationality: Lebanese
- Born: 1962 (age 62–63)

Sport
- Sport: Alpine skiing

Nabil Khalil (born 1962) is a Lebanese alpine skier. He competed in two events at the 1984 Winter Olympics.
