= Sotirios Axiotiades =

Lebanese alpine skier (born 1961)

Personal information
- Nationality: Lebanese
- Born: 1961 (age 63–64); Beirut, Lebanon

Sport
- Sport: Alpine skiing

Sotirios Axiotiades (born 1961) is a Lebanese alpine skier. He competed in two events at the 1984 Winter Olympics.
