= Didier Bouvet =

French alpine skier (born 1961)

Personal information
- Born: 6 March 1961 (age 65) Thonon-les-Bains, France

Skiing career
- Sport: Alpine skiing
- Disciplines: Technical events

World Cup
- Wins: 1
- Podiums: 3
Medal record
Men's alpine skiing
Representing France
World Cup race podiums: Event / 1st / 2nd / 3rd; Slalom / 1 / 1 / 1
Olympic Games
Bronze medal – third place	1984 Sarajevo	Slalom

Didier Bouvet (born 6 March 1961) is a French former alpine skier who competed in the 1984 Winter Olympics and in the 1988 Winter Olympics.

== Olympics results ==
In 1984 he won the bronze medal in the slalom event. In the giant slalom competition he finished 14th. Four years later he participated in the 1988 slalom competition but did not finished the race.
