= David Mercer (political commentator) =

American and international political consultant (1961–2021)

David L. Mercer

Personal details
- Born: David L. Mercer; 29 March 1961 Sausalito, California
- Died: 9 December 2021 (aged 60)
- Party: Democratic
- Education: Duke University, Principia College (BA

David L. Mercer (March 29, 1961 – December 9, 2021) was an American political strategist, fundraiser and commentator who appeared regularly on Fox News, France24, SkyNews and other national and international media outlets. He was a longtime member of the Democratic Party.

== Early life ==
Mercer was born on March 29, 1961, in Sausalito, California. In 1979, he graduated from Milton Academy in Massachusetts. He attended Duke University for three years, and finished his final year and received a Bachelor of Arts degree from Principia College, majoring in political science.

== Career ==
Mercer founded Mercer and Associates, a Washington, D.C.–based consulting firm. During his career, he served in numerous media, fundraising and strategic advising roles. In 1992, he did press advance work for the Clinton/Gore campaign. He had served as deputy national finance director for the Democratic National Committee.

In 1996, he was finance director for the DNC's convention. In 2000, he was a trustee for the Gore/Lieberman campaign.

In 2004, he was a member of the Kerry/Edwards campaign leadership council. In 2008, he was a media adviser for the Hillary Clinton presidential campaign.

He appeared regularly on Fox News, CNBC, France24, SkyNews and other media outlets.

In July 2012, Mercer was the victim of theft and a vicious assault in Washington, D.C. that left him near death. He suffered a brain injury, and spent several weeks in a medically induced coma and several months in the hospital before making a full recovery.

== Death ==
Mercer died in December 2021, at the age of 60, following an affliction with cancer. Former President Bill Clinton and former Secretary of State Hillary Clinton released a joint statement, saying, "David was a good and gifted man, who enriched many lives and had much more to give. We hope we can all work to be a little more like him."
