= Zolt Balazs =

Romanian alpine skier (born 1963)

Personal information
- Nationality: Romanian
- Born: 14 January 1963 (age 62); Miercurea Ciuc, Romania

Sport
- Sport: Alpine skiing

Zolt Balazs (born 14 January 1963) is a Romanian alpine skier. He competed in two events at the 1984 Winter Olympics.
