= Giannos Pipis =

Cypriot skier (born 1966)

Personal information
- Nationality: Cypriot
- Born: 25 February 1966 (age 59); Nicosia, Cyprus

Sport
- Sport: Alpine skiing

Giannos Pipis (born 25 February 1966) is a Cypriot alpine skier. He competed in two events at the 1984 Winter Olympics.
