= Philippos Xenophontos =

Cypriot alpine skier (born 1953)

Personal information
- Nationality: Cypriot
- Born: 17 October 1953 (age 72)

Sport
- Sport: Alpine skiing

Philippos Xenophontos (born 17 October 1953) is a Cypriot alpine skier. He competed in two events at the 1980 Winter Olympics.
