= Janez Zibler =

Slovenian alpine skier (born 1958)

Personal information
- Nationality: Slovenian
- Born: 18 February 1958 (age 67); Tržič, Yugoslavia

Sport
- Sport: Alpine skiing

Janez Zibler (born 18 February 1958) is a Slovenian alpine skier. He competed in the men's slalom at the 1980 Winter Olympics, representing Yugoslavia.
