= Wu Deqiang =

Chinese alpine skier (born 1963)

Personal information
- Nationality: Chinese
- Born: 18 February 1963 (age 62); Heilongjiang, China

Sport
- Sport: Alpine skiing

Wu Deqiang (born 18 February 1963) is a Chinese alpine skier. He competed in two events at the 1984 Winter Olympics.
