= Mihai Bîră Jr. =

Romanian alpine skier (born 1961)

Personal information
- Nationality: Romanian
- Born: 8 March 1961 (age 64); Brașov, Romania

Sport
- Sport: Alpine skiing

Mihai Bîră Jr. (born 8 March 1961) is a Romanian alpine skier. He competed in two events at the 1984 Winter Olympics.
