= Hans Kossmann (alpine skier) =

Chilean alpine skier (born 1965)

Personal information
- Born: 5 January 1965 (age 60) Santiago, Chile

Sport
- Sport: Alpine skiing

Hans Kossmann (born 5 January 1965) is a Chilean alpine skier. He competed in three events at the 1984 Winter Olympics.
