= Kim Jin-hae =

South Korean alpine skier (born 1962)

Personal information
- Nationality: South Korean
- Born: 9 April 1962 (age 62)

Sport
- Sport: Alpine skiing

Kim Jin-hae (born 9 April 1962) is a South Korean alpine skier. He competed in three events at the 1984 Winter Olympics.
