= Mario Konzett =

Liechtenstein alpine skier (born 1962)

Mario Konzett (born 4 June 1962) is a Liechtensteiner former alpine skier who competed in the 1984 Winter Olympics.
