= Árni Þór Árnason =

Icelandic alpine skier (born 1961)

Personal information
- Nationality: Icelandic
- Born: 15 January 1961 (age 64); Reykjavík, Iceland

Sport
- Sport: Alpine skiing

Árni Þór Árnason (born 15 January 1961) is an Icelandic alpine skier. He competed in two events at the 1984 Winter Olympics.
