= Khristo Angelov =

Bulgarian alpine skier (born 1961)

Personal information
- Nationality: Bulgarian
- Born: 26 June 1961 (age 63); Borovets, Bulgaria

Sport
- Sport: Alpine skiing

Khristo Angelov (Bulgarian: Христо Ангелов, born 26 June 1961) is a Bulgarian alpine skier. He competed in two events at the 1980 Winter Olympics.
