= Atanas Simidchiev =

Bulgarian cross-country skier (born 1963)

Personal information
- Nationality: Bulgarian
- Born: 13 April 1963 (age 61); Peshtera, Bulgaria

Sport
- Sport: Cross-country skiing

Atanas Simidchiev (Bulgarian: Атанас Симидчиев; born 13 April 1963) is a Bulgarian cross-country skier. He competed at the 1984 Winter Olympics and the 1988 Winter Olympics.
