= Pierre Couquelet =

Belgian alpine skier (born 1964)

Personal information
- Nationality: Belgian
- Born: 7 August 1964 (age 60); Liège, Belgium

Sport
- Sport: Alpine skiing

Pierre Couquelet (born 7 August 1964) is a Belgian alpine skier. He competed in three events at the 1984 Winter Olympics.

He was scheduled to compete as sighted guide for visually impaired para-alpine skier Linda Le Bon at the 2022 Winter Paralympics in Beijing, China. Couquelet was not able to compete as her guide after failing a doping test due to an administrative error related to medication that he takes. He competed as her guide at the 2021 World Para Snow Sports Championships held in Lillehammer, Norway.
