= Yuri Mitev =

Bulgarian biathlete (1958–2022)

Personal information
- Born: 6 February 1958; Stambolovo, Bulgaria
- Died: 11 August 2022 (aged 64)

Sport
- Country: Bulgaria
- Sport: Biathlon

Yuri Mitev (6 February 1958 – 11 August 2022) was a Bulgarian biathlete.

He competed at the 1980 Winter Olympics and the 1984 Winter Olympics.

Mitev died on 11 August 2022, at the age of 64.
