= Nicholas Wilson (alpine skier) =

British alpine skier (born 1960)

Nicholas Wilson (born 9 June 1960 in Quebec City) is a British former alpine skier who competed in the 1984 Winter Olympics.
