= Tony Sukkar (skier) =

Lebanese alpine skier (born 1963)

Personal information
- Nationality: Lebanese
- Born: 1963 (age 61–62)

Sport
- Sport: Alpine skiing

Tony Sukkar (born 1963) is a Lebanese alpine skier. He competed in two events at the 1984 Winter Olympics.
