= Miguel Purcell =

Chilean alpine skier (born 1962)

Personal information
- Born: 26 September 1962 (age 64) Santiago, Chile

Sport
- Sport: Alpine skiing

Miguel Purcell (born 26 September 1962) is a Chilean alpine skier. He competed in three events at the 1984 Winter Olympics.
