= Jordi Torres (alpine skier) =

Andorran alpine skier (born 1964)

Personal information
- Born: 19 July 1964 (age 60); Encamp, Andorra

Sport
- Country: Andorra
- Sport: Alpine skiing

Jordi Torres (born 19 July 1964) is an Andorran alpine skier. He competed in three events at the 1984 Winter Olympics.
