= Eu Woo-youn =

South Korean alpine skier (born 1967)

Personal information
- Nationality: South Korean
- Born: 31 January 1967 (age 58)

Sport
- Sport: Alpine skiing

Eu Woo-youn (born 31 January 1967) is a South Korean alpine skier. He competed in three events at the 1984 Winter Olympics.
