= Svetoslav Atanasov =

Bulgarian cross-country skier (born 1960)

Personal information
- Nationality: Bulgarian
- Born: 4 August 1960 (age 64); Ihtiman, Bulgaria

Sport
- Sport: Cross-country skiing

Svetoslav Atanasov (born 4 August 1960) is a Bulgarian cross-country skier. He competed at the 1984 Winter Olympics and the 1988 Winter Olympics.
