= José Giro =

Spanish cross-country skier (born 1955)

Personal information
- Nationality: Spanish
- Born: 12 November 1955 (age 69)

Sport
- Sport: Cross-country skiing

José Giro (born 12 November 1955) is a Spanish cross-country skier. He competed at the 1980 Winter Olympics, the 1984 Winter Olympics and the 1988 Winter Olympics.
