= Nicolas van Ditmar =

Argentine alpine skier (born 1965)

Personal information
- Born: 30 September 1965 (age 59); Buenos Aires, Argentina

Sport
- Sport: Alpine skiing

Nicolas van Ditmar (born 30 September 1965) is an Argentine alpine skier. He competed in three events at the 1984 Winter Olympics.
