= Klaus Gattermann =

German alpine skier (born 1961)

Klaus Gattermann (born 8 January 1961 in Zwiesel) is a German former alpine skier who competed in the men's downhill at the 1984 Winter Olympics, finishing 12th.
