= Park Byung-ro =

South Korean alpine skier (born 1962)

Personal information
- Nationality: South Korean
- Born: 21 July 1962 (age 62)

Sport
- Sport: Alpine skiing

Park Byung-ro (born 21 July 1962) is a South Korean alpine skier. He competed in three events at the 1984 Winter Olympics.
