= Borislav Kiryakov =

Bulgarian alpine skier (born 1963)

Personal information
- Nationality: Bulgarian
- Born: 30 March 1963 (age 61); Chepelare, Bulgaria

Sport
- Sport: Alpine skiing

Borislav Kiryakov (Bulgarian: Борислав Киряков, born 30 March 1963) is a Bulgarian alpine skier. He competed in two events at the 1984 Winter Olympics.
