= Valentin Gichev =

Bulgarian alpine skier (born 1961)

Personal information
- Nationality: Bulgarian
- Born: 15 January 1961 (age 65) Gabrovo, Bulgaria

Sport
- Sport: Alpine skiing

Valentin Gichev (Bulgarian: Валентин Гичев; born 15 January 1961) is a Bulgarian alpine skier. He competed in two events at the 1984 Winter Olympics.
