= Lazarakis Kekhagias =

Greek alpine skier (born 1961)

Personal information
- Nationality: Greek
- Born: 27 May 1961 (age 63)

Sport
- Sport: Alpine skiing

Lazarakis Kekhagias (born 27 May 1961) is a Greek alpine skier. He competed in two events at the 1980 Winter Olympics.
