= Ali Fuad Haşıl =

Turkish alpine skier (born 1966)

Personal information
- Nationality: Turkish
- Born: 13 March 1966 (age 59); Bursa, Turkey

Sport
- Sport: Alpine skiing

Ali Fuad Haşıl (born 13 March 1966) is a Turkish alpine skier. He competed in two events at the 1984 Winter Olympics.
