= Ioannis Triantafyllidis =

Greek alpine skier (born 1965)

Personal information
- Nationality: Greek
- Born: 7 September 1965 (age 59); Veria, Greece

Sport
- Sport: Alpine skiing

Ioannis Triantafyllidis (born 7 September 1965) is a Greek alpine skier. He competed in two events at the 1984 Winter Olympics.
