= Ong Ching-ming =

Taiwanese alpine skier (born 1968)

Personal information
- Nationality: Taiwanese
- Born: 13 October 1968 (age 58)

Sport
- Sport: Alpine skiing

Ong Ching-ming (born 13 October 1968) is a Taiwanese alpine skier. He competed at the 1984, the 1988 and the 1992 Winter Olympics.
