= Lambros Lambrou (skier) =

Cypriot alpine skier (born 1957)

Personal information
- Born: 10 April 1957 (age 69) Galata, Cyprus
- Height: 1.74 m (5 ft 9 in)
- Weight: 72 kg (159 lb)

Sport
- Sport: Alpine skiing
- Club: Cyprus Ski Club

Lambros Lambrou (Λάμπρος Λάμπρου, born 10 April 1957) is a retired alpine skier from Cyprus. He competed in the slalom and giant slalom at the 1984 Winter Olympics and finished in 41st and 70th place, respectively.
