= David Mercer (alpine skier) =

British alpine skier (born 1960)

David Mercer (born 4 August 1960 in Edinburgh) is a British former alpine skier who competed in the 1984 Winter Olympics.
