= Lyudmil Tonchev =

Bulgarian alpine skier (born 1958)

Personal information
- Nationality: Bulgarian
- Born: 22 June 1958 (age 66); Samokov, Bulgaria

Sport
- Sport: Alpine skiing

Lyudmil Tonchev (Bulgarian: Людмил Тончев, born 22 June 1958) is a Bulgarian alpine skier. He competed in two events at the 1980 Winter Olympics.
