= Luis Fernández Ochoa =

Spanish alpine skier (born 1965)

Luis Fernández Ochoa (born 13 January 1965) is a Spanish former alpine skier who competed in the 1984 Winter Olympics and in the 1988 Winter Olympics.
