= Carlos Salvadores =

Spanish alpine skier (born 1960)

Carlos Salvadores (born 27 December 1960) is a Spanish former alpine skier who competed in the 1984 Winter Olympics.
