= Jorge Pérez (alpine skier) =

Spanish alpine skier (born 1961)

Jorge Pérez (born 7 September 1961) is a Spanish former alpine skier who competed in the 1980 Winter Olympics and in the 1984 Winter Olympics.

== See also ==
- Skiing sport in Spain
