= Andreas Pantelidis =

Greek alpine skier (born 1962)

Personal information
- Nationality: Greek
- Born: 26 May 1962 (age 62); Veria, Greece

Sport
- Sport: Alpine skiing

Andreas Pantelidis (born 26 May 1962) is a Greek alpine skier. He competed in three events at the 1984 Winter Olympics.
