= Shinya Chiba =

Japanese alpine skier (born 1961)

Shinya Chiba (born 12 December 1961) is a Japanese former alpine skier who competed in the 1984 Winter Olympics and 1988 Winter Olympics. His best Olympic finish was an 11th place in the 1988 downhill.
