= Mitko Khadzhiev =

Bulgarian alpine skier (born 1961)

Mitko Khadzhiev (Bulgarian: Митко Хаджиев) (born 24 February 1961 in Chepelare) is a Bulgarian former alpine skier who competed in the 1980 Winter Olympics and 1984 Winter Olympics.
