= Giannis Stamatiou =

Greek alpine skier (born 1962)

Personal information
- Nationality: Greek
- Born: 9 July 1962 (age 64) Athens, Greece

Sport
- Sport: Alpine skiing

Giannis Stamatiou (born 9 July 1962) is a Greek alpine skier. He competed at the 1980, 1984 and the 1988 Winter Olympics.
