= Lazaros Arkhontopoulos =

Greek alpine skier (born 1958)

Personal information
- Nationality: Greek
- Born: 18 July 1958 (age 68) Thessaloniki, Greece

Sport
- Sport: Alpine skiing

Lazaros Arkhontopoulos (born 18 July 1958) is a Greek alpine skier. He competed at the 1980 Winter Olympics and the 1984 Winter Olympics.
