= Alpine skiing at the 1984 Winter Olympics =

Alpine skiing at the XIV Olympic Winter Games
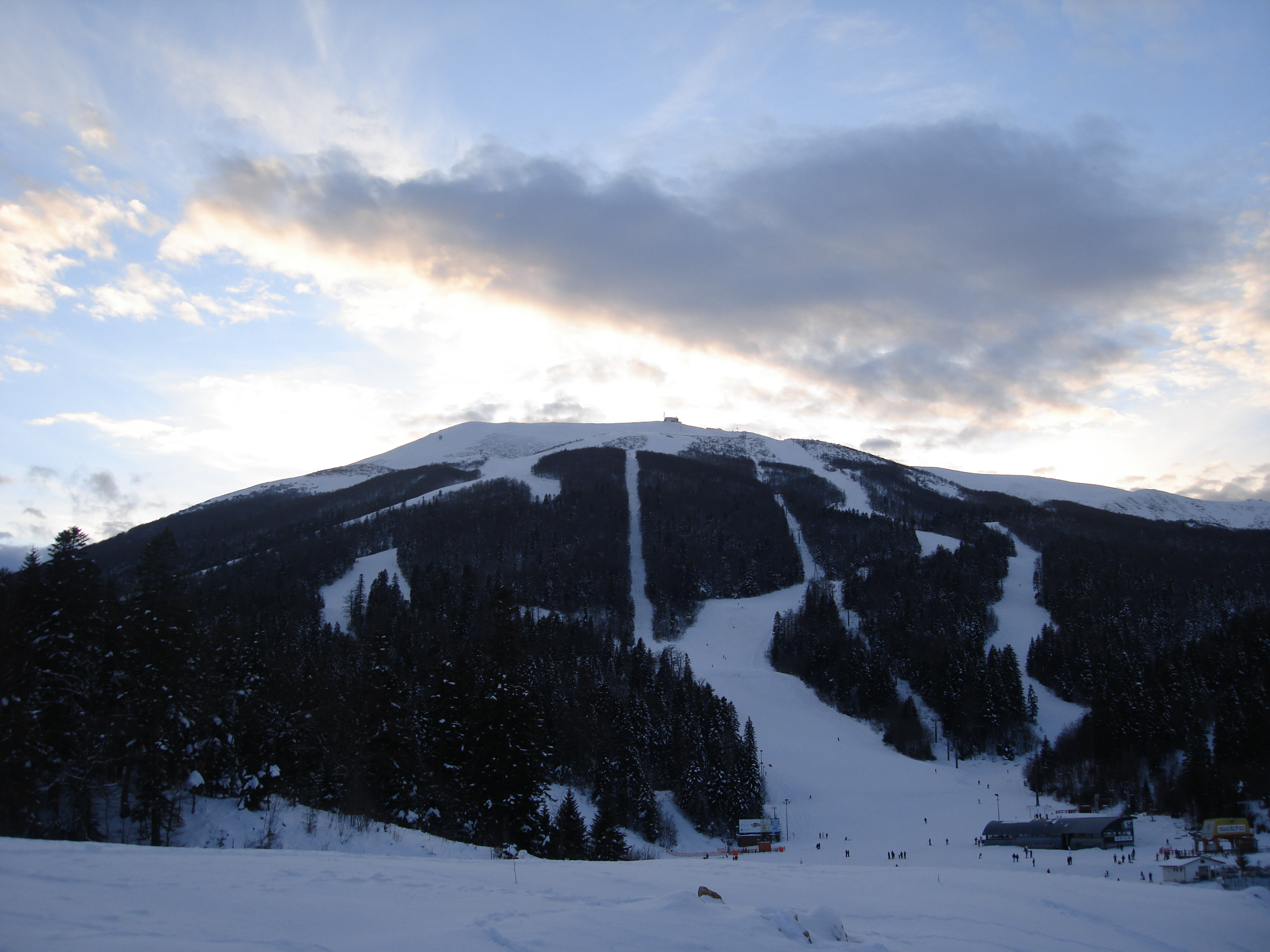
- Bjelašnica
- Venue: Bjelašnica (men), Jahorina (women), SR of Bosnia and Herzegovina, Yugoslavia
- Dates: 13–19 February 1984
- No. of events: 6
- Competitors: 225 from 42 nations

Alpine skiing at the 1984 Winter Olympics consisted of six alpine skiing events, held 13–19 February in Sarajevo, Yugoslavia. The men's races were at Bjelašnica and the women's at Jahorina. Due to weather delays (a blizzard), both downhill races were postponed several days and run after the giant slalom races.

This was the first Winter Olympics since 1936 which did not also serve as the world championships for alpine skiing. It was the last Olympic program with just six events for alpine skiing; ten events were held in 1988 with the return of the combined event and the addition of Super G.

Banned from competition at these Olympics by the International Ski Federation (FIS) were top World Cup racers Ingemar Stenmark of Sweden and Hanni Wenzel of Liechtenstein, both double gold medalists at the 1980 Winter Olympics and leading the World Cup in 1984. They had accepted promotional payments directly, rather than through their national ski federations. Also absent was Marc Girardelli, who had not yet gained his citizenship from Luxembourg and was not allowed to compete for his native Austria.

== Medal summary ==
Eight nations won medals in alpine skiing, and the United States led the medal table with three gold and two silver. France's Perrine Pelen was the only racer to win multiple medals, taking a silver and a bronze.

Host nation Yugoslavia won its first alpine medal in the Winter Olympics with Jure Franko's silver in the men's giant slalom. Czechoslovakia's medal, won by Olga Charvátová in the women's downhill, was its only Olympic medal ever won in alpine skiing.

=== Medal table ===
Rank	Nation	Gold	Silver	Bronze	Total
1	United States	3	2	0	5
2	Switzerland	2	2	0	4
3	Italy	1	0	0	1
4	France	0	1	2	3
5	Yugoslavia	0	1	0	1
6	Liechtenstein	0	0	2	2
7	Austria	0	0	1	1
7	Czechoslovakia	0	0	1	1
Totals (8 entries)		6	6	6	18

=== Men's events ===
Event	Gold		Silver		Bronze	
Downhill	Bill Johnson; United States	1:45.59	Peter Müller; Switzerland	1:45.86	Anton Steiner; Austria	1:45.95
Giant slalom	Max Julen; Switzerland	2:41.18	Jure Franko; Yugoslavia	2:41.41	Andreas Wenzel; Liechtenstein	2:41.75
Slalom	Phil Mahre; United States	1:39.41	Steve Mahre; United States	1:39.62	Didier Bouvet; France	1:40.20

=== Women's events ===
Event	Gold		Silver		Bronze	
Downhill	Michela Figini; Switzerland	1:13.36	Maria Walliser; Switzerland	1:13.41	Olga Charvátová; Czechoslovakia	1:13.53
Giant slalom	Debbie Armstrong; United States	2:20.98	Christin Cooper; United States	2:21.38	Perrine Pelen; France	2:21.40
Slalom	Paola Magoni; Italy	1:36.47	Perrine Pelen; France	1:37.38	Ursula Konzett; Liechtenstein	1:37.50

== Course information ==
Date	Race	Start Elevation	Finish Elevation	Vertical Drop	Course Length	Average Gradient
Thu 16-Feb	Downhill – men	2,076 m (6,811 ft)	1,273 m (4,177 ft)	803 m (2,635 ft)	3.066 km (1.905 mi)	26.2%
Thu 16-Feb	Downhill – women	1,872 m (6,142 ft)	1,325 m (4,347 ft)	547 m (1,795 ft)	1.965 km (1.221 mi)	27.8%
Tue 14-Feb	Giant slalom – men	1,745 m (5,725 ft)	1,363 m (4,472 ft)	382 m (1,253 ft)		
Mon 13-Feb	Giant slalom – women	1,665 m (5,463 ft)	1,328 m (4,357 ft)	337 m (1,106 ft)		
Sun 19-Feb	Slalom – men	1,563 m (5,128 ft)	1,363 m (4,472 ft)	200 m (656 ft)		
Fri 17-Feb	Slalom – women	1,840 m (6,037 ft)	1,670 m (5,479 ft)	170 m (558 ft)		

== Participating nations ==
Forty-two nations sent alpine skiers to compete in the events in Sarajevo. Egypt, Mexico, Monaco and Senegal made their Olympic alpine skiing debuts. Below is a list of the competing nations; in parentheses are the number of national competitors.

- Andorra (2)
- Argentina (10)
- Australia (3)
- Austria (13)
- Belgium (3)
- Bolivia (3)
- Bulgaria (4)
- Canada (11)
- Chile (4)
- China (5)
- Costa Rica (2)
- Cyprus (5)
- Egypt (1)
- Spain (5)
- France (14)
- West Germany (12)
- Great Britain (8)
- Greece (4)
- Hungary (1)
- Iceland (3)
- Italy (12)
- Japan (4)
- South Korea (3)
- Lebanon (4)
- Liechtenstein (8)
- Morocco (4)
- Mexico (1)
- Monaco (1)
- Norway (1)
- New Zealand (6)
- Poland (3)
- Romania (3)
- Senegal (1)
- San Marino (2)
- Switzerland (13)
- Sweden (8)
- Czechoslovakia (4)
- Chinese Taipei (2)
- Turkey (4)
- Soviet Union (4)
- United States (11)
- Yugoslavia (13)

== See also ==
- Alpine skiing at the 1984 Winter Paralympics
