= Alpine skiing at the 1976 Winter Olympics – Women's downhill =

Women's Downhill at the XII Olympic Winter Games
- Alpine skiing
- Venue: Axamer Lizum
- Date: February 8, 1976
- Competitors: 38 from 15 nations
- Winning time: 1:46.16

Medalists
1st place, gold medalist(s)		Rosi Mittermaier	West Germany
2nd place, silver medalist(s)		Brigitte Totschnig	Austria
3rd place, bronze medalist(s)		Cindy Nelson	United States

Women's Downhill
- Location: Axamer Lizum
- Vertical: 700 m (2,297 ft)
- Top elevation: 2,310 m (7,579 ft)
- Base elevation: 1,610 m (5,282 ft)

The Women's downhill competition of the Innsbruck 1976 Olympics was held at Axamer Lizum on Sunday, 8 February.

The defending world champion was Annemarie Moser-Pröll of Austria, who was also the defending World Cup downhill champion, but spent this year away from racing to care for her ailing father; Switzerland's Bernadette Zurbriggen led the current season. Defending Olympic champion Marie-Theres Nadig was entered in the race but did not start.

Rosi Mittermaier won the gold medal, Brigitte Totschnig of Austria took the silver, and Cindy Nelson of the United States was the bronze medalist. Mittermaier also won the slalom and was the runner-up in the giant slalom.

The starting gate was at an elevation of 2,310 m (7,579 ft) above sea level, with a vertical drop of 700 m (2,297 ft). The course length was 2.515 km (1.56 mi) and Mittermaier's winning run of 106.16 seconds resulted in an average speed of 85.286 km/h (53.0 mph), with an average vertical descent rate of 6.594 m/s (21.6 ft/s).

== Results ==
Sunday, February 8, 1976

Rank	Bib	Name	Country	Time	Difference
1st place, gold medalist(s)	9	Rosi Mittermaier	West Germany	1:46.16	—
2nd place, silver medalist(s)	7	Brigitte Totschnig	Austria	1:46.68	+0.52
3rd place, bronze medalist(s)	10	Cindy Nelson	United States	1:47.50	+1.34
4	13	Nicola Spieß	Austria	1:47.71	+1.55
5	5	Danièle Debernard	France	1:48.48	+2.32
6	4	Jacqueline Rouvier	France	1:48.58	+2.42
7	2	Bernadette Zurbriggen	Switzerland	1:48.62	+2.46
8	3	Marlies Oberholzer	Switzerland	1:48.68	+2.52
9	14	Monika Kaserer	Austria	1:48.81	+2.65
10	8	Irene Epple	West Germany	1:48.91	+2.75
11	15	Hanni Wenzel	Liechtenstein	1:49.17	+3.01
12	1	Irmgard Lukasser	Austria	1:49.18	+3.02
13	11	Evi Mittermaier	West Germany	1:49.23	+3.07
14	26	Susan Patterson	United States	1:49.37	+3.21
15	19	Paola Hofer	Italy	1:49.60	+3.44
16	20	Laurie Kreiner	Canada	1:49.97	+3.81
17	18	Michèle Jacot	France	1:49.98	+3.82
18	6	Doris de Agostini	Switzerland	1:50.46	+4.30
19	16	Kathy Kreiner	Canada	1:50.48	+4.32
20	30	Wanda Bieler	Italy	1:50.58	+4.42
21	23	Fabienne Serrat	France	1:51.34	+5.18
22	27	Betsy Clifford	Canada	1:51.40	+5.24
23	25	Maria Epple	West Germany	1:51.41	+5.25
24	24	Ursula Konzett	Liechtenstein	1:51.53	+5.37
25	21	Jolanda Plank	Italy	1:52.50	+6.34
26	29	Leslie Smith	United States	1:52.98	+6.82
27	28	Torill Fjeldstad	Norway	1:52.99	+6.83
28	36	Alla Askarova	Soviet Union	1:53.19	+7.03
29	17	Valentina Iliffe	Great Britain	1:53.31	+7.15
30	22	Riitta Ollikka	Finland	1:53.85	+7.69
31	34	Sally Rodd	Australia	1:54.82	+8.66
32	33	Dagmar Kuzmanová	Czechoslovakia	1:54.81	+8.65
33	32	Jana Šoltýsová	Czechoslovakia	1:55.02	+8.86
34	35	Fiona Easdale	Great Britain	1:57.66	+11.50
35	37	Hazel Hutcheon	Great Britain	1:58.33	+12.17
36	38	Joanne Henke	Australia	1:59.59	+13.43
37	31	Theresa Wallis	Great Britain	1:59.77	+13.61
38	40	Sue Gibson	New Zealand	2:03.49	+17.33
	12	Marie-Theres Nadig	Switzerland	DNS	
	39	Janet Wells	New Zealand	DNS	
