= Great Britain at the 1980 Winter Olympics =

- Flag of the United Kingdom
- IOC code: GBR
- NOC: British Olympic Association

in Lake Placid
- Competitors: 48 (36 men, 12 women) in 7 sports
- Flag bearer: Jeremy Palmer-Tomkinson
- Medals: Gold 1 Silver 0 Bronze 0 Total 1

Winter Olympics appearances (overview)
- 1924; 1928; 1932; 1936; 1948; 1952; 1956; 1960; 1964; 1968; 1972; 1976; 1980; 1984; 1988; 1992; 1994; 1998; 2002; 2006; 2010; 2014; 2018; 2022; 2026

The United Kingdom of Great Britain and Northern Ireland competed as Great Britain at the 1980 Winter Olympics in Lake Placid, United States.

== Medallists ==
Medal	Name	Sport	Event
Gold	Robin Cousins	Figure skating	Men's singles

== Alpine skiing ==
Men

Athlete	Event	Race 1		Race 2		Total	
Athlete	Event	Time	Rank	Time	Rank	Time	Rank
Alan Stewart	Downhill					1:53.41	30
David Cargill	Downhill					1:52.02	29
Ross Blyth	Downhill					1:51.12	28
Konrad Bartelski	Downhill					1:48.53	12
Roddy Langmuir	Giant Slalom	DNF	–	–	–	DNF	–
Ross Blyth	Giant Slalom	1:29.21	46	1:30.89	43	3:00.10	43
Konrad Bartelski	Giant Slalom	1:27.71	43	1:29.99	41	2:57.70	39
Alan Stewart	Giant Slalom	1:25.53	38	1:27.42	35	2:52.95	33
Alan Stewart	Slalom	DNF	–	–	–	DNF	–
Roddy Langmuir	Slalom	DNF	–	–	–	DNF	–
Konrad Bartelski	Slalom	DNF	–	–	–	DNF	–
Ross Blyth	Slalom	1:04.14	34	59.42	28	2:03.56	28

Women

Athlete	Event	Race 1		Race 2		Total	
Athlete	Event	Time	Rank	Time	Rank	Time	Rank
Valentina Iliffe	Downhill					1:43.28	25
Moira Cargill	Downhill					1:42.82	24
Valentina Iliffe	Giant Slalom	1:23.33	34	1:39.43	31	3:02.76	31
Anne Robb	Giant Slalom	1:20.79	32	1:35.29	27	2:56.08	27
Kirstin Cairns	Slalom	DNF	–	–	–	DNF	–
Anne Robb	Slalom	DNF	–	–	–	DNF	–
Valentina Iliffe	Slalom	48.88	22	49.68	16	1:38.56	16

== Biathlon ==
Men

Event	Athlete	Misses ^{1}	Time	Rank
10 km Sprint	Paul Gibbins	5	38:44.24	42
10 km Sprint	Jim Wood	4	38:30.09	40
10 km Sprint	Keith Oliver	2	35:45.89	20

Event	Athlete	Time	Penalties	Adjusted time ^{2}	Rank
20 km	Graeme Ferguson	1'12:53.98	7	1'19:53.98	33
20 km	Jim Wood	1'12:45.37	3	1'15:45.37	25
20 km	Keith Oliver	1'12:02.30	2	1'14:02.30	16

Men's 4 x 7.5 km relay

Athletes	Race		
Athletes	Misses ^{1}	Time	Rank
Graeme Ferguson; Keith Oliver; Jim Wood; Paul Gibbins	2	1'42:10.59	12

^{1} A penalty loop of 150 metres had to be skied per missed target.
^{2} One minute added per close miss (a hit in the outer ring), two minutes added per complete miss.

== Bobsleigh ==
Sled	Athletes	Event	Run 1		Run 2		Run 3		Run 4		Total	
Sled	Athletes	Event	Time	Rank	Time	Rank	Time	Rank	Time	Rank	Time	Rank
GBR-1	Jonnie Woodall; John Howell	Two-man	1:04.12	15	1:04.12	10	1:03.65	11	1:04.03	13	4:15.92	10
GBR-2	Roger Potter; Michael Pugh	Two-man	1:04.93	20	1:04.77	17	1:04.40	18	1:04.47	17	4:18.57	17

Sled	Athletes	Event	Run 1		Run 2		Run 3		Run 4		Total	
Sled	Athletes	Event	Time	Rank	Time	Rank	Time	Rank	Time	Rank	Time	Rank
GBR-1	Jonnie Woodall; Tony Wallington; Corrie Brown; John Howell	Four-man	1:01.44	11	1:01.42	10	1:00.98	11	1:01.08	7	4:04.92	9
GBR-2	Jackie Price; Gomer Lloyd; Andrew Ogilvy-Wedderburn; Nick Phipps	Four-man	1:01.79	16	1:01.90	15	1:02.11	16	1:01.89	15	4:07.69	15

== Cross-country skiing ==
Men

Event	Athlete	Race	
Event	Athlete	Time	Rank
15 km	Philip Jacklin	52:14.17	57
15 km	Michael Goode	49:47.20	52
15 km	Charles MacIvor	48:37.57	49

== Figure skating ==
Men

Athlete	CF	SP	FS	Points	Places	Rank
Christopher Howarth	16	15	15	145.66	134	15
Robin Cousins	4	1	1	189.48	13	1st place, gold medalist(s)

Women

Athlete	CF	SP	FS	Points	Places	Rank
Karena Richardson	10	9	4	168.94	109	12

Pairs

Athletes	SP	FS	Points	Places	Rank
Susan Garland; Robert Daw	11	10	124.36	91	10

Ice Dancing

Athletes	CD	FD	Points	Places	Rank
Karen Barber; Nicky Slater	12	12	176.92	104	12
Jayne Torvill; Christopher Dean	5	5	197.12	42	5

== Luge ==
Men

Athlete	Run 1		Run 2		Run 3		Run 4		Total	
Athlete	Time	Rank	Time	Rank	Time	Rank	Time	Rank	Time	Rank
Neil Townshend	46.726	27	45.358	14	45.037	11	45.278	14	3:02.399	16
Derek Prentice	45.502	24	45.880	18	46.425	22	46.715	20	3:04.522	22
Jeremy Palmer-Tomkinson	45.191	18	46.947	22	45.060	12	45.066	13	3:02.264	15

(Men's) Doubles

Athletes	Run 1		Run 2		Total	
Athletes	Time	Rank	Time	Rank	Time	Rank
Derek Prentice; Christopher Dyason	40.705	14	41.862	15	1:22.567	14
Jeremy Palmer-Tomkinson; John Denby	42.406	18	48.493	19	1:30.899	19

Women

Athlete	Run 1		Run 2		Run 3		Run 4		Total	
Athlete	Time	Rank	Time	Rank	Time	Rank	Time	Rank	Time	Rank
Avril Walker	52.277	26	42.852	25	DNF	–	–	–	DNF	–
Joanna Weaver	40.881	22	41.201	23	41.167	20	42.032	23	2:45.281	23

== Speed skating ==
Men

Event	Athlete	Race	
Event	Athlete	Time	Rank
500 m	Archie Marshall	DSQ	–
1000 m	Archie Marshall	2:00.93	40
1500 m	Alan Luke	2:17.79	34
1500 m	Geoff Sandys	2:15.06	33
5000 m	Geoff Sandys	8:01.09	28
5000 m	John French	7:59.62	27
5000 m	Alan Luke	7:52.65	26
10,000 m	John French	16:17.56	24

Women

Event	Athlete	Race	
Event	Athlete	Time	Rank
500 m	Kim Ferran	47.25	30
1000 m	Mandy Horsepool	1:36.31	37
1000 m	Kim Ferran	1:34.19	35
1500 m	Kim Ferran	DSQ	–
1500 m	Mandy Horsepool	2:23.05	28
3000 m	Mandy Horsepool	5:08.78	26
