= Alpine skiing at the 1976 Winter Olympics – Women's giant slalom =

Women's giant slalom at the XII Olympic Winter Games
- Alpine skiing
- Venue: Axamer Lizum
- Date: February 13, 1976
- Competitors: 45 from 17 nations
- Winning time: 1:29.13

Medalists
1st place, gold medalist(s)		Kathy Kreiner	Canada
2nd place, silver medalist(s)		Rosi Mittermaier	West Germany
3rd place, bronze medalist(s)		Danièle Debernard	France

Women's Giant Slalom
- Location: Hoadl-Mittelstation; Axamer Lizum
- Vertical: 385 m (1,263 ft)
- Top elevation: 1,925 m (6,316 ft)
- Base elevation: 1,540 m (5,052 ft)
- Longest run: 1.225 km (0.76 mi)

The Women's giant slalom competition of the Innsbruck 1976 Olympics was held at Axamer Lizum on Friday, 13 February.

The defending world champion was Fabienne Serrat of France, while Austria's Annemarie Moser-Pröll was the defending World Cup giant slalom champion and Switzerland's Lise-Marie Morerod led the 1976 World Cup.

== Results ==
Rank	Bib	Name	Country	Time	Difference
1st place, gold medalist(s)	1	Kathy Kreiner	Canada	1:29.13	—
2nd place, silver medalist(s)	4	Rosi Mittermaier	West Germany	1:29.25	+0.12
3rd place, bronze medalist(s)	12	Danièle Debernard	France	1:29.95	+0.82
4	8	Lise-Marie Morerod	Switzerland	1:30.40	+1.27
5	10	Marie-Theres Nadig	Switzerland	1:30.44	+1.31
6	11	Monika Kaserer	Austria	1:30.49	+1.36
7	21	Wilma Gatta	Italy	1:30.51	+1.38
8	16	Evi Mittermaier	West Germany	1:30.64	+1.51
9	19	Dagmar Kuzmanová	Czechoslovakia	1:30.69	+1.56
10	25	Jacqueline Rouvier	France	1:30.79	+1.66
11	9	Patricia Emonet	France	1:31.21	+2.08
12	13	Lindy Cochran	United States	1:31.33	+2.20
13	6	Claudia Giordani	Italy	1:31.44	+2.31
13	2	Michèle Jacot	France	1:31.44	+2.31
15	7	Irene Epple	West Germany	1:31.46	+2.33
16	23	Brigitte Totschnig	Austria	1:31.48	+2.35
17	18	Mary Seaton	United States	1:31.58	+2.45
18	22	Ursula Konzett	Liechtenstein	1:31.59	+2.46
19	20	Regina Sackl	Austria	1:31.78	+2.65
20	3	Hanni Wenzel	Liechtenstein	1:31.83	+2.70
21	15	Cindy Nelson	United States	1:32.02	+2.89
22	14	Betsy Clifford	Canada	1:32.61	+3.48
23	29	Paola Hofer	Italy	1:32.67	+3.54
24	26	Maria Epple	West Germany	1:33.02	+3.89
25	32	Jana Gantnerová-Šoltýsová	Czechoslovakia	1:34.00	+4.87
26	17	Marlies Oberholzer	Switzerland	1:34.09	+4.96
27	28	Laurie Kreiner	Canada	1:34.53	+5.40
28	24	Leslie Smith	United States	1:34.54	+5.41
29	30	Irmgard Lukasser	Austria	1:35.38	+6.25
30	71	Valentina Iliffe	Great Britain	1:35.48	+6.35
31	33	Torill Fjeldstad	Norway	1:36.00	+6.87
32	35	Alla Askarova	Soviet Union	1:36.86	+7.73
33	34	Sally Rodd	Australia	1:37.52	+8.39
34	31	Riitta Ollikka	Finland	1:40.15	+11.02
35	45	Jórunn Viggósdóttir	Iceland	1:40.81	+11.68
36	44	Steinunn Sæmundsdóttir	Iceland	1:41.07	+11.94
37	36	Fiona Easdale	Great Britain	1:41.09	+11.96
38	40	Theresa Wallis	Great Britain	1:41.66	+12.53
39	38	Serena Iliffe	Great Britain	1:45.09	+15.96
40	39	Joanne Henke	Australia	1:45.40	+16.27
41	43	Janet Wells	New Zealand	1:48.42	+19.29
42	41	Sue Gibson	New Zealand	1:49.30	+20.17
43	42	Farida Rahmeh	Lebanon	2:11.08	+41.95
-	37	Wanda Bieler	Italy	DNF	-
-	5	Bernadette Zurbriggen	Switzerland	DNF	-
