= Alpine skiing at the 1976 Winter Olympics – Women's slalom =

Women's slalom at the XII Olympic Winter Games
- Alpine skiing
- Venue: Axamer Lizum
- Date: February 11, 1976
- Competitors: 42 from 31 nations
- Winning time: 1:30.54

Medalists
| 1st place, gold medalist(s) | | Rosi Mittermaier | West Germany |
| 2nd place, silver medalist(s) | | Claudia Giordani | Italy |
| 3rd place, bronze medalist(s) | | Hanni Wenzel | Liechtenstein |

Women's Slalom
- Location: Axamer Lizum
- Vertical: 175 m (574 ft)
- Top elevation: 1,785 m (5,856 ft)
- Base elevation: 1,610 m (5,282 ft)

The Women's slalom competition of the Innsbruck 1976 Olympics was held at Axamer Lizum.

The defending world champion was Hanni Wenzel of Liechtenstein, while Switzerland's Lise-Marie Morerod was the defending World Cup slalom champion and Germany's Rosi Mittermaier was the leader of the 1976 World Cup.

== Results ==
| Rank | Name | Country | Run 1 | Run 2 | Total | Difference |
|---|---|---|---|---|---|---|
| 1st place, gold medalist(s) | Rosi Mittermaier | West Germany | 0:46.77 | 0:43.77 | 1:30.54 | - |
| 2nd place, silver medalist(s) | Claudia Giordani | Italy | 0:46.87 | 0:44.00 | 1:30.87 | +0.33 |
| 3rd place, bronze medalist(s) | Hanni Wenzel | Liechtenstein | 0:47.75 | 0:44.45 | 1:32.20 | +1.66 |
| 4 | Danièle Debernard | France | 0:46.86 | 0:45.38 | 1:32.24 | +1.70 |
| 5 | Pamela Behr | West Germany | 0:46.68 | 0:45.63 | 1:32.31 | +1.77 |
| 6 | Lindy Cochran | United States | 0:47.96 | 0:45.28 | 1:33.24 | +2.70 |
| 7 | Christa Zechmeister | West Germany | 0:48.20 | 0:45.52 | 1:33.72 | +3.18 |
| 8 | Wanda Bieler | Italy | 0:48.86 | 0:46.80 | 1:35.66 | +5.12 |
| 9 | Dagmar Kuzmanová | Czechoslovakia | 0:48.62 | 0:47.08 | 1:35.70 | +5.16 |
| 10 | Mary Seaton | United States | 0:49.04 | 0:46.83 | 1:35.87 | +5.33 |
| 11 | Ursula Konzett | Liechtenstein | 0:48.82 | 0:47.53 | 1:36.35 | +5.81 |
| 12 | Bernadette Zurbriggen | Switzerland | 0:49.78 | 0:47.40 | 1:37.18 | +6.64 |
| 13 | Cindy Nelson | United States | 0:49.52 | 0:47.81 | 1:37.33 | +6.79 |
| 14 | Laurie Kreiner | Canada | 0:50.26 | 0:49.12 | 1:39.38 | +8.84 |
| 15 | Valentina Iliffe | Great Britain | 0:51.65 | 0:48.49 | 1:40.14 | +9.60 |
| 16 | Steinunn Sæmundsdóttir | Iceland | 0:53.55 | 0:51.17 | 1:44.72 | +14.18 |
| 17 | Riitta Ollikka | Finland | 0:54.23 | 0:51.39 | 1:45.62 | +15.08 |
| 18 | Fiona Easdale | Great Britain | 0:54.12 | 0:52.88 | 1:47.00 | +16.46 |
| 19 | Sue Gibson | New Zealand | 1:02.59 | 1:00.94 | 2:03.53 | +32.99 |
| - | Patricia Emonet | France | 0:47.47 | DNF | - | - |
| - | Betsy Clifford | Canada | 0:49.09 | DNF | - | - |
| - | Brigitte Totschnig | Austria | 0:49.17 | DNF | - | - |
| - | Monika Berwein | West Germany | 0:49.17 | DNF | - | - |
| - | Michèle Jacot | France | 0:50.00 | DNF | - | - |
| - | Torill Fjeldstad | Norway | 0:50.11 | DNF | - | - |
| - | Abbi Fisher | United States | 0:50.34 | DNS | - | - |
| - | Jana Gantnerová-Šoltýsová | Czechoslovakia | 0:51.34 | DNF | - | - |
| - | Hazel Hutcheon | Great Britain | ? | DNF | - | - |
| - | Nicola Spieß | Austria | ? | DNF | - | - |
| - | Joanne Henke | Australia | DNF | - | - | - |
| - | Jórunn Viggósdóttir | Iceland | DNF | - | - | - |
| - | Paola Hofer | Italy | DNF | - | - | - |
| - | Alla Askarova | Soviet Union | DNF | - | - | - |
| - | Sally Rodd | Australia | DNF | - | - | - |
| - | Regina Sackl | Austria | DNF | - | - | - |
| - | Wilma Gatta | Italy | DNF | - | - | - |
| - | Lise-Marie Morerod | Switzerland | DNF | - | - | - |
| - | Marie-Theres Nadig | Switzerland | DNF | - | - | - |
| - | Monika Kaserer | Austria | DNF | - | - | - |
| - | Fabienne Serrat | France | DNF | - | - | - |
| - | Kathy Kreiner | Canada | DNF | - | - | - |
| - | Anne Robb | Great Britain | DQ | - | - | - |
