= Great Britain at the 1976 Winter Olympics =

- Flag of the United Kingdom
- IOC code: GBR
- NOC: British Olympic Association

in Innsbruck
- Competitors: 42 (31 men, 11 women) in 7 sports
- Flag bearer: John Curry
- Medals: Gold 1 Silver 0 Bronze 0 Total 1

Winter Olympics appearances (overview)
- 1924; 1928; 1932; 1936; 1948; 1952; 1956; 1960; 1964; 1968; 1972; 1976; 1980; 1984; 1988; 1992; 1994; 1998; 2002; 2006; 2010; 2014; 2018; 2022; 2026

The United Kingdom of Great Britain and Northern Ireland competed as Great Britain at the 1976 Winter Olympics in Innsbruck, Austria.

== Medallists ==
Medal	Name	Sport	Event
Gold	John Curry	Figure skating	Men's singles

== Alpine skiing ==
Men

Athlete	Event	Race 1		Race 2		Total	
Athlete	Event	Time	Rank	Time	Rank	Time	Rank
Konrad Bartelski	Downhill					DNF	–
Peter Fuchs	Downhill					1:52.75	37
Stuart Fitzsimmons	Downhill					1:50.89	32
Alan Stewart	Downhill					1:50.56	30
Konrad Bartelski	Giant Slalom	DNF	–	–	–	DNF	–
Peter Fuchs	Giant Slalom	1:56.94	54	DNF	–	DNF	–
Stuart Fitzsimmons	Giant Slalom	1:55.77	51	DNF	–	DNF	–
Alan Stewart	Giant Slalom	1:54.49	44	1:55.15	33	3:49.64	33
Alan Stewart	Slalom	DSQ	–	–	–	DSQ	–
Peter Fuchs	Slalom	DNF	–	–	–	DNF	–
Konrad Bartelski	Slalom	DNF	–	–	–	DNF	–
Stuart Fitzsimmons	Slalom	n/a	?	DNF	–	DNF	–

Women

Athlete	Event	Race 1		Race 2		Total	
Athlete	Event	Time	Rank	Time	Rank	Time	Rank
Theresa Wallis	Downhill					1:59.77	37
Hazel Hutcheon	Downhill					1:58.33	35
Fiona Easdale	Downhill					1:57.66	34
Valentina Iliffe	Downhill					1:53.31	29
Serena Iliffe	Giant Slalom					1:45.09	39
Theresa Wallis	Giant Slalom					1:41.66	38
Fiona Easdale	Giant Slalom					1:41.09	37
Valentina Iliffe	Giant Slalom					1:35.48	30
Anne Robb	Slalom	DSQ	–	53.52	19	DSQ	–
Hazel Hutcheon	Slalom	n/a	27	DNF	–	DNF	–
Fiona Easdale	Slalom	54.12	25	52.88	18	1:47.00	18
Valentina Iliffe	Slalom	51.65	23	48.49	14	1:40.14	15

== Biathlon ==
Men

Event	Athlete	Time	Penalties	Adjusted time ^{1}	Rank
20 km	Jeffrey Stevens	1'18:15.87	9	1'27:15.87	39
20 km	Malcolm Hirst	1'16:52.97	9	1'25:52.97	36
20 km	Graeme Ferguson	1'18:18.09	6	1'24:18.09	29

^{1} One minute added per close miss (a hit in the outer ring), two minutes added per complete miss.

Men's 4 x 7.5 km relay

Athletes	Race		
Athletes	Misses ^{2}	Time	Rank
Malcolm Hirst; Jeffrey Stevens; Paul Gibbins; Graeme Ferguson	8	2'11:54.36	13

^{2} A penalty loop of 200 metres had to be skied per missed target.

== Bobsleigh ==
Sled	Athletes	Event	Run 1		Run 2		Run 3		Run 4		Total	
Sled	Athletes	Event	Time	Rank	Time	Rank	Time	Rank	Time	Rank	Time	Rank
GBR-1	Jackie Price; Gomer Lloyd	Two-man	58.05	19	58.13	19	57.90	18	58.02	17	3:52.10	20
GBR-2	Mark Agar; Michael Sweet	Two-man	58.40	21	58.33	22	57.90	18	58.08	18	3:52.71	21

Sled	Athletes	Event	Run 1		Run 2		Run 3		Run 4		Total	
Sled	Athletes	Event	Time	Rank	Time	Rank	Time	Rank	Time	Rank	Time	Rank
GBR-1	Jackie Price; Colin Campbell; Michael Sweet; Gomer Lloyd	Four-man	56.02	14	56.07	13	56.72	11	57.58	14	3:46.39	13
GBR-2	Mark Agar; Anthony Norton; Graham Sweet; Andrew Ogilvy-Wedderburn	Four-man	57.21	20	56.88	20	57.75	18	58.01	18	3:49.85	20

== Cross-country skiing ==
Men

Event	Athlete	Race	
Event	Athlete	Time	Rank
15 km	Keith Oliver	52:31.00	68
15 km	Douglas Elliott	52:14.27	65
15 km	Paul Gibbins	51:48.02	63

== Figure skating ==
Men

Athlete	CF	SP	FS	Points	Places	Rank
Glyn Jones	19	17	16	157.24	141	16
Robin Cousins	14	11	8	178.14	83	10
John Curry	2	2	1	192.74	11	1st place, gold medalist(s)

Women

Athlete	CF	SP	FS	Points	Places	Rank
Karena Richardson	17	15	14	166.52	137	15

Pairs

Athletes	SP	FS	Points	Places	Rank
Erika Taylforth; Colin Taylforth	10	12	120.40	108	11

Ice Dancing

Athletes	CD	FD	Points	Places	Rank
Kay Barsdell; Kenneth Foster	13	13	175.16	111	12
Janet Thompson; Warren Maxwell	8	8	186.80	78	8
Hilary Green; Glyn Watts	6	7	191.40	57	7

== Luge ==
Men

Athlete	Run 1		Run 2		Run 3		Run 4		Total	
Athlete	Time	Rank	Time	Rank	Time	Rank	Time	Rank	Time	Rank
Jeremy Palmer-Tomkinson	57.056	37	54.881	25	54.959	28	55.828	34	3:42.724	30
Richard Liversedge	56.721	35	55.997	35	55.959	35	56.132	36	3:44.839	33
Michel de Carvalho	56.340	32	55.412	29	55.277	32	55.636	32	3:42.665	29

(Men's) Doubles

Athletes	Run 1		Run 2		Total	
Athletes	Time	Rank	Time	Rank	Time	Rank
Jeremy Palmer-Tomkinson; Michel de Carvalho	46.400	23	44.977	16	1:31.377	20
Richard Liversedge; Russell Tapp	DNF	–	–	–	DNF	–

== Speed skating ==
Men

Event	Athlete	Race	
Event	Athlete	Time	Rank
500 m	Archie Marshall	40.85	16
1000 m	Archie Marshall	1:24.00	21
1500 m	Geoff Sandys	2:09.17	24
5000 m	Geoff Sandys	8:13.03	26
10,000 m	Geoff Sandys	16:26.27	18

== See also ==
- Great Britain at the 1976 Winter Paralympics
