= List of British alpine skiers =

List of alpine skiers

This is a list of notable British alpine skiers.

== A ==
- Chemmy Alcott (born 10 July 1982), 7-times British national overall champion; competed at the 2002, 2006 and 2010 Winter Olympics.
- Ian Appleyard (10 October 1923 – 2 June 1998), competed at the 1948 Winter Olympics.
- Anna Asheshov (born 8 July 1941), competed at the 1964 Winter Olympics.

== B ==
- Konrad Bartelski (born 27 May 1954), finished second in a World Cup downhill race in 1981, and competed at the 1972 and 1976 Winter Olympics.
- Alain Baxter (born 26 December 1973, half-brother of Noel Baxter), seven-time British slalom champion, competed at the 2002 and 2006 Winter Olympics, finishing third in 2002 but subsequently failed a drug test and was stripped of the bronze medal.
- Noel Baxter (born 25 July 1981, half-brother of Alain Baxter), competed at the 2002 Winter Olympics.
- Lesley Beck (born 10 July 1964), finished tenth in the slalom at the world championships in 1987, competed at the 1984 and 1988 Winter Olympics
- Graham Bell (born 4 January 1966, brother of Martin Bell), competed at the 1984, 1988, 1992, 1994 and 1998 Winter Olympics.
- Martin Bell (born 6 December 1964, brother of Graham Bell), finished eighth in the downhill at the 1988 Winter Olympics; also competed at the 1984, 1992 and 1994 Winter Olympics.
- Carol Blackwood, competed at the 1972 Winter Olympics.
- Christopher Blagden, competed at the 1992 Winter Olympics.
- Helen Blane, competed at the 1936 Winter Olympics.
- Ross Blyth, competed at the 1980 Winter Olympics.
- Clare Booth, competed at the 1984 Winter Olympics and the 1988 Winter Olympics.
- David Borradaile, competed at the 1968 Winter Olympics.
- Peter Boumphrey, competed at the 1948 Winter Olympics.
- John Boyagis, competed at the 1948 Winter Olympics and the 1952 Winter Olympics.
- Mick Brennan, competed at the 2014 Winter Paralympics.
- Robin Brock-Hollinshead, competed at the 1956 Winter Olympics.
- Richard Burt, competed at the 1992 Winter Paralympics and the 1994 Winter Paralympics.
- Frederick Burton, competed at the 1984 Winter Olympics.

== C ==
- Fiona Campbell, competed at the 1952 Winter Olympics.
- David Cargill, competed at the 1980 Winter Olympics.
- Moira Cargill, competed at the 1980 Winter Olympics.

== D ==
- Michel de Carvalho, competed at the 1968 Winter Olympics.
- Rupert de Larrinaga, competed at the 1952 Winter Olympics.
- Russell Docker, competed at the 2002 Winter Paralympics, the 2006 Winter Paralympics, and the 2010 Winter Paralympics.
- Edward Drake, competed at the 2010 Winter Olympics.
- Bridget Duke-Wooley, competed at the 1948 Winter Olympics.
- Ronald Duncan, competed at the 1988 Winter Olympics and the 1992 Winter Olympics.
- Birnie Duthie, competed at the 1936 Winter Olympics.

== E ==
- Fiona Easdale, competed at the 1976 Winter Olympics.
- Doreen Elliott, co-founded the Ladies' Ski Club, later becoming its president
- Jade Etherington, competed at the 2014 Winter Paralympics.
- Charlotte Evans, competed at the 2014 Winter Paralympics.

== F ==
- Wendy Farrington, competed at the 1960 Winter Olympics and the 1964 Winter Olympics.
- Felicity Field, competed at the 1968 Winter Olympics.
- Menna Fitzpatrick, competed at the 2018 Winter Paralympics

== G ==
- Kelly Gallagher, competed at the 2010 Winter Paralympics, 2014 Winter Paralympics, and the 2018 Winter Paralympics.
- Josephine Gibbs, competed at the 1960 Winter Olympics.
- Bunty Greenland, competed at the 1948 Winter Olympics.

== H ==
- Gina Hathorn, competed at the 1964 Winter Olympics, 1968 Winter Olympics, and the 1972 Winter Olympics.
- Tania Heald, competed at the 1964 Winter Olympics.
- Renate Holmes, competed at the 1956 Winter Olympics and the 1960 Winter Olympics.
- Hazel Hutcheon (born 18 August 1960), 1977 British women's combined champion, competed at the 1976 Winter Olympics.

== I ==
- Serena Iliffe, competed at the 1976 Winter Olympics.
- Valentina Iliffe, competed at the 1972 Winter Olympics, 1976 Winter Olympics, and the 1980 Winter Olympics.

== K ==
- Jennifer Kehoe, competed at the 2018 Winter Paralympics.
- Jeanette Kessler, competed at the 1936 Winter Olympics.
- Millie Knight, competed at the 2014 Winter Paralympics and the 2018 Winter Paralympics.

== L ==
- Hilary Laing, competed at the 1952 Winter Olympics.
- Wendy Lumby, competed at the 1988 Winter Olympics.
- Peter Lunn, competed at the 1936 Winter Olympics

== M ==
- Sheena Mackintosh, competed at the 1948 Winter Olympics.
- Vora Mackintosh, competed at the 1952 Winter Olympics.

== N ==
- Zandra Nowell, competed at the 1956 Winter Olympics.

== O ==
- Sophie Ormond, competed at the 1998 Winter Olympics.

== P ==
- Claire de Pourtales, competed at the 1992 Winter Olympics and the 1994 Winter Olympics.
- Caroline Powell, competed at the 2014 Winter Paralympics.
- Debbie Pratt, competed at the 1992 Winter Olympics.
- Addie Pryor, competed at the 1956 Winter Olympics.

== R ==
- James Riddell, competed at the 1936 Winter Olympics
- Anne Robb, competed at the 1976 Winter Olympics and the 1980 Winter Olympics.
- Xanthe Ryder, competed at the 1948 Winter Olympics.
- Dave Ryding, won Britain's first-ever World Cup gold medal in the slalom at Kitzbühel in 2022, and competed at the 2010, 2014, and 2018 Winter Olympics.

== S ==
- Audrey Sale-Barker, also a prominent aviator.
- Jeanne Sandford, competed at the 1956 Winter Olympics.
- Rosemary Sparrow, competed at the 1948 Winter Olympics.

== T ==
- Diana Tomkinson, competed at the 1968 Winter Olympics.
- Anna Turney, competed at the 2010 Winter Paralympics and the 2014 Winter Paralympics.

== W ==
- Theresa Wallis, competed at the 1976 Winter Olympics.
- Jocelyn Wardrop-Moore, competed at the 1956 Winter Olympics.
