= Alpine skiing at the 1980 Winter Olympics – Women's downhill =

Women's Downhill at the XIII Olympic Winter Games
- Alpine skiing
- Venue: Whiteface Mountain
- Date: February 17, 1980
- Competitors: 28 from 13 nations
- Winning time: 1:37.52

Medalists
| 1st place, gold medalist(s) | | Annemarie Moser-Pröll | Austria |
| 2nd place, silver medalist(s) | | Hanni Wenzel | Liechtenstein |
| 3rd place, bronze medalist(s) | | Marie-Theres Nadig | Switzerland |

Women's Downhill
- Location: Whiteface Mountain
- Vertical: 700 m (2,297 ft)
- Top elevation: 1,181 m (3,875 ft)
- Base elevation: 481 m (1,578 ft)

The Women's downhill competition of the Lake Placid 1980 Olympics was held at Whiteface Mountain on Sunday, February 17.

The defending world champion was Annemarie Moser-Pröll of Austria, who was also the defending World Cup downhill champion, while Switzerland's Marie-Theres Nadig led the current season. Defending Olympic champion Rosi Mittermaier retired four years earlier.

Moser-Pröll won the gold, Hanni Wenzel of Liechtenstein took the silver, and Nadig was the bronze medalist.

The course started at an elevation of 1,181 m (3,875 ft) above sea level with a vertical drop of 700 m (2,297 ft) and a length of 2.698 km (1.68 mi). Moser-Pröll's winning time was 97.52 seconds, yielding an average speed of 99.598 km/h (61.9 mph), with an average vertical descent rate of 7.178 m/s (23.5 ft/s).

== Results ==
The race was started at 11:30 local time, (UTC −5). At the starting gate, the skies were partly cloudy, the temperature was −14 °C (7 °F), wind speed was 25–40 km/h (16–25 mph), and the snow condition was hard packed.

| Rank | Bib | Name | Country | Time | Difference |
|---|---|---|---|---|---|
| 1st place, gold medalist(s) | 6 | Annemarie Moser-Pröll | Austria | 1:37.52 | — |
| 2nd place, silver medalist(s) | 12 | Hanni Wenzel | Liechtenstein | 1:38.22 | +0.70 |
| 3rd place, bronze medalist(s) | 9 | Marie-Theres Nadig | Switzerland | 1:38.36 | +0.84 |
| 4 | 14 | Heidi Preuss | United States | 1:39.51 | +1.99 |
| 5 | 19 | Kathy Kreiner | Canada | 1:39.53 | +2.01 |
| 6 | 20 | Ingrid Eberle | Austria | 1:39.63 | +2.11 |
| 7 | 22 | Torill Fjeldstad | Norway | 1:39.69 | +2.17 |
| 7 | 11 | Cindy Nelson | United States | 1:39.69 | +2.17 |
| 9 | 18 | Marianne Zechmeister | West Germany | 1:39.96 | +2.44 |
| 10 | 5 | Jana Šoltýsová | Czechoslovakia | 1:40.71 | +3.19 |
| 11 | 4 | Laurie Graham | Canada | 1:40.74 | +3.22 |
| 11 | 2 | Bernadette Zurbriggen | Switzerland | 1:40.74 | +3.22 |
| 13 | 24 | Loni Klettl | Canada | 1:40.95 | +3.43 |
| 14 | 16 | Holly Flanders | United States | 1:40.96 | +3.44 |
| 15 | 23 | Cristina Gravina | Italy | 1:40.99 | +3.47 |
| 16 | 17 | Marie-Luce Waldmeier | France | 1:41.05 | +3.53 |
| 17 | 13 | Evi Mittermaier | West Germany | 1:41.26 | +3.74 |
| 17 | 7 | Doris de Agostini | Switzerland | 1:41.26 | +3.74 |
| 19 | 3 | Irene Epple | West Germany | 1:41.68 | +4.16 |
| 20 | 8 | Annemarie Bischofberger | Switzerland | 1:41.93 | +4.41 |
| 21 | 15 | Monika Bader | West Germany | 1:41.96 | +4.44 |
| 22 | 1 | Cornelia Pröll | Austria | 1:42.44 | +4.92 |
| 23 | 21 | Petra Wenzel | Liechtenstein | 1:42.50 | +4.98 |
| 24 | 25 | Moira Cargill | Great Britain | 1:42.82 | +5.30 |
| 25 | 26 | Valentina Iliffe | Great Britain | 1:43.28 | +5.76 |
| 26 | 27 | Anna Archibald | New Zealand | 1:46.68 | +9.16 |
| 27 | 28 | Farida Rahmed | Lebanon | 2:42.88 | +65.36 |
| - | 10 | Caroline Attia | France | DNF | - |
