= Kathy Kreiner =

Canadian alpine skier

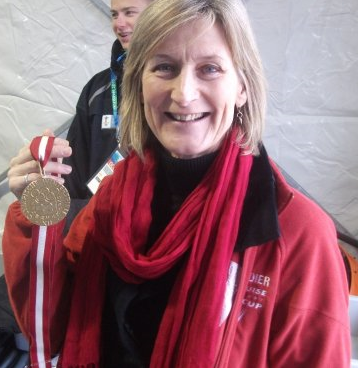
- Kreiner-Phillips in 2010 with her 1976 Olympic gold medal

Personal information
- Born: May 4, 1957 (age 69) Timmins, Ontario, Canada
- Height: 1.73 m (5 ft 8 in)

Skiing career
- Sport: Alpine skiing
- Club: Timmins Ski Club
- Retired: March 1981 (age 23)
- Disciplines: Giant slalom, slalom, Downhill, combined
- World Cup debut: January 18, 1972 (age 14) (first top ten)

Olympics
- Teams: 3 – (1972, 1976, 1980)
- Medals: 1 (1 gold)

World Championships
- Teams: 5 – (1972–1980) includes three Olympics
- Medals: 1 (1 gold)

World Cup
- Seasons: 10 – (1972–1981)
- Wins: 1 – (1 GS)
- Podiums: 7 – (6 GS, 1 DH)
- Overall titles: 0 – (10th in 1974)
- Discipline titles: 0 – (4th in GS, 1977)
Medal record
Women's alpine skiing
Representing Canada
World Cup race podiums
Event	1st	2nd	3rd
Giant slalom	1	2	3
Downhill	0	1	0
Total	1	3	3
Olympic Games
World Championships
Gold medal – first place	1976 Innsbruck	Giant slalom

Katharine Kreiner-Phillips (born May 4, 1957) is a former World Cup alpine ski racer and Olympic gold medalist from Canada.

== Career ==
She won the giant slalom at the 1976 Winter Olympics in Innsbruck, Austria. First out of the gate on Friday the 13th, Kreiner prevented double-gold medalist Rosi Mittermaier from sweeping the women's three alpine events, as Mittermaier won the silver medal. It was Canada's only gold medal in Innsbruck.

Born in Timmins, Ontario, Kreiner was an alpine racing prodigy in Canada, the youngest of six children of Margaret (Peggy) and Harold O. Kreiner (1920–1999), a Timmins physician and her coach until she made the national team. He was the team doctor for the Canadian alpine ski team for the 1966 World Championships in Portillo, Chile, and the Canadian Olympic team for the winter games in 1968 in Grenoble, France.

Kreiner made the national 'B' team at age 13 for a year, and was promoted to the 'A' team in the summer of 1971. She had her first World Cup top ten result in mid-January 1972, a sixth place in a downhill at Grindelwald, Switzerland. Three weeks later, Kreiner placed 14th in the slalom at the 1972 Winter Olympics in Sapporo, Japan. She made her first World Cup podium in 1973 at Alyeska in Alaska in giant slalom, and gained her first and only World Cup victory at age 16 in 1974 at Pfronten, West Germany. Kreiner raced ten seasons on the World Cup circuit and finished with one victory, seven podiums, and 47 top tens. After her Olympic victory, she was named the Canadian Female Athlete of the Year in 1976.

From 1948 to 1980, the Winter Olympics also served as the World Championships for alpine skiing, making the Olympic champion the concurrent world champion. Kreiner was immediately inducted into the Canada's Sports Hall of Fame at age 18, and was also inducted into the Ontario Sports Hall of Fame in 2002.

Kreiner's Olympic win in 1976 surprised even her; she had shipped home most of her items from Innsbruck and had to borrow a uniform for the medal ceremony. Her older sister Laurie was also a World Cup racer and two-time Olympian; she had the 28th starting position (of 43) and had tears of joy for Kathy while still in the starting gate and finished 27th. Laurie had just missed an Olympic medal in 1972 with a fourth place in the giant slalom.

At the 1980 Winter Olympics at Lake Placid, Kreiner finished fifth in the downhill and ninth in the giant slalom, held at Whiteface Mountain. During her final season in 1981, Kreiner ascended her only World Cup podium in downhill, and raced independent of the Canadian national team. Her sixth and final podium in giant slalom came nearly four years earlier at Sun Valley in March 1977.

Kreiner married Dave Phillips, a former freestyle skier with the Canadian national team. As of 2020, she remains the only Olympic gold medallist from Timmins.

== World Cup results ==
=== Season standings ===
Season	Age	Overall	Slalom	Giant Slalom	Super G	Downhill	Combined
1972	14	31	—	—	not run	15	not awarded
1973	15	24	17	12	not run	16	not awarded
1974	16	10	13	8	not run	20	not awarded
1975	17	12	25	8	not run	15	not awarded
1976	18	23	—	8	not run	—	—
1977	19	13	—	4	not run	19	not awarded
1978	20	25	21	18	not run	15	not awarded
1979	21	71	—	—	not run	42	not awarded
1980	22	31	—	20	not run	20	12
1981	23	27	—	30	not run	15	17

Points were only awarded for top ten (through 1979) and top fifteen finishes (see scoring system).

=== Race podiums ===
- 1 win – (1 GS)
- 7 podiums – (6 GS, 1 DH); 47 top tens

Season	Date	Location	Discipline	Place
1973	7 Mar-1973	(United States) Anchorage, AK, USA	Giant slalom	3rd
1974	6 Jan 1974	Pfronten, West Germany	Giant slalom	1st
1975	7 Mar 1975	Garibaldi, BC, Canada	Giant slalom	3rd
1976	(Austria) 1976 Winter Olympics			
1976	19 Mar 1976	Mt. Ste. Anne, QC, Canada	Giant slalom	3rd
1977	20 Jan 1977	Arosa, Switzerland	Giant slalom	2nd
1977	6 Mar 1977	(United States) Sun Valley, ID, USA	Giant slalom	2nd
1981	12 Dec 1980	Val-d'Isère, France	Downhill	2nd

== World Championship results ==
Year	Age	Slalom	Giant Slalom	Super-G	Downhill	Combined
1972	14	14	—	not run	33	—
1974	16	15	DNF	not run	7	—
1976	18	DNF1	1	not run	19	—
1978	20	17	21	not run	12	4
1980	22	15	9	not run	5	4

From 1948 through 1980, the Winter Olympics were also the World Championships for alpine skiing.
At the World Championships from 1954 through 1980, the combined was a "paper race" using the results of the three events (DH, GS, SL).

== Olympic results ==
Year	Age	Slalom	Giant Slalom	Super-G	Downhill	Combined
1972	14	14	—	not run	33	not run
1976	18	DNF1	1	not run	19	not run
1980	22	15	9	not run	5	not run

== Video ==
- Kathy Kreiner-Phillips – 2009 video on YouTube
