= Cindy Nelson =

American alpine skier

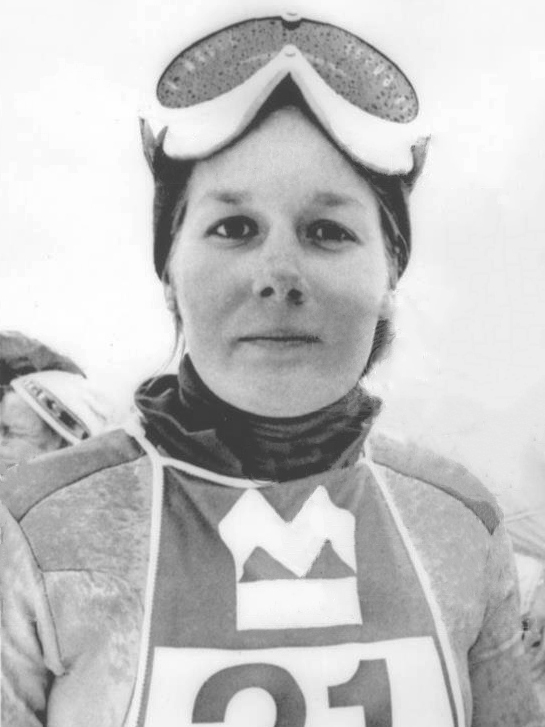
- Nelson in 1975

Personal information
- Born: August 19, 1955 (age 70) Lutsen, Minnesota, U.S.
- Height: 5 ft 6 in (168 cm)

Skiing career
- Sport: Alpine skiing
- Retired: April 1985 (age 29)
- Disciplines: Downhill, giant slalom, slalom, combined, super-G
- World Cup debut: December 1971 (age 16)

Olympics
- Teams: 3 – (1976–84) missed 1972 – hip injury
- Medals: 1 (0 gold)

World Championships
- Teams: 6 – (1974–85) includes 2 Olympics
- Medals: 3 (0 gold)

World Cup
- Seasons: 13 – (1972, '74–85)
- Wins: 6 – (3 DH, 1 SG, 1 GS, 1 K)
- Podiums: 23
- Overall titles: 0 – (4th in 1979)
- Discipline titles: 0 – (2nd in DH, 1978)
Medal record
Women's alpine skiing
Representing the United States
Olympic Games
Bronze medal – third place	1976 Innsbruck	Downhill
World Championships
Silver medal – second place	1980 Lake Placid	Combined
Silver medal – second place	1982 Schladming	Downhill

Cynthia Lee Nelson (born August 19, 1955) is a former World Cup alpine ski racer from the United States.

== Career ==
Born and raised in Lutsen in northeastern Minnesota, Nelson's family ran the local ski area. She was on skis before the age of three. She would eventually race in all five alpine disciplines, with a focus on downhill, joining the World Cup squad of the U.S. Ski Team at age 16. In 1971, Nelson burst onto the international ski racing scene. won the silver medal in the downhill at the 1982 World Championships and was the bronze medalist in the downhill at the 1976 Winter Olympics.

During her first World Cup season, she had two top-15 finishes in the downhill as the 1972 Winter Olympics neared. She was expected to make the U.S. Olympic team, but dislocated a hip in a downhill at Grindelwald on January 18, two weeks before the games began. She missed the Winter Olympics but competed in 1976, 1980, and 1984. Two years after her hip injury, she won her first World Cup race at Grindelwald in 1974, the first-ever American to gain a World Cup victory in downhill. Nelson's only victory in a World Cup giant slalom was also her only win in North America, in the rain at Whistler, British Columbia. She retired from international competition after the 1985 season with six World Cup wins, 26 podiums, and 123 top ten finishes.

== World Cup Results ==
=== Season standings ===
Season	Age	Overall	Slalom	Giant slalom	Super-G	Downhill	Combined
1972	16	—	—	—	not run	—	not awarded
1973	17	—	—	—	not run	—	not awarded
1974	18	15	14	—	not run	—	not awarded
1975	19	8	28	6	not run	4	not awarded
1976	20	8	12	6	not run	7	3
1977	21	19	19	19	not run	10	not awarded
1978	22	5	13	8	not run	2	not awarded
1979	23	4	26	7	not run	4	not awarded
1980	24	10	43	31	not run	4	3
1981	25	8	15	12	not run	7	7
1982	26	5	25	7	not run	7	3
1983	27	7	39	2	not awarded (w/ GS)	25	7
1984	28	41	—	15	not awarded (w/ GS)	—	—
1985	29	48	—	22	not awarded (w/ GS)	34	—

=== Race victories ===
- 6 wins – (3 DH, 1 SG, 1 GS, 1 K)
- 23 podiums – (15 DH, 1 SG, 4 GS, 1 SL, 1 K)

Season	Date	Location	Discipline
1974	January 13, 1974	Grindelwald, Switzerland	Downhill
1975	December 21, 1974	Saalbach, Austria	Downhill
1975	March 1, 1975	Whistler, Canada	Giant slalom
1976	January 9, 1976	Hasliberg, Switzerland	Combined
1979	February 9, 1979	Pfronten, West Germany	Downhill
1983	January 10, 1983	Verbier, Switzerland	Super-G

- Nelson also won an unofficial Super-G race on March 23, 1982, a test event in San Sicario, Italy.

== World Championship results ==
Year	Age	Slalom	Giant slalom	Super-G	Downhill	Combined
1972	16	—	—	not run	—	—
1974	18	11	DNF	not run	18	—
1976	20	13	21	not run	3	4
1978	22	30	15	not run	5	6
1980	24	11	13	not run	7	2
1982	26		16	not run	2	4
1985	29	—	—	not run	25	15

From 1948 through 1980, the Winter Olympics were also the World Championships for alpine skiing.
At the World Championships from 1954 through 1980, the combined was a "paper race" using the results of the three events (DH, GS, SL).

== Olympic results ==
Year	Age	Slalom	Giant slalom	Super-G	Downhill	Combined
1972	16	—	—	not run	—	not run
1976	20	13	21	not run	3	not run
1980	24	11	13	not run	7	not run
1984	28	—	18	not run	—	not run

== Other ==
In 1979, the Supersisters trading card set was produced and distributed; one of the cards featured Nelson's name and picture.

Olympic Games
Preceded by Olga Fikotová	Flagbearer for United States; Innsbruck 1976	Succeeded by Gary Hall Sr.
