= Monika Berwein =

German alpine skier (born 1957)

Monika Berwein (born 31 August 1957 in Garmisch-Partenkirchen) is a German former alpine skier who competed in the women's slalom at the 1976 Winter Olympics.
