= Stuart Fitzsimmons =

British alpine skier (1956–2019)

Personal information
- Nationality: British
- Born: 28 December 1956
- Died: 11 November 2019 (aged 62)

Sport
- Sport: Alpine skiing

Stuart Fitzsimmons (28 December 1956 – 11 November 2019) was a British alpine skier. He competed in three events at the 1976 Winter Olympics.
