= Archie Marshall =

Archie Marshall may refer to:

- Archie Marshall (politician)
- Archie Marshall (basketball)
- Archie Marshall (speed skater)

== See also ==
- Archibald Marshall, English author, publisher and journalist
