= Hanni Wenzel =

Liechtensteiner alpine skier (born 1956)

Personal information
- Born: 14 December 1956 (age 69) Straubing, Bavaria, West Germany
- Height: 1.65 m (5 ft 5 in)
- Website: wwp-group.com

Skiing career
- Sport: Alpine skiing
- Retired: March 1984 (age 27)
- Disciplines: Giant slalom, slalom, combined, downhill, super-G
- World Cup debut: 1 March 1972 (age 15)

Olympics
- Teams: 2 – (1976, 1980)
- Medals: 4 (2 gold)

World Championships
- Teams: 5 – (1974–82) includes two Olympics
- Medals: 9 (4 gold)

World Cup
- Seasons: 13 – (1972–84)
- Wins: 33
- Podiums: 89
- Overall titles: 2 – (1978, 1980)
- Discipline titles: 5 – (2 GS, 1 SL, 2 K)
Medal record
Women's alpine skiing
Representing Liechtenstein
World Cup race podiums
Event	1st	2nd	3rd
Slalom	11	11	10
Giant slalom	12	9	9
Downhill	2	0	3
Super-G	0	1	0
Combined	8	4	9
Total	33	25	31
International competitions
Event	1st	2nd	3rd
Olympic Games	2	1	1
World Championships	4	3	2
Total	6	4	3
Olympic Games
Gold medal – first place	1980 Lake Placid	Giant slalom
Gold medal – first place	1980 Lake Placid	Slalom
Silver medal – second place	1980 Lake Placid	Downhill
Bronze medal – third place	1976 Innsbruck	Slalom
World Championships
Gold medal – first place	1974 St. Moritz	Slalom
Gold medal – first place	1980 Lake Placid	Combined
Silver medal – second place	1974 St. Moritz	Combined
Silver medal – second place	1978 Garmisch	Combined
Bronze medal – third place	1976 Innsbruck	Combined

Hannelore "Hanni" Wenzel (born 14 December 1956) is a retired Liechtensteiner alpine ski racer. Wenzel is a former Olympic, World Cup, and world champion. She won Liechtenstein's first-ever Olympic medal at the 1976 Winter Olympics in Innsbruck, Austria, and its first two Olympic gold medals four years later in Lake Placid, New York.

== Biography ==
Born in West Germany at Straubing, Bavaria, Wenzel moved to Liechtenstein at an early age. After she and her younger brother Andreas had success in ski racing – Hanni won the gold medal in slalom and silver in the combined at the 1974 World Championships – the family was granted Liechtenstein citizenship. Winning the slalom title on 8 February 1974, she did become the youngest female Alpine Skiing World Champion in the slalom discipline (17 years, 1 month, 25 days) - ousting Esme Mackinnon who was the first female Alpine Skiing Champion in 1931; the British racer was 17 years, 2 month and 17 days young when she was victorious in the slalom race on 19 February 1931. At the 1976 Winter Olympics in Innsbruck, she won the country's first Olympic medal, a bronze in the slalom at Axamer Lizum, and also picked up another world championship medal in the combined.

After winning the World Cup overall title in 1978, Wenzel's best year came in 1980. At the 1980 Winter Olympics in Lake Placid, she won gold medals in the slalom and giant slalom, and just missed out on a sweep by taking the silver in the downhill at Whiteface Mountain. She also easily won the world championship gold medal in the combined event, its final edition as a "paper race" and her fourth world championship medal in that event. At the same Olympics, her brother also won a silver medal, placing Liechtenstein high in the medal ranking of the games. In addition to her Olympic success, she won nine World Cup races in 1980 and captured the overall, giant slalom, and combined season titles, and brother Andreas won the men's overall for a Wenzel family sweep of the overall titles. Her daughter Tina Weirather won a bronze medal in Super-G for Liechtenstein at the 2018 Winter Olympics in PyeongChang.

Wenzel was banned from the 1984 Winter Olympics by the International Ski Federation (FIS) for accepting promotional payments directly, rather than through the national ski federation. Ingemar Stenmark of Sweden was also banned; both were double gold medalists in 1980.

Wenzel retired following the 1984 season with two Olympic titles, four World titles, two overall World Cups, three discipline World Cups plus three combined titles, and 33 World Cup victories. (Through 1980, the Olympics were also the World Championships.)

Through the 2018 Winter Olympics, Liechtenstein has won a total of ten medals at the Winter Olympics, with eight won by two sets of siblings – the Wenzels earned six, while brothers Willi and Paul Frommelt are responsible for two more.

== World cup results ==
=== Season titles ===
7 titles – (2 overall, 2 giant slalom, 1 slalom, 2 combined)

Season	Discipline
1974	Giant slalom
1978	Overall
1978	Slalom
1980	Overall
1980	Giant slalom
1980	Combined
1983	Combined

=== Season standings ===
Season	Age	Overall	Slalom	Giant slalom	Super G	Downhill	Combined
1972	15	40	—	27	not run	—	not awarded
1973	16	5	6	3	not run	18	not awarded
1974	17	3	4	1	not run	16	not awarded
1975	18	2	2	5	not run	12	not awarded
1976	19	9	9	13	not run	16	6
1977	20	5	5	8	not run	11	not awarded
1978	21	1	1	2	not run	15	not awarded
1979	22	2	5	2	not run	10	not awarded
1980	23	1	2	1	not run	3	1
1981	24	3	6	3	not run	9	2
1982	25	19	9	14	not run	—	—
1983	26	2	4	5	not awarded	—	1
1984	27	2	7	5	not awarded	3	4

=== Race victories ===
- 33 wins – (11 SL, 12 GS, 2 DH, 8 K)
- 89 podiums

Season	Date	Location	Discipline
1974	19 December 1973	Zell am See, Austria	Giant slalom
1975	21 February 1975	Naeba, Japan	Slalom
1975	14 March 1975	(United States) Sun Valley, USA	Slalom
1977	19 January 1977	Schruns, Austria	Combined
1978	15 December 1977	Madonna di Campiglio, Italy	Giant slalom
1978	10 January 1978	Les Mosses, Switzerland	Giant slalom
1978	22 January 1978	(Socialist Federal Republic of Yugoslavia) Maribor, Yugoslavia	Slalom
1978	24 January 1978	Berchtesgaden, West Germany	Slalom
1978	25 January 1978	Berchtesgaden, West Germany	Slalom
1978	2 March 1978	(United States) Stratton Mountain, USA	Giant slalom
1979	12 December 1978	Piancavallo, Italy	Giant slalom
1979	3 February 1979	Pfronten, West Germany	Slalom
1979	4 February 1979	Pfronten, West Germany	Combined
1979	8 February 1979	(Socialist Federal Republic of Yugoslavia) Maribor, Yugoslavia	Slalom
1980	8 December 1979	Limone Piemonte, Italy	Giant slalom
1980	14 December 1979	Limone Piemonte, Italy	Combined
1980	10 January 1980	Berchtesgaden, West Germany	Giant slalom
1980	16 January 1980	Arosa, Switzerland	Giant slalom
1980	21 January 1980	Bad Gastein, Austria	Slalom
1980	21 January 1980	Bad Gastein, Austria	Combined
1980	23 January 1980	(Socialist Federal Republic of Yugoslavia) Maribor, Yugoslavia	Slalom
1980	26 January 1980	Saint-Gervais, France	Giant slalom
1980	(United States) 1980 Winter Olympics		
1980	25 February 1980	(United States) Waterville Valley, USA	Giant slalom
1981	27 January 1981	Les Gets, France	Combined
1981	8 February 1981	Zwiesel, West Germany	Combined
1982	12 December 1981	Piancavallo, Italy	Combined
1982	18 March 1982	Furano, Japan	Giant slalom
1983	30 January 1983	Les Diablerets, Switzerland	Combined
1984	21 December 1983	Haus im Ennstal, Austria	Downhill
1984	22 December 1983	Haus im Ennstal, Austria	Giant slalom
1984	14 January 1984	Bad Gastein, Austria	Downhill
1984	15 January 1984	Bad Gastein, Austria	Combined
1984	20 March 1984	Zwiesel, West Germany	Slalom

== World Championship results ==
Year	Age	Slalom	Giant slalom	Super-G	Downhill	Combined
1974	17	1	7	not run	13	2
1976	19	3	20	not run	11	3
1978	21	6	5	not run	29	2
1980	23	1	1	not run	2	1
1982	25	DNF	DNF	not run	—	—

From 1948 through 1980, the Winter Olympics were also the World Championships for alpine skiing.
At the World Championships from 1954 through 1980, the combined was a "paper race" using the results of the three events (DH, GS, SL).

== Olympic results ==
Year	Age	Slalom	Giant slalom	Super-G	Downhill	Combined
1976	19	3	20	not run	11	not run
1980	23	1	1	not run	2	not run
1984	27	—	—	not run	—	not run

- Wenzel and Ingemar Stenmark were banned from the 1984 Olympics (endorsement compensation).

== Family ==
Wenzel is a sister of World Cup ski racers Petra Wenzel and Andreas Wenzel, and the wife of Austrian ski racer Harti Weirather, the world champion in downhill in 1982. Wenzel and Weirather run their own sports marketing agency, and their daughter Tina Weirather is also a World Cup ski racer. Tina Weirather won the bronze medal in Super-G for Liechtenstein at the 2018 Winter Olympics in Pyeongchang.

== Honours ==
- Commander's Cross of the Order of Merit of the Principality of Liechtenstein (06/09/2017).

== See also ==
- List of FIS Alpine Ski World Cup women's race winners
- List of Olympic medalist families

Preceded by Marita Koch	United Press International; Athlete of the Year; 1980	Succeeded by Chris Evert Lloyd
