= Danièle Debernard =

French alpine skier (born 1954)

Personal information
- Born: 21 July 1954 (age 72) Aime, France

Skiing career
- Sport: Alpine skiing
- Disciplines: Technical events, downhill

World Cup
- Wins: 5
- Podiums: 15
Medal record
Women's alpine skiing
Representing France
World Cup race podiums
Event	1st	2nd	3rd
Slalom	3	3	3
Giant slalom	2	2	0
Downhill	0	1	1
Total	5	6	4
Olympic Games
Silver medal – second place	1972 Sapporo	Slalom
Bronze medal – third place	1976 Innsbruck	Giant slalom
World Championships
Silver medal – second place	1976 Innsbruck	Combined

Danièle Debernard (born 21 July 1954) is a French former alpine skier who won two medals between the 1972 Winter Olympics and the 1976 Winter Olympics.

== Biography ==
She was born in Aime. In 1972 she won the silver medal in the Olympic slalom event. Four years later she won the bronze medal in the 1976 Olympic giant slalom competition. She also finished fourth in the slalom contest and fifth in the downhill event.

During her career she has achieved 15 results among the top 3 (5 victories) in the World Cup.
