= Graeme Ferguson =

Graeme Ferguson may refer to:

- Graeme Ferguson (biathlete) (born 1952), British biathlete
- Graeme Ferguson (filmmaker) (1929–2021), Canadian filmmaker and inventor
