= Australia at the 1976 Winter Olympics =

- IOC code: AUS
- NOC: Australian Olympic Committee
- Website: www.olympics.com.au

in Innsbruck
- Competitors: 8 in 3 sports
- Flag bearer: Colin Coates
- Medals: Gold 0 Silver 0 Bronze 0 Total 0

Winter Olympics appearances (overview)
- 1936; 1948; 1952; 1956; 1960; 1964; 1968; 1972; 1976; 1980; 1984; 1988; 1992; 1994; 1998; 2002; 2006; 2010; 2014; 2018; 2022; 2026

Australia competed at the 1976 Winter Olympics in Innsbruck, Austria. Colin Coates' sixth place in 10000 metres speed skating was Australia's best result so far at the Winter Olympics.

== Alpine skiing ==
Men

Athlete	Event	Final					
Athlete	Event	Run 1	Rank	Run 2	Rank	Total	Rank
Kim Clifford	Downhill	—N/a				1:51.64	34
Kim Clifford	Giant slalom	1:56.66	53	Disqualified			
Kim Clifford	Slalom	Did not finish					
David Griff	Downhill	—N/a				1:49.02	22
David Griff	Slalom	Did not finish					
Rob McIntyre	Downhill	—N/a				Did not finish	

Women

Athlete	Event	Final					
Athlete	Event	Run 1	Rank	Run 2	Rank	Total	Rank
Joanne Henke	Downhill	—N/a				1:59.59	36
Joanne Henke	Giant slalom	1:45.40	40	Disqualified			
Joanne Henke	Slalom	Did not finish					
Sally Rodd	Downhill	—N/a				1:54.82	31
Sally Rodd	Giant slalom	1:37.52	33	Disqualified			
Sally Rodd	Slalom	Did not finish					

== Figure skating ==
Athlete(s)	Event	CF/CD	SP/OD	FS/FD	Total		
Athlete(s)	Event	CF/CD	SP/OD	FS/FD	Ordinals	Points	Rank
Billy Schober	Men's	20	Did not finish				
Sharon Burley	Ladies'	—N/a	21	19	180.0	149.26	20

== Speed skating ==
Athlete	Event	Final	
Athlete	Event	Time	Rank
Colin Coates	500 m	41.77	25
Colin Coates	1000 m	1:21.72	11
Colin Coates	1500 m	2:03.34	8
Colin Coates	5000 m	7:41.96	10
Colin Coates	10000 m	15:19.80	6

== See also ==
- Australia at the Winter Olympics
