= David Cargill =

David Cargill may refer to:

- David Cargill (footballer) (1936–2011), Scottish footballer
- David Cargill (alpine skier) (born 1957), British former alpine skier
- David Cargill (missionary), British missionary to Fiji (1830s)
- David Sime Cargill (1826–1904), Scottish businessman
