= Marianne Zechmeister =

German alpine skier (born 1960)

Marianne Zechmeister (born 12 April 1960, in Berchtesgaden) is a German former alpine skier who competed in the women's downhill at the 1980 Winter Olympics, finishing 9th.
