= Richard Liversedge =

British luger (1940–2022)

Personal information
- Nationality: British
- Born: 31 August 1940; Cockermouth, England
- Died: 19 January 2022 (aged 81)

Sport
- Sport: Luge

Richard Liversedge (31 August 1940 – 19 January 2022) was a British luger. He competed at the 1968 Winter Olympics, the 1972 Winter Olympics and the 1976 Winter Olympics.
