= Alpine skiing at the 1976 Winter Olympics =

Alpine skiing at the XII Olympic Winter Games
- Venue: Patscherkofel (men's downhill) and Axamer Lizum, Tyrol, Austria
- Dates: 5–13 February 1976
- No. of events: 6
- Competitors: 181 from 33 nations

Location in Austria
Location in the Alps of Europe

Alpine Skiing at the 1976 Winter Olympics consisted of six alpine skiing events. Similar to the 1964 games, the men's downhill was held on Patscherkofel (above Igls), the other five events at Axamer Lizum. The events began on 5 February and ended on 13 February 1976.

== Medal summary ==
Nine nations won medals in Alpine skiing, with West Germany led the medal table with two gold and a silver, all won by Rosi Mittermaier. Italy won the most total medals, with four. The two medals won by Liechtenstein were the first for the country at the Olympic Games. The four medals won by West Germany were the first in the sport for the country on its own; Germany had previously won medals when unified as a single team.

=== Olympic medal table ===
Rank	Nation	Gold	Silver	Bronze	Total
1	West Germany	2	1	0	3
2	Italy	1	2	1	4
3	Switzerland	1	2	0	3
4	Austria	1	1	0	2
5	Canada	1	0	0	1
6	Liechtenstein	0	0	2	2
7	France	0	0	1	1
7	Sweden	0	0	1	1
7	United States	0	0	1	1
Totals (9 entries)		6	6	6	18

=== Men's events ===
Event	Gold		Silver		Bronze	
Downhill	Franz Klammer; Austria	1:45.73	Bernhard Russi; Switzerland	1:46.06	Herbert Plank; Italy	1:46.59
Giant slalom	Heini Hemmi; Switzerland	3:26.97	Ernst Good; Switzerland	3:27.17	Ingemar Stenmark; Sweden	3:27.41
Slalom	Piero Gros; Italy	2:03.29	Gustav Thöni; Italy	2:03.73	Willi Frommelt; Liechtenstein	2:04.28

=== Women's events ===
Event	Gold		Silver		Bronze	
Downhill	Rosi Mittermaier; West Germany	1:46.16	Brigitte Totschnig; Austria	1:46.68	Cindy Nelson; United States	1:47.50
Giant slalom	Kathy Kreiner; Canada	1:29.13	Rosi Mittermaier; West Germany	1:29.25	Danièle Debernard; France	1:29.95
Slalom	Rosi Mittermaier; West Germany	1:30.54	Claudia Giordani; Italy	1:30.87	Hanni Wenzel; Liechtenstein	1:32.20

== Course information ==
Date	Race	Start Elevation	Finish Elevation	Vertical Drop	Course Length	Average Gradient
Thu 5-Feb	Downhill – men	1,950 m (6,398 ft)	1,080 m (3,543 ft)	870 m (2,854 ft)	3.020 km (1.877 mi)	28.8%
Sun 8-Feb	Downhill – women	2,310 m (7,579 ft)	1,610 m (5,282 ft)	700 m (2,297 ft)	2.515 km (1.563 mi)	27.8%
Mon 9-Feb	Giant slalom – men (1st run)	1,990 m (6,529 ft)	1,540 m (5,052 ft)	450 m (1,476 ft)	1.525 km (0.948 mi)	29.5%
Tue 10-Feb	Giant slalom – men (2nd run)	2,035 m (6,677 ft)	1,610 m (5,282 ft)	425 m (1,394 ft)	1.200 km (0.746 mi)	35.4%
Fri 13-Feb	Giant slalom – women (1 run)	1,925 m (6,316 ft)	1,540 m (5,052 ft)	385 m (1,263 ft)	1.225 km (0.761 mi)	31.4%
Sat 14-Feb	Slalom – men (2 runs)	1,830 m (6,004 ft)	1,610 m (5,282 ft)	220 m (722 ft)	0.520 km (0.323 mi)	42.3%
Wed 11-Feb	Slalom – women (2 runs)	1,785 m (5,856 ft)	1,610 m (5,282 ft)	175 m (574 ft)	0.400 km (0.249 mi)	43.8%

== Participating nations ==
Thirty-three nations sent alpine skiers to compete in the events in Innsbruck. Andorra and San Marino made their Olympic alpine skiing debuts. Below is a list of the competing nations; in parentheses are the number of national competitors.

- Andorra (5)
- Argentina (5)
- Australia (5)
- Austria (12)
- Belgium (2)
- Bulgaria (5)
- Canada (8)
- Chile (5)
- Republic of China (1)
- Czechoslovakia (4)
- Finland (1)
- France (12)
- West Germany (13)
- Great Britain (10)
- Greece (2)
- Iceland (6)
- Iran (4)
- Italy (12)
- Japan (4)
- Lebanon (1)
- Liechtenstein (5)
- New Zealand (5)
- Norway (3)
- Poland (2)
- Romania (2)
- San Marino (2)
- Soviet Union (2)
- Spain (4)
- Sweden (4)
- Switzerland (13)
- Turkey (4)
- United States (14)
- Yugoslavia (4)

== World championships ==
From 1948 through 1980, the alpine skiing events at the Winter Olympics also served as the World Championships, held every two years. With the addition of the giant slalom, the combined event was dropped for 1950 and 1952, but returned as a World Championship event in 1954 as a "paper race" which used the results from the three events. During the Olympics from 1956 through 1980, World Championship medals were awarded by the FIS for the combined event. The combined returned as a separate event at the World Championships in 1982 and at the Olympics in 1988.

=== World championships medal table ===
Rank	Nation	Gold	Silver	Bronze	Total
1	West Germany	3	1	0	4
2	Italy	2	2	1	5
3	Switzerland	1	2	0	3
4	Austria	1	1	0	2
5	Canada	1	0	0	1
6	Liechtenstein	0	1	3	4
7	France	0	1	1	2
8	United States	0	0	2	2
9	Sweden	0	0	1	1
Totals (9 entries)		8	8	8	24

Inckuded combined events

=== Combined ===
==== Men's Combined ====
Medal	Athlete	Points	DH	GS	SL
1st place, gold medalist(s)	(Italy) Gustav Thöni (ITA)	24.62	26	4	2nd place, silver medalist(s)
2nd place, silver medalist(s)	(Liechtenstein) Willi Frommelt (LIE)	48.97	21	17	3rd place, bronze medalist(s)
3rd place, bronze medalist(s)	(United States) Greg Jones (USA)	65.84	11	9	19
4	(West Germany) Wolfgang Junginger (FRG)	70.63	29	19	6
5	(Liechtenstein) Andreas Wenzel (LIE)	75.85	28	20	10
6	(Spain) Francisco Fernández-Ochoa (ESP)	90.09	35	24	9

- Downhill: 5 February, Giant slalom: 9–10 February, Slalom: 14 February

==== Women's Combined ====
Medal	Athlete	Points	DH	GS	SL
1st place, gold medalist(s)	(West Germany) Rosi Mittermaier (FRG)	0.84	1st place, gold medalist(s)	2nd place, silver medalist(s)	1st place, gold medalist(s)
2nd place, silver medalist(s)	(France) Danièle Debernard (FRA)	29.22	5	3rd place, bronze medalist(s)	4
3rd place, bronze medalist(s)	(Liechtenstein) Hanni Wenzel (LIE)	46.00	11	20	3rd place, bronze medalist(s)
4	(United States) Cindy Nelson (USA)	66.28	3rd place, bronze medalist(s)	21	13
5	(Liechtenstein) Ursula Konzett (LIE)	81.13	24	18	11
6	(Czechoslovakia) Dagmar Kuzmanová (TCH)	89.74	31	9	9

- Downhill: 8 February, Giant slalom: 13 February, Slalom: 11 February

== See also ==
- Alpine skiing at the 1976 Winter Paralympics
