= Annemarie Bischofberger =

Swiss alpine skier (born 1960)

Annemarie Bischofberger (born 29 January 1960 in Oberegg District) is a Swiss former alpine skier who competed in the 1980 Winter Olympics, finishing 20th in the women's downhill.
