= Mark Agar =

British bobsledder (born 1948)

Personal information
- Nationality: British
- Born: 2 September 1948 (age 76); London, England

Sport
- Sport: Bobsleigh

Mark Agar (born 2 September 1948) is a British bobsledder. He competed in the two man and the four man bobsleigh events at the 1976 Winter Olympics in Innsbruck, Austria.
