= Claudia Giordani =

Italian alpine skier (born 1955)

Personal information
- Born: 27 October 1955 (age 70) Milan, Italy

Skiing career
- Sport: Alpine skiing
- Retired: 1981
- World Cup debut: 1973

Olympics
- Teams: 1
- Medals: 1 (0 gold)

World Championships
- Teams: 3
- Medals: 1 (0 gold)

World Cup
- Seasons: 8
- Wins: 3
- Podiums: 17
Medal record
International alpine ski competitions
Event	1st	2nd	3rd
Olympic Games	0	1	0
World Championships	0	1	0
Total	0	2	0
World Cup race podiums
Event	1st	2nd	3rd
Slalom	2	6	5
Giant slalom	1	1	1
Parallel	0	1	0
Total	3	8	6
Olympic Games
Silver medal – second place	1976 Innsbruck	Slalom

Claudia Giordani (born 27 October 1955) is an Italian former alpine skier who competed in the 1976 Winter Olympics and in the 1980 Winter Olympics.

She is the daughter of the Italian RAI journalist Aldo Giordani.

== Biography ==
In 1976, she won the silver medal in the Olympic slalom event. In the giant slalom competition she finished 13th. Four years later, she finished fifth in the slalom contest and tenth in the giant slalom event.

== World Cup results ==
Wins

Date	Place	Discipline
9 January 1974	(France) Les Gets	Giani slalom
1 February 1977	(Socialist Federal Republic of Yugoslavia) Maribor	Slalom
11 March 1980	(Austria) Saalbach-Hinterglemm	Slalom

== National titles ==
Giordani has won 14 national titles.

- Italian Alpine Ski Championships
  - Downhill: 1974 (1)
  - Slalom: 1973, 1976, 1977, 1978, 1979 (5)
  - Giant slalom: 1973, 1974, 1976, 1978, 1979, 1980 (6)
  - Combined: 1973, 1976 (2)

== See also ==
- Italy national alpine ski team at the Olympics
