= John Howell (bobsleigh) =

British bobsledder

Personal information
- Nationality: British
- Born: 17 June 1955; Stoke-on-Trent, England
- Died: 22 June 2006 (aged 51); Southampton, New York, United States

Sport
- Sport: Bobsleigh

John Howell (17 June 1955 – 22 June 2006) was a British bobsledder. He competed in the two man and the four man events at the 1980 Winter Olympics.
