= Kim Ferran =

British speed skater

Personal information
- Full name: Kim Ruth Ferran
- Nationality: British
- Born: 11 January 1958 (age 68) Birmingham

Sport
- Country: United Kingdom
- Sport: Speed skating

Achievements and titles
- Olympic finals: 1980
- Personal best: 500 metres short track - 51.78
Medal record
Gold - 1984 European indoor short track

Kim Ruth Ferran (born 11 January 1958) is a British former speed skater and short track speed skater. She was the British winner of the 1984 European indoor short track speed skating. During her personal/professional life she has undertaken many sports such as swimming and cycling and still does to this day. She still holds the two long track British records for 1000m and 3000m. She held the world record over 500 metres short track of 51.78s achieved in Bruges in 1984. She competed in the 1980 Winter Olympics in the 500m, 1,000m and 1,500m events.
