= Mary Seaton =

American alpine skier (born 1956)

Mary Seaton (born July 18, 1956 in Virginia, Minnesota) is an American former alpine skier who competed in the 1976 Winter Olympics.
