= Leslie Smith (skier) =

American alpine skier (born 1958)

Leslie Smith (born September 16, 1958) is an American former alpine skier who competed in the 1976 Winter Olympics. A native of Rutland, Vermont, Smith skied collegiately for Middlebury College.
