= Roddy Langmuir =

British former alpine skier (born 1960)

Roddy Langmuir (born 8 June 1960) is a British former alpine skier who competed in the 1980 Winter Olympics. He then trained as an architect and is now a Practice Leader at Cullinan Studio, an award-winning architectural and masterplanning practice based in London, UK.
