= Jackie Price (bobsleigh) =

British bobsledder

Personal information
- Nationality: British
- Born: 15 August 1950 (age 74); Pontypridd, Wales

Sport
- Sport: Bobsleigh

Jackie Price (born 15 August 1950) is a British bobsledder. He competed at the 1972, 1976 and the 1980 Winter Olympics.
