= Mandy Horsepool =

British speed skater (born 1959)

Personal information
- Full name: Amanda Jane Horsepool
- Born: 18 May 1959 (age 67) Basford, Nottingham, England

Sport
- Sport: Speed skating

Amanda Jane Horsepool (born 18 May 1959) is a British speed skater. She competed in three events at the 1980 Winter Olympics.
