= Patscherkofel =

Mountain in Tyrol, Austria

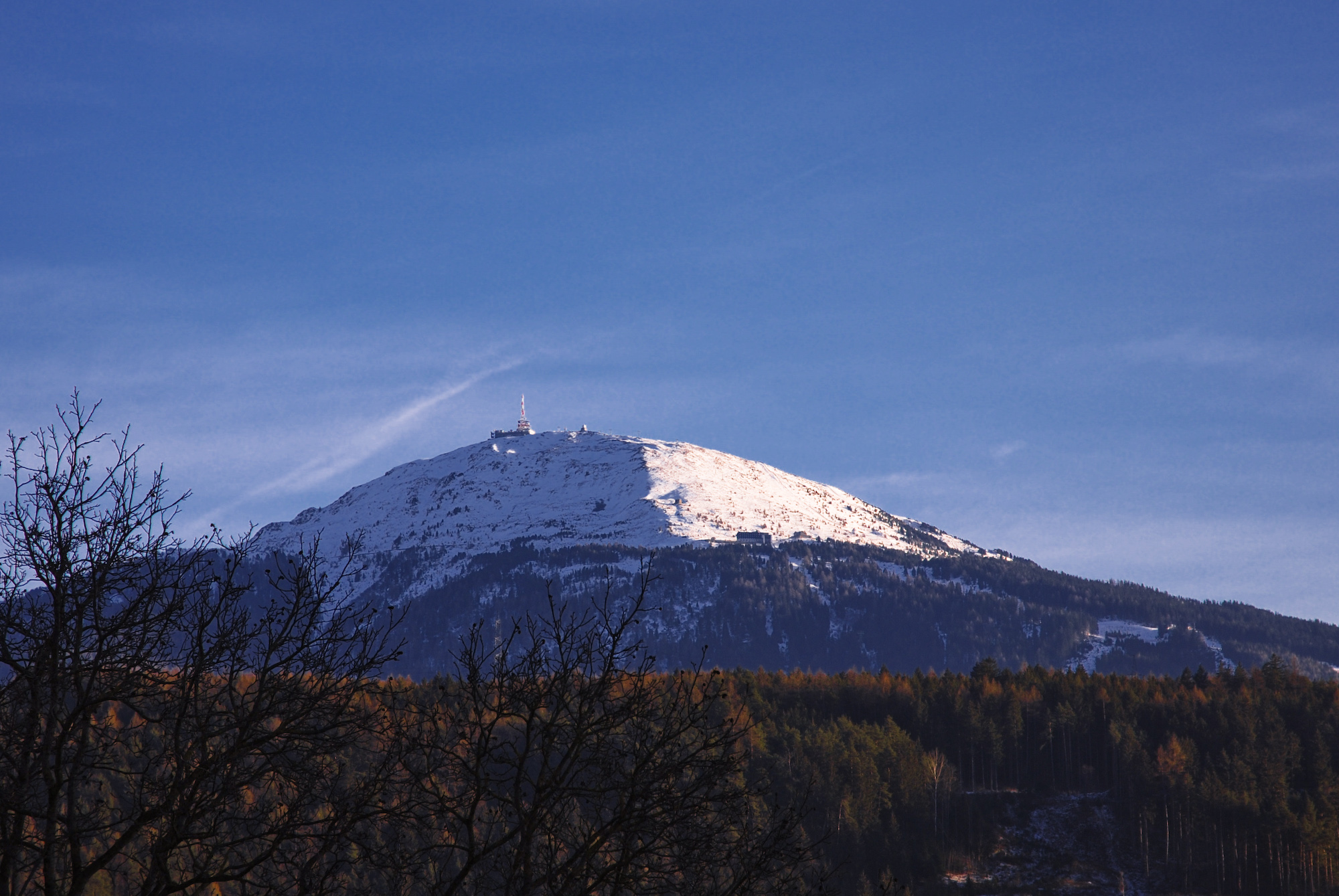
- Patscherkofel in December 2006

Highest point
- Elevation: 2,246 m (7,369 ft)
- Prominence: 1,376 m (4,514 ft)
- Coordinates: 47°12′32″N 11°27′39″E

Geography
- Location: Tyrol, Austria
- Parent range: Tuxer Alpen

Location in the Alps of Europe

Patscherkofel is a mountain and ski area in the Alps, in Tyrol in western Austria, 7 km (4 mi.) south of Innsbruck. The peak rises to a summit elevation of 2,246 m (7,369 ft) above sea level. The town of Igls at its northwest base is at 870 m (2,854 ft), a vertical drop of 1,376 m (4,514 ft).

== Geology and Soils ==
Quartz phyllite is the dominant bedrock, with gneiss and feldspar at the peak. Calcium-rich bedrock such as basalt, chalk and dolomite also occurs but is too scarce to have much influence on the soils of this severely glaciated mountain. Acid brown earth, podzolized brown earth and iron-humus podzol are the dominant soil types.

== Winter Olympics ==
During both the 1964 and 1976 Winter Olympics, the mountain was the venue for the men's downhill race, along with the bobsleigh and luge competitions in neighboring Igls. The other five alpine skiing events were held at Axamer Lizum.

Ski legend Franz Klammer of Austria, then age 22, won his Olympic gold medal at Patscherkofel, dramatically edging out defending Olympic champion Bernhard Russi of Switzerland by 0.33 seconds in the 1976 Downhill. The 3.020 km (1.88 mi) course had a vertical drop of 870 m (2,854 ft) and started at 1,950 m (6,398 ft), well below the mountain's summit. Behind at the last timing interval, Klammer finished at 1:45.73, an average speed of 102.8 km/h (63.9 mph) and vertical descent rate of 8.2 m/s (26.9 ft/s).

Egon Zimmermann, also of Austria, took the gold medal a dozen years earlier in the 1964 Olympic downhill. His winning time was 2:18.16, more than a half minute behind Klammer's.

== Climate ==
Climate data for Patscherkofel (1971–2000)
Month	Jan	Feb	Mar	Apr	May	Jun	Jul	Aug	Sep	Oct	Nov	Dec	Year
Record high °C (°F)	9.5 (49.1)	8.6 (47.5)	8.4 (47.1)	9.7 (49.5)	16.6 (61.9)	19.0 (66.2)	23.4 (74.1)	21.6 (70.9)	19.2 (66.6)	15.2 (59.4)	12.2 (54.0)	10.0 (50.0)	23.4 (74.1)
Mean daily maximum °C (°F)	−3.6 (25.5)	−4.0 (24.8)	−2.4 (27.7)	−0.4 (31.3)	5.0 (41.0)	8.5 (47.3)	11.4 (52.5)	11.5 (52.7)	8.3 (46.9)	4.7 (40.5)	−0.6 (30.9)	−2.5 (27.5)	3.0 (37.4)
Daily mean °C (°F)	−6.3 (20.7)	−6.8 (19.8)	−5.3 (22.5)	−3.2 (26.2)	2.0 (35.6)	5.1 (41.2)	7.9 (46.2)	8.0 (46.4)	5.0 (41.0)	1.7 (35.1)	−3.3 (26.1)	−5.2 (22.6)	0.0 (32.0)
Mean daily minimum °C (°F)	−8.4 (16.9)	−9.0 (15.8)	−7.5 (18.5)	−5.2 (22.6)	−0.3 (31.5)	2.5 (36.5)	5.1 (41.2)	5.5 (41.9)	2.7 (36.9)	−0.4 (31.3)	−5.5 (22.1)	−7.5 (18.5)	−2.3 (27.9)
Record low °C (°F)	−29.5 (−21.1)	−25.6 (−14.1)	−26.3 (−15.3)	−16.3 (2.7)	−13.6 (7.5)	−6.3 (20.7)	−3.6 (25.5)	−3.8 (25.2)	−7.7 (18.1)	−12.7 (9.1)	−20.4 (−4.7)	−23.4 (−10.1)	−29.5 (−21.1)
Average precipitation mm (inches)	49.4 (1.94)	39.2 (1.54)	59.5 (2.34)	61.0 (2.40)	78.3 (3.08)	108.3 (4.26)	131.7 (5.19)	116.9 (4.60)	78.1 (3.07)	46.1 (1.81)	55.1 (2.17)	55.2 (2.17)	878.8 (34.60)
Average snowfall cm (inches)	70.9 (27.9)	69.3 (27.3)	91.9 (36.2)	81.4 (32.0)	43.5 (17.1)	24.2 (9.5)	7.2 (2.8)	8.2 (3.2)	17.2 (6.8)	35.7 (14.1)	65.0 (25.6)	72.9 (28.7)	587.4 (231.3)
Average precipitation days (≥ 1.0 mm)	8.8	8.0	10.5	11.0	10.9	14.1	14.3	13.8	9.5	7.5	9.5	9.0	126.9
Average relative humidity (%) (at 14:00)	68.8	71.5	75.3	78.2	74.2	73.5	70.5	70.3	69.8	67.5	71.3	68.8	71.6
Mean monthly sunshine hours	119.0	131.9	148.3	150.9	191.9	181.8	220.8	217.9	185.9	171.1	121.0	109.3	1,949.8
Percentage possible sunshine	46.8	48.1	42.1	38.9	43.6	40.6	49.0	52.0	51.2	52.4	45.9	45.9	46.4
Source: Central Institute for Meteorology and Geodynamics

Climate data for Patscherkofel: 2251m (1991−2020)
Month	Jan	Feb	Mar	Apr	May	Jun	Jul	Aug	Sep	Oct	Nov	Dec	Year
Record high °C (°F)	8.9 (48.0)	8.6 (47.5)	9.7 (49.5)	12.5 (54.5)	18.3 (64.9)	22.8 (73.0)	23.0 (73.4)	21.8 (71.2)	18.8 (65.8)	15.7 (60.3)	11.5 (52.7)	9.9 (49.8)	23.0 (73.4)
Mean daily maximum °C (°F)	−3.4 (25.9)	−4.1 (24.6)	−1.6 (29.1)	1.5 (34.7)	6.0 (42.8)	10.5 (50.9)	12.1 (53.8)	12.1 (53.8)	8.3 (46.9)	4.9 (40.8)	0.2 (32.4)	−2.6 (27.3)	3.7 (38.6)
Daily mean °C (°F)	−5.9 (21.4)	−6.4 (20.5)	−4.2 (24.4)	−1.1 (30.0)	3.4 (38.1)	7.3 (45.1)	9.3 (48.7)	9.5 (49.1)	5.6 (42.1)	2.5 (36.5)	−2.1 (28.2)	−5.1 (22.8)	1.1 (33.9)
Mean daily minimum °C (°F)	−8.0 (17.6)	−9.6 (14.7)	−6.5 (20.3)	−3.7 (25.3)	0.5 (32.9)	4.1 (39.4)	6.2 (43.2)	5.6 (42.1)	2.9 (37.2)	0.1 (32.2)	−4.4 (24.1)	−7.2 (19.0)	−1.7 (29.0)
Record low °C (°F)	−21.8 (−7.2)	−25.5 (−13.9)	−22.5 (−8.5)	−18.8 (−1.8)	−10.7 (12.7)	−6.9 (19.6)	−3.4 (25.9)	−4.3 (24.3)	−6.4 (20.5)	−12.9 (8.8)	−19.4 (−2.9)	−23.4 (−10.1)	−25.5 (−13.9)
Source: Central Institute for Meteorology and Geodynamics

== Video ==
- You Tube – Franz Klammer's winning run (from ABC Sports)
