= Paul Gibbins =

British biathlete (born 1953)

Personal information
- Nationality: British
- Born: 3 January 1953 (age 72); Leicester, England

Sport
- Sport: Biathlon

Paul Gibbins (born 3 January 1953) is a British biathlete. He competed at the 1976 Winter Olympics and the 1980 Winter Olympics.
