= Gomer Lloyd =

British bobsledder (1947-2016)

Personal information
- Nationality: British
- Born: 26 February 1947 Swansea, Wales
- Died: 3 January 2016 (aged 68) Calgary, Alberta, Canada

Sport
- Sport: Bobsleigh

Gomer Lloyd (26 February 1947 – 3 January 2016) was a British bobsledder. He competed at the 1972, 1976, 1980, and the 1984 Winter Olympics.
