= Serena Iliffe =

British alpine skier (born 1960)

Personal information
- Nationality: British
- Born: 6 January 1960 (age 65); Sydney, Australia

Sport
- Sport: Alpine skiing

Serena Iliffe (born 6 January 1960) is a British alpine skier. She competed in the women's giant slalom at the 1976 Winter Olympics.
