= Geoff Sandys =

British speed skater (born 1951)

Personal information
- Full name: Geoffrey Sandys
- Nationality: British
- Born: 9 June 1951 (age 75) London, England

Sport
- Sport: Speed skating

Geoffrey Sandys (born 9 June 1951) is a British speed skater. He competed at the 1976 Winter Olympics and the 1980 Winter Olympics.
