= Loni Klettl =

Canadian alpine skier (born 1959)

Loni Klettl (born 8 September 1959) is a Canadian former alpine skier who competed in the 1980 Winter Olympics. She placed 13th in the women's downhill event. Her father, Toni Klettl, was a warden in Jasper National Park between 1955 and 1985.
