= Alan Stewart (alpine skier) =

British alpine skier (born 1955)

Alan Stewart (born 19 September 1955) is a British former alpine skier who competed in the 1976 Winter Olympics and in the 1980 Winter Olympics.

== Early life ==
He was born in the town of Inverkeithing, in Fife, Scotland.
