= John French (speed skater) =

British speed skater

Personal information
- Nationality: British
- Born: 22 December 1955 (age 69); Peterborough, England

Sport
- Sport: Speed skating

John French (born 22 December 1955) is a British speed skater. He competed in two events at the 1980 Winter Olympics.
