= Jim Wood (biathlete) =

British biathlete (1952–2020)

Personal information
- Nationality: British
- Born: 13 October 1952; Sherborne, Dorset, England
- Died: 26 August 2020 (aged 67)

Sport
- Sport: Biathlon

Jim Wood (13 October 1952 – 26 August 2020) was a British biathlete. He competed at the 1980 Winter Olympics and the 1984 Winter Olympics.
