= Derek Prentice =

British luger

Derek Prentice MBE
Personal information
- Nationality: British
- Born: 13 June 1950 (age 74)

Sport
- Sport: Luge

Derek Ernest Prentice (born 13 June 1950) is a British luger. He competed in the men's singles and doubles events at the 1980 Winter Olympics.
