= Marlies Oberholzer =

Swiss alpine skier (born 1958)

Marlies Oberholzer (born 25 April 1958 in Goldingen) is a retired Swiss alpine skier who competed in the 1976 Winter Olympics.

Marlies Oberholzer grew up in Goldingen SG, practically next to the mountain railroads at Atzmännig. Her father was operations manager there for 30 years. At a young age she joined the Goldingen ski club. Later she moved to Wangen.

== Career ==
Marlies Oberholzer stood on the podium of a World Cup race at the age of 17 on January 21, 1976. In the downhill race in Bad Gastein, Austria, which was plagued by fog and fresh snow, she finished second behind her compatriot Doris de Agostini. Three weeks later, she participated in the Olympic Games in Innsbruck, where she finished 8th in the downhill and 26th in the giant slalom. She placed 26th overall in the 1975-76 World Cup, 35th in 1976-77 and 36th in 1977-73.
