= Dagmar Kuzmanová =

Slovak skier (born 1956)

Personal information
- Nationality: Slovak
- Born: 17 September 1956 (age 68); Handlová, Czechoslovakia

Sport
- Sport: Alpine skiing

Dagmar Kuzmanová (born 17 September 1956) is a Slovak alpine skier. She competed in three events at the 1976 Winter Olympics.
