= Paola Hofer =

Italian alpine skier (born 1954)

Paola Hofer (born 29 January 1954) is an Italian retired alpine skier who competed in the 1976 Winter Olympics.
