= Riitta Ollikka =

Finnish alpine skier (born 1956)

Riitta Ollikka (born 11 October 1956, in Hämeenlinna) is a Finnish former alpine skier who competed in the 1976 Winter Olympics. Her grandfather was athletic Väinö Eskola. She is married to Reijo Laksola an ice hockey player who also competed at the 1976 Winter Olympics, he was 23 at the time and ranked 4th overall in his category.

== Olympia ==
Competed in the 1976 Winter Olympics in Innsbruck as an alpine skier for Finland. She was only 19 at the time. She competed in 3 different disciplines all falling under alpine skiing, those being Women's Downhill where she ranked 30th, Women's Slalom where she ranked 17th and Women's Giant Slalom where she ranked 34th. She did not win any medals in the games.
