= Janet Wells =

New Zealand alpine skier (born 1957)

Janet Wells now Janet Reeves (born 1957) is an alpine skier from New Zealand.

In the 1976 Winter Olympics at Innsbruck, she came 41st in the giant slalom.

Janet Reeves is now a personal trainer in Christchurch, New Zealand, with her own company, Body by Jan.
