= Rosi Mittermaier =

German alpine skier (1950–2023)

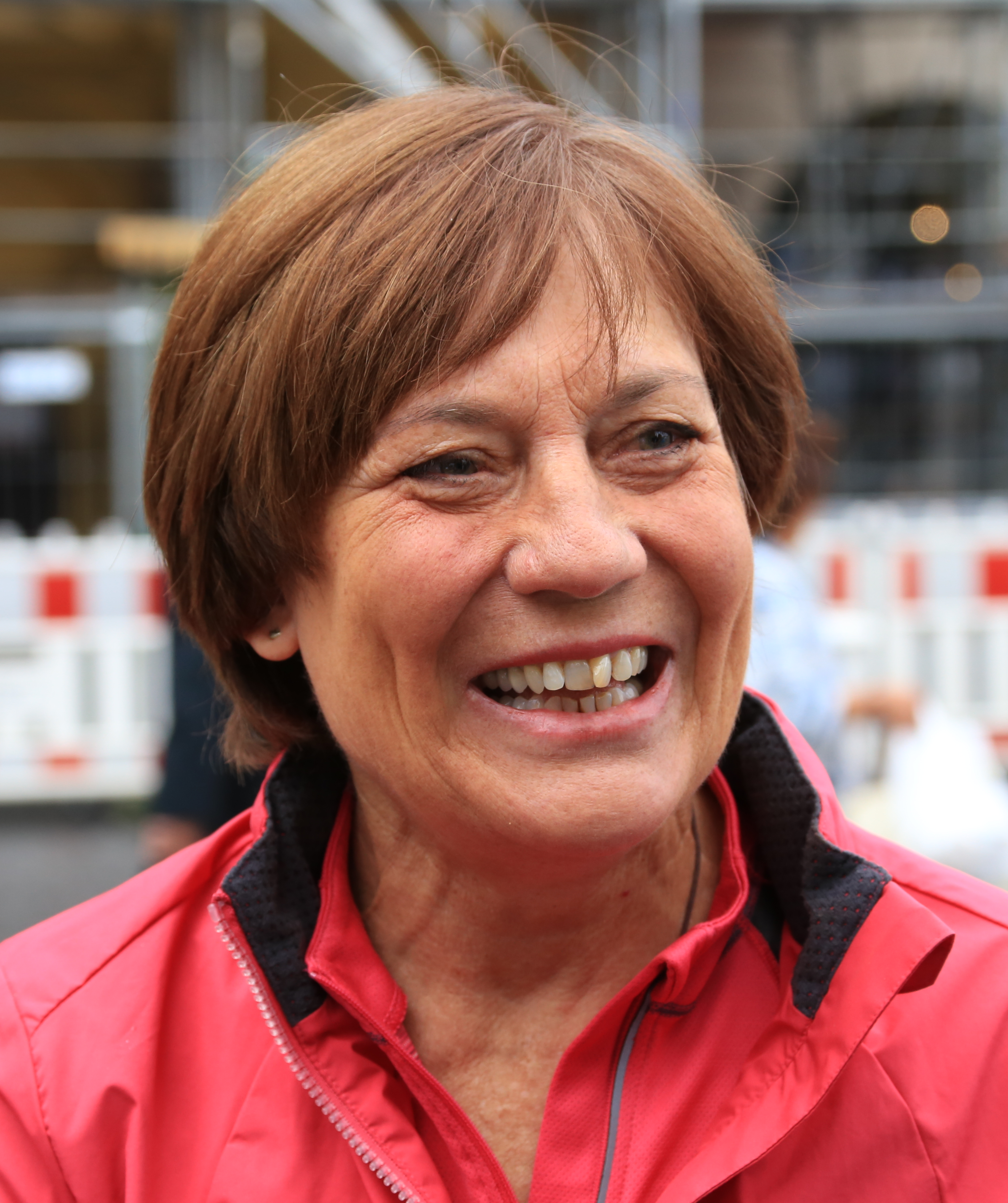
- Mittermaier in 2014

Personal information
- Born: Rosa Anna Katharina Mittermaier; 5 August 1950 Munich, Bavaria, West Germany
- Died: 4 January 2023 (aged 72) Garmisch-Partenkirchen, Bavaria, Germany
- Height: 1.59 m (5 ft 3 in)
- Website: www.rosi-mittermaier.de

Skiing career
- Sport: Alpine skiing
- Retired: 31 May 1976 (age 25)
- Disciplines: Downhill, giant slalom, slalom, combined
- World Cup debut: 1 February 1967 (age 16)

Olympics
- Teams: 3 – (1968, 1972, 1976)
- Medals: 3 (2 gold)

World Championships
- Teams: 5 – (1968–76) (Note: includes 3 Olympics)
- Medals: 4 (3 gold)

World Cup
- Seasons: 10 – (1967–1976)
- Wins: 10 – (1 GS, 8 SL, 1 K)
- Podiums: 41 – (4 DH, 11 GS, 22 SL, 4 K)
- Overall titles: 1 – (1976)
- Discipline titles: 2 – (SL & K in 1976)
Medal record
Women's alpine skiing
Representing West Germany
Olympic Games
Gold medal – first place	1976 Innsbruck	Downhill
Gold medal – first place	1976 Innsbruck	Slalom
Silver medal – second place	1976 Innsbruck	Giant slalom
World Championships
Gold medal – first place	1976 Innsbruck	Combined

Rosa Anna Katharina Mittermaier-Neureuther (German: [ˈʁozi ˈmɪtɐˌmaɪ̯ɐ]; née Mittermaier; 5 August 1950 – 4 January 2023) was a German alpine skier. She was the overall World Cup champion in 1976 and a double gold medalist at the 1976 Winter Olympics.

Mittermaier competed in alpine skiing from 1967 to 1976, retiring after a highly successful season in which she finished with two Olympic gold medals and ranked first in the World Cup. She remained popular, advertising for sports and as a non-fiction writer. She was known as Gold-Rosi, and she was inducted into Germany's Sports Hall of Fame in April 2006 when it was initiated.

== Life and career ==
Mittermaier was born in Munich and grew up in Reit im Winkl on the Winklmoos-Alm. Her father ran the Passauer Hütte there. A certified skiing instructor, he also owned a skiing school from 1966, and was the first to train his daughters.

=== Racing career ===
Mittermaier made her World Cup debut in the inaugural season of 1967, and won her first World Cup race two seasons later.

She won two gold medals (downhill and slalom) and one silver (giant slalom) at the 1976 Winter Olympics in Innsbruck. Her victory in the Olympic downhill was the only downhill win in her international career. Mittermaier was the most successful athlete at those games, along with cross-country skier Raisa Smetanina of the Soviet Union, earning her the nickname of Gold-Rosi within Germany (then West Germany).

In addition to the overall World Cup title, she also won the season title in slalom and combined in 1976. After winning both races at Copper Mountain in Colorado to wrap up the overall and slalom titles, the four-year-old resort immediately named the race course run after her. In addition to her success in international competition, she also won 16 German national titles during her career.

On 31 May 1976, she retired from international competition at age 25, following the very successful 1976 season.

=== After racing ===
After her career in sports, Mittermaier joined Mark McCormack's International Management Group as the only German alongside Jean-Claude Killy, Jackie Stewart, and Björn Borg. During her three-year contract, she designed a collection of winter sports clothing and made international appearances for various skiing products. She wrote non-fiction books, often together with her husband. She worked for several charities and occasionally as a commentator for German television for major sporting events. She established a charitable foundation to aid children with rheumatism in 2000.

=== Personal life ===
Mittermaier was born with a twin sister who died at birth. Her younger sister Evi Mittermaier also competed as an alpine skier and previously lived in a hotel. Rosi and Evi also recorded two albums of Bavarian folk songs together.

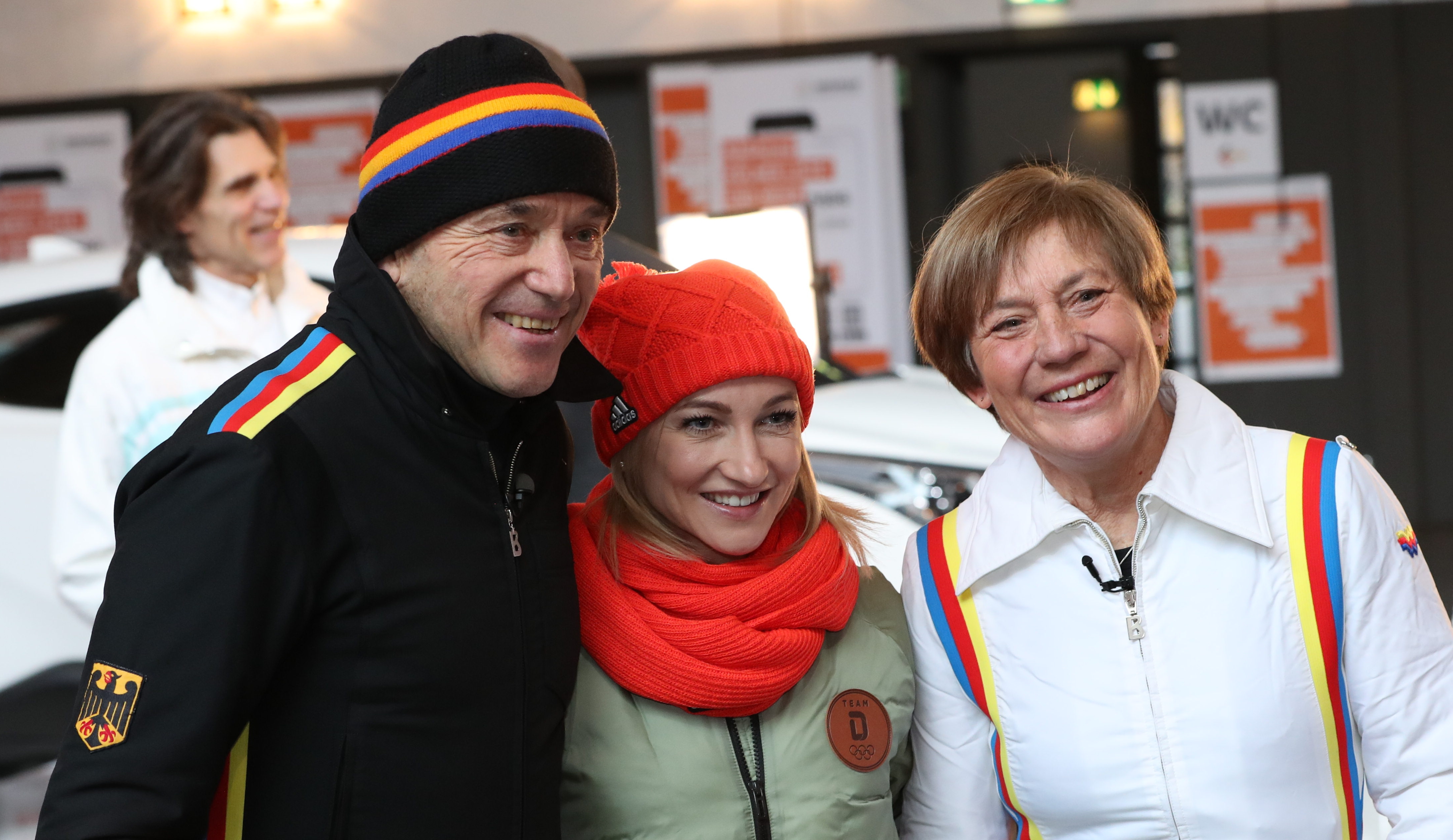
Mittermaier (r.) and her husband with figure skater Aljona Savchenko in 2018

In 1980 she married Christian Neureuther, winner of six World Cup slalom races. They are the parents of Felix Neureuther (b. 1984), a World Cup ski racer for Germany, and daughter Ameli who works as a fashion designer.

Mittermaier died of cancer in Garmisch-Partenkirchen on 4 January 2023, at the age of 72 years. She is survived by her husband Christian, her two children, and (as of 2026) five grandchildren.

Her mortal remains were cremated and the urn was buried at the cemetery in Garmisch. Next to her gravestone - a rock, which bears the inscription "Rosi Mittermaier-Neureuther" and resembles a mountain - is a similar one without inscription, reserved for her husband.

== Awards ==
- 1976 German Sportswoman of the Year
- 1999 Olympic Order
- 2001 Goldene Sportpyramide of the Stiftung Deutsche Sporthilfe
- 2005 Order of Merit of the Federal Republic of Germany
- 2006 Germany's Sports Hall of Fame
- 2007 Bavarian Order of Merit

She was made an honorary citizen of both Garmisch-Partenkirchen and Reit im Winkl.

== World Cup results ==
=== Season standings ===
Season	Age	Overall	Slalom	Giant slalom	Super G	Downhill	Combined
1967	16	27	19	—	not run	—	not awarded
1968	17	12	11	8	not run	—	not awarded
1969	18	7	4	11	not run	5	not awarded
1970	19	11	8	10	not run	12	not awarded
1971	20	14	13	9	not run	15	not awarded
1972	21	6	4	7	not run	10	not awarded
1973	22	4	2	8	not run	9	not awarded
1974	23	7	2	13	not run	11	not awarded
1975	24	3	7	7	not run	6	not awarded
1976	25	1	1	3	not run	9	1

Points were only awarded for top ten finishes (see scoring system).

=== Season titles ===
Season	Discipline
1976	Overall
1976	Slalom
1976	Combined

=== Race victories ===
- 10 wins – (1 GS, 8 SL, 1 K)
- 41 podiums – (4 DH, 11 GS, 22 SL, 4 K)

Season	Date	Location	Discipline
1969	16 January 1969	Schruns, Austria	Slalom
1970	14 March 1970	Voss, Norway	Slalom
1973	2 February 1973	Schruns, Austria	Slalom
1974	27 February 1974	Abetone, Italy	Slalom
1974	8 March 1974	(Czech Republic) Vysoké Tatry, Czechoslovakia	Slalom
1975	13 December 1974	Cortina d'Ampezzo, Italy	Slalom
1976	17 December 1975	Cortina d'Ampezzo, Italy	Combined
1976	22 January 1976	Bad Gastein, Austria	Slalom
1976	5 March 1976	Copper Mountain, United States	Giant slalom
1976	6 March 1976	Copper Mountain, United States	Slalom

== World championship results ==
Year	Age	Slalom	Giant slalom	Super-G	Downhill	Combined
1968	17	DNF2	20	not run	25	—
1970	19	15	7	not run	20	5
1972	21	17	12	not run	6	7
1974	23	6	DNF	not run	DNF	—
1976	25	1	2	not run	1	1

From 1948 through 1980, the Winter Olympics were also the World Championships for alpine skiing.

At the World Championships from 1954 through 1980, the combined was a "paper race" using the results of the three events (DH, GS, SL).

== Olympic results ==
Year	Age	Slalom	Giant slalom	Super-G	Downhill	Combined
1968	17	DNF2	20	not run	25	not run
1972	21	17	12	not run	6	not run
1976	25	1	2	not run	1	not run

== Publications ==
Many of her books were written with her husband Christian Neureuther:

- Mittermaier, Rosi (1977). Ski-Zirkus : meine 10 Jahre im Hochleistungssport (in German). Frankfurt/M.: Ullstein. ISBN 3-550-17672-4. OCLC 3629220.
- ——; Neureuther, Christian; Messmann, Kuno (1983). Unser Skibuch. München: Mosaik. ISBN 3-570-00735-9. OCLC 64741076.
- —— (1994). Gewinnen mit Walking das Original-Rosi-Mittermaier-Walking-Buch (in German). Düsseldorf. ISBN 978-3-7919-0531-0. OCLC 75506562.
- —— (2004). Nordic Walking Ganzjahrestraining - starke Muskeln - gesunde Gelenke - top Kondition - super Figur (in German). München. ISBN 978-3-426-64139-2. OCLC 76551517.
- ——; Bartl, Reiner (2005). Stabile Knochen, mobiles Leben Osteoporose aktiv begegnen, vermeiden, behandeln und beweglich bleiben; frühzeitige Diagnose und wirksame Therapie; 3-stufiges Knochenaufbauprogramm mit Rosi Mittermaier (in German). München. ISBN 978-3-426-64277-1. OCLC 181457767.
- ——; Neureuther, Christian; Mittermaier, Rosi (2006). Nordic-Walking-Praxisbuch leichter Einstieg in 7 Schritten mit der Nordic-ALFA-Technik; für jeden geeignet – rundum gesund (in German). München. ISBN 978-3-426-64341-9. OCLC 163402416.
- ——; Neureuther, Christian; Deutscher Skilehrerverband (2008). Neuer Schwung für alle, die die Freude am Skifahren (wieder) entdecken wollen; mit allen Skigebieten (D), Loipen, Insidertipps, Checklisten (in German). München. ISBN 978-3-485-01146-4. OCLC 271637893.
- ——; Neureuther, Christian (2008). Die Heilkraft des Sports mit Spaß und Freude mehr Gesundheit (in German). München. ISBN 978-3-485-01130-3. OCLC 227007343.
- ——; Neureuther, Christian (2009). Sicher durch den Skiwinter (in German). München. ISBN 978-3-485-01189-1. OCLC 643238604.
- —— (2011). Fröhlich bin ich sowieso mit 11 Rezepten (in German). München. ISBN 978-3-485-01321-5. OCLC 759529483.
- ——; Neureuther, Christian (2012). Die schönsten Schneeschuhtouren Bayern, Tirol, Salzburger Land (in German). [Luzern]. ISBN 978-3-7243-1043-3. OCLC 774039790.
- ——; Mittermaier, Rosi; Neureuther, Christian (2013). Kraftort Alpen. München. ISBN 978-3-7243-1050-1. OCLC 859342148.
- ——; Neureuther, Christian; Edition Raetia GmbH (2016). Mit Rosi und Christian in Südtirol kulinarische Begegnungen (in German). Bozen. ISBN 978-88-7283-555-5. OCLC 932030791.

== See also ==
- List of FIS Alpine Ski World Cup women's race winners

== Notes ==
Awards and achievements
Preceded by (Germany) Ellen Wellmann	German Sportswoman of the Year; 1976	Succeeded by (Germany) Eva Wilms
