= Graeme Ferguson (biathlete) =

British biathlete (born 1952)

Personal information
- Nationality: British
- Born: 17 June 1952 (age 72); Kirkcaldy, Scotland

Sport
- Sport: Biathlon

Graeme Ferguson (born 17 June 1952) is a British biathlete. He competed at the 1976 Winter Olympics, the 1980 Winter Olympics and the 1984 Winter Olympics.
