= Brigitte Totschnig =

Austrian alpine skier

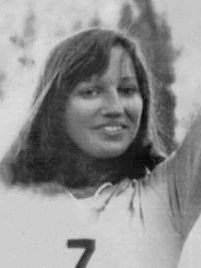
- Totschnig at the 1976 Olympics

Personal information
- Born: 30 August 1954 (age 71) Filzmoos, Austria
- Height: 1.65 m (5 ft 5 in)

Skiing career
- Sport: Alpine skiing
- Club: SC Filzmoos
- Disciplines: Speed events, giant slalom

World Cup
- Wins: 7
- Podiums: 13
Medal record
Women's alpine skiing
Representing Austria
World Cup race podiums
Event	1st	2nd	3rd
Giant slalom	1	0	0
Downhill	7	1	3
Combined	0	1	0
Total	8	2	3
International competitions
Event	1st	2nd	3rd
Olympic Games	0	1	0
World Championships	0	1	0
Total	0	2	0
Olympic Games
Silver medal – second place	1976 Innsbruck	Downhill

Brigitte Totschnig (later Habersatter, born 30 August 1954) is a retired Austrian alpine skier.

== Career ==
She competed at the 1972 and 1976 Winter Olympics and won a silver medal in the downhill in 1976. Totschnig finished seventh in the downhill at the FIS Alpine World Ski Championships 1978. Between 1975 and 1977 she had seven victories and 13 podiums at the World Cup, 11 of them in downhill; her best overall placement was fourth in the 1976–77 season. She retired after the 1977–1978 season, in which she won national titles in the downhill and combined. In 1978 she built the Aparthotel Olympia in Filzmoos and ran it since then. Totschnig was named Austrian Sportswoman of the Year in 1976 and in 1996 was awarded a silver medal for services to Austria. Her father-in-law, Walter Habersatter, competed for Austria in ski jumping.
