= Sally Rodd =

Australian alpine skier (born 1956)

Personal information
- Nationality: Australian
- Born: 10 December 1956 (age 69)

Sport
- Sport: Alpine skiing

Sally Rodd (born 10 December 1956) is an Australian alpine skier. She competed in three events at the 1976 Winter Olympics.
