= Theresa Wallis =

British alpine skier (born 1957)

Personal information
- Nationality: British
- Born: 3 June 1957 (age 67)

Sport
- Sport: Alpine skiing

Theresa Wallis (born 3 June 1957) is a British alpine skier. She competed in two events at the 1976 Winter Olympics.
