= Archie Marshall (speed skater) =

British speed skater

Personal information
- Full name: Archibald Marshall
- Nationality: British
- Born: 23 October 1952 (age 72); Glasgow, Scotland

Sport
- Sport: Speed skating

Archibald Marshall (born 23 October 1952) is a British speed skater. He competed at the 1976 Winter Olympics and the 1980 Winter Olympics.
