= Ross Blyth =

British alpine skier (born 1961)

Ross Blyth (born 30 April 1961) is a British former alpine skier who competed in the 1980 Winter Olympics.
