= Sue Gibson (skier) =

New Zealand alpine skier (born 1955)

Ann Susan Gibson now Sue Robson (born 1955) is an alpine skier from New Zealand.

In the 1976 Winter Olympics at Innsbruck, she came 38th in the Downhill, 19th in the Slalom (the best placing for the New Zealand alpine skiers), and 42nd in the Giant Slalom.
