= Fiona Easdale =

British skier (born 1959)

Personal information
- Nationality: British
- Born: 11 March 1959 (age 67) Windsor, England

Sport
- Sport: Alpine skiing

Fiona Easdale (born 11 March 1959) is a British alpine skier. She competed in three events at the 1976 Winter Olympics.

Easdale was MD of the ski company Bladon Lines in the 1980s. She left in 1991 to found YSE Ski with John Yates Smith.
