= Moira Cargill =

British alpine skier (born 1958)

Moira Cargill (born 10 December 1958) is a British former alpine skier who competed in the 1980 Winter Olympics.
