= Joanne Henke =

Australian alpine skier (born 1958)

Joanne Henke (born 5 November 1958) is a former Australian alpine skier who represented Australia at the 1976 Winter Olympics. She is the daughter of former ice hockey player and Australian winter sports administrator Geoff Henke and 1952 figure skating Olympian Gweneth Molony.
