= David Cargill (alpine skier) =

British alpine skier (born 1957)

David Cargill (born 15 April 1957) is a British former alpine skier who competed in the 1980 Winter Olympics.
