= Anne Robb =

British alpine skier (born 1959)

Anne Robb (born 27 July 1959) is a British former alpine skier who competed in the 1976 Winter Olympics and in the 1980 Winter Olympics.
