= Axamer Lizum =

Village and ski resort in Tyrol, Austria

- Village
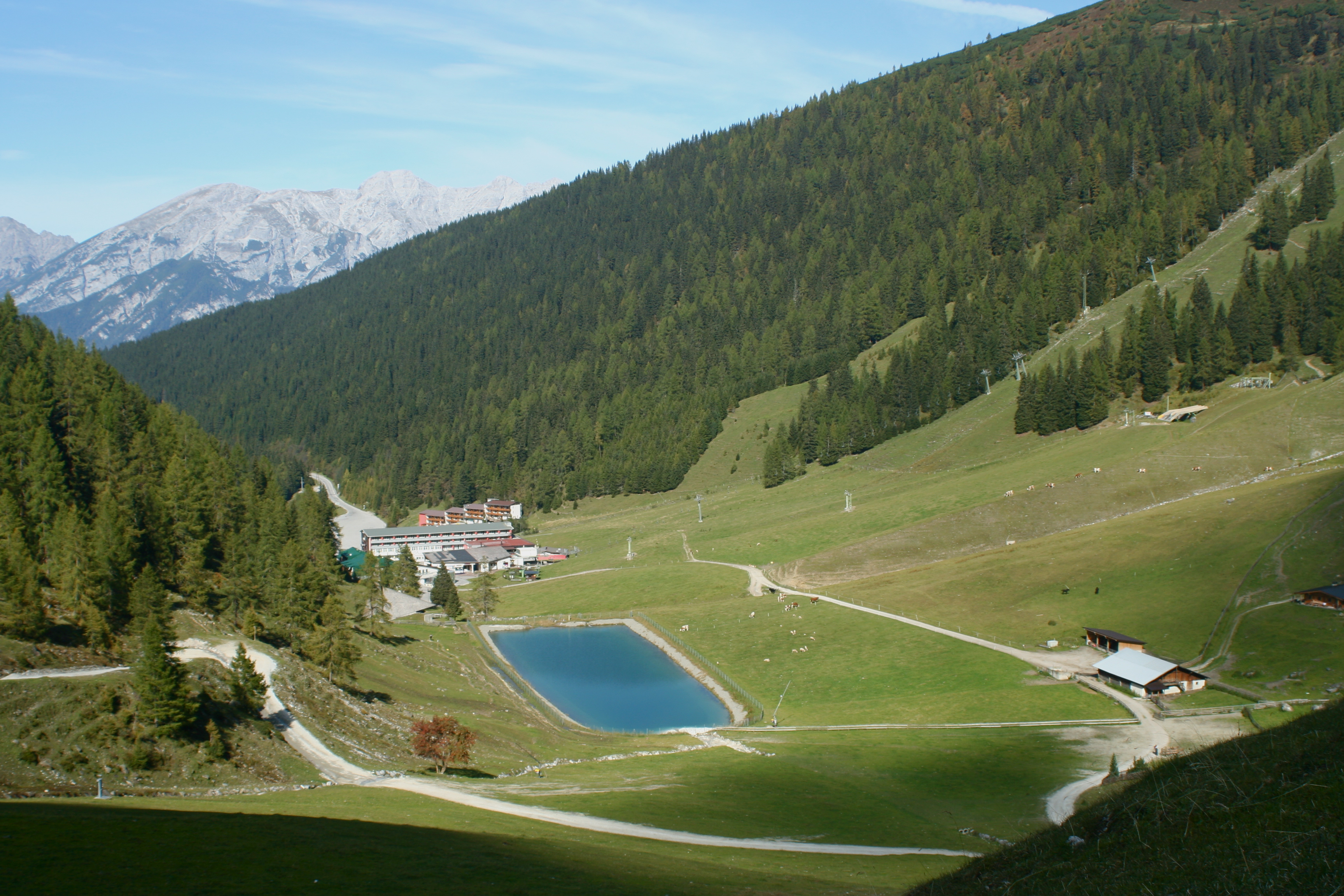
- Axamer Lizum from the south
- Nickname: White Roof of the Innsbruck Olympic Region
- Location within Austria
- Coordinates: 47°11′45″N 11°18′5″E
- Country: Austria
- State: Tyrol
- District: Innsbruck Land
- Municipality: Axams
- Website: www.axamer-lizum.at

Axamer Lizum is a village and ski resort in Tyrol, Austria, located southwest of the state capital Innsbruck. Known for its high-altitude terrain and long-lasting seasonal snow, Axamer Lizum features a variety of pistes and freeriding areas. It also hosted alpine skiing events during the 1964 and 1976 Winter Olympics.

== History ==
At the 1964 Winter Olympics, Axamer Lizum hosted five of the six alpine skiing events: women's downhill, and men's and women's slalom and giant slalom. Men's downhill was held at Patscherkofel. Twelve years later in 1976, Axamer Lizum hosted the same alpine skiing events.

== Geography ==
Axamer Lizum is located in the Stubai Alps, approximately 19 to 20 kilometres (12 to 12 mi) southwest of the Tyrolean capital of Innsbruck. The altitude of the ski area ranges from 1,540 to 2,340 metres (5,050 to 7,680 ft). The highest location of the ski area is the mountain Hoadl at an altitude of 2,340 metres, which is relatively high for a ski area in this region of the Alps. Axamer Lizum therefore has a reputation of being among the last non-glacier-based ski resorts in northern Tyrol to have sufficient snow for winter sport at the end of winter. It is accordingly nicknamed the "white roof" of the Innsbruck Olympic Region.

== Tourism ==
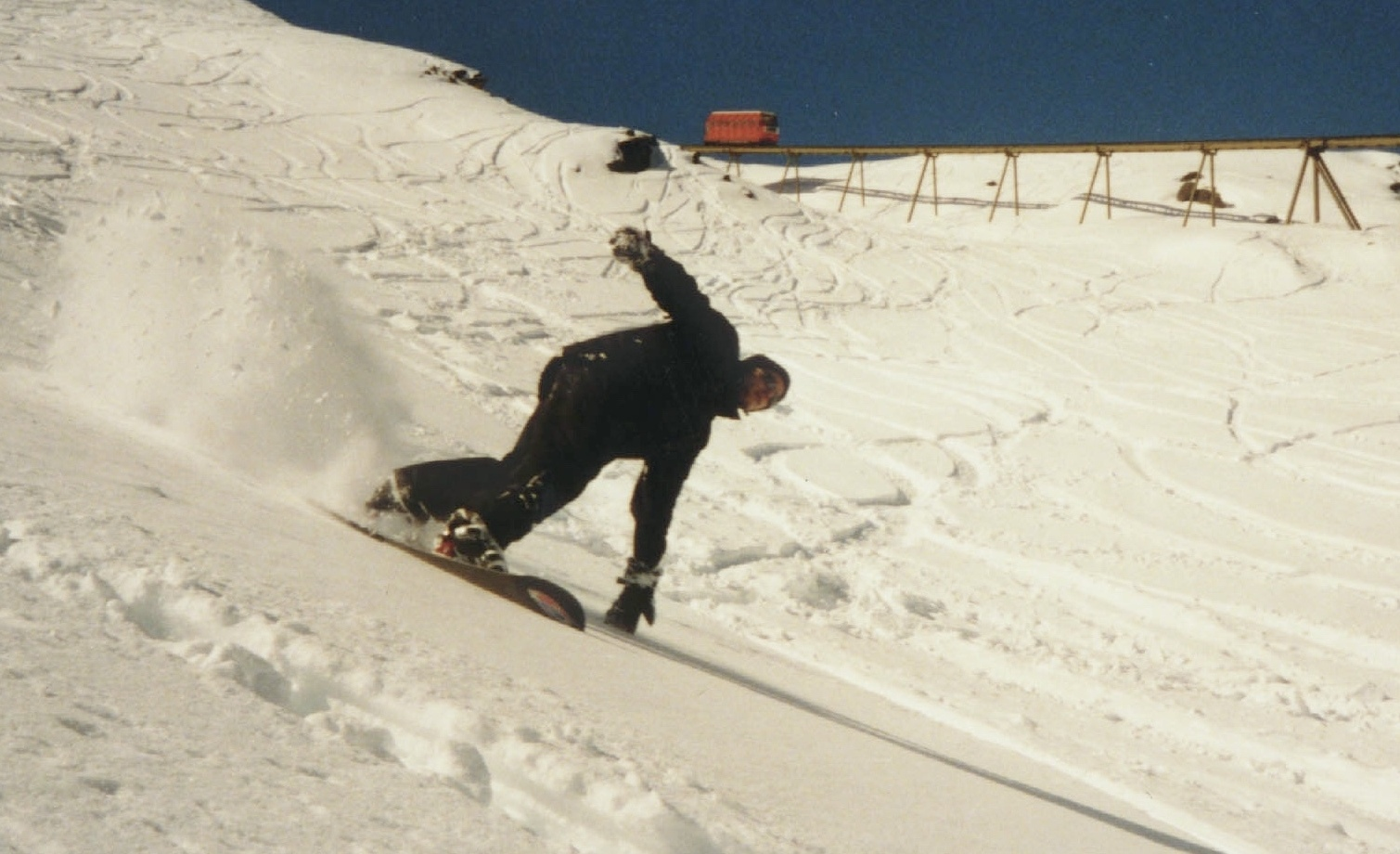
A snowboarder freeriding in deep snow. In the background, the Olympiabahn funicular built for the 1976 Olympics can be seen.

Axamer Lizum is known for its variety of options for skiing or snowboarding off the marked piste (freeriding). The ski area has 40 kilometres (25 mi) of slopes which offer a number of pistes for beginner, advanced, and expert skiers, but most runs are of medium difficulty.

The Hoadl-Haus panorama restaurant on Hoadl mountain has the largest covered sun terrace in Austria, at an altitude of 2,340 metres.

== Transport ==
A shuttle bus runs between Axamer Lizum and Innsbruck during operational days.
