= Torill Fjeldstad =

Norwegian alpine skier (born 1958)

Torill Fjeldstad (born February 22, 1958) is a former Norwegian alpine skier. She was born in Oslo. In the early 1980s she belonged to the downhill world elite. By the pass of her career she achieved five podium places in the World Cup:

- 1975: 3rd place in slalom in Garmisch-Partenkirchen
- 1981: 2nd place in Piancavallo (Italy) and two third places in Altenmarkt-Zauchensee (Austria) and in Mégève (France)
- 1982: 3rd place in Aspen (USA)

At the 1980 Winter Olympics in Lake Placid she finished seventh in the downhill race. At the World Championships 1982 in Schladming she so nearly made the downhill podium she finished 4th in the downhill race. She retired as an alpine skier in 1984.
