= New Zealand at the 1976 Winter Olympics =

- IOC code: NZL
- NOC: New Zealand Olympic Committee
- Website: www.olympic.org.nz

in Innsbruck
- Competitors: 5 (3 men, 2 women) in 1 sport
- Flag bearer: Stuart Blakely
- Medals: Gold 0 Silver 0 Bronze 0 Total 0

Winter Olympics appearances (overview)
- 1952; 1956; 1960; 1964; 1968; 1972; 1976; 1980; 1984; 1988; 1992; 1994; 1998; 2002; 2006; 2010; 2014; 2018; 2022; 2026; 2030

New Zealand competed at the 1976 Winter Olympics in Innsbruck, Austria.

== Alpine skiing ==
Men

Athlete	Event	Race 1		Race 2		Total	
Athlete	Event	Time	Rank	Time	Rank	Time	Rank
Robin Armstrong	Downhill					DNF	–
Brett Kendall	Downhill					2:00.57	60
Stuart Blakely	Downhill					1:57.91	53
Robin Armstrong	Giant Slalom	DNF	–	–	–	DNF	–
Stuart Blakely	Giant Slalom	2:02.12	68	DNF	–	DNF	–
Brett Kendall	Giant Slalom	2:01.82	66	2:02.23	43	4:04.05	44
Robin Armstrong	Slalom	DNF	–	–	–	DNF	–
Brett Kendall	Slalom	1:18.12	42	1:20.26	36	2:38.38	36
Stuart Blakely	Slalom	1:13.17	41	1:15.60	34	2:28.77	35

Women

Athlete	Event	Race 1		Race 2		Total	
Athlete	Event	Time	Rank	Time	Rank	Time	Rank
Sue Gibson	Downhill					2:03.49	38
Sue Gibson	Giant Slalom					1:49.30	42
Janet Wells	Giant Slalom					1:48.42	41
Sue Gibson	Slalom	1:02.59	28	1:00.94	20	2:03.53	19
