= Valentina Iliffe =

British alpine skier (born 1956)

Valentina Iliffe (born 17 February 1956 in Sydney, Australia) is a British former alpine skier who competed in the 1972 Winter Olympics, in the 1976 Winter Olympics, and in the 1980 Winter Olympics.
