= 1976 Winter Olympics =

Multi-sport event in Innsbruck, Austria

XII Olympic Winter Games
- Emblem of the 1976 Winter Olympics (Note: The emblem represents the coat of arms of Innsbruck, which shows the bridge on the Inn River that connects the old town and the Hötting district. The bridge and the Olympic rings symbolize the link that ties the many peoples of the world with friendship through the Olympic Games. The top of the coat of arms has two indents which match two of the Olympic rings and represent the 1964 and 1976 Winter Games which Innsbruck celebrates.)
- Location: Innsbruck, Austria
- Nations: 37
- Athletes: 1,129 (898 men, 231 women)
- Events: 37 in 6 sports (10 disciplines)
- Opening: 4 February 1976
- Closing: 15 February 1976
- Opened by: President Rudolf Kirchschläger
- Closed by: IOC President Lord Killanin
- Cauldron: Christl Haas; Josef Feistmantl
- Stadium: Bergiselschanze

The 1976 Winter Olympics, officially known as the XII Olympic Winter Games (German: XII. Olympische Winterspiele, French: XIIes Jeux olympiques d'hiver) and commonly known as Innsbruck 1976 (Austro-Bavarian: Innschbruck 1976), were a winter multi-sport event celebrated in Innsbruck, Austria, from February 4 to 15, 1976. The games were awarded to Innsbruck after Denver, the original host city, withdrew in 1972. This was the second time the Tyrolean capital had hosted the Winter Olympics, having first done so in 1964.

== Host selection ==
The cities of Denver, Colorado, United States; Sion, Switzerland; Tampere, Finland; and Vancouver (with most events near Mount Garibaldi), British Columbia, Canada, made bids for the Games. The host was decided at the 69th IOC meeting in Amsterdam, Netherlands, on May 12, 1970. Denver planned to hold its games between February 12 and 22, 1976.

Original 1976 Winter Olympics bidding results
City	Country	Round		
City	Country	1	2	3
Denver	United States	29	29	39
Sion	Switzerland	18	31	30
Tampere	Finland	12	8	—
Vancouver—Garibaldi	Canada	9	—	—

In a statewide referendum on 7 November 1972, Colorado voters rejected funding for the games, and for the first (and only) time a city awarded the Winter Games rejected them. Denver officially withdrew on 15 November, and original runner-up Sion declined to host the Olympics. Afterwards, the IOC then offered the games to Whistler, British Columbia, Canada, but they too declined owing to a change of government following elections. Salt Lake City offered to host the games, then pulled its bid and was replaced by Lake Placid, New York. Still reeling from the Denver rejection, the IOC declined and on 4 February 1973, selected Innsbruck, Austria, which had hosted nine years earlier in 1964.

== Mascot ==
The mascot of the 1976 Winter Olympics was Schneemann, a snowman in a red Tyrolean hat. Designed by Walter Pötsch, Schneeman was purported to represent the 1976 Games as the "Games of Simplicity". It was also regarded as a good-luck charm, to avert the dearth of snow that had marred the 1964 Winter Olympics in Innsbruck. There was a second mascot called Sonnenweiberl ("sun wife").

== Highlights ==
The official poster of the 1976 Winter Olympics

- First Games under the presidency of Michael Morris, 3rd Baron Killanin
- Austrian favorite Franz Klammer won the men's downhill event in alpine skiing in 1:45.73, after great pressure from his country and defending champion Bernhard Russi of Switzerland.
- Dorothy Hamill of the United States won the gold in figure skating and inspired the popular "wedge" haircut.
- Elegant British figure skater John Curry altered his routine to appeal to Olympic judges, winning gold.
- American figure skater Terry Kubicka attempted – and completed – a dangerous backflip in figure skating.
- Rosi Mittermaier of West Germany nearly swept the women's alpine skiing events, earning two golds and a silver, missing the third gold by 0.13 seconds.
- Soviet speed skater Tatiana Averina won four medals.
- In the 4-man bobsled, the East German team won the first of three consecutive titles.
- The USSR won its fourth straight ice hockey gold medal; for the second consecutive Olympics, Canada refused to send a team, protesting the rules that allowed the USSR to field professional players while limiting Canada to amateurs. Sweden also joined the boycott.
- Sports technology, in the guise of innovative perforated skis, sleek hooded suits and streamlined helmets appeared in alpine skiing, speed skating and ski jumping, making headlines in Innsbruck.
- A second cauldron for the Olympic flame was built to represent the 1976 Games. Both it and the cauldron from the 1964 games were lit together.
- Bobsleigh and luge competed on the same track for the first time ever.
- Galina Kulakova of the Soviet Union finished 3rd in the women's 5 km ski event, but was disqualified due to a positive test for banned substance ephedrine. She claimed that this was a result of using the nasal spray that contained the substance. Both the FIS and the IOC allowed her to compete in the 10 km and the 4×5 km relay. This was the first stripped medal at the Winter Olympics.
- The Austrian anthem was played three times at the closing ceremony during the beginning, the victory ceremony and the handover ceremony to honor the three verses of the anthem.

== Venues ==
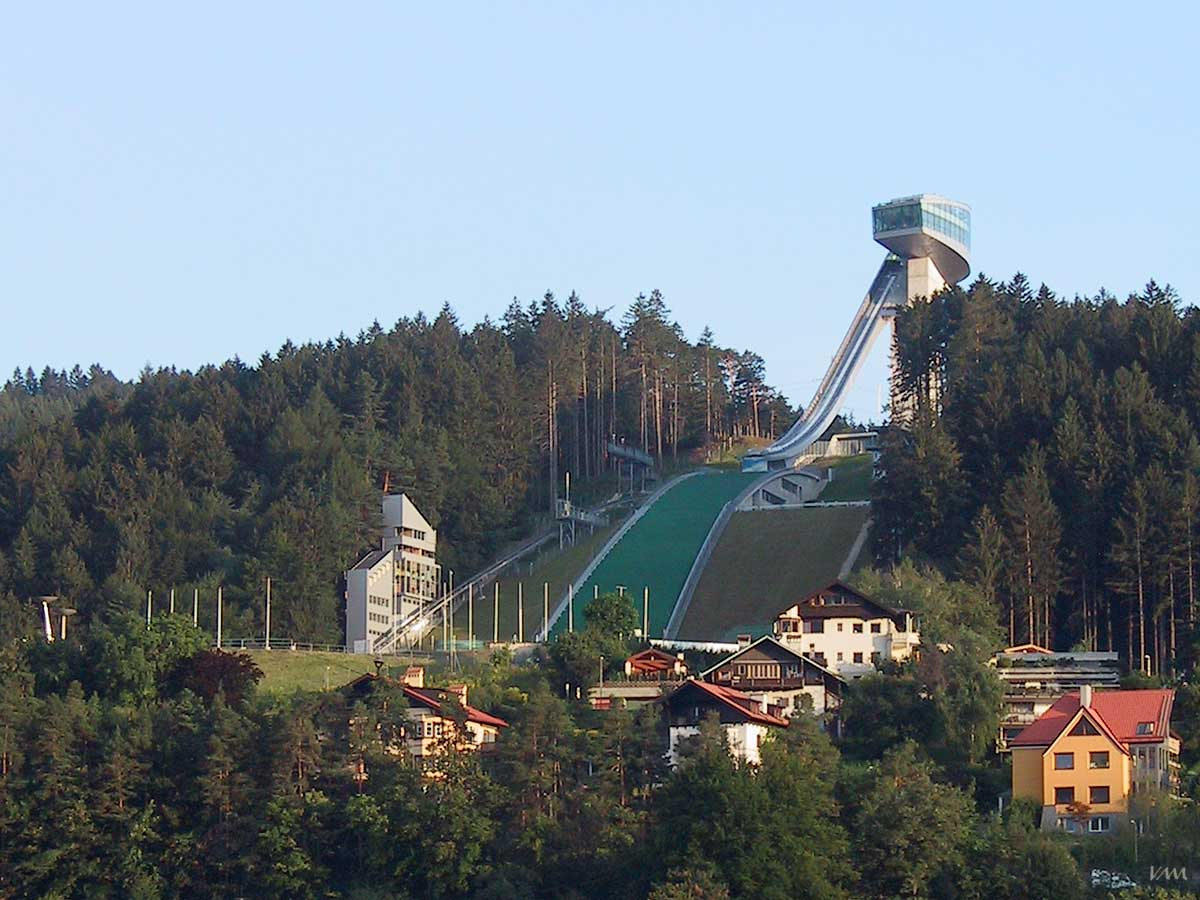
Bergisel in 2004

- Axamer Lizum – Alpine skiing except men's downhill
- Bergiselschanze – Ski jumping (large hill), opening ceremonies
- Eisschnellaufbahn – Speed skating
- Kombinierte Kunsteisbahn für Bob-Rodel Igls – Bobsleigh, Luge
- Messehalle – Ice hockey
- Olympiahalle – Figure skating, Ice hockey, closing ceremonies
- Patscherkofel – Alpine skiing (men's downhill)
- Seefeld – Biathlon, Cross-country skiing, Nordic combined, Ski jumping (normal hill)

== Medals awarded ==
There were 37 events contested in 6 sports (10 disciplines). Ice dance made its Olympic debut. See the medal winners, ordered by sport:

- Alpine skiing (6) ()
- Biathlon (2) ()
- Bobsleigh (2) ()
- Cross-country skiing (7) ()
- Figure skating (4) ()
- Ice hockey (1) ()
- Luge (3) ()
- Nordic combined (1) ()
- Ski jumping (2) ()
- Speed skating (9) ()

== Participating nations ==
37 nations participated in the 1976 Winter Olympic Games. The games marked the final time the Republic of China (Taiwan) participated under the Republic of China flag and name. After most of the international community recognized the People's Republic of China as the legitimate government of all China, the ROC was forced to compete under the name Chinese Taipei, under an altered flag and to use its National Banner Song instead of its national anthem. Andorra and San Marino participated in their first Winter Olympic Games.

Participating National Olympic Committees
- Andorra (5)
- Argentina (8)
- Australia (8)
- Austria (77) (host)
- Belgium (4)
- Bulgaria (29)
- Canada (59)
- Chile (5)
- Czechoslovakia (58)
- East Germany (59)
- Finland (47)
- France (35)
- Great Britain (42)
- Greece (4)
- Hungary (3)
- Iceland (8)
- Iran (4)
- Italy (58)
- Japan (58)
- Lebanon (1)
- Liechtenstein (9)
- Netherlands (7)
- New Zealand (5)
- Norway (42)
- Poland (56)
- Republic of China (6)
- Romania (32)
- San Marino (2)
- South Korea (3)
- Soviet Union (79)
- Spain (4)
- Sweden (39)
- Switzerland (59)
- Turkey (9)
- United States (106)
- West Germany (71)
- Yugoslavia (28)

=== Number of athletes by National Olympic Committees ===
IOC Letter Code	Country	Athletes
USA	United States	106
URS	Soviet Union	79
AUT	Austria	77
GER	West Germany	71
CAN	Canada	59
GDR	East Germany	59
SUI	Switzerland	59
TCH	Czechoslovakia	58
ITA	Italy	58
JPN	Japan	58
POL	Poland	56
FIN	Finland	47
GBR	Great Britain	42
NOR	Norway	42
SWE	Sweden	39
FRA	France	35
ROM	Romania	32
BUL	Bulgaria	29
YUG	Yugoslavia	28
ARG	Argentina	9
LIE	Liechtenstein	9
TUR	Turkey	9
AUS	Australia	8
HOL	Netherlands	7
ROC	Republic of China	6
ISL	Iceland	6
AND	Andorra	5
CHI	Chile	5
NZL	New Zealand	5
BEL	Belgium	4
GRE	Greece	4
IRN	Iran	4
ESP	Spain	4
HUN	Hungary	3
KOR	South Korea	3
SMR	San Marino	3
LIB	Lebanon	1
Total		1,123

== Medal table ==
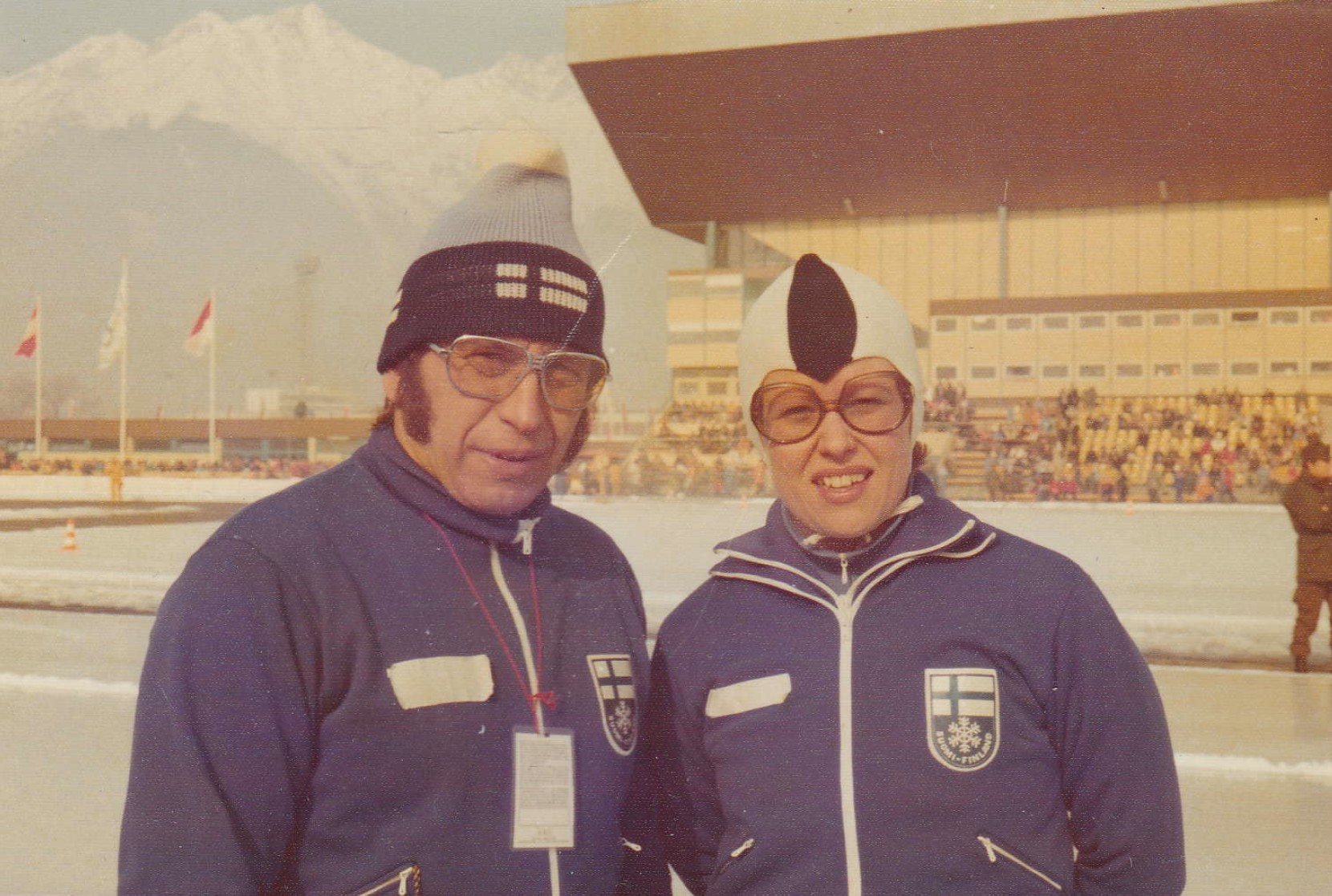
Pentti Peltoperä and Tuula Vilkas who represented Finland in speed skating events

These are the top ten nations that won medals at the 1976 Winter Games.

* Host nation (Austria)

Rank	Nation	Gold	Silver	Bronze	Total
1	Soviet Union	13	6	8	27
2	East Germany	7	5	7	19
3	United States	3	3	4	10
4	Norway	3	3	1	7
5	West Germany	2	5	3	10
6	Finland	2	4	1	7
7	Austria*	2	2	2	6
8	Switzerland	1	3	1	5
9	Netherlands	1	2	3	6
10	Italy	1	2	1	4
Totals (10 entries)		35	35	31	101

== Official film ==
In 1977, White Rock, the official documentary film about the Innsbruck 1976 Winter Olympics was released. The film was narrated by James Coburn, and directed by Tony Maylam. It was nominated for the Robert Flaherty Award (Feature Length Film, Documentary In Content) at the 30th British Academy Film Awards. The film's soundtrack was composed by English keyboardist Rick Wakeman. His album, White Rock entered the UK Albums Chart on 12 February 1977, where it spent 9 weeks and reached number 14.

== See also ==
- 1976 Winter Paralympics
- 1976 Summer Paralympics
- 1976 Summer Olympics
- Olympic Games held in Austria
  - 1964 Winter Olympics – Innsbruck
  - 1976 Winter Olympics – Innsbruck
  - 2012 Winter Youth Olympics – Innsbruck
- List of IOC country codes

Winter Olympics
Preceded by Sapporo	XII Olympic Winter Games; Innsbruck; 1976	Succeeded by Lake Placid
