= Greece at the 1998 Winter Olympics =

- IOC code: GRE
- NOC: Committee of the Olympic Games
- Website: www.hoc.gr (in Greek and English)

in Nagano, Japan
- Competitors: 13 (10 men, 3 women) in 6 sports
- Flag bearer: Vasilios Dimitriadis (alpine skiing)
- Medals: Gold 0 Silver 0 Bronze 0 Total 0

Winter Olympics appearances (overview)
- 1936; 1948; 1952; 1956; 1960; 1964; 1968; 1972; 1976; 1980; 1984; 1988; 1992; 1994; 1998; 2002; 2006; 2010; 2014; 2018; 2022; 2026

Greece was represented at the 1998 Winter Olympics in Nagano, Japan by the Hellenic Olympic Committee.

In total, 13 athletes represented Greece in six different sports including alpine skiing, biathlon, bobsleigh, cross-country skiing, luge and snowboarding.

== Competitors ==
In total, 13 athletes represented Greece at the 1998 Winter Olympics in Nagano, Japan across six different sports.

Sport	Men	Women	Total
Alpine skiing	1	1	2
Biathlon	1	0	1
Bobsleigh	4	–	4
Cross-country skiing	1	1	2
Luge	1	0	1
Snowboarding	2	1	3
Total	10	3	13

== Alpine skiing ==
Two Greek athletes participated in the alpine skiing events – Vasilios Dimitriadis and Sofia Mistrioti.

The women's giant slalom took place on 20 February 1998. Mistrioti completed her first run in one minute 39.76 seconds and her second run in one minute 52.44 seconds for a combined time of three minutes 32.2 seconds to finish 34th overall.

The men's slalom took place on 21 February 1998. Dimitriadis did not finish his first run and did not take part in the second runs.

Men

Athlete	Event	Race 1	Race 2	Total	
Athlete	Event	Time	Time	Time	Rank
Vasilios Dimitriadis	Slalom	DNF	–	DNF	–

Women

Athlete	Event	Race 1	Race 2	Total	
Athlete	Event	Time	Time	Time	Rank
Sofia Mistrioti	Giant Slalom	1:39.76	1:52.44	3:32.20	34

== Biathlon ==
One Greek athlete participated in the biathlon events – Thanasis Tsakiris.

The men's individual took place on 11 February 1998. Tsakiris completed the course in one hour one minute 38.8 seconds but with five shooting misses for an adjusted time of one hour six minutes 38.8 seconds to finish 65th overall.

The men's sprint took place on 18 February 1998. Tsakiris completed the course in 31 minutes 14.6 seconds with two shooting misses to finish 58th overall.

Men

Event	Athlete	Misses ^{1}	Time	Rank
10 km Sprint	Thanasis Tsakiris	2	31:14.6	58

Event	Athlete	Time	Misses	Adjusted time ^{2}	Rank
20 km	Thanasis Tsakiris	1'01:38.8	5	1'06:38.8	65

^{1} A penalty loop of 150 metres had to be skied per missed target.
^{2} One minute added per missed target.

== Bobsleigh ==
Four Greek athletes participated in the bobsleigh events – John-Andrew Kambanis, Peter Kolotouros, Anastasios Papakonstantinou and Greg Sebald.

The two-man bobsleigh took place on 14 and 15 February 1998. The first two runs took place on 14 February and the last two runs on 15 February. In their first run, Sebald and Kambanis completed the course in 56.62 seconds. They completed their second run in 57.13 seconds. They completed run three in 56.45 seconds and their final run – which was the fastest of the four – in 56.37 seconds. Their total time of three minutes 46.57 seconds saw them finish in 30th place overall.

The four-man bobsleigh took place on 20 and 21 February 1998. The first two runs took place on 20 February and the last two runs on 21 February. In their first run, Sebald, Papakonstantinou, Kolotouros and Kambanis completed the course in 55.94 seconds. The second runs were cancelled due to bad weather. They completed run three in 56.18 seconds and their final run in 56.14 seconds. Their total time of two minutes 48.26 seconds saw them finish in 31st place overall.

Sled	Athletes	Event	Run 1		Run 2		Run 3		Run 4		Total	
Sled	Athletes	Event	Time	Rank	Time	Rank	Time	Rank	Time	Rank	Time	Rank
GRE-1	Greg Sebald; John-Andrew Kambanis	Two-man	56.62	31	57.13	36	56.45	31	56.37	31	3:46.57	30

Sled	Athletes	Event	Run 1		Run 2		Run 3		Total	
Sled	Athletes	Event	Time	Rank	Time	Rank	Time	Rank	Time	Rank
GRE-1	Greg Sebald; Anastasios Papakonstantinou; Peter Kolotouros; John-Andrew Kambanis	Four-man	55.94	31	56.18	32	56.14	31	2:48.26	31

== Cross-country skiing ==
Two Greek athletes participated in the cross-country skiing events – Katerina Anastasiou and Lefteris Fafalis.

The women's 5 km classical took place on 9 February 1998. Anastasiou completed the course in 23 minutes 15.8 seconds to finish 79th and last overall.

The men's 10 km classical took place on 12 February 1998. Fafalis completed the course in 34 minutes 13.7 seconds to finish 86th overall.

Men

Event	Athlete	Race	
Event	Athlete	Time	Rank
10 km C	Lefteris Fafalis	34:13.7	86

C = Classical style, F = Freestyle

Women

Event	Athlete	Race	
Event	Athlete	Time	Rank
5 km C	Katerina Anastasiou	23:15.8	79

C = Classical style, F = Freestyle

== Luge ==
One Greek athlete participated in the luge events – Spyros Pinas.

The men's singles took place on 8 and 9 February 1998. The first two runs took place on 8 February and the last two runs on 9 February. In his first run, Pinas completed the course in 51.628 seconds. His second run was the fastest of the four at 51.123 seconds. He completed run three in 51.335 seconds and his final run was 51.294 seconds. His total time of three minutes 25.38 seconds saw him finish in 24th place overall.

Men

Athlete	Run 1		Run 2		Run 3		Run 4		Total	
Athlete	Time	Rank	Time	Rank	Time	Rank	Time	Rank	Time	Rank
Spyros Pinas	51.628	28	51.123	24	51.335	22	51.294	23	3:25.380	24

== Snowboarding ==
Three Greek athletes participated in the snowboarding events – Markos Khatzikyriakis, Stergios Pappos and Marousa Pappou.

The men's giant slalom took place on 8 February 1998. Khatzikyriakis completed his first run in one minute 6.4 seconds. Pappos did not finish his first run and did not take part in the second runs. Khatzikyriakis did not finish his second run.

The women's giant slalom took place on 9 February 1998. Pappou completed her first run in one minute 33.55 seconds and her second run in one minute 22.98 seconds for a combined time of two minutes 56.53 seconds to finish 21st overall.

Men's giant slalom

Athlete	Race 1	Race 2	Total	
Athlete	Time	Time	Time	Rank
Stergios Pappos	DNF	–	DNF	–
Markos Khatzikyriakis	1:06.40	DNF	DNF	–

Women's giant slalom

Athlete	Race 1	Race 2	Total	
Athlete	Time	Time	Time	Rank
Marousa Pappou	1:33.55	1:22.98	2:56.53	21
