= Greece at the 2002 Winter Olympics =

- IOC code: GRE
- NOC: Hellenic Olympic Committee
- Website: www.hoc.gr (in Greek and English)

in Salt Lake City United States
- Competitors: 10 (6 men, 4 women) in 5 sports
- Flag bearer: Lefteris Fafalis (cross-country skiing)
- Medals: Gold 0 Silver 0 Bronze 0 Total 0

Winter Olympics appearances (overview)
- 1936; 1948; 1952; 1956; 1960; 1964; 1968; 1972; 1976; 1980; 1984; 1988; 1992; 1994; 1998; 2002; 2006; 2010; 2014; 2018; 2022; 2026

Greece competed at the 2002 Winter Olympics in Salt Lake City, United States. Cindy Ninos finished 13th in the women's skeleton event, which is the best result for Greece at the history of the Winter Olympic Games.

== Alpine skiing ==
Men

Athlete	Event	Race 1	Race 2	Total	
Athlete	Event	Time	Time	Time	Rank
Vasilios Dimitriadis	Super-G			DNF	–
Vasilios Dimitriadis	Giant Slalom	1:19.30	1:16.85	2:36.15	43
Vasilios Dimitriadis	Slalom	55.24	DSQ	DSQ	–

Women

Athlete	Event	Race 1	Race 2	Total	
Athlete	Event	Time	Time	Time	Rank
Konstantina Koutra	Slalom	1:09.19	1:09.41	2:18.60	37

== Biathlon ==
Men

Event	Athlete	Misses ^{1}	Time	Rank
10 km sprint	Stavros Khristoforidis	2	31:51.4	85

Event	Athlete	Time	Misses	Adjusted time ^{3}	Rank
20 km	Stavros Khristoforidis	1'03:09.5	5	1'08:09.5	85

Women

Event	Athlete	Misses ^{1}	Time	Rank
7.5 km sprint	Despoina Vavatsi	2	27:11.3	70

Event	Athlete	Time	Misses	Adjusted time ^{3}	Rank
15 km	Despoina Vavatsi	57:39.4	7	1'04:39.4	68

^{1} A penalty loop of 150 metres had to be skied per missed target.
^{3} One minute added per missed target.

== Bobsleigh ==
Men

Sled	Athletes	Event	Run 1		Run 2		Run 3		Run 4		Total	
Sled	Athletes	Event	Time	Rank	Time	Rank	Time	Rank	Time	Rank	Time	Rank
GRE-1	John-Andrew Kambanis; Ioannis Leivaditis	Two-man	49.03	31	49.06	31	49.60	32	48.97	30	3:16.66	31

== Cross-country skiing ==
Men

Sprint

Athlete	Qualifying round		Quarter finals		Semi finals		Finals	
Athlete	Time	Rank	Time	Rank	Time	Rank	Time	Final rank
Lefteris Fafalis	3:01.98	41	did not advance					

Pursuit

Athlete	10 km C		10 km F pursuit^{1}	
Athlete	Time	Rank	Time	Final rank
Lefteris Fafalis	31:11.7	68	did not advance	

Event	Athlete	Race	
Event	Athlete	Time	Rank
15 km C	Lefteris Fafalis	46:17.9	65

^{1} Starting delay based on 10 km C. results.
C = Classical style, F = Freestyle

Women

Sprint

Athlete	Qualifying round		Quarter finals		Semi finals		Finals	
Athlete	Time	Rank	Time	Rank	Time	Rank	Time	Final rank
Katerina Balkaba	4:06.99	57	did not advance					

Pursuit

Athlete	5 km C		5 km F pursuit^{2}	
Athlete	Time	Rank	Time	Final rank
Katerina Balkaba	18:48.9	71	did not advance	

^{2} Starting delay based on 5 km C. results.
C = Classical style, F = Freestyle

== Skeleton ==
Men

Athlete	Run 1		Run 2		Total	
Athlete	Time	Rank	Time	Rank	Time	Rank
Michael Voudouris	54.11	24	54.33	23	1:48.44	23

Women

Athlete	Run 1		Run 2		Total	
Athlete	Time	Rank	Time	Rank	Time	Rank
Cindy Ninos	54.54	13	54.74	13	1:49.28	13
