= Greece at the 1976 Winter Olympics =

- IOC code: GRE
- NOC: Committee of the Olympic Games

in Innsbruck Austria
- Competitors: 4 (men) in 2 sports
- Flag bearer: Spyros Theodorou
- Medals: Gold 0 Silver 0 Bronze 0 Total 0

Winter Olympics appearances (overview)
- 1936; 1948; 1952; 1956; 1960; 1964; 1968; 1972; 1976; 1980; 1984; 1988; 1992; 1994; 1998; 2002; 2006; 2010; 2014; 2018; 2022; 2026

Greece competed at the 1976 Winter Olympics in Innsbruck, Austria.

== Alpine skiing ==
Men

Athlete	Event	Race 1		Race 2		Total	
Athlete	Event	Time	Rank	Time	Rank	Time	Rank
Spyros Theodorou	Downhill					2:17.08	66
Thomas Karadimas	Downhill					2:14.69	65
Thomas Karadimas	Giant Slalom	2:19.06	80	2:34.57	50	4:53.63	50
Spyros Theodorou	Giant Slalom	2:12.79	77	2:16.29	49	4:29.08	49
Thomas Karadimas	Slalom	DNF	–	–	–	DNF	–
Spyros Theodorou	Slalom	DNF	–	–	–	DNF	–

== Cross-country skiing ==
Men

Event	Athlete	Race	
Event	Athlete	Time	Rank
15 km	Athanasios Koutsogiannis	1'07:49.43	78
15 km	Efstathios Vogdanos	1'05:51.28	75
30 km	Efstathios Vogdanos	DNF	–
30 km	Athanasios Koutsogiannis	2'21:20.64	67
