= Greece at the 2010 Winter Olympics =

- IOC code: GRE
- NOC: Hellenic Olympic Committee
- Website: www.hoc.gr (in Greek and English)

in Vancouver Canada
- Competitors: 7 in 3 sports
- Flag bearer: Thanassis Tsakiris
- Medals: Gold 0 Silver 0 Bronze 0 Total 0

Winter Olympics appearances (overview)
- 1936; 1948; 1952; 1956; 1960; 1964; 1968; 1972; 1976; 1980; 1984; 1988; 1992; 1994; 1998; 2002; 2006; 2010; 2014; 2018; 2022; 2026

Greece participated at the 2010 Winter Olympics in Vancouver, British Columbia, Canada.

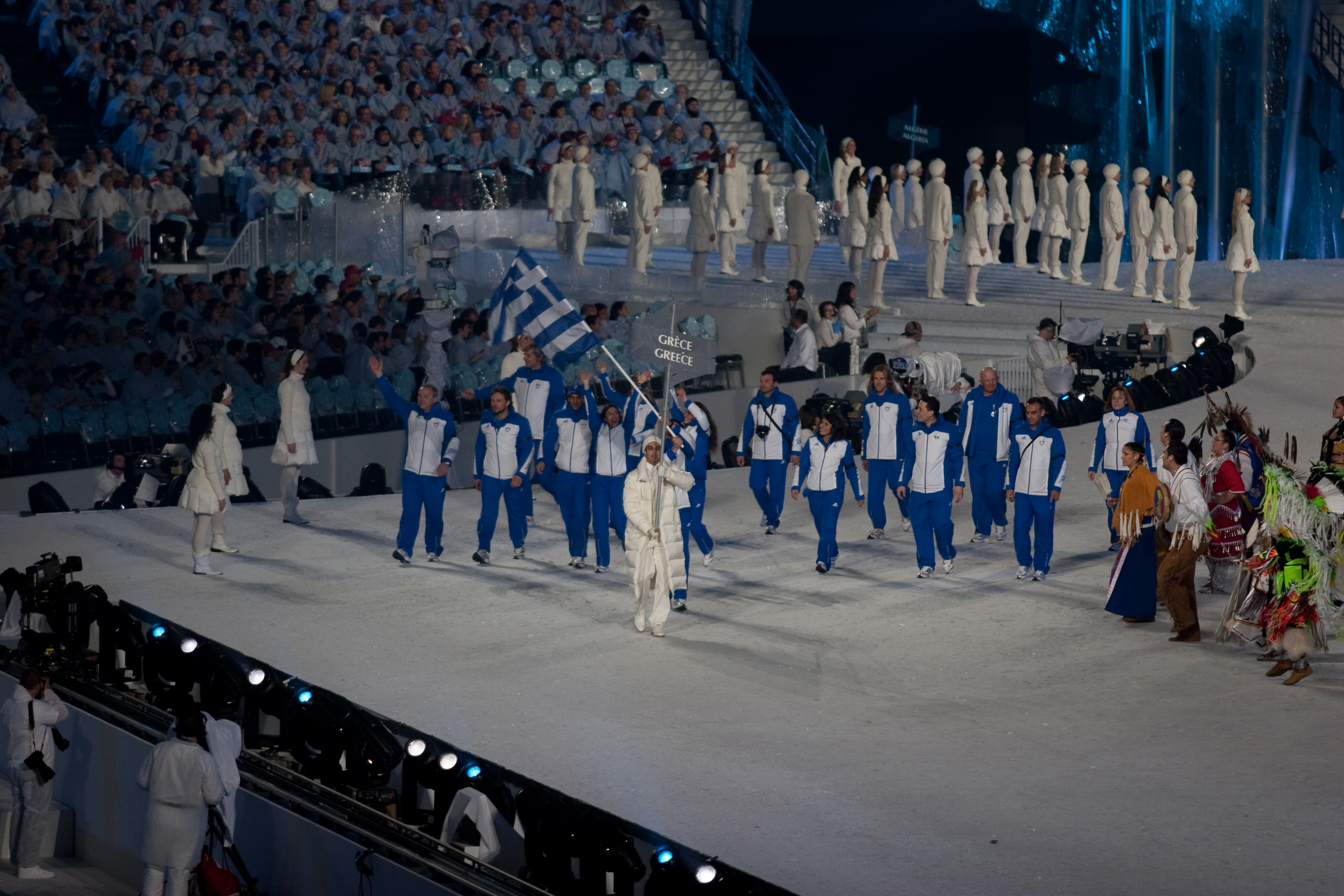
The athletes entering the stadium and leading the parade during the opening ceremonies.

== Alpine skiing ==
Athlete	Event	Run 1	Run 2	Total	Rank
Vassilis Dimitriadis	Men's slalom	51.96	56.20	1:48.16	33
Vassilis Dimitriadis	Men's giant slalom	1:24.64	DNF		DNF
Stefanos Tsimikalis	Men's slalom	DNF			DNF
Stefanos Tsimikalis	Men's giant slalom	1:29.21	1:30.95	3:00.16	65
Sophia Ralli	Women's slalom	59.32	1:01.09	2:00.41	47
Sophia Ralli	Women's giant slalom	1:27.75	1:22.86	2:50.61	53

== Biathlon ==
Athlete	Event	Final		
Athlete	Event	Time	Misses	Rank
Thanassis Tsakiris	Men's sprint			DNF
Panagiota Tsakiri	Women's sprint	24:28.8	1+2	86

== Cross-country skiing ==
Athlete	Event	Qualification		Quarterfinals		Semifinals		Final	
Athlete	Event	Time	Rank	Time	Rank	Time	Rank	Time	Rank
Lefteris Fafalis	Men's sprint	4:39:40	50	did not qualify					50
Maria Danou	Women's 10 kilometre freestyle							32:14.6	73

== See also ==
- Greece at the Olympics
- Greece at the 2010 Winter Paralympics
