= Greece at the 2022 Winter Olympics =

- Flag of Greece
- IOC code: GRE
- NOC: Hellenic Olympic Committee
- Website: www.hoc.gr

in Beijing, China 4–20 February 2022
- Competitors: 5 (2 men and 3 women) in 2 sports
- Flag bearers (opening): Apostolos Angelis; Maria Ntanou
- Flag bearer (closing): Ioannis Antoniou
- Medals: Gold 0 Silver 0 Bronze 0 Total 0

Winter Olympics appearances (overview)
- 1936; 1948; 1952; 1956; 1960; 1964; 1968; 1972; 1976; 1980; 1984; 1988; 1992; 1994; 1998; 2002; 2006; 2010; 2014; 2018; 2022; 2026

Greece competed at the 2022 Winter Olympics in Beijing, China, from 4 to 20 February 2022. As the founding nation of the Olympic Games and in keeping with tradition, Greece entered first during the opening ceremony. Greece has yet to win a medal in the Winter Olympics.

Apostolos Angelis and Maria Ntanou were the country's flagbearer during the opening ceremony. Meanwhile alpine skier Ioannis Antoniou was the flagbearer during the closing ceremony.

== Competitors ==
The following is the list of number of competitors participating at the Games per sport/discipline.

Sport	Men	Women	Total
Alpine skiing	1	1	2
Cross-country skiing	1	2	3
Total	2	3	5

== Alpine skiing ==
By meeting the basic qualification standards Greece qualified one male and one female alpine skier.

Athlete	Event	Run 1		Run 2		Total	
Athlete	Event	Time	Rank	Time	Rank	Time	Rank
Ioannis Antoniou	Men's giant slalom	DNF		did not advance			
Ioannis Antoniou	Men's slalom	59.48	36	54.81	28	1:54.29	29
Maria Tsiovolou	Women's giant slalom	DNF		did not advance			
Maria Tsiovolou	Women's slalom	DNF		did not advance			

== Cross-country skiing ==
Greece qualified one male and two female cross-country skiers.

Due to high winds and adverse weather conditions, the men's 50 km freestyle competition on 19 February was shortened to 28.4 km.

Distance

Athlete	Event	Final		
Athlete	Event	Time	Deficit	Rank
Apostolos Angelis	Men's 50 km freestyle	1:34:04.2	+22:31.5	59
Maria Ntanou	Women's 10 km classical	37:39.4	+9:33.1	88
Maria Ntanou	Women's 30 km freestyle	LAP		61
Nefeli Tita	Women's 10 km classical	42:12.1	+14:05.8	98

Sprint

Athlete	Event	Qualification		Quarterfinal		Semifinal		Final	
Athlete	Event	Time	Rank	Time	Rank	Time	Rank	Time	Rank
Apostolos Angelis	Men's sprint	3:20.87	83	did not advance					
Maria Ntanou	Women's sprint	4:04.66	89	did not advance					
Nefeli Tita	Women's sprint	4:14.48	87	did not advance					
Maria Ntanou; Nefeli Tita	Women's team sprint	—N/a				LAP (4 laps)	13	Did not advance	=23
