= Greece at the 2006 Winter Olympics =

- IOC code: GRE
- NOC: Hellenic Olympic Committee
- Website: www.hoc.gr (in Greek and English)

in Turin Italy
- Competitors: 5 (3 men, 2 women) in 3 sports
- Flag bearers: Eleftherios Fafalis (opening); Vassilis Dimitriadis (closing)
- Medals: Gold 0 Silver 0 Bronze 0 Total 0

Winter Olympics appearances (overview)
- 1936; 1948; 1952; 1956; 1960; 1964; 1968; 1972; 1976; 1980; 1984; 1988; 1992; 1994; 1998; 2002; 2006; 2010; 2014; 2018; 2022; 2026

Greece competed at the 2006 Winter Olympics in Turin, Italy.

== Alpine skiing ==
Athlete	Event	Final				
Athlete	Event	Run 1	Run 2	Run 3	Total	Rank
Vassilis Dimitriadis	Men's giant slalom	did not finish				
Vassilis Dimitriadis	Men's slalom	57.38	54.00	n/a	1:51.38	23
Magdalini Kalomirou	Women's giant slalom	1:15.28	1:21.17	n/a	2:36.45	39
Magdalini Kalomirou	Women's slalom	disqualified				

== Biathlon ==
Athlete	Event	Final		
Athlete	Event	Time	Misses	Rank
Stavros Christoforidis	Men's sprint	32:48.3	3	84
Stavros Christoforidis	Men's individual	1:13:13.3	11	88

== Cross-country skiing ==
Sprint

Athlete	Event	Qualifying		Quarterfinal		Semifinal		Final	
Athlete	Event	Total	Rank	Total	Rank	Total	Rank	Total	Rank
Eleftherios Fafalis	Men's sprint	2:20.33	29 Q	2:26.7	6	Did not advance			29
Panagiota Tsakiri	Women's sprint	2:43.28	66	Did not advance					66
