= Greece at the 1952 Winter Olympics =

- IOC code: GRE
- NOC: Committee of the Olympic Games

in Oslo Norway
- Competitors: 3 (men) in 1 sport
- Flag bearer: Angelos Lembesi
- Medals: Gold 0 Silver 0 Bronze 0 Total 0

Winter Olympics appearances (overview)
- 1936; 1948; 1952; 1956; 1960; 1964; 1968; 1972; 1976; 1980; 1984; 1988; 1992; 1994; 1998; 2002; 2006; 2010; 2014; 2018; 2022; 2026

Greece competed at the 1952 Winter Olympics in Oslo, Norway.

== Alpine skiing ==
Men

Athlete	Event	Race 1		Race 2		Total	
Athlete	Event	Time	Rank	Time	Rank	Time	Rank
Antonios Miliordos	Downhill					DSQ	–
Angelos Lembesi	Downhill					DSQ	–
Alexandros Vouxinos	Downhill					6:10.8	72
Angelos Lembesi	Slalom	DNF	–	did not advance			
Alexandros Vouxinos	Slalom	DNF	–	did not advance			
Antonios Miliordos	Slalom	2:26.9	79	did not advance			

== Sources ==
- Petersen, Rolf, ed. (1952). The Official Report of the Organising Committee of the VIth Winter Olympic Games 1952 at Oslo (PDF). Oslo. Archived from the original (PDF) on 2007-09-30.
- Olympic Winter Games 1952, full results by sports-reference.com
