= Greece at the 2018 Winter Olympics =

- Flag of Greece
- IOC code: GRE
- NOC: Hellenic Olympic Committee
- Website: www.hoc.gr/en

in Pyeongchang, South Korea 9–25 February 2018
- Competitors: 4 (2 men and 2 women) in 2 sports
- Flag bearer: Sophia Ralli
- Medals: Gold 0 Silver 0 Bronze 0 Total 0

Winter Olympics appearances (overview)
- 1936; 1948; 1952; 1956; 1960; 1964; 1968; 1972; 1976; 1980; 1984; 1988; 1992; 1994; 1998; 2002; 2006; 2010; 2014; 2018; 2022; 2026

Greece competed at the 2018 Winter Olympics in Pyeongchang, South Korea, from 9 to 25 February 2018, with four competitors in two sports. As the founding nation of the Olympic Games and in keeping with tradition, Greece entered first during the opening ceremony.

== Competitors ==
The following is the list of number of competitors participating in the delegation per sport.

Sport	Men	Women	Total
Alpine skiing	1	1	2
Cross-country skiing	1	1	2
Total	2	2	4

== Alpine skiing ==
Greece qualified two alpine skiers, one male and one female.

Athlete	Event	Run 1		Run 2		Total	
Athlete	Event	Time	Rank	Time	Rank	Time	Rank
Ioannis Antoniou	Men's giant slalom	1:17.38	56	1:15.92	43	2:33.30	46
Ioannis Antoniou	Men's slalom	DNF					
Sophia Ralli	Women's giant slalom	1:22.46	58	1:19.20	52	2:41.66	52
Sophia Ralli	Women's slalom	57.95	48	57.49	44	1:55.44	44

== Cross-country skiing ==
Greece qualified two athletes, one male and one female.

Distance

Athlete	Event	Final		
Athlete	Event	Time	Deficit	Rank
Apostolos Angelis	Men's 15 km freestyle	38:56.4	+5:12.5	81
Maria Ntanou	Women's 10 km freestyle	31:04.1	+6:03.6	76

Sprint

Athlete	Event	Qualification		Quarterfinal		Semifinal		Final	
Athlete	Event	Time	Rank	Time	Rank	Time	Rank	Time	Rank
Apostolos Angelis	Men's sprint	3:47.10	74	did not advance					

== See also ==
- Greece at the 2018 Summer Youth Olympics
