= Greece at the 2026 Winter Olympics =

- Flag of Greece
- IOC code: GRE
- NOC: Hellenic Olympic Committee
- Website: www.hoc.gr

in Milan and Cortina d'Ampezzo, Italy 6 February 2026 – 22 February 2026
- Competitors: 5 (2 men and 3 women) in 2 sports
- Flag bearer (opening): Nefeli Tita
- Flag bearer (closing): Maria Eleni Tsiovolou
- Medals: Gold 0 Silver 0 Bronze 0 Total 0

Winter Olympics appearances (overview)
- 1936; 1948; 1952; 1956; 1960; 1964; 1968; 1972; 1976; 1980; 1984; 1988; 1992; 1994; 1998; 2002; 2006; 2010; 2014; 2018; 2022; 2026

Greece competed at the 2026 Winter Olympics in Milan and Cortina d'Ampezzo, Italy, which was held from 6 to 22 February 2026. As the founding nation of the Olympic Games and in keeping with tradition, Greece entered the stadium first during the parade of nations at the opening and closing ceremonies.

Nefeli Tita was the country's flag bearer during the opening ceremony and Maria Eleni Tsiovolou during the closing ceremony.

== Competitors ==
The following is the list of number of competitors participating at the Games per sport/discipline.

Sport	Men	Women	Total
Alpine skiing	1	1	2
Cross-country skiing	1	2	3
Total	2	3	5

== Alpine skiing ==
Greece qualified one female and one male alpine skier through the basic quota.

Athlete	Event	Run 1		Run 2		Total	
Athlete	Event	Time	Rank	Time	Rank	Time	Rank
AJ Ginnis	Men's slalom	DNF		Did not advance		DNF	
Maria Eleni Tsiovolou	Women's giant slalom	1:17.44	60	1:24.47	52	2:41.91	53
Maria Eleni Tsiovolou	Women's slalom	DSQ		Did not advance		DSQ	

== Cross-country skiing ==
Greece qualified one female and one male cross-country skier through the basic quota. Following the completion of the 2024–25 FIS Cross-Country World Cup, Greece qualified a further one female athlete.

Distance

Athlete	Event	Final		
Athlete	Event	Time	Deficit	Rank
Apostolos Angelis	Men's 20 km skiathlon	DNS		
Apostolos Angelis	Men's 10 km freestyle	25:05.0	4:28.8	80
Konstantina Charalampidou	Women's 10 km freestyle	28:54.2	6:05.0	86
Nefeli Tita	Women's 10 km freestyle	31:10.8	8:21.6	100

Sprint

Athlete	Event	Qualification		Quarterfinal		Semifinal		Final	
Athlete	Event	Time	Rank	Time	Rank	Time	Rank	Time	Rank
Apostolos Angelis	Men's sprint	4:06.03	92	Did not advance					
Konstantina Charalampidou; Nefeli Tita	Women's team sprint	8:06.30	26	—N/a				Did not advance	

== See also ==
- Greece at the 2026 Winter Paralympics
