= Greece at the 2014 Winter Olympics =

- IOC code: GRE
- NOC: Hellenic Olympic Committee
- Website: www.hoc.gr (in Greek and English)

in Sochi Russia
- Competitors: 7 in 4 sports
- Flag bearer: Panagiota Tsakiri (opening) Alexandros Kefalas (closing)
- Medals: Gold 0 Silver 0 Bronze 0 Total 0

Winter Olympics appearances (overview)
- 1936; 1948; 1952; 1956; 1960; 1964; 1968; 1972; 1976; 1980; 1984; 1988; 1992; 1994; 1998; 2002; 2006; 2010; 2014; 2018; 2022; 2026

Greece competed at the 2014 Winter Olympics in Sochi, Russia, from 7 to 23 February 2014. The Greek team consisted of seven athletes in four sports. As the founding nation of the Olympic Games and in keeping with tradition, Greece entered first during the opening ceremony.

== Alpine skiing ==
According to the final quota allocation released on 20 January 2014, Greece has three athletes in qualification position.

Athlete	Event	Run 1		Run 2		Total	
Athlete	Event	Time	Rank	Time	Rank	Time	Rank
Kostas Sykaras	Men's giant slalom	1:30.75	59	1:31.58	51	3:02.33	52
Kostas Sykaras	Men's slalom	57.83	64	1:06.25	35	2:04.08	36
Kostas Sykaras	Men's super-G	—N/a				1:26.32	52
Massimiliano Valcareggi	Men's giant slalom	1:30.72	58	1:33.64	56	3:04.36	54
Massimiliano Valcareggi	Men's slalom	58.97	68	1:06.75	38	2:05.72	38
Massimiliano Valcareggi	Men's super-G	—N/a				DSQ	
Sophia Ralli	Women's giant slalom	1:33.63	66	1:32.84	56	3:06.47	58
Sophia Ralli	Women's slalom	1:05.20	47	1:01.57	37	2:06.77	38

== Cross-country skiing ==
According to the final quota allocation released on 20 January 2014, Greece had two athletes in qualification position.

Sprint

Athlete	Event	Qualification		Quarterfinal		Semifinal		Final	
Athlete	Event	Time	Rank	Time	Rank	Time	Rank	Time	Rank
Apostolos Angelis	Men's sprint	4:01.87	74	did not advance					
Panagiota Tsakiri	Women's sprint	3:02.75	64	did not advance					

== Skeleton ==
Greece had one athlete in qualification position.

Athlete	Event	Run 1		Run 2		Run 3		Run 4		Total	
Athlete	Event	Time	Rank	Time	Rank	Time	Rank	Time	Rank	Time	Rank
Alexandros Kefalas	Men's	58.20	23	58.33	24	58.22	23	did not advance		2:54.75	23

== Ski jumping ==
Greece received a reallocation quota spot in men's ski jumping.

Athlete	Event	Qualification			First round			Final			Total	
Athlete	Event	Distance	Points	Rank	Distance	Points	Rank	Distance	Points	Rank	Points	Rank
Nico Polychronidis	Men's normal hill	83.5	85.0	48	did not advance							
Nico Polychronidis	Men's large hill	107.5	74.7	47	did not advance							
