= Sadirvan Mosque =

Former mosque in Drama, Greece

- Σαντιρβάν Τζαμί
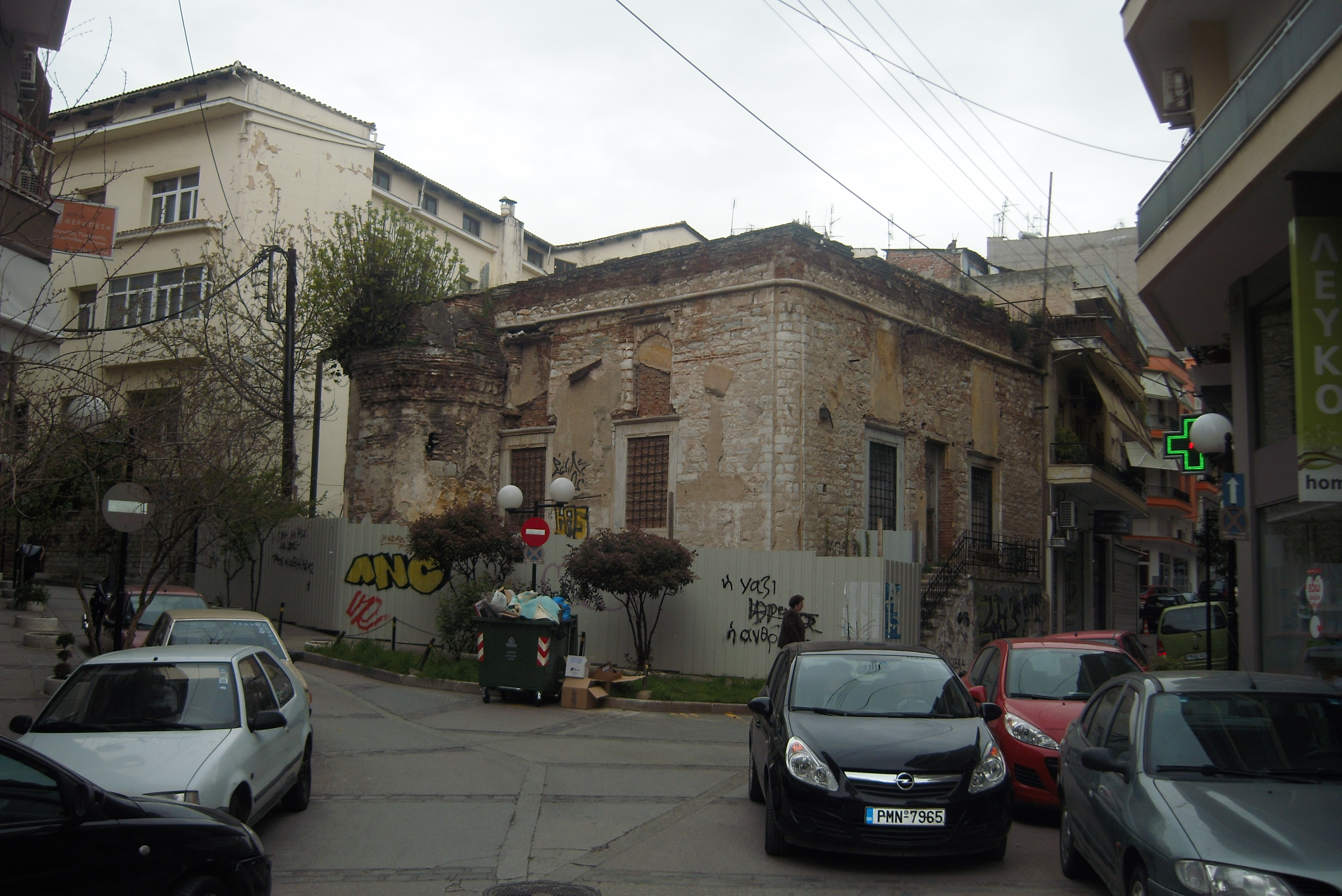
- The mosque in 2012, before restoration

- Location of the former mosque in Greece

Religion
- Affiliation: Islam (former)
- Ecclesiastical or organizational status: Mosque (15th century–1922)
- Status: Abandoned (as a mosque); Repurposed (for cultural use)

Location
- Location: Drama, Eastern Macedonia and Thrace
- Country: Greece
- Interactive map of Sadirvan Mosque
- Coordinates: 41°09′05″N 24°08′54″E

Architecture
- Architect: Koralia Pappaioannou (2010s)
- Type: Mosque
- Style: Ottoman
- Completed: 15th century; 2010s (restoration)

Specifications
- Minaret: 1 (collapsed)
- Materials: Brick; stone

The Sadirvan Mosque (Greek: Σαντιρβάν Τζαμί, from Turkish: Şadırvan Camii, lit. 'mosque of the fountain') is a former mosque in the town of Drama, in the Eastern Macedonia and Thrace region of northern Greece. Built in the 15th century during the Ottoman era, the mosque was abandoned in the 1920s, following the 1923 population exchange between Greece and Turkey which saw the exodus of the Muslim community of Drama.

The building was subsequently repurposed for profane use and then neglected for decades. During the late 2010s, the structure was restored and renovated and repurposed for municipal exhibition center for historical and cultural events. It is one of the four surviving mosques in Drama today, none of which are used for worship any longer.

== History ==
The mosque's minaret dates from the second half of the fifteenth century; according to the dedicatory inscription above its entrance, it was renovated in 1806 by local Mehmet Halil Agha (the father of Mahmud Dramali Pasha, an Ottoman military leader who attempted to suppress the Greek War of Independence in the early 1820s). It continued to function as an Islamic place of worship until 1922, thereupon it was used as shelter for numerous Greek refugees arriving from Asia Minor following the population exchange.

For fifty-four years between 1927 and 1981 it housed the headquarters of Tharros, the longest-running Greek newspaper in Eastern Macedonia and Thrace. Later, in 1983, the building was classified by the state as a monument, but left neglected as it continued to rot until its minaret collapsed. In 2012 it was purchased by Raycap, which proceeded to renovate the old building; Raycap also invited the Benaki Museum to host a number of cultural exhibitions in it. The extensive work was undertaken by the architectural team of Koralia Pappaioannou, and was subsequently repurposed as an exhibition space for periodical exhibitions, particularly centered around Islamic art.

The first of those exhibitions was held in December 2022, titled For the Heirlooms of Asia Minor, commemorating the 100 years since the Greek exodus from Anatolia. In April 2026 it hosted some of the Benaki children's toy collection, while later in June of the same year an equestrian statue of Alexander the Great by Giannis Pappas was placed in the courtyard.

== Architecture ==
The former mosque is made of stone, and has a rectangular parallelepiped shape. On the southwestern side the base of the minaret can be observed, although the minaret no longer stands. A marble inscription written in Ottoman Turkish is placed above the lintel. Originally it was part of a larger complex that included dormitories, a cemetery, and a fountain, all within an enclosed courtyard.

Remarkably, its 19th-century frescoes with cityscape views and floral patterns survive in the portico of the mosque, perhaps constituting the first (if idyllic and idealised) depiction of Drama town from the late Ottoman rule.

According to Papaioannou, during the course of the renovation works several architectural fragments of older structures were discovered as well, which were used as structural elements for the mosque, as well as other pieces of the mosque itself, scattered in the surrounding area.

The exhibition centre stands in the intersection of the Armen and Agamemnon streets.

== See also ==
- Islam in Greece
- List of former mosques in Greece
- Ottoman Greece

== Bibliography ==
- Manent-Triantafyllidi, Sylvie (November 26, 2016). 2500 χρόνια ιστορίας σε 60'. Πολιτιστική Διαδρομή στην πόλη της Δράμας [2500 years of history in 60 minutes: a cultural itinerary in the town of Drama] (PDF) (in Greek). Drama municipality. Archived from the original (PDF) on November 26, 2016.
