= Folklore Museum of Drama =

- Λαογραφικό Μουσείο Δράμας
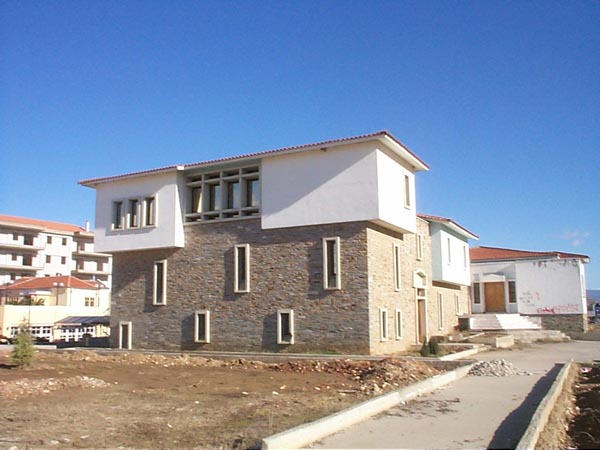
- View from outside
- Established: 2000
- Location: Drama, Greece
- Coordinates: 41.14529139173311°N 24.14727239321713°E
- Type: Art museum

The Folklore Museum of Drama (Greek: Λαογραφικό Μουσείο Δράμας) located in Drama in northern Greece was launched by the Lyceum Club of Greek Women in recent years. It is a project to classify and display its considerable collection of costumes and artifacts of the folk culture of Drama and the wider area. It has devoted a large part of its new, privately owned premises (three floors) to an exhibition of the collection.

== Exhibits ==
The museum has reached the final stages of arranging the exhibits in the showcases and is expected to open its doors to the public in mid-2000. The exhibits include, among many other things, a number of authentic folk costumes from Drama, the surrounding area, and the rest of Greece, old furniture from urban and rural homes, a barrel-organ, and a multitude of old objects.

== Gallery ==
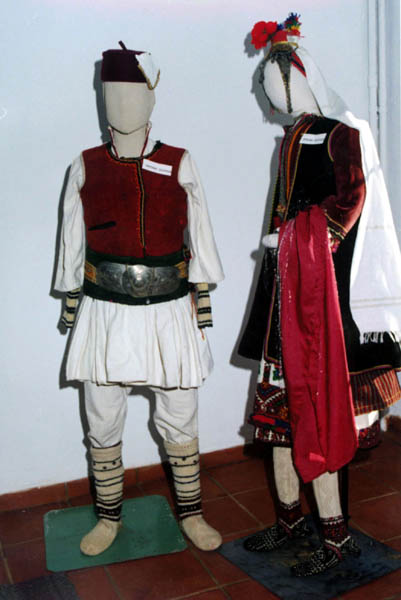
Traditional costumes from Orini

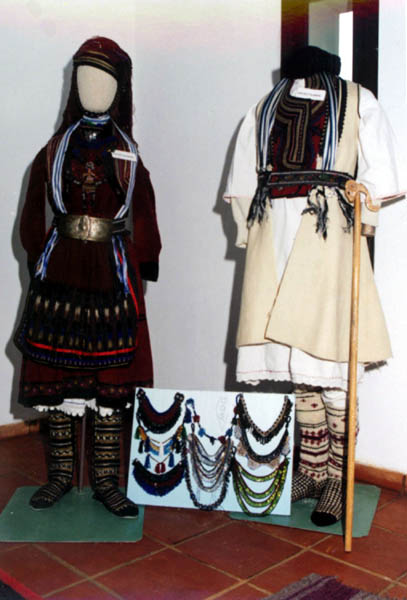
Traditional costumes from Prosotsani

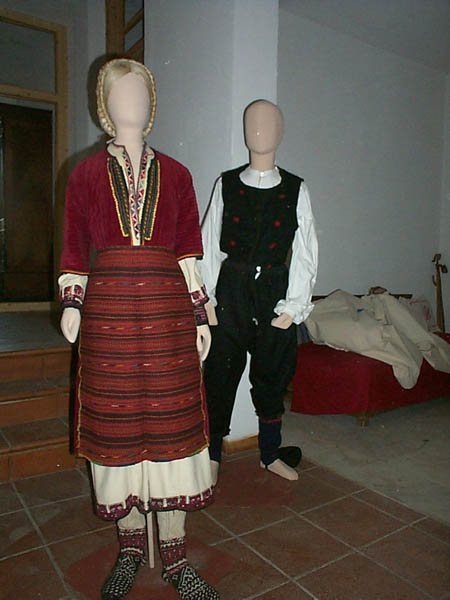
Traditional costumes from Volakas
