= Archaeological Museum of Drama =

Museum in Drama, Greece

Coordinates: 41.1480°N 24.1432°E

The Archaeological Museum of Drama is in the city of Drama in East Macedonia and Thrace, Greece. It was built by the Municipality of Drama and inaugurated on 12 December 1999.

Its exhibits display the cultural history of Drama prefecture from the Middle Palaeolithic to 1914. The oldest finds, bones and stone tools, come from excavations in the cave at the source of the River Angitis (50,000 BC). It also displays tools, jewellery and pots from the prehistoric settlements of Sitagra and Arkadikos (6000–4000 BC) from the Early Bronze Age (many of the pots), the Late Bronze Age (finds from graves at Potami and Exohi), and from the Early Iron Age (pots, weapons, tools, and jewellery from graves in the industrial area of Drama).

The museum also has examples of Attic pottery (6th and 5th century BC); a marble bust of Dionysos, which constitutes the earliest evidence of his cult in the wider area; a hoard of coins of Philip II from an excavation at Potami; and other finds from the ancient settlement of Drama (4th century BC). Most items from the Roman period (such as the bronze statuette of Zeus) are from the city of Philippi, though some are from other areas (such as the grave stela of Tiberius Claudius Maximus, which was found at Grammeni).

The Early Christian period in the area is represented by coins and pottery from the settlements at Drama and Philippi. The most characteristic of the few monuments of the Byzantine period are a stone sundial with engraved hours (1069 AD) from the Palaiohori area; and pottery, coins, and jewellery from Drama, Adriani and Ksiropotamos.

The museum also displays a hoard of Ottoman coins, icons and architectural members from post-Byzantine churches, and a number of photographs of Drama and the surrounding area prior to liberation in 1913. Sculptures (votive monuments, architectural members, grave monuments) from the ancient period to the time of Ottoman rule are displayed in the covered atrium.

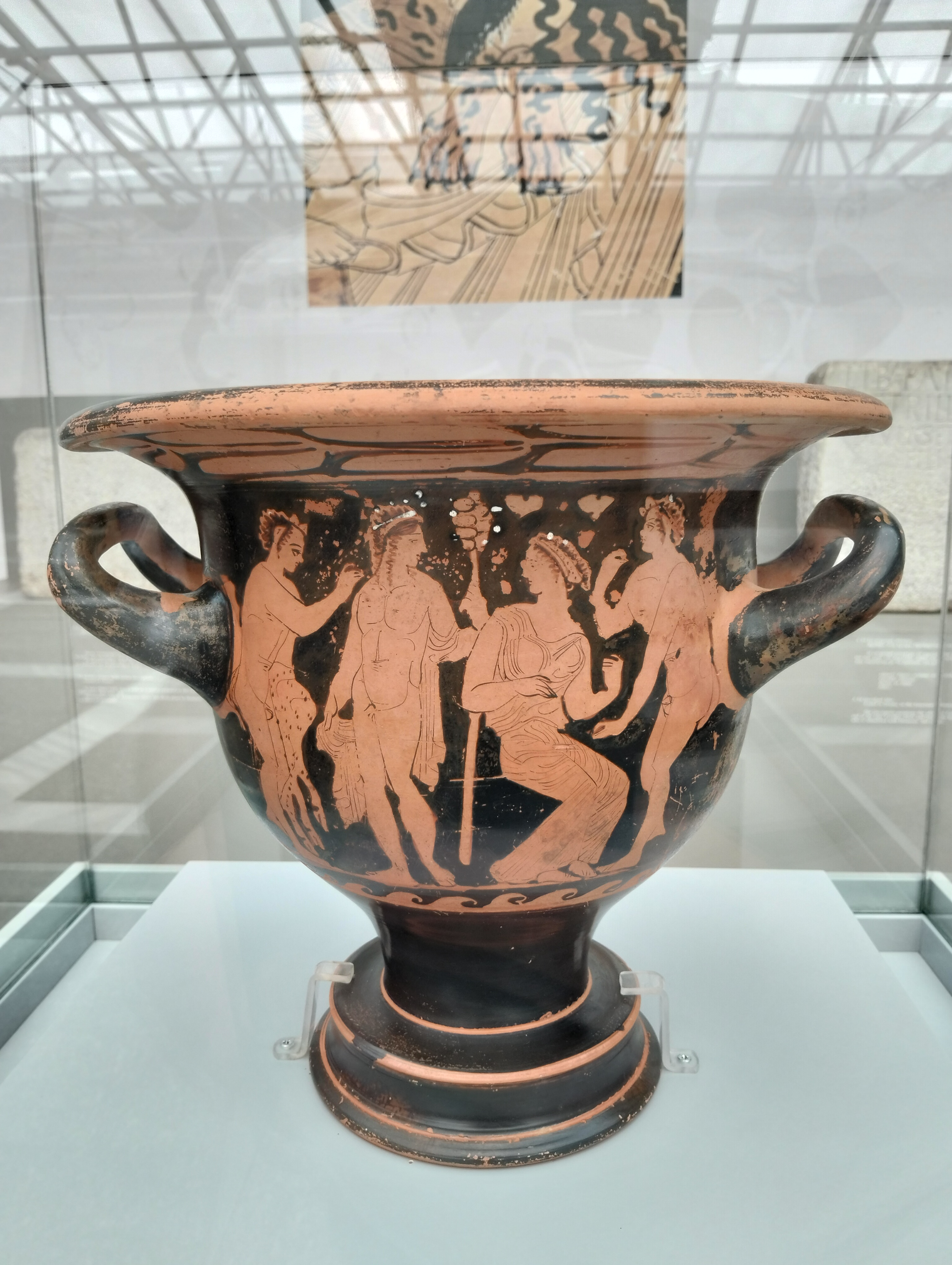
Ancient Krater (380 B.C.) found in Prosotsani.

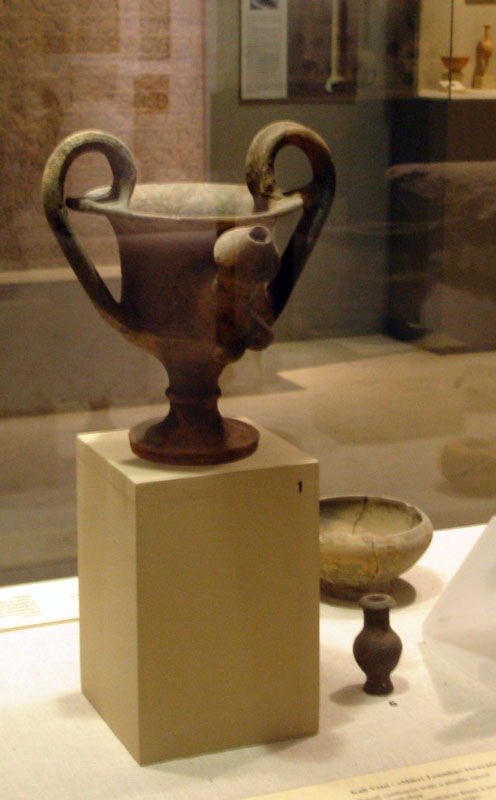
Pots from the Early Bronze Age

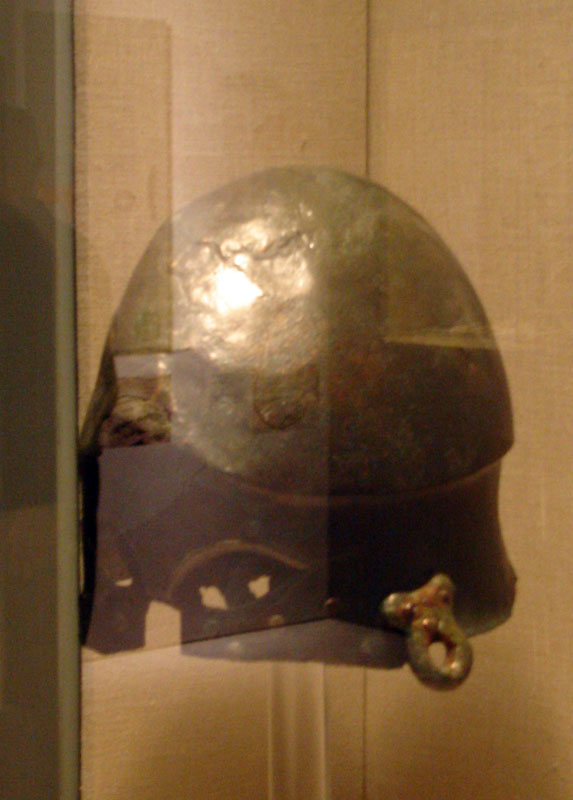
Helmet (the Early Iron Age) from graves in the industrial area of Drama

== Sources ==
- This article incorporates text from the corresponding article at the Museums of Macedonia website, commissioned by the Macedonian Heritage foundation, written by Vlasis Vlasidis, and published under a CC-BY-SA-3.0 license.
