= Drama, Greece =

City in Macedonia, Greece

Drama Δράμα
- Municipality
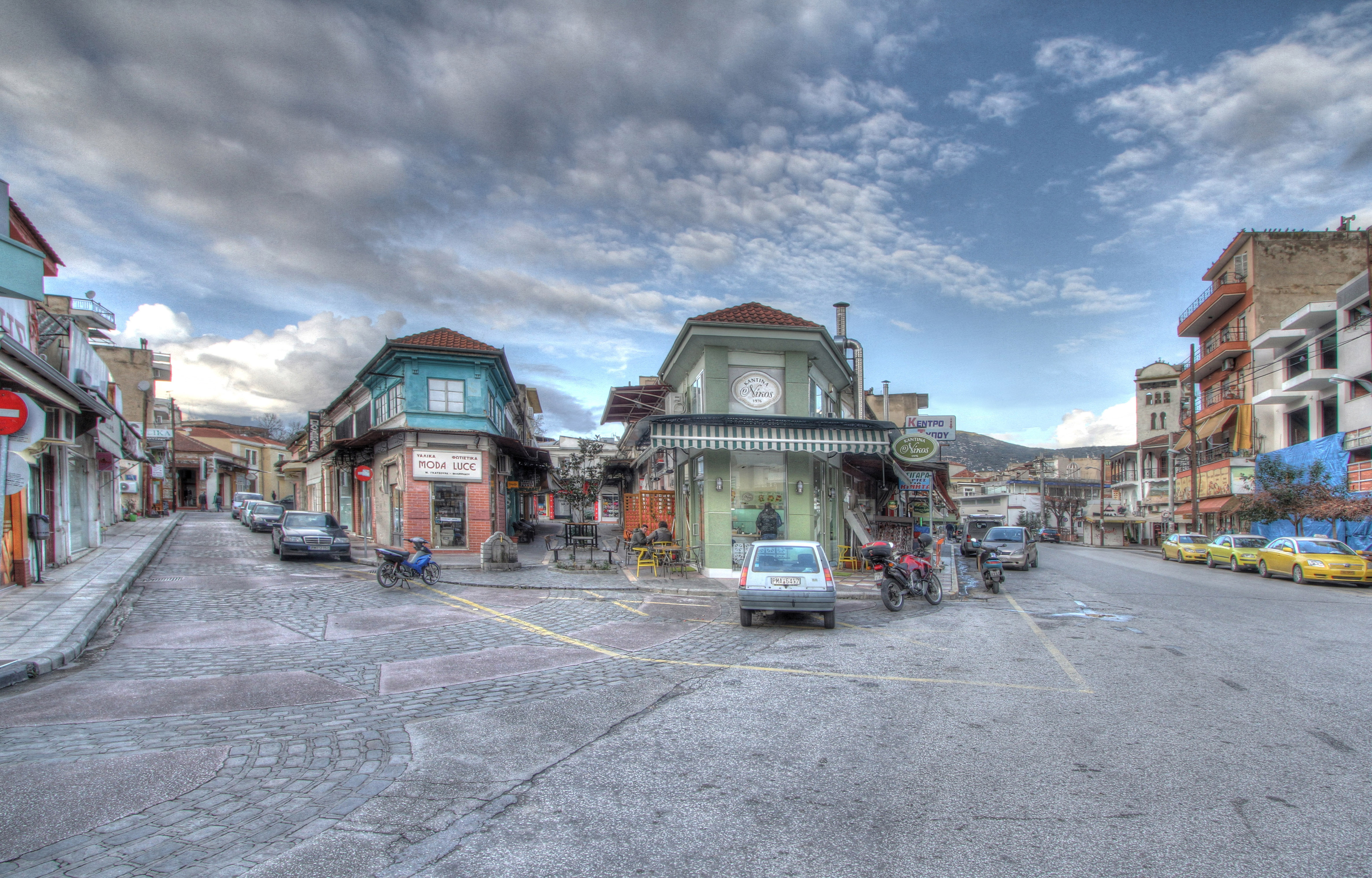

- Location within Greece
- Coordinates: 41°9′00″N 24°8′48″E
- Country: Greece
- Geographic region: Macedonia
- Administrative region: Eastern Macedonia and Thrace
- Regional unit: Drama

Government
  - Mayor: Georgios Papadopoulos (since 2023)

Area
  - Municipality: 840.1 km^{2} (324.4 sq mi)
  - Municipal unit: 488.8 km^{2} (188.7 sq mi)
- Elevation: 115 m (377 ft)

Population (2021)
  - Municipality: 55,679
  - Density: 66.28/km^{2} (171.7/sq mi)
  - Municipal unit: 55,440
  - Municipal unit density: 113.4/km^{2} (293.8/sq mi)
  - Community: 44,257
- Time zone: UTC+2 (EET)
  - Summer (DST): UTC+3 (EEST)
- Postal code: 661 00
- Area code: 2521
- Vehicle registration: ΡΜ
- Website: dimos-dramas.gr

Drama (Greek: Δράμα, romanized: Dráma [ˈðrama]) is a city and municipality in Macedonia, northeastern Greece. Drama is the capital of the regional unit of Drama which is part of the East Macedonia and Thrace region. The city (pop. 44,257 in the 2021 census) is the economic center of the municipality (pop. 55,679), which in turn comprises 60 percent of the regional unit's population. The next largest communities in the municipality are Χiropótamos (2,535), Choristi (pop. 2,512), Kallífytos (1,627), Kalós Agrós (838), and Koudoúnia (814).

Built at the foot of mount Falakro, in a verdant area with abundant water sources, Drama has been an integral part of the Hellenic world since the classical era; under the Byzantine Empire, Drama was a fortified city with a castle and rose to great prosperity under the Komnenoi as a commercial and military junction.

During the Ottoman era, tobacco production and trade, the operation of the railway (1895) and improvement of the road network towards the port of Kavala, led to an increase in the population of the city and to the enhancement of commercial activity.

Drama hosts the "Eleftheria", cultural events in commemoration of the city's liberation, at the end of June or beginning of July, and an annual film festival in September.

== Name ==
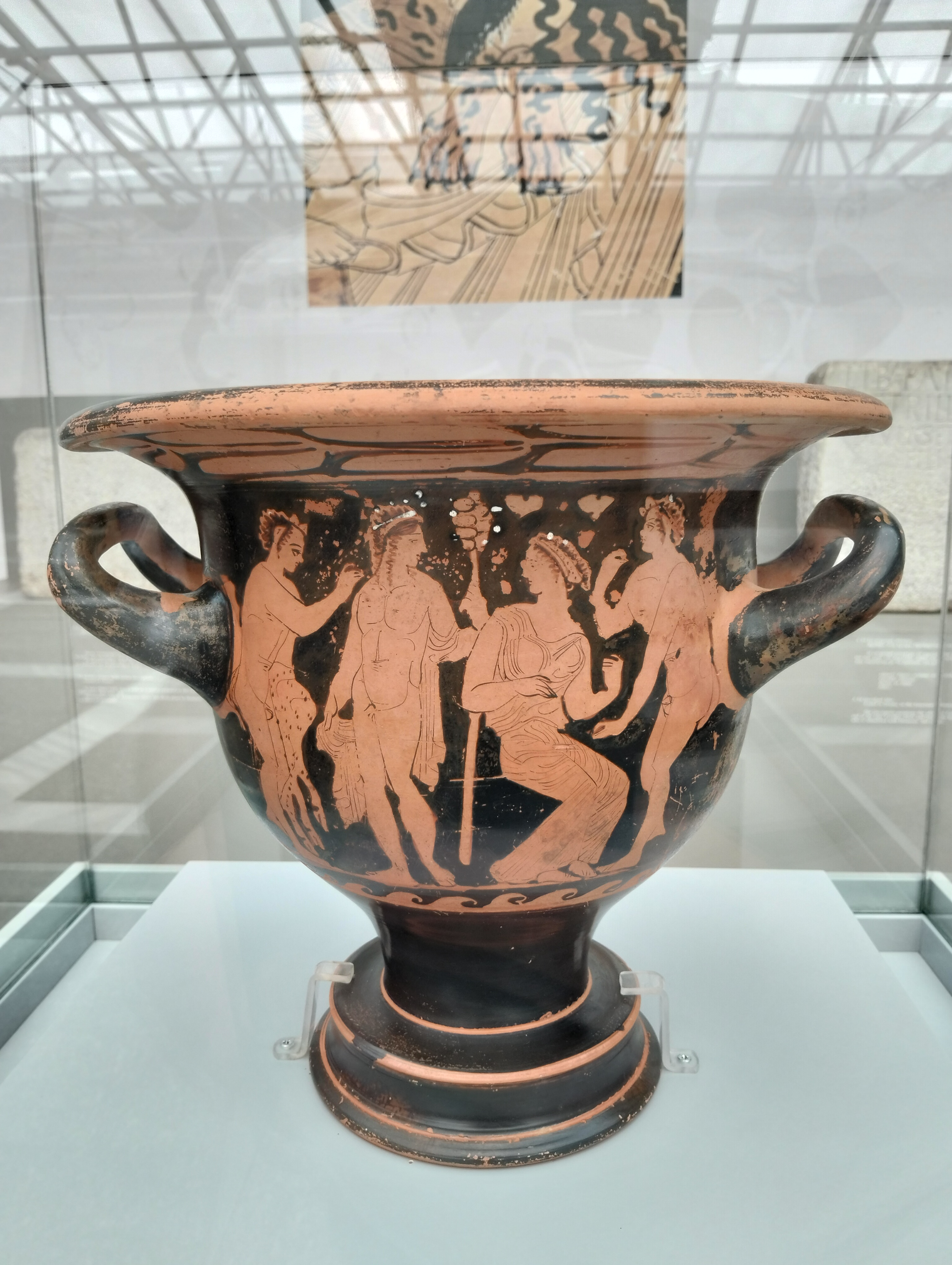
Ancient Greek krater from Prosotsani, 380 BC, Archaeological Museum of Drama

Archaeological finds show that in the area of the modern city there used to be an ancient Greek settlement named Dyrama (Greek: Δύραμα) or alternatively Hydrama (Greek: Ύδραμα), both meaning "rich in water". Some scholars associate Drama with the ancient Greek Drabescus (Greek: Δράβησκος). Hydrama was notable as the place of worship for many gods of classical Greek mythology, especially Dionysos, Apollo and Artemis. With the passage of time Dyrama became Drama. In the South Slavic languages, the city is known as Драма which is itself a transliteration of the Greek name.

== History ==
The ancient Greeks knew the city as Hydrama or Dyrama (Ύδραμα, Δύραμα) owing to its abundant water. Later known as Drabescus, it became part of the Roman and Byzantine Empires along with the rest of Greece.

=== Byzantine Era ===
During the early Christian period (4th–7th centuries), Drama was a small fortified settlement closely tied both administratively and religiously to the declining Roman colony of Philippi. Over time, Drama emerged as the region's most important urban center, a status it maintained during the Middle Byzantine period. Around the 10th century, the city was heavily fortified and flourished as a significant military and commercial hub.

Following the Fourth Crusade, Drama and its surrounding region became contested territory. It fell under the control of various powers, including the Kingdom of Thessalonica, the Bulgarians, the Serbs, and the Despotate of Epirus, before being reclaimed by the Byzantine Empire under the Palaiologos dynasty. Empress Irene of Montferrat, wife of Andronikos II, died in Drama during this period. However, the city was destabilized by the Byzantine civil wars of the 14th century, struck by the plague, and fell under Serbian control in 1345. Although briefly recaptured by the Byzantines in 1371, Drama was ultimately seized by the Ottomans in 1383, marking the definitive end of Byzantine rule in the area.

=== Ottoman Era ===
The Ottoman Empire conquered the region in 1383. In 1519 (Hijri 925) the town had 116 Muslim and 153 Christian households; it was in the jurisdiction of the beylerbey of Rumeli, Ferhad Pasha. In the 19th century, the town became centre of the Sanjak of Drama. In 1912, during the First Balkan War, Bulgarian troops took Drama from the Ottomans. In 1913, as a result of the Treaty of Bucharest following the Second Balkan War, the area became part of Greece - along with the rest of eastern Macedonia.

=== World War II ===
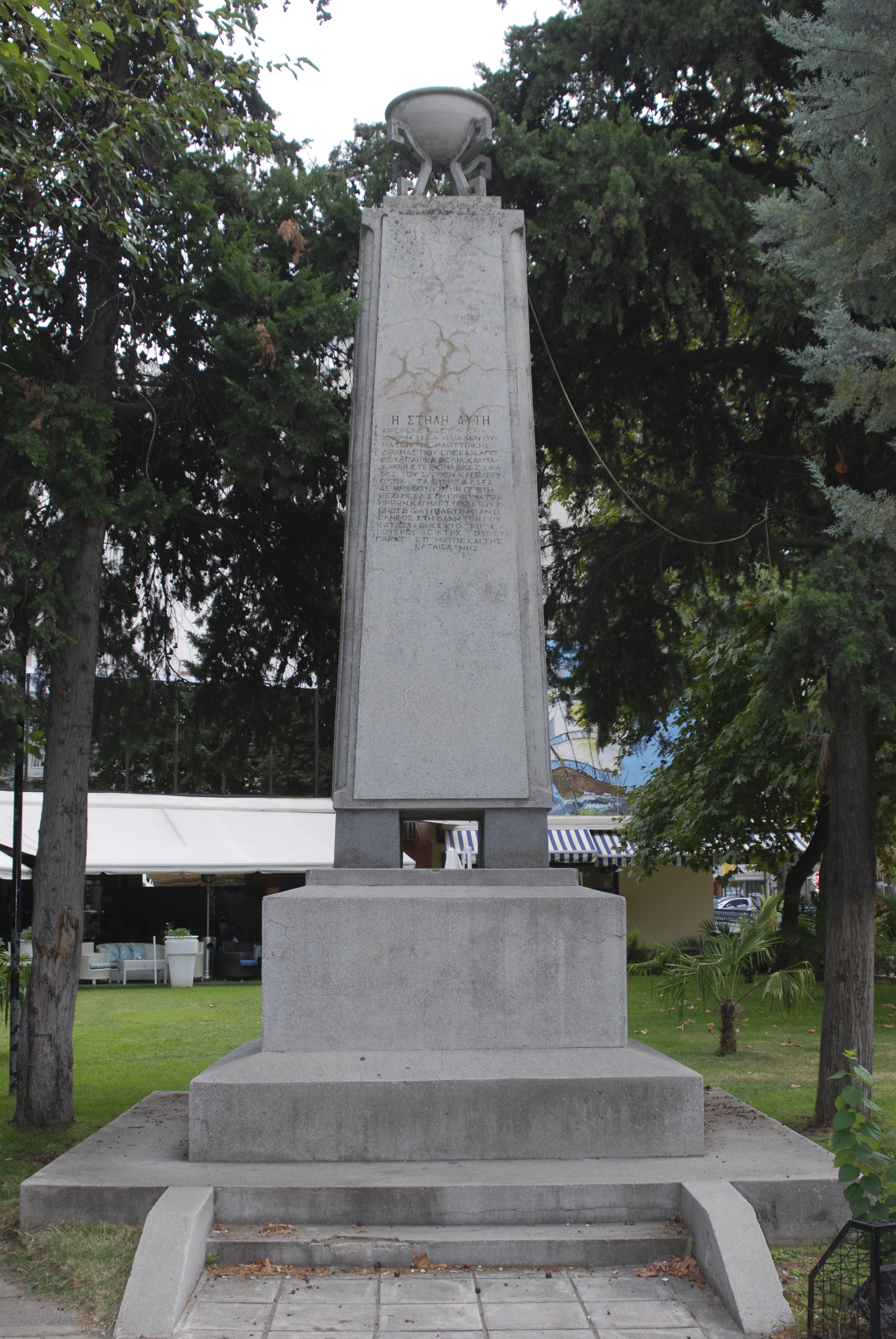
Monument for the Drama uprising

During World War II, in the wake of the 1941 German invasion of Greece, Bulgarian troops occupied Drama from 1941 to 1944.

On 28 September 1941, the local communist party organized a series of guerrilla attacks against the occupying forces in Drama and the surrounding villages. In response, the Bulgarian occupation forces applied harsh reprisals in Drama, Doxato and several villages like Choristi, Kyrgia, Koudounia, and Prosotsani. The following day, 29 September, the leaders of the attacks were all killed in battle or in their attempts to escape to the German occupation zone. Bulgarian troops moved into Drama to suppress the uprising and arrested all men between 18 and 45. They were reported to have executed between 360 and 500 people in Drama. According to the Bulgarian military reports, up to 1,600 Greeks were killed in the uprising and in the weeks that followed.

The massacres precipitated an exodus of Greeks from the Bulgarian to the German occupation zone in Central Macedonia. The terror and famine became so severe that the government in Athens considered plans for evacuating the entire Greek population to German-occupied Greece.

On 4 March 1943, after midnight, the Bulgarian military authorities rounded up the Jewish population across their zone of occupation in eastern Macedonia and Thrace. The 4,000-strong community, including 589 Jews from Drama, was carried by train into Bulgarian territory and assembled in tobacco warehouses, which were empty at that time of year. From there they were taken by train to the Treblinka extermination camp. None of the 589 Jews from Drama ever returned.

== Geography ==
=== Climate ===
Drama has a Mediterranean climate with hot, dry summers and chilly, wet winters.

Climate data for Drama, Greece
Month	Jan	Feb	Mar	Apr	May	Jun	Jul	Aug	Sep	Oct	Nov	Dec	Year
Mean daily maximum °C (°F)	8.3 (46.9)	11.7 (53.1)	14.9 (58.8)	20.2 (68.4)	25.1 (77.2)	29.5 (85.1)	32.3 (90.1)	33.1 (91.6)	28.0 (82.4)	20.8 (69.4)	15.7 (60.3)	10.1 (50.2)	20.8 (69.4)
Daily mean °C (°F)	3.7 (38.7)	6.6 (43.9)	9.5 (49.1)	13.7 (56.7)	18.6 (65.5)	22.8 (73.0)	25.5 (77.9)	25.9 (78.6)	21.2 (70.2)	14.8 (58.6)	10.3 (50.5)	5.0 (41.0)	14.8 (58.6)
Mean daily minimum °C (°F)	−0.2 (31.6)	2.0 (35.6)	4.3 (39.7)	7.5 (45.5)	12.0 (53.6)	16.4 (61.5)	18.5 (65.3)	18.9 (66.0)	14.8 (58.6)	9.7 (49.5)	5.6 (42.1)	0.4 (32.7)	9.2 (48.6)
Average rainfall mm (inches)	71 (2.8)	63 (2.5)	74 (2.9)	38 (1.5)	53 (2.1)	74 (2.9)	32 (1.3)	22 (0.9)	45 (1.8)	75 (3.0)	42 (1.7)	71 (2.8)	660 (26.2)

== Municipality ==
The municipality Drama was formed at the 2011 local government reform by the merger of the following two former municipalities, which became municipal units (constituent communities in brackets):

- Drama (Choristi, Drama, Kallifytos, Kalos Agros, Koudounia, Livadero, Makryplagio, Mavrovatos, Mikrochori, Monastiraki, Mylopotamos, Nikotsaras, Xiropotamos)
- Sidironero (Sidironero, Skaloti)

The municipality has an area of 840.103 km^{2}, the municipal unit 488.830 km^{2}.

== Population ==
Year	City	Municipal community	Municipality
1981	36,109	37,118	37,118
1991	37,604	38,546	47,925
2001	42,501	43,485	55,632
2011	44,823	45,828	58,944
2021	44,257	55,440	55,679

== Economy ==
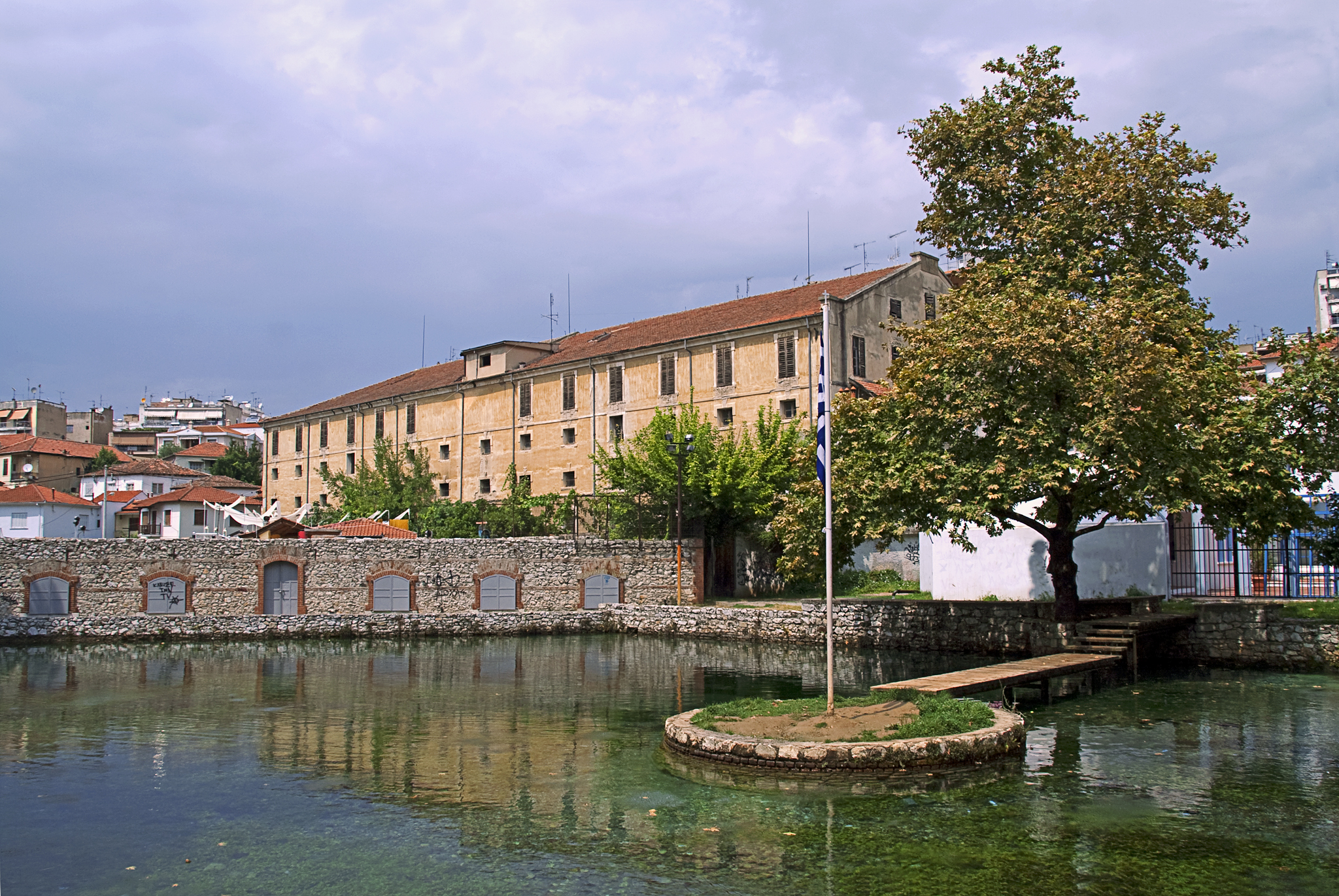
The old Herman Spierer tobacco warehouse

In the recent past, the economy of the Drama area relied heavily on the local paper and textile-clothing industries. However, these industries have either closed down or moved across the border to Bulgaria, because of the low demands of the Bulgarian workforce, with a negative impact on the local economy and employment. The situation worsened after 2007, when Bulgaria was admitted to the EU, and local Greek businessmen moved to expand their operations there. Other sources of revenue include agriculture, consisting mainly of tobacco plantations, small-scale mining (particularly of marble) and forestry. Recently, there have been efforts to exploit the rich local natural environment and to develop ecotourism.

There is a modern ski resort on Mount Falakro. Drama also hosts an annual short film festival.

== Transport ==
=== Rail transport ===
The town is served by Drama railway station on the Thessaloniki-Alexandroupoli line, with daily services to Thessaloniki and Alexandroupolis.

== Culture ==
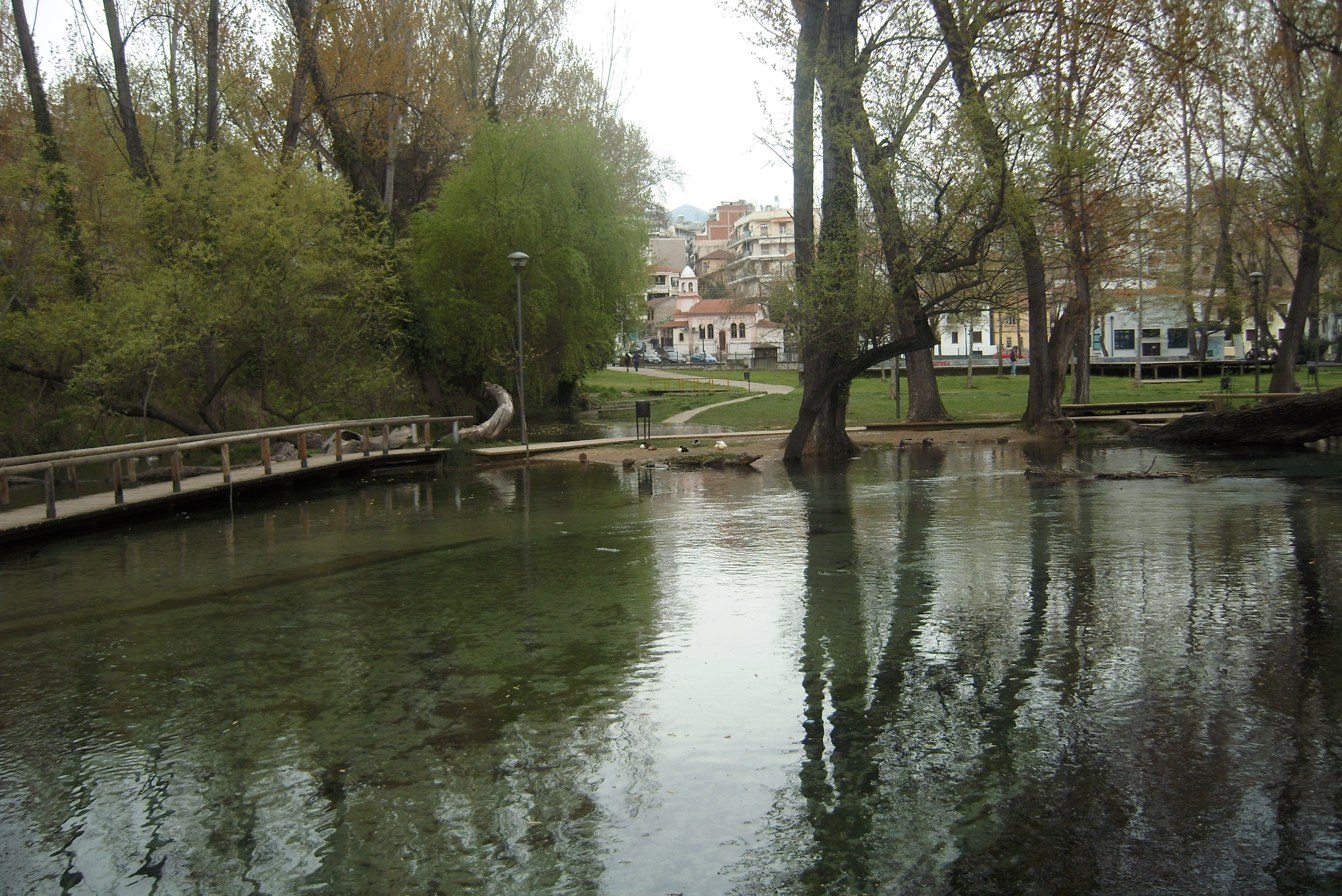
The springs of Agia Varvara

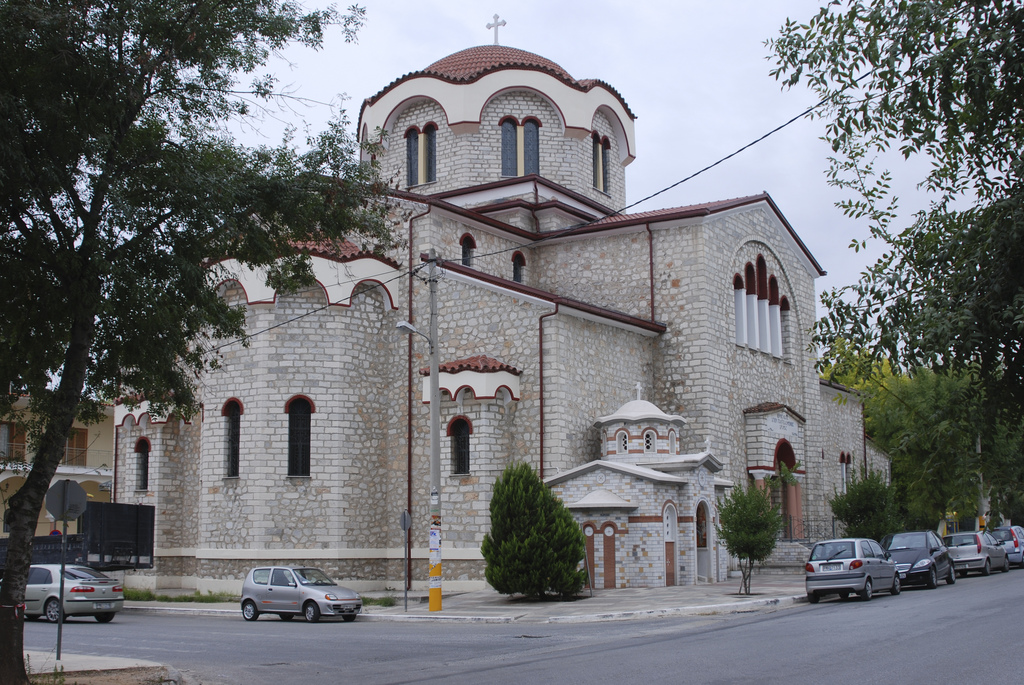
The church of St. Panteleimon

Since 1978, Drama has hosted the Drama International Short Film Festival. In 1987, the festival was recognized nationally. In 1995, it added the International competition section, where short films from all over the world visit the city every year. In 1996, the festival was included in the National Cultural Network of Cities by the Greek Ministry of Culture.

=== Churches ===
==== Hagia Sophia Church ====
Hagia Sophia is the oldest surviving preserved monument in Drama (aside from an ancient Macedonian tomb discovered in the basement of a modern apartment building). The church was built during the tenth century AD, along with Drama's city walls. It was probably erected on the site of a previous early Christian basilica. During the Ottoman rule, it was turned into a mosque.

=== Museums ===
==== Archaeological Museum ====
The Archaeological Museum of Drama covers human presence in the regional unit of Drama from the mid-Paleolithic Period (50,000 years before present) with traces of life from Paleolithic hunts in the caves of the source of the Angitis, up to modern times (1913).

The exhibition space consists of three main halls. In the first, archaeological finds from the cave of Maara give witness to the presence of nomadic hunters in the area from the mid-Palaeolithic period, while other finds demonstrate the life of settled farmers and animal rearers from Neolithic villages and the passage of the Copper Age in the city of Drama and the village of Sitagri. The reproduction of a Neolithic house with finds which describe the activities of Neolithic man and his daily activities is the main centre of interest for visitors of all ages.

Bust of Dionysius, found in the area of Kali Vrysi. The same hall continues the journey through time to the Iron Age and later years where the main element was the worship of Dionysius at the city of Drama itself and at Kali Vrysi and other areas of the regional unit. In the second hall architectural sculptures, pottery and coins confirm that life continued in the city and throughout the whole regional unit during early Christian, Byzantine and post-Byzantine years.

The visitor is taken through modern recent history by a photographic exhibition relating to the city of Drama, the towns of the regional unit and the mountain villages. The exhibition covers the period from the beginning of the Ottoman period up to the middle of the 19th century. In the third hall which is roofed with an atrium, the visitor can admire sculptures arranged into three thematic groups. The first includes architectural sculptures dating from ancient times up to Turkish occupation. The second contains votive monuments connected with the worship of various gods in the Greco-Roman pantheon as well as local deities, with particular reference to Dionysius while the third group of sculptures focuses on funerary monuments from Hellenistic and Roman times.

==== Ecclesiastical Museum ====
The history of the Christian Church in Drama began during the Byzantine period and underwent difficult and troubled times. From the 14th century when the city was captured by the Ottomans until the 20th century with successive foreign occupations, the Greek Orthodox Church in Drama struggled without end, fed by the blood of many faithful, martyrs to the faith and to the Hellenic ideal and provided succor to its followers through difficult periods.

The collection of icons dating from Byzantine times to the 20th century forms the basic core of the museum's exhibits. The Museum of the Cathedral of Drama, founded during the reign of the honourable Bishop Dionysius 1st, is now housed in a recently restored five-storey wing of the Bishop of Drama's palace on Venizelou St. In the spacious and well-attended halls, ecclesiastical treasures of priceless spiritual and artistic value are on exhibition. The Icons of the Virgin Ηοdegetria and the Blessing Lord from the 13th century, icons from the 17th century and particularly from the 19th century decorate and sanctify the place. Moreover, the episcopal canonicals, holy vessels and their covers, many from the 19th century, relics of Chrysostomos of Drama and Smyrni, constitute the most important exhibits in the museum.

Many of the exhibits are relics brought by refugees from Asia Minor and Pontus in 1922 from the churches of their ancient homes to their new home, valuable reminders of who they were and where they came from. Organized groups of pilgrims and visitors to the city are advised to contact the office of the Diocese of Drama before visiting the museum to make arrangements.

==== Other museums ====
- Folklore Museum (Drama)

=== Sport ===
Drama hosts many sport teams in various sports. The most famous and most popular is Doxa Drama, founded in 1918. Other successful clubs with presence in Greek national divisions are KAOD (basketball club), Pandramaikos F.C., Drama 1986 and Amazones Dramas.

Sport clubs based in Drama
Club	Founded	Sports	Achievements
Doxa Drama	1918	Football	Earlier long-time presence in A Ethniki
Pandramaikos FC	1969	Football	Earlier presence in Beta Ethniki
Drama 1986	1986	Handball	Presence in A1 Ethniki
KAOD	1989	Basketball	Presence in A1 Ethniki
Titanes Dramas	1990	Basketball	Presence in A2 Ethniki women
Amazones Dramas	2005	Football	Panhellenic title in Greek women football

=== Notable people ===
- Irene of Montferrat (c. 1274–1317), Byzantine Empress
- Kostas Apostolidis (1948–2024), businessman
- Michael Athans (b. 1937), electrical engineer, retired MIT professor
- Tabanıyassı Mehmed Pasha- Grand Vizier of the Ottoman Empire, (died 1637)
- Mahmud Dramali Pasha (1780–1822), Ottoman General during the Greek Independence War
- Basilis C. Xanthopoulos (1951–1990), theoretical physicist
- Koulis Stoligkas (1910–1984), actor
- Nikos Sergianopoulos (1952–2008), television and stage actor
- Petros Gaitanos (b. 1967), singer
- Tania Tsanaklidou,(b. 1952) singer
- Natassa Theodoridou, (b. 1970), singer
- Apostolos Nikolaidis (1938–1999), singer
- Yesari Asım Arsoy (1900–1992), classical Turkish music composer–singer
- Dimitris Siovas (b. 1988), footballer
- Ioannis Fetfatzidis (b. 1990), footballer
- Paraskevas Antzas (1976–2026), footballer
- Charikleia Bouda (b. 1980), Olympic sprinter
- Stratos Perperoglou (b. 1984), basketball player
- Konstantinos Douvalidis (b. 1987), Olympic hurdler
- Athanassios Tsakiris (b. 1965), five-time Winter Olympian
- Panagiota Tsakiri (b. 1990), Olympic biathlete and cross-country skier
- Anna Korakaki (b. 1996), shooter, Gold medalist Women's 25m pistol, bronze medalist in the 10m air pistol at the 2016 Summer Olympics

== Gallery ==
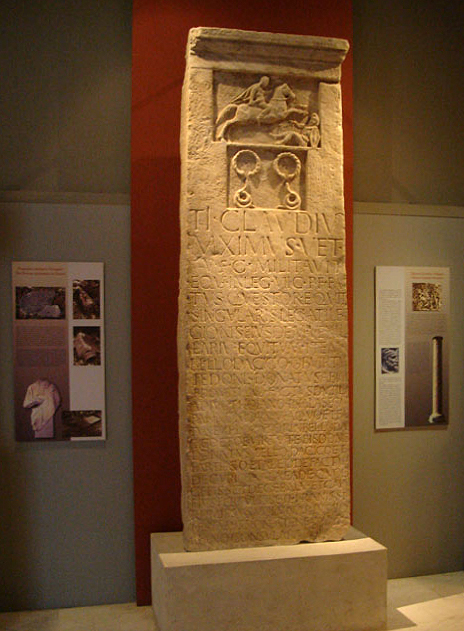
Grave stele of Tiberius Claudius Maximus, Archaeological Museum of Drama

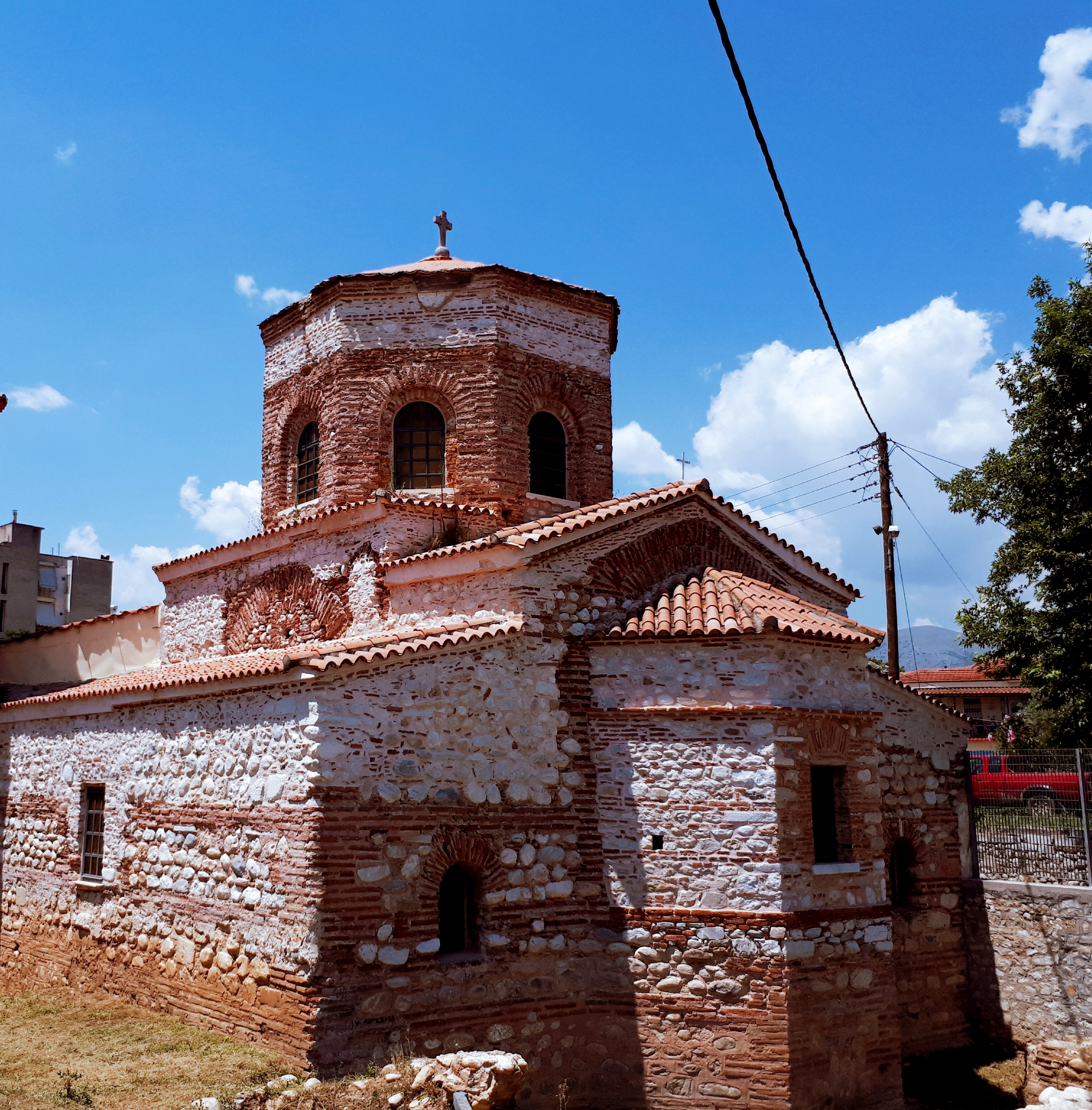
Agia Sofia Byzantine church

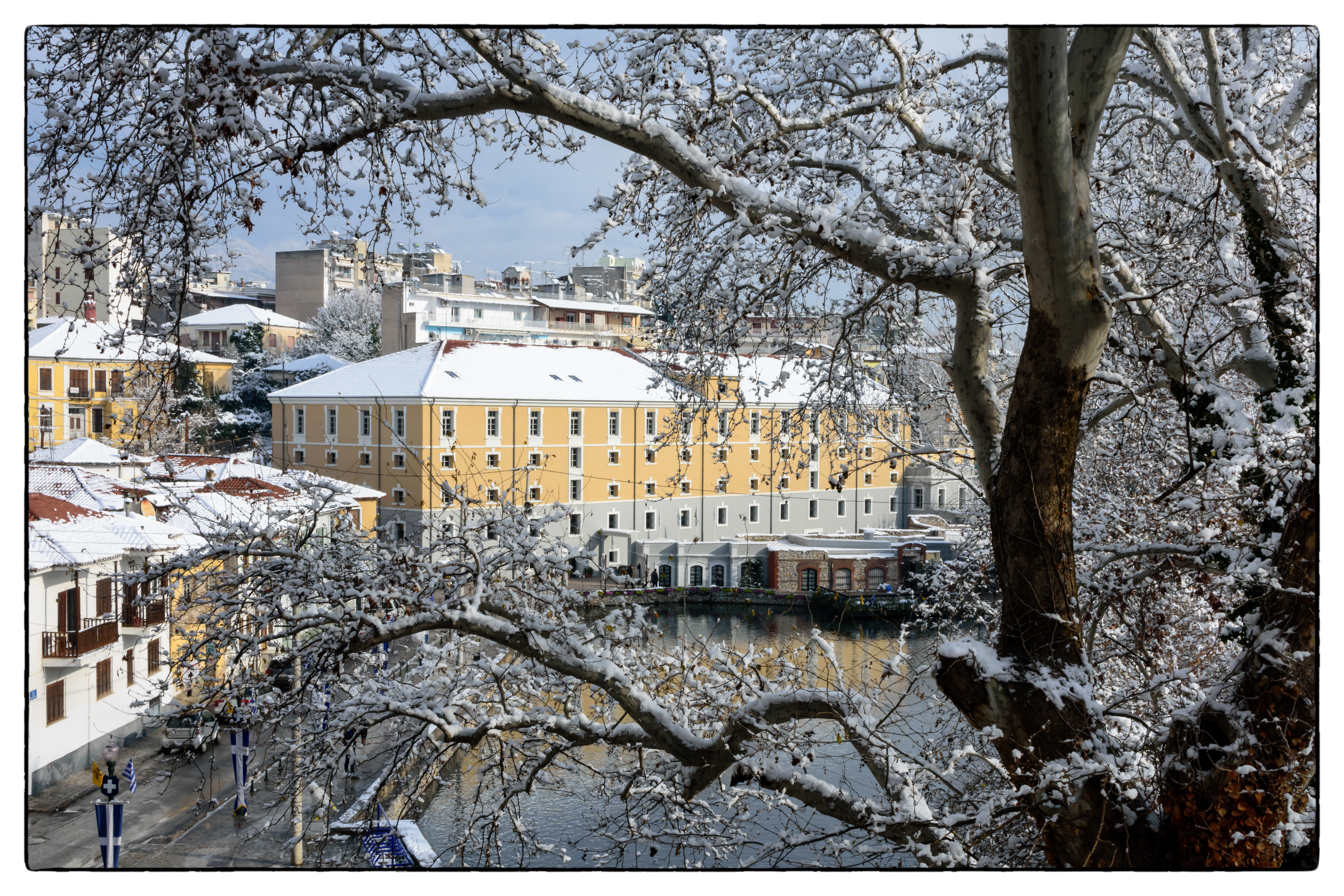
Spierer tobacco warehouse in snow

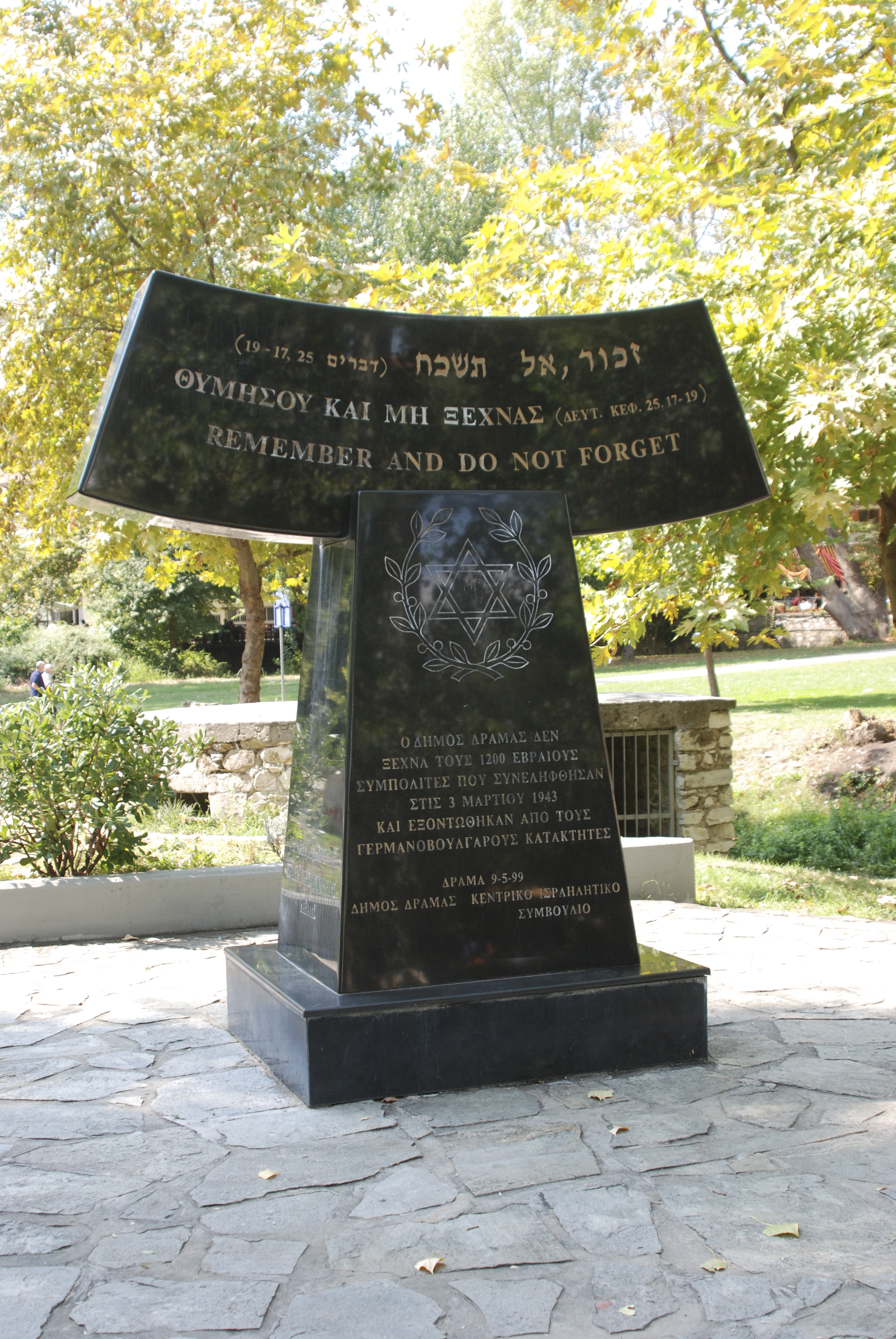
Holocaust memorial to Greek Jews deported to the Treblinka extermination camp

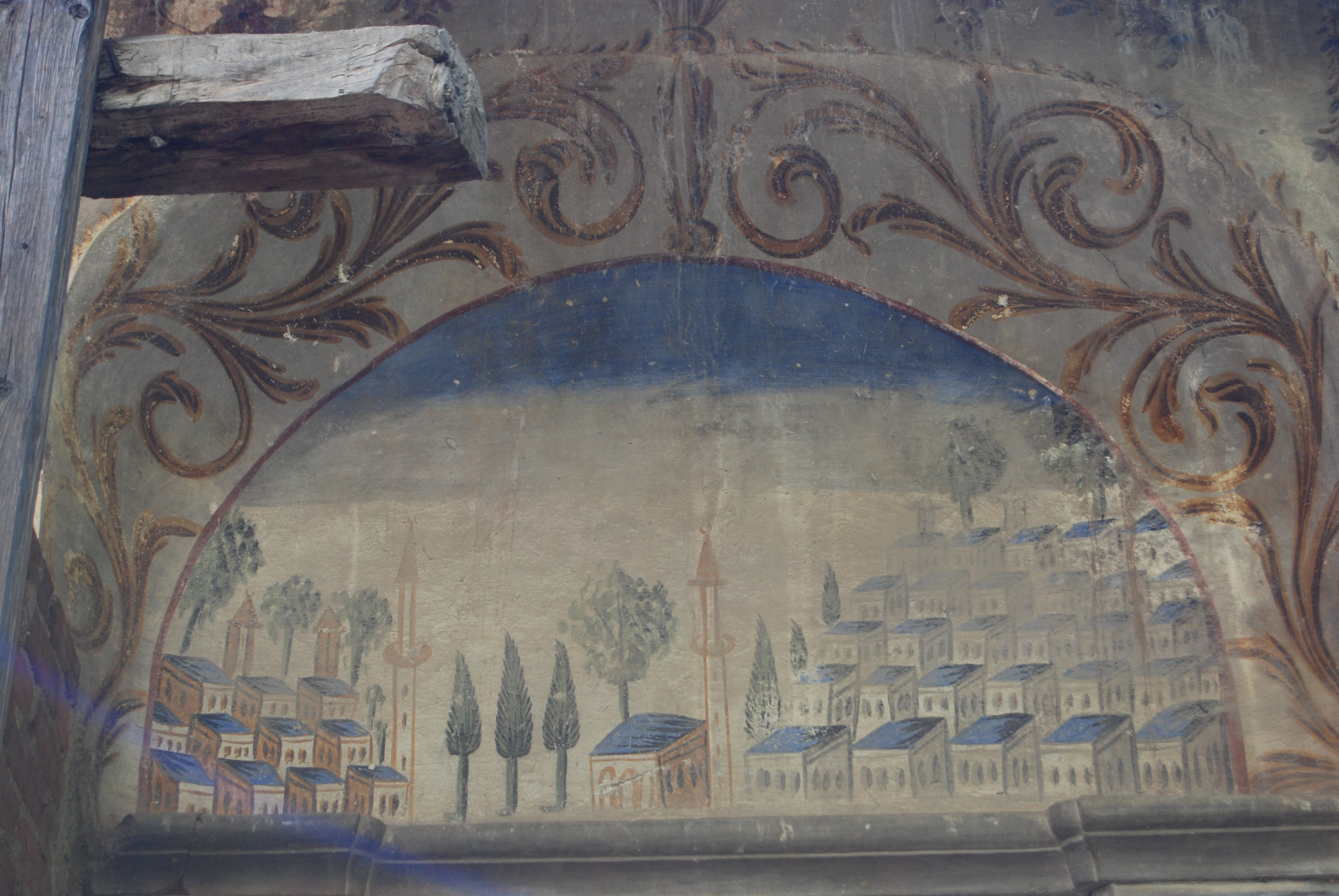
A 19th-century fresco depicting Drama from the Sadirvan Mosque

== See also ==
- List of settlements in the Drama regional unit

== Cooperation with other cities ==
- Kragujevac, Serbia
- Lauf an der Pegnitz, Germany

== Bibliography ==
- Gaydarska, B. "Prehistoric Drama and its regional context," in Stoyanov, T., Angelova, S. & Lozanov (eds), Stephanos Archaeologicos in honorem Professoris Ludmilli Getov, Vol. I (Sofia: Sofia University Press, 2005), 116 – 133.
