= Vassilis Dimitriadis =

Greek alpine skier (born 1978)

Personal information
- Nationality: Greek
- Born: 22 August 1978 (age 46); Brussels, Belgium

Sport
- Sport: Alpine skiing

Vassilis Dimitriadis (born 22 August 1978 in Belgium) is a retired alpine ski racer from Greece and the former Head coach of Greek National Ski Team. He competed for Greece at the 1998 Winter Olympics, 2002 Winter Olympics, 2006 Winter Olympics and the 2010 Winter Olympics. His best result was a 23rd place in the slalom in 2006.
