= Choristi =

Choristi Χωριστή
- Community
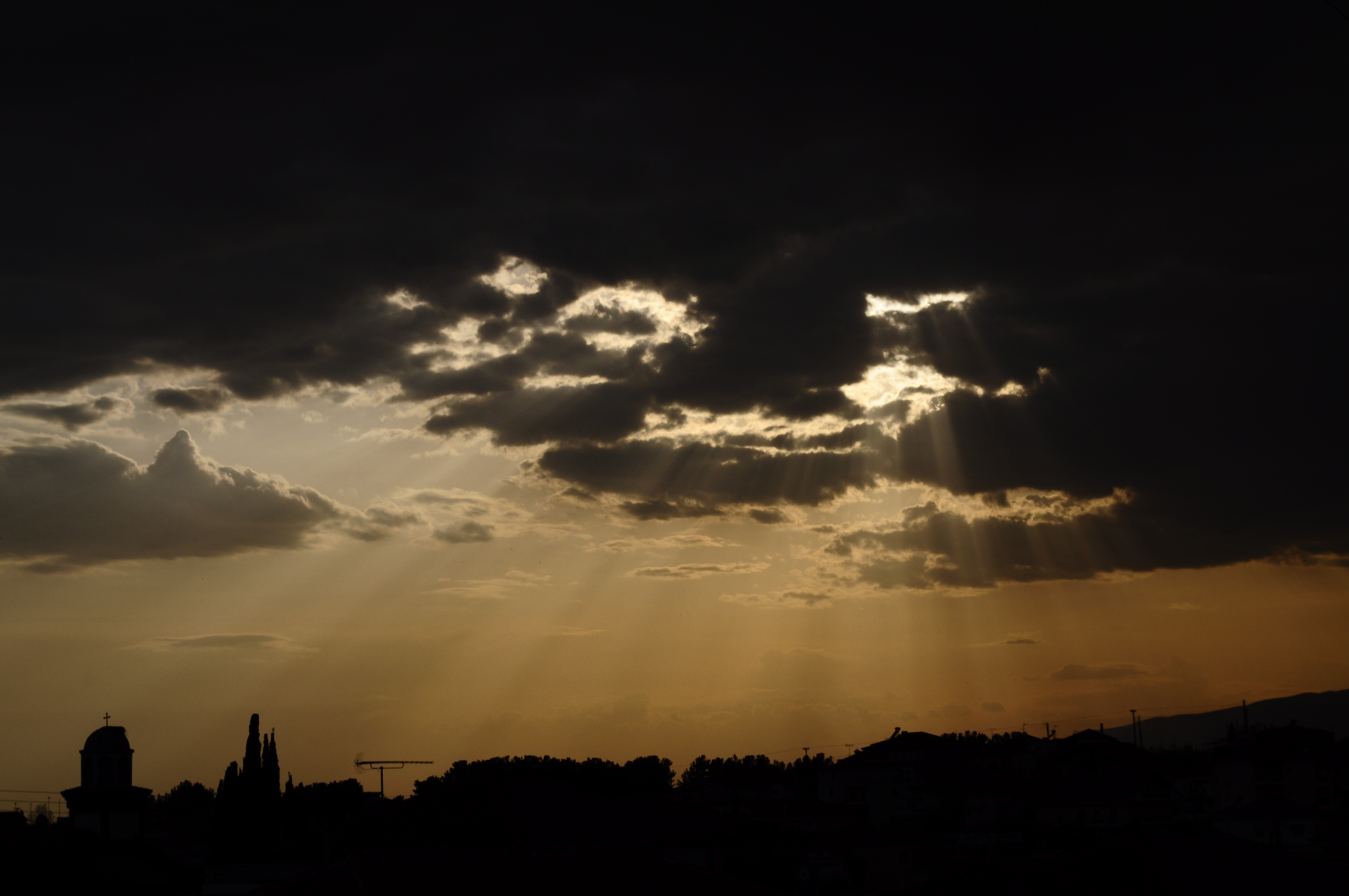
- A dark sunset in Choristi

- Location within Greece
- Coordinates: 41°7.8′N 24°12.5′E
- Country: Greece
- Administrative region: East Macedonia and Thrace
- Regional unit: Drama
- Municipality: Drama
- Municipal unit: Drama
- Highest elevation: 96 m (315 ft)

Population (2021)
  - Community: 2,512
- Time zone: UTC+2 (EET)
  - Summer (DST): UTC+3 (EEST)

Choristi (Greek: Χωριστή, before 1927: Τσατάλτζα – Tsataltza, Bulgarian: Чаталджа – Chataldzha) is a town in Drama municipality, Drama regional unit, East Macedonia and Thrace region, Greece. The town is located about 8 km southeast of Drama and has a population of 2,512 (2021 census). The elevation is approximately 98 m.

== History ==
According to the statistics of Vasil Kanchov ("Macedonia, Ethnography and Statistics"), 1,750 Greek Christians and 300 Turks lived in the village in 1900. The town was known as Τσατάλτζα – Tsataltza, until it was renamed in 1927. During World War I from 1916 to 1918 the town was occupied by Bulgarian troops and the local men were shipped out to concentration camps in Bulgaria. Of the 525 hostages from Choristi, less than 50 managed to return to Greece due to abuse, hunger and disease. During World War II, the occupying Axis powers executed a number of people in Choristi as "terrorists" or "resistance fighters" or their sympathizers. This came to be known as the "Choristi Massacre".
