= Peter Kolotouros =

Greek bobsledder

Personal information
- Nationality: Greek
- Born: 19 February 1968 (age 57)

Sport
- Sport: Bobsleigh

Peter Kolotouros (born 19 February 1968) is a Greek bobsledder. He competed in the four man event at the 1998 Winter Olympics.
