= Athanassios Tsakiris =

Greek biathlete and cross-country skier (born 1965)

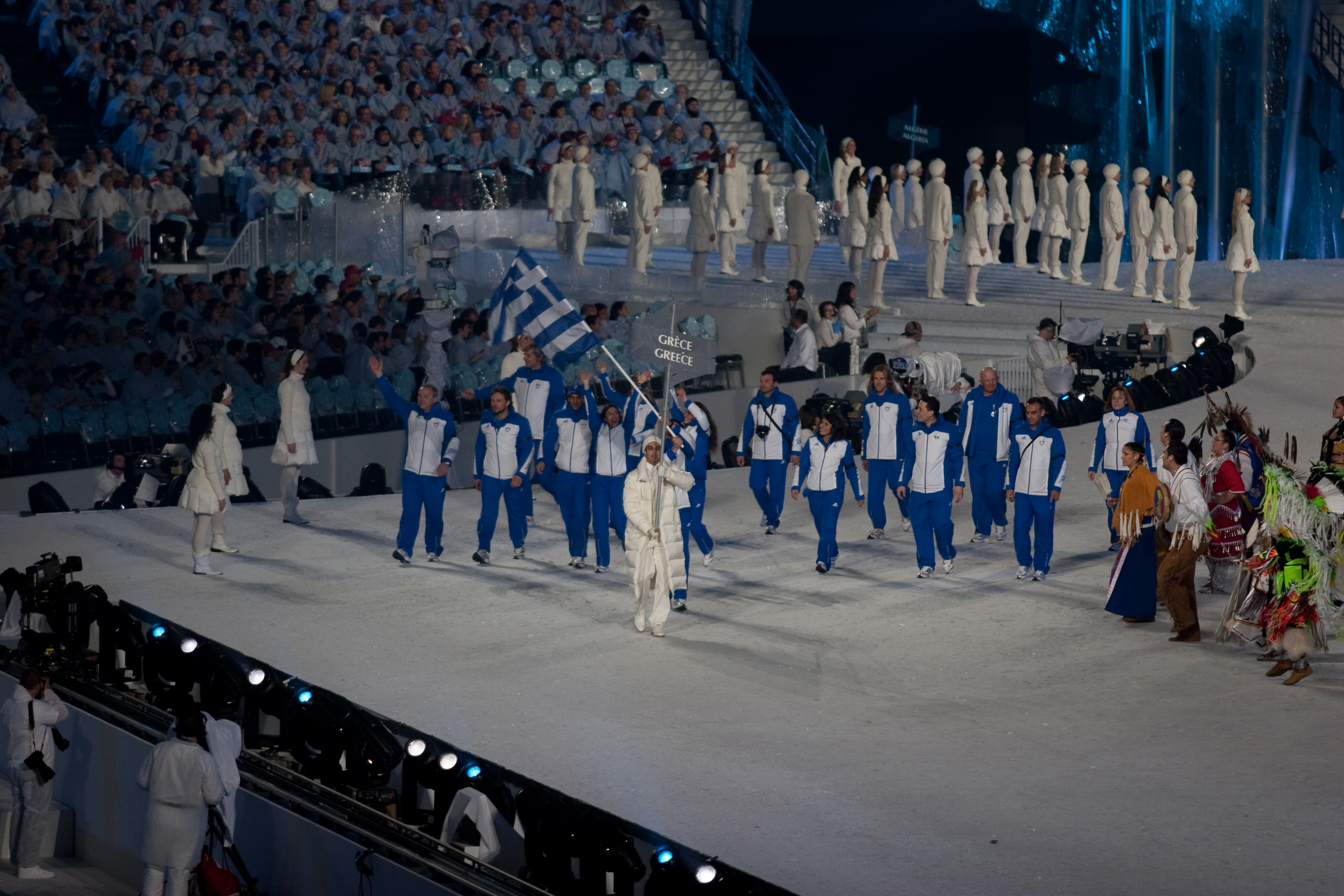

Athanassios "Thanasis" Tsakiris (Greek: Αθανάσιος "Θανάσης" Τσακίρης) (born 15 January 1965 in Drama, Greece) is a Greek biathlete and cross-country skier. He competed for Greece at five Olympics in 1988, 1992, 1994, 1998, and 2010 in cross country skiing and biathlon. He was selected to be his nation's flag bearer at the opening ceremony.

His daughter Panagiota Tsakiri competed for Greece in cross-country at the 2006 Olympics (as a fifteen-year-old) and in biathlon at the 2010 Olympics.
