= Hellenic Karate Federation =

Karate governing body in Greece

- Abbreviation: ELOK
- Formation: 1989
- Type: Sports federation
- Headquarters: Ano Liosia, Athens
- President: Christos Mpouloumpasis
- Affiliations: World Karate Federation (WKF); European Karate Federation (EKF)
- Website: www.elok.gr

Hellenic Karate Federation (Greek: Ελληνική Ομοσπονδία Καράτε, ELOK) is the governing body for Karate in Greece. It aims to govern, encourage and develop the sport for all throughout the country.

The federation organizes the national Karate events, and European and World championships hosted by Greece.
