= Hellenic Federation of Mountaineering and Climbing =

Sports governing body in Greece

Hellenic Federation of Mountaineering and Climbing (Greek: Ελληνική Ομοσπονδία Ορειβασίας Αναρρίχησης, EOOA), located in Athens, is the Greek federation of mountaineering and climbing, competition climbing and ski mountaineering.

Since 2002 Georges Moissidis, and since 2003 Nassos Tzartzanos have been honorary members of the Federation.
