= Efstathios Vogdanos =

Greek cross-country skier (born 1948)

Personal information
- Nationality: Greek
- Born: 12 October 1948 (age 76)

Sport
- Sport: Cross-country skiing

Efstathios Vogdanos (born 12 October 1948) is a Greek cross-country skier. He competed in the men's 15 kilometre event at the 1976 Winter Olympics.
