= Stergios Pappos =

Greek snowboarder

Personal information
- Nationality: Greek
- Born: 10 October 1972 (age 52)

Sport
- Sport: Snowboarding

Stergios Pappos (born 10 November 1972) is a Greek snowboarder. He competed in the men's giant slalom event at the 1998 Winter Olympics.
