= Katerina Anastasiou =

Greek cross-country skier (born 1973)

Personal information
- Nationality: Greek
- Born: 22 January 1973 (age 52)

Sport
- Sport: Cross-country skiing

Katerina Anastasiou (born 22 January 1973) is a Greek cross-country skier. She competed in the women's 5 kilometre classical at the 1998 Winter Olympics.
