= Cindy Ninos =

Greek skeleton racer

Cindy Ninos (Greek: Σίντυ Νίνος; born 27 March 1972) is a Greek skeleton racer who competed in the early 2000s. At the 2002 Winter Olympics in Salt Lake City, she finished 13th in the women's skeleton event.

Ninos's best finish at the FIBT World Championships was 24th in the women's skeleton event at Calgary in 2001.
