= Athanasios Koutsogiannis =

Greek cross-country skier (born 1956)

Personal information
- Nationality: Greek
- Born: 3 April 1956 (age 68)

Sport
- Sport: Cross-country skiing

Athanasios Koutsogiannis (born 3 April 1956) is a Greek cross-country skier. He competed in the men's 15 kilometre event at the 1976 Winter Olympics.
