= Alexandros Vouxinos =

Greek alpine skier (born 1919)

Personal information
- Nationality: Greek
- Born: 23 November 1919

Sport
- Sport: Alpine skiing

Alexandros Vouxinos (born 23 November 1919, date of death unknown) was a Greek alpine skier. He competed at the 1952 Winter Olympics and the 1956 Winter Olympics. Vouxinos is deceased.
