= Katerina Balkaba =

Greek cross-country skier (born 1982)

Personal information
- Nationality: Greek
- Born: 11 June 1982 (age 42); Naousa, Greece

Sport
- Sport: Cross-country skiing

Katerina Balkaba (born 11 June 1982) is a Greek cross-country skier. She competed in two events at the 2002 Winter Olympics.
