= Spyros Pinas =

Greek luger

Personal information
- Nationality: Greek
- Born: 14 July 1973
- Died: 17 March 2009 (aged 35); Minneapolis, Minnesota, United States

Sport
- Sport: Luge

Spyros Pinas (14 July 1973 – 17 March 2009) was a Greek luger. He competed at the 1994 Winter Olympics and the 1998 Winter Olympics.
