= Sofia Mystrioti =

Greek alpine skier (born 1975)

Personal information
- Nationality: Greek
- Born: 17 February 1975 (age 50)

Sport
- Sport: Alpine skiing

Sofia Mystrioti (born 17 February 1975) is a Greek alpine skier. She competed in the women's giant slalom at the 1998 Winter Olympics.
