= Greg Sebald =

Greek bobsledder

Personal information
- Full name: Gregory Anton Sebald
- Nationality: Greek
- Born: 1 April 1963 (age 62); Sandstone, Minnesota, USA

Sport
- Sport: Bobsleigh

Gregory Anton Sebald, known as Greg Sebald (born 11 April 1963) is a Greek bobsledder. He competed at the 1994 Winter Olympics and the 1998 Winter Olympics.
