= Anastasios Papakonstantinou =

Greek bobsledder (born 1963)

Personal information
- Nationality: Greek
- Born: 27 December 1963 (age 61)

Sport
- Sport: Bobsleigh

Anastasios Papakonstantinou (born 27 December 1963) is a Greek bobsledder. He competed in the four man event at the 1998 Winter Olympics.
