= Thomas Karadimos =

Greek alpine skier (born 1953)

Personal information
- Nationality: Greek
- Born: 16 October 1953 (age 73)

Sport
- Sport: Alpine skiing

Thomas Karadimos (born 16 October 1953) is a Greek alpine skier. He competed in three events at the 1976 Winter Olympics.
