= Despoina Vavatsi =

Greek biathlete (born 1978)

Personal information
- Nationality: Greek
- Born: 2 May 1978 (age 46)

Sport
- Sport: Biathlon

Despoina Vavatsi (born 2 May 1978) is a Greek biathlete. She competed in two events at the 2002 Winter Olympics.
