= Angelos Lembesi =

Greek alpine skier (1917–1988)

Angelos Lebessis
Personal information
- Full name: Αγγελος Λεμπεσης
- Nationality: Greek
- Born: 17 October 1917
- Died: 1988 (aged 70–71)

Sport
- Sport: Alpine skiing

Angelos Lembesi (17 October 1917 – 1988) was a Greek alpine skier. He competed in two events at the 1952 Winter Olympics.
