= Markos Khatzikyriakakis =

Greek snowboarder

Personal information
- Nationality: Greek
- Born: 2 April 1974 (age 50); Attiki, Greece

Sport
- Sport: Snowboarding

Markos Khatzikyriakakis (born 2 April 1974) is a Greek snowboarder. He competed in the men's giant slalom event at the 1998 Winter Olympics.
