= Marousa Pappou =

Greek snowboarder

Personal information
- Nationality: Greek
- Born: 29 April 1978 (age 47)

Sport
- Sport: Snowboarding

Marousa Pappou (born 29 April 1978) is a Greek snowboarder. She competed in the women's giant slalom event at the 1998 Winter Olympics.

== See also ==
- Women in Greece
