= John-Andrew Kambanis =

Greek bobsledder

Personal information
- Nationality: Greek
- Born: 10 December 1972 (age 52); Athens, Greece

Sport
- Sport: Bobsleigh

John-Andrew Kambanis (born 10 December 1972) is a Greek bobsledder. He competed at the 1998 Winter Olympics and the 2002 Winter Olympics.
