= Panagiota Tsakiri =

Greek biathlete and cross-country skier (born 1990)

Personal information
- Born: 12 May 1990 (age 36) Drama, Greece
- Height: 5 ft 8 in (173 cm)
- Weight: 60 kg (132 lb)

Sport
- Sport: Skiing
- Updated on 28 February 2013

Panagiota Tsakiri (born 12 May 1990 in Drama, Greece) is a Greek biathlete and cross-country skier.

Tsakiri competed in the 2006 and 2010 Winter Olympics for Greece. Her best performance was 66th in the 2006 cross-country sprint. She also finished 86th in the biathlon sprint and 85th in the biathlon individual.

As of February 2013, her best performance at the Biathlon World Championships is 102nd, in the 2009 sprint.

As of February 2013, Tsakiri's best performance in the Biathlon World Cup 90th, in the sprint at Pokljuka in 2009/10.

Olympic Games
Preceded by Thanassis Tsakiris	Flagbearer for Greece; Sochi 2014	Succeeded by Sophia Ralli
