= Maria Ntanou =

Greek cross-country skier (born 1990)

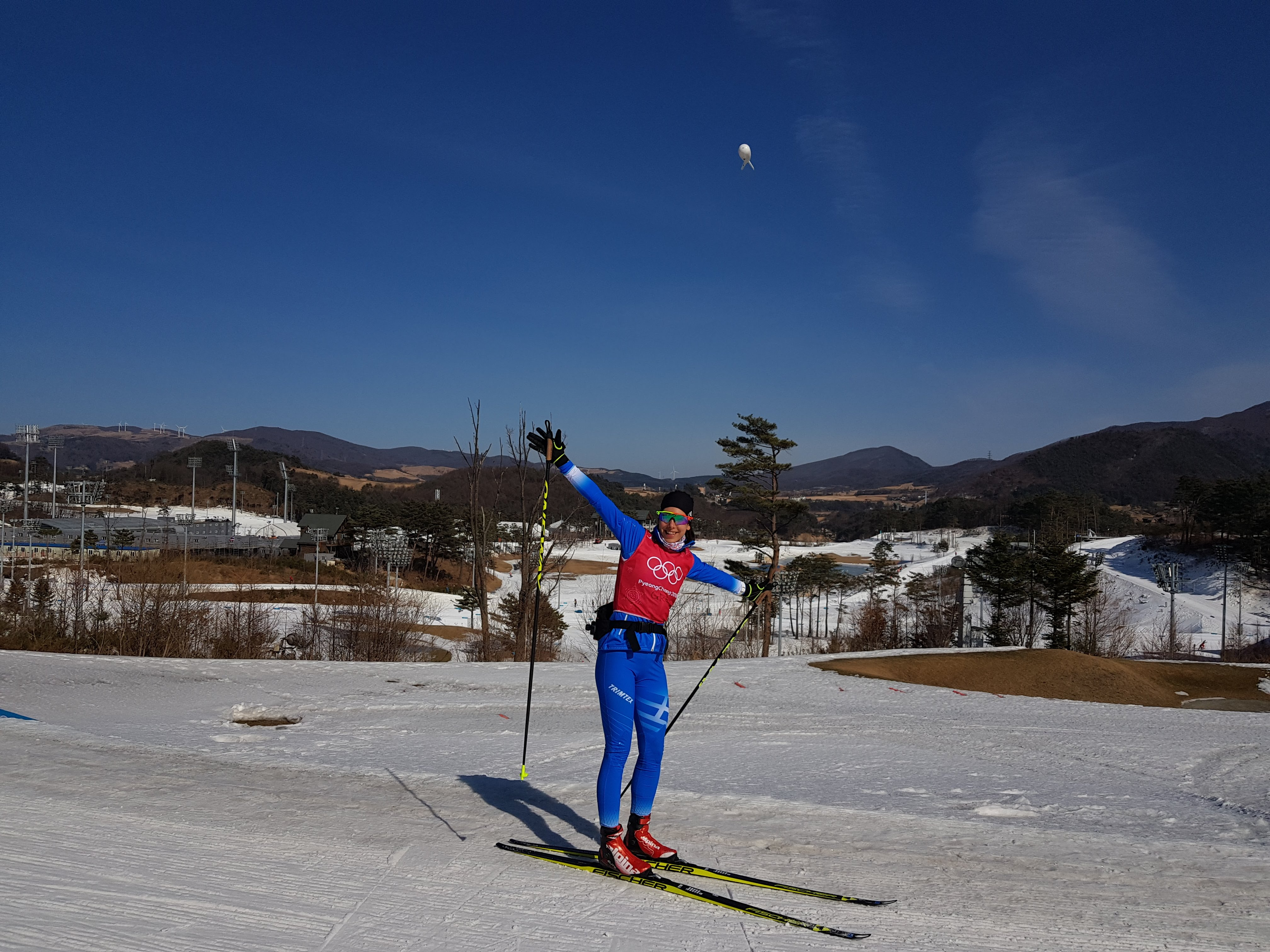
- Ntanou at the 2018 Winter Olympics

Personal information
- Nationality: Greece
- Born: 3 March 1990 (age 36) Veria, Greece

Sport
- Sport: Skiing
- Club: EOS Naousas

World Cup career
- Seasons: 2018-2022

Maria Ntanou (Greek: Μαρία Ντάνου; born 3 March 1990) is a Greek cross-country skier, Olympian who has competed since 2007. She was an Athlete Role Model of 2020 Winter Youth Olympics. Ntanou has represented her country, Greece, in three Winter Olympic Games, and she was the flag bearer at the Opening Ceremony of the Beijing 2022 Winter Olympic Games.

== Career ==
Ntanou finished 72nd in the 10 km event at the 2010 Winter Olympics in Vancouver. She took 76th place with +6:03.6 from the Norwegian Olympic Champion Ragnhild Haga at the 2018 Winter Olympics in Pyeongchang, which is the best result for Greece in this discipline. In 2022 Beijing Winter Olympics, Ntanou competed in four disciplines: sprint, 10km classic, team sprint and 30km.

At the FIS Nordic World Ski Championships 2009 in Liberec, she finished 82nd in the individual sprint while being lapped in the 15 km pursuit event. At the FIS Nordic World Ski Championships 2017 in Lahti, she finished 8th in the 5 km qualification classic race. She also won the overall Greek national cup series in 2019.

At the FIS Nordic World Ski Championships 2021 in Oberstdorf, Ntanou raced in four disciplines: sprint, skiathlon, 10 km free technique and team sprint.

== Olympic Winter Games results ==
Date	Place	Discipline	Position	Ref.
15 February 2010	Vancouver	10 km Free	72nd	
15 February 2018	Pyeongchang	10 km Free	76th	
8 February 2022	Beijing	Sprint Free	89th	
10 February 2022	Beijing	10 km Classic	88th	
16 February 2022	Beijing	Team Sprint	23rd	
20 February 2022	Beijing	30 km Free	61st	

== FIS Nordic World Ski Championships results ==
Date	Place	Discipline	Position	Ref.
21 February 2009	Liberec	15 km Pursuit	LPD	
24 February 2009	Liberec	Sprint Free	82nd	
28 February 2017	Lahti	10 km Classic	KQLF	
21 February 2019	Seefeld	Sprint Free	78th	
23 February 2019	Seefeld	Skiathlon 7.5 km/7.5 km C/F	58th	
26 February 2019	Seefeld	10 km Free	79th	
2 March 2021	Oberstdorf	10 km Free	80th	

== FIS Balkan Cup results ==
Ntanou won a bronze medal in the overall ranking of the FIS Balkan Cup series in 2017 and 2018.

Season	Points	Rank	Ref.
2017	469	3rd	
2018	500	3rd	

== Greek National Championships results ==
Date	Place	Discipline	Position	Ref.
10 January 2009	Seli	Sprint Classic	1st	
11 January 2009	Seli	10 km Classic	1st	
11 March 2017	Pigadia	Sprint Free	1st	
3 March 2018	Metsovo	Sprint Free	1st	

== Personal life ==
Ntanou grew up in Naousa, a town in the northern part of Greece with great tradition in winter sports. She studied Economic Science at the Aristotle University of Thessaloniki and graduated in 2012. At the age of 23, Ntanou moved to Lausanne to study Sport Administration and Technology (AISTS) at École Polytechnique Fédérale de Lausanne.
