= Apostolos Angelis =

Greek cross-country skier and biathlete (born 1993)

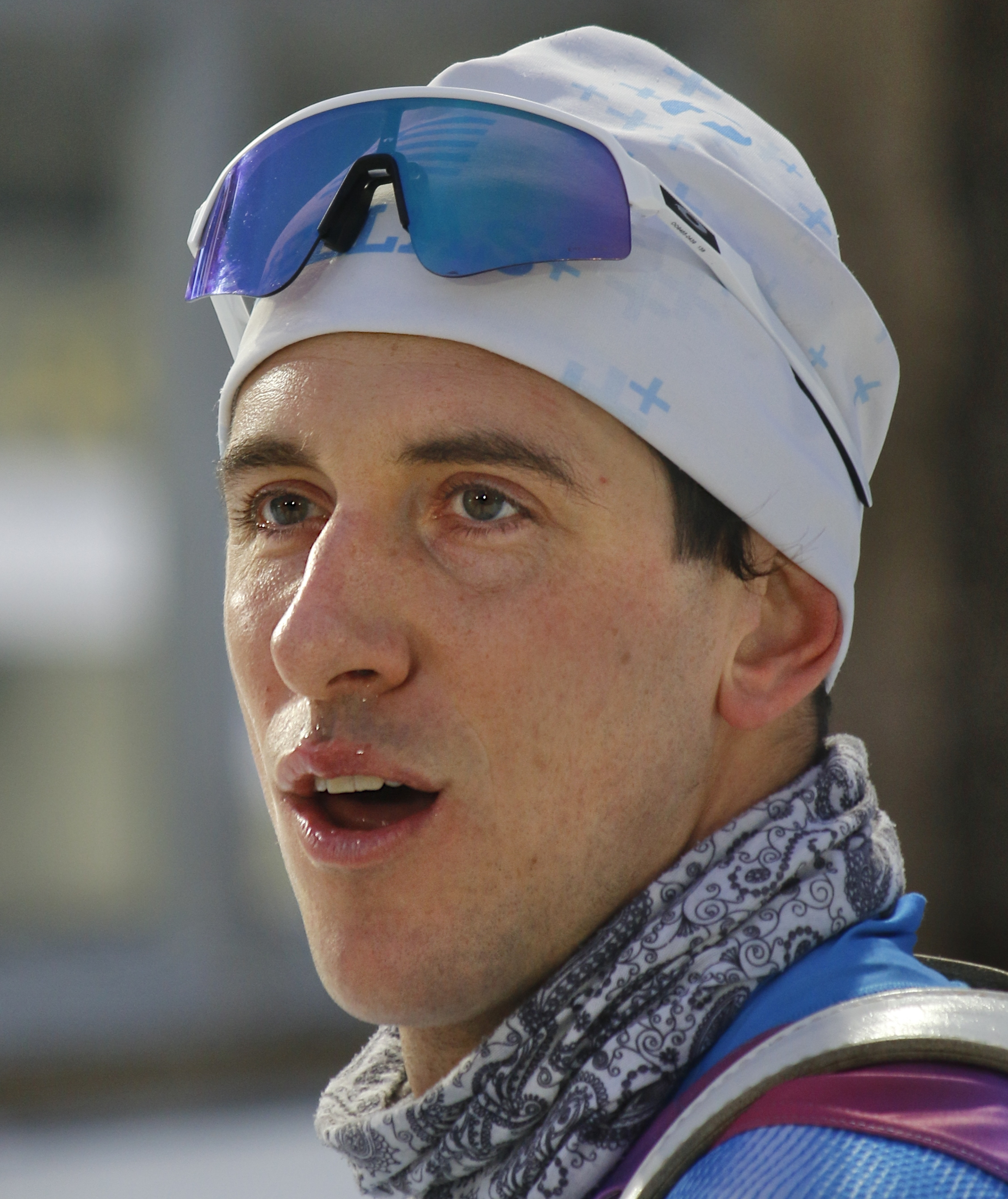
- Angelis in 2024

Personal information
- Born: 24 June 1993 (age 33) Ioannina, Greece

Apostolos Angelis (Greek: Απόστολος Αγγελής) (born 24 June 1993) is a cross-country skier and biathlete from Greece. He competed for Greece at the 2014 Winter Olympics in the sprint and finished 74th out of 86 competitors, failing to advance.

== Biathlon results ==
All results are sourced from the International Biathlon Union.

=== World Championships ===
0 medals

Event	Individual	Sprint	Pursuit	Mass start	Relay	Mixed relay	Single Mixed relay
(Austria) 2017 Hochfilzen	92nd	101st	—	—	—	—	—
(Sweden) 2019 Östersund	85th	90th	—	—	—	—	—
(Italy) 2020 Rasen-Antholz	88th	100th	—	—	—	—	—
(Slovenia) 2021 Pokljuka	86th	97th	—	—	—	—	—
(Germany) 2023 Oberhof	DNF	99th	—	—	—	—	—
(Czech Republic) 2024 Nové Město na Moravě	85th	97th	—	—	—	—	28th
(Switzerland) 2025 Lenzerheide	79th	88th	—	—	—	—	—

*During Olympic seasons competitions are only held for those events not included in the Olympic program.
**The single mixed relay was added as an event in 2019.
