= Lefteris Fafalis =

Greek cross-country skier (born 1976)

Lefteris Fafalis (Greek: Λευτέρης Φάφαλης) (born 17 February 1976 in Munich) is a West German-born, Greek cross-country skier who has competed since 1995. Competing in four Winter Olympics, he earned his best finish of 29th in the individual sprint event at Turin in 2006. Fafalis carried the Greek flag at the opening ceremonies of those same games.

His best finish at the FIS Nordic World Ski Championships was 18th in the team sprint event at Sapporo in 2007.

Fafalis' best World cup finish was 17th in a sprint event at the Czech Republic in 2005.
