= Hellenic Olympic Committee =

- Country: Greece
- Code: GRE
- Created: 3 February 1894
- Recognized: 1895
- Continental Association: EOC
- Headquarters: Chalandri, Greece
- President: Isidoros Kouvelos
- Secretary General: Stefanos Chandakas
- Website: www.hoc.gr

Hellenic Olympic Committee headquarters, in Chalandri

The Hellenic Olympic Committee (HOC, Greek: Ελληνική Ολυμπιακή Επιτροπή; IOC Code: GRE) is the governing Olympic body of Greece. It is the second-oldest National Olympic Committee in the world (after the French Olympic Committee), it organizes the country's representatives at the Olympic Games and other multi-sport events. It is based in Chalandri, a suburb of the Athens agglomeration.

Members of the committee are 27 sports federations, which elect the Executive Council composed of the president and six members.

== History ==
The history of the Hellenic Olympic Committee is strongly connected to the history of the revival of the Olympic Games. It was founded in Athens on February 3, 1894, with the name Committee of the Olympic Games (Greek: Επιτροπής Ολυμπιακών Αγώνων, E.O.A.) and became a member of the International Olympic Committee in 1895. E.O.A organized 1896 Summer Olympics, first in modern history, in restored Panathenaic Stadium, who was held from 6 to 15 April.

In 1899, the Greek government gave to E.O.A. full responsibility to cooperate with other sport federations, spreads the Olympic spirit and its structure of the 12 members, led by the president.

When Athens was chosen as the host city of the 2004 Summer Olympics during the 106th IOC Session held in Lausanne on 5 September 1997, in 2000 the E.O.A. changed its name to the Hellenic Olympic Committee.

From the I Mediterranean Games in Alexandria in 1951, Hellenic Olympic Committee is responsible for their holding every four years as part of preparations for the Olympic Games.

The HOC organises the lighting ceremony of the Olympic flame in Ancient Olympia for ceremonies of the Summer and Winter Olympic Games, as well as the Olympic torch relay over Greece, before the Flame continues its journey in the host country of the Olympic Games.

== List of presidents ==
President	Term
Crown Prince Constantine	1894–1912
King Constantine I	1913
Crown Prince George	1914–1917
Miltiadis Negrepontis	1918–1920
Crown Prince George	1921–1922
King George II	1922–1923
George Averoff	1924–1930
Ioannis Drosopoulos	1930–1936
Crown Prince Paul	1936–1948
King Paul	1948–1952
Konstantinos Georgakopoulos; Ioannis Ketseas	1953–1954
Crown Prince Constantine	1955–1964
Princess Irene	1965–1968
Theodosios Papathanasiadis	1969–1973
Spyridon Vellianitis	1973–1974
Apostolos Nikolaidis	1974–1976
Georgios Athanasiadis	1976–1983
Aggelos Lempesis	1983–1984
Lambis Nikolaou	1985–1992
Antonios Tzikas	1993–1996
Lambis Nikolaou	1997–2004
Minos Kyriakou	2004–2009
Spyros Capralos	2009–2025
Isidoros Kouvelos	2025–present

== IOC members ==
Member	Term
Demetrius Vikelas	1894–1899
Alexandros Merkatis	1899–1925
George Averoff	1926–1930
Nikolaos Politis	1930–1933
Aggelos Volanakis	1933–1963
Ioannis Ketseas	1946–1965
Constantine II of Greece	1963–1974
Pyrros Lappas	1965–1980
Epaminondas Petralias	1975–1977
Nikolaos Nisiotis	1978–1986
Nikos Filaretos	1981–2005
Lambis Nikolaou	1986–2015
Spyros Capralos	2019–present

== Executive committee ==
The committee of the HOC is represented by:

- President: Isidoros Kouvelos
- Members: Stelios Aggeloudis, Manolis Kolympadis, Antonis Nikolopoulos, Voula Kozompoli

== Member federations ==
The Hellenic National Federations are the organizations that coordinate all aspects of their individual sports. They are responsible for training, competition and development of their sports. There are currently 26 Olympic Summer and one Winter Sport Federations in Greece.

National Federation	Summer or Winter	Headquarters
Hellenic Archery Federation	Summer	Athens
Hellenic Athletics Federation	Summer	Nea Smyrni, Athens
Hellenic Badminton Federation	Summer	OAKA, Athens
Hellenic Basketball Federation	Summer	OAKA, Athens
Ελληνική Ομοσπονδία Πυγμαχίας	Summer	Athens
Hellenic Canoe-Kayak Federation	Summer	Piraeus, Athens
Hellenic Cycling Federation	Summer	OAKA, Athens
Hellenic Equestrian Federation	Summer	Markopoulo Mesogaias
Hellenic Fencing Federation	Summer	Athens
Hellenic Football Federation	Summer	Athens
Hellenic Golf Federation	Summer	Glyfada, Athens
Hellenic Gymnastics Federation	Summer	OAKA, Athens
Hellenic Handball Federation	Summer	Athens
Hellenic Judo Federation	Summer	Ano Liosia, Athens
Hellenic Karate Federation	Summer	Ano Liosia, Athens
Hellenic Modern Pentathlon Federation	Summer	Athens
Hellenic Federation of Mountaineering and Climbing	Summer	Athens
Hellenic Rowing Federation	Summer	Piraeus, Athens
Hellenic Sailing Federation	Summer	Kallithea, Athens
Hellenic Shooting Federation	Summer	Athens
Hellenic Swimming Federation	Summer	Nea Smyrni, Athens
Hellenic Table Tennis Federation	Summer	Athens
Hellenic Taekwondo Federation	Summer	Athens
Hellenic Volleyball Federation	Summer	Amaroussion, Athens
Hellenic Weightlifting Federation	Summer	OAKA, Athens
Hellenic Winter Sports Federation	Winter	Athens
Hellenic Wrestling Federation	Summer	Ano Liosia, Athens

== Objects of the HOC ==
The Hellenic Olympic Committee operates a number of sports facilities: Panathenaic Stadium, Karaiskakis Stadium, Athens Olympic Aquatic Centre, the education facilities of the International Olympic Academy, Museum of Modern Olympic Games in Ancient Olympia; and participates in the management of OAKA.

== See also ==
- Greece at the Olympics
