= Alpine skiing at the 1980 Winter Olympics – Women's slalom =

Women's slalom at the XIII Olympic Winter Games
- Alpine skiing
- Venue: Whiteface Mountain
- Date: February 23, 1980
- Competitors: 47 from 28 nations
- Winning time: 1:25.09

Medalists
1st place, gold medalist(s)		Hanni Wenzel	Liechtenstein
2nd place, silver medalist(s)		Christa Kinshofer	West Germany
3rd place, bronze medalist(s)		Erika Hess	Switzerland

The Women's slalom competition of the Lake Placid 1980 Olympics was held at Whiteface Mountain.

The defending world champion was Lea Solkner of Austria, while Austria's Regina Sackl was the defending World Cup slalom champion and France's Perrine Pelen led the 1980 World Cup.

== Results ==
Rank	Name	Country	Run 1	Run 2	Total	Difference
1st place, gold medalist(s)	Hanni Wenzel	Liechtenstein	0:42.50	0:42.59	1:25.09	-
2nd place, silver medalist(s)	Christa Kinshofer	West Germany	0:42.74	0:43.76	1:26.50	+1.41
3rd place, bronze medalist(s)	Erika Hess	Switzerland	0:43.50	0:44.39	1:27.89	+2.80
4	Maria Rosa Quario	Italy	0:43.63	0:44.29	1:27.92	+2.83
5	Claudia Giordani	Italy	0:44.42	0:44.70	1:29.12	+4.03
6	Nadezhda Andreyeva	Soviet Union	0:43.42	0:45.78	1:29.20	+4.11
7	Daniela Zini	Italy	0:45.08	0:44.14	1:29.22	+4.13
8	Christin Cooper	United States	0:44.23	0:45.05	1:29.28	+4.19
9	Ann Melander	Sweden	0:44.51	0:45.31	1:29.82	+4.73
10	Wilma Gatta	Italy	0:44.46	0:45.48	1:29.94	+4.85
11	Cindy Nelson	United States	0:44.96	0:45.89	1:30.85	+5.76
12	Åsa Svedmark	Sweden	0:46.06	0:45.45	1:31.51	+6.42
13	Ingrid Eberle	Austria	0:45.21	0:46.50	1:31.71	+6.62
14	Petra Wenzel	Liechtenstein	0:47.47	0:45.87	1:33.34	+8.25
15	Kathy Kreiner	Canada	0:48.06	0:46.72	1:34.78	+9.69
16	Valentina Iliffe	Great Britain	0:48.88	0:49.68	1:38.56	+13.47
17	Jacqui Cowderoy	Australia	0:49.91	0:49.78	1:39.69	+14.60
18	Wang Guizhen	China	0:59.26	0:59.75	1:59.01	+33.92
19	Farida Rahmed	Lebanon	1:22.47	1:06.00	2:28.47	+63.38
-	Perrine Pelen	France	0:43.46	DNF	-	-
-	Fabienne Serrat	France	0:44.40	DNF	-	-
-	Abbi Fisher	United States	0:45.10	DNF	-	-
-	Irene Epple	West Germany	0:45.14	DNF	-	-
-	Brigitte Nansoz	Switzerland	0:45.52	DNF	-	-
-	Steinunn Sæmundsdóttir	Iceland	0:46.50	DNF	-	-
-	Fiona Johnson	New Zealand	DNF	-	-	-
-	Lina Aristodimou	Cyprus	DNF	-	-	-
-	Jenny Altermatt	Australia	DNF	-	-	-
-	Anne Robb	Great Britain	DNF	-	-	-
-	Kirstin Cairns	Great Britain	DNF	-	-	-
-	Ana María Rodríguez	Spain	DNF	-	-	-
-	Jana Gantnerová-Šoltýsová	Czechoslovakia	DNF	-	-	-
-	Nuša Tome	Yugoslavia	DNF	-	-	-
-	Metka Jerman	Yugoslavia	DNF	-	-	-
-	Marie-Theres Nadig	Switzerland	DNF	-	-	-
-	Torill Fjeldstad	Norway	DNF	-	-	-
-	Anja Zavadlav	Yugoslavia	DNF	-	-	-
-	Anne-Flore Rey	France	DNF	-	-	-
-	Anna-Karin Hesse	Sweden	DNF	-	-	-
-	Ursula Konzett	Liechtenstein	DNF	-	-	-
-	Marina Laurencon	France	DNF	-	-	-
-	Pamela Behr	West Germany	DNF	-	-	-
-	Regina Sackl	Austria	DNF	-	-	-
-	Regine Mösenlechner	West Germany	DNF	-	-	-
-	Tamara McKinney	United States	DNF	-	-	-
-	Annemarie Moser-Pröll	Austria	DNF	-	-	-
-	Lea Sölkner	Austria	DNF	-	-	-
