= Alpine skiing at the 1984 Winter Olympics – Women's slalom =

Women's slalom at the XIV Olympic Winter Games
- Alpine skiing
- Venue: Jahorina
- Date: February 17, 1984
- Competitors: 45 from 19 nations
- Winning time: 1:36.47

Medalists
1st place, gold medalist(s)		Paola Magoni	Italy
2nd place, silver medalist(s)		Perrine Pelen	France
3rd place, bronze medalist(s)		Ursula Konzett	Liechtenstein

The Women's slalom competition of the Sarajevo 1984 Olympics was held at Jahorina.

The defending world champion was Erika Hess of Switzerland, who was also the defending World Cup slalom champion and the leader of the 1984 World Cup.

== Results ==
Rank	Name	Country	Run 1	Run 2	Total	Difference
1st place, gold medalist(s)	Paola Magoni	Italy	0:48.85	0:47.62	1:36.47	-
2nd place, silver medalist(s)	Perrine Pelen	France	0:48.85	0:48.53	1:37.38	+0.91
3rd place, bronze medalist(s)	Ursula Konzett	Liechtenstein	0:48.81	0:48.69	1:37.50	+1.03
4	Roswitha Steiner	Austria	0:49.22	0:48.62	1:37.84	+1.37
5	Erika Hess	Switzerland	0:49.57	0:48.34	1:37.91	+1.44
6	Małgorzata Tłalka-Mogore	Poland	0:49.20	0:48.77	1:37.97	+1.50
7	Maria Rosa Quario	Italy	0:49.68	0:48.31	1:37.99	+1.52
8	Anni Kronbichler	Austria	0:48.84	0:49.21	1:38.05	+1.58
9	Daniela Zini	Italy	0:49.32	0:48.83	1:38.15	+1.68
10	Olga Charvátová	Czechoslovakia	0:49.65	0:49.01	1:38.66	+2.19
11	Monika Hess	Switzerland	0:49.55	0:49.12	1:38.67	+2.20
12	Maria Epple	West Germany	0:49.63	0:49.14	1:38.77	+2.30
13	Ewa Grabowska	Poland	0:50.06	0:49.56	1:39.62	+3.15
14	Nadezhda Andreyeva	Soviet Union	0:50.80	0:49.42	1:40.22	+3.75
15	Mateja Svet	Yugoslavia	0:51.12	0:49.73	1:40.85	+4.38
16	Carole Merle	France	0:51.68	0:52.62	1:44.30	+7.83
17	Jolanda Kindle	Liechtenstein	0:53.13	0:53.30	1:46.43	+9.96
18	Magdalena Birkner	Argentina	0:56.36	0:58.39	1:54.75	+18.28
19	Jin Xuefei	China	1:02.74	1:03.30	2:06.04	+29.57
20	Wang Guizhen	China	1:05.14	1:01.60	2:06.74	+30.27
21	Lina Aristodimou	Cyprus	1:08.53	1:11.11	2:19.64	+43.17
-	Christelle Guignard	France	0:48.71	DNF	-	-
-	Petra Wenzel	Liechtenstein	0:49.80	DNF	-	-
-	Blanca Fernández Ochoa	Spain	0:50.06	DNF	-	-
-	Nuša Tome	Yugoslavia	0:50.69	DNF	-	-
-	Andreja Leskovšek	Yugoslavia	0:52.00	DQ	-	-
-	Tamara McKinney	United States	DNF	-	-	-
-	Christin Cooper	United States	DNF	-	-	-
-	Dorota Tłalka-Mogore	Poland	DNF	-	-	-
-	Brigitte Oertli	Switzerland	DNF	-	-	-
-	Anja Zavadlav	Yugoslavia	DNF	-	-	-
-	Lea Sölkner	Austria	DNF	-	-	-
-	Alexandra Mařasová	Czechoslovakia	DNF	-	-	-
-	Ivana Valešová	Czechoslovakia	DNF	-	-	-
-	Fulvia Stevenin	Italy	DNF	-	-	-
-	Andrea Bédard	Canada	DNF	-	-	-
-	Dolores Fernández Ochoa	Spain	DNF	-	-	-
-	Veronika Wallinger-Stallmaier	Austria	DNF	-	-	-
-	Lesley Beck	Great Britain	DNF	-	-	-
-	Liliana Ichim	Romania	DNF	-	-	-
-	Teresa Bustamente	Argentina	DNF	-	-	-
-	Nanna Leifsdóttir	Iceland	DNF	-	-	-
-	Magdalena Saint Antonin	Argentina	DNF	-	-	-
-	Anne-Flore Rey	France	DQ	-	-	-
-	Gabriela Angaut	Argentina	DQ	-	-	-
