= Alpine skiing at the 1984 Winter Olympics – Women's giant slalom =

Women's giant slalom at the XIV Olympic Winter Games
- Alpine skiing
- Venue: Jahorina
- Date: February 13, 1984
- Competitors: 54 from 20 nations
- Winning time: 2:20.98

Medalists
1st place, gold medalist(s)		Debbie Armstrong	United States
2nd place, silver medalist(s)		Christin Cooper	United States
3rd place, bronze medalist(s)		Perrine Pelen	France

Women's Giant Slalom
- Location: Jahorina
- Vertical: 337 m (1,106 ft)
- Top elevation: 1,665 m (5,463 ft)
- Base elevation: 1,328 m (4,357 ft)

The Women's giant slalom competition of the Sarajevo 1984 Olympics was held at Jahorina on Monday, February 13. Because of weather delays with the downhills, this was the first alpine event of these Olympics.

The defending world champion was Erika Hess of Switzerland, while American Tamara McKinney was the defending World Cup giant slalom champion, and Hess led the current season. Defending Olympic champion Hanni Wenzel was banned from these Olympics.

American Debbie Armstrong won the gold medal, teammate Christin Cooper took the silver, and Perrine Pelen of France was the bronze medalist. McKinney was fourth and Hess was seventh.

Entering the Olympics, the twenty-year-old Armstrong's only World Cup top ten finish in giant slalom was a fifth place in late January, and her sole career World Cup podium came three weeks before that; a third in a Super-G.

== Results ==
The race was started at 10:00 local time, (UTC+1), and the second run began at 13:30. At the starting gate, the skies were clear, the temperature was −14.2 °C (6 °F), and the snow condition was hard. For the second run it was snowing lightly at −12.2 °C (10 °F).

Rank	Bib	Name	Country	Run 1	Run 2	Total	Difference
1st place, gold medalist(s)	15	Debbie Armstrong	United States	1:08.97	1:12.01	2:20.98	—
2nd place, silver medalist(s)	9	Christin Cooper	United States	1:08.87	1:12.51	2:21.38	+0.40
3rd place, bronze medalist(s)	2	Perrine Pelen	France	1:09.64	1:11.76	2:21.40	+0.42
4	7	Tamara McKinney	United States	1:10.11	1:11.72	2:21.83	+0.85
5	21	Marina Kiehl	West Germany	1:09.70	1:12.33	2:22.03	+1.05
6	8	Blanca Fernández Ochoa	Spain	1:09.52	1:12.62	2:22.14	+1.16
7	13	Erika Hess	Switzerland	1:10.54	1:11.97	2:22.51	+1.53
8	6	Olga Charvátová	Czechoslovakia	1:09.94	1:12.63	2:22.57	+1.59
9	11	Liisa Savijarvi	Canada	1:10.31	1:12.42	2:22.73	+1.75
10	5	Anne-Flore Rey	France	1:10.09	1:12.86	2:22.95	+1.97
11	12	Carole Merle	France	1:10.73	1:12.54	2:23.27	+2.29
12	1	Michela Figini	Switzerland	1:10.58	1:12.76	2:23.34	+2.36
13	4	Maria Epple	West Germany	1:10.40	1:13.25	2:23.65	+2.67
14	24	Anni Kronbichler	Austria	1:11.40	1:12.77	2:24.17	+3.19
15	19	Monika Hess	Switzerland	1:10.90	1:13.68	2:24.58	+3.60
16	36	Andreja Leskovšek	Yugoslavia	1:11.20	1:13.41	2:24.61	+3.63
17	26	Diana Haight	Canada	1:11.27	1:13.39	2:24.66	+3.68
18	3	Cindy Nelson	United States	1:11.44	1:13.44	2:24.88	+3.90
19	16	Petra Wenzel	Liechtenstein	1:11.26	1:13.68	2:24.94	+3.96
20	39	Veronika Šarec	Yugoslavia	1:11.71	1:13.30	2:25.01	+4.03
21	10	Irene Epple	West Germany	1:11.64	1:13.88	2:25.52	+4.54
22	29	Nuša Tome	Yugoslavia	1:12.18	1:14.03	2:26.21	+5.23
23	34	Mateja Svet	Yugoslavia	1:11.88	1:14.34	2:26.22	+5.24
24	22	Michaela Gerg-Leitner	West Germany	1:12.18	1:14.10	2:26.28	+5.30
25	20	Daniela Zini	Italy	1:12.07	1:14.26	2:26.33	+5.35
26	35	Alexandra Mařasová	Czechoslovakia	1:12.59	1:13.78	2:26.37	+5.39
27	28	Roswitha Steiner	Austria	1:12.09	1:14.47	2:26.56	+5.58
28	40	Ivana Valešová	Czechoslovakia	1:12.17	1:14.54	2:26.71	+5.73
29	41	Nadezhda Andreyeva	Soviet Union	1:12.46	1:14.39	2:26.85	+5.87
30	43	Dorota Tłalka-Mogore	Poland	1:11.91	1:14.99	2:26.90	+5.92
31	42	Ewa Grabowska	Poland	1:12.45	1:15.10	2:27.55	+6.57
32	31	Paola Magoni	Italy	1:12.56	1:15.31	2:27.87	+6.89
33	23	Laurie Graham	Canada	1:12.89	1:15.53	2:28.42	+7.44
34	32	Sylvia Eder	Austria	1:13.00	1:16.03	2:29.03	+8.05
35	51	Liliana Ichim	Romania	1:14.17	1:17.91	2:32.08	+11.10
36	50	Teresa Bustamente	Argentina	1:15.33	1:18.86	2:34.19	+13.21
37	49	Michèle Brigitte Dombard	Belgium	1:15.85	1:18.94	2:34.79	+13.81
38	48	Nanna Leifsdóttir	Iceland	1:14.82	1:20.02	2:34.84	+13.86
39	52	Magdalena Birkner	Argentina	1:17.64	1:22.06	2:39.70	+18.72
40	53	Gabriela Angaut	Argentina	1:19.63	1:23.53	2:43.16	+22.18
41	54	Geraldina Bobbio	Argentina	1:21.90	1:25.61	2:47.51	+26.53
42	56	Jin Xuefei	China	1:22.45	1:27.90	2:50.35	+29.37
43	58	Lina Aristodimou	Cyprus	1:29.22	1:34.23	3:03.45	+42.47
-	25	Ursula Konzett	Liechtenstein	1:10.93	DNF	-	-
-	14	Fabienne Serrat	France	1:11.52	DNF	-	-
-	33	Andrea Bédard	Canada	1:12.03	DQ	-	-
-	38	Dolores Fernández Ochoa	Spain	1:12.05	DNF	-	-
-	27	Fulvia Stevenin	Italy	1:12.09	DNF	-	-
-	37	Jana Gantnerová-Šoltýsová	Czechoslovakia	1:13.92	DNF	-	-
-	45	Kate Rattray	New Zealand	1:14.67	DNF	-	-
-	17	Elisabeth Kirchler	Austria	DNF	-	-	-
-	44	Jolanda Kindle	Liechtenstein	DQ	-	-	-
-	55	Wang Guizhen	China	DQ	-	-	-
-	30	Ann Melander	Sweden	DNS	-	-	-
-	46	Ondine McGlashen	Australia	DNS	-	-	-
-	47	Marilla Guss	Australia	DNS	-	-	-
-	57	Delia Parate	Romania	DNS	-	-	-
