= Alpine skiing at the 1980 Winter Olympics – Women's giant slalom =

Women's giant slalom at the XIII Olympic Winter Games
- Alpine skiing
- Venue: Whiteface Mountain
- Date: February 20–21, 1980
- Competitors: 48 from 21 nations
- Winning time: 2:41.66

Medalists
| 1st place, gold medalist(s) | | Hanni Wenzel | Liechtenstein |
| 2nd place, silver medalist(s) | | Irene Epple | West Germany |
| 3rd place, bronze medalist(s) | | Perrine Pelen | France |

The Women's giant slalom competition of the Lake Placid 1980 Olympics was held at Whiteface Mountain on February 20–21.

The defending world champion was Maria Epple of West Germany, while West Germany's Christa Kinshofer was the defending World Cup giant slalom champion and Liechtenstein's Hanni Wenzel led the 1980 World Cup.

== Results ==
| Rank | Name | Country | Run 1 | Run 2 | Total | Difference |
|---|---|---|---|---|---|---|
| 1st place, gold medalist(s) | Hanni Wenzel | Liechtenstein | 1:14.33 | 1:27.33 | 2:41.66 | — |
| 2nd place, silver medalist(s) | Irene Epple | West Germany | 1:14.75 | 1:27.37 | 2:42.12 | +0.46 |
| 3rd place, bronze medalist(s) | Perrine Pelen | France | 1:15.45 | 1:26.96 | 2:42.41 | +0.75 |
| 4 | Fabienne Serrat | France | 1:15.43 | 1:26.99 | 2:42.42 | +0.76 |
| 5 | Christa Kinshofer-Güthlein | West Germany | 1:15.19 | 1:27.44 | 2:42.63 | +0.97 |
| 6 | Annemarie Moser-Pröll | Austria | 1:15.64 | 1:27.55 | 2:43.19 | +1.53 |
| 7 | Christin Cooper | United States | 1:16.61 | 1:28.10 | 2:44.71 | +3.05 |
| 8 | Maria Epple | West Germany | 1:16.20 | 1:29.36 | 2:45.56 | +3.90 |
| 9 | Kathy Kreiner | Canada | 1:17.19 | 1:28.56 | 2:45.75 | +4.09 |
| 10 | Claudia Giordani | Italy | 1:17.72 | 1:28.55 | 2:46.27 | +4.61 |
| 11 | Anna-Karin Hesse | Sweden | 1:17.24 | 1:29.78 | 2:47.02 | +5.36 |
| 12 | Nadezhda Andreyeva | Soviet Union | 1:17.44 | 1:29.65 | 2:47.09 | +5.43 |
| 13 | Cindy Nelson | United States | 1:17.42 | 1:29.90 | 2:47.32 | +5.66 |
| 14 | Ingrid Eberle | Austria | 1:18.18 | 1:29.24 | 2:47.42 | +5.76 |
| 15 | Ann Melander | Sweden | 1:16.84 | 1:30.79 | 2:47.63 | +5.97 |
| 16 | Brigitte Nansoz | Switzerland | 1:18.09 | 1:30.11 | 2:48.20 | +6.54 |
| 17 | Heidi Preuss | United States | 1:17.54 | 1:30.83 | 2:48.37 | +6.71 |
| 18 | Blanca Fernández Ochoa | Spain | 1:18.37 | 1:30.62 | 2:48.99 | +7.33 |
| 19 | Petra Wenzel | Liechtenstein | 1:18.75 | 1:30.28 | 2:49.03 | +7.37 |
| 20 | Metka Jerman | Yugoslavia | 1:18.79 | 1:30.42 | 2:49.21 | +7.55 |
| 21 | Jana Gantnerová-Šoltýsová | Czechoslovakia | 1:18.60 | 1:31.05 | 2:49.65 | +7.99 |
| 22 | Torill Fjeldstad | Norway | 1:18.26 | 1:31.40 | 2:49.66 | +8.00 |
| 23 | Nuša Tome | Yugoslavia | 1:18.78 | 1:30.94 | 2:49.72 | +8.06 |
| 24 | Åsa Svedmark | Sweden | 1:18.90 | 1:31.47 | 2:50.37 | +8.71 |
| 25 | Anne-Flore Rey | France | 1:20.03 | 1:31.38 | 2:51.41 | +9.75 |
| 26 | Anja Zavadlav | Yugoslavia | 1:20.54 | 1:31.52 | 2:52.06 | +10.40 |
| 27 | Anne Robb | Great Britain | 1:20.79 | 1:35.29 | 2:56.08 | +14.42 |
| 28 | Jenny Altermatt | Australia | 1:22.09 | 1:36.48 | 2:58.57 | +16.91 |
| 29 | Steinunn Sæmundsdóttir | Iceland | 1:23.52 | 1:35.89 | 2:59.41 | +17.75 |
| 30 | Fiona Johnson | New Zealand | 1:24.62 | 1:36.04 | 3:00.66 | +19.00 |
| 31 | Valentina Iliffe | Great Britain | 1:23.33 | 1:39.43 | 3:02.76 | +21.10 |
| 32 | Anna Archibald | New Zealand | 1:25.82 | 1:40.32 | 3:06.14 | +24.48 |
| 33 | Lina Aristodimou | Cyprus | 1:39.78 | 1:57.07 | 3:36.85 | +55.19 |
| 34 | Farida Rahmed | Lebanon | 1:40.50 | 1:58.99 | 3:39.49 | +57.83 |
| 35 | Wang Guizhen | China | 1:32.41 | 2:12.18 | 3:44.59 | +62.93 |
| - | Erika Hess | Switzerland | 1:15.27 | DNF | - | - |
| - | Regine Mösenlechner | West Germany | 1:17.70 | DNF | - | - |
| - | Lea Sölkner | Austria | 1:18.30 | DNS | - | - |
| - | Marina Laurencon | France | 1:18.49 | DNF | - | - |
| - | Maria Rosa Quario | Italy | 1:18.54 | DNF | - | - |
| - | Jacqui Cowderoy | Australia | 1:24.90 | DQ | - | - |
| - | Ana María Rodríguez | Spain | DNF | - | - | - |
| - | Wanda Bieler | Italy | DNF | - | - | - |
| - | Tamara McKinney | United States | DNF | - | - | - |
| - | Regina Sackl | Austria | DNF | - | - | - |
| - | Daniela Zini | Italy | DNF | - | - | - |
| - | Ursula Konzett | Liechtenstein | DNF | - | - | - |
| - | Marie-Theres Nadig | Switzerland | DNF | - | - | - |
