= Biathlon at the 1984 Winter Olympics – Sprint =

Men's biathlon sprint at the XIV Olympic Winter Games
- Venue: Igman - Veliko Polke
- Dates: February 14, 1984
- Competitors: 64 from 25 nations
- Winning time: 30:53.8

Medalists
| 1st place, gold medalist(s) | | Eirik Kvalfoss | Norway |
| 2nd place, silver medalist(s) | | Peter Angerer | West Germany |
| 3rd place, bronze medalist(s) | | Matthias Jacob | East Germany |

The Men's 10 kilometre sprint biathlon competition at the 1984 Winter Olympics was held on 14 February, at Igman - Veliko Polke. Competitors raced over three loops of the skiing course, shooting two times, once prone and once standing. Each miss was penalized by requiring the competitor to race over a 150-metre penalty loop.

== Summary ==
Eirik Kvalfoss, the two-time defending world champion in the sprint, had had the fastest ski time in the individual race, but struggled with his shooting, ending up with bronze. He had no such problems in the sprint, as he missed two shots, but was able to make up for it with his ski speed, being the only man to get below 31 minutes. Peter Angerer, the individual champion, missed just once to win silver, as he did in the 1983 worlds, while Matthias Jacob shot clear to win bronze.

== Results ==
| Rank | Bib | Name | Country | Time | Penalties (P+S) | Deficit |
|---|---|---|---|---|---|---|
| 1st place, gold medalist(s) | 45 | Eirik Kvalfoss | Norway | 30:53.8 | 2 (1+1) | – |
| 2nd place, silver medalist(s) | 52 | Peter Angerer | West Germany | 31:02.4 | 1 (1+0) | +0:08.6 |
| 3rd place, bronze medalist(s) | 18 | Matthias Jacob | East Germany | 31:10.5 | 0 (0+0) | +0:16.7 |
| 4 | 3 | Kjell Søbak | Norway | 31:19.7 | 1 (0+1) | +0:25.9 |
| 5 | 37 | Algimantas Šalna | Soviet Union | 31:20.8 | 2 (0+2) | +0:27.0 |
| 6 | 43 | Yvon Mougel | France | 31:32.9 | 2 (0+2) | +0:39.1 |
| 7 | 63 | Frank-Peter Roetsch | East Germany | 31:49.8 | 2 (2+0) | +0:56.0 |
| 8 | 30 | Fritz Fischer | West Germany | 32:04.7 | 2 (1+1) | +1:10.9 |
| 9 | 58 | Jan Matouš | Czechoslovakia | 32:10.5 | 3 (1+2) | +1:16.7 |
| 10 | 1 | Juri Kashkarov | Soviet Union | 32:15.2 | 2 (0+2) | +1:21.4 |
| 11 | 54 | Sergei Bulygin | Soviet Union | 32:19.1 | 1 (0+1) | +1:25.3 |
| 12 | 14 | Toivo Mäkikyrö | Finland | 32:22.5 | 2 (0+2) | +1:28.7 |
| 13 | 42 | Vítězslav Jureček | Czechoslovakia | 32:26.5 | 0 (0+0) | +1:32.7 |
| 14 | 51 | Vladimir Velichkov | Bulgaria | 32:27.6 | 0 (0+0) | +1:33.8 |
| 15 | 32 | Tapio Piipponen | Finland | 32:28.7 | 1 (1+0) | +1:34.9 |
| 16 | 13 | Walter Pichler | West Germany | 32:30.2 | 1 (1+0) | +1:36.4 |
| 17 | 28 | Frank Ullrich | East Germany | 32:40.2 | 3 (1+2) | +1:46.4 |
| 18 | 21 | Terje Krokstad | Norway | 33:00.9 | 4 (1+3) | +2:07.1 |
| 19 | 17 | Gottlieb Taschler | Italy | 33:04.9 | 1 (0+1) | +2:11.1 |
| 20 | 10 | Bill Carow | United States | 33:05.8 | 0 (0+0) | +2:12.0 |
| 21 | 9 | Sven Fahlén | Sweden | 33:12.9 | 2 (0+2) | +2:19.1 |
| 22 | 62 | Alfred Eder | Austria | 33:17.9 | 2 (0+2) | +2:24.1 |
| 23 | 6 | Zdeněk Hák | Czechoslovakia | 33:19.3 | 3 (1+2) | +2:25.5 |
| 24 | 64 | Leif Andersson | Sweden | 33:21.9 | 3 (1+2) | +2:28.1 |
| 25 | 36 | Ronnie Adolfsson | Sweden | 33:27.0 | 4 (2+2) | +2:33.2 |
| 26 | 47 | Jim Wood | Great Britain | 33:40.2 | 2 (1+1) | +2:46.4 |
| 27 | 41 | Francis Mougel | France | 33:50.4 | 4 (3+1) | +2:56.6 |
| 28 | 2 | Éric Claudon | France | 34:05.1 | 2 (1+1) | +3:11.3 |
| 29 | 56 | Andreas Zingerle | Italy | 34:07.5 | 5 (4+1) | +3:13.7 |
| 30 | 44 | Shoichi Kinoshita | Japan | 34:12.2 | 1 (1+0) | +3:18.4 |
| 31 | 34 | Yuri Mitev | Bulgaria | 34:17.4 | 1 (1+0) | +3:23.6 |
| 32 | 53 | Beat Meier | Switzerland | 34:22.1 | 4 (1+3) | +3:28.3 |
| 33 | 55 | Zsolt Kovács | Hungary | 34:23.9 | 1 (1+0) | +3:30.1 |
| 34 | 46 | Risto Punkka | Finland | 34:28.5 | 4 (1+3) | +3:34.7 |
| 35 | 25 | Johann Passler | Italy | 34:31.4 | 4 (4+0) | +3:37.6 |
| 36 | 35 | Rudolf Horn | Austria | 34:46.0 | 4 (3+1) | +3:52.2 |
| 37 | 33 | Gábor Mayer | Hungary | 34:46.3 | 3 (0+3) | +3:52.5 |
| 38 | 5 | Spas Zlatev | Bulgaria | 34:51.2 | 2 (1+1) | +3:57.4 |
| 39 | 19 | Walter Hörl | Austria | 35:02.6 | 5 (2+3) | +4:08.8 |
| 40 | 39 | Josh Thompson | United States | 35:10.5 | 4 (2+2) | +4:16.7 |
| 41 | 50 | Gheorghe Berdar | Romania | 35:20.2 | 3 (1+2) | +4:26.4 |
| 42 | 49 | Donald Nielsen, Jr. | United States | 35:23.3 | 3 (2+1) | +4:29.5 |
| 43 | 4 | Yoshinobu Murase | Japan | 35:35.9 | 3 (1+2) | +4:42.1 |
| 44 | 31 | Graeme Ferguson | Great Britain | 35:37.3 | 4 (2+2) | +4:43.5 |
| 45 | 16 | Song Yongjun | China | 35:49.4 | 2 (2+0) | +4:55.6 |
| 46 | 38 | Liu Hongwang | China | 35:56.3 | 3 (1+2) | +5:02.5 |
| 47 | 22 | Isao Yamase | Japan | 35:57.0 | 4 (2+2) | +5:03.2 |
| 48 | 20 | Francisc Forika | Romania | 35:59.8 | 4 (3+1) | +5:06.0 |
| 49 | 48 | Andrej Lanišek | Yugoslavia | 36:16.0 | 5 (1+4) | +5:22.2 |
| 50 | 27 | Andrew Paul | Australia | 36:32.4 | 3 (1+2) | +5:38.6 |
| 51 | 11 | Trevor King | Great Britain | 36:34.4 | 5 (2+3) | +5:40.6 |
| 52 | 23 | Imre Lestyan | Romania | 36:42.8 | 4 (2+2) | +5:49.0 |
| 53 | 57 | Song Wenbin | China | 36:53.4 | 3 (0+3) | +5:59.6 |
| 54 | 26 | Marjan Vidmar | Yugoslavia | 37:08.1 | 3 (2+1) | +6:14.3 |
| 55 | 40 | Cecilio Fernández | Spain | 39:27.5 | 2 (1+1) | +8:33.7 |
| 56 | 59 | Manuel García | Spain | 40:16.6 | 6 (3+3) | +9:22.8 |
| 57 | 12 | Tomislav Lopatić | Yugoslavia | 40:18.2 | 9 (5+4) | +9:24.4 |
| 58 | 7 | József Lihi | Hungary | 40:21.0 | 6 (2+4) | +9:27.2 |
| 59 | 8 | Oscar di Lovera | Argentina | 40:25.7 | 3 (2+1) | +9:31.9 |
| 60 | 24 | Luis Ríos | Argentina | 40:36.5 | 4 (2+2) | +9:42.7 |
| 61 | 61 | Víctor Figueroa | Argentina | 41:04.2 | 5 (4+1) | +10:10.4 |
| 62 | 60 | Hwang Byung-Dae | South Korea | 44:43.2 | 6 (3+3) | +13:49.4 |
| 63 | 29 | Ueng Ming-Yih | Chinese Taipei | 45:38.1 | 4 (2+2) | +14:44.3 |
| - | 15 | Hernán Carazo | Costa Rica | DNF | - | - |
