= Biathlon at the 1984 Winter Olympics – Individual =

Men's biathlon individual at the XIV Olympic Winter Games
- Venue: Igman - Veliko Polke
- Dates: February 11, 1984
- Competitors: 63 from 25 nations
- Winning time: 1:11:52.7

Medalists
1st place, gold medalist(s)		Peter Angerer	West Germany
2nd place, silver medalist(s)		Frank-Peter Roetsch	East Germany
3rd place, bronze medalist(s)		Eirik Kvalfoss	Norway

The Men's 20 kilometre individual biathlon competition at the 1984 Winter Olympics was held on 11 February, at Igman - Veliko Polke. Each miss resulted in one minute being added to a competitor's skiing time.

== Summary ==
Frank Ullrich was the two-time defending World champion, and defending Olympic silver medalist, but his ski pace in Sarajevo was a couple of minutes behind the top competitors, and he ended up 5th. The world champion in the 10 km sprint, Eirik Kvalfoss, had the fastest ski time, but missed five shots, ending up with bronze. The gold went to West Germany's Peter Angerer, who had the best shooting record in the competition, and also the second-fastest ski time, leaving him almost a minute-and-a-half clear of his closest pursuer, East German Frank-Peter Roetsch.

== Results ==
Rank	Bib	Name	Country	Ski Time	Penalties (P+S+P+S)	Result	Deficit
1st place, gold medalist(s)	59	Peter Angerer	West Germany	1:09:52.7	2 (0+1+1+0)	1:11:52.7	–
2nd place, silver medalist(s)	42	Frank-Peter Roetsch	East Germany	1:10:21.4	3 (0+2+0+1)	1:13:21.4	+1:28.7
3rd place, bronze medalist(s)	31	Eirik Kvalfoss	Norway	1:09:02.4	5 (2+1+1+1)	1:14:02.4	+2:09.7
4	26	Yvon Mougel	France	1:10:53.1	4 (1+2+0+1)	1:14:53.1	+3:00.4
5	50	Frank Ullrich	East Germany	1:11:53.7	3 (1+0+1+1)	1:14:53.7	+3:01.0
6	56	Rolf Storsveen	Norway	1:11:23.9	4 (1+0+1+2)	1:15:23.9	+3:31.2
7	23	Fritz Fischer	West Germany	1:11:49.7	4 (2+0+0+2)	1:15:49.7	+3:57.0
8	61	Leif Andersson	Sweden	1:13:19.3	3 (1+2+0+0)	1:16:19.3	+4:26.6
9	57	Andreas Zingerle	Italy	1:12:21.7	4 (0+3+0+1)	1:16:21.7	+4:29.0
10	37	Jan Matouš	Czechoslovakia	1:11:39.0	5 (0+1+0+4)	1:16:39.0	+4:46.3
11	9	Sven Fahlén	Sweden	1:12:10.8	6 (1+0+3+2)	1:18:10.8	+6:18.1
12	28	Tapio Piipponen	Finland	1:12:38.4	6 (2+2+2+0)	1:18:38.4	+6:45.7
13	54	Vladimir Velichkov	Bulgaria	1:13:47.1	5 (0+2+0+3)	1:18:47.1	+6:54.4
14	52	Jim Wood	Great Britain	1:14:55.8	4 (0+1+1+2)	1:18:55.8	+7:03.1
15	48	Zdeněk Hák	Czechoslovakia	1:13:05.5	6 (2+2+0+2)	1:19:05.5	+7:12.8
16	46	Arto Jääskeläinen	Finland	1:14:23.3	5 (1+2+0+2)	1:19:23.3	+7:30.6
17	14	Sergei Bulygin	Soviet Union	1:12:28.0	7 (1+1+2+3)	1:19:28.0	+7:35.3
18	19	Keijo Tiitola	Finland	1:14:32.8	5 (1+1+2+1)	1:19:32.8	+7:40.1
19	8	Marco Zanon	Italy	1:15:59.9	4 (0+1+2+1)	1:19:59.9	+8:07.2
20	30	Ronnie Adolfsson	Sweden	1:12:12.2	8 (2+4+0+2)	1:20:12.2	+8:19.5
21	58	Francis Mougel	France	1:13:20.5	7 (1+4+1+1)	1:20:20.5	+8:27.8
22	15	Ernst Reiter	West Germany	1:15:37.4	5 (2+1+0+2)	1:20:37.4	+8:44.7
23	3	Christian Poirot	France	1:14:54.2	6 (1+1+0+4)	1:20:54.2	+9:01.5
24	16	Odd Lirhus	Norway	1:11:55.0	9 (1+5+1+2)	1:20:55.0	+9:02.3
25	2	Jaromír Šimůnek	Czechoslovakia	1:15:04.3	6 (1+3+1+1)	1:21:04.3	+9:11.6
26	29	Lyle Nelson	United States	1:14:05.4	7 (2+3+1+1)	1:21:05.4	+9:12.7
27	5	Spas Zlatev	Bulgaria	1:16:10.9	5 (1+1+0+3)	1:21:10.9	+9:18.2
28	32	Adriano Darioli	Italy	1:13:14.0	8 (3+1+0+4)	1:21:14.0	+9:21.3
29	10	Holger Wick	East Germany	1:12:19.1	9 (3+2+2+2)	1:21:19.1	+9:26.4
30	6	Franz Schuler	Austria	1:16:23.0	5 (0+1+2+2)	1:21:23.0	+9:30.3
31	53	Beat Meier	Switzerland	1:14:24.4	7 (0+2+2+3)	1:21:24.4	+9:31.7
32	43	Dmitry Vasilyev	Soviet Union	1:14:09.2	8 (3+1+1+3)	1:22:09.2	+10:16.5
33	55	Glen Eberle	United States	1:18:15.0	4 (2+2+0+0)	1:22:15.0	+10:22.3
34	60	Alfred Eder	Austria	1:16:52.6	6 (1+2+1+2)	1:22:52.6	+10:59.9
35	47	Juri Kashkarov	Soviet Union	1:11:53.8	11 (3+2+2+4)	1:22:53.8	+11:01.1
36	22	Rudolf Horn	Austria	1:15:10.8	8 (1+2+3+2)	1:23:10.8	+11:18.1
37	17	Charles MacIvor	Great Britain	1:16:37.5	7 (2+2+2+1)	1:23:37.5	+11:44.8
38	11	Yoshinobu Murase	Japan	1:17:39.1	6 (2+1+0+3)	1:23:39.1	+11:46.4
39	49	Shoichi Kinoshita	Japan	1:16:49.8	7 (1+2+1+3)	1:23:49.8	+11:57.1
40	21	Yuri Mitev	Bulgaria	1:16:05.4	8 (1+2+2+3)	1:24:05.4	+12:12.7
41	63	Andrej Lanišek	Yugoslavia	1:18:23.1	6 (0+4+0+2)	1:24:23.1	+12:30.4
42	39	Isao Yamase	Japan	1:18:09.6	7 (1+3+2+1)	1:25:09.6	+13:16.9
43	62	Imre Lestyan	Romania	1:19:26.6	6 (2+1+1+2)	1:25:26.6	+13:33.9
44	24	Tony McLeod	Great Britain	1:17:34.5	8 (4+1+0+3)	1:25:34.5	+13:41.8
45	64	Zsolt Kovács	Hungary	1:19:18.7	7 (3+2+0+2)	1:26:18.7	+14:26.0
46	1	Marjan Vidmar	Yugoslavia	1:18:32.1	8 (2+3+2+1)	1:26:32.1	+14:39.4
47	38	Andrew Paul	Australia	1:21:38.7	5 (0+2+1+2)	1:26:38.7	+14:46.0
48	33	Jure Velepec	Yugoslavia	1:21:05.8	6 (3+1+1+1)	1:27:05.8	+15:13.1
49	18	Mihai Rădulescu	Romania	1:19:18.1	8 (0+2+4+2)	1:27:18.1	+15:25.4
50	41	Vladimir Todaşcă	Romania	1:20:00.9	8 (1+2+2+3)	1:28:00.9	+16:08.2
51	12	János Spisák	Hungary	1:20:06.9	8 (0+4+1+3)	1:28:06.9	+16:14.2
52	44	Sun Xiaoping	China	1:20:07.1	8 (2+2+2+2)	1:28:07.1	+16:14.4
53	20	Martin Hagen	United States	1:18:19.8	12 (2+4+2+4)	1:30:19.8	+18:27.1
54	27	Liu Hongwang	China	1:19:47.5	12 (3+2+4+3)	1:31:47.5	+19:54.8
55	13	Víctor Figueroa	Argentina	1:27:02.3	7 (2+2+2+1)	1:34:02.3	+22:09.6
56	4	Manuel García	Spain	1:24:12.4	10 (2+3+3+2)	1:34:12.4	+22:19.7
57	40	Cecilio Fernández	Spain	1:25:42.0	9 (3+2+2+2)	1:34:42.0	+22:49.3
58	36	Luis Ríos	Argentina	1:32:17.9	10 (2+2+4+2)	1:42:17.9	+30:25.2
59	34	Ueng Ming-Yih	Chinese Taipei	1:37:07.0	8 (2+2+1+3)	1:45:07.0	+33:14.3
60	45	Hwang Byung-dae	South Korea	1:34:49.9	15 (3+4+4+4)	1:49:49.9	+37:57.2
61	35	Hernán Carazo	Costa Rica	2:13:54.9	11 (3+3+3+2)	2:24:54.9	+73:02.2
-	7	Long Yunzhou	China	DNF	-	(4+4+x+x)	-
-	25	László Palácsik	Hungary	DNF	-	-	-
-	51	Oscar di Lovera	Argentina	DNS	-	-	-
