= Argentina at the 1984 Winter Olympics =

- IOC code: ARG
- NOC: Argentine Olympic Committee
- Website: www.coarg.org.ar (in Spanish)

in Sarajevo
- Competitors: 18 (13 men, 5 women) in 3 sports
- Flag bearer: Teresa Bustamante
- Medals: Gold 0 Silver 0 Bronze 0 Total 0

Winter Olympics appearances (overview)
- 1928; 1932–1936; 1948; 1952; 1956; 1960; 1964; 1968; 1972; 1976; 1980; 1984; 1988; 1992; 1994; 1998; 2002; 2006; 2010; 2014; 2018; 2022; 2026

Argentina competed at the 1984 Winter Olympics in Sarajevo, Yugoslavia.

== Alpine skiing ==
Men

| Athlete | Event | Race 1 | | Race 2 | | Total | |
| Athlete | Event | Time | Rank | Time | Rank | Time | Rank |
|---|---|---|---|---|---|---|---|
| Américo Astete | Downhill | | | | | 2:01.60 | 54 |
| Enrique de Ridder | Downhill | | | | | 1:59.76 | 52 |
| Nicolas van Ditmar | Downhill | | | | | 1:58.86 | 49 |
| Jorge Birkner | Downhill | | | | | 1:54.92 | 45 |
| Nicolas van Ditmar | Giant Slalom | DNF | – | – | – | DNF | – |
| Enrique de Ridder | Giant Slalom | 1:38.49 | 53 | 1:41.33 | 53 | 3:19.82 | 52 |
| Jorge Birkner | Giant Slalom | 1:33.82 | 48 | 1:34.18 | 45 | 3:08.00 | 46 |
| Fernando Enevoldsen | Giant Slalom | 1:33.82 | 48 | 1:34.45 | 46 | 3:08.27 | 47 |
| Fernando Enevoldsen | Slalom | DSQ | – | – | – | DSQ | – |
| Américo Astete | Slalom | 1:04.90 | 42 | DNF | – | DNF | – |
| Nicolas van Ditmar | Slalom | 1:02.30 | 39 | 58.18 | 24 | 2:00.48 | 24 |
| Jorge Birkner | Slalom | 1:00.85 | 37 | 55.70 | 19 | 1:56.55 | 22 |

Women

| Athlete | Event | Race 1 | | Race 2 | | Total | |
| Athlete | Event | Time | Rank | Time | Rank | Time | Rank |
|---|---|---|---|---|---|---|---|
| Teresa Bustamante | Downhill | | | | | 1:21.62 | 30 |
| Geraldina Bobbio | Giant Slalom | 1:21.90 | 48 | 1:25.61 | 41 | 2:47.51 | 41 |
| Gabriela Angaut | Giant Slalom | 1:19.63 | 47 | 1:23.53 | 40 | 2:43.16 | 40 |
| Magdalena Birkner | Giant Slalom | 1:17.64 | 46 | 1:22.06 | 39 | 2:39.70 | 39 |
| Teresa Bustamante | Giant Slalom | 1:15.33 | 44 | 1:18.86 | 36 | 2:34.19 | 36 |
| Gabriela Angaut | Slalom | DSQ | – | – | – | DSQ | – |
| Magdalena Saint Antonin | Slalom | DNF | – | – | – | DNF | – |
| Teresa Bustamante | Slalom | DNF | – | – | – | DNF | – |
| Magdalena Birkner | Slalom | 56.36 | 23 | 58.39 | 18 | 1:54.75 | 18 |

== Biathlon ==
Men

| Event | Athlete | Misses ^{1} | Time | Rank |
|---|---|---|---|---|
| 10 km Sprint | Víctor Figueroa | 5 | 41:04.2 | 61 |
| 10 km Sprint | Luis Ríos | 4 | 40:36.5 | 60 |
| 10 km Sprint | Osccar di Lovera | 3 | 40:25.7 | 59 |

| Event | Athlete | Time | Penalties | Adjusted time ^{2} | Rank |
|---|---|---|---|---|---|
| 20 km | Luis Ríos | 1'32:17.9 | 10 | 1'42:17.9 | 58 |
| 20 km | Víctor Figueroa | 1'27:02.3 | 7 | 1'34:02.3 | 55 |

^{1} A penalty loop of 150 metres had to be skied per missed target.
^{2} One minute added per missed target.

== Cross-country skiing ==
Men

| Event | Athlete | Race | |
| Event | Athlete | Time | Rank |
|---|---|---|---|
| 15 km | Martín Pearson | 54:50.0 | 76 |
| 15 km | Ricardo Holler | 54:34.6 | 75 |
| 15 km | Julio Moreschi | 52:19.1 | 73 |
| 15 km | Norberto von Baumann | 52:08.9 | 72 |
| 30 km | Alejandro Baratta | 2'09:33.1 | 68 |
| 30 km | Ricardo Holler | 2'02:00.4 | 67 |
| 50 km | Ricardo Holler | 3'05:41.2 | 50 |

Men's 4 × 10 km relay

| Athletes | Race | |
| Athletes | Time | Rank |
|---|---|---|
| Julio Moreschi; Norberto von Baumann; Ricardo Holler; Alejandro Baratta | 2'27:07.1 | 16 |
