= Australia at the 1980 Winter Olympics =

- IOC code: AUS
- NOC: Australian Olympic Committee
- Website: www.olympics.com.au

in Lake Placid
- Competitors: 10 in 4 sports
- Flag bearer: Robert McIntyre
- Medals: Gold 0 Silver 0 Bronze 0 Total 0

Winter Olympics appearances (overview)
- 1936; 1948; 1952; 1956; 1960; 1964; 1968; 1972; 1976; 1980; 1984; 1988; 1992; 1994; 1998; 2002; 2006; 2010; 2014; 2018; 2022; 2026

Australia competed at the 1980 Winter Olympics in Lake Placid, United States.

Australia came eleventh in the figure skating pairs, but that was in a field of eleven. Jacqui Cowderoy came seventeenth in the women's slalom, and Colin Coates came eighteenth in the 10000 metres speed skating.

== Alpine skiing ==
Men

Athlete	Event	Final					
Athlete	Event	Run 1	Rank	Run 2	Rank	Total	Rank
Antony Guss	Downhill	—N/a				1:50.22	26
Antony Guss	Giant slalom	1:29.26	47	1:29.53	39	2:58.79	41
Antony Guss	Slalom	1:04.45	35	1:00.65	31	2:05.10	32
Rob McIntyre	Giant slalom	1:28.09	44	1:29.30	38	2:57.39	38
Rob McIntyre	Slalom	Did not finish					

Women

Athlete	Event	Final					
Athlete	Event	Run 1	Rank	Run 2	Rank	Total	Rank
Jenny Altermatt	Giant slalom	1:22.09	33	1:36.48	30	2:58.57	28
Jenny Altermatt	Slalom	Did not finish					
Jacqui Cowderoy	Giant slalom	1:24.90	37	Did not finish			
Jacqui Cowderoy	Slalom	49.91	23	49.78	17	1:39.69	17

== Cross-country skiing ==
Women

Athlete	Event	Race	
Athlete	Event	Time	Rank
Colleen Bolton	5 km	17:22.68	36
Colleen Bolton	10 km	33:56.32	35

== Figure skating ==
Athlete(s)	Event	CF/CD	SP/OD	FS/FD	Total		
Athlete(s)	Event	CF/CD	SP/OD	FS/FD	Ordinals	Points	Rank
Elizabeth Cain & Peter Cain	Pairs	—N/a	10	11	98.0	121.30	11

== Speed skating ==
Athlete	Event	Final	
Athlete	Event	Time	Rank
Mike Richmond	500 m	41.22	32
Mike Richmond	1000 m	1:23.30	34
Mike Richmond	1500 m	2:13.40	32
Colin Coates	1000 m	1:21.68	29
Colin Coates	5000 m	7:27.25	19
Colin Coates	10000 m	15:28.30	18

== See also ==
- Australia at the Winter Olympics
