= Romania at the 1984 Winter Olympics =

- Flag of Romania
- IOC code: ROU (ROM used at these Games)
- NOC: Romanian Olympic and Sports Committee
- Website: www.cosr.ro (in Romanian, English, and French)

in Sarajevo
- Competitors: 19 (16 men, 3 women) in 6 sports
- Flag bearer: Dorel Cristudor
- Medals: Gold 0 Silver 0 Bronze 0 Total 0

Winter Olympics appearances (overview)
- 1928; 1932; 1936; 1948; 1952; 1956; 1960; 1964; 1968; 1972; 1976; 1980; 1984; 1988; 1992; 1994; 1998; 2002; 2006; 2010; 2014; 2018; 2022; 2026

Romania competed at the 1984 Winter Olympics in Sarajevo, Yugoslavia.

== Alpine skiing ==
Men

Athlete	Event	Race 1		Race 2		Total	
Athlete	Event	Time	Rank	Time	Rank	Time	Rank
Mihai Bîră Jr.	Giant Slalom	1:32.04	46	1:34.45	46	3:06.49	45
Zolt Balazs	Giant Slalom	1:31.00	44	1:31.41	41	3:02.41	41
Mihai Bîră Jr.	Slalom	DNF	–	–	–	DNF	–
Zolt Balazs	Slalom	59.01	30	DSQ	–	DSQ	–

Women

Athlete	Event	Race 1		Race 2		Total	
Athlete	Event	Time	Rank	Time	Rank	Time	Rank
Liliana Ichim	Giant Slalom	1:14.17	41	1:17.91	35	2:32.08	35
Liliana Ichim	Slalom	DNF	–	–	–	DNF	–

== Biathlon ==
Men

Event	Athlete	Misses ^{1}	Time	Rank
10 km Sprint	Imre Lestyan	4	36:42.8	52
10 km Sprint	Francisc Forika	4	35:59.8	48
10 km Sprint	Gheorghe Berdar	3	35:20.2	41

Event	Athlete	Time	Penalties	Adjusted time ^{2}	Rank
20 km	Vladimir Todaşcă	1'20:00.9	8	1'28:00.9	50
20 km	Mihai Rădulescu	1'19:18.1	8	1'27:18.1	49
20 km	Imre Lestyan	1'19:26.6	6	1'25:26.6	43

Men's 4 x 7.5 km relay

Athletes	Race		
Athletes	Misses ^{1}	Time	Rank
Vladimir Todaşcă; Mihai Rădulescu; Imre Lestyan; Gheorghe Berdar	2	1'47:44.8	13

^{1} A penalty loop of 150 metres had to be skied per missed target.
^{2} One minute added per missed target.

== Bobsleigh ==
Sled	Athletes	Event	Run 1		Run 2		Run 3		Run 4		Total	
Sled	Athletes	Event	Time	Rank	Time	Rank	Time	Rank	Time	Rank	Time	Rank
ROU-1	Dorin Degan; Cornel Popescu	Two-man	53.90	24	53.57	21	53.18	24	53.41	24	3:34.06	23
ROU-2	Ion Duminicel; Costel Petrariu	Two-man	53.18	19	53.26	16	52.63	16	53.29	22	3:32.36	18

Sled	Athletes	Event	Run 1		Run 2		Run 3		Run 4		Total	
Sled	Athletes	Event	Time	Rank	Time	Rank	Time	Rank	Time	Rank	Time	Rank
ROU-1	Dorin Degan; Cornel Popescu; Gheorghe Lixandru; Costel Petrariu	Four-man	50.58	6	50.88	5	51.06	8	51.24	8	3:23.76	7

== Cross-country skiing ==
Women

Event	Athlete	Race	
Event	Athlete	Time	Rank
5 km	Livia Reit	18:51.6	32
10 km	Livia Reit	36:20.9	42

== Luge ==
Men

Athlete	Run 1		Run 2		Run 3		Run 4		Total	
Athlete	Time	Rank	Time	Rank	Time	Rank	Time	Rank	Time	Rank
Ioan Apostol	46.388	7	DSQ	–	–	–	–	–	DSQ	–

(Men's) doubles

Athletes	Run 1		Run 2		Total	
Athletes	Time	Rank	Time	Rank	Time	Rank
Ioan Apostol; Laurenţiu Bălănoiu	42.918	11	42.742	10	1:25.660	11

Women

Athlete	Run 1		Run 2		Run 3		Run 4		Total	
Athlete	Time	Rank	Time	Rank	Time	Rank	Time	Rank	Time	Rank
Gabriela Haja	42.710	11	43.553	19	42.668	13	42.509	13	2:51.440	14

== Speed skating ==
Men

Event	Athlete	Race	
Event	Athlete	Time	Rank
500 m	Dezsö Jenei	39.72	25
1000 m	Dezsö Jenei	1:21.14	34
1500 m	Tibor Kopacz	2:02.38	22
5000 m	Tibor Kopacz	7:32.69	19
10,000 m	Tibor Kopacz	15:23.95	24
