= Maria Rodriguez =

Maria Rodriguez may refer to:

== Entertainers ==
- Chelo Rodríguez (María Consuelo Rodríguez, 1941/2–2026), Venezuelan actress
- Maria Rodríguez Soto (born 1986), Spanish actress
- Mala Rodríguez (born 1979), Spanish hip-hop singer

== Politicians ==
- María Rodríguez de Alba (born 1959), Mexican politician
- María Cecilia Rodríguez (born 1967), Argentine politician
- María Rodríguez Preciado (born 1978), Mexican politician
- Maria Rodriguez-Gregg (born 1981), member of the New Jersey General Assembly

== Sportspeople ==
- María Rodríguez (volleyball), (born 1946), Mexican volleyball player
- María Hilda Rodríguez Rodríguez (born 1955), Spanish boccia player
- María Ángeles Rodríguez (born 1957), Spanish field hockey player and 1992 Olympic gold medalist
- María José Rodríguez (born 1958), Spanish rhythmic gymnast
- Ana María Rodríguez (alpine skier) (born 1962), Spanish former alpine skier
- Maria Rodriguez (Algerian swimmer) in Swimming at the 2007 World Aquatics Championships – Women's 200 metre butterfly
- Maria Rodriguez (Venezuelan swimmer) (born 1978), competed in Swimming at the 2007 World Aquatics Championships – Women's 100 metre butterfly
- María Eugenia Rodríguez (born 1994), Venezuelan footballer
- María Rodríguez (bowler), see Colombia at the 2019 Pan American Games

== Others ==
- María Ignacia Rodríguez de Velasco y Osorio Barba (1778–1851), Mexico City socialite
- Ana María Rodríguez (writer) (born 1958), American children's author
- María Fernanda Rodríguez (fl. 2023), Venezuelan university professor and activist

== Characters ==
- Maria Figueroa Rodriguez, a character on the American children's television show Sesame Street
- Maria Rodriguez, a character in the Archie Comics series

== See also ==
- Maria Isabel Rodriguez (disambiguation)
- Ana María Rodríguez (disambiguation)
