= Hungary at the 1984 Winter Olympics =

- IOC code: HUN
- NOC: Hungarian Olympic Committee
- Website: www.olimpia.hu (in Hungarian and English)

in Sarajevo
- Competitors: 9 (7 men and 2 women) in 4 sports
- Flag bearer: Gábor Mayer
- Medals: Gold 0 Silver 0 Bronze 0 Total 0

Winter Olympics appearances (overview)
- 1924; 1928; 1932; 1936; 1948; 1952; 1956; 1960; 1964; 1968; 1972; 1976; 1980; 1984; 1988; 1992; 1994; 1998; 2002; 2006; 2010; 2014; 2018; 2022; 2026

Hungary competed at the 1984 Winter Olympics in Sarajevo, Yugoslavia.

== Alpine skiing ==
Men

Athlete	Event	Race 1		Race 2		Total	
Athlete	Event	Time	Rank	Time	Rank	Time	Rank
Péter Kozma	Giant Slalom	DNF	–	–	–	DNF	–
Péter Kozma	Slalom	59.14	31	55.24	17	1:54.38	18

== Biathlon ==
Men

Event	Athlete	Misses ^{1}	Time	Rank
10 km Sprint	József Lihi	6	40:21.0	58
10 km Sprint	Gábor Mayer	3	34:46.3	37
10 km Sprint	Zsolt Kovács	1	34:23.9	33

Event	Athlete	Time	Penalties	Adjusted time ^{2}	Rank
20 km	László Palácsik	DNF	–	DNF	–
20 km	János Spisák	1'20:06.9	8	1'28:06.9	51
20 km	Zsolt Kovács	1'19:18.7	7	1'26:18.7	45

Men's 4 x 7.5 km relay

Athletes	Race		
Athletes	Misses ^{1}	Time	Rank
János Spisák; Gábor Mayer; László Palácsik; Zsolt Kovács	4	1'48:40.0	14

^{1} A penalty loop of 150 metres had to be skied per missed target.
^{2} One minute added per missed target.

== Figure skating ==
Ice Dancing

Athletes	CD	OD	FD	TFP	Rank
Klára Engi; Attila Tóth	17	17	16	33.0	16

== Speed skating ==
Women

Event	Athlete	Race	
Event	Athlete	Time	Rank
500 m	Emese Nemeth-Hunyady	43.70	19
1000 m	Emese Nemeth-Hunyady	1:29.36	30
