= Ana María Rodríguez =

Ana María Rodríguez may refer to:

- Ana María Rodríguez (writer) (born 1958), American children's author
- Ana María Rodríguez (alpine skier) (born 1962), Spanish former alpine skier
- Ana Maria Rodriguez (politician) (born 1977), Republican member of the Florida Senate

== See also ==
- Maria Rodriguez (disambiguation)
- Ana Rodríguez (disambiguation)
