= Strâmba (Mureș) =

Strâmba Tekerő-patak
- Location within Romania

Location
- Country: Romania
- Counties: Harghita County
- Villages: Valea Strâmbă, Chileni, Suseni

Physical characteristics
- Mouth: Mureș
  - location: Suseni
  - coordinates: 46.6629°N 25.5497°E
- Length: 14 km (8.7 mi)
- Basin size: 24 km^{2} (9.3 sq mi)

Basin features
- Progression: Mureș→ Tisza→ Danube→ Black Sea

The Strâmba (Hungarian: Tekerő-patak, meaning "Worming Creek") is a right tributary of the river Mureș in Transylvania, Romania. It discharges into the Mureș in Suseni. Its length is 14 km (8.7 mi) and its basin size is 24 km^{2} (9.3 sq mi).
