= Senetea =

Senetea Szenéte-patak
- Location within Romania

Location
- Country: Romania
- Counties: Harghita County
- Villages: Senetea

Physical characteristics
- Source: Harghita Mountains
- Mouth: Mureș
  - location: Senetea
  - coordinates: 46.636°N 25.591°E
- Length: 8 km (5.0 mi)
- Basin size: 29 km^{2} (11 sq mi)

Basin features
- Progression: Mureș→ Tisza→ Danube→ Black Sea
- Tributaries
  - right: Fagu Roșu

The Senetea (Hungarian: Szenéte-patak [ˈsɛneːtɛ pɒtɒk]) is a small river in the Harghita Mountains, Harghita County, central Romania. It is a left tributary of the river Mureș. It flows through the municipality Suseni, and joins the Mureș in the village Senetea. Its length is 8 km (5.0 mi) and its basin size is 29 km^{2} (11 sq mi). It is fed by several smaller streams, including Fagu Roșu.
