= Iacobeni =

Iacobeni may refer to:

- Iacobeni, Sibiu, a commune in Sibiu County, Romania
- Iacobeni, Suceava, a commune in Suceava County, Romania
- Iacobeni, a village in Dângeni Commune, Botoșani County, Romania
- Iacobeni, a village in Ceanu Mare Commune, Cluj County, Romania
- Iacobeni, a village in Plăieșii de Jos Commune, Harghita County, Romania
- Iacobeni, a village in Vlădeni Commune, Iași County, Romania
- Pădurea Iacobeni, a village in Frata Commune, Cluj County
