= Forika =

Forika is a Romanian surname. Notable people with the surname include:

- Francisc Forika (born 1954), Romanian biathlete
- Réka Forika (born 1989), Romanian biathlete
