= Ana Rodríguez =

Ana Rodríguez or Ana Rodriguez may refer to:

- Ana Rodríguez de Lobos (1907–1997), Chilean politician
- Ana Rodríguez (singer) (born 1974), Cuban singer
- Ana Rodríguez (footballer) (born 2002), Panamanian footballer
- Ana Rodriguez (Miss Texas USA) (born 1986), American beauty pageant winner
- Ana Rodriguez (Manitoba politician), politician from Manitoba
- Ana Rodriguez (scientist), parasitologist
- Ana María Rodríguez (disambiguation)
