= Amigorena =

Amigorena is a surname. Notable people with the surname include:

- Mike Amigorena (born 1972), Argentine actor
- Santiago Amigorena (born 1962), Argentine film director, producer and screenwriter
- Sebastian Amigorena (born 1960), Argentine immunologist
