= Gheorghe Vilmoș =

Romanian biathlete (1941–2001)

Gheorghe Vilmoș (3 February 1941 – 16 December 2001) was a Romanian biathlete who competed in the 1964 Winter Olympics, 1968 Winter Olympics, and 1972 Winter Olympics.

He was born in Valea Strâmbă, Harghita County (at that time Tekerőpatak, Hungary) and was affiliated with the sports club Dinamo Brașov. He died in Brașov at age 60.

== Olympic results ==
Event	Place	Date	Venue
20 km	5	4 February 1964	Innsbruck
20 km	22	12 February 1968	Grenoble
4 × 7.5 km	7	15 February 1968	Grenoble
20 km	32	9 February 1972	Sapporo
4 × 7.5 km	9	11 February 1972	Sapporo
