= Maria Isabel Rodriguez =

María Isabel Rodríguez may refer to:

- María Isabel Rodríguez (government official), former Minister of Health of El Salvador (2009–2014); former Rector of the University of El Salvador (1999–2008)
- Misa Rodríguez (María Isabel Rodríguez Rivero, born 1999), Spanish football goalkeeper
- María Isabel (María Isabel López Rodríguez), winner of the Junior Eurovision Song Contest 2004
- María Isabel Rodríguez Lineros, known as Lucía (born 1964), represented Spain in the 1982 Eurovision Song Contest
- Maria Isabel Rodriguez, co-author of two novels with André Launay

== See also ==
- Maria Rodriguez (disambiguation)
- Isabel Rodriguez (disambiguation)
