= Friðrik Friðriksson =

Icelandic footballer

Personal information
- Full name: Friðrik Þór Friðriksson
- Date of birth: 6 October 1964 (age 62)
- Place of birth: Iceland
- Position: Goalkeeper

Senior career*
Years	Team	Apps	(Gls)
1982–1983	Fram		
1984	Breiðablik	18	(0)
1985–1987	Fram	54	(0)
1988–1989	B1909	36	(0)
1990–1991	Þór Akureyri	36	(0)
1992–1998	ÍBV	88	(0)

International career
1981	Iceland U17	2	(0)
1985–1986	Iceland U21	5	(0)
1982–1995	Iceland	26	(0)
- * Club domestic league appearances and goals

Friðrik Þór Friðriksson (born 6 October 1964) is an Icelandic former international football goalkeeper.

He played club football for Fram Reykjavik, Breiðablik, Fram again, B1909 (Denmark), Þór Akureyri and ÍBV.

Friðrik won 26 caps for the senior Iceland team, the first in a 4–0 friendly win in the Faroe Islands on 2 August 1982.

Former Olympic alpine skier Nanna Leifsdóttir is Friðrik's wife. Their daughter is Iceland women's national football team player Fanndís Friðriksdóttir.
