= Spain at the 1980 Winter Olympics =

- IOC code: ESP
- NOC: Spanish Olympic Committee
- Website: www.coe.es (in Spanish)

in Lake Placid
- Competitors: 8 (5 men, 3 women) in 3 sports
- Flag bearer: Francisco Fernández Ochoa
- Medals: Gold 0 Silver 0 Bronze 0 Total 0

Winter Olympics appearances (overview)
- 1936; 1948; 1952; 1956; 1960; 1964; 1968; 1972; 1976; 1980; 1984; 1988; 1992; 1994; 1998; 2002; 2006; 2010; 2014; 2018; 2022; 2026; 2030

Spain competed at the 1980 Winter Olympics in Lake Placid, United States.

== Alpine skiing ==
Men

Athlete	Event	Race 1		Race 2		Total	
Athlete	Event	Time	Rank	Time	Rank	Time	Rank
Francisco Fernández Ochoa	Downhill					1:50.69	27
Francisco Fernández Ochoa	Giant Slalom	1:23.11	29	1:23.47	18	2:46.58	22
Jorge García	Giant Slalom	1:23.03	28	1:24.05	24	2:47.08	23
Jorge Pérez	Giant Slalom	1:22.06	19	1:22.82	13	2:44.88	14
Jorge Pérez	Slalom	DNF	–	–	–	DNF	–
Jorge García	Slalom	DNF	–	–	–	DNF	–
Francisco Fernández Ochoa	Slalom	57.31	26	54.30	21	1:51.61	22

Women

Athlete	Event	Race 1		Race 2		Total	
Athlete	Event	Time	Rank	Time	Rank	Time	Rank
Ana María Rodríguez	Giant Slalom	DNF	–	–	–	DNF	–
Blanca Fernández Ochoa	Giant Slalom	1:18.37	22	1:30.62	18	2:48.99	18
Ana María Rodríguez	Slalom	DNF	–	–	–	DNF	–

== Cross-country skiing ==
Men

Event	Athlete	Race	
Event	Athlete	Time	Rank
15 km	José Giro	51:30.06	55
15 km	Emiliano Morlans	50:42.33	53
30 km	Emiliano Morlans	1'46:28.42	49
30 km	José Giro	1'41:57.97	47

== Figure skating ==
Women

Athlete	CF	SP	FS	Points	Places	Rank
Gloria Mas-Gil	21	20	21	126.56	190	21
