= Petre Hârtopeanu =

German painter

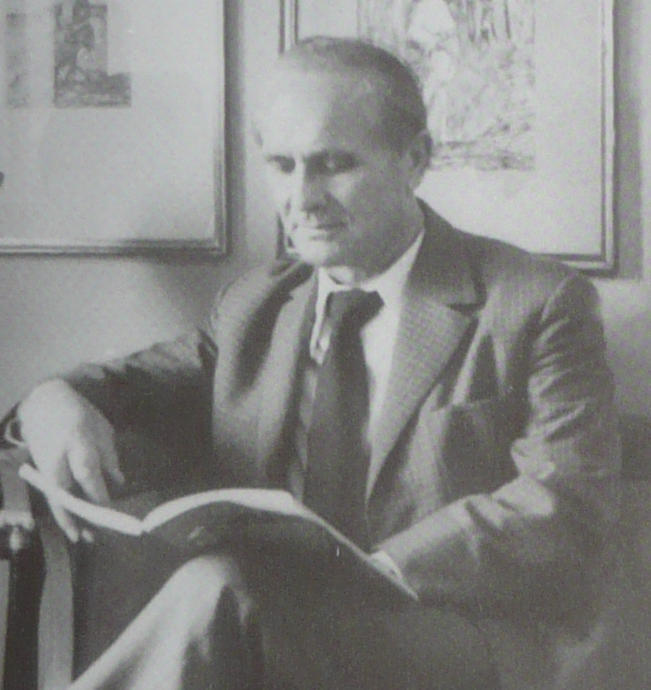
- Born: 15 June 1913; Dângeni, Botoșani County, Kingdom of Romania
- Died: March 22, 2001 (aged 87); Frankfurt, Germany
- Education: Nicolae Tonitza
- Known for: painting
- Movement: Post-Impressionism; Expressionism

Petre Hârtopeanu (15 June 1913, Dângeni, Botoșani County, Romania — 22 March 2001, Frankfurt-am-Main) was a Romanian-German painter and art professor.

== Life ==
Hârtopeanu began his studies and work in Iași. He studied at the Iași Academy of Fine Arts, where he had Nicolae Tonitza as a professor in 1937. He later became a professor and dean at the Academy of Fine Arts.

After emigrating in 1970 from Romania, he lived in Frankfurt, West Germany. Hârtopeanu was married to Frida Klamer, a medical doctor, and had two daughters.

== Art ==
Beginning in 1975, he was a member of the Association for Free and Applied Arts EV Darmstadt, for decades a fixed place in the Darmstadt art life. From 1950, he had numerous exhibitions at home and abroad.

His paintings are an expression of his intense search for the perfect effect of a particular composition. His paintings of natural or cultural landscapes were light and airy, determined by the play of light on the scene. His work often portrayed still lifes using a clever arrangement with alluring colors and subtle lighting. The symbols in his still lifes are often flowers, the glorification of God in his works. Plants, often tree-lined avenues represent the four seasons and symbolize the annual flow.

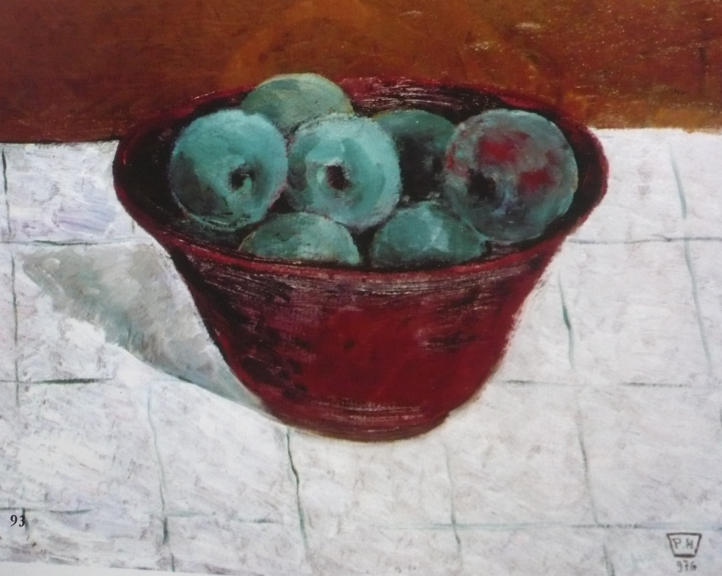

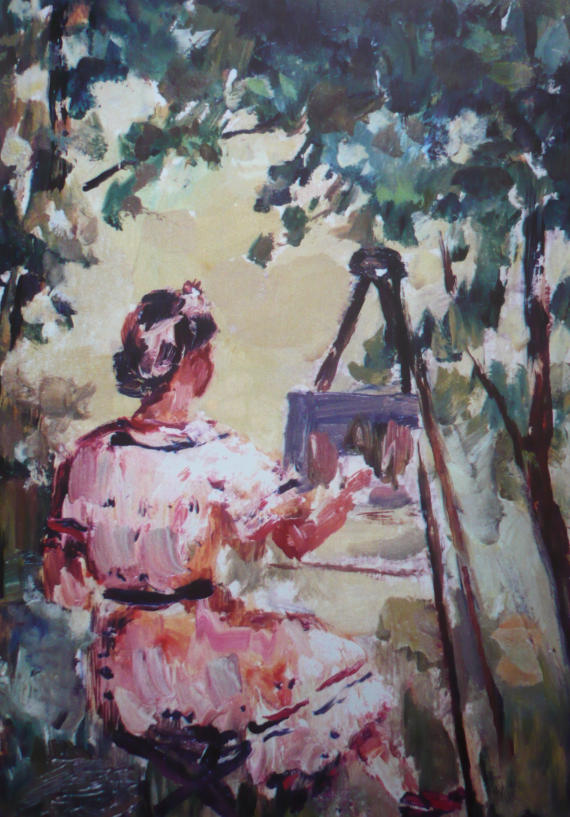

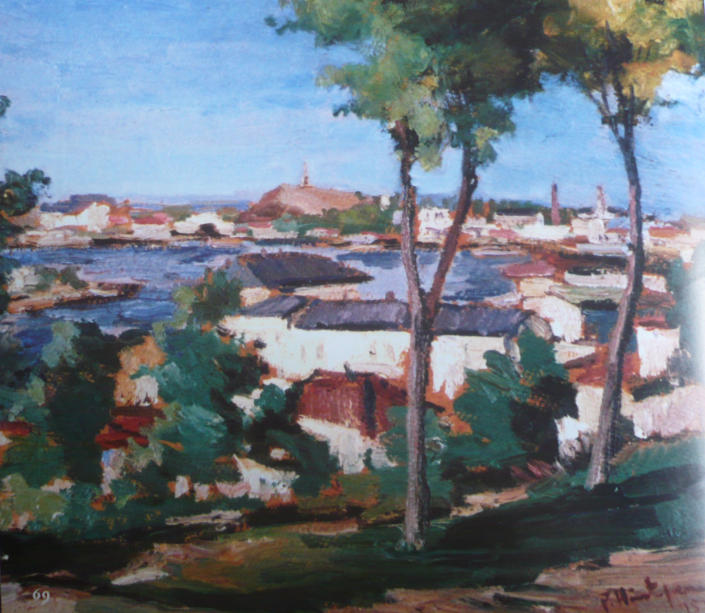

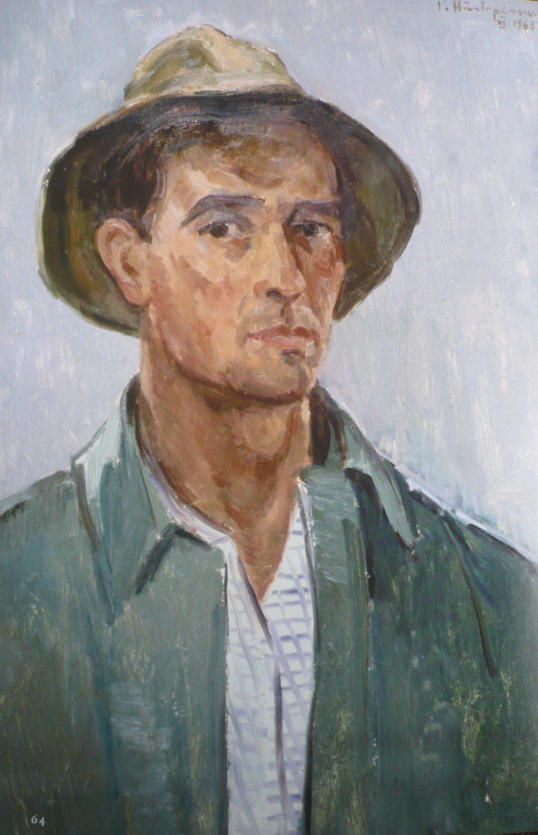

== Books ==
- Allgemeines Lexikon der bildenden Künstler des XX. Jahrhunderts
- Who's who in Western Europe von Ernest Kay - Europe - 1981 ... S-752 45 Uppsala, Sweden Hartopeanu. Petru. b 15 June 1913
- Hârtopeanu. Editura ARC 2000, București 2003, ISBN 973-99718-6-5
