= Vítězslav Jureček =

Czech biathlete (1960–2011)

Personal information
- Nationality: Czech
- Born: 25 May 1960; Šumperk, Czechoslovakia
- Died: 18 May 2011 (aged 50)

Sport
- Sport: Biathlon

Vítězslav Jureček (25 May 1960 – 18 May 2011) was a Czech biathlete. He competed in the 10 km sprint event at the 1984 Winter Olympics.
