= Janka Boga =

Hungarian writer and teacher

Janka Boga Dénesné (31 January 1886 – 4 October 1963) was a Hungarian writer and teacher.

Born in Gyergyóújfalu (now Suseni, Romania) in 1886, Boga worked as a teacher in Kecskemét and retired in 1952. In 1920, she started publishing her writings in several local publications, and Szeged was the place for the first performances of her theatre plays.

== Works ==
- Vezeklés (Kecskemét, 1930)
- Légy az élettársam (Bp., 1934)
- Él-e még a jóság? (Kecskemét, 1948)
