= Isabel Rodriguez =

Isabel Rodriguez may refer to:

- Isabel Rodríguez
- Isabel Rodríguez García
- Izzy Rodriguez

== See also ==
- Maria Isabel Rodriguez (disambiguation)
