= Fanndís Friðriksdóttir =

Icelandic footballer (born 1990)

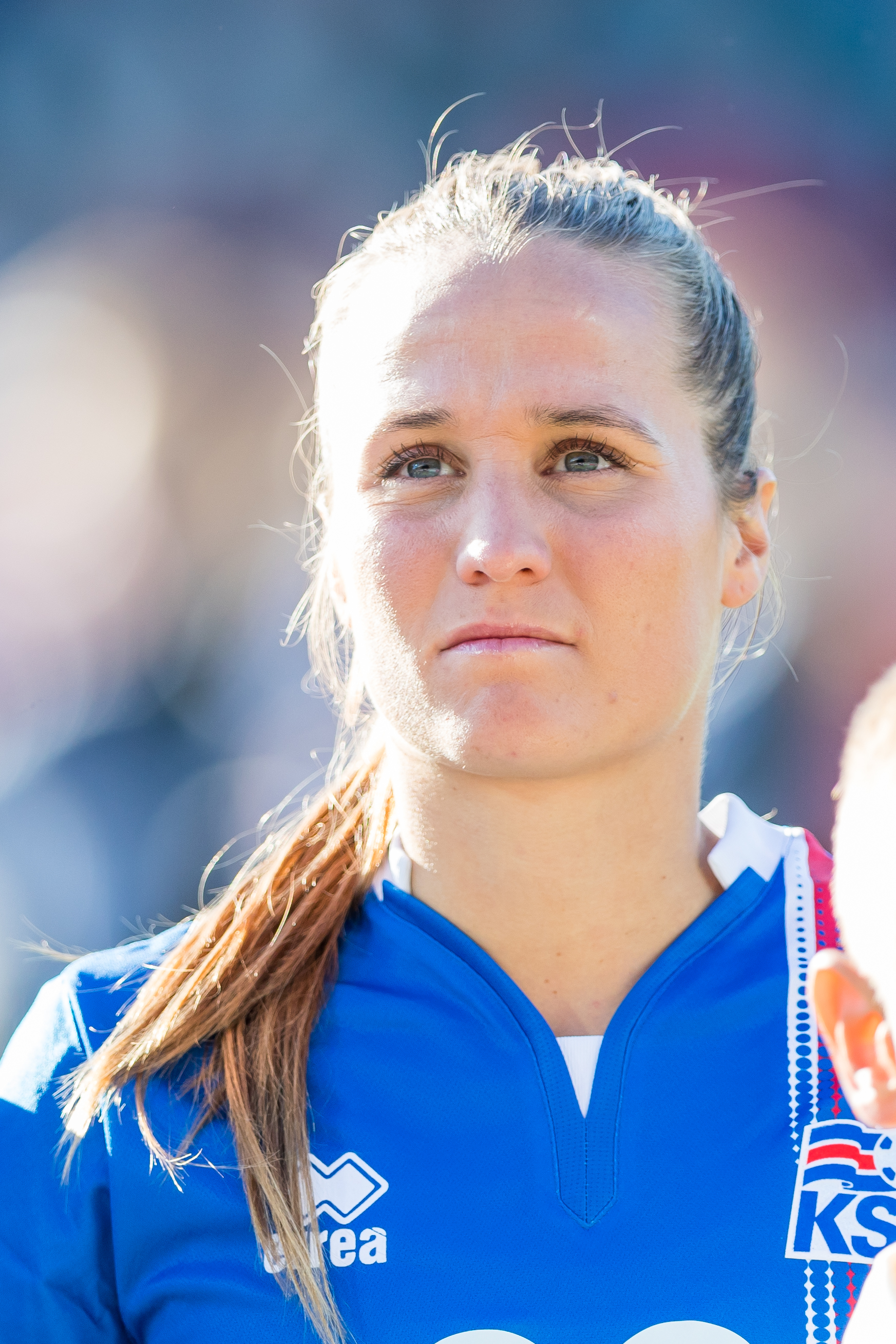
- Fanndís Friðriksdóttir lined up for Iceland in October 2017

Personal information
- Full name: Fanndís Friðriksdóttir
- Date of birth: 9 May 1990 (age 36)
- Place of birth: Akureyri, Iceland
- Positions: Left winger; forward

Youth career
- –2004: ÍBV

Senior career*
Years	Team	Apps	(Gls)
2005–2012	Breiðablik	107	(50)
2012–2013	Kolbotn	23	(7)
2013–2014	Arna-Bjørnar	4	(1)
2014–2017	Breiðablik	66	(47)
2017–2018	Olympique de Marseille	19	(1)
2018–2025	Valur	105	(32)
2018–2019	→ Adelaide United (loan)	11	(2)

International career^{‡}
2005–2007	Iceland U-17	12	(1)
2006–2009	Iceland U-19	20	(11)
2009–	Iceland	110	(17)
- * Club domestic league appearances and goals as of 17 November 2025 ‡ National team caps and goals as of 10 March 2020

Fanndís Friðriksdóttir (born 9 May 1990) is an Icelandic former women's footballer who played as a left winger. She spent the 2017–2018 season with Olympique de Marseille in the French Division 1 Féminine and has previously played in the Úrvalsdeild kvenna for Breiðablik and the Norwegian Toppserien for Kolbotn and Arna-Bjørnar. Fanndís has been a part of the Iceland's national team since 2009 and represented her country at the 2009, 2013 and 2017 editions of the UEFA Women's Championship.

== Club career ==
Born in Akureyri, Fanndís grew up in Vestmannaeyjar where she start playing in the youth teams of ÍBV before moving to Kópavogur in 2004, to play professionally for Breiðablik.

After eight seasons at the Icelandic Úrvalsdeild kvenna with Breiðablik, where she scored 50 goals in 107 league matches, Fanndís decided to join Norwegian Toppserien club Kolbotn, signing a year contract on 6 December 2012. Ahead of her second season in Norway, she moved from Kolbotn to Arna-Bjørnar in December 2013.

On 15 May 2014, Fanndís was released from her contract by Arna-Bjørnar after requesting a move back to Iceland to play for Breiðablik. As the request happened during Icelandic's last players transfer registration day, it was only confirmed on the following day (16 May 2014), that Fanndís was successfully registered as a Breiðablik player, her second spell at the club.

At the end of the 2017 season, after four seasons of her second spell at Breiðablik, she had a combined total (both spells) of 104 goals scored in 197 matches in all Icelandic domestic competitions, of which 97 goals were scored in 173 league matches.

In August 2017, she became the first Icelandic female player to join a French Division 1 Féminine club by signing a year contract to play for Olympique de Marseille.

On 27 June 2018, Fanndís signed with Úrvalsdeild kvenna club Valur. In September 2018, she was loaned to Adelaide United of the Australian W-League. She scored 2 goals in 11 matches for the club, witch finished 6th in the league, 1 point out of the playoffs.

On 12 December 2025, she announced her retirement from football.

== International career ==
Fanndís has represented Iceland since 2005, initially at the under 17 team, progressing to the under 19 and eventually arriving at the senior team in 2009, making her senior international debut on 9 March 2009 in a 2–0 defeat by Denmark at the 2009 Algarve Cup.

A few months later she was called up to be part of Iceland squad at the UEFA Women's Euro 2009, where she made two brief substitute appearances as Iceland were eliminated in the first round.

She played matches at the 2011 FIFA Women's World Cup qualification, 2010 Algarve Cup, 2011 Algarve Cup and UEFA Women's Euro 2013 qualification before scoring her first goal for Iceland on 5 March 2012 in a 1–0 win over China at the 2012 Algarve Cup. Her second goal came on 15 September 2012 at a UEFA Women's Euro 2013 qualification 2–0 win over Northern Ireland.

After playing the 2013 Algarve Cup and friendly matches, national team coach Siggi Eyjólfsson selected Fanndís in the Iceland squad for the UEFA Women's Euro 2013. She started three out of the four matches Iceland played in the tournament, including the Quarterfinal 4–0 defeat by Sweden.

Fanndís scored her third goal on 10 March 2014 in a 1–0 win over China at the 2014 Algarve Cup. Her fourth and fifth goals came during the 2015 FIFA Women's World Cup qualification, the fourth on 10 April 2014 in an 8–0 win over Malta and the fifth on 13 September 2014 in a 3–0 win over Israel.

After playing the 2015 Algarve Cup and 2016 Algarve Cup, Fanndís scored again during the UEFA Women's Euro 2017 qualification matches, with her first brace (two goals in one match) for Iceland on 7 June 2016 in an 8–0 win over Macedonia and one more goal came on 20 September 2016 in a 2–1 defeat by Scotland, taking her tally to eight goals. Her ninth and tenth were scored at the 2016 Sincere Cup, on 20 October 2016 in a 2–2 draw with China and on 24 October 2016 in a 1–0 win over Uzbekistan.

She took part at the 2017 Algarve Cup and played in some friendly matches before national coach Freyr Alexandersson selected her to the national team for the UEFA Women's Euro 2017. Fanndís started all three matches Iceland played in the tournament, scoring the country's only goal in the tournament and her 11th goal for Iceland, on 22 July 2017 in a 2–1 defeat by Switzerland.

Fanndís scored her second brace for the national team during Iceland opening match of the 2019 FIFA Women's World Cup qualification on 18 September 2017 in an 8–0 win over Faroe Islands, it took her tally to 13 goals.

== International goals ==
No.	Date	Venue	Opponent	Score	Result	Competition
1.	5 March 2012	Lagos, Portugal	China	1–0	1–0	2012 Algarve Cup
2.	15 September 2012	Reykjavík, Iceland	Northern Ireland	2–0	2–0	UEFA Women's Euro 2013 qualifying
3.	10 March 2014	Lagos, Portugal	China	1–0	1–0	2014 Algarve Cup
4.	10 April 2014	Ta'Qali, Malta	Malta	6–0	8–0	2015 FIFA Women's World Cup qualification
5.	13 September 2014	Reykjavík, Iceland	Israel	2–0	3–0	2015 FIFA Women's World Cup qualification
6.	7 June 2016	Reykjavík, Iceland	North Macedonia	1–0	8–0	UEFA Women's Euro 2017 qualifying
7.	7 June 2016	Reykjavík, Iceland	North Macedonia	7–0	8–0	UEFA Women's Euro 2017 qualifying
8.	20 September 2016	Reykjavík, Iceland	Scotland	1–1	1–2	UEFA Women's Euro 2017 qualifying
9.	20 October 2016	Chongqing, China	China	1–0	2–2	2016 Yongchuan International Tournament
10.	24 October 2016	Chongqing, China	Uzbekistan	1–0	1–0	2016 Yongchuan International Tournament
11.	22 July 2017	Doetinchem, Netherlands	Switzerland	1–0	1–2	UEFA Women's Euro 2017
12.	18 September 2017	Reykjavík, Iceland	Faroe Islands	6–0	8–0	2019 FIFA Women's World Cup qualification
13.	18 September 2017	Reykjavík, Iceland	Faroe Islands	8–0	8–0	2019 FIFA Women's World Cup qualification
14.	10 April 2018	Tórshavn, Faroe Islands	Faroe Islands	5–0	5–0	2019 FIFA Women's World Cup qualification
15.	8 October 2019	Liepāja, Latvia	Latvia	1–0	6–0	UEFA Women's Euro 2022 qualifying
16.	8 October 2019	Liepāja, Latvia	Latvia	3–0	6–0	UEFA Women's Euro 2022 qualifying

== Personal life ==
Fanndís's father is former Iceland men's national football team goalkeeper Friðrik Friðriksson and her mother is former Olympic alpine skier Nanna Leifsdóttir.

== Honours ==
- Úrvalsdeild kvenna: Winner 2005, 2015, 2019
- Icelandic Women's Cup: Winner 2005, 2016
- Most Promising Player in Breiðablik in 2008
- Úrvalsdeild kvenna Player of the year in 2015
