= Norma Andrews =

American cell biologist and academic

Norma W. Andrews is a cell biologist and professor at the University of Maryland Department of Cell Biology and Molecular Genetics. She chaired the department from 2009 to 2014.

== Education and career ==
Norma Andrews received her B.S. in 1977 and Ph.D. in 1983, both from the University of São Paulo. She then went on to a postdoctoral fellowship in the laboratory of Victor Nussenzweig at New York University, which she completed in 1990. She then began her own laboratory at Yale University, where she joined the Department of Cell Biology and the Section of Microbial Pathogenesis becoming a Full Professor in 1999. In 2009, Andrews moved her lab to the University of Maryland to chair the Department of Cell Biology and Molecular Genetics. She stepped down from that position in 2014.

== Research ==
Andrews' research has focused on the cell biology of mammalian cells and their response to intracellular parasitic eukaryotes such as Trypanosoma cruzi and Leishmania. Her group is known for discovering and characterizing calcium-dependent exocytosis of lysosomes in mammalian cells, and its role in repair of the plasma membrane.

== Notable publications ==
- Idone V, Tam C... Andrews NW (2008). Repair of injured plasma membrane by rapid Ca^{2+} dependent endocytosis. Journal of Cell Biology. 180(5): pgs. 905-914
- Reddy A, Caler EV, Andrews NW (2001). Plasma membrane repair is mediated by Ca^{2+}-regulated exocytosis of lysosomes. Cell. 106(2): pgs. 157-169
- Martinez I, Chakrabarti S... Andrews NW (2000). Synaptotagmin vii regulated Ca^{2+}-dependent exocytosis of lysosomes in fibroblasts. Journal of Cell Biology. 148(6): pgs. 1141-1149
- Rodriguez A, Webster P... Andrews NW (1997). Lysosomes behave as Ca^{2+}-regulated exocytic vesicles in fibroblasts and epithelial cells. Journal of Cell Biology. 137(1): pgs. 93-104
- Tardieux I, Webster P... Andrews NW (1992). Lysosome recruitment and fusion are early events required for trypanosome invasion of mammalian cells. Cell. 71(7): pgs. 1117-1130
- Tam C, Idone V... Andrews NW (2010). Exocytosis of acid sphingomyelinase by wounded cells promotes endocytosis and plasma membrane repair. Journal of Cell Biology. 189(6): pgs. 1027-1038
