= Perrine Pelen =

French alpine skier

Personal information
- Born: 3 July 1960 (age 66) Boulogne-Billancourt, Hauts-de-Seine, France
- Height: 1.68 m (5 ft 6 in)

Skiing career
- Sport: Alpine skiing
- Club: Grenoble University
- Retired: March 1986 (age 25)
- Disciplines: Slalom, giant slalom, combined
- World Cup debut: 9 December 1976 (age 16)

Olympics
- Teams: 2 – (1980, 1984)
- Medals: 3 (0 gold)

World Championships
- Teams: 4 – (1978–1985) includes 1980 Olympics
- Medals: 3 (1 gold)

World Cup
- Seasons: 10 – (1977–1986)
- Wins: 15 – (15 SL)
- Podiums: 43 – (36 SL, 7 GS)
- Overall titles: 0 – (4th in 1980)
- Discipline titles: 1 – (SL, 1980)
Medal record
Women's alpine skiing
Representing France
Olympic Games
Silver medal – second place	1984 Sarajevo	Slalom
Bronze medal – third place	1980 Lake Placid	Giant slalom
Bronze medal – third place	1984 Sarajevo	Giant slalom
World Championships
Gold medal – first place	1985 Bormio	Slalom
Silver medal – second place	1982 Schladming	Combined

Perrine Marie Pelen (born 3 July 1960) is a former World Cup alpine ski racer from France. Born at Boulogne-Billancourt near Paris, she made her World Cup debut at age 16 in December 1976 and won three slalom races that 1977 season.

Pelen won the bronze medal at the 1980 Winter Olympics in giant slalom; in 1984, she won the silver medal in slalom and another bronze in giant slalom. At the World Championships, she won the silver medal in combined in 1982 and the gold in slalom in 1985.

Pelen won fifteen World Cup races and the season title in the slalom in the 1980. She was runner-up in the slalom standings in 1977 and 1978, and took third in 1981, 1984, 1985, and 1986.

After ten seasons on the World Cup circuit, Pelen retired from competition following the 1986 season.

Perrine Pelen graduated from HEC Paris in 1988.

== World Cup results ==
=== Season titles ===
Season	Discipline
1980	Slalom

=== Season standings ===
Season	Age	Overall	Slalom	Giant Slalom	Super G	Downhill	Combined
1977	16	7	2	12	not run	—	not awarded
1978	17	6	2	11	not run	—	not awarded
1979	18	9	4	13	not run	—	not awarded
1980	19	4	1	2	not run	—	14
1981	20	6	3	9	not run	—	8
1982	21	8	5	6	not run	—	14
1983	22	16	11	16	not awarded (w/ GS)	—	—
1984	23	10	3	9	not awarded (w/ GS)	—	—
1985	24	12	3	19	not awarded (w/ GS)	—	—
1986	25	13	3	12	—	—	22

=== Individual races ===
- 15 wins – (15 SL)
- 43 podiums – (7 GS, 36 SL)

Season	Date	Location	Discipline
1977	26 Jan 1977	Crans-Montana, Switzerland	Slalom
1977	28 Jan 1977	Saint-Gervais, France	Slalom
1977	5 Mar 1977	(United States) Sun Valley, USA	Slalom
1978	10 Dec 1977	Cervinia, Italy	Slalom
1978	8 Feb 1978	Saint-Gervais, France	Slalom
1978	5 Mar 1978	(United States) Stratton Mountain, USA	Slalom
1979	18 Mar 1979	Furano, Japan	Slalom
1980	9 Jan 1980	Berchtesgaden, West Germany	Slalom
1980	25 Jan 1980	Saint-Gervais, France	Slalom
1980	29 Feb 1980	(United States) Waterville Valley, USA	Slalom
1980	8 Mar 1980	(Czech Republic) Vysoké Tatry, Czechoslovakia	Slalom
1981	18 Dec 1980	Altenmarkt, Austria	Slalom
1981	21 Dec 1980	Bormio, Italy	Slalom
1984	14 Jan 1984	Badgastein, Austria	Slalom
1985	1 Dec 1984	Courmayeur, Italy	Slalom

== World Championship results ==
Year	Age	Slalom	Giant Slalom	Super-G	Downhill	Combined
1978	17	4	8	not run	—	—
1980	19	DNF2	3	not run	—	—
1982	21	—	DNF	not run	—	2
1985	24	1	—	not run	—	—

From 1948 through 1980, the Winter Olympics were also the World Championships for alpine skiing.
At the World Championships from 1954 through 1980, the combined was a "paper race" using the results of the three events (DH, GS, SL).

== Olympic results ==
Year	Age	Slalom	Giant Slalom	Super-G	Downhill	Combined
1980	19	DNF2	3	not run	—	not run
1984	23	2	3	not run	—	not run
