= Marco Zanon (biathlete) =

Italian biathlete (born 1956)

Personal information
- Nationality: Italian
- Born: 6 May 1956 (age 68); Ziano di Fiemme, Italy

Sport
- Sport: Biathlon

Marco Zanon (born 6 May 1956) is an Italian biathlete. He competed in the 20 km individual event at the 1984 Winter Olympics.
