= Enrique de Ridder =

Argentine alpine skier (born 1958)

Personal information
- Born: 21 February 1958 (age 67); Buenos Aires, Argentina

Sport
- Sport: Alpine skiing

Enrique de Ridder (born 21 February 1958) is an Argentine alpine skier. He competed in two events at the 1984 Winter Olympics.
