= Emiliano Morlans =

Spanish cross-country skier (born 1952)

Personal information
- Nationality: Spanish
- Born: 11 September 1952 (age 72)

Sport
- Sport: Cross-country skiing

Emiliano Morlans (born 11 September 1952) is a Spanish cross-country skier. He competed in the men's 15 kilometre event at the 1980 Winter Olympics.
