= Magdalena Saint Antonin =

Argentine alpine skier (born 1965)

Personal information
- Born: 8 July 1965 (age 59); San Carlos de Bariloche, Argentina

Sport
- Sport: Alpine skiing

Magdalena Saint Antonin (born 8 July 1965) is an Argentine alpine skier. She competed in the women's slalom at the 1984 Winter Olympics.
