= László Palácsik =

Hungarian biathlete (1959–2022)

Personal information
- Nationality: Hungarian
- Born: 22 May 1959; Miskolc, Hungary
- Died: 27 January 2022 (aged 62)

Sport
- Sport: Biathlon

László Palácsik (22 May 1959 – 27 January 2022) was a Hungarian biathlete. He competed in the 20 km individual event at the 1984 Winter Olympics.

Palácsik died from heart disease on 27 January 2022, at the age of 62.
