= Dângeni =

- Commune
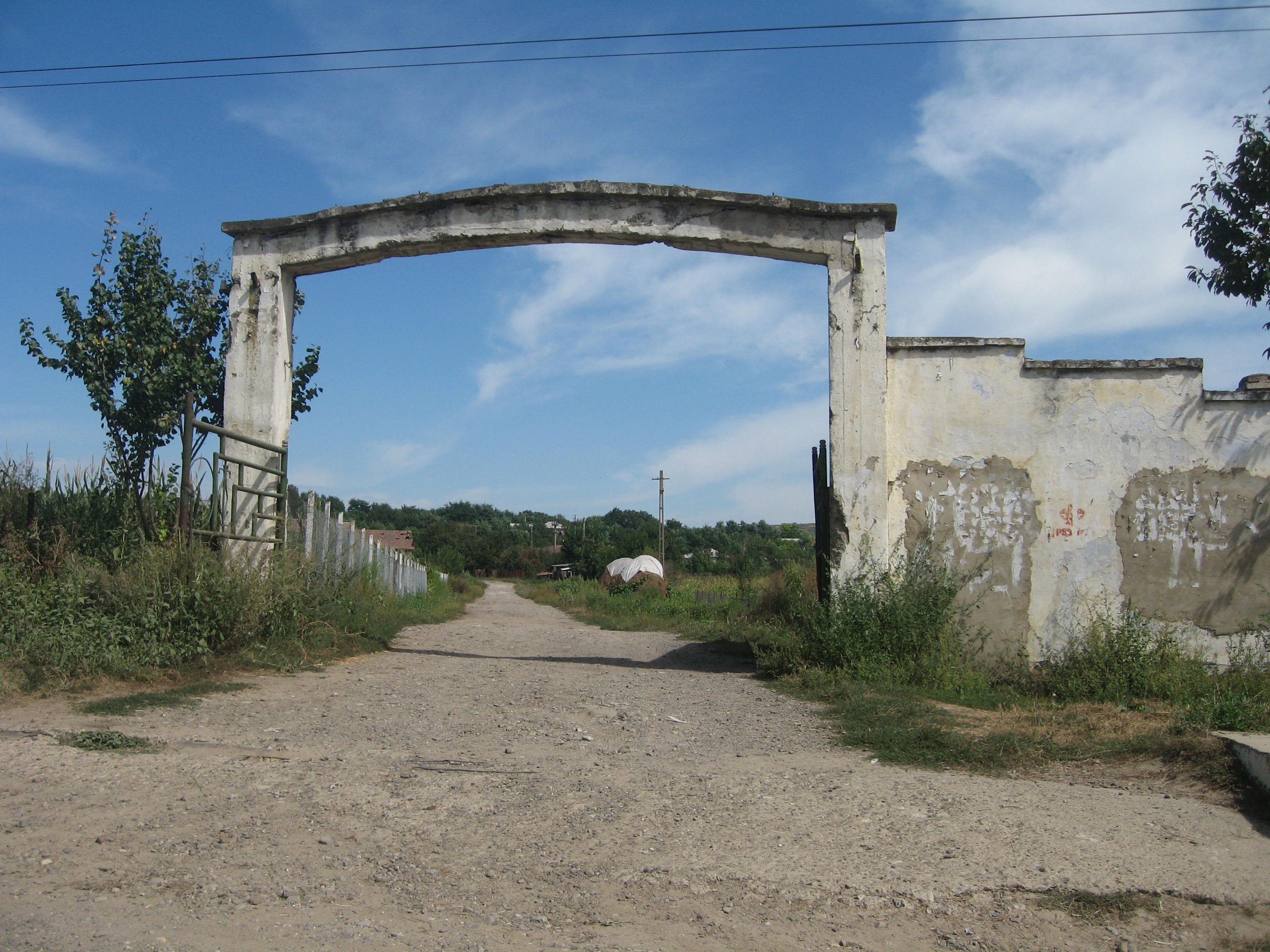

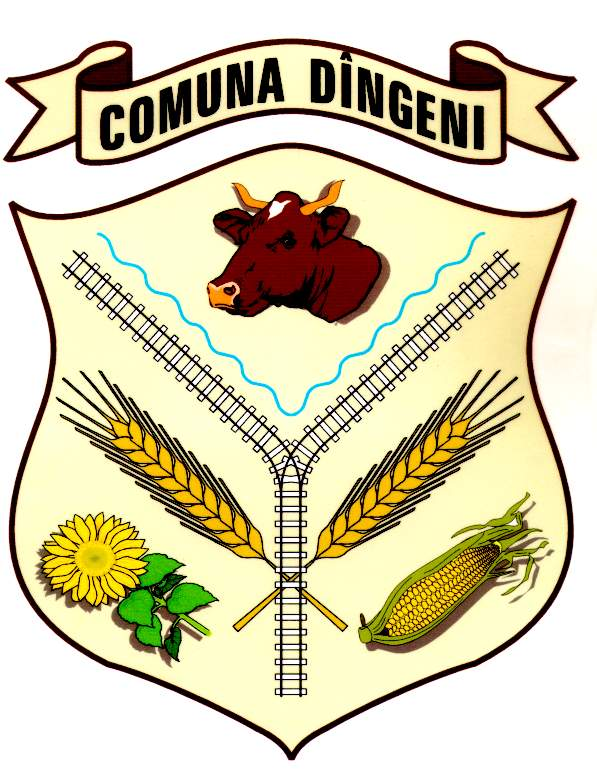
- Coat of arms

- Location in Botoșani County

- Location in Romania
- Coordinates: 47°51′N 26°58′E
- Country: Romania
- County: Botoșani
- Subdivisions: Dângeni, Hulub, Iacobeni, Strahotin

Government
  - Mayor (2024–2028): Claudiu Ilaș (PSD)
- Area: 83.35 km^{2} (32.18 sq mi)
- Elevation: 100 m (330 ft)
- Population (2021-12-01): 3,053
  - Density: 36.63/km^{2} (94.87/sq mi)
- Time zone: UTC+02:00 (EET)
  - Summer (DST): UTC+03:00 (EEST)
- Postal code: 717120
- Area code: +40 x31
- Vehicle reg.: BT
- Website: primariadingeni.ro

Dângeni is a commune in Botoșani County, Western Moldavia, Romania. It is composed of four villages: Dângeni, Hulub, Iacobeni and Strahotin.

== Natives ==
- Gheorghe Berdar
- Petre Hârtopeanu
