= Mihai Rădulescu (biathlete) =

Romanian biathlete (born 1962)

Personal information
- Nationality: Romanian
- Born: 24 July 1962 (age 62); Vatra Dornei, Romania

Sport
- Sport: Biathlon

Mihai Rădulescu (born 24 July 1962) is a Romanian biathlete. He competed in the 20 km individual event at the 1984 Winter Olympics.
