= Américo Astete =

Argentine alpine skier (born 1967)

Personal information
- Full name: Américo Daniel Astete
- Nickname: Quito Astete
- Born: 3 May 1967 Buenos Aires, Argentina
- Died: February 2, 1996 (aged 28) near Aviador Carlos Campos Airport, Neuquén Province, Argentina

Sport
- Sport: Alpine skiing

Américo Daniel Astete (3 May 1967 – 2 February 1996) was an Argentine alpine skier. He competed in two events at the 1984 Winter Olympics.

Astete died on 2 February 1996, when the Cessna 180 he was travelling on crashed shortly after taking off from Aviador Carlos Campos Airport, killing all four occupants on board, including Astete.
