= Tibor Kopacz =

Romanian speed skater

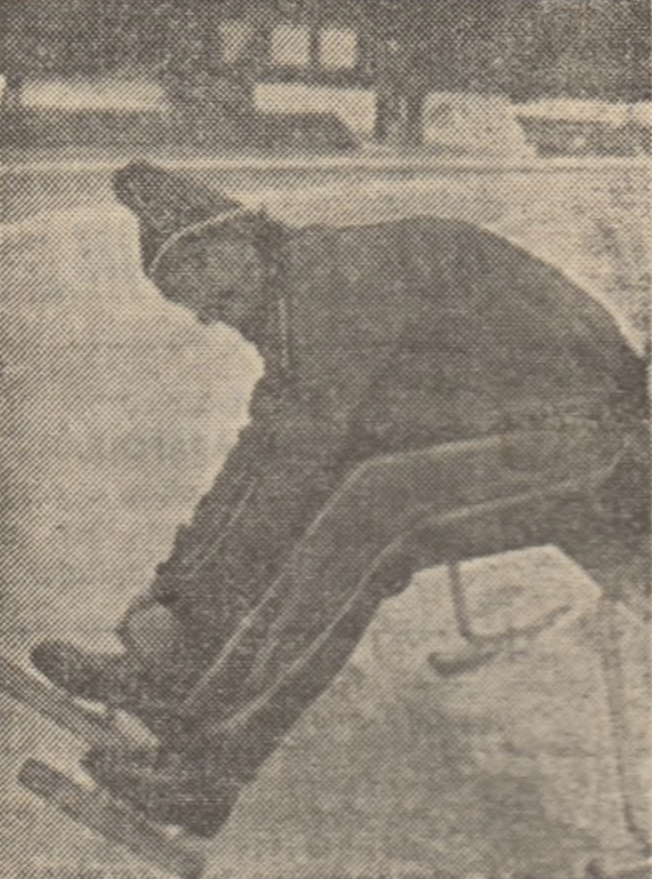
- Tibor Kopacz in 1983.

Personal information
- Nationality: Romanian
- Born: 17 April 1962 Miercurea Ciuc, Romania
- Died: 9 May 2009 (aged 47)

Sport
- Sport: Speed skating

Tibor Kopacz (17 April 1962 – 9 May 2009) was a Romanian speed skater. He competed in three events at the 1984 Winter Olympics.
