= Kirstin Cairns =

British alpine skier (born 1963)

Kirstin Cairns (born 11 January 1963 in Isle of Bute) is a British former alpine skier who competed in the 1980 Winter Olympics and in the 1988 Winter Olympics.
