= János Spisák =

Hungarian biathlete (born 1961)

Personal information
- Nationality: Hungarian
- Born: 23 September 1961 (age 63); Miskolc, Hungary

Sport
- Sport: Biathlon

János Spisák (born 23 September 1961) is a Hungarian biathlete. He competed in the 20 km individual event at the 1984 Winter Olympics.
