= Geraldina Bobbio =

Argentine alpine skier (born 1967)

Personal information
- Born: 20 August 1967 (age 57); Buenos Aires, Argentina

Sport
- Sport: Alpine skiing

Geraldina Bobbio (born 20 August 1967) is an Argentine alpine skier. She competed in the women's giant slalom at the 1984 Winter Olympics.
