= Ana Rodriguez (scientist) =

- Education: Universidad Autonoma de Madrid
- Scientific career
- Fields: Parasitology; Immunology
- Workplaces: New York University School of Medicine
- Academic advisors: Norma Andrews; Sebastian Amigorena
- Website: https://med.nyu.edu/research/rodriguez-lab/

Ana Rodriguez is a parasitologist and Professor in the Department of Microbiology at New York University School of Medicine. Her research focuses on Plasmodium falciparum and Trypanosoma cruzi and she is known for her work on Plasmodium liver infection, Plasmodium immunity, and T. cruzi drug development.

== Education and career ==
Ana Rodriguez received her Ph.D. in immunology from Universidad Autonoma de Madrid in 1993. She then went on to do postdoctoral fellowships with Norma Andrews at Yale University School of Medicine from 1993 to 1997, and Sebastian Amigorena at the Institut Curie from 1997 to 1999.

In 1999, Rodriguez was hired as an instructor at the New York University School of Medicine. She was promoted to assistant professor in 2000 and associate professor in 2010. She is currently the director of the Parasitology Division of the Department of Microbiology, as well as the director of the university's Insectary Core Facility.

== Awards ==
- 2006: Pathogenesis of Infectious Disease Award, Burroughs Wellcome Fund

== Notable work ==
- Ocana-Morgner C, Mota MM, Rodriguez A (2003). Malaria blood stage suppression of liver stage immunity by dendritic cells. Journal of Experimental Medicine. 197(2):143-151.
- Mota MM... Rodriguez A (2002). Migration through host cells activates Plasmodium sporozoites for infection. Nature Medicine. 8(11):1318-1322.
- Mota MM... Rodriguez A (2001). Migration of Plasmodium sporozoites through cells before infection. Science. 291(5501):141-144.
