= Vladimir Todașcă =

Romanian biathlete (born 1957)

Personal information
- Nationality: Romanian
- Born: 25 June 1957 (age 67); Dorna Candrenilor, Suceava County, Romania

Sport
- Sport: Biathlon

Vladimir Todașcă (born 25 June 1957) is a Romanian biathlete. He competed in the 20 km individual event at the 1984 Winter Olympics.
