= József Lihi =

Hungarian biathlete (born 1963)

Personal information
- Nationality: Hungarian
- Born: 12 March 1963 (age 62); Miskolc, Hungary

Sport
- Sport: Biathlon

József Lihi (born 12 March 1963) is a Hungarian biathlete. He competed in the 10 km sprint event at the 1984 Winter Olympics.
