= Colleen Bolton =

Australian cross-country skier (born 1957)

Personal information
- Nationality: Australian
- Born: 19 March 1957 (age 68)

Sport
- Sport: Cross-country skiing

Colleen Bolton (born 19 March 1957) is an Australian cross-country skier. She competed in two events at the 1980 Winter Olympics.
