= Marjan Vidmar =

Slovenian biathlete (born 1960)

Personal information
- Nationality: Slovenian
- Born: 1 July 1960 (age 64); Ljubljana, Yugoslavia

Sport
- Sport: Biathlon

Marjan Vidmar (born 1 July 1960) is a Slovenian biathlete. He competed in the 20 km individual event at the 1984 Winter Olympics.
