= Gheorghe Berdar =

Romanian biathlete (born 1961)

Personal information
- Nationality: Romanian
- Born: 26 March 1961 (age 64); Dângeni, Romania

Sport
- Sport: Biathlon

Gheorghe Berdar (born 26 March 1961) is a Romanian biathlete. He competed in the 10 km sprint event at the 1984 Winter Olympics.
