= Norberto von Baumann =

Argentine cross-country skier (born 1964)

Personal information
- Born: 27 November 1964 (age 60); Bariloche, Argentina

Sport
- Sport: Cross-country skiing

Norberto von Baumann (born 27 November 1964) is an Argentine cross-country skier. He competed in the men's 15 kilometre event at the 1984 Winter Olympics.
