= Oscar di Lovera =

Argentine biathlete (born 1958)

Personal information
- Born: 12 October 1958 (age 66); Esquel, Argentina

Sport
- Sport: Biathlon

Oscar di Lovera (born 12 October 1958) is an Argentine biathlete. He competed in the 10 km sprint event at the 1984 Winter Olympics.
