= Dolores Fernández Ochoa =

Spanish alpine skier (born 1966)

Dolores Fernández Ochoa (born 16 November 1966) is a Spanish former alpine skier who competed in the 1984 Winter Olympics in the disciplines slalom and giant slalom.
