= Imre Lestyan =

Romanian biathlete (born 1963)

Personal information
- Nationality: Romanian
- Born: 24 October 1963 (age 61); Târgu Mureș, Romania

Sport
- Sport: Biathlon

Imre Lestyan (born 24 October 1963) is a Romanian biathlete. He competed in the 20 km individual event at the 1984 Winter Olympics.
