= Víctor Figueroa (biathlete) =

Argentine biathlete (born 1956)

Personal information
- Born: 29 August 1956 (age 68); Mendoza, Argentina

Sport
- Sport: Biathlon

Víctor Figueroa (born 29 August 1956) is an Argentine biathlete. He competed in the 20 km individual event at the 1984 Winter Olympics.
