= Andrea Bédard =

Canadian alpine skier (born 1963)

Andrea Bédard (born 28 January 1963) is a Canadian former alpine skier who competed in the 1984 Winter Olympics.
