= Anna-Karin Hesse =

Swedish alpine skier (1961–1983)

- Born: 1 August 1961; Härnösand, Sweden
- Died: 14 July 1983 (aged 21)
- Occupation: Alpine Skier

Anna-Karin Hesse (1 August 1961 – 14 July 1983) was a Swedish alpine skier who competed in the 1980 Winter Olympics.
