= Suseni, Harghita =

Suseni Gyergyóújfalu
- Commune
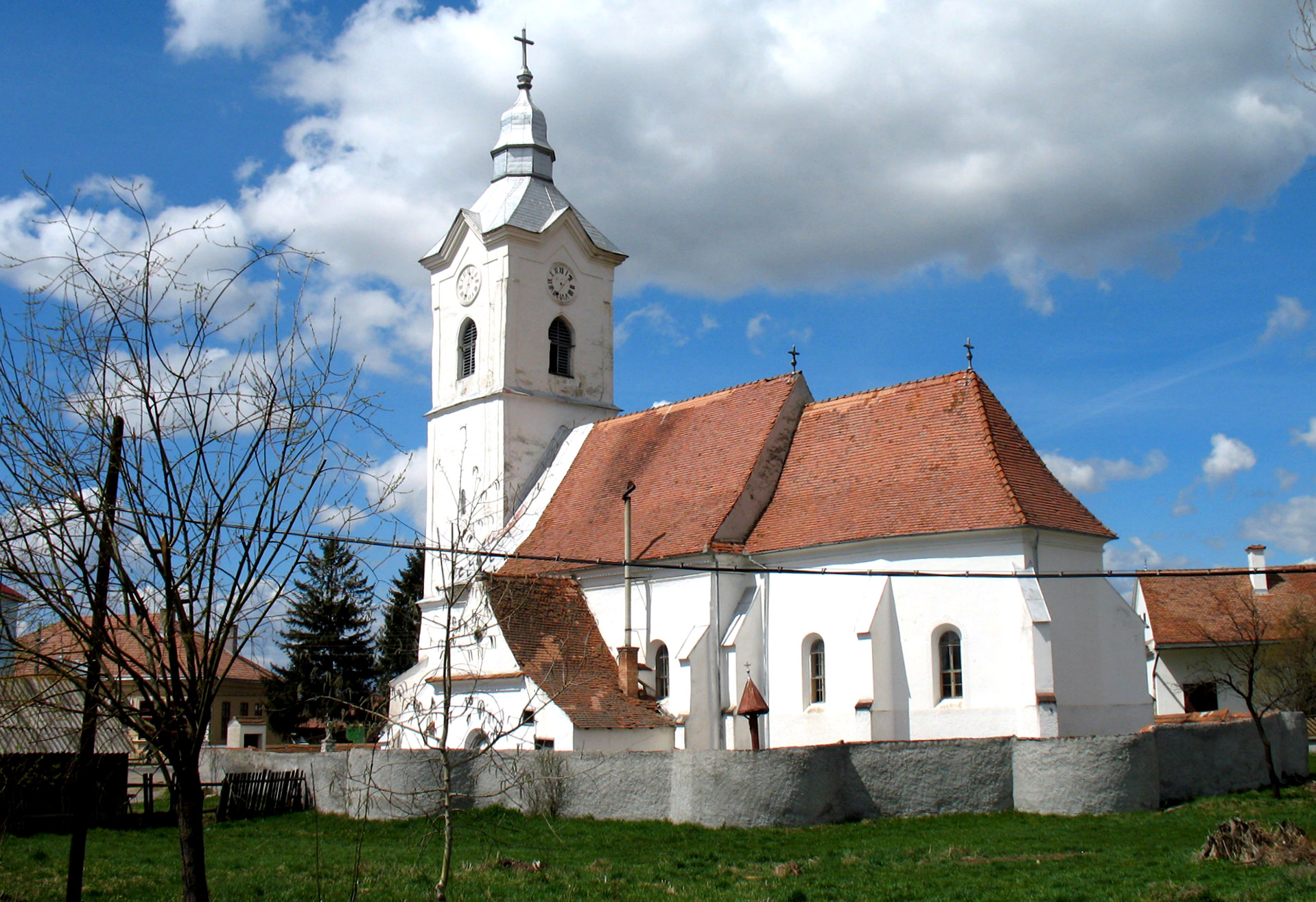
- Saint John's Roman Catholic church in Valea Strâmbă

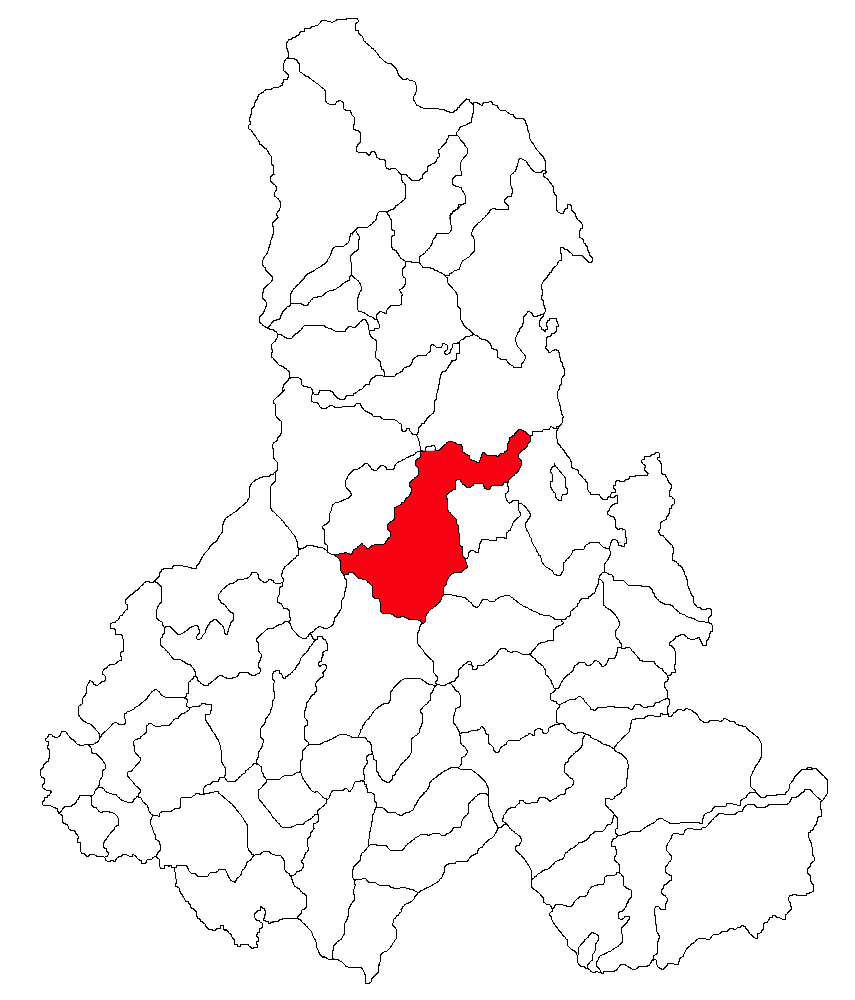
- Location in Harghita County

- Location in Romania
- Coordinates: 46°40′N 25°33′E
- Country: Romania
- County: Harghita

Government
  - Mayor (2020–2024): József Egyed (AMT)
- Area: 220.92 km^{2} (85.30 sq mi)
- Elevation: 746 m (2,448 ft)
- Population (2021-12-01): 4,944
  - Density: 22.38/km^{2} (57.96/sq mi)
- Time zone: UTC+02:00 (EET)
  - Summer (DST): UTC+03:00 (EEST)
- Postal code: 537305
- Area code: +(40) 266
- Vehicle reg.: HR
- Website: www.gyergyoujfalu.ro

Suseni (Hungarian: Gyergyóújfalu, Hungarian pronunciation: [ˈɟɛrɟoːuːjfɒlu]) is a commune in Harghita County, Romania. It lies in the Székely Land, an ethno-cultural region in eastern Transylvania. It is composed of five villages: Chileni (Kilyénfalva), Liban (Libántelep), Senetea (Szenete), Suseni, and Valea Strâmbă (Tekerőpatak).

The commune is situated in the foothills of the Harghita Mountains, at an altitude of 746 m (2,448 ft). It is located in the central part of the county, just south of Gheorgheni, and 46 km (29 mi) northwest of the county seat, Miercurea Ciuc.

== History ==
The villages were part of the Székely Land region of the historical Transylvania region. They belonged to Gyergyószék area until the administrative reform of Transylvania in 1876, when they fell within the Gyergyószentmiklós district of Csík County in the Kingdom of Hungary. Between 1762 and 1851, the village provided recruits for the 9th Company of the First Székely Infantry Regiment. In the aftermath of World War I and the Hungarian–Romanian War of 1918–1919, it passed under Romanian administration; after the Treaty of Trianon of 1920, like the rest of Transylvania, it became part of the Kingdom of Romania. During the interwar period, Suseni fell within plasa Gheorgheni in Ciuc County. In 1940, the Second Vienna Award granted Northern Transylvania to Hungary and the commune was held by Hungary until September 1944. The territory of Northern Transylvania remained under Soviet military administration until March 9, 1945, after which it became again part of Romania. Between 1952 and 1960, Suseni fell within the Magyar Autonomous Region, between 1960 and 1968 the Mureș-Magyar Autonomous Region. In 1968, Romania administration was organized in 42 counties, and since then, the commune has been part of Harghita County.

== Demographics ==
The commune has an absolute Székely Hungarian majority. According to the 2002 census, it had a population of 5,152 of which 97.44% or 5,020 were Hungarians. At the 2011 census, there were 5,114 inhabitants; of those, 94.6% were Hungarians, 2.39% Roma, and 1.17% Romanians. At the 2021 census, Suseni had a population of 4,944, of which 90.8% were Hungarians, 4.65% Roma, and 1.38% Romanians.

== Natives ==
- Janka Boga (1886 – 1963), writer and teacher
- Francisc Forika (born 1954), biathlete
- Bogdan Olarson (born 1994), dance and media artist, choreographer
- Gheorghe Vilmoș (1941 – 2001), biathlete
