= Steinunn Sæmundsdóttir =

Icelandic alpine skier (born 1960)

Personal information
- Born: 28 November 1960; Reykjavík, Iceland

Sport
- Sport: Alpine Skiing

Steinunn Sæmundsdóttir (born 28 November 1960) is a former Icelandic female alpine skier. She competed at the 1976 as well as in the 1980 Winter Olympics representing Iceland.
