= Nanna Leifsdóttir =

Icelandic alpine skier (born 1963)

Nanna Herborg Leifsdóttir (born 2 June 1963 in Akureyri) is an Icelandic former alpine skier.

She competed at the 1984 Winter Olympics in Sarajevo, coming 38th in the giant slalom with a time of 2:34:84 but failing to finish the slalom. She was the youngest member of Iceland's team and carried the flag at the opening ceremony.

Nanna Herborg's husband is former Iceland men's national football team goalkeeper Friðrik Friðriksson and their daughter is Iceland women's national football team player Fanndís Friðriksdóttir.
