= Ana María Rodríguez (writer) =

American writer

Ana María Rodríguez (born February 27, 1958) is a South American children's author specializing in science and health. Her book Edward Jenner: Conqueror of Smallpox was selected for the 2006 Best Books list of Science Books & Films, a publication of the American Association for the Advancement of Science. She sometimes writes under the pen name Mariana Relós.

== Early life and education ==
Rodríguez was born on February 27, 1958, in Buenos Aires, Argentina, and grew up in Caracas, Venezuela. She was awarded a bachelor's degree in biology from Simón Bolívar University in 1979, a master's degree in biology from the Venezuelan Institute for Scientific Research in 1982, and a Ph.D. in biology and immunology from the Venezuelan Institute for Scientific Research. After relocating in 1987 to the United States, Rodríguez completed postdoctoral studies at University of Texas Southwestern Medical Center at Dallas and University of Texas Medical Branch in Galveston, Texas.

== Career ==
After completing her education, Rodríguez taught graduate and undergraduate students and also volunteered in the Boston Museum of Science's SCIENCE-BY-MAIL program for children. In 1995, she began taking correspondence courses on writing for children from the Connecticut Institute of Children's Literature. She completed her second course in 1999, the same year she dedicated herself to writing full-time. Rodríguez's first article, "The Kids Who Fought Smallpox", was published in the May 2000 issue of Highlights for Children under her pen name Mariana Relós and won the Highlights History Feature of the Year Award.

In 2001, Rodríguez completed a third course at the Institute of Children's Literature, and in 2003 became part of the school's faculty. That same year, she published her first book for children, Fires.

=== Personal life ===
Rodríguez lives with her husband and two sons in Houston, Texas.

== Published works ==
- Fires (Lucent Press, 2003)
- Fires (Greenhaven Press, 2004)
- Edward Jenner : Conqueror of Smallpox (Enslow Publishers, 2006)
- A Day in the Life of the Brain (Chelsea House, 2007)
- Bicycles : Math in Motion (Pearson Learning, 2007)
- Get Fit! (Pearson Learning, 2007)
- Autism and Asperger syndrome (Enslow Publishers, 2009)
- Secret of the sleepless whales... and more! Animal Secrets Revealed! series. (Enslow Publishers, 2009)
- Secret of the bloody hippo... and more! Animal Secrets Revealed! series. (Enslow Publishers, 2009)
- Secret of the puking penguins... and more! Animal Secrets Revealed! series. (Enslow Publishers, 2009)
- Secret of the suffocating slime trap... and more! Animal Secrets Revealed! series. (Enslow Publishers, 2009)
- Secret of the plant-killing ants... and more! Animal Secrets Revealed! series. Animal Secrets Revealed! series. (Enslow Publishers, 2009)
- Secret of the singing mice... and more! (Enslow Publishers, 2009)

== Awards ==
Highlights History Feature of the Year – Highlights for Children
2000 "The Kids Who Fought Smallpox"

Best Books List – Science Books & Films
2006 Edward Jenner: Conqueror of Smallpox
2007 A Day in the Life of the Brain
