= Brigitte Nansoz =

Swiss alpine skier (born 1962)

Brigitte Nansoz (born 20 August 1962 in Evionnaz) is a Swiss retired alpine skier who competed in the 1980 Winter Olympics.
