= Francisc Forika =

Romanian biathlete (born 1954)

Personal information
- Nationality: Romanian
- Born: 6 June 1954 (age 70); Valea Strâmbă, Magyar Autonomous Region, Romanian People's Republic

Sport
- Sport: Biathlon

Francisc Forika (born 16 June 1954) is a Romanian biathlete. He competed in the 10 km sprint event at the 1984 Winter Olympics.
