= Ewa Grabowska =

Polish alpine skier (born 1962)

Ewa Grabowska-Gaczorek (born 8 September 1962 in Nowy Targ) is a Polish former alpine skier.

Competing in the 1983 Alpine Skiing World Cup, she notably placed 8th in the February 1983 slalom race in Maribor. She repeated the same placement in December that year, in Piancavallo, and finished 9th in March 1984 in Jasná.

Competing in the 1984 Winter Olympics, she placed 13th in the women's slalom and 31st in the women's giant slalom.
