= Regina Sackl =

Austrian alpine skier

Personal information
- Born: 22 August 1959 (age 66) Hartberg, Austria

Skiing career
- Sport: Alpine skiing
- Retired: 1981
- Disciplines: Technical events
- World Cup debut: 1974

World Championships
- Teams: 2

World Cup
- Seasons: 8
- Wins: 1
- Podiums: 6
- Discipline titles: 1
Medal record
Women's alpine skiing
Representing Austria
World Cup race podiums
Event	1st	2nd	3rd
Slalom	3	0	2
Giant slalom	0	0	1
Total	3	0	3

Regina Sackl (born 22 August 1959) is an Austrian former alpine skier who won slalom World cup in 1979 Alpine Ski World Cup.

== Career ==
During her career she has achieved 6 results among the top 3 (3 victories) in the World Cup. She competed in the 1976 Winter Olympics and 1980 Winter Olympics.

== World Cup results ==
Top 10

Date	Place	Discipline	Rank
03-02-1979	(West Germany) Pfronten	Slalom	3
19-01-1979	(Switzerland) Meiringen	Slalom	1
08-01-1979	(France) Les Gets	Slalom	1
07-01-1979	(France) Les Gets	Giant slalom	3
26-02-1977	(Japan) Furano	Slalom	1
26-01-1976	(Socialist Federal Republic of Yugoslavia) Kranjska Gora	Slalom	3
