= Marina Laurencon =

French alpine skier (born 1960)

Marina Laurencon (born 10 September 1960 in Briançon) is a French former alpine skier who competed in the 1980 Winter Olympics.
