= Jenny Altermatt =

Australian alpine skier (born 1960)

Personal information
- Nationality: Australian
- Born: 5 May 1960 (age 64); Falls Creek, Victoria, Australia

Sport
- Sport: Alpine skiing

Jennifer Altermatt (born 5 May 1960) is an Australian alpine skier. She competed in two events at the 1980 Winter Olympics.
