= Gabriela Angaut =

Argentine alpine skier (born 1963)

Personal information
- Born: 14 December 1963 (age 62) Esquel, Argentina

Sport
- Sport: Alpine skiing

Gabriela Angaut (born 14 December 1963) is an Argentine alpine skier. She competed in two events at the 1984 Winter Olympics.
