= Teresa Bustamante =

Argentine alpine skier (born 1962)

Personal information
- Born: 17 November 1962 (age 62); San Carlos de Bariloche, Argentina

Sport
- Sport: Alpine skiing

Teresa Bustamante (born 17 November 1962) is an Argentine alpine skier. She competed in three events at the 1984 Winter Olympics.
