= Jacqui Cowderoy =

Australian alpine skier (born 1961)

Jacqui Cowderoy (born 29 December 1961) is a former Australian alpine skier who competed at the 1980 Winter Olympics. She came 17th out of 19 competitors in the slalom and was disqualified in the giant slalom.
