= Liliana Ichim =

Romanian alpine skier (born 1967)

Personal information
- Nationality: Romanian
- Born: 12 October 1967 (age 57); Vatra Dornei, Romania

Sport
- Sport: Alpine skiing

Liliana Ichim (born 12 October 1967) is a Romanian alpine skier. She competed in two events at the 1984 Winter Olympics.
