= Zsolt Kovács (biathlete) =

Hungarian biathlete (born 1962)

Personal information
- Nationality: Hungarian
- Born: 11 November 1962 (age 62); Budapest, Hungary

Sport
- Sport: Biathlon

Zsolt Kovács (born 11 November 1962) is a Hungarian biathlete. He competed at the 1984 Winter Olympics and the 1988 Winter Olympics.

== Biathlon results ==
All results are sourced from the International Biathlon Union.

=== Olympic Games ===
Event	Individual	Sprint	Relay
Representing Hungary
(Socialist Federal Republic of Yugoslavia) 1984 Sarajevo	45th	33rd	14th
(Canada) 1988 Calgary	54th	48th	—

=== World Championships ===
Event	Individual	Sprint	Pursuit	Mass start	Team	Relay
Representing Hungary
(Italy) 1983 Antholz-Anterselva	54th	66th	—	—	—	13th
(East Germany) 1985 Ruhpolding	45th	61st	—	—	—	12th
(Norway) 1986 Oslo	69th	—	—	—	—	16th
(Austria) 1989 Feistritz	47th	48th	—	—	17th	19th

*During Olympic seasons competitions are only held for those events not included in the Olympic program.
