= Nuša Tome =

Slovenian alpine skier (1960–2015)

Nuša Tome (19 October 1960 – November 2015) was a Slovenian former alpine skier who competed for Yugoslavia in the 1980 Winter Olympics and 1984 Winter Olympics. She also competed in the 1978 World Championships and the 1984 World Cup in Maribor, where she placed seventh in slalom. She was a board member of the Sports Foundation and the Ilirika Ski Jumping club.
