= Wang Guizhen =

Chinese skier (born 1961)

Personal information
- Full name: 王桂珍
- Nationality: Chinese
- Born: 14 January 1961 (age 64); Jilin, China

Sport
- Sport: Alpine skiing

Wang Guizhen (born 14 January 1961) is a Chinese alpine skier. She competed at the 1980 Winter Olympics and the 1984 Winter Olympics.
