= Ana María Rodríguez (alpine skier) =

Spanish alpine skier (born 1962)

Ana María Rodríguez Molina (born 2 October 1962) is a Spanish former alpine skier who competed in the 1980 Winter Olympics.
