= 1977–78 FIS Alpine Ski World Cup =

International sports competition

FIS Alpine Ski World Cup 1977/78
Discipline	Men	Women
Overall	(Sweden) Ingemar Stenmark	(Liechtenstein) Hanni Wenzel
Downhill	(Austria) Franz Klammer	(Austria) Annemarie Moser-Pröll
Giant slalom	(Sweden) Ingemar Stenmark	(Switzerland) Lise-Marie Morerod
Slalom	(Sweden) Ingemar Stenmark	(Liechtenstein) Hanni Wenzel
Nations Cup	Austria	Austria
- Nations Cup overall: Austria

Competition
Locations	15	15
Individual	22	22

The 12th World Cup season began in December 1977 and concluded in March 1978. Ingemar Stenmark of Sweden won his third consecutive overall title. Hanni Wenzel of Liechtenstein won the women's overall title.

A break in the schedule was for the 1978 World Championships, held in Garmisch-Partenkirchen, Bavaria, West Germany, between 29 January and 5 February 1978.

During this season, no combined races were included in the World Cup. Combined was resumed in the following season 1978/79. A demonstration parallel slalom race was run as the last race of the season, in Arosa, Switzerland on 19 March 1978, but it did not count in the official standings for either men or women. However, it became the model for a season-ending team parallel slalom race to be run as a part of the season-ending events.

== Calendar ==
=== Men ===
Event key: DH – Downhill, SL – Slalom, GS – Giant slalom, PS – Parallel slalom (Nations Cup ranking only)
Race	Season	Date	Place	Type	Winner	Second	Third
263	1	10 December 1977	(France) Val d'Isère	GS _{085}	(Sweden) Ingemar Stenmark	(Switzerland) Heini Hemmi	(Switzerland) Jean-Luc Fournier
264	2	11 December 1977	(France) Val d'Isère	DH _{079}	(Austria) Franz Klammer	(Italy) Herbert Plank	(Austria) Josef Walcher
265	3	13 December 1977	(Italy) Madonna di Campiglio	SL _{091}	(Sweden) Ingemar Stenmark	(Austria) Klaus Heidegger	(Socialist Federal Republic of Yugoslavia) Bojan Križaj
266	4	14 December 1977	(Italy) Madonna di Campiglio	GS _{086}	(Sweden) Ingemar Stenmark	(Switzerland) Heini Hemmi	(Liechtenstein) Andreas Wenzel
267	5	18 December 1977	(Italy) Val Gardena	DH _{080}	(Italy) Herbert Plank	(Austria) Peter Wirnsberger	(Austria) Franz Klammer
268	6	22 December 1977	(Italy) Cortina d'Ampezzo	DH _{081}	(Italy) Herbert Plank	(Switzerland) Bernhard Russi	(Austria) Peter Wirnsberger
269	7	5 January 1978	(West Germany) Oberstaufen	SL _{092}	(Sweden) Ingemar Stenmark	(Austria) Klaus Heidegger	(Italy) Piero Gros
270	8	8 January 1978	(West Germany) Zwiesel	GS _{087}	(Sweden) Ingemar Stenmark	(United States) Phil Mahre	(Liechtenstein) Andreas Wenzel
271	9	9 January 1978	(West Germany) Zwiesel	SL _{093}	(Sweden) Ingemar Stenmark	(Italy) Mauro Bernardi	(United States) Phil Mahre
272	10	15 January 1978	(Switzerland) Wengen	SL _{094}	(Austria) Klaus Heidegger	(Bulgaria) Petar Popangelov	(Italy) Mauro Bernardi
273	11	17 January 1978	(Switzerland) Adelboden	GS _{088}	(Liechtenstein) Andreas Wenzel	(Sweden) Ingemar Stenmark	(Italy) Piero Gros
274	12	20 January 1978	(Austria) Kitzbühel	DH _{082}	(Austria) Josef Walcher	(Switzerland) Walter Vesti	(Italy) Renato Antonioli
275	13	21 January 1978	(Austria) Kitzbühel	DH _{083}	(Austria) Josef Walcher (West Germany) Sepp Ferstl		(West Germany) Michael Veith
276	14	22 January 1978	(Austria) Kitzbühel	SL _{095}	(Austria) Klaus Heidegger	(Bulgaria) Petar Popangelov	(Liechtenstein) Andreas Wenzel
FIS Alpine World Ski Championships 1978 (29 January – 5 February)
277	15	11 February 1978	(France) Les Houches	DH _{084}	(Canada) Ken Read	(Canada) Dave Murray	(West Germany) Michael Veith
278	16	12 February 1978	(France) Chamonix	SL _{096}	(United States) Phil Mahre	(Sweden) Ingemar Stenmark	(Italy) Paolo De Chiesa
279	17	3 March 1978	(United States) Stratton Mountain	GS _{089}	(United States) Phil Mahre	(Switzerland) Heini Hemmi	(Sweden) Ingemar Stenmark
280	18	4 March 1978	(United States) Stratton Mountain	SL _{097}	(United States) Steve Mahre	(Sweden) Ingemar Stenmark	(Switzerland) Peter Lüscher
281	19	6 March 1978	(United States) Waterville Valley	GS _{090}	(Liechtenstein) Andreas Wenzel	(United States) Phil Mahre	(Sweden) Ingemar Stenmark
282	20	10 March 1978	(Switzerland) Laax	DH _{085}	(Austria) Uli Spieß	(Austria) Franz Klammer	(Norway) Erik Håker
283	21	11 March 1978	(Switzerland) Laax	DH _{086}	(Austria) Franz Klammer	(Norway) Erik Håker	(Austria) Uli Spieß
284	22	18 March 1978	(Switzerland) Arosa	GS _{091}	(Sweden) Ingemar Stenmark	(Liechtenstein) Andreas Wenzel	(Switzerland) Peter Lüscher
Nations Cup		19 March 1978	(Switzerland) Arosa	PS _{ncr}	(United States) Phil Mahre	(Sweden) Ingemar Stenmark	(Austria) Leonhard Stock

=== Ladies ===
Event key: DH – Downhill, SL – Slalom, GS – Giant slalom, PS – Parallel slalom (Nations Cup ranking only)
Race	Season	Date	Place	Type	Winner	Second	Third
251	1	7 December 1977	(France) Val d'Isère	DH _{069}	(Switzerland) Marie-Theres Nadig	(Austria) Annemarie Moser-Pröll	(West Germany) Monika Bader
252	2	8 December 1977	(France) Val d'Isère	GS _{082}	(Switzerland) Lise-Marie Morerod	(West Germany) Maria Epple	(Austria) Monika Kaserer
253	3	10 December 1977	(Italy) Cervinia	SL _{092}	(France) Perrine Pelen	(France) Fabienne Serrat	(Liechtenstein) Hanni Wenzel
254	4	15 December 1977	(Italy) Madonna di Campiglio	GS _{083}	(Liechtenstein) Hanni Wenzel	(Austria) Monika Kaserer	(Switzerland) Lise-Marie Morerod
255	5	6 January 1978	(West Germany) Pfronten	DH _{070}	(Austria) Annemarie Moser-Pröll	(United States) Cindy Nelson	(Switzerland) Doris de Agostini
256	6	7 January 1978	(West Germany) Pfronten	DH _{071}	(Austria) Annemarie Moser-Pröll	(United States) Cindy Nelson	(Switzerland) Marie-Theres Nadig
257	7	9 January 1978	(Switzerland) Les Mosses	GS _{084}	(Switzerland) Lise-Marie Morerod	(Liechtenstein) Hanni Wenzel	(West Germany) Maria Epple
258	8	10 January 1978	(Switzerland) Les Mosses	GS _{085}	(Liechtenstein) Hanni Wenzel	(Austria) Monika Kaserer	(France) Fabienne Serrat
259	9	13 January 1978	(Switzerland) Les Diablerets	DH _{072}	(Austria) Annemarie Moser-Pröll	(West Germany) Evi Mittermaier	(West Germany) Irene Epple
260	10	18 January 1978	(Austria) Bad Gastein	DH _{073}	(West Germany) Evi Mittermaier	(Austria) Annemarie Moser-Pröll	(Switzerland) Marie-Theres Nadig
261	11	19 January 1978	(Austria) Bad Gastein	SL _{093}	(Switzerland) Lise-Marie Morerod	(Liechtenstein) Hanni Wenzel	(France) Perrine Pelen
262	12	22 January 1978	(Socialist Federal Republic of Yugoslavia) Maribor	SL _{094}	(Liechtenstein) Hanni Wenzel	(West Germany) Maria Epple	(Austria) Lea Sölkner
263	13	24 January 1978	(West Germany) Berchtesgaden	SL _{095}	(Liechtenstein) Hanni Wenzel	(Switzerland) Lise-Marie Morerod	(France) Perrine Pelen
264	14	25 January 1978	(West Germany) Berchtesgaden	SL _{096}	(Liechtenstein) Hanni Wenzel	(France) Fabienne Serrat	(Switzerland) Lise-Marie Morerod
FIS Alpine World Ski Championships 1978 (29 January – 5 February)
265	15	8 February 1978	(France) St. Gervais	SL _{097}	(France) Perrine Pelen	(Austria) Lea Sölkner	(France) Fabienne Serrat
266	16	9 February 1978	(France) Megève	GS _{086}	(Switzerland) Lise-Marie Morerod	(Austria) Annemarie Moser-Pröll	(France) Fabienne Serrat
267	17	2 March 1978	(United States) Stratton Mountain	GS _{087}	(Liechtenstein) Hanni Wenzel	(West Germany) Maria Epple	(Switzerland) Lise-Marie Morerod
268	18	5 March 1978	(United States) Stratton Mountain	SL _{098}	(France) Perrine Pelen	(France) Fabienne Serrat	(Liechtenstein) Hanni Wenzel
269	19	7 March 1978	(United States) Waterville Valley	GS _{088}	(Switzerland) Lise-Marie Morerod	(United States) Becky Dorsey	(France) Fabienne Serrat
270	20	11 March 1978	(Austria) Bad Kleinkirchheim	DH _{074}	(Austria) Annemarie Moser-Pröll	(United States) Cindy Nelson	(West Germany) Evi Mittermaier
271	21	12 March 1978	(Austria) Bad Kleinkirchheim	DH _{075}	(Austria) Annemarie Moser-Pröll	(United States) Cindy Nelson	(Switzerland) Marie-Theres Nadig
272	22	17 March 1978	(Switzerland) Arosa	GS _{089}	(Austria) Annemarie Moser-Pröll	(West Germany) Irene Epple	(Switzerland) Lise-Marie Morerod
Nations Cup		19 March 1978	(Switzerland) Arosa	PS _{ncr}	(Austria) Annemarie Moser-Pröll	(West Germany) Christa Zechmeister	(United States) Viki Fleckenstein

== Men ==
=== Overall ===
In men's overall World Cup 1977/78 the best 3 results of each discipline count; best three downhills, best three giant slaloms and best three slaloms. The parallel slalom only counts for the Nationscup (or was a show-event). 24 racers had a point deduction. Ingemar Stenmark won his third Overall World Cup in a row.

Place	Name	Country	Total	DH	GS	SL
1	Ingemar Stenmark	Sweden	150	0	75	75
2	Phil Mahre	United States	116	0	65	51
3	Andreas Wenzel	Liechtenstein	100	0	70	30
4	Klaus Heidegger	Austria	95	0	25	70
5	Herbert Plank	Italy	70	70	0	0
	Franz Klammer	Austria	70	70	0	0
7	Josef Walcher	Austria	65	65	0	0
8	Piero Gros	Italy	60	0	23	37
	Heini Hemmi	Switzerland	60	0	60	0
10	Mauro Bernardi	Italy	54	0	11	43
11	Ken Read	Canada	47	47	0	0
12	Petar Popangelov	Bulgaria	43	0	0	43
	Uli Spieß	Austria	43	43	0	0
14	Michael Veith	West Germany	41	41	0	0
	Sepp Ferstl	West Germany	41	41	0	0

=== Downhill ===
see complete table

In men's downhill World Cup 1977/78 the best 5 results count. Four racers had a point deduction, which are given in (). For the very first time there was a shared win, when Josef Walcher and Sepp Ferstl tied in the second race at Kitzbühel. Franz Klammer won his fourth Downhill World Cup in a row.

Place	Name	Country	Total	2	5	6	12	13	15	20	21
1	Franz Klammer	Austria	96	25	15	(3)	11	(11)	-	20	25
2	Josef Walcher	Austria	74	15	3	-	25	25	6	-	(3)
3	Herbert Plank	Italy	73	20	25	25	3	-	-	-	-
4	Ken Read	Canada	56	11	-	(2)	-	3	25	6	11
5	Sepp Ferstl	West Germany	49	8	-	-	-	25	-	8	8
6	Uli Spieß	Austria	47	3	2	-	-	2	-	25	15
7	Michael Veith	West Germany	45	-	11	-	-	15	15	4	-
8	Peter Wirnsberger	Austria	43	-	20	15	4	-	4	-	-
9	Werner Grissmann	Austria	39	6	8	(4)	8	6	11	-	-
	Erik Håker	Norway	39	2	-	-	-	-	2	15	20

=== Giant slalom ===
In men's giant slalom World Cup 1977/78 the best 5 results count. Four racers had a point deduction, which are given in (). Ingemar Stenmark regained his Giant slalom World Cup title after losing the previous year on a tiebreak.

Place	Name	Country	Total	1	4	8	11	17	19	22
1	Ingemar Stenmark	Sweden	120	25	25	25	20	(15)	(15)	25
2	Andreas Wenzel	Liechtenstein	100	-	15	15	25	(2)	25	20
3	Phil Mahre	United States	84	11	(4)	20	8	25	20	(6)
4	Heini Hemmi	Switzerland	82	20	20	-	11	20	11	(11)
5	Jean-Luc Fournier	Switzerland	32	15	6	11	-	-	-	-
6	Peter Lüscher	Switzerland	30	-	1	-	4	6	4	15
7	Klaus Heidegger	Austria	27	6	11	8	2	-	-	-
8	Leonhard Stock	Austria	24	8	8	-	-	-	-	8
9	Piero Gros	Italy	23	4	-	4	15	-	-	-
10	Gustav Thöni	Italy	17	-	3	3	3	-	8	-

=== Slalom ===
In men's slalom World Cup 1977/78 the best 5 results count. Two racers had point a deduction, which are given in (). Ingemar Stenmark won his fourth Slalom World Cup in a row.

Place	Name	Country	Total	3	7	9	10	14	16	18
1	Ingemar Stenmark	Sweden	115	25	25	25	(8)	-	20	20
2	Klaus Heidegger	Austria	90	20	20	-	25	25	-	-
3	Phil Mahre	United States	66	11	11	15	-	4	25	-
4	Piero Gros	Italy	47	(1)	15	11	4	11	-	6
5	Mauro Bernardi	Italy	43	8	-	20	15	-	-	-
	Petar Popangelov	Bulgaria	43	3	-	-	20	20	-	-
7	Andreas Wenzel	Liechtenstein	30	4	-	-	-	15	-	11
8	Paolo De Chiesa	Italy	28	-	1	4	-	6	15	2
9	Steve Mahre	United States	25	-	-	-	-	-	-	25
10	Fausto Radici	Italy	22	6	4	-	11	1	-	-

== Ladies ==
=== Overall ===
In women's overall World Cup 1977/78 the best 3 results of each discipline count; best three downhills, best three giant slaloms and best three slaloms. The parallel slalom only counts for the Nationscup (or was a show-event). 17 racers had a point deduction.

Place	Name	Country	Total	DH	GS	SL
1	Hanni Wenzel	Liechtenstein	154	4	75	75
2	Annemarie Moser-Pröll	Austria	147	75	53	19
3	Lise-Marie Morerod	Switzerland	135	0	75	60
4	Fabienne Serrat	France	105	0	45	60
5	Cindy Nelson	United States	97	60	25	12
6	Perrine Pelen	France	96	0	21	75
7	Maria Epple	West Germany	94	0	55	39
8	Monika Kaserer	Austria	76	6	55	15
9	Lea Sölkner	Austria	70	0	24	46
10	Marie-Theres Nadig	Switzerland	63	55	8	0
11	Irene Epple	West Germany	62	32	30	0
12	Evi Mittermaier	West Germany	60	60	0	0
13	Becky Dorsey	United States	45	0	28	17
14	Doris de Agostini	Switzerland	37	37	0	0
15	Abbi Fisher	United States	27	0	9	18
	Irmgard Lukasser	Austria	27	27	0	0

=== Downhill ===
In women's downhill World Cup 1977/78 the best 5 results count. Five racers had a point deduction, which are given in (). Annemarie Moser-Pröll won 5 races and won the cup with maximum points. She won her sixth Downhill World Cup.

Place	Name	Country	Total	1	5	6	9	10	20	21
1	Annemarie Moser-Pröll	Austria	125	(20)	25	25	25	(20)	25	25
2	Cindy Nelson	United States	91	-	20	20	11	(8)	20	20
3	Marie-Theres Nadig	Switzerland	78	25	(6)	15	8	15	-	15
4	Evi Mittermaier	West Germany	74	6	8	(4)	20	25	15	-
5	Doris de Agostini	Switzerland	51	11	15	8	6	(4)	-	11
6	Irene Epple	West Germany	36	-	11	-	15	6	-	4
7	Irmgard Lukasser	Austria	32	8	3	-	-	2	11	8
8	Brigitte Totschnig	Austria	24	4	2	11	3	-	4	-
9	Bernadette Zurbriggen	Switzerland	23	-	-	-	-	11	6	6
10	Monika Bader	West Germany	16	15	-	-	-	-	-	1

=== Giant slalom ===
In women's giant slalom World Cup 1977/78 the best 5 results count. Five racers had a point deduction, which are given in (). Lise-Marie Morerod won her third Giant slalom World Cup in a row! This record is still unbeaten!

Place	Name	Country	Total	2	4	7	8	16	17	19	22
1	Lise-Marie Morerod	Switzerland	115	25	15	25	-	25	(15)	25	(15)
2	Hanni Wenzel	Liechtenstein	106	11	25	20	25	(8)	25	-	(3)
3	Maria Epple	West Germany	77	20	11	15	11	-	20	-	-
4	Monika Kaserer	Austria	62	15	20	1	20	6	-	-	-
5	Fabienne Serrat	France	60	-	4	11	11	15	(3)	15	-
	Annemarie Moser-Pröll	Austria	60	-	8	4	3	20	-	-	25
7	Lea Sölkner	Austria	36	8	6	8	8	(4)	-	-	6
8	Becky Dorsey	United States	30	6	2	-	1	1	(1)	20	-
	Irene Epple	West Germany	30	-	-	-	-	-	8	2	20
	Cindy Nelson	United States	30	-	(1)	-	2	3	6	8	11

=== Slalom ===
In women's slalom World Cup 1977/78 the best 5 results count. Two racers had a point deduction, which are given in ().

Place	Name	Country	Total	3	11	12	13	14	15	18
1	Hanni Wenzel	Liechtenstein	110	15	20	25	25	25	(11)	(15)
2	Perrine Pelen	France	105	25	15	-	15	-	25	25
3	Fabienne Serrat	France	78	20	-	-	3	20	15	20
4	Lise-Marie Morerod	Switzerland	71	-	25	-	20	15	8	3
5	Lea Sölkner	Austria	65	11	-	15	(2)	8	20	11
6	Maria Epple	West Germany	46	1	11	20	-	-	6	8
7	Christin Cooper	United States	23	-	8	6	8	-	1	-
8	Annemarie Moser-Pröll	Austria	19	8	-	11	-	-	-	-
9	Abbi Fisher	United States	18	-	-	-	6	11	-	1
10	Becky Dorsey	United States	17	-	-	6	-	11	-	-

== Nations Cup ==
=== Overall ===
Place	Country	Total	Men	Ladies
1	Austria	1095	555	540
2	Switzerland	669	267	402
3	United States	460	192	268
4	Liechtenstein	424	150	274
5	West Germany	419	109	310
6	Italy	324	314	10
7	France	288	12	276
8	Sweden	273	273	0
9	Canada	107	96	11
10	Bulgaria	43	43	0
11	Norway	39	39	0
12	Yugoslavia	32	32	0
13	Iran	10	0	10
14	Japan	9	9	0

=== Men ===
All points were shown including individual deduction. But without parallel slalom, because result ? (Also possible, that the parallel slalom was only a show-event.)

Place	Country	Total	DH	GS	SL	Racers	Wins
1	Austria	555	355	62	138	16	7
2	Italy	314	93	65	156	11	3
3	Sweden	273	0	150	123	1	7
4	Switzerland	267	80	164	23	11	0
5	United States	192	0	101	91	3	2
6	Liechtenstein	150	0	114	50	2	2
7	West Germany	109	94	1	14	4	1
8	Canada	96	96	0	0	3	1
9	Bulgaria	43	0	0	43	1	0
10	Norway	39	39	0	0	1	0
11	Yugoslavia	32	0	12	20	1	0
12	France	12	8	2	2	2	0
13	Japan	9	0	0	9	1	0

=== Ladies ===
All points were shown including individual deduction but without parallel slalom, because parallel slalom was only an exhibition event.

Place	Country	Total	DH	GS	SL	Racers	Wins
1	Austria	540	245	178	117	11	6
2	Switzerland	402	169	156	77	7	6
3	West Germany	310	132	113	65	8	1
4	France	276	0	88	188	4	3
5	Liechtenstein	274	4	134	136	2	6
6	United States	268	100	91	77	6	0
7	Canada	11	4	5	2	1	0
8	Italy	10	2	0	8	3	0
	Iran	10	10	0	0	1	0
