= 1976–77 FIS Alpine Ski World Cup =

International sports competition

FIS Alpine Ski World Cup 1976/77
Discipline	Men	Women
Overall	(Sweden) Ingemar Stenmark	(Switzerland) Lise-Marie Morerod
Downhill	(Austria) Franz Klammer	(Austria) Brigitte Totschnig
Giant slalom	(Switzerland) Heini Hemmi	(Switzerland) Lise-Marie Morerod
Slalom	(Sweden) Ingemar Stenmark	(Switzerland) Lise-Marie Morerod
Nations Cup	Austria	Austria
- Nations Cup overall: Austria

Competition
Locations	18	17
Individual	33	27

The 11th World Cup season began in December 1976 in France and concluded in March 1977 in Spain. Ingemar Stenmark of Sweden won his second of three consecutive men's overall titles. Rosi Mittermaier, the defending women's overall champion, retired after the 1976 season, but Annemarie Moser-Pröll, who had won the previous five overall titles, returned from her 1976 sabbatical. However, Lise-Marie Morerod of Switzerland won the women's overall title.

No individual championship was awarded in the Combined discipline, even though both men and women held three combined events, the same as the prior year. The combined discipline championship would not return until 1980.

== Calendar ==
=== Men ===
Event key: DH – Downhill, SL – Slalom, GS – Giant slalom, KB – Combined, PS – Parallel slalom (Nations Cup ranking only)
Race	Season	Date	Place	Type	Winner	Second	Third
230	1	10 December 1976	(France) Val d'Isère	GS _{075}	(United States) Phil Mahre	(Sweden) Ingemar Stenmark	(Austria) Klaus Heidegger
231	2	12 December 1976	(France) Val d'Isère	GS _{076}	(Switzerland) Heini Hemmi	(Italy) Piero Gros	(United States) Phil Mahre
232	3	17 December 1976	(Italy) Val Gardena	DH _{069}	(Austria) Franz Klammer	(Italy) Herbert Plank	(Norway) Erik Håker
233	4	18 December 1976	(Italy) Val Gardena	DH _{070}	(Austria) Franz Klammer	(Austria) Josef Walcher	(Switzerland) Bernhard Russi
234	5	19 December 1976	(Italy) Madonna di Campiglio	SL _{081}	(Italy) Fausto Radici	(Italy) Piero Gros	(Italy) Gustav Thöni
235	6	2 January 1977	(Switzerland) Ebnat-Kappel	GS _{077}	(Switzerland) Heini Hemmi	(Switzerland) Christian Hemmi	(Italy) Gustav Thöni
236	7	3 January 1977	(Switzerland) Laax	SL _{082}	(Sweden) Ingemar Stenmark	(Liechtenstein) Paul Frommelt	(Switzerland) Walter Tresch
237	8	8 January 1977	(West Germany) Garmisch	DH _{071}	(Austria) Franz Klammer	(Austria) Ernst Winkler	(Austria) Peter Wirnsberger
238	9	9 January 1977	(West Germany) Garmisch	GS _{078}	(Austria) Klaus Heidegger	(Switzerland) Heini Hemmi	(Liechtenstein) Willi Frommelt
239	10	9 January 1977	(West Germany) Berchtesgaden	SL _{083}	(Sweden) Ingemar Stenmark	(Austria) Klaus Heidegger	(Austria) Alois Morgenstern
240	11	15 January 1977	(Austria) Kitzbühel	DH _{072}	(Austria) Franz Klammer	(Switzerland) René Berthod	(Switzerland) Bernhard Russi
241	12	16 January 1977	(Austria) Kitzbühel	SL _{084}	(Sweden) Ingemar Stenmark	(Italy) Piero Gros	(Italy) Franco Bieler
242	13	16 January 1977	(Austria) Kitzbühel	KB _{007}	(Italy) Gustav Thöni	(Switzerland) Walter Tresch	(Austria) Anton Steiner
243	14	22 January 1977	(Switzerland) Wengen	DH _{073}	(Austria) Franz Klammer	(West Germany) Sepp Ferstl	(Switzerland) Bernhard Russi
244	15	23 January 1977	(Switzerland) Wengen	SL _{085}	(Sweden) Ingemar Stenmark	(Liechtenstein) Paul Frommelt	(Austria) Klaus Heidegger
245	16	23 January 1977	(Switzerland) Wengen	KB _{008}	(Switzerland) Walter Tresch	(Italy) Gustav Thöni	(West Germany) Sepp Ferstl
246	17	24 January 1977	(Switzerland) Adelboden	GS _{079}	(Switzerland) Heini Hemmi	(Sweden) Ingemar Stenmark	(Austria) Klaus Heidegger
247	18	30 January 1977	(France) Morzine	DH _{074}	(Switzerland) Bernhard Russi	(Austria) Josef Walcher	(Austria) Ernst Winkler
248	19	31 January 1977	(France) Morzine	DH _{075}	(Austria) Josef Walcher	(Italy) Herbert Plank	(Switzerland) Bernhard Russi
249	20	6 February 1977	(Austria) St. Anton	SL _{086}	(Sweden) Ingemar Stenmark	(Austria) Klaus Heidegger	(Liechtenstein) Paul Frommelt
250	21	18 February 1977	(Switzerland) Laax	DH _{076}	(Austria) Franz Klammer	(West Germany) Sepp Ferstl	(Switzerland) Bernhard Russi
251	22	6 February 1977; 18 February 1977	(Austria) St. Anton (SL) (Switzerland) Laax (DH)	KB _{009}	(West Germany) Sepp Ferstl	(Switzerland) Peter Lüscher	(Austria) Franz Klammer
252	23	25 February 1977	(Japan) Furano	GS _{080}	(Austria) Hans Hinterseer	(Austria) Manfred Brunner	(Switzerland) Ernst Good
253	24	27 February 1977	(Japan) Furano	SL _{087}	(Austria) Klaus Heidegger	(Sweden) Ingemar Stenmark	(Italy) Bruno Nöckler
254	25	5 March 1977	(United States) Sun Valley	SL _{088}	(United States) Phil Mahre	(Sweden) Ingemar Stenmark	(United States) Steve Mahre
255	26	6 March 1977	(United States) Sun Valley	GS _{081}	(Sweden) Ingemar Stenmark	(Switzerland) Christian Hemmi	(Switzerland) Heini Hemmi
256	27	12 March 1977	(United States) Heavenly Valley	DH _{077}	(Austria) Josef Walcher	(Austria) Werner Grissmann	(Switzerland) Bernhard Russi
257	28	13 March 1977	(United States) Heavenly Valley	DH _{078}	(Austria) Bartl Gensbichler	(Austria) Ernst Winkler	(West Germany) Peter Fischer
258	29	17 March 1977	(Norway) Voss	GS _{082}	(Austria) Klaus Heidegger	(Italy) Piero Gros	(United States) Phil Mahre
259	30	18 March 1977	(Norway) Voss	SL _{089}	(Sweden) Ingemar Stenmark	(Italy) Piero Gros	(West Germany) Christian Neureuther
260	31	20 March 1977	(Sweden) Åre	SL _{090}	(Sweden) Ingemar Stenmark	(Italy) Franco Bieler	(Italy) Gustav Thöni
261	32	21 March 1977	(Sweden) Åre	GS _{083}	(Sweden) Ingemar Stenmark	(Austria) Klaus Heidegger	(Czechoslovakia) Miloslav Sochor
262	33	25 March 1977	(Spain) Sierra Nevada	GS _{084}	(Sweden) Ingemar Stenmark	(Switzerland) Heini Hemmi	(Switzerland) Christian Hemmi
Nations Cup		26 March 1977	(Spain) Sierra Nevada	PS _{ncr}	(Austria) Manfred Brunner	(Austria) Klaus Heidegger	(Italy) Bruno Nöckler

=== Ladies ===
Event key: DH – Downhill, SL – Slalom, GS – Giant slalom, KB – Combined, PS – Parallel slalom (Nations Cup ranking only)
Race	Season	Date	Place	Type	Winner	Second	Third
224	1	9 December 1976	(France) Val d'Isère	GS _{074}	(Switzerland) Lise-Marie Morerod	(United States) Abbi Fisher	(Austria) Annemarie Moser-Pröll
225	2	11 December 1976	(Italy) Courmayeur	GS _{075}	(Austria) Brigitte Totschnig	(Austria) Lea Solkner	(Liechtenstein) Hanni Wenzel
226	3	15 December 1976	(Italy) Cortina d'Ampezzo	DH _{061}	(Austria) Annemarie Moser-Pröll	(Iran) Elena Matous	(Austria) Brigitte Totschnig
227	4	16 December 1976	(Italy) Cortina d'Ampezzo	SL _{084}	(Switzerland) Lise-Marie Morerod	(Liechtenstein) Hanni Wenzel	(Italy) Claudia Giordani
228	5	16 December 1976	(Italy) Cortina d'Ampezzo	KB _{007}	(Austria) Annemarie Moser-Pröll	(Switzerland) Lise-Marie Morerod	(Liechtenstein) Hanni Wenzel
229	6	20 December 1976	(Austria) Zell am See	DH _{062}	(Austria) Brigitte Totschnig	(Austria) Annemarie Moser-Pröll	(Austria) Nicola Spieß
230	7	21 December 1976	(Austria) Zell am See	DH _{063}	(Austria) Brigitte Totschnig	(Switzerland) Marie-Theres Nadig (Austria) Nicola Spieß	
231	8	3 January 1977	(West Germany) Oberstaufen	SL _{085}	(Switzerland) Lise-Marie Morerod	(Liechtenstein) Hanni Wenzel	(France) Patricia Emonet
232	9	8 January 1977	(West Germany) Pfronten	DH _{064}	(Austria) Annemarie Moser-Pröll	(Switzerland) Marie-Theres Nadig	(West Germany) Irene Epple
233	10	11 January 1977	(West Germany) Garmisch	DH _{065}	(Austria) Annemarie Moser-Pröll	(Switzerland) Bernadette Zurbriggen	(Switzerland) Marie-Theres Nadig
234	11	18 January 1977	(Austria) Schruns	DH _{066}	(Switzerland) Bernadette Zurbriggen	(West Germany) Evi Mittermaier	(Switzerland) Marie-Theres Nadig
235	12	19 January 1977	(Austria) Schruns	SL _{086}	(Switzerland) Lise-Marie Morerod	(France) Fabienne Serrat	(West Germany) Pamela Behr
236	13	19 January 1977	(Austria) Schruns	KB _{008}	(Liechtenstein) Hanni Wenzel	(Switzerland) Lise-Marie Morerod	(Austria) Monika Kaserer
237	14	20 January 1977	(Switzerland) Arosa	GS _{076}	(Switzerland) Lise-Marie Morerod	(Canada) Kathy Kreiner	(Austria) Monika Kaserer
238	15	25 January 1977	(Switzerland) Crans-Montana	DH _{067}	(Austria) Brigitte Totschnig	(West Germany) Evi Mittermaier	(Austria) Annemarie Moser-Pröll
239	16	26 January 1977	(Switzerland) Crans-Montana	SL _{087}	(France) Perrine Pelen	(Switzerland) Lise-Marie Morerod	(France) Fabienne Serrat
240	17	26 January 1977	(Switzerland) Crans-Montana	KB _{009}	(Switzerland) Marie-Theres Nadig	(Austria) Annemarie Moser-Pröll	(Liechtenstein) Hanni Wenzel
241	18	28 January 1977	(France) St. Gervais	SL _{088}	(France) Perrine Pelen	(France) Patricia Emonet	(Austria) Monika Kaserer
242	19	29 January 1977	(France) Megève	GS _{077}	(Austria) Monika Kaserer	(Switzerland) Lise-Marie Morerod	(Austria) Annemarie Moser-Pröll
243	20	1 February 1977	(Socialist Federal Republic of Yugoslavia) Maribor	SL _{089}	(Italy) Claudia Giordani	(Austria) Monika Kaserer	(France) Perrine Pelen
244	21	2 February 1977	(Socialist Federal Republic of Yugoslavia) Maribor	GS _{078}	(Switzerland) Lise-Marie Morerod	(Austria) Monika Kaserer	(France) Fabienne Serrat
245	22	26 February 1977	(Japan) Furano	SL _{090}	(Austria) Regina Sackl	(Austria) Annemarie Moser-Pröll	(Italy) Claudia Giordani
246	23	27 February 1977	(Japan) Furano	GS _{079}	(Austria) Monika Kaserer	(Switzerland) Lise-Marie Morerod	(Austria) Annemarie Moser-Pröll
247	24	5 March 1977	(United States) Sun Valley	SL _{091}	(France) Perrine Pelen	(Italy) Claudia Giordani	(Austria) Monika Kaserer
248	25	6 March 1977	(United States) Sun Valley	GS _{080}	(Switzerland) Lise-Marie Morerod	(Canada) Kathy Kreiner	(United States) Abbi Fisher
249	26	12 March 1977	(United States) Heavenly Valley	DH _{068}	(Austria) Brigitte Totschnig	(West Germany) Evi Mittermaier	(Switzerland) Doris de Agostini
250	27	24 March 1977	(Spain) Sierra Nevada	GS _{081}	(Switzerland) Lise-Marie Morerod	(Austria) Ingrid Eberle	(Liechtenstein) Ursula Konzett
Nations Cup		26 March 1977	(Spain) Sierra Nevada	PS _{ncr}	(West Germany) Christa Zechmeister	(Switzerland) Marie-Theres Nadig	(Austria) Annemarie Moser-Pröll

== Men ==
=== Overall ===
The Men's overall World Cup 1976/77 was most likely also divided into two periods, but no racer had a point deduction.

Place	Name	Country	Total	DH	GS	SL	KB
1	Ingemar Stenmark	Sweden	339	0	124	215	0
2	Klaus Heidegger	Austria	250	0	129	121	0
3	Franz Klammer	Austria	203	180	0	0	23
4	Piero Gros	Italy	165	0	76	89	0
5	Bernhard Russi	Switzerland	148	148	0	0	0
6	Gustav Thöni	Italy	145	0	29	71	45
7	Heini Hemmi	Switzerland	133	0	130	3	0
8	Josef Walcher	Austria	115	115	0	0	0
9	Phil Mahre	United States	100	0	75	27	0
10	Paul Frommelt	Liechtenstein	99	0	4	95	0
11	Sepp Ferstl	West Germany	97	46	0	0	51
12	Franco Bieler	Italy	92	0	26	66	0
13	Walter Tresch	Italy	89	15	0	29	45
14	Hansi Hinterseer	Austria	82	0	53	29	0
15	Christian Hemmi	Switzerland	69	0	68	1	0

=== Downhill ===
In men's downhill World Cup 1976/77 the best 5 results count. Six racers had a point deduction, which are given in (). Franz Klammer won 5 races in a row and won the cup with maximum points. Together with the last 4 downhill races last season 1975/76, he won 9 downhill races in a row, and Klammer won his third Downhill World Cup in a row. Austrian skiers won 9 races out of 10.

Place	Name	Country	Total	3	4	8	11	14	18	19	21	27	28
1	Franz Klammer	Austria	125	25	25	25	25	25	(11)	(11)	(25)	(8)	-
2	Josef Walcher	Austria	101	-	20	(8)	-	11	20	25	-	25	(6)
3	Bernhard Russi	Switzerland	85	(11)	15	(11)	15	15	25	15	(15)	(15)	(11)
4	Ernst Winkler	Austria	64	-	-	20	8	-	15	1	(1)	(1)	20
5	Herbert Plank	Italy	56	20	4	-	4	-	8	20	-	-	-
6	Sepp Ferstl	West Germany	46	-	-	-	3	20	3	-	20	-	-
7	Werner Grissmann	Austria	45	(3)	11	-	-	4	-	-	6	20	4
8	Peter Wirnsberger	Austria	35	4	(1)	15	6	2	-	8	-	-	(1)
	René Berthod	Switzerland	35	-	-	-	20	4	-	6	3	-	2
10	Peter Fischer	West Germany	34	-	-	-	-	6	-	-	2	11	15
11	Bartl Gensbichler	Austria	29	-	-	2	-	-	-	-	-	2	25

=== Giant slalom ===
In men's giant slalom World Cup 1976/77 the best 5 results count. Seven racers had a point deduction, which are given in (). Due to the tiebreak rules then in effect, Ingemar Stenmark failed to win his third Giant slalom World Cup in a row, as the reigning Olympic Champion Heini Hemmi, who scored the same number of retained points (115), achieved the better sixth result throughout the season in that event (3rd place at Sun Valley).

Place	Name	Country	Total	1	2	6	9	17	23	26	29	32	33
1	Heini Hemmi	Switzerland	115	-	25	25	20	25	-	(15)	-	-	20
2	Ingemar Stenmark	Sweden	115	20	(6)	(3)	-	20	-	25	-	25	25
3	Klaus Heidegger	Austria	100	15	(8)	(11)	25	15	(8)	-	25	20	(2)
4	Phil Mahre	United States	72	25	15	-	11	-	-	(3)	15	-	6
5	Piero Gros	Italy	70	11	20	8	(2)	(3)	-	11	20	(1)	-
6	Christian Hemmi	Switzerland	65	2	-	20	(1)	8	-	20	-	(2)	15
7	Hansi Hinterseer	Austria	53	6	-	6	8	-	25	-	8	-	-
8	Willi Frommelt	Liechtenstein	40	4	2	-	15	-	11	(2)	8	-	(1)
9	Manfred Brunner	Austria	32	-	-	-	-	-	20	-	4	4	4
10	Gustav Thöni	Italy	29	-	3	15	-	-	3	-	-	8	-

=== Slalom ===
In men's slalom World Cup 1976/77 the best 5 results count. Nine racers had a point deduction, which are given in (). Ingemar Stenmark won five races in a row and won the cup with maximum points. He won seven races out of ten and won his third Slalom World Cup in a row!

Place	Name	Country	Total	5	7	10	12	15	20	24	25	30	31
1	Ingemar Stenmark	Sweden	125	-	25	25	25	25	25	(20)	(20)	(25)	(25)
2	Klaus Heidegger	Austria	91	11	-	20	(11)	15	20	25	-	(11)	(8)
3	Paul Frommelt	Liechtenstein	77	(2)	20	(8)	(6)	20	15	(2)	11	-	11
4	Piero Gros	Italy	76	20	(3)	(6)	20	-	8	(4)	-	20	8
5	Gustav Thöni	Italy	63	15	11	-	(8)	11	-	11	-	-	15
6	Franco Bieler	Italy	58	(4)	(4)	-	15	-	11	-	6	6	20
7	Fausto Radici	Italy	53	25	8	4	(4)	8	-	8	(1)	-	-
8	Christian Neureuther	West Germany	30	-	-	3	-	2	6	-	4	15	(2)
9	Walter Tresch	Switzerland	29	-	15	-	-	6	-	-	-	8	-
10	Hansi Hinterseer	Austria	28	6	1	11	2	-	(1)	-	8	-	-
11	Alois Morgenstern	Austria	27	8	-	15	3	1	-	-	-	-	-
12	Phil Mahre	United States	25	-	-	-	-	-	-	-	25	-	-

=== Combined ===
After the first ever Combined World Cup 1975/76, in this season 1976/77 there were no special discipline world cup for Combined awarded. All three results only count for the Overall World Cup.

Place	Name	Country	Total	13	16	22
1	Sepp Ferstl	West Germany	51	11	15	25
2	Walter Tresch	Switzerland	45	20	25	-
	Gustav Thöni	Italy	45	25	20	-
4	Franz Klammer	Austria	23	8	-	15
5	Peter Lüscher	Switzerland	20	-	-	20
6	Hans Enn	Austria	19	-	11	8
7	Leonhard Stock	Austria	16	4	8	4
8	Anton Steiner	Austria	15	15	-	-
	Michael Veith	West Germany	15	-	4	11
	Peter Müller	Switzerland	15	3	6	6

== Ladies ==
=== Overall ===
The Women's overall World Cup 1976/77 was divided into two periods. From the first 16 races the best 8 results count and from the last 11 races the best 7 results count. Six racers had a point deduction.

Place	Name	Country	Total
1	Lise-Marie Morerod	Switzerland	319
2	Annemarie Moser-Pröll	Austria	246
3	Monika Kaserer	Austria	196
4	Brigitte Totschnig	Austria	186
5	Hanni Wenzel	Liechtenstein	150
6	Marie-Theres Nadig	Switzerland	133
7	Perrine Pelen	France	132
8	Claudia Giordani	Italy	121
9	Fabienne Serrat	France	85
10	Bernadette Zurbriggen	Switzerland	78
11	Evi Mittermaier	West Germany	77
12	Regina Sackl	Austria	74
13	Kathy Kreiner	Canada	65
14	Nicola Spieß	Austria	61
15	Lea Sölkner	Austria	59

=== Downhill ===
In women's downhill World Cup 1976/77 the best 5 results count. Seven racers had point a deduction, which are given in (). Austrian skiers won 7 races out of 8.

Place	Name	Country	Total	3	6	7	9	10	11	15	26
1	Brigitte Totschnig	Austria	115	15	25	25	(11)	(6)	(11)	25	25
2	Annemarie Moser-Pröll	Austria	110	25	20	-	25	25	-	15	(8)
3	Marie-Theres Nadig	Switzerland	81	(2)	(2)	20	20	15	15	11	(11)
4	Evi Mittermaier	West Germany	74	6	-	(3)	-	8	20	20	20
5	Bernadette Zurbriggen	Switzerland	63	-	-	6	8	20	25	4	-
6	Nicola Spieß	Austria	60	11	15	20	6	(1)	8	-	-
7	Irene Epple	West Germany	43	3	(1)	(2)	15	11	6	8	-
8	Elena Matous	Iran	33	20	8	4	-	-	1	-	-
9	Brigitte Schroll	Austria	26	4	11	8	-	3	-	-	-
10	Cindy Nelson	United States	22	8	3	11	-	-	-	-	-

=== Giant slalom ===
In women's giant slalom World Cup 1976/77 the best 5 results count. Five racers had a point deduction, which are given in (). Lise-Marie Morerod won 5 races and won the cup with maximum points.

Place	Name	Country	Total	1	2	14	19	21	23	25	27
1	Lise-Marie Morerod	Switzerland	125	25	-	25	(20)	25	(20)	25	25
2	Monika Kaserer	Austria	93	(4)	-	15	25	20	25	8	-
3	Annemarie Moser-Pröll	Austria	60	15	4	(1)	15	-	15	(3)	11
4	Kathy Kreiner	Canada	59	8	8	20	-	-	3	20	(3)
5	Abbi Fisher	United States	39	20	-	-	4	-	-	15	-
	Brigitte Totschnig	Austria	39	-	25	-	1	-	2	11	-
7	Lea Sölkner	Austria	36	2	20	-	2	11	-	1	(1)
8	Hanni Wenzel	Liechtenstein	31	-	15	-	-	8	8	-	-
	Becky Dorsey	United States	31	1	-	8	3	-	11	-	8
	Fabienne Serrat	France	31	-	-	4	6	15	-	-	6

=== Slalom ===
In women's slalom World Cup 1976/77 the best 5 results count. Five racers had a point deduction, which are given in ().

Place	Name	Country	Total	4	8	12	16	18	20	22	24
1	Lise-Marie Morerod	Switzerland	106	25	25	25	20	-	-	-	11
2	Perrine Pelen	France	98	(3)	-	8	25	25	15	(4)	25
3	Claudia Giordani	Italy	86	15	-	(2)	11	(8)	25	15	20
4	Monika Kaserer	Austria	65	4	11	(3)	(4)	15	20	-	15
5	Hanni Wenzel	Liechtenstein	57	20	20	11	3	-	-	3	-
6	Regina Sackl	Austria	56	11	8	4	-	-	8	25	-
7	Fabienne Serrat	France	49	-	4	20	15	4	6	-	(2)
8	Patricia Emonet	France	41	-	15	-	6	20	-	-	-
9	Pamela Behr	Austria	40	-	-	15	8	11	-	6	-
10	Christa Zechmeister	West Germany	30	-	6	6	(2)	3	11	-	4

=== Combined ===
After the first ever Combined World Cup 1975/76, in this season 1976/77 there were no special discipline world cup for Combined awarded. All three results only count for the Overall World Cup.

Place	Name	Country	Total	5	13	17
1	Hanni Wenzel	Liechtenstein	55	15	25	15
2	Lise-Marie Morerod	Switzerland	48	20	20	8
3	Annemarie Moser-Pröll	Austria	45	25	-	20
4	Marie-Theres Nadig	Switzerland	36	-	11	25
5	Monika Kaserer	Austria	32	6	15	11
6	Cindy Nelson	United States	11	11	-	-
7	Claudia Giordani	Italy	10	8	2	-
8	Christa Zechmeister	West Germany	8	-	8	-
	Danièle Debernard	France	8	4	4	-
	Lea Sölkner	Austria	8	-	6	2

== Nations Cup ==
=== Overall ===
Place	Country	Total	Men	Ladies
1	Austria	1973	1001	972
2	Switzerland	1153	602	551
3	Italy	688	567	121
4	West Germany	381	200	181
5	Liechtenstein	370	193	177
6	Sweden	364	364	0
7	France	311	1	310
8	United States	300	144	156
9	Canada	69	4	65
10	Iran	39	0	39
11	Czechoslovakia	24	24	0
12	Norway	21	21	0
13	Yugoslavia	15	15	0
14	Japan	4	4	0
15	Australia	3	3	0
16	Bulgaria	1	1	0

=== Men ===
Place	Country	Total	DH	GS	SL	KB	Racers	Wins
1	Austria	1001	533	218	177	73	14	13
2	Switzerland	602	237	251	34	80	12	5
3	Italy	567	58	149	313	47	8	2
4	Sweden	364	0	142	222	0	3	10
5	West Germany	200	97	0	32	71	4	1
6	Liechtenstein	193	0	74	113	6	3	0
7	United States	144	6	94	40	4	6	2
8	Czechoslovakia	24	0	20	4	0	2	0
9	Norway	21	19	0	2	0	2	0
10	Yugoslavia	15	0	3	12	0	1	0
11	Japan	4	0	0	4	0	1	0
12	Canada	4	0	0	0	4	2	0
13	Australia	3	3	0	0	0	1	0
14	Bulgaria	1	0	0	1	0	1	0
	France	1	0	1	0	0	1	0

=== Ladies ===
Place	Country	Total	DH	GS	SL	KB	Racers	Wins
1	Austria	972	378	281	218	95	11	12
2	Switzerland	551	178	179	106	88	5	10
3	France	310	1	72	220	17	5	3
4	West Germany	181	123	6	43	9	7	0
5	Liechtenstein	177	19	46	57	55	2	1
6	United States	156	31	93	21	11	8	0
7	Italy	121	0	15	96	10	1	1
8	Canada	65	3	62	0	0	1	0
9	Iran	39	33	6	0	0	1	0
