= Challenger (ski course) =

Downhill competition venue in Idaho, USA

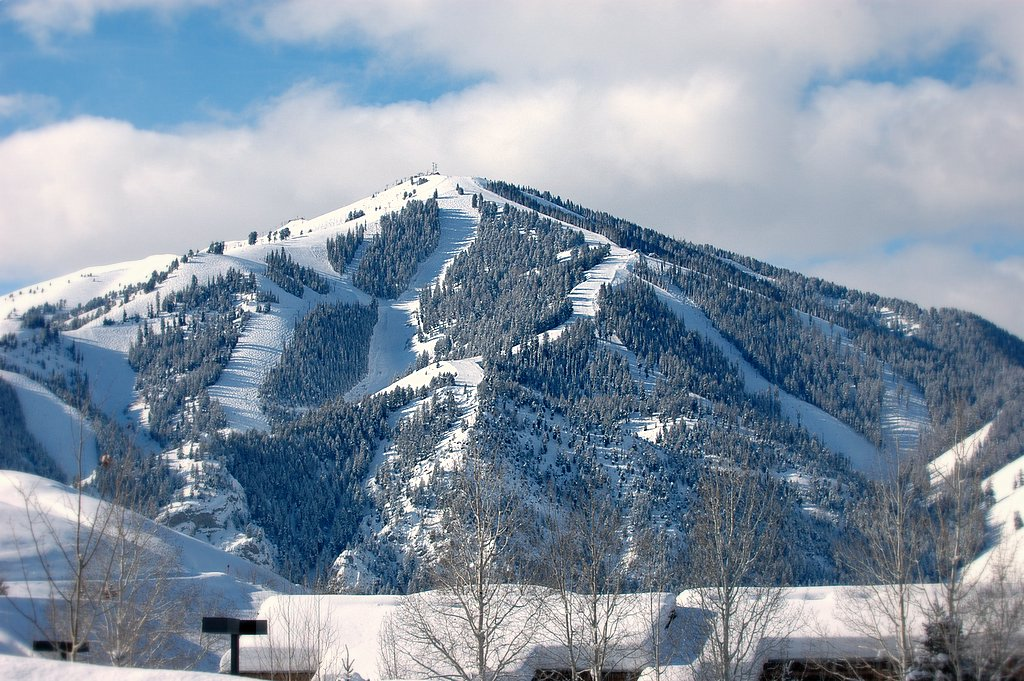
- Bald Mountain from northeast
- Interactive map of Challenger
- Location in the United States Location in Idaho
- 43°40′44″N 114°24′14″W
- Location: Sun Valley, Idaho
- Mountain: Bald Mountain
- Opened: 13 March 1975 (race course) (51 years ago)

Downhill
- Start: 8,783 ft (2,677 m) AMSL
- Finish: 6,076 ft (1,852 m)
- Vertical drop: 2,707 ft (825 m)
- Length: 1.53 mi (2.459 km)
- Max incline: 28.8 degrees (55%)
- Avg incline: 18.5 degrees (33%)
- Min incline: 5.7 degrees (10%)

Super-G
- Start: 8,120 ft (2,475 m) AMSL
- Finish: 6,076 ft (1,852 m)
- Vertical drop: 2,044 ft (623 m)
- Length: 1.17 mi (1.876 km)
- Max incline: 28.8 degrees (55%)
- Avg incline: 18.3 degrees (33%)
- Min incline: 5.7 degrees (10%)

Giant slalom
- Start: 7,356 ft (2,242 m) AMSL
- Finish: 6,043 ft (1,842 m)
- Vertical drop: 1,312 ft (400 m)

Challenger is a World Cup downhill ski course in the western United States, on the north slope of Bald Mountain in Sun Valley, Idaho. The course is part of Sun Valley Ski Resort, the most prestigious in Idaho.

Tom Johnston, a very controversial character known as "Cowboy", designed the new or mostly renovated slope, starting on the original old course at Steilhang Traverse; in mid-section it runs left from the original slope, then returns for the finish on the same terrain as the old one. Challenger has the steepest average incline on the World Cup circuit at 36%, surpassing even the Streif course in Kitzbühel. With a vertical drop of 2,707 feet (825 m), the steepness provides a very demanding but relatively short course at 1.53 miles (2.46 km); lasting about 85 seconds, the average vertical descent rate is approximately 32 feet (9.8 m) per second.

== Course ==
=== History ===
The Challenger was a steam locomotive introduced by the Union Pacific Railroad in 1936, the year it founded and opened Sun Valley ski resort with the first ski chairlift in the world.

This particular ski course hosted World Cup technical events in the 1970s, in March 1975 and 1977; Ingemar Stenmark, Hanni Wenzel, Gustav Thöni, and Phil Mahre won early events here. It also served as a training facility for alpine skiing during the 2002 Winter Olympics in northern Utah.

After 48 years, this course at Sun Valley returned to the World Cup circuit in March 2025, hosting the season finals. Located west of the Challenger chairlift, portions of several runs are used for the course, including International, Greyhawk, and Hemingway. The season finals are scheduled to return in March 2027.

=== Sections ===
- Sawtooth Jump
- Durrance Dive
- The Legends
- Carol's Wagon Wheel
- Steilhang Traverse
- Frontier Jump
- The Sluice
- Rudi's Roll
- Cowboy's Corner
- The Redd
- Proctor Park

== World Cup ==
=== Men ===
No.	Season	Date	Type	Winner	Second	Third
201	1974/75	13 March 1975	GS	(Sweden) Ingemar Stenmark	(Italy) Piero Gros	(Italy) Gustav Thöni
202	1974/75	15 March 1975	SL	(Italy) Gustav Thöni	(Italy) Piero Gros	(Sweden) Ingemar Stenmark
254	1976/77	5 March 1977	SL	(United States) Phil Mahre	(Sweden) Ingemar Stenmark	(United States) Steve Mahre
255	1976/77	6 March 1977	GS	(Sweden) Ingemar Stenmark	(Switzerland) Christian Hemmi	(Switzerland) Heini Hemmi
	2024/25	22 March 2025	DH	delayed by snowfall, cancelled due to strong wind		
1962	2024/25	23 March 2025	SG	(Austria) Lukas Feurstein	(Austria) Raphael Haaser	(Switzerland) Franjo von Allmen
1963	2024/25	26 March 2025	GS	(Switzerland) Loïc Meillard	(Switzerland) Marco Odermatt	(Norway) Henrik Kristoffersen
1964	2024/25	27 March 2025	SL	(Norway) Timon Haugan	(France) Clément Noël	(Austria) Fabio Gstrein

=== Women ===
No.	Season	Date	Type	Winner	Second	Third
194	1974/75	13 March 1975	GS	(Switzerland) Lise-Marie Morerod	(Austria) Monika Kaserer	(France) Fabienne Serrat
195	1974/75	14 March 1975	SL	(Liechtenstein) Hanni Wenzel	(Austria) Annemarie Moser-Pröll	(West Germany) Christa Zechmeister
247	1976/77	5 March 1977	SL	(France) Perrine Pelen	(Italy) Claudia Giordani	(Austria) Monika Kaserer
248	1976/77	6 March 1977	GS	(Switzerland) Lise-Marie Morerod	(Canada) Kathy Kreiner	(United States) Abbi Fisher
	2024/25	22 March 2025	DH	delayed by snowfall, cancelled due to strong wind		
1843	2024/25	23 March 2025	SG	(Switzerland) Lara Gut-Behrami	(United States) Lindsey Vonn	(Italy) Federica Brignone
1844	2024/25	25 March 2025	GS	(Switzerland) Lara Gut-Behrami	(Italy) Federica Brignone	(Sweden) Sara Hector
1845	2024/25	27 March 2025	SL	(United States) Mikaela Shiffrin	(Germany) Lena Dürr	(Slovenia) Andreja Slokar

=== Note ===
- Greyhawk / Hemingway is the name for technical (GS and SL) events course, which is the bottom half of the Challenger course.
