= Max Heidegger =

American basketball player (born 1997)

Max Heidegger מקס היידגר
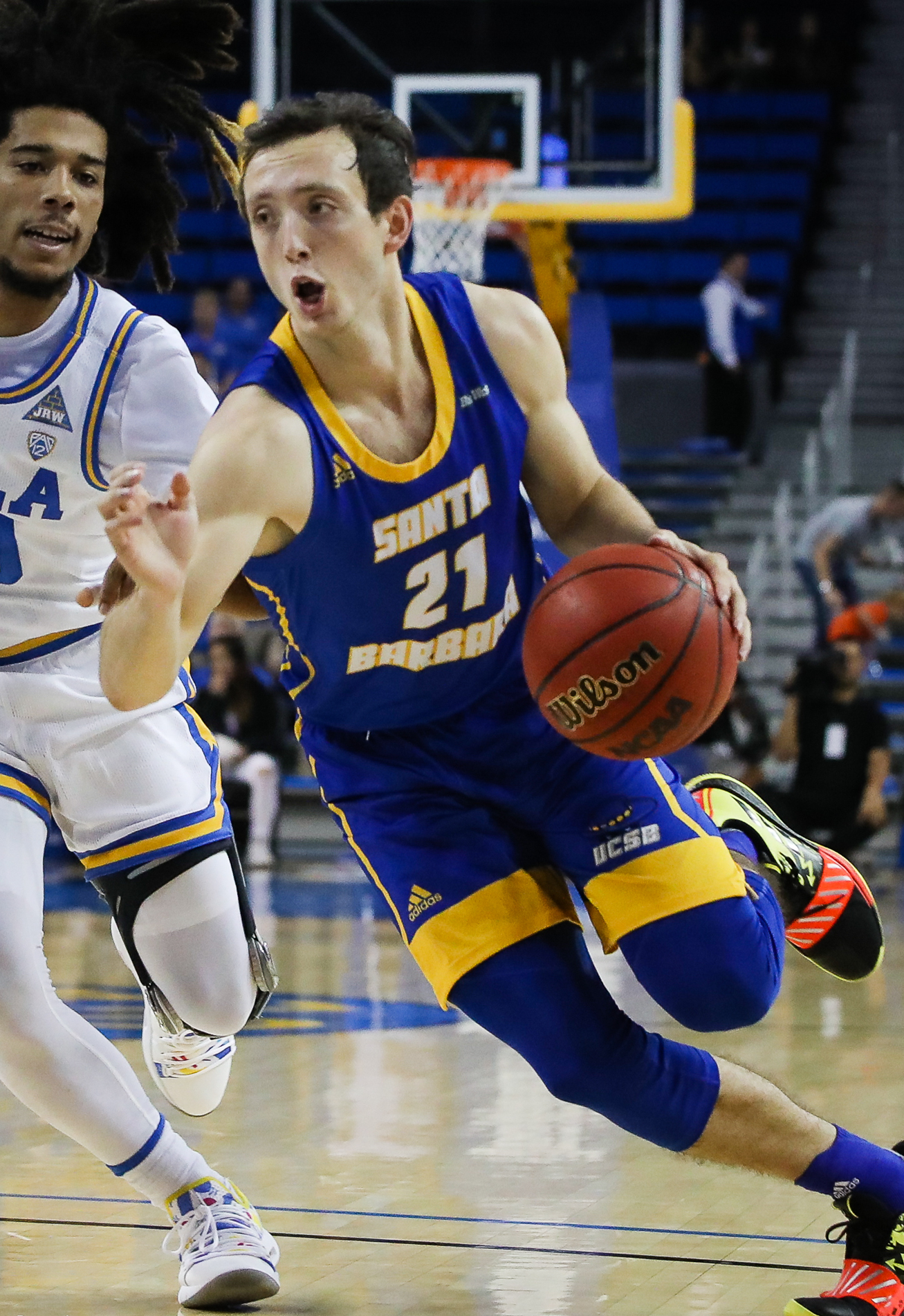
- Heidegger with UC Santa Barbara in 2019

No. 33 – Hapoel Tel Aviv
- Position: Point guard
- League: Israeli Basketball Premier League; EuroLeague

Personal information
- Born: June 5, 1997 (age 29) Los Angeles, California, U.S.
- Listed height: 6 ft 3 in (1.91 m)
- Listed weight: 180 lb (82 kg)

Career information
- High school: Crespi Carmelite (Encino, California); Blair Academy (Blairstown, New Jersey); Oaks Christian School (Westlake Village, California)
- College: UC Santa Barbara (2016–2020)
- NBA draft: 2020: undrafted
- Playing career: 2020–present

Career history
- 2020–2021: Maccabi Tel Aviv
- 2020–2021: →Bnei Herzliya
- 2021–2022: EWE Baskets Oldenburg
- 2022–2023: Yukatel Merkezefendi
- 2023: Saski Baskonia
- 2023–2024: Windy City Bulls
- 2024: Umana Reyer Venezia
- 2024: Türk Telekom
- 2025–2026: Bnei Herzliya
- 2026: San Pablo Burgos
- 2026–present: Hapoel Tel Aviv

Career highlights
- 2× First-team All-Big West (2018, 2020)
- Stats at NBA.com
- Stats at Basketball Reference

Maximilian Heidegger (Hebrew: מקס היידגר; born June 5, 1997) is an American-Israeli professional basketball player for Hapoel Tel Aviv of the Israeli Basketball Premier League and the EuroLeague. He also plays for the Israel national basketball team.

He played college basketball for UC Santa Barbara. Playing for them, he was twice named First-team All-Big West Conference. He began his professional career in Israel, and later played in Germany, Turkey, Spain, Italy, and the NBA G League before returning to Israel.

== High school career ==
Heidegger played for two years at Crespi Carmelite High School in Encino. As a freshman in 2012-13, Heidegger averaged 15.7 points per game. He suffered back stress fractures as a sophomore, which sidelined him mid-season; before his season ended he averaged 19.4 points, 2.8 rebounds, 1.4 assists, and 1.5 steals per game.

As a junior, he transferred to Blair Academy in New Jersey, but did not play basketball.

Heidegger transferred to Oaks Christian School for his senior year, in Westlake Village, California. He scored a career-high 40 points on February 6, 2016, in a 76–66 win against Agoura High School. For the season, Heidegger averaged 28.0 points, 5.9 rebounds, 2.9 assists, and 1.4 steals per game. He was named to the Southern Section All-Division 4A Team, Los Angeles Daily News All-Area Team, First Team All-California Interscholastic Federation, First Team All-Marmonte League, and Ventura County Star All-County Team.

== College career ==
As a freshman at UC Santa Barbara in 2016-17, in 26 games Heidegger averaged 20.5 minutes, 7.6 points, 2.1 rebounds, and 1.4 assists per game, though the team struggled to a 6–22 record.

On November 11, 2017, Heidegger scored a career-high 33 points while shooting 8-of-14 from beyond the arc in an 85–66 win against North Dakota State. In 32 games as a sophomore in 2017-18 he averaged 32.9 minutes, 19.1 points (2nd in the Big West Conference), 2.5 rebounds, and 2.5 assists per game as a sophomore, shooting 40.4% from three-point range. Heidegger earned First Team All-Big West honors.

In 2018-19, he averaged 30.5 minutes, 11.9 points, 3.0 rebounds, and 2.7 assists per game as a junior, while shooting 84.9% from the free throw line.

On November 27, 2019, Heidegger suffered a concussion after hitting his head on a metal railing along the baseline during a game against Portland State, forcing him to miss more than a month of the season. On February 1, 2020, he nearly posted a triple-double with 14 points, 11 assists, and nine rebounds in an 87–62 win against Long Beach State. Heidegger had a season-high 31 points on February 13, in an 84–75 loss at UC Davis. He suffered a season-ending serious left ankle injury on February 27 against UC Riverside. As a senior, in 2019-20 Heidegger led UC Santa Barbara in scoring at 16.0 points per game, and also averaged 31.9 minutes, 3.2 assists, and 2.4 rebounds per game, while shooting 46.3% from the field. He was named to the First Team All-Big West. Heidegger finished his college career with 1,347 points, ranking 15th on the Gauchos' all-time scoring list.

== Professional career ==
=== Maccabi Tel Aviv (2020) ===
On September 22, 2020, Heidegger signed his first professional contract with Maccabi Playtika Tel Aviv of the Israeli Basketball Premier League. He played two games for the team, in which he played a total of seven minutes.

=== Bnei Herzliya (2020–2021) ===
On December 5, 2020, Heidegger was loaned to Bnei Herzliya of the Israeli Basketball Premier League. In 25 games, he averaged 28.6 minutes, 18.2 points (6th in the league), 2.0 rebounds, 2.6 assists, and 1.1 steals per game, while shooting 50.0% from the floor, 41.8% from three point range, and 79.3% from the free throw line.

=== Baskets Oldenburg (2021–2022) ===
On July 9, 2021, Heidegger signed with EWE Baskets Oldenburg of the German Basketball Bundesliga. In 26 German league games played, he averaged 27.2 minutes, 18.3 points (4th in the league), 2.2 rebounds, and 4.5 assists per game, while shooting 47.0% from the field.

He played for the Atlanta Hawks in the 2021 NBA summer league, scoring 12 points in 15 minutes on 4–8 shooting at his debut in a 85–83 loss against the Boston Celtics and fellow Israeli Yam Madar.

=== Yukatel Merkezefendi (2022–2023) ===
On August 1, 2022, Heidegger signed with Yukatel Merkezefendi of the Turkish Basketball Super League (BSL). He averaged 19.5 points (2nd in the league), 2.9 rebounds, and 6.3 assists(3rd) per game in 15 BSL games played.

He again played for the Atlanta Hawks in the NBA 2023 Summer League, playing one game.

=== Saski Baskonia (2023) ===
On January 28, 2023, Heidegger signed with Saski Baskonia of the Liga ACB and the EuroLeague, for whom he played in 30 games. On July 3, he parted ways with the Spanish club.

=== Windy City Bulls (2023–2024) ===
On September 8, 2023, Heidegger signed with the Chicago Bulls. He was waived on October 12. On November 2, he joined the Windy City Bulls in the G Leaque. In 2023-24 with the team, he played 10 games in which he averaged 24.7 minutes, 12.9 points, 1.5 rebounds, and 3.6 assists per game, while shooting 40.6% from three point range.

=== Reyer Venezia (2024) ===
On January 8, 2024, Heidegger signed with Umana Reyer Venezia of the Lega Basket Serie A and the EuroCup. In 30 games, he averaged 20.5 minutes, 10.1 points, 2.0 rebounds, and 2.0 assists per game, while shooting 41.4% from three point range.

=== Türk Telekom (2024) ===
On June 17, 2024, he signed with Türk Telekom of the Turkish Basketbol Süper Ligi (BSL). On October 30, 2024, he left the team. In three games, he averaged 8 points, 2 rebounds and 3.7 assists per game. He also played 5 games in Eurocup where he had 3.4 points, 1 rebound, and 2 assists per game.

=== Return to Bnei Herzliya (2025–2026) ===
On August 2, 2025, Heidegger returned to Bnei Herzliya, for whom he played in 30 games. He averaged 25.1 minutes, 13.3 points, 2.6 rebounds, and 2.8 assists per game, while shooting 47.1% from the field and 40.0% from three-point range..

=== San Pablo Burgos (2026) ===
On April 4, 2026, he signed for San Pablo Burgos of the Spanish Liga ACB. In 9 games, he averaged 18.1 minutes, 12.4 points, 1.1 rebounds, and 1.6 assists per game, while shooting 48.1% from the floor, 41.8% from three point range, and 86.7% from the free throw line.

=== Hapoel Tel Aviv (2026–present) ===
On September 6, 2026, Heidegger signed with Hapoel Tel Aviv of the Israeli Israeli Basketball Premier League and the EuroLeague.

== National team career ==
Heidegger made his debut for the Israel national basketball team in the 2023 FIBA Basketball World Cup 2023 European Qualifiers.

== Career statistics ==
Legend
GP	Games played	GS	Games started	MPG	Minutes per game
FG%	Field-goal percentage	3P%	3-point field-goal percentage	FT%	Free-throw percentage
RPG	Rebounds per game	APG	Assists per game	SPG	Steals per game
BPG	Blocks per game	PPG	Points per game	PIR	Performance index rating
**Bold**	Career high

=== EuroLeague ===
Year	Team	GP	GS	MPG	FG%	3P%	FT%	RPG	APG	SPG	BPG	PPG	PIR
2022–23	Baskonia	12	0	8.8	.320	.286	1.000	.3	2.0	.2	—	2.5	2.1
Career		12	0	8.8	.320	.286	1.000	.3	2.0	.2	—	2.5	2.1

== Personal life ==
Heidegger was born June 5, 1997, in Los Angeles, California, and is the son of Jami and Klaus Heidegger. His father is an Austrian former alpine skier who finished second overall at the 1976–77 FIS Alpine Ski World Cup. He later became a successful entrepreneur in the United States. Heidegger's parents owned the beauty brand Kiehl's before selling it to L'Oréal for an estimated $100 million to $150 million in 2000. His mother has a lung disease. Heidegger is Jewish, and is fluent in English and German.
