= FIS Alpine World Ski Championships 1978 =

Skiing event in Garmisch-Partenkirchen, West Germany

- Host city: Garmisch-Partenkirchen, Bavaria, West Germany
- Events: 6
- Opening: 28 January 1978
- Closing: 5 February 1978
- Opened by: Willi Ritschard
- Main venue: Garmisch Classic, Gudiberg (slalom)

Location in the Alps of Europe
Location in southern Germany

The FIS Alpine World Ski Championships 1978 were held in Garmisch-Partenkirchen, Bavaria, West Germany, between 29 January and 5 February. It held competitions in alpine skiing like downhill, special slalom, giant slalom and combined. The combined was only a "paper race".

The event is the last time the championships were held here until 2011. Garmisch hosted the first Olympic alpine skiing competition (Combined event), at the 1936 games.

== Men's competitions ==
=== Downhill ===
Sunday, 29 January

Place	Athlete	Nation	Time	Diff.
1st place, gold medalist(s)	Josef Walcher	Austria (AUT)	2:04.12	–
2nd place, silver medalist(s)	Michael Veith	West Germany (FRG)	2:04.19	+ 0.07
3rd place, bronze medalist(s)	Werner Grissmann	Austria (AUT)	2:04.46	+ 0.32
4	Sepp Ferstl	West Germany (FRG)	2:04.49	+ 0.35
5	Peter Müller	Switzerland (SUI)	2:04.77	+ 0.65
5	Franz Klammer	Austria (AUT)	2:04.77	+ 0.65
7	Steve Podborski	Canada (CAN)	2:04.98	+ 0.86
8	Walter Vesti	Switzerland (SUI)	2:06.13	+ 2.01
9	Vladimir Makeev	Soviet Union (URS)	2:06.20	+ 2.08
10	Herbert Plank	Italy (ITA)	2:06.31	+ 2.19

=== Giant slalom ===
Thursday, 2 February

Place	Athlete	Nation	Time	Diff.	Run 1	Run 2
1st place, gold medalist(s)	Ingemar Stenmark	Sweden (SWE)	3:02.52	–	1:35.48	1:27.04
2nd place, silver medalist(s)	Andreas Wenzel	Liechtenstein (LIE)	3:04.56	+ 2.04	1:37.32	1:27.24
3rd place, bronze medalist(s)	Willi Frommelt	Liechtenstein (LIE)	3:04.75	+ 2.23	1:36.71	1:28.04
4	Sepp Ferstl	West Germany (FRG)	3:04.87	+ 2.35
5	Phil Mahre	United States (USA)	3:04.94	+ 2.42
6	Hans Enn	Austria (AUT)	3:05.27	+ 2.75
7	Peter Lüscher	Switzerland (SUI)	3:06.13	+ 3.51
8	Pete Patterson	United States (USA)	3:06.82	+ 4.30
9	Cary Adgate	United States (USA)	3:07.10	+ 4.58
10	Bruno Nöckler	Italy (ITA)	3:07.20	+ 4.68

=== Slalom ===
Sunday, 5 February

Place	Athlete	Nation	Time	Diff.	Run 1	Run 2
1st place, gold medalist(s)	Ingemar Stenmark	Sweden (SWE)	1:39.54	–	51.56	47.98
2nd place, silver medalist(s)	Piero Gros	Italy (ITA)	1:40.20	+ 0.66	51.29	48.91
3rd place, bronze medalist(s)	Paul Frommelt	Liechtenstein (LIE)	1:40.47	+ 0.93	52.24	48.23
4	Anton Steiner	Austria (AUT)	1:40.74	+ 1.20
5	Mauro Bernardi	Italy (ITA)	1:42.20	+ 2.66
6	Christian Neureuther	West Germany (FRG)	1:42.74	+ 3.20
7	Toshihiro Kaiwa	Japan (JPN)	1:43.20	+ 3.66
8	Steve Mahre	United States (USA)	1:43.76	+ 4.22
9	Torsten Jakobsson	Sweden (SWE)	1:44.16	+ 4.62
10	Peter Aelig	Switzerland (SUI)	1:44.44	+ 4.90

=== Combined ===
Place	Athlete	Nation	Points	DH	GS	SL
1st place, gold medalist(s)	Andreas Wenzel	Liechtenstein (LIE)	2732.34	13	2nd place, silver medalist(s)	18
2nd place, silver medalist(s)	Sepp Ferstl	West Germany (FRG)	2749.64	4	31	29
3rd place, bronze medalist(s)	Pete Patterson	United States (USA)	2752.28	25	8	23
4	Vladimir Andreyev	Soviet Union (URS)	2773.87
5	Valeri Tsyganov	Soviet Union (URS)	2799.52
6	Maciej Gąsienica	Poland (POL)	2800.48

At the World Championships from 1954 through 1980, the combined was a "paper race" using the results of the three events (DH, GS, SL).

== Women's competitions ==
=== Downhill ===
Wednesday, 1 February

Place	Athlete	Nation	Time	Diff.
1st place, gold medalist(s)	Annemarie Moser-Pröll	Austria (AUT)	1:48.31	–
2nd place, silver medalist(s)	Irene Epple	West Germany (FRG)	1:48.55	+ 0.24
3rd place, bronze medalist(s)	Doris de Agostini	Switzerland (SUI)	1:49.11	+ 0.80
4	Marie-Theres Nadig	Switzerland (SUI)	1:49.64	+ 1.33
5	Cindy Nelson	United States (USA)	1:50.26	+ 1.95
6	Evi Mittermaier	West Germany (FRG)	1:50.42	+ 2.11
7	Brigitte Totschnig	Austria (AUT)	1:50.47	+ 2.16
8	Martina Ellmer	Austria (AUT)	1:50.89	+ 2.58
9	Irmgard Lukasser	Austria (AUT)	1:50.93	+ 2.62
10	Monika Bader	West Germany (FRG)	1:51.04	+ 2.73

=== Giant slalom ===
Saturday, 4 February

Place	Athlete	Nation	Time	Diff.	Run 1	Run 2
1st place, gold medalist(s)	Maria Epple	West Germany (FRG)	2:41.15	–	1:16.10	1:25.05
2nd place, silver medalist(s)	Lise-Marie Morerod	Switzerland (SUI)	2:41.20	+ 0.05	1:16.15	1:25.05
3rd place, bronze medalist(s)	Annemarie Moser-Pröll	Austria (AUT)	2:41.90	+ 0.75	1:16.85	1:25.05
4	Irene Epple	West Germany (FRG)	2:42.02	+ 0.87
5	Hanni Wenzel	Liechtenstein (LIE)	2:42.43	+ 1.28
6	Fabienne Serrat	France (FRA)	2:42.83	+ 1.68
7	Ursula Konzett	Liechtenstein (LIE)	2:42.84	+ 1.69
8	Perrine Pelen	France (FRA)	2:43.38	+ 2.23
9	Erika Hess	Switzerland (SUI)	2:44.25	+ 3.10
10	Christa Zechmeister	West Germany (FRG)	2:44.89	+ 3.74

This was the first two-run women's giant slalom at the World Championships.

=== Slalom ===
Friday, 3 February

Place	Athlete	Nation	Time	Diff.	Run 1	Run 2
1st place, gold medalist(s)	Lea Sölkner	Austria (AUT)	1:24.85	–	41.82	43.03
2nd place, silver medalist(s)	Pamela Behr	West Germany (FRG)	1:25.33	+ 0.48	42.03	43.30
3rd place, bronze medalist(s)	Monika Kaserer	Austria (AUT)	1:25.37	+ 0.52	42.39	42.98
4	Perrine Pelen	France (FRA)	1:25.67	+ 0.82
5	Fabienne Serrat	France (FRA)	1:25.75	+ 0.90
6	Hanni Wenzel	Liechtenstein (LIE)	1:26.09	+ 1.24
7	Lise-Marie Morerod	Switzerland (SUI)	1:26.59	+ 1.74
8	Claudia Giordani	Italy (ITA)	1:26.87	+ 2.02
9	Christa Zechmeister	West Germany (FRG)	1:26.99	+ 2.14
10	Regine Mösenlechner	West Germany (FRG)	1:27.43	+ 2.58

=== Combined ===
Place	Athlete	Nation	Points	DH	GS	SL
1st place, gold medalist(s)	Annemarie Moser-Pröll	Austria (AUT)	2460.39	1st place, gold medalist(s)	3rd place, bronze medalist(s)	19
2nd place, silver medalist(s)	Hanni Wenzel	Liechtenstein (LIE)	2476.80	29	5	6
3rd place, bronze medalist(s)	Fabienne Serrat	France (FRA)	2478.44		6	5
4	Kathy Kreiner	Canada (CAN)	2498.43	12	21	17
5	Dagmar Kuzmanová	Czechoslovakia (TCH)	2509.23
6	Cindy Nelson	United States (USA)	2511.63	5	15	30

At the World Championships from 1954 through 1980, the combined was a "paper race" using the results of the three events (DH, GS, SL).

== Medals Table ==
Place	Nation	Gold	Silver	Bronze	Total
1	Austria (AUT)	4	–	3	7
2	Sweden (SWE)	2	–	–	2
3	West Germany (FRG)	1	4	–	5
4	Liechtenstein (LIE)	1	2	2	5
5	Switzerland (SUI)	–	1	1	2
6	Italy (ITA)	–	1	–	1
7	France (FRA)	–	–	1	1
7	United States (USA)	–	–	1	1
