= Abbi Fisher =

American alpine skier

Personal information
- Born: August 20, 1957 (age 68) South Conway, New Hampshire, U.S.
- Height: 1.67 m (5 ft 6 in)

Skiing career
- Sport: Alpine skiing
- Retired: March 1982 (age 24)
- Disciplines: Slalom, giant slalom, downhill, combined
- World Cup debut: January 1975 (age 17)

Olympics
- Teams: 2 – (1976, 1980)
- Medals: 0

World Championships
- Teams: 4 – (1976–1982) includes two Olympics
- Medals: 0

World Cup
- Seasons: 8 – (1975–1982)
- Wins: 1 – (1 SL)
- Podiums: 3 – (1 SL, 2 GS)
- Overall titles: 0 – (14th in 1978)
- Discipline titles: 0 – (9th in SL, 1978)

Abigail E. "Abbi" Fisher-Gould (born August 30, 1957) is a former World Cup alpine ski racer from the United States. Born in South Conway, New Hampshire, she had one World Cup victory and three podiums. She suffered a knee injury in March 1979, at the pre-Olympic downhill at Lake Placid.

Fisher competed in the Winter Olympics in 1976 and 1980. She was unable to start in the slalom at the World Championships in 1978 due to an ankle injury. and was also named to the U.S. team in 1982.

Fisher married Frank Gould; they have two children and reside in the Sun Valley area in central Idaho.

== World Cup results ==
=== Season standings ===
Season	Age	Overall	Slalom	Giant Slalom	Super G	Downhill	Combined
1975	17	32	19	—	—N/a	—	
1976	18	27	22	16	—N/a	22	20
1977	19	17	14	5	—N/a	—	
1978	20	14	9	15	—N/a	—	
1979	21	27	13	29	—N/a	—	
1980	22	21	12	31	—N/a	—	—
1981	23	29	15	—	—N/a	—	15
1982	24	37	36	24	—N/a	—	8

(see scoring system)

=== Race podiums ===
- 1 victory – (1 SL)
- 3 podiums – (1 SL, 2 GS), 33 top tens

Season	Date	Location	Discipline	Place
1977	9 Dec 1976	Val-d'Isère, France	Giant slalom	2nd
1977	6 Mar 1977	(United States) Sun Valley, USA	Giant slalom	3rd
1979	10 Dec 1978	Piancavallo, Italy	Slalom	1st

== Olympic results ==
Year	Age	Slalom	Giant Slalom	Super-G	Downhill	Combined
1976	18	DNS2	—	—N/a	—	—N/a
1980	22	DNF2	—	—N/a	—	—N/a
