= Bartl =

Bartl is a given name and surname that may refer to:

== Surname ==
- Daniel Bartl (born 1989), Czech association football player
- Franz Bartl (1915–1941), Austrian field handball player
- Jiří Bartl (born 1963), Czech association football player and manager
- Leopold Bartl (1902–1980), German Wehrmacht officer during World War II
- Zlata Bartl (1920–2008), Bosnian Croat scientist

== Given name ==
- Bartl Gensbichler (born 1956), Austrian alpine skier
