= Pamela Behr =

German alpine ski racer

Personal information
- Born: 21 September 1956 (age 69) Hindelang, West Germany
- Height: 1.63 m (5 ft 4 in)

Skiing career
- Sport: Alpine skiing
- Retired: 1980 (age 23)
- Disciplines: Slalom, giant slalom, Downhill, Combined
- World Cup debut: 1971 (age 14)

Olympics
- Teams: 3 – (1972, 1976, 1980)
- Medals: 0 (0 gold)

World Championships
- Teams: 2 – (1974, 1978)
- Medals: 1 (0 gold)

World Cup
- Seasons: 10 - (1971-1980)
- Wins: 1
- Podiums: 5
- Overall titles: 0
- Discipline titles: 0
Medal record
Women's alpine skiing
Representing West Germany
World Championships
Silver medal – second place	1978 Garmisch	Slalom

Pamela Behr (born 21 September 1956 in Hindelang, West Germany) is a retired German alpine ski racer. She is the second youngest person ever to win an FIS Alpine Ski World Cup race, winning a slalom in Val d'Isere, France, in December 1972 at the age of 16 years, 79 days. It would be the only World Cup race win of her ten-year career. She won the silver medal in slalom at the FIS Alpine World Ski Championships 1978 in Garmisch-Partenkirchen.

== Skiing career ==
Behr made her debut on the World Cup circuit at the age of 14 in the 1971 season and scored her first World Cup points the next year, with three top-ten results during the 1972 season. These included second place in a slalom in Pra-Loup, France, in March 1972 at the age of 15 years, 178 days, the youngest ever to finish on a World Cup podium (top three).

She competed in three Winter Olympics, racing in all alpine skiing events during her Olympic debut in 1972 at age 15, finishing 6th in slalom, 25th in giant slalom, and 36th in downhill. She would place 5th in slalom at the 1976 Olympics, but failed to finish the slalom in her final Olympics in 1980.

Behr won the West German national championships a total of seven times between 1971 and 1979, six times in slalom and once in giant slalom.

=== World Cup podiums ===
Season	Date	Location	Discipline	Place	Age
1972	17 March 1972	(France) Pra-Loup	Slalom	2nd	15 years, 178 days
1973	9 December 1972	(France) Val d'Isere	Slalom	1st	16 years, 79 days
1973	2 January 1973	(Socialist Federal Republic of Yugoslavia) Maribor	Slalom	2nd	16 years, 103 days
1976	17 December 1975	(Italy) Cortina d'Ampezzo	Slalom	2nd	19 years, 87 days
1977	19 January 1977	(Austria) Schruns	Slalom	3rd	20 years, 120 days

=== World Championships medals ===
Season	Date	Location	Discipline	Place	Age
1978	3 February 1978	(West Germany) Garmisch-Partenkirchen	Slalom	Silver	21 years, 135 days

== Personal life ==
Pamela Behr is the daughter of Sepp Behr, an alpine ski racer who also won seven West German national championships titles in slalom, giant slalom, and combined from 1954 to 1962. She is married to Christian Knauth, the marketing and communications director of the FIS (International Ski Federation).
