= Sepp Ferstl =

German alpine skier (born 1954)

Personal information
- Born: 6 April 1954 (age 72) Vogling-Siegsdorf, Traunstein, Bavaria, West Germany
- Height: 1.78 m (5 ft 10 in)

Skiing career
- Sport: Alpine skiing
- Club: SC Hammer
- Retired: March 1980 (age 25)
- Disciplines: Downhill, Combined
- World Cup debut: 26 January 1974 (age 19)

Olympics
- Teams: 2 – (1976, 1980)
- Medals: 0

World Championships
- Teams: 4 – (1974–1980) includes two Olympics
- Medals: 1 (0 gold)

World Cup
- Seasons: 7 – (1974–1980)
- Wins: 3 – (2 DH, 1 K)
- Podiums: 6 – (4 DH, 2 K)
- Overall titles: 0 – (11th in 1977)
- Discipline titles: 0 – (5th in DH, 1978)
Medal record
Men's alpine skiing
Representing West Germany
World Cup race podiums
Event	1st	2nd	3rd
Downhill	2	2	0
Combined	1	0	1
Total	3	2	1
World Championships
Silver medal – second place	1978 Garmisch-Partenkrchen	Combined

Josef Ferstl Sr., known as Sepp Ferstl, (born 6 April 1954) is a retired German World Cup alpine ski racer who won the Hahnenkamm, the world's most prestigious downhill race, in consecutive years (1978, 1979). He made his World Cup debut at the race in 1974 at age 19, and won a silver medal at the World Championships in 1978 in the combined.

== Biography ==
Born in Traunstein, Bavaria, he competed for West Germany at the Winter Olympics in 1976 and 1980, and is the father of German alpine racer Josef Ferstl Jr.

== World Cup results ==
=== Season standings ===
Season	Age	Overall	Slalom	Giant Slalom	Super G	Downhill	Combined
1974	19	49	—	—	not run	21	not awarded
1975	20	41	—	—	not run	—	not awarded
1976	21	38	—	—	not run	21	9
1977	22	11	—	—	not run	6	not awarded
1978	23	14	—	—	not run	5	not awarded
1979	24	27	—	—	not run	8	not awarded
1980	25	37	—	—	not run	20	15

Points were only awarded for top ten finishes (see scoring system).

=== Race podiums ===
- 3 wins – (2 DH, 1 K)
- 6 podiums – (4 DH, 2 K); 24 top tens – (16 DH, 8 SG)

Season	Date	Location	Discipline	Place
1977	22 January 1977	Wengen, Switzerland	Downhill	2nd
1977	23 January 1977	Wengen, Switzerland	Combined	3rd
1977	18 February 1977	Laax, Switzerland	Combined	1st
1977	18 February 1977	Laax, Switzerland	Downhill	2nd
1978	21 January 1978	Kitzbühel, Austria	Downhill	1st
1979	20 January 1979	Kitzbühel, Austria	Downhill	1st

== World championship results ==
Year	Age	Slalom	Giant Slalom	Super-G	Downhill	Combined
1974	19	—	—	not run	11	—
1976	21	20	28	not run	17	9
1978	23	29	31	not run	4	2
1980	25	25	34	not run	—	—

From 1948 through 1980, the Winter Olympics were also the World Championships for alpine skiing.
At the World Championships from 1954 through 1980, the combined was a "paper race" using the results of the three events (DH, GS, SL).

== Olympic results ==
Year	Age	Slalom	Giant Slalom	Super-G	Downhill	Combined
1976	21	20	28	not run	17	not run
1980	25	25	34	not run	—	not run
