= Franz Klammer =

Austrian alpine skier

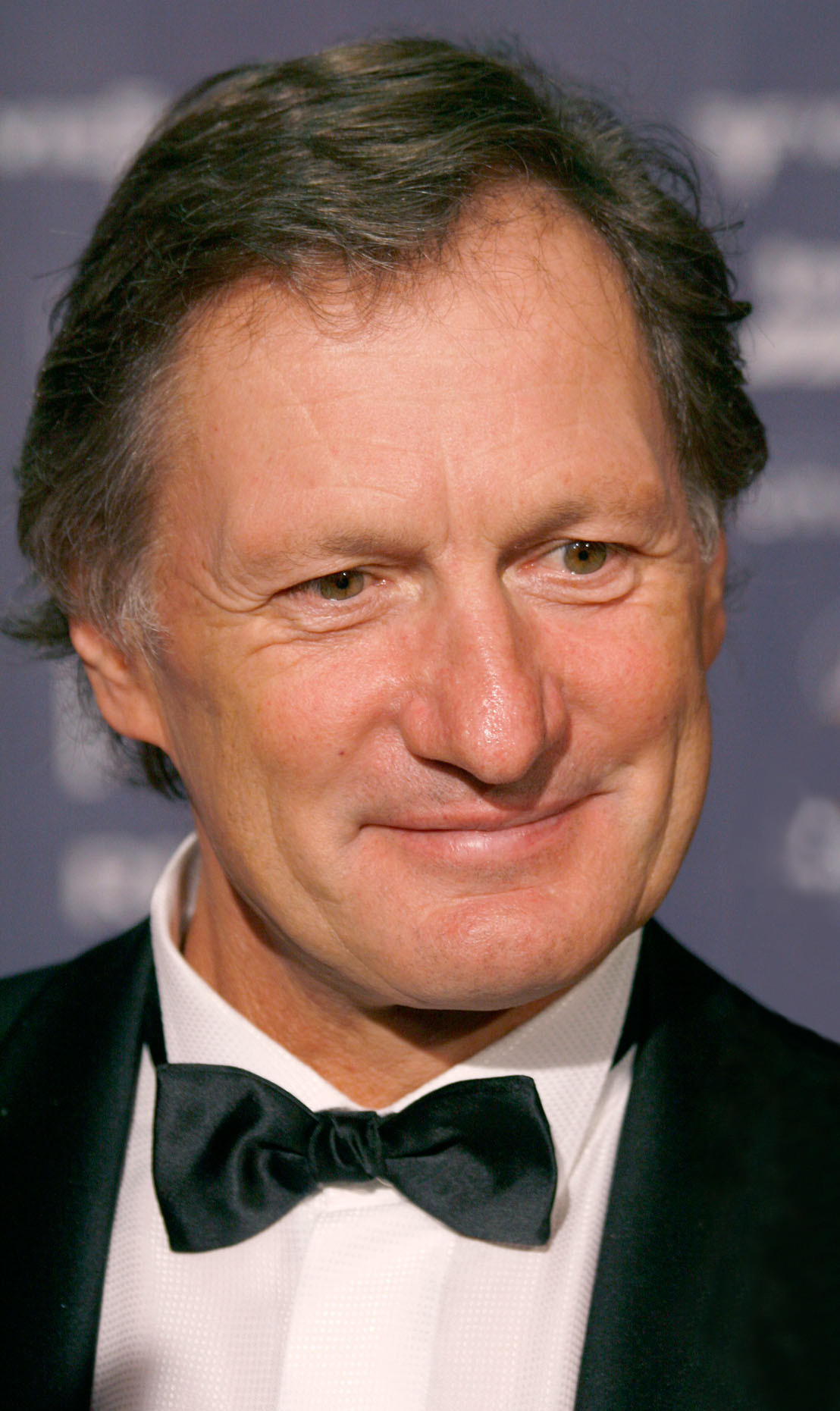
- Klammer in 2009

Personal information
- Born: 3 December 1953 (age 72) Mooswald, Carinthia, Austria
- Height: 1.83 m (6 ft 0 in)

Skiing career
- Sport: Alpine skiing
- Retired: March 1985 (age 31)
- Disciplines: Downhill, giant slalom, combined
- World Cup debut: December 1972 (age 19)

Olympics
- Teams: 2 – (1976, 1984)
- Medals: 1 (1 gold)

World Championships
- Teams: 5 – (1974–85) includes 1976 Olympics
- Medals: 3 (2 gold)

World Cup
- Seasons: 13 – (1973–85)
- Wins: 26 – (25 DH, 1 K)
- Podiums: 45 – (41 DH, 1 GS, 3 K)
- Overall titles: 0 – (3rd in 1975, 1977)
- Discipline titles: 5 – (5 DH: 1975–78, 1983)
Medal record
Alpine skiing
Representing Austria
World Cup race podiums
Event	1st	2nd	3rd
Downhill	25	10	6
Giant	0	0	1
Combined	1	0	2
Total	26	10	9
Olympic Games
Gold medal – first place	1976 Innsbruck	Downhill
World Championships
Gold medal – first place	1974 St. Moritz	Combined
Gold medal – first place	1976 Innsbruck	Downhill
Silver medal – second place	1974 St. Moritz	Downhill

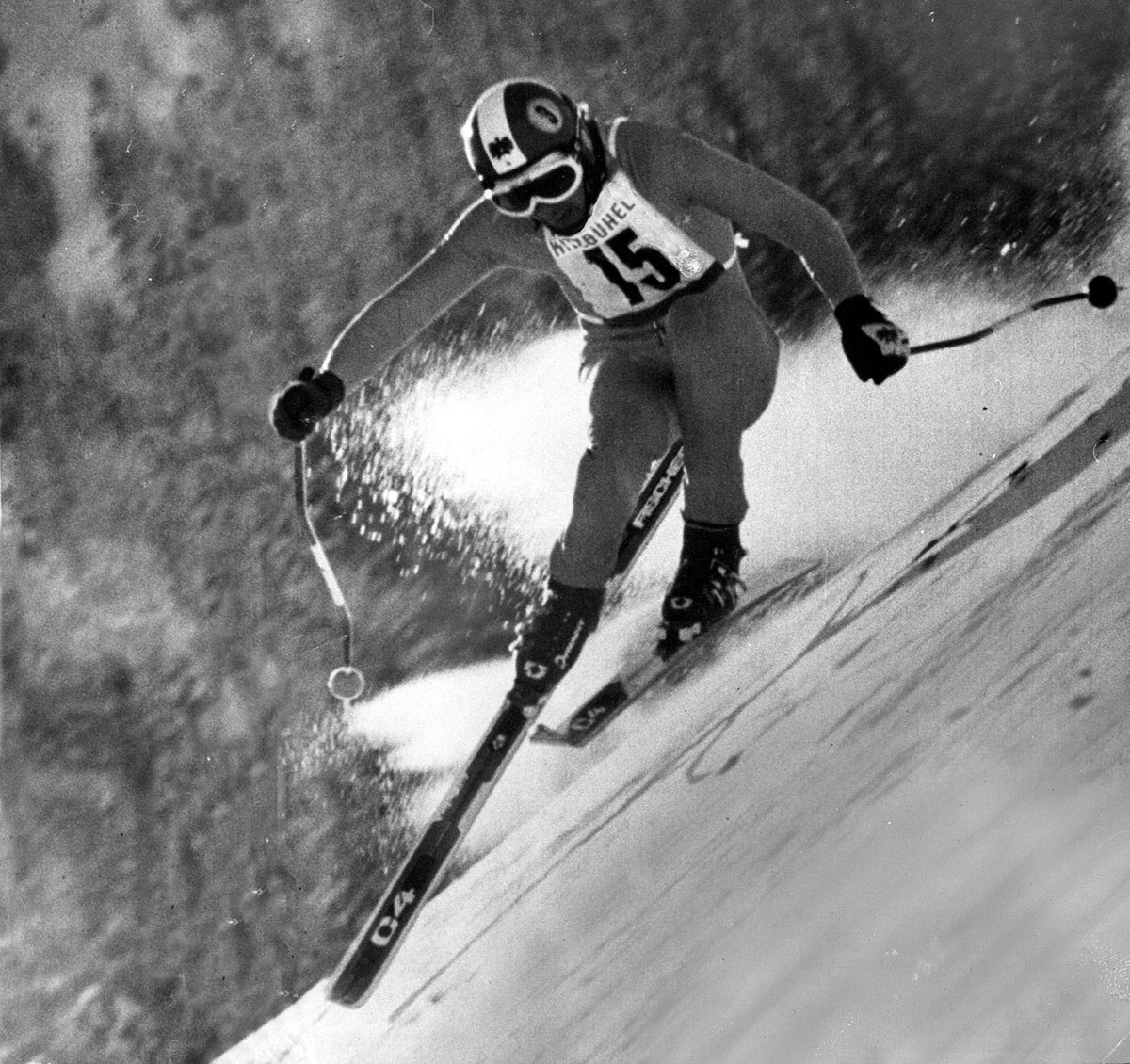
Klammer winning at Kitzbühel in 1976

Franz Klammer (born 3 December 1953) is a former champion alpine ski racer from Austria. He established an unprecedented period of dominance in the downhill event for four consecutive World Cup seasons (1975–78). He was the gold medalist at the 1976 Winter Olympics in Innsbruck, winning the downhill at Patscherkofel by a margin of 0.33 seconds with a time of 1:45.73 against Bernhard Russi of Switzerland. Klammer won 25 World Cup downhills, including four on the Hahnenkamm at Kitzbühel. He also holds the record for the most victories (four) on the full course at Kitzbühel.

== Background ==
Klammer was born into a farming family in Mooswald, a community Fresach, Carinthia; like many alpine farm boys, he skied to school each winter day. His home village did not have any ski lifts, so as a child he climbed up the pasture behind his house to ski downhill. Klammer started racing at the age of 14, competing in the winter whilst working on the family farm during the summer after he dropped out of school. He had a tough struggle to make the Austrian ski team, which traditionally was dominated by the states of Tyrol and Salzburg. He made his World Cup debut at the age of 19 in 1972 at the Val Gardena downhill: he finished ninth in the training run for the race, but could only manage 32nd place on race day due to nerves. He spent 13 seasons on the World Cup circuit, from December 1972 to March 1985.

Klammer has been married to his wife, Eva, since 1979: the couple met in 1975 when he was in Tunisia at a fitness camp with the Austrian ski team. They have two daughters, Sophie and Stephanie.

== Career ==
Klammer first showed signs of promise in the second half of the 1973 World Cup season, finishing second in the St. Anton downhill behind Bernhard Russi of Switzerland, the reigning Olympic and World Cup downhill champion. Klammer, aged 19, followed this up with a third at St. Moritz and a third in the giant slalom at Mont Sainte-Anne (the only time he finished on the podium in a World Cup giant slalom in his career). The following season he finished second in the downhill standings behind Roland Collombin of Switzerland. Klammer beat Collombin and Russi at Schladming in December 1973 under terrible conditions, but Collombin bested him at Garmisch, Avoriaz and Wengen.

Klammer won every downhill in the 1975 season, except Megève, where one of his skis came off. Without this incident, he would have won the overall World Cup title in March 1975, due to a good slalom result two days earlier at Chamonix, which would have granted him at least a third place (15 points) for the AK-combined of slalom Chamonix / downhill Megève. In the Olympic test event at Patscherkofel at Innsbruck in January 1975, Klammer had defeated defending Olympic champion Bernhard Russi of Switzerland, the runner-up, by nearly a half-second.

Entering the 1976 Winter Olympics, the 22-year-old Klammer was the favourite to take the gold medal in the downhill at Innsbruck in his native Austria. He was the defending World Cup downhill champion and had won the three previous downhills in January at Wengen, Morzine and Kitzbühel, and also the previous year's race on the same Patscherkofel course. Starting in 15th position, Klammer was the last of the top seeds and knew that Bernhard Russi had set a blistering pace to lead by over a half-second. Klammer took heavy risks on the treacherous piste, skied on the edge of disaster and won by 0.33 seconds to the delight of the Austrian fans. A dozen years earlier on the same course in 1964, Egon Zimmermann posted a 2:18.16 to win the gold medal. Klammer's 1:45.73 was more than thirty-two seconds faster.

Although he dominated the downhill event in World Cup competition, the overall title remained elusive, because the technical specialists had two events in which to earn points (slalom and giant slalom), whereas a speed specialist had only one. The second speed event, the super-G, was not a World Cup event until December 1982, at the twilight of Klammer's World Cup career.

At the end of the 1975 season, despite having won eight of nine downhills, Klammer finished third for the overall World Cup title. The final event was a parallel slalom and Klammer lost in the first round. Italy's Gustav Thöni defeated Sweden's Ingemar Stenmark in the finals and won his fourth overall title in five years. Klammer finished fourth overall in 1976, third in 1977, and fifth in 1978.

Klammer won the World Cup downhill title five times: 1975, 1976, 1977, 1978 and 1983 – twice more than the next best downhiller. In the 1975 season he won 8 of 9 World Cup downhill races, including his first of three consecutive victories (1975–77) on the prestigious Streif on the Hahnenkamm at Kitzbühel. He won a fourth in 1984, at the age of 30.

After his fourth consecutive season title in downhill in 1978, Klammer began a prolonged slump until the end of the 1981 season. He may have been affected by his brother's spinal cord injury in a downhill race, as well as a change of ski supplier (from Fischer to Kneissl).

Unable to make the four-member Austrian downhill team for the 1980 Olympics, Klammer could not defend his Olympic title at the 1980 Winter Olympics in Lake Placid. Rather than retire, he worked long and hard at a comeback. Finally in December 1981, after another ski change from Kneissl to Blizzard, he won at Val-d'Isère. The following season he regained the World Cup Downhill title, his fifth, followed by the 1984 victory at Kitzbuehel, his fourth on the Hahnenkamm. At the 1984 Olympics in Sarajevo, (then Yugoslavia, now Bosnia), Klammer finished a disappointing tenth on a less-than-challenging course on Bjelašnica.

At his peak (Wengen 1976 to Wengen 1977), Klammer won ten consecutive downhills, including the pressure-laden win at the 1976 Olympics. He won 8 of 9 during the 1975 season and also won 19 of 23, 20 of 26 and 21 of 29 downhills. His career total is 26 downhill wins: 25 World Cup and one Olympic. These achievements mark him as one of the greatest downhill racers ever: Karl Schranz achieved 20 wins over an extended career while Klammer won 19 in less than three seasons.

In an interview with Austrian television in 2006, the 52-year-old Klammer was asked about his greatest achievement. He answered that although his gold medal at the Olympic Games in Innsbruck was generally regarded as his greatest career achievement, winning at Kitzbühel in 1984 meant something very special to him, considering that he had not won there for seven years.

Klammer's final World Cup race was in March 1985 at Aspen, Colorado. He retired from international competition at the age of 31.
Klammer finished with 26 World Cup victories, 45 podiums and 87 top-ten finishes (71 downhill, five combined, 11 giant slalom).

== Motor racing ==
Immediately after his retirement from alpine competition, Klammer took up motor racing, and was soon involved in touring car racing, driving Mercedes-Benz saloons all over Europe and racing professionally as far away as Australia. In 1986, he won his class in a round of the prestigious European Touring Car Championship.

== Legacy ==
Klammer is known by his nicknames "The Kaiser" and the "Klammer Express".

In a 2015 interview with Graham Bell for The Daily Telegraph, Klammer attributed his success to being the first downhiller to carve a whole turn from start to finish, contrasting his style with skiers of the previous generation such as Karl Schranz and Jean-Claude Killy who would skid at the start of a turn before engaging in a carve.

In an interview with Tom Brokaw that aired on NBC on 13 February 2010, as part of their 2010 Winter Olympics coverage, American Olympian Bode Miller cited Klammer's style and approach to ski racing as a major source of inspiration for him.

Inspired by his younger brother Klaus, who was paralysed from the waist down after a crash in a downhill at the age of 16, Klammer has established the Franz Klammer Foundation, which benefits seriously injured athletes.

== World Cup results ==
=== Season titles ===
Season	Discipline
1975	Downhill
1976	Downhill
1977	Downhill
1978	Downhill
1983	Downhill

=== Season standings ===
Season	Age	Overall	Slalom	Giant slalom	Super G	Downhill	Combined
1973	19	8	—	9	not run	4	not awarded
1974	20	5	—	10	not run	2	not awarded
1975	21	3	—	9	not run	1	not awarded
1976	22	4	—	—	not run	1	4
1977	23	3	—	—	not run	1	not awarded
1978	24	5	—	—	not run	1	not awarded
1979	25	51	—	—	not run	19	not awarded
1980	26	33	—	—	not run	11	—
1981	27	40	—	—	not run	13	—
1982	28	14	—	—	not run	5	—
1983	29	18	—	—	not awarded	1	—
1984	30	20	—	—	not awarded	4	—
1985	31	52	—	—	not awarded	16	—

=== Race victories ===
- 26 wins - (25 downhill, 1 combined)

Season	Date	Location	Discipline
1974	22 Dec 1973	Schladming, Austria	Downhill
1975	8 Dec 1974	Val-d'Isère, France	Downhill
1975	15 Dec 1974	St. Moritz, Switzerland	Downhill
1975	5 Jan 1975	Garmisch, West Germany	Downhill
1975	11 Jan 1975	Wengen, Switzerland	Downhill
1975	18 Jan 1975	Kitzbühel, Austria	Downhill
1975	26 Jan 1975	Innsbruck, Austria	Downhill
1975	9 Mar 1975	(United States) Jackson Hole, USA	Downhill
1975	21 Mar 1975	Val Gardena, Italy	Downhill
1976	12 Dec 1975	Madonna di Campiglio, Italy	Downhill
1976	10 Jan 1976	Wengen, Switzerland	Downhill
1976	11 Jan 1976	Wengen, Switzerland	Combined
1976	17 Jan 1976	Morzine, France	Downhill
1976	25 Jan 1976	Kitzbühel, Austria	Downhill
1976	12 Mar 1976	(United States) Aspen, USA	Downhill
1977	17 Dec 1976	Val Gardena, Italy	Downhill
1977	18 Dec 1976	Val Gardena, Italy	Downhill
1977	8 Jan 1977	Garmisch, West Germany	Downhill
1977	15 Jan 1977	Kitzbühel, Austria	Downhill
1977	22 Jan 1977	Wengen, Switzerland	Downhill
1977	18 Feb 1977	; Laax, Switzerland	Downhill
1978	11 Dec 1977	Val-d'Isère, France	Downhill
1978	11 Mar 1978	Laax, Switzerland	Downhill
1982	6 Dec 1981	Val-d'Isère, France	Downhill
1983	20 Dec 1982	Val Gardena, Italy	Downhill
1984	21 Jan 1984	Kitzbühel, Austria	Downhill

== World championship results ==
Year	Age	Slalom	Giant slalom	Super-G	Downhill	Combined
1974	20	20	10	not run	2	1
1976	22	—	DNF1	not run	1	—
1978	24	—	—	not run	5	—
1980	26	—	—	not run	—^	—
1982	28	—	—	not run	7	—
1985	31	—	—	not run	5	—

From 1948 through 1980, the Winter Olympics were also the World Championships for alpine skiing.
At the World Championships from 1954 through 1980, the combined was a "paper race" using the results of the three events (DH, GS, SL).

== Olympic results ==
Year	Age	Slalom	Giant slalom	Super-G	Downhill	Combined
1976	22	—	DNF1	not run	1	not run
1980	26	—	—	not run	—^	not run
1984	30	—	—	not run	10	not run

^ Klammer was an alternate on the 1980 team and did not compete.

== Video ==
- Video - Olympics - 05-Feb-1976 on YouTube
- Full 1976 Olympic Run on YouTube
