= Mauro Bernardi =

Italian alpine skier (born 1957)

Personal information
- Born: 11 August 1957 Bolzano, Italy
- Height: 1.65 m (5 ft 5 in)

Skiing career
- Sport: Alpine skiing
- Retired: 1980
- World Cup debut: 1977

World Cup
- Seasons: 4
- Wins: 0
- Podiums: 2
- Overall titles: 0 (best 10th 1978)

Mauro Bernardi (born 11 August 1957) is an Italian former alpine skier who competed in the 1980 Winter Olympics. He closed 10th in overall in 1978 Alpine Skiing World Cup.

== World Cup podiums ==
Date	Place	Discipline	Rank
09-01-1978	(Germany) Zwiesel	Slalom	2nd
15-01-1978	(Switzerland) Wengen	Slalom	3rd

== See also ==
- Italian skiers who closed in top 10 in overall World Cup
