= Peter Fischer (skier) =

German alpine skier (born 1954)

Peter Fischer (born 25 February 1954 in Oberstdorf) is a German former alpine skier who competed in the 1976 Winter Olympics, finishing 15th in the men's downhill.
