= Bartl Gensbichler =

Austrian alpine skier (born 1956)

Bartl Gensbichler (born 9 September 1956 in Saalbach-Hinterglemm) is an Austrian retired alpine skier. He finished 11th overall in the Men's Downhill in the 1976–77 FIS Alpine Ski World Cup.
