= Kiehl's =

USA based cosmetics retailer

Kiehl's LLC
- Type: Subsidiary
- Industry: Personal care
- Founded: 1851; 175 years ago
- Founder: John Kiehl
- Headquarters: 3rd Avenue, Manhattan, New York City
- Area served: Worldwide
- Key people: Aaron Morse; Irving Morse; Jami Morse Heidegger
- Products: Cosmetics
- Parent: L'Oréal
- Website: kiehls.com

Kiehl's LLC is an American cosmetics brand retailer that specializes in skin, hair, and body care products. It started as a single pharmacy in Manhattan at Third Avenue and East 13th Street in 1851. Kiehl's was purchased by the L'Oréal Group in 2000 and has 65 stores in the United States and 400 stores worldwide as of 2015, with over 1,000 points of sale supplemented by sales in department stores, select airport locations, as well as independent stockists. In contrast to its market competitors, Kiehl's is distinguished for its unorthodox marketing approach, exceptionally large male clientele base, and its products' simple and straightforward packaging.

== History ==
=== Foundation ===
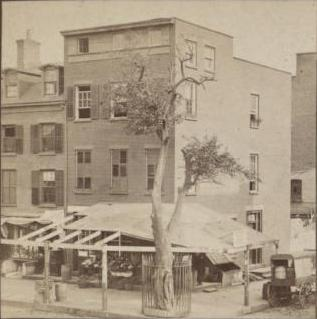
The corner of Third and East 13th Street, known as "Pear Tree Corner," in what is now the East Village of Manhattan circa 1900, where Kiehl's has been located since its founding in 1851.

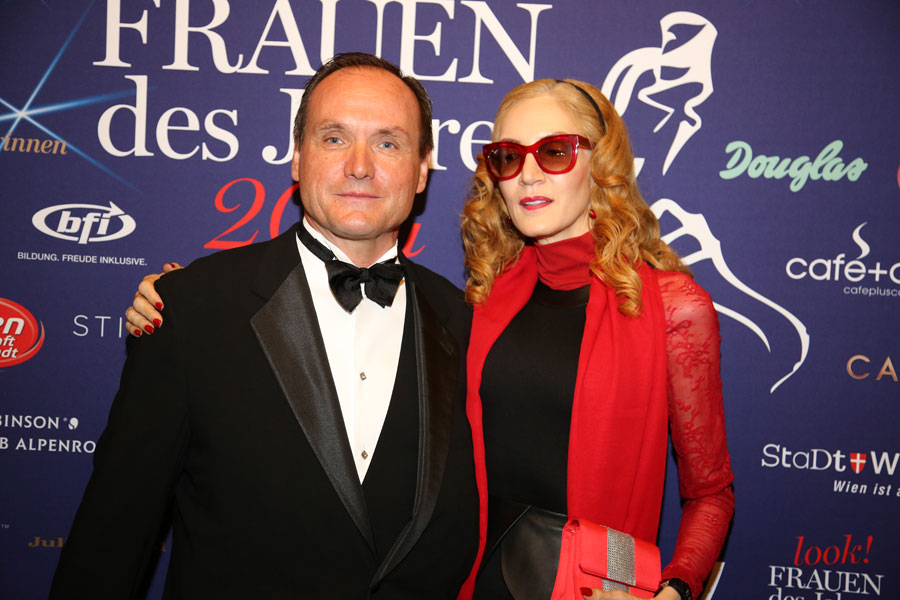
Kiehl's current president: Klaus Heidegger, and ex-president: Jami Morse Heidegger in 2014.

Founded in 1851 by John Kiehl, Kiehl's began as a homeopathic pharmacy located in New York City's East Village: 3rd Avenue and 13th Street. In 1921 Irving Morse, a former apprentice and Russian Jewish émigré who had studied pharmacology at Columbia University, purchased the store. Morse was involved in developing many of Kiehl's products that are still popular today; including Blue Astringent Herbal Lotion and Creme de Corps.

Irving's son, Aaron Morse, who also studied pharmacology at Columbia University and was a former World War II pilot, took over the store in the 1960s. The younger Morse was credited for propelling Kiehl's from obscurity in the 1950s to international recognition in the 1980s as an upscale natural cosmetics shop. Aaron transitioned the store from traditional pharmaceuticals towards skin care lines. After Aaron's death in 1995, his desk and some of his vintage motorcycles were prominently showcased in the store.

From 1988 to 2000, Jami Morse Heidegger, Aaron's daughter, operated Kiehl's. Maintaining Kiehl's as a single store, but selling their products through high-end retail stores, Morse Heidegger increased Kiehl's revenue to $40 million. Morse Heidegger achieved this growth by being "a clever marketer", relying on word of mouth and extensive free samples - and gifts - to market Kiehl's products, rather than traditional advertising.

=== Acquisition by L'Oréal ===
In April 2000, L'Oréal, the French beauty and cosmetics company, acquired Kiehl's for between $100–$150 million. L'Oréal had pursued the purchase of the company for more than two years but the catalyst for a deal came when Kiehl's had difficulty handling the growing volume of orders due to the company's increased popularity. Morse Heidegger, then president of Kiehl's, said, "We took a long hard look at the situation, and we felt that in order to keep up with the demand, in order to not be out of stock, in order to fulfil our destiny, if you will, we needed to take on a partner."

With the purchase, L'Oréal stated it planned to "increase the brand's presence but maintain it as a luxury line rather than a mass-market one." Kiehl's would also be expanded internationally and Morse Heidegger would step down as president. Kiehl's newly appointed president is Michelle Taylor.

== Business ==
=== Stores ===
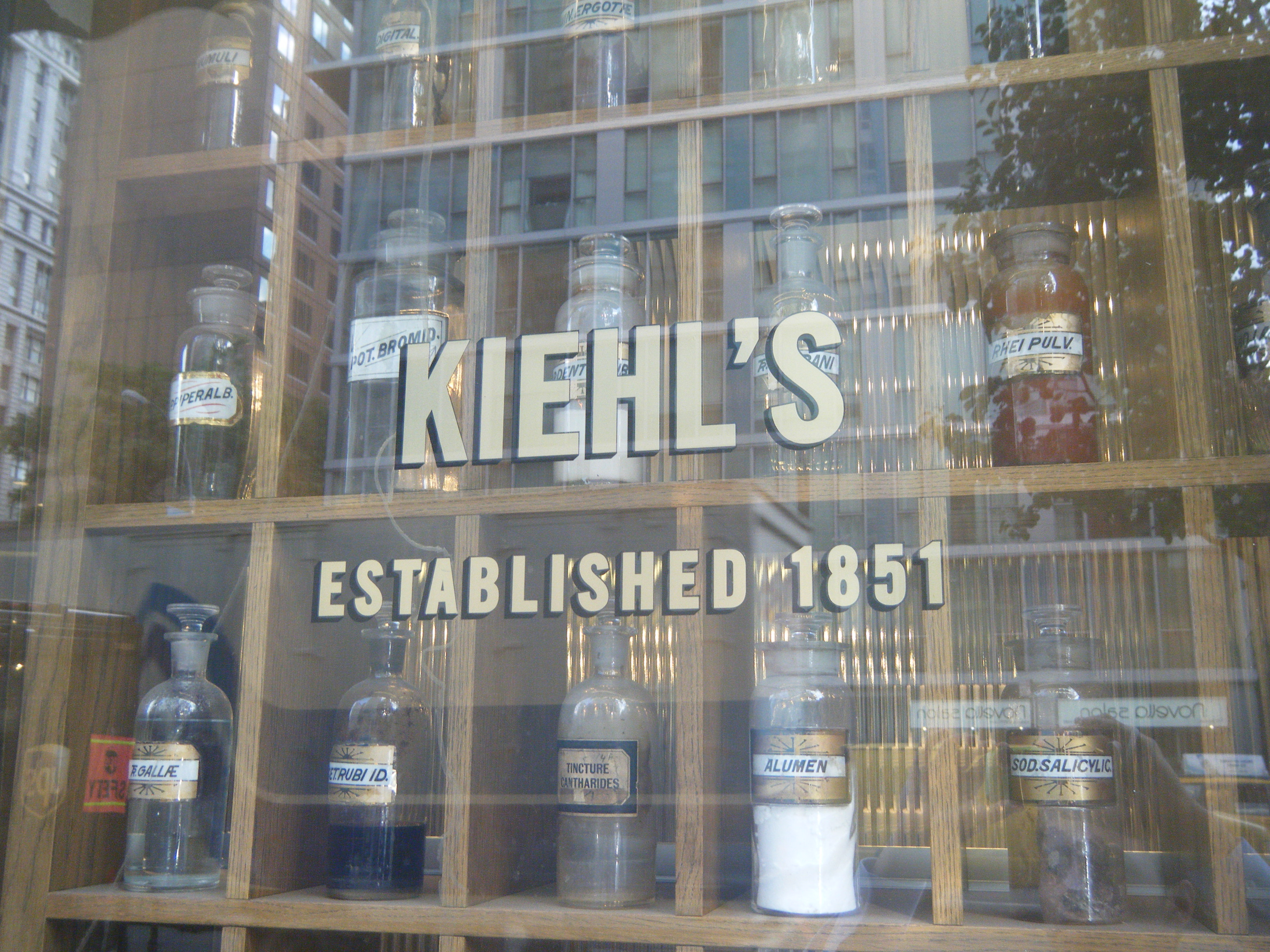
Vintage druggist relics displayed in the storefront window of Kiehl's original pharmacy

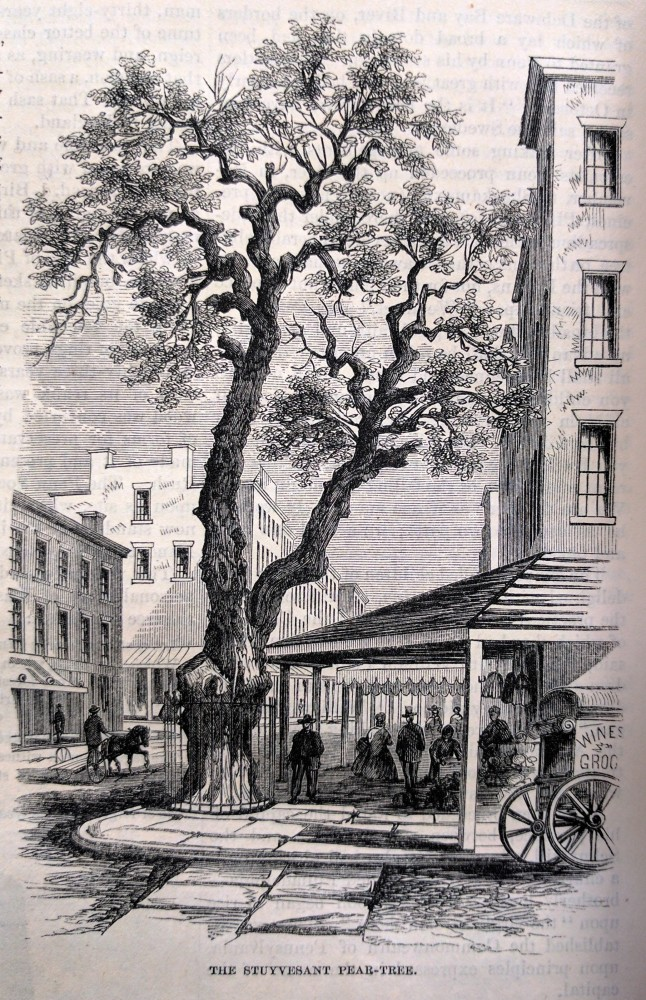
The Stuyvesant Pear Tree

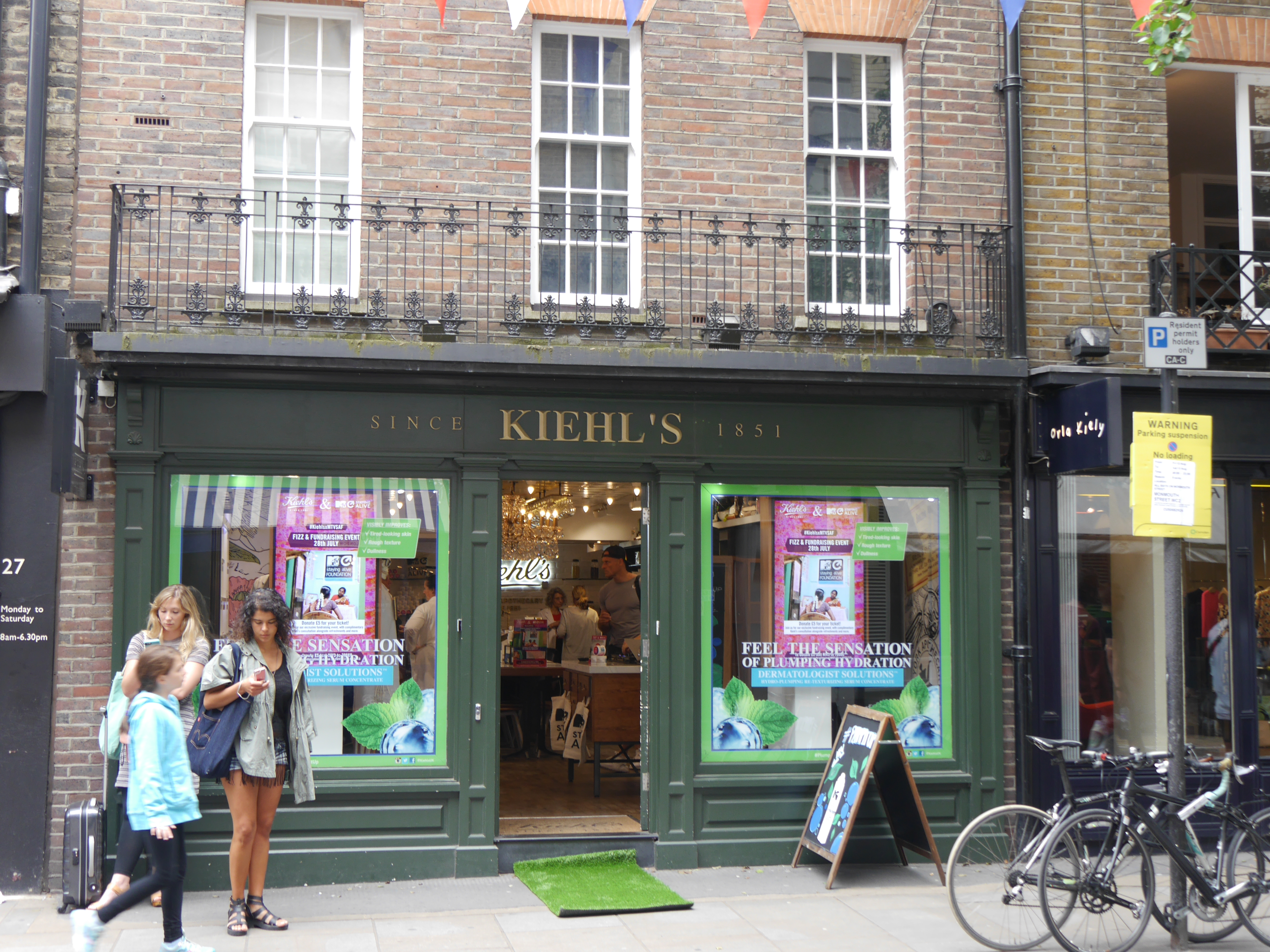
Kiehl's, Monmouth Street, Covent Garden, London

For the first 150 years of the company, Kiehl's operated only one store, with its products also selling in numerous department stores. Following its acquisition by L'Oréal, the company expanded from its one Manhattan flagship store to more than 30 stores. Kiehl's sales have also more than quadrupled, increasing from $40 million in 2000 to over $200 million in 2009. In 2016, Kiehl's sales reached $1 billion.

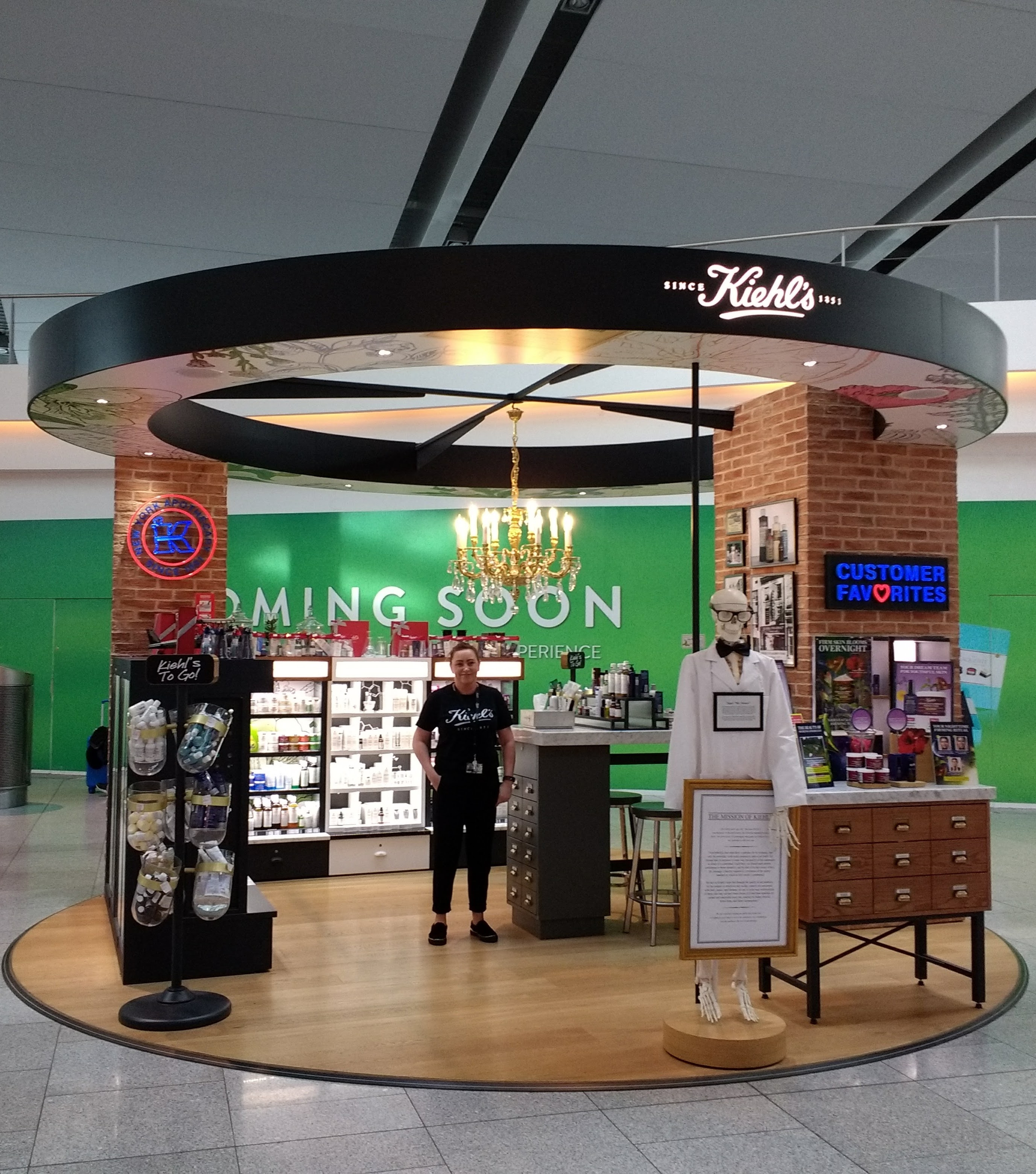
A Kiehl's kiosk at Terminal 2 in the Dublin Airport.

=== The Stuyvesant Pear Tree ===
Kiehl's original store, located at 3rd Avenue and 13th Street in the East Village of Manhattan, occupies the same space as when it was founded in 1851. The site of Kiehl's location is known as "Pear Tree Corner" for the pear tree Peter Stuyvesant, governor of the Dutch colony New Amsterdam, planted there in 1667. A wagon collision felled the tree in 1867; it was then known as "the oldest living thing in the city of New York." In November 2003, Kiehl's initiated the replanting of a new pear tree in its spot. Today, the store has evolved into a neighborhood institution; Frommer's 2010 New York City travel guide states "Kiehl's is more than a store, it's a virtual cult." Distinguishing features of the store include its window display of vintage druggist relics, and the collection of classic Harley-Davidson and Indian motorcycles housed within its doors. In 2022, Kiehl's revamped the original 170 year old flagship store to pay tribute to its history and growth throughout the years, with a new campaign called "We Skincare About You Since 1851".

=== Products and sales ===
Kiehl's merchandise is "priced at the lower end of prestige skin care" while being distinguished for its "simple and straightforward packing which speaks to the old apothecary concept."

To market its products, Kiehl's applies a non-traditional marketing approach that "relies heavily on free product samples, word of mouth endorsements from existing customers, and innovative marketing techniques." Particularly known for its generous sampling policy, "Kiehl's gave away more than 12 million samples a year, which represents 80 percent of their total marketing budget" according to Lynn Upshaw in Truth: The New Rules for Marketing in a Skeptical World. Upshaw writes, "The Kiehl's way of 'selling' is not to sell at all. They believe the products will do what they do and no hype will change that." Donations, most prominently in charity event gift bags, also attract customers.

On a local store level, Kiehl's works to understand each new location and develop a unique approach for that market. For example, for the opening a new store in New York's Upper West Side, Kiehl's supported improvements to a local playground in Central Park, a hot community topic at the time. Within the stores, Kiehl's is known for its focus on customer service and its "retail brand experience." Their lab-coated staff undergoes an "intensive four-week residency schooling that thoroughly educates them in the chemistry, use and application of Kiehl's products."

=== Clientele ===
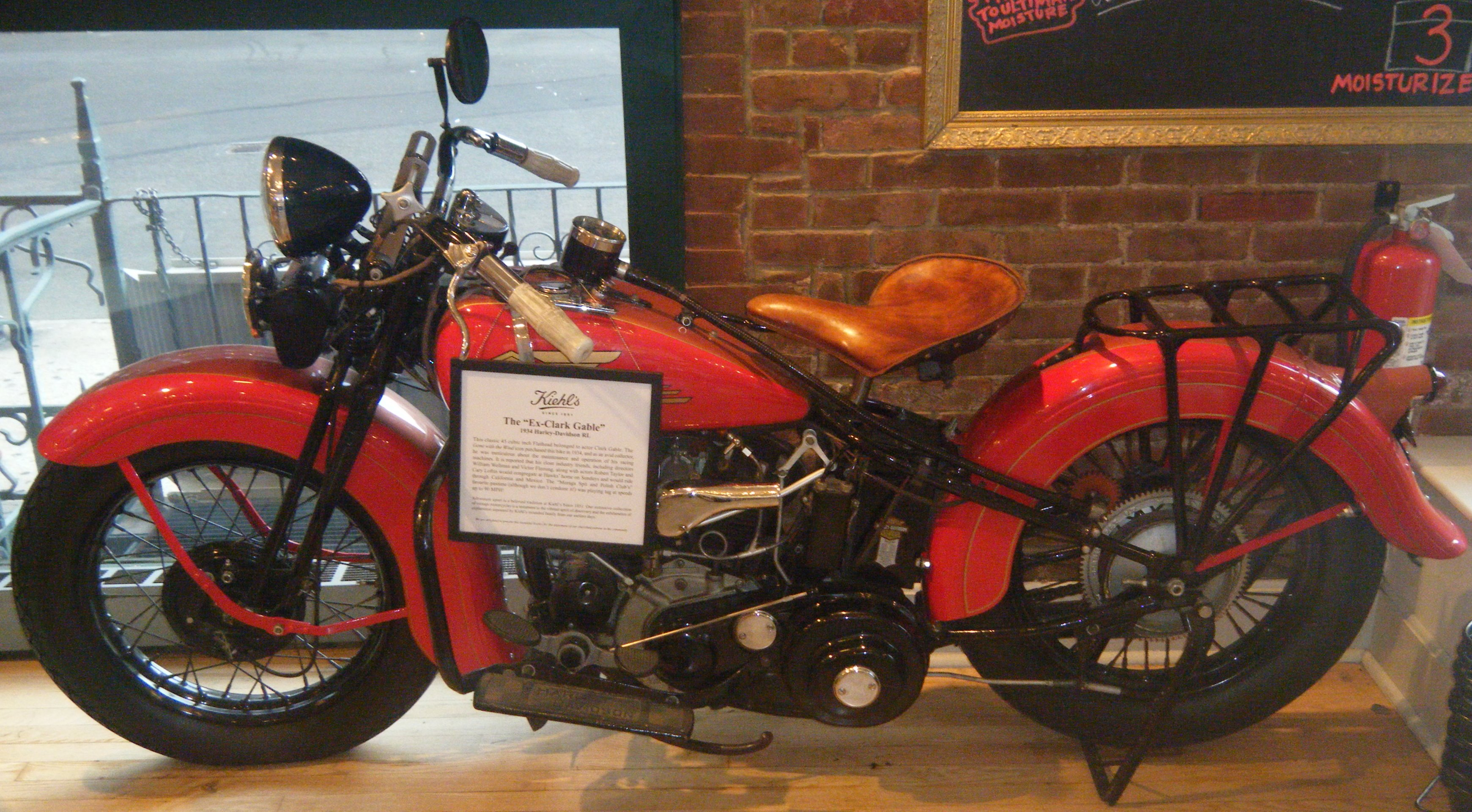
A classic 1934 Harley Davidson RL motorcycle previously owned by American film actor Clark Gable displayed in Kiehl's flagship store. Kiehl's vintage motorcycles, numbering more than 100, are displayed around the world.

Allan Mottus, the editor of the cosmetics industry magazine The Informationist, stated, "The Kiehl's store always attracted a cutting-edge younger crowd." Compared to other cosmetics stores, Kiehl's is also known for appealing to an exceptionally large male clientele, which represents 30 to 40 percent of the company's customer base. The interior of every Kiehl's store includes a motorcycle, paying homage to the fleet of 44 motorcycles Aaron Morse had in its collection. According to Kiehl's USA president, Chris Salgrado, the motorcycles were an effective way of introducing male customers to their products. In cities like New York and Los Angeles, nearly half of all customers are men. According to Wendy Liebmann, chief executive of New York research firm WSL Strategic Retail, "Kiehl's changes the paradigm with a health and wellness approach that demystifies cosmetics. There's no intimidating hocus-pocus. It feels authentic and fun."

=== Philanthropy ===
Kiehl's is recognized for its philanthropic activities. More than 40 years ago, Aaron Morse wrote the "Mission of Kiehl's," a 137-word statement which committed the company to the objective of "making for better citizens, better firms, and better communities." Today, the cosmetics retailer is focused on three primary philanthropic causes: AIDS research and prevention, children's well-being and the environment. Kiehl's stores have also begun to regularly host pet adoption events. In August 2010, the company launched its inaugural "Kiehl's Liferide for amfAR" (The Foundation for AIDS Research). At the end of the six-day charitable motorcycle ride up the coast of California, Chris Salgardo, the President of Kiehl's USA who led the group on his own Harley-Davidson, presented an $85,000 check to amfAR.

=== Controversy ===
Kiehl's has been criticized for using squalene, an ingredient derived from shark liver, in their skincare products. However, both Kiehl's and independent foundations affirm Kiehl's employs squalene sourced from olives in their products.

In 2025, Kiehl’s introduced its Personals intimate-care line with advertisements featuring models with visible pubic hair. After some of the ads were censored in stores and on social media, the company launched a follow-up campaign called “Pubic Display Type,” which used a custom font made from human pubic hair. The initiative was described as both a challenge to beauty norms and a controversial publicity tactic.
