= Alois Morgenstern =

Austrian alpine skier (born 1954)

Alois Morgenstern (born 13 June 1954 in Spittal an der Drau) is an Austrian former alpine skier who competed in the 1976 Winter Olympics.
