= Ernst Winkler =

Austrian alpine skier

Personal information
- Born: 11 March 1955 (age 71) Schwarzach im Pongau, Austria

Skiing career
- Sport: Alpine skiing
- Retired: 1980
- Disciplines: Speed events
- World Cup debut: 1975

World Cup
- Seasons: 6
- Podiums: 4
Medal record
Men's alpine skiing
Representing Austria
World Cup race podiums
Event	1st	2nd	3rd
Giant slalom	0	2	2

Ernst Winkler (born 11 March 1955) is a former Austrian alpine skier.

== Career ==
During his career he has achieved 14 results among the top 10 (4 podiums) in the World Cup.

== World Cup results ==
Podiums

Date	Place	Discipline	Rank
13 March 1977	(United States) Heavenly Valley	Downhill	2
30 January 1977	(France) Morzine	Downhill	3
8 January 1977	(Germany) Garmisch-Partenkirchen	Downhill	2
12 March 1976	(United States) Aspen	Downhill	3
