= Christian Hemmi =

Swiss alpine skier

Personal information
- Born: 23 August 1954 (age 71) Churwalden, Switzerland

Skiing career
- Sport: Alpine skiing
- Retired: 1978
- Disciplines: Technical events
- World Cup debut: 1977

World Cup
- Seasons: 2
- Podiums: 3
Medal record
Men's alpine skiing
Representing Switzerland
World Cup race podiums
Event	1st	2nd	3rd
Giant slalom	0	2	1

Christian Hemmi (born 23 August 1954) is a former Swiss alpine skier.

He is the brother of Heini Hemmi.

== Career ==
During his career he has achieved 3 results among the top 3 in the World Cup.

== World Cup results ==
Top 3

Date	Place	Discipline	Rank
25 March 1977	(Spain) Sierra Nevada	Giant slalom	3
6 March 1977	(United States) Sun Valley	Giant slalom	2
2 January 1977	(Switzerland) Ebnat-Kappel	Giant slalom	2
