= Lise-Marie Morerod =

Swiss alpine skier

Lise Marie Morerod
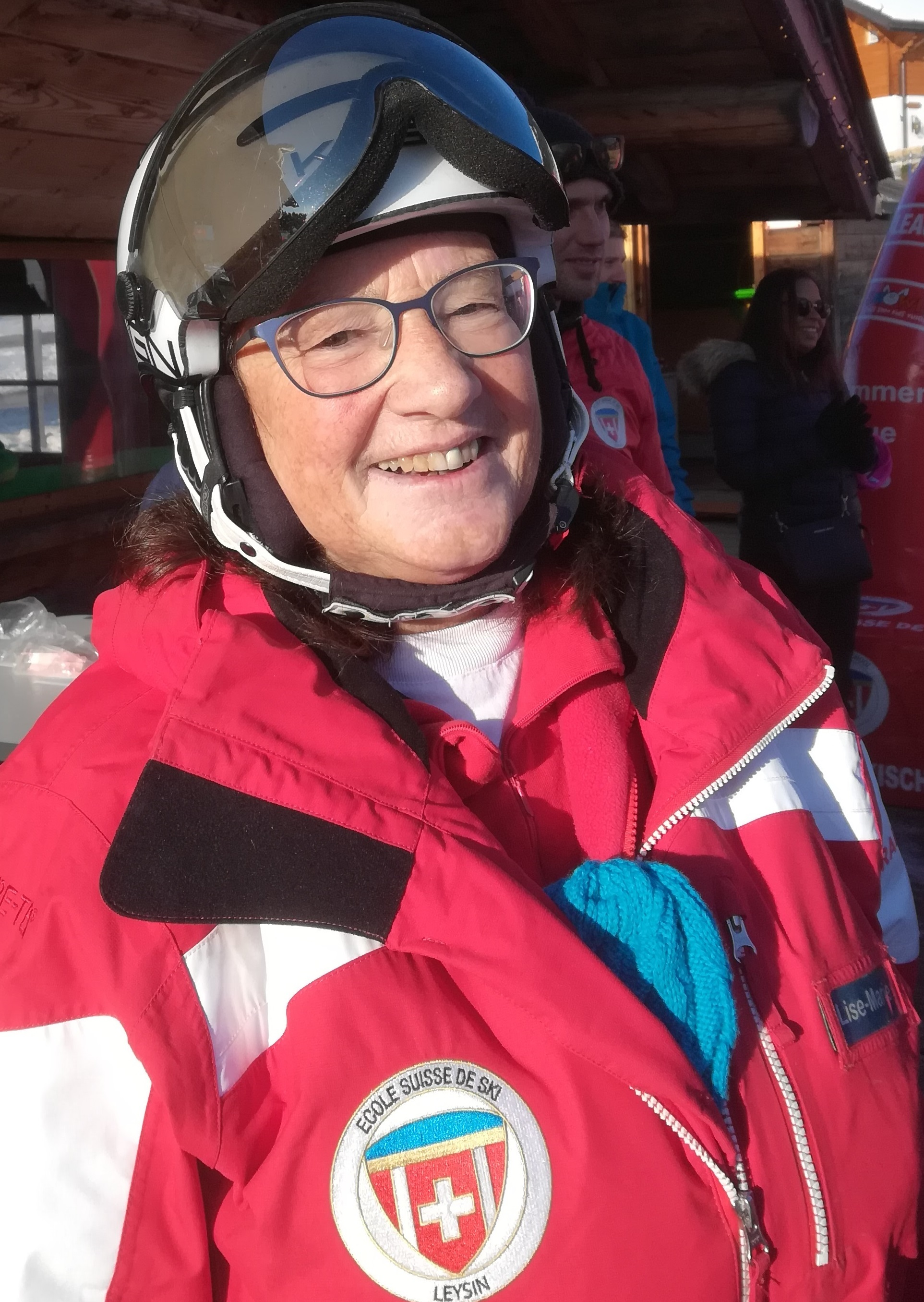

Personal information
- Born: 16 April 1956 (age 70) Les Diablerets, Switzerland

Skiing career
- Sport: Alpine skiing
- Retired: 1980
- Disciplines: Technical events
- World Cup debut: 1973

Olympics
- Teams: 1

World Championships
- Teams: 2
- Medals: 2

World Cup
- Seasons: 8
- Wins: 24
- Podiums: 41
- Overall titles: 1
- Discipline titles: 5
Medal record
Men's alpine skiing
Representing Switzerland
World Cup race podiums
Event	1st	2nd	3rd
Slalom	10	3	2
Giant slalom	14	6	4
Combined	0	2	0
Total	24	11	6
International competitions
Event	1st	2nd	3rd
World Championships	0	1	1
Junior World Championships	0	1	0
Total	0	2	1
World Championships
Silver medal – second place	1978 Garmisch	Giant slalom
Bronze medal – third place	1974 St. Moritz	Slalom

Lise-Marie Morerod (born 16 April 1956) is a Swiss former slalom skier. In 1977, she was women's overall season champion.

== Biography ==
She born in Les Diablerets, Vaud. In 1972, at age 15, she became Swiss champion in giant slalom. Her winning the bronze medal in the slalom race at the FIS Alpine Skiing World Championships was a great surprise because she was an unknown racer. (Best racers wear bib numbers between 1 and 15; she had 39.) It was the only medal won by the Swiss racers at their "Home World Championships". At the 1976 Winter Olympics, she took fourth place in the giant slalom but didn't finish the slalom race. She achieved 24 victories and another 17 podiums in World Cup races and was the first Swiss racer to win the Overall World Cup.

A car accident in July 1978 left Morerod in a coma for six weeks and led to a six-month hospital stay. The injuries she sustained in the accident left her with long-term memory problems. She returned to the World Cup in 1979, but failed to find her previous form and did not qualify for the 1980 Winter Olympics. She retired after the 1979–80 season.

== World Cup victories ==
=== Overall ===
Season	Discipline
1975	Giant slalom
1975	Slalom
1976	Giant slalom
1977	Overall
1977	Giant slalom
1977	Slalom

== Individual races ==
Date	Location	Race
4 January 1975	(West Germany) Garmisch-Partenkirchen	Slalom
29 January 1975	(France) Saint-Gervais	Slalom
13 March 1975	(United States) Sun Valley	Giant slalom
20 March 1975	(Italy) Val Gardena	Slalom
4 December 1975	(France) Val-d'Isère	Giant slalom
11 December 1975	(Italy) Aprica	Slalom
12 January 1976	(France) Les Diablerets	Slalom
15 January 1976	(France) Les Gets	Giant slalom
25 January 1976	(Slovenia) Kranjska Gora	Giant slalom
26 January 1976	(Slovenia) Kranjska Gora	Slalom
13 March 1976	(United States) Aspen	Giant slalom
9 December 1976	(France) Val-d'Isère	Giant slalom
16 December 1976	(Italy) Cortina d'Ampezzo	Slalom
3 January 1977	(West Germany) Oberstaufen	Slalom
19 January 1977	(Austria) Schruns	Slalom
20 January 1977	(Switzerland) Arosa	Giant slalom
2 February 1977	(Slovenia) Maribor	Giant slalom
6 March 1977	(United States) Sun Valley	Giant slalom
24 March 1977	(Spain) Sierra Nevada	Giant slalom
8 December 1977	(France) Val-d'Isère	Giant slalom
9 January 1978	(Switzerland) Les Mosses	Giant slalom
19 January 1978	(Austria) Bad Gastein	Slalom
9 February 1978	(France) Megève	Giant slalom
7 March 1978	(United States) Waterville Valley	Giant slalom

Awards and achievements
Preceded by (Switzerland) Karin Iten	Swiss Sportswoman of the Year; 1974 – 1975	Succeeded by (Switzerland) Christine Stückelberger
Preceded by (Switzerland) Christine Stückelberger	Swiss Sportswoman of the Year; 1977	Succeeded by (Switzerland) Cornelia Bürki
