= Heini Hemmi =

Swiss alpine skier

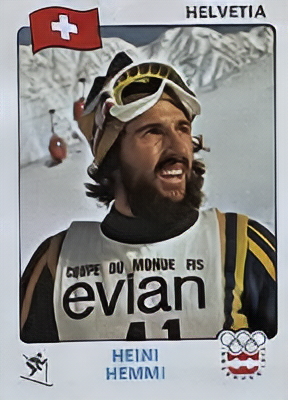

Personal information
- Born: 17 January 1949 (age 77) Churwalden, Switzerland

Skiing career
- Sport: Alpine skiing
- Retired: 1979
- Disciplines: Technical events
- World Cup debut: 1970

Olympics
- Teams: 1
- Medals: 1 (1 gold)

World Championships
- Teams: 2
- Medals: 1 (1 gold)

World Cup
- Seasons: 11
- Wins: 4
- Podiums: 13
Medal record
Men's alpine skiing
Representing Switzerland
World Cup race podiums
Event	1st	2nd	3rd
Giant slalom	4	7	2
International competitions
Event	1st	2nd	3rd
Olympic Games	1	0	0
World Championships	1	0	0
Total	2	0	0
Olympic Games
Gold medal – first place	1976 Innsbruck	Giant slalom
World Championships
Gold medal – first place	1976 Innsbruck	Giant slalom

Heini Hemmi (born 17 January 1949) is a Swiss former alpine skier, winner of the giant slalom competition at the 1976 Winter Olympics. He also won the Giant slalom World Cup 1976-77.

He is the older brother of Christian Hemmi, who was on the podium thrice in the 1976–77 World Cup.

== World Cup victories ==
Date	Location	Race
18 March 1976	(Canada) Mont Sainte-Anne	Giant slalom
12 December 1976	(Italy) Val-d'Isère	Giant slalom
2 January 1977	(Switzerland) Ebnat-Kappel	Giant slalom
24 January 1977	(Switzerland) Adelboden	Giant slalom

Awards
Preceded by (Switzerland) Rolf Bernhard	Swiss Sportsman of the Year; 1976	Succeeded by (Switzerland) Michel Broillet
