= Monika Bader =

German alpine skier (born 1959)

Monika Bader (born 9 March 1959 in Trauchgau) is a retired German alpine skier who competed in the 1980 Winter Olympics, placing 21st in the women's downhill.
