= Klaus Heidegger =

Austrian alpine skier

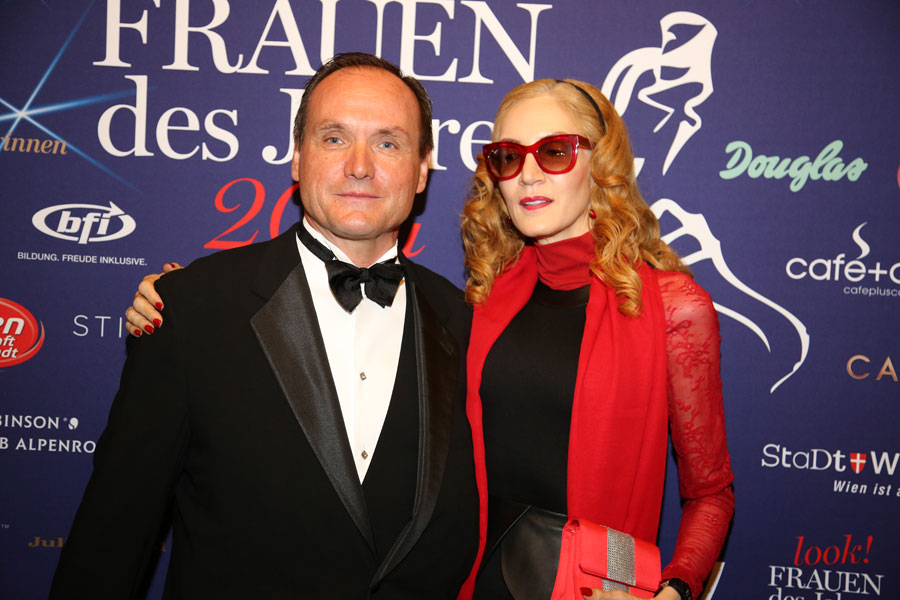
- Klaus Heidegger and wife Jami Morse Heidegger in 2014

Personal information
- Born: 19 August 1957 (age 68) Götzens, Austria

Skiing career
- Sport: Alpine skiing
- Retired: 1986
- Disciplines: Technical events
- World Cup debut: 1978

World Cup
- Seasons: 9
- Wins: 5
- Podiums: 14
Medal record
Men's alpine skiing
Representing Austria
World Cup race podiums
Event	1st	2nd	3rd
Slalom	3	4	2
Giant slalom	2	1	2
Total	5	5	4

Klaus Heidegger (born 19 August 1957) is an Austrian former alpine skier.

== Career ==
He had five victories on the FIS World Cup circuit. These were the giant slalom at Garmisch-Partenkirchen, the slalom at Furano, and the giant slalom at Voss, all in 1977, and the slalom events at Wengen and Kitzbühel, both in 1978. Heidegger finished second overall in the 1977 World Cup standings, behind Ingemar Stenmark of Sweden.

Following his skiing career, Heidegger has served as co-president of the American cosmetic company Kiehl's, which was sold to L'Oreal for an estimated price of $100 million to $150 million in 2000. Klaus Heidegger is also a co-founder of Masai Group International, provider of MBT Physiological Footwear, which received an investment from Berkshire Partners in 2007.

Heidegger is married to Jami Morse Heidegger. His son Max is a professional basketball player in the Israeli Basketball Premier League.
