= Evi Mittermaier =

German alpine skier

Personal information
- Born: 16 February 1953 (age 73) Munich, West Germany
- Height: 5.35 ft (163 cm)

Skiing career
- Sport: Alpine skiing ♀
- Retired: 1980
- Disciplines: downhill, giant slalom, combined

Olympics
- Teams: 2 (1976, 1980)

World Cup
- Wins: 2
- Podiums: 7

Evi Mittermaier (born 16 February 1953, Munich) is a German former alpine skier who competed in the 1976 Winter Olympics and 1980 Winter Olympics. She won two World Cup races and attained 7 podiums.

== Biography ==
She is the younger sister of double Olympic Champion, World Champion and World Cup winning alpine skier Rosi Mittermaier, sister in law of slalom specialist Christian Neureuther and aunt of world gold medalist Felix Neureuther. According to David Coleman who was commentating her sister Rosi's entry in the 1976 Winter Olympics in Innsbruck, she used to live in a hotel.

== Career ==
Evi was a speed specialist and won two World Cup downhill races, one on 16. December 1975 in Cortina d’Ampezzo and one on 18. January 1978 in Bad Gastein. She also had finished seven times on the podium.

== Music career ==
The sisters recorded two albums of Bavarian folk music together.
