= Michael Veith =

German alpine skier (born 1957)

Michael Veith (born 20 January 1957 in Tegernsee) is a German former alpine skier who competed in the 1976 Winter Olympics and 1980 Winter Olympics.
