= Alpine skiing at the 1972 Winter Olympics – Men's giant slalom =

Men's giant slalom at the XI Olympic Winter Games
- Alpine skiing
- Venue: Teine
- Date: February 9–10, 1972
- Competitors: 73 from 27 nations
- Winning time: 3:09.62

Medalists
1st place, gold medalist(s)		Gustav Thöni	Italy
2nd place, silver medalist(s)		Edmund Bruggmann	Switzerland
3rd place, bronze medalist(s)		Werner Mattle	Switzerland

Men's Giant Slalom
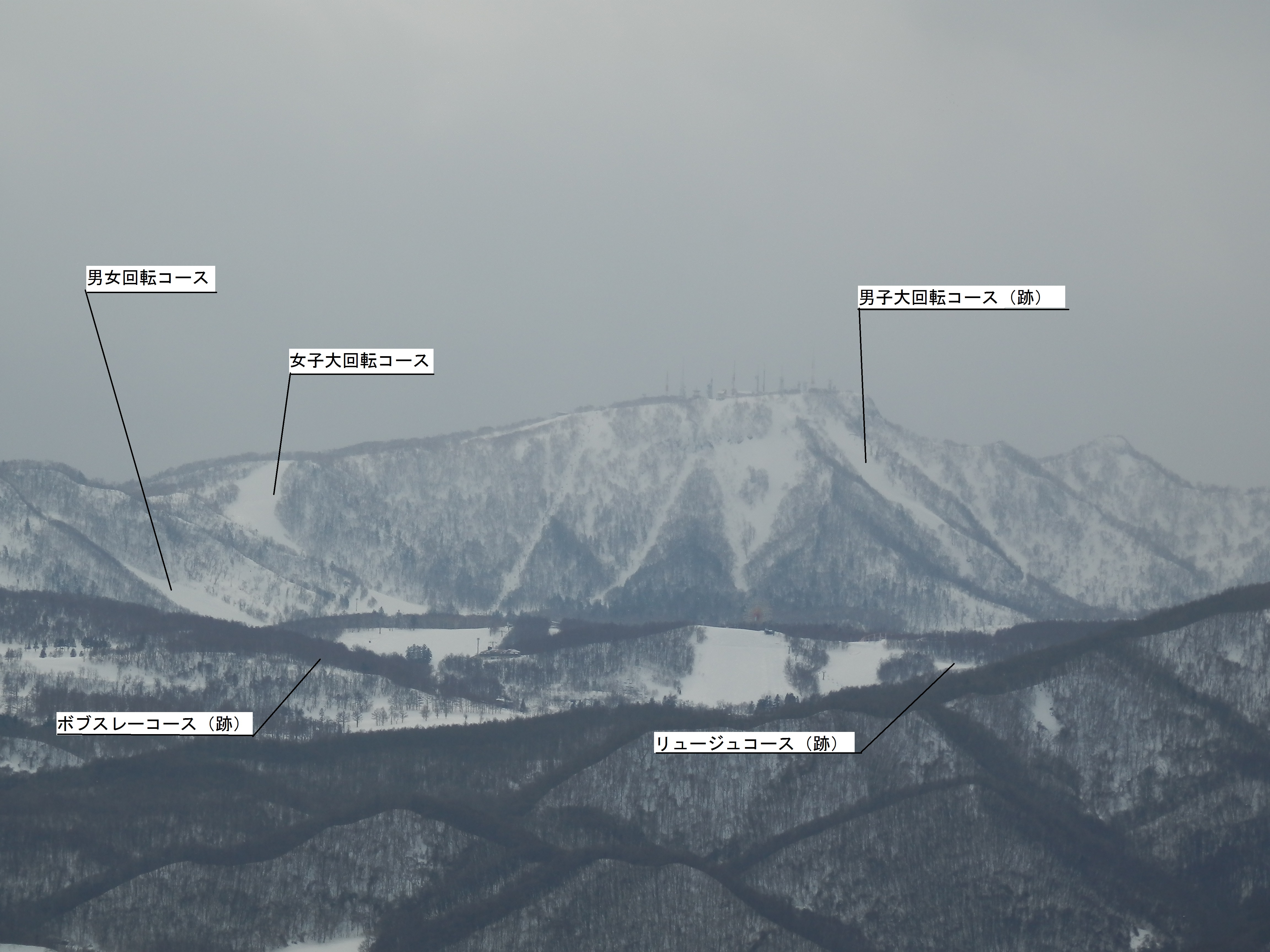
- Location: Teine
- Vertical: 402 m (1,319 ft)
- Top elevation: 952 m (3,123 ft)
- Base elevation: 550 m (1,804 ft)

Locations on Hokkaido

The Men's giant slalom competition of the Sapporo 1972 Olympics was held at Teine on Wednesday, February 9, and Thursday, February 10.

The defending world champion was Karl Schranz of Austria, who was barred from competing in the Olympics. Italy's Gustav Thöni was the defending World Cup giant slalom co-champion (with France's Patrick Russel) and led the 1972 World Cup.

== Results ==
Both of the runs started at 13:30 JST (UTC+9) under clear skies. The air temperature was −11 °C (12 °F) for the first run on Wednesday and −9 °C (16 °F) for the second on Thursday.

Rank	Bib	Name	Country	Run 1	Run 2	Total	Difference
1st place, gold medalist(s)	9	Gustav Thöni	Italy	1:32.19	1:37.43	3:09.62	—
2nd place, silver medalist(s)	14	Edmund Bruggmann	Switzerland	1:33.43	1:37.32	3:10.75	+1.13
3rd place, bronze medalist(s)	11	Werner Mattle	Switzerland	1:33.44	1:37.55	3:10.99	+1.37
4	4	Alfred Hagn	West Germany	1:31.78	1:39.38	3:11.16	+1.54
5	10	Jean-Noël Augert	France	1:33.61	1:38.23	3:11.84	+2.22
6	30	Max Rieger	West Germany	1:33.86	1:38.08	3:11.94	+2.32
7	7	David Zwilling	Austria	1:32.34	1:39.98	3:12.32	+2.70
8	8	Reinhard Tritscher	Austria	1:32.51	1:39.88	3:12.39	+2.77
9	19	Alain Penz	France	1:33.36	1:39.06	3:12.42	+2.80
9	12	Andrzej Bachleda	Poland	1:34.40	1:38.02	3:12.42	+2.80
11	18	Jim Hunter	Canada	1:33.83	1:39.15	3:12.98	+3.36
12	29	Josef Loidl	Austria	1:36.26	1:38.39	3:14.65	+5.03
13	3	Eberardo Schmalzl	Italy	1:34.22	1:40.50	3:14.72	+5.10
14	22	Walter Tresch	Switzerland	1:35.86	1:38.89	3:14.75	+5.13
15	41	Masami Ichimura	Japan	1:35.77	1:39.57	3:15.34	+5.72
16	28	Helmuth Schmalzl	Italy	1:35.72	1:39.63	3:15.35	+5.73
17	33	Bob Cochran	United States	1:35.39	1:40.15	3:15.54	+5.92
18	2	Werner Bleiner	Austria	1:34.18	1:41.78	3:15.96	+6.34
19	39	Haruhisa Chiba	Japan	1:36.36	1:40.87	3:17.23	+7.61
20	17	Reto Barrington	Canada	1:35.22	1:42.02	3:17.24	+7.62
21	23	Hank Kashiwa	United States	1:37.42	1:40.71	3:18.13	+8.51
22	31	Willi Frommelt	Liechtenstein	1:35.71	1:42.94	3:18.65	+9.03
23	36	Peik Christensen	Norway	1:38.27	1:40.42	3:18.69	+9.07
24	40	Herbert Marxer	Liechtenstein	1:38.13	1:41.57	3:19.70	+10.08
25	42	Aurelio García	Spain	1:37.28	1:42.45	3:19.73	+10.11
26	53	Dan Cristea	Romania	1:37.93	1:41.95	3:19.88	+10.26
27	27	Rolando Thoeni	Italy	1:35.83	1:44.90	3:20.73	+11.11
28	21	Sven Mikaelsson	Sweden	1:37.88	1:43.77	3:21.65	+12.03
29	26	Malcolm Milne	Australia	1:37.94	1:44.26	3:22.20	+12.58
30	20	Rick Chaffee	United States	1:39.23	1:45.09	3:24.32	+14.70
31	34	Marko Kavčič	Yugoslavia	1:39.01	1:46.08	3:25.09	+15.47
32	49	Chris Womersley	New Zealand	1:42.00	1:45.56	3:27.33	+17.71
33	54	Virgil Brenci	Romania	1:42.81	1:44.59	3:27.40	+17.78
34	51	Robert Blanchaer	Belgium	1:43.59	1:45.79	3:29.38	+19.76
35	47	Ivan Penev	Bulgaria	1:41.77	1:48.78	3:30.78	+21.16
36	32	Steven Clifford	Australia	1:44.75	1:49.50	3:34.25	+24.63
37	50	Resmi Resmiev	Bulgaria	1:45.68	1:54.14	3:39.82	+30.20
38	63	Jorge-Emilio Lazzarini	Argentina	1:48.72	1:54.96	3:43.68	+34.06
39	66	Spyros Theodorou	Greece	1:58.41	2:03.86	4:02.27	+52.65
40	58	Fayzollah Band Ali	Iran	1:55.72	2:08.42	4:04.14	+54.52
41	59	Panagiotis Alexandris	Greece	2:03.05	2:02.40	4:05.45	+55.83
42	69	Ben Nanasca	Philippines	1:54.59	2:11.61	4:06.20	+56.58
43	73	Lotfollah Kia Shemshaki	Iran	2:07.26	1:58.95	4:06.21	+56.59
44	67	Ali Saveh	Iran	2:08.05	1:58.83	4:06.88	+57.26
45	60	Ghassan Keyrouz	Lebanon	2:05.10	2:11.20	4:16.30	+66.68
46	68	Georgios Tambouris	Greece	2:10.38	2:08.31	4:18.69	+69.07
47	72	Wang Cheng-che	Republic of China	2:15.80	2:19.83	4:35.63	+86.01
48	70	Hwang Wei-chung	Republic of China	2:11.29	2:29.58	4:40.87	+91.25
-	15	Erik Håker	Norway	1:31.70	DNF	-	-
-	5	Christian Neureuther	West Germany	1:33.24	DNF	-	-
-	16	Adolf Rösti	Switzerland	1:33.27	DQ	-	-
-	6	Roger Rossat-Mignod	France	1:33.28	DQ	-	-
-	38	Masahiko Otsue	Japan	1:38.71	DQ	-	-
-	65	Sergey Grishchenko	Soviet Union	1:42.00	DNF	-	-
-	57	Royston Varley	Great Britain	1:43.00	DNF	-	-
-	52	Carlos Perner	Argentina	1:44.00	DNF	-	-
-	46	Iain Finlayson	Great Britain	1:45.88	DNF	-	-
-	25	Otto Tschudi	Norway	1:57.42	DQ	-	-
-	71	Juan Cipriano	Philippines	1:58.00	DNF	-	-
-	24	Francisco Fernández Ochoa	Spain	DQ	-	-	-
-	45	Masayoshi Kashiwagi	Japan	DQ	-	-	-
-	37	Derek Robbins	Canada	DQ	-	-	-
-	35	Olle Rolén	Sweden	DNF	-	-	-
-	44	Manni Thofte	Sweden	DNF	-	-	-
-	1	Sepp Heckelmiller	West Germany	DNF	-	-	-
-	13	Henri Duvillard	France	DNF	-	-	-
-	43	David Currier	United States	DNF	-	-	-
-	55	Konrad Bartelski	Great Britain	DNF	-	-	-
-	48	Ross Ewington	New Zealand	DQ	-	-	-
-	56	Alex Mapelli-Mozzi	Great Britain	DQ	-	-	-
-	61	Chen Yun-ming	Republic of China	DQ	-	-	-
-	62	Gorban Ali Kalhor	Iran	DQ	-	-	-
-	64	Chia Kuo-liang	Republic of China	DQ	-	-	-
