= Alpine skiing at the 1972 Winter Olympics – Men's slalom =

Men's slalom at the XI Olympic Winter Games
- Alpine skiing
- Venue: Teine; Sapporo, Japan
- Date: February 12–13, 1972
- Competitors: 58 from 25 nations
- Winning time: 1:49.27

Medalists
1st place, gold medalist(s)		Francisco Fernández Ochoa	Spain
2nd place, silver medalist(s)		Gustavo Thoeni	Italy
3rd place, bronze medalist(s)		Rolando Thoeni	Italy

Men's Slalom
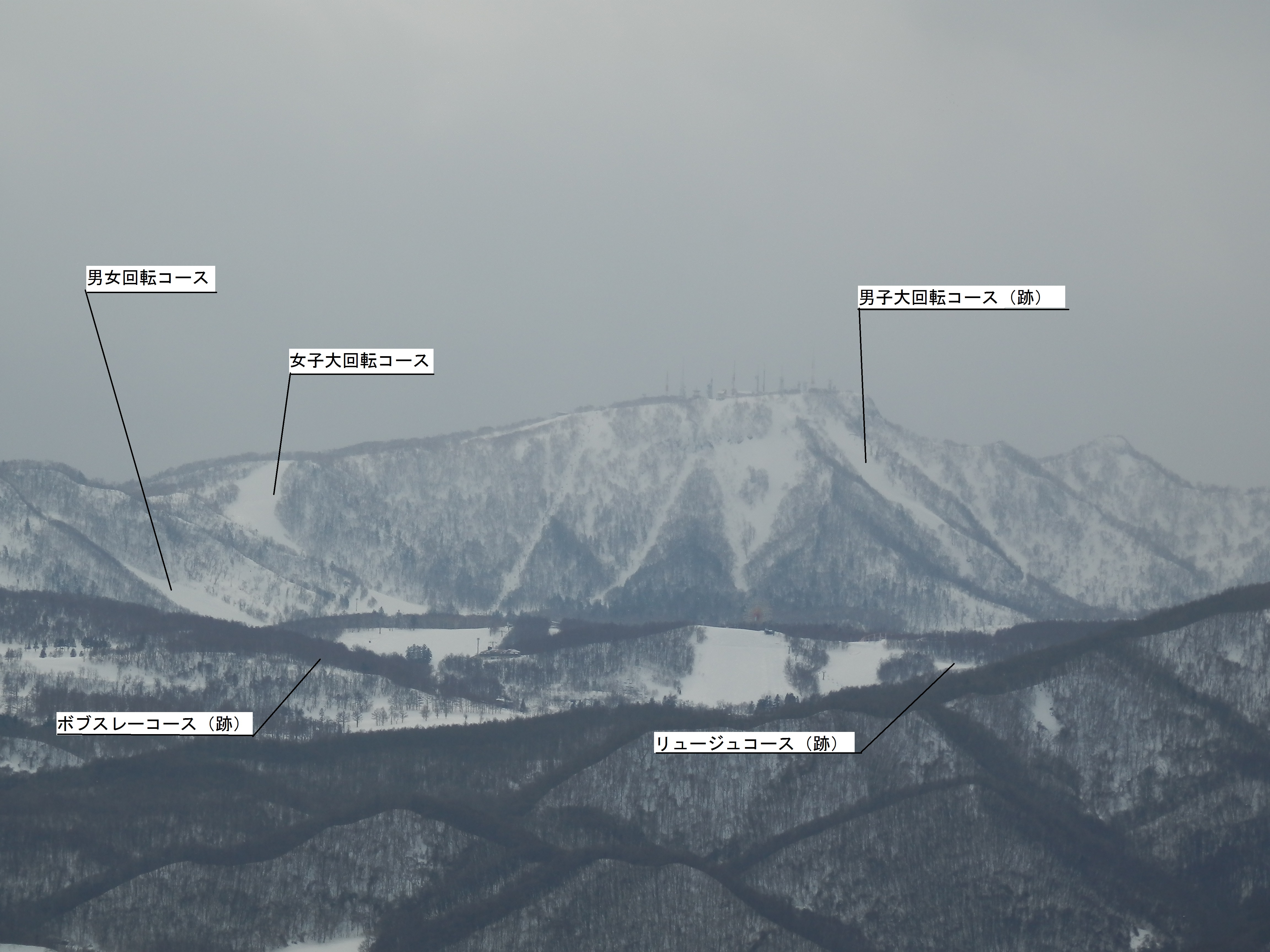
- Location: Teine
- Vertical: 228 m (748 ft)
- Top elevation: 795 m (2,608 ft)
- Base elevation: 567 m (1,860 ft)

Locations on Hokkaido

The Men's slalom competition of the Sapporo 1972 Olympics was held at Teine.

The defending world champion was Jean-Noel Augert of France, who was also the defending World Cup slalom champion and the leader of the 1972 World Cup.

== Results ==
=== Final ===
Sunday, February 13, 1972

Rank	Name	Country	Run 1	Run 2	Total	Difference
1st place, gold medalist(s)	Francisco Fernández Ochoa	Spain	0:55.36	0:53.91	1:49.27	—
2nd place, silver medalist(s)	Gustavo Thoeni	Italy	0:56.69	0:53.59	1:50.28	+1.01
3rd place, bronze medalist(s)	Rolando Thoeni	Italy	0:56.14	0:54.16	1:50.30	+1.03
4	Henri Duvillard	France	0:55.92	0:54.53	1:50.45	+1.18
5	Jean-Noël Augert	France	0:55.77	0:54.74	1:50.51	+1.24
6	Eberardo Schmalzl	Italy	0:56.11	0:54.72	1:50.83	+1.56
7	David Zwilling	Austria	0:57.30	0:54.67	1:51.97	+2.70
8	Edy Bruggmann	Switzerland	0:57.49	0:54.54	1:52.03	+2.76
9	Tyler Palmer	United States	0:57.68	0:54.37	1:52.05	+2.78
10	Andrzej Bachleda-Curuś	Poland	0:57.04	0:55.22	1:52.26	+2.99
11	Christian Neureuther	West Germany	0:58.42	0:54.48	1:52.90	+3.63
12	Aurelio García	Spain	0:57.61	0:55.51	1:53.12	+3.85
13	Walter Tresch	Switzerland	0:57.90	0:55.61	1:53.51	+4.24
14	Alfred Matt	Austria	0:58.44	0:55.24	1:53.68	+4.41
15	Adolf Rösti	Switzerland	0:58.08	0:56.08	1:54.16	+4.89
16	Terry Palmer	United States	0:58.78	0:55.50	1:54.28	+5.01
17	Masami Ichimura	Japan	0:57.58	0:57.25	1:54.83	+5.56
18	Masayoshi Kashiwagi	Japan	1:00.19	0:56.42	1:56.61	+7.34
19	Jim Hunter	Canada	1:02.02	0:59.50	2:01.52	+12.25
20	Virgil Brenci	Romania	1:01.56	1:00.02	2:01.58	+12.31
21	Sven Mikaelsson	Sweden	1:01.00	1:00.72	2:01.72	+12.45
22	Sergey Grishchenko	Soviet Union	1:02.97	0:59.70	2:02.67	+13.40
23	Reto Barrington	Canada	1:04.02	0:59.23	2:03.25	+13.98
24	Malcolm Milne	Australia	1:03.73	1:01.99	2:05.72	+16.45
25	Robert Blanchaer	Belgium	1:05.78	1:01.58	2:07.36	+18.09
26	Royston Varley	Great Britain	1:06.31	1:01.54	2:07.85	+18.58
27	Ivan Penev	Bulgaria	1:06.84	1:02.84	2:09.68	+20.41
28	Iain Finlayson	Great Britain	1:06.86	1:03.69	2:10.55	+21.28
29	Resmi Resmiev	Bulgaria	1:05.82	1:05.28	2:11.10	+21.83
30	Carlos Perner	Argentina	1:08.72	1:07.80	2:16.52	+27.25
31	Jorge-Emilio Lazzarini	Argentina	1:10.45	1:08.49	2:18.94	+29.67
32	Fayzollah Band Ali	Iran	1:18.14	1:14.61	2:32.75	+43.48
33	Gorban Ali Kalhor	Iran	1:18.34	1:19.19	2:37.53	+48.26
34	Chen Yun-Ming	Republic of China	1:27.98	1:25.49	2:53.47	+64.20
-	Hans-Jörg Schlager	West Germany	0:56.56	DNF	-	-
-	Alfred Hagn	West Germany	0:56.64	DNF	-	-
-	Alain Penz	France	0:56.72	DQ	-	-
-	Josef Loidl	Austria	0:58.60	DNF	-	-
-	Reinhard Tritscher	Austria	0:59.43	DQ	-	-
-	Manni Thofte	Sweden	1:01.14	DNF	-	-
-	Olle Rolén	Sweden	1:01.19	DNF	-	-
-	Haruhisa Chiba	Japan	1:01.25	DNF	-	-
-	Dan Cristea	Romania	?	DNF	-	-
-	Toshimasa Furukawa	Japan	?	DQ	-	-
-	Chris Womersley	New Zealand	?	DNF	-	-
-	Ben Nanasca	Philippines	?	DNF	-	-
-	Lotfollah Kia Shemshaki	Iran	?	DNF	-	-
-	Ali Saveh	Iran	?	DQ	-	-
-	Max Rieger	West Germany	DNF	-	-	-
-	Andreas Sprecher	Switzerland	DNF	-	-	-
-	Erik Håker	Norway	DNF	-	-	-
-	Rick Chaffee	United States	DNF	-	-	-
-	Steven Clifford	Australia	DNF	-	-	-
-	Herbert Marxer	Liechtenstein	DNF	-	-	-
-	Derek Robbins	Canada	DNF	-	-	-
-	Alex Mapelli-Mozzi	Great Britain	DNF	-	-	-
-	Ross Ewington	New Zealand	DNF	-	-	-
-	Ghassan Keyrouz	Lebanon	DNF	-	-	-
-	Georgios Tambouris	Greece	DNF	-	-	-
-	Panagiotis Alexandris	Greece	DNF	-	-	-
-	Spyros Theodorou	Greece	DNF	-	-	-
-	Juan Cipriano	Philippines	DNF	-	-	-
-	Konrad Bartelski	Great Britain	DNF	-	-	-
-	Willi Frommelt	Liechtenstein	DQ	-	-	-
-	Bob Cochran	United States	DQ	-	-	-
-	Otto Tschudi	Norway	DQ	-	-	-
-	Erwin Stricker	Italy	DQ	-	-	-
-	Marko Kavčič	Yugoslavia	DQ	-	-	-
-	Peik Christensen	Norway	DQ	-	-	-

=== Classification ===
Saturday, February 12, 1972
The classification round determined the starting order in the final.

==== Group 1 ====
Rank	Name	Country	Time	Difference
1	Haruhisa Chiba	Japan	1:43.17	-
2	Peik Christensen	Norway	1:45.36	+2.19
3	Olle Rolén	Sweden	1:47.88	+4.71
4	Chris Womersley	New Zealand	1:48.49	+5.32
5	Ivan Penev	Bulgaria	1:53.24	+10.07
6	Chen Yun-Ming	Republic of China	2:19.65	+36.48
-	Spyros Theodorou	Greece	DNF	-
-	Steven Clifford	Australia	DQ	-
-	Erwin Stricker	Italy	DQ	-
-	Alfred Matt	Austria	DQ	-
-	Iain Finlayson	Great Britain	DQ	-

==== Group 2 ====
Rank	Name	Country	Time	Difference
1	Adolf Rösti	Switzerland	1:44.20	-
2	Josef Loidl	Austria	1:44.27	+0.07
3	Toshimasa Furukawa	Japan	1:46.33	+2.13
4	Jim Hunter	Canada	1:47.16	+2.96
5	Sven Mikaelsson	Sweden	1:48.03	+3.83
6	Fayzollah Band Ali	Iran	2:16.03	+31.83
-	Malcolm Milne	Australia	DQ	-
-	Resmi Resmiev	Bulgaria	DQ	-
-	Chia Kuo-Liang	Republic of China	DQ	-
-	Carlos Perner	Argentina	DQ	-
-	Konrad Bartelski	Great Britain	DQ	-

==== Group 3 ====
Rank	Name	Country	Time	Difference
1	Hans-Jörg Schlager	West Germany	1:43.30	-
2	Andreas Sprecher	Switzerland	1:44.60	+1.30
3	Rick Chaffee	United States	1:47.81	+4.51
4	Gorban Ali Kalhor	Iran	2:18.86	+35.56
5	Georgios Tambouris	Greece	2:25.59	+42.29
-	Juan Cipriano	Philippines	DNF	-
-	Robert Blanchaer	Belgium	DQ	-
-	Alex Mapelli-Mozzi	Great Britain	DQ	-
-	Erik Håker	Norway	DQ	-
-	Herbert Marxer	Liechtenstein	DQ	-
-	Hwang Wei-Chung	Republic of China	DQ	-
-	Reto Barrington	Canada	DQ	-

==== Group 4 ====
Rank	Name	Country	Time	Difference
1	Aurelio García	Spain	1:43.39	-
2	Willi Frommelt	Liechtenstein	1:43.39	+0.00
3	Marko Kavčič	Yugoslavia	1:44.53	+1.14
4	Virgil Brenci	Romania	1:46.46	+3.07
5	Sergey Grishchenko	Soviet Union	1:49.64	+6.25
6	Panagiotis Alexandris	Greece	1:59.79	+16.40
7	Ben Nanasca	Philippines	2:07.69	+24.30
-	Derek Robbins	Canada	DNF	-
-	Masayoshi Kashiwagi	Japan	DNF	-
-	Bob Cochran	United States	DQ	-
-	Otto Tschudi	Norway	DQ	-
-	Lotfollah Kia Shemshaki	Iran	DQ	-

==== Group 5 ====
Rank	Name	Country	Time	Difference
1	Masami Ichimura	Japan	1:42.90	-
2	Walter Tresch	Switzerland	1:43.91	+1.01
3	Reinhard Tritscher	Austria	1:44.06	+1.16
4	Terry Palmer	United States	1:45.82	+2.92
5	Ross Ewington	New Zealand	1:54.16	+11.26
6	Ghassan Keyrouz	Lebanon	2:10.04	+27.14
7	Wang Cheng-Che	Republic of China	2:28.89	+45.99
8	Jorge-Emilio Lazzarini	Argentina	2:33.86	+50.96
-	Ali Saveh	Iran	DNF	-
-	Manni Thofte	Sweden	DNF	-
-	Royston Varley	Great Britain	DNF	-
-	Dan Cristea	Romania	DQ	-
