= Alpine skiing at the 1972 Winter Olympics – Men's downhill =

Men's downhill at the XI Olympic Winter Games
- Alpine skiing
- Venue: Mount Eniwa; Hokkaido, Japan
- Date: February 7, 1972
- Competitors: 55 from 20 nations
- Winning time: 1:51.43

Medalists
1st place, gold medalist(s)		Bernhard Russi	Switzerland
2nd place, silver medalist(s)		Roland Collombin	Switzerland
3rd place, bronze medalist(s)		Heinrich Messner	Austria

Men's Downhill
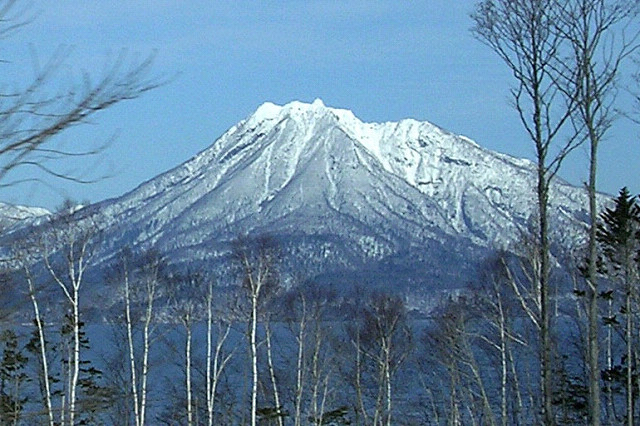
- Location: Mount Eniwa
- Vertical: 772 m (2,533 ft)
- Top elevation: 1,126 m (3,694 ft)
- Base elevation: 354 m (1,161 ft)
- Longest run: 2.640 km (1.64 mi)

Locations on Hokkaido

The Men's Downhill competition of the Sapporo 1972 Olympics was held at Mount Eniwa on Monday, February 7.

The defending world champion was Bernhard Russi of Switzerland, who was also the defending World Cup downhill champion, and Austria's Karl Schranz led the current season. Schranz was classified as a professional and banned from the Olympics. The defending Olympic champion, Jean Claude Killy of France, had retired from World Cup and international competition in the spring of 1968.

Russi won the gold medal, teammate Roland Collombin took the silver, and Heini Messner of Austria won the bronze.

The starting gate was at an elevation of 1,126 m (3,694 ft) above sea level, with a vertical drop of 772 m (2,533 ft). The course length was 2.640 km (1.64 mi) and Russi's winning run of 111.43 seconds resulted in an average speed of 85.291 km/h (53.0 mph), with an average vertical descent rate of 6.928 m/s (22.7 ft/s).

== Results ==
The race started at 13:30 JST (UTC+9) under clear skies, with an air temperature of −7 °C (19 °F).

Rank	Bib	Name	Country	Time	Difference
1st place, gold medalist(s)	4	Bernhard Russi	Switzerland	1:51.43	—
2nd place, silver medalist(s)	11	Roland Collombin	Switzerland	1:52.07	+0.64
3rd place, bronze medalist(s)	5	Heinrich Messner	Austria	1:52.40	+0.97
4	1	Andreas Sprecher	Switzerland	1:53.11	+1.68
5	26	Erik Håker	Norway	1:53.16	+1.73
6	13	Walter Tresch	Switzerland	1:53.19	+1.76
7	8	Karl Cordin	Austria	1:53.32	+1.89
8	18	Bob Cochran	United States	1:53.39	+1.96
9	22	Josef Loidl	Austria	1:53.71	+2.28
10	7	Marcello Varallo	Italy	1:53.85	+2.42
11	17	Giuliano Besson	Italy	1:54.15	+2.72
11	10	Stefano Anzi	Italy	1:54.15	+2.72
13	2	Gustav Thöni	Italy	1:54.37	+2.94
14	15	Mike Lafferty	United States	1:54.38	+2.95
15	20	Roger Rossat-Mignod	France	1:54.72	+3.29
16	3	Bernard Orcel	France	1:54.81	+3.38
17	14	David Currier	United States	1:54.96	+3.53
18	25	Hans-Jörg Schlager	West Germany	1:55.05	+3.62
19	27	Henri Duvillard	France	1:55.13	+3.70
20	30	Jim Hunter	Canada	1:55.16	+3.73
21	9	Bernard Charvin	France	1:55.33	+3.90
22	24	Sumihiro Tomii	Japan	1:55.34	+3.91
23	6	Malcolm Milne	Australia	1:55.48	+4.05
24	12	Franz Vogler	West Germany	1:55.50	+4.07
25	19	Hank Kashiwa	United States	1:55.60	+4.17
26	23	Herbert Marxer	Liechtenstein	1:55.90	+4.47
27	29	Alfred Hagn	West Germany	1:56.04	+4.61
28	42	Manni Thofte	Sweden	1:56.66	+5.23
29	21	Willi Lesch	West Germany	1:56.67	+5.24
30	44	Willi Frommelt	Liechtenstein	1:57.58	+6.15
31	31	Reinhard Tritscher	Austria	1:58.05	+6.62
32	28	Reto Barrington	Canada	1:58.29	+6.86
33	48	Royston Varley	Great Britain	1:58.53	+7.10
34	45	Olle Rolén	Sweden	1:59.28	+7.85
35	43	Masahiko Otsue	Japan	1:59.55	+8.12
36	47	Peik Christensen	Norway	1:59.71	+8.28
37	37	Alex Mapelli-Mozzi	Great Britain	2:00.28	+8.85
38	49	Derek Robbins	Canada	2:00.38	+8.95
39	53	Dan Cristea	Romania	2:01.26	+9.83
40	36	Ivan Penev	Bulgaria	2:02.16	+10.73
41	40	Chris Womersley	New Zealand	2:02.24	+10.81
42	50	Robert Blanchaer	Belgium	2:02.45	+11.02
43	39	Konrad Bartelski	Great Britain	2:02.71	+11.28
44	46	Steven Clifford	Australia	2:02.90	+11.47
45	41	Resmi Resmiev	Bulgaria	2:03.01	+11.58
46	62	Sergey Grishchenko	Soviet Union	2:03.19	+11.76
47	54	Carlos Perner	Argentina	2:03.69	+12.26
48	55	Virgil Brenci	Romania	2:04.33	+12.90
49	38	Ross Ewington	New Zealand	2:04.75	+13.32
50	56	Iain Finlayson	Great Britain	2:06.50	+15.07
51	58	Jorge-Emilio Lazzarini	Argentina	2:08.29	+16.86
52	60	Ali Saveh	Iran	2:11.29	+19.86
53	61	Lotfollah Kia Shemshaki	Iran	2:16.14	+24.71
54	57	Fayzollah Band Ali	Iran	2:18.19	+26.76
55	59	Gorban Ali Kalhor	Iran	2:20.98	+29.55
