= FIS Alpine World Ski Championships 1972 – Men's alpine combined =

Men's alpine combined at the FIS Alpine World Ski Championships 1972
- Location: Sapporo, Japan
- Dates: 13 February
- Competitors: 27 from 18 nations
- Winning time: 21.12 pts

Medalists
gold medal	Gustav Thöni	Italy
silver medal	Walter Tresch	Switzerland
bronze medal	Jim Hunter	Canada

The Men's alpine combined competition at the 1972 World Championships was held on 13 February 1972, but it was a paper race.

Alpine Combined event was valid for the World Championships only. No Olympic medals were awarded for this event. Results from all three events of the 1972 Winter Olympics (downhill, slalom, and giant slalom) were translated into FIS points, and then added together to decide the outcome.

== Results ==
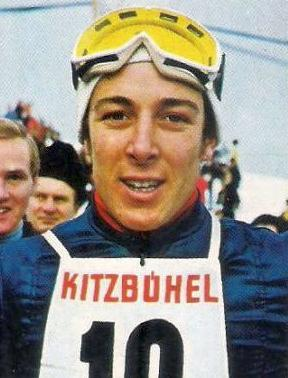
Gustav Thöni three medals won (two gold) at this edition of the World Championships.

#	Skier	Country	DH	GS	SL	AC
1st place, gold medalist(s)	Gustav Thöni	Italy	16.27	0.00	4.84	21.12
2nd place, silver medalist(s)	Walter Tresch	Switzerland	9.88	17.62	19.48	46.98
3rd place, bronze medalist(s)	Jim Hunter	Canada	20.54	11.72	54.15	86.41
4	Reto Barrington	Canada	36.87	25.68	61.31	122.66
5	Malcolm Milne	Australia	22.26	41.04	71.40	134.70
6	Virgil Brenci	Romania	66.72	56.46	54.40	177.58
7	Robert Blanchaer	Belgium	57.69	62.20	77.94	197.83
8	Ivan Penev	Bulgaria	56.25	56.25	86.67	199.17
9	Resmi Resmiev	Bulgaria	60.38	90.92	91.78	243.08
10	Jorge-Emilio Lazzarini	Argentina	85.35	100.95	118.51	304.81
11	Feizollah Bandali	Iran	128.59	149.49	161.94	439.82
-	David Zwilling	Austria	DNS			-
-	Andrzej Bachleda-Curus	Poland	DNS			-
-	Edmund Bruggmann	Switzerland	DNS			-
-	Aurelio Garcia	Spain	DNS			-
-	Hank Kashiwa	United States		DNS		-
-	Sep Loidl	Austria		DNF		-
-	Bob Cochran	United States		DNF		-
-	Hans-Joerg Schlager	Germany		DNF		-
-	Willi Frommelt	Liechtenstein		DNF		-
-	Herbert Marxer	Liechtenstein		DNF		-
-	Peik Christensen	Norway		DNF		-
-	Dan Cristea	Romania		DNF		-
-	Henry Duvillard	France			DNF	-
-	Carlos Perner	Argentina			DNF	-
-	Sven Mikaelsson	Sweden	DNF			-
-	Reinhardt Tritscher	Austria	DSQ			-

== See also ==
- Alpine skiing at the 1972 Winter Olympics
