= FIS Alpine World Ski Championships 1976 – Men's alpine combined =

Men's alpine combined at the FIS Alpine World Ski Championships 1976
- Location: Innsbruck, Austria
- Dates: 14 February
- Competitors: 26 from 19 nations
- Winning time: 24.62 pts

Medalists
gold medal	Gustav Thöni	Italy
silver medal	Willi Frommelt	Liechtenstein
bronze medal	Greg Jones	United States

The Men's alpine combined competition at the 1976 World Championships was held on 14 February 1976, but it was a paper race.

== Results ==
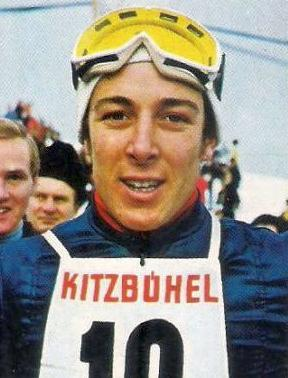
Gustav Thöni two medals won (one gold) at this edition of the World Championships.

Alpine Combined event was valid for the World Championships only. No Olympic medals were awarded for this event. Results from all three events of the 1976 Winter Olympics (downhill, slalom, and giant slalom) were translated into FIS points, and then added together to decide the outcome.

#	Skier	Country	Points	Downhill		Giant slalom		Slalom	
#	Skier	Country	Points	FIS pts.	Time	FIS pts.	Time	FIS pts.	Time
1	Gustavo Thoni	Italy	24.62	20.61*	1:49.25	2.12	3:27.67	1.89	2:03.73
2	Willy Frommelt	Liechtenstein	48.97	18.71*	1:48.92	26.03	3:35.71	4.23	2:04.28
3	Greg Jones	United States	65.84	12.43	1:47.84	14.43	3:31.77	38.98	2:12.71
4	Wolfgang Junginger	West Germany	70.63	27.66*	1:50.48	26.94	3:36.02	16.03	2:07.08
5	Andreas Wenzel	Liechtenstein	75.85	25.38*	1:50.08	27.61	3:36.25	22.86	2:08.73
6	Francisco Fernadez-Ochoa	Spain	90.09	35.76*	1:51.91	33.03	3:38.12	21.30	2:08.35
7	Miloslav Sochor	Czechoslovakia	86.61	40.5-	1:53.48	19.64	3:33.53	26.47	2:09.61
8	Jim Hunter	Canada	97.44	10.56	1:47.52	30.83	3:37.36	56.05	2:17.06
9	Josef Ferstl	West Germany	112.96	15.75	1:48.41	42.77	3:41.52	54.44	2:14.34
10	Sumihiro Tomii	Japan	144.56	18.48	1:48.88	65.68	3:49.73	60.40	2:18.67
11	Ivan Penev	Bulgaria	166.42	55.96	1:55.56	50.06	3:44.10	60.40	2:18.19
12	Roman Derezinski	Poland	183.61	60.14	1:56.33	76.49	3:53.71	46.98	2:14.73
13	Jose Luis Koifman	Chile	246.12	59.98	1:56.30	96.74	4:01.35	89.40	2:25.97
14	Dan Cristea	Romania	258.44	56.34	1:55.63	106.93	4:05.29	95.17	2:27.57
15	Brett Kendall	New Zealand	319.02	82.68	2:00.57	103.74	4:04.05	132.60	2:38.38
16	Carlos Font Puig	Andorra	435.95	88.81	2:01.75	157.13	4:25.65	190.01	2:56.52
-	Juan Manuel Fernández Ochoa	Spain	51.79?	28.5-	1:52.40	23.29	3:34.77	DNF R1	
-	Bohumir Zeman	Czechoslovakia	63.56	32.15	1:51.27	31.41	3:37.56	DNF R1	
-	Alan Stewart	United Kingdom	93.55	28.12	1:50.56	65.43	3:49.64	DSQ R1	
-	Mikio Katagiri	Japan	98.93	25.09	1:50.03	73.84	3:52.73	DNF R1	
-	Jaime Ros	Spain	115.90?	44.6-	1:53.50	71.30	3:51.79	DNF R1	
-	Robert Blanchaer	Belgium	136.73	49.06	1:54.30	87.67	3:57.90	DNF R1	
-	Luis Rosenkjer	Argentina	160.29?	29.8-	1:50.87	61.36	3:48.16	DNF R1	
-	Kalhor Ghorban Ali	Iran	191.48	75.22	1:59.15	116.26	4:08.95	DNF R1	
-	Spiros Theodorou	Greece	328.68	163.47	2:17.08	165.21	4:29.08	DNF R1	
-	Thomas Karadimos	Greece	372.56	152.39	2:14.69	220.17	4:53.63	DNF R1	

== See also ==
- Alpine skiing at the 1976 Winter Olympics
