= Austria at the 1972 Winter Olympics =

- IOC code: AUT
- NOC: Austrian Olympic Committee
- Website: www.olympia.at (in German)

in Sapporo
- Competitors: 40 (29 men, 11 women) in 8 sports
- Flag bearer: Manfred Schmid (luge)
- Medals Ranked 9th: Gold 1 Silver 2 Bronze 2 Total 5

Winter Olympics appearances (overview)
- 1924; 1928; 1932; 1936; 1948; 1952; 1956; 1960; 1964; 1968; 1972; 1976; 1980; 1984; 1988; 1992; 1994; 1998; 2002; 2006; 2010; 2014; 2018; 2022; 2026

Austria competed at the 1972 Winter Olympics in Sapporo, Japan.

== Medalists ==
Medal	Name	Sport	Event
Gold	Beatrix Schuba	Figure skating	Ladies singles
Silver	Annemarie Moser-Proll	Alpine skiing	Women's downhill
Silver	Annemarie Moser-Proll	Alpine skiing	Women's giant slalom
Bronze	Wiltrud Drexel	Alpine skiing	Women's giant slalom
Bronze	Heinrich Messner	Alpine skiing	Men's downhill

== Alpine skiing ==
Men

Athlete	Event	Race 1		Race 2		Total	
Athlete	Event	Time	Rank	Time	Rank	Time	Rank
Reinhard Tritscher	Downhill					1:58.05	31
Josef Loidl	Downhill					1:53.71	9
Karl Cordin	Downhill					1:53.32	7
Heini Meßner	Downhill					1:52.40	3rd place, bronze medalist(s)
Josef Loidl	Giant slalom	1:36.26	25	1:38.39	7	3:14.65	12
Werner Bleiner	Giant slalom	1:34.18	15	1:41.78	22	3:15.96	18
Reinhard Tritscher	Giant slalom	1:32.51	5	1:39.88	14	3:12.39	8
David Zwilling	Giant slalom	1:32.34	4	1:39.98	15	3:12.32	7

Men's slalom

Athlete	Classification		Final					
Athlete	Time	Rank	Time 1	Rank	Time 2	Rank	Total	Rank
Alfred Matt	DSQ	–	58.44	19	55.24	12	1:53.68	14
Josef Loidl	1:44.27	2	58.60	20	DNF	–	DNF	–
Reinhard Tritscher	1:44.06	3	59.43	22	DSQ	–	DSQ	–
David Zwilling	bye		57.30	11	54.67	8	1:51.97	7

Women

Athlete	Event	Race 1		Race 2		Total	
Athlete	Event	Time	Rank	Time	Rank	Time	Rank
Monika Kaserer	Downhill					1:42.59	30
Brigitte Totschnig	Downhill					1:40.73	15
Bernadette Rauter	Downhill					1:39.84	9
Annemarie Moser-Pröll	Downhill					1:37.00	2nd place, silver medalist(s)
Gertrud Gabl	Giant slalom					DNF	–
Monika Kaserer	Giant slalom					1:33.42	13
Wiltrud Drexel	Giant slalom					1:32.35	3rd place, bronze medalist(s)
Annemarie Moser-Pröll	Giant slalom					1:30.75	2nd place, silver medalist(s)
Wiltrud Drexel	Slalom	DNF	–	–	–	DNF	–
Gertrud Gabl	Slalom	47.80	11	DNF	–	DNF	–
Monika Kaserer	Slalom	47.59	9	46.77	5	1:34.36	7
Annemarie Moser-Pröll	Slalom	47.20	6	46.83	6	1:34.03	5

== Bobsleigh ==
Sled	Athletes	Event	Run 1		Run 2		Run 3		Run 4		Total	
Sled	Athletes	Event	Time	Rank	Time	Rank	Time	Rank	Time	Rank	Time	Rank
AUT-1	Herbert Gruber; Josef Oberhauser	Two-man	1:16.48	6	1:16.34	5	1:14.44	9	1:14.34	6	5:01.60	8
AUT-2	Werner Delle Karth; Fritz Sperling	Two-man	1:16.99	10	1:17.91	18	1:15.84	20	1:14.61	8	5:05.35	13

Sled	Athletes	Event	Run 1		Run 2		Run 3		Run 4		Total	
Sled	Athletes	Event	Time	Rank	Time	Rank	Time	Rank	Time	Rank	Time	Rank
AUT-1	Herbert Gruber; Utz Chwalla; Josef Eder; Josef Oberhauser	Four-man	1:11.20	4	1:12.46	10	1:11.11	8	1:11.00	5	4:45.77	6
AUT-2	Werner Delle Karth; Werner Moser; Walter Delle Karth; Fritz Sperling	Four-man	1:11.58	8	1:12.46	10	1:11.16	10	1:11.46	10	4:46.66	7

== Cross-country skiing ==
Men

Event	Athlete	Race	
Event	Athlete	Time	Rank
15 km	Herbert Wachter	49:44.13	42
15 km	Heinrich Wallner	49:17.97	38
30 km	Josef Hauser	DNF	–
30 km	Heinrich Wallner	1'48:05.42	48
30 km	Herbert Wachter	1'44:45.67	33

Men's 4 × 10 km relay

Athletes	Race	
Athletes	Time	Rank
Herbert Wachter; Josef Hauser; Ulli Öhlböck; Heinrich Wallner	DNF	–

== Figure skating ==
Men

Athlete	CF	FS	Points	Places	Rank
Günter Anderl	14	16	2313.6	138	15

Women

Athlete	CF	FS	Points	Places	Rank
Sonja Balun	17	17	2260.6	148	17
Beatrix Schuba	1	7	2751.5	9	1st place, gold medalist(s)

== Luge ==
Men

Athlete	Run 1		Run 2		Run 3		Run 4		Total	
Athlete	Time	Rank	Time	Rank	Time	Rank	Time	Rank	Time	Rank
Franz Schachner	54.67	23	54.38	24	53.40	24	53.17	18	3:35.62	23
Rudolf Schmid	54.33	20	53.93	18	52.74	17	52.76	14	3:33.76	16
Josef Feistmantl	53.18	10	53.11	9	52.52	13	52.51	11	3:31.32	10
Manfred Schmid	53.06	7	52.80	8	52.19	7	52.00	6	3:30.05	7

(Men's) Doubles

Athletes	Run 1		Run 2		Total	
Athletes	Time	Rank	Time	Rank	Time	Rank
Manfred Schmid; Ewald Walch	44.92	7	44.83	6	1:29.75	7
Rudolf Schmid; Franz Schachner	45.37	10	45.31	9	1:30.68	9

Women

Athlete	Run 1		Run 2		Run 3		Run 4		Total	
Athlete	Time	Rank	Time	Rank	Time	Rank	Time	Rank	Time	Rank
Margit Graf	46.89	16	46.92	18	46.25	15	46.23	19	3:06.29	16
Antonia Mayr	46.15	12	46.36	11	45.97	11	46.12	17	3:04.60	14
Angelika Schafferer	46.00	11	46.41	13	45.94	10	45.71	14	3:04.06	11

== Nordic combined ==
Events:

- normal hill ski jumping (Three jumps, best two counted and shown here.)
- 15 km cross-country skiing

Athlete	Event	Ski Jumping				Cross-country			Total	
Athlete	Event	Distance 1	Distance 2	Points	Rank	Time	Points	Rank	Points	Rank
Ulli Öhlböck	Individual	63.0	67.5	150.9	33	53:59.5	169.810	35	320.710	37

== Ski jumping ==
Athlete	Event	Jump 1		Jump 2		Total	
Athlete	Event	Distance	Points	Distance	Points	Points	Rank
Max Golser	Normal hill	73.0	95.5	73.5	100.3	195.8	36
Reinhold Bachler	Normal hill	73.5	100.3	73.5	101.3	201.6	29
Rudi Wanner	Normal hill	77.0	104.4	74.0	100.6	205.0	26
Rudi Wanner	Large hill	79.0	69.6	83.0	82.7	152.3	46
Max Golser	Large hill	86.0	84.9	78.0	68.7	153.6	43
Reinhold Bachler	Large hill	88.5	88.9	89.5	90.3	179.2	24

== Speed skating ==
Men

Event	Athlete	Race	
Event	Athlete	Time	Rank
500 m	Otmar Braunecker	42.14	23
1500 m	Otmar Braunecker	2:14.88	31
