= List of flag bearers for Spain at the Olympics =

Spain at the Olympics
- IOC code: ESP
- NOC: Spanish Olympic Committee
- Website: www.coe.es (in Spanish)
- Medals: Gold 54 Silver 77 Bronze 61 Total 192

Summer appearances
- 1900; 1904–1912; 1920; 1924; 1928; 1932; 1936; 1948; 1952; 1956; 1960; 1964; 1968; 1972; 1976; 1980; 1984; 1988; 1992; 1996; 2000; 2004; 2008; 2012; 2016; 2020; 2024

Winter appearances
- 1936; 1948; 1952; 1956; 1960; 1964; 1968; 1972; 1976; 1980; 1984; 1988; 1992; 1994; 1998; 2002; 2006; 2010; 2014; 2018; 2022; 2026

This is a list of flag bearers who have represented Spain at the Olympics.

Flag bearers (Spanish: abanderados) carry the national flag of their country at the opening ceremony of the Olympic Games.

#	Event year	Season	Flag bearer	Sport
1	1920	Summer	José García Lorenzana	Athletics
2	1924	Summer	Félix Mendizábal	Athletics
3	1928	Summer	Diego Ordóñez	Athletics
4	1932	Summer	Julio Castro	Shooting
5	1936	Winter	Jesús Suárez-Valgrande	Alpine skiing
6	1948	Winter	José Arias	Alpine skiing
7	1948	Summer	Fabián Vicente	Boxing (referee)
8	1952	Winter	José Picurio	Official
9	1952	Summer	Luis Omedes	Rowing
10	1956	Winter	Luis Arias	Alpine skiing
11	1960	Winter	Luis Sánchez	Alpine skiing
12	1960	Summer	Jaime Belenguer	Gymnastics
13	1964	Winter	Jorge Rodríguez	Alpine skiing
14	1964	Summer	Eduardo Dualde	Field hockey
15	1968	Winter	Aurelio García	Alpine skiing
16	1968	Summer	Gonzalo Fernández de Córdoba	Sailing
17	1972	Winter	Francisco Fernández Ochoa	Alpine skiing
18	1972	Summer	Francisco Fernández Ochoa	Alpine skiing
19	1976	Winter	Francisco Fernández Ochoa	Alpine skiing
20	1976	Summer	Enrique Rodríguez	Boxing
21	1980	Winter	Francisco Fernández Ochoa	Alpine skiing
22	1980	Summer	Herminio Menéndez	Canoeing
23	1984	Winter	Blanca Fernández Ochoa	Alpine skiing
24	1984	Summer	Alejandro Abascal	Sailing
25	1988	Winter	Ainhoa Ibarra	Alpine skiing
26	1988	Summer	Infanta Cristina of Spain	Sailing
27	1992	Winter	Blanca Fernández Ochoa	Alpine skiing
28	1992	Summer	Felipe, Prince of Asturias	Sailing
29	1994	Winter	Ainhoa Ibarra	Alpine skiing
30	1996	Summer	Luis Doreste	Sailing
31	1998	Winter	Juan Jesús Gutiérrez	Cross-country skiing
32	2000	Summer	Manuel Estiarte	Water polo
33	2002	Winter	Iker Fernández	Snowboarding
34	2004	Summer	Isabel Fernández	Judo
35	2006	Winter	María José Rienda	Alpine skiing
36	2008	Summer	David Cal	Canoeing
37	2010	Winter	Queralt Castellet	Snowboarding
38	2012	Summer	Pau Gasol	Basketball
39	2014	Winter	Javier Fernández	Figure skating
40	2016	Summer	Rafael Nadal	Tennis
41	2018	Winter	Lucas Eguibar	Snowboarding
42	2020	Summer	Mireia Belmonte	Swimming
42	2020	Summer	Saúl Craviotto	Canoeing
43	2022	Winter	Queralt Castellet	Snowboarding
43	2022	Winter	Ander Mirambell	Skeleton
44	2024	Summer	Támara Echegoyen	Sailing
44	2024	Summer	Marcus Walz	Canoeing
45	2026	Winter	Joaquim Salarich	Alpine skiing
45	2026	Winter	Olivia Smart	Figure skating

== See also ==
- Spain at the Olympics
