= Australia at the 1972 Winter Olympics =

- IOC code: AUS
- NOC: Australian Olympic Committee
- Website: www.olympics.com.au

in Sapporo
- Competitors: 4 in 2 sports
- Medals: Gold 0 Silver 0 Bronze 0 Total 0

Winter Olympics appearances (overview)
- 1936; 1948; 1952; 1956; 1960; 1964; 1968; 1972; 1976; 1980; 1984; 1988; 1992; 1994; 1998; 2002; 2006; 2010; 2014; 2018; 2022; 2026

Australia competed at the 1972 Winter Olympics in Sapporo, Japan.

Malcolm Milne, who won an international downhill race at Val d'Isère, France in 1970, almost fell during the downhill race, denying him a chance at an Olympic medal.

== Alpine skiing ==
Men

Athlete	Event	Classification		Final					
Athlete	Event	Time	Rank	Run 1	Rank	Run 2	Rank	Total	Rank
Steven Clifford	Downhill	—N/a						2:02.90	44
Steven Clifford	Giant slalom	—N/a		1:44.75	44	1:49.50	36	3:34.25	36
Steven Clifford	Slalom	Disqualified		Did not finish					
Malcolm Milne	Downhill	—N/a						1:55.48	23
Malcolm Milne	Giant slalom	—N/a		1:37.94	31	1:44.26	28	3:22.20	29
Malcolm Milne	Slalom	Disqualified		1:03.73	33	1:01.99	26	2:05.72	24

== Speed skating ==
Athlete	Event	Final	
Athlete	Event	Time	Rank
Colin Coates	500 m	44.74	36
Colin Coates	1500 m	2:12.14	24
Colin Coates	5000 m	8:09.35	23
Colin Coates	10000 m	16:29.94	18
Jim Lynch	500 m	43.51	35
Jim Lynch	1500 m	2:26.69	39

== See also ==
- Australia at the Winter Olympics
