= Juan Cipriano =

Filipino alpine skier (born 1952)

Personal information
- Born: May 18, 1952 (age 74) Philippines

Skiing career
- Sport: Alpine skiing ♂
- Disciplines: Slalom, giant slalom

Olympics
- Teams: 1 – (1972)

Juan Cipriano is a Filipino alpine skier who represented the Philippines at the 1972 Winter Olympics in Sapporo, Japan.

== Early life ==
Born on May 18, 1952 in the Philippines, Cipriano along with his cousin Ben Nanasca were adopted by New Zealanders and left the Philippines in 1968.

Cipriano, his cousin and their adopted family resided in Andorra where the cousins skied in the Pyrenees. They later resided in Spain, France and Switzerland.

== Career ==
Cipriano and Nanasca were scouted by the Swiss government and became part of an alpine skiing development group. The government sponsored their training. The two later qualified to compete at the 1972 Winter Olympics in Sapporo, Japan for the Philippines. They became the first Filipino Winter Olympians. Cipriano did not finish in the slalom and giant slalom events.
