= Ben Nanasca =

Filipino alpine skier (born 1954)

Personal information
- Born: December 29, 1954 (age 71) Philippines

Skiing career
- Sport: Alpine skiing ♂
- Disciplines: Slalom, giant slalom

Olympics
- Teams: 1 – (1972)

Ben Nanasca is a Filipino alpine skier who represented the Philippines at the 1972 Winter Olympics in Sapporo, Japan.

== Early life ==
Ben Nanasca was born on December 29, 1954 in the Philippines. He has six siblings. Nanasca along with his cousin Juan Cipriano were adopted by New Zealanders. His family had to put him for adoption due to hardships they experienced in the Philippines and left the country in 1968 after he and his cousin were adopted.

Nanasca, his cousin and their adopted family resided in Andorra where the cousins skied in the Pyrenees. They later resided in Spain, France and Switzerland.

== Career ==
Nanasca and Cipriano were scouted by the Swiss government and became part of an alpine skiing development group. The government sponsored their training. The two later qualified to compete at the 1972 Winter Olympics in Sapporo, Japan for the Philippines. They became the first Filipino Winter Olympians. Nanasca finished 42nd among 48 finishers in the giant slalom event with the time of 4:06.20. He did not finish in the slalom event.

== Post-Olympic ==
After the Olympics, Nanasca returned to the Philippines and shortly resided there before emigrating to New Zealand at age 18. He competed in local alpine skiing races there and was part of the New Zealand team. He also worked as a teacher for a year before starting to work with Youthtown in 1985 where he organizes outdoor camps.

== Personal life ==
Ben Nanasca is married to Florengel, a Filipino from Dumaguete, with whom he has two daughters; Karen and Alana. Both daughters are ballerinas. Karen is a member of the Melbourne-based Australian Ballet.
