= Terry Palmer (alpine skier) =

American alpine skier (born 1952)

Terry Palmer (born February 20, 1952, in Cambridge, Massachusetts) is an American former alpine skier who competed in the 1972 Winter Olympics, where he ranked 16th in the men's slalom. He has three children.
