= Republic of China at the 1972 Winter Olympics =

- Flag of the Republic of China
- IOC code: ROC
- NOC: Republic of China Olympic Committee (Note: See Chinese Taipei Olympic Committee#History.)

in Sapporo
- Competitors: 5 (men) in 2 sports
- Medals: Gold 0 Silver 0 Bronze 0 Total 0

Winter Olympics appearances (overview)
- 1972; 1976; 1980; 1984; 1988; 1992; 1994; 1998; 2002; 2006; 2010; 2014; 2018; 2022; 2026

The Republic of China (Taiwan) competed in the Winter Olympic Games for the first time at the 1972 Winter Olympics in Sapporo, Japan.

== Alpine skiing ==
Men

Athlete	Event	Race 1		Race 2		Total	
Athlete	Event	Time	Rank	Time	Rank	Time	Rank
Chia Kuo-liang	Giant Slalom	DSQ	–	–	–	DSQ	–
Chen Yun-ming	Giant Slalom	DSQ	–	–	–	DSQ	–
Wang Cheng-che	Giant Slalom	2:15.80	59	2:19.83	47	4:35.63	47
Hwang Wei-chung	Giant Slalom	2:11.29	58	2:29.58	48	4:40.87	48

Men's slalom

Athlete	Classification		Final					
Athlete	Time	Rank	Time 1	Rank	Time 2	Rank	Total	Rank
Chen Yun-ming	2:19.65	6	1:27.98	48	1:25.49	34	2:53.47	34
Chia Kuo-liang	DSQ	–	1:35.23	51	1:32.50	37	3:07.73	37
Hwang Wei-chung	DSQ	–	1:33.43	50	1:31.51	36	3:04.94	36
Wang Cheng-che	2:28.89	7	1:31.57	49	1:29.41	35	3:00.98	35

== Cross-country skiing ==
Men

Event	Athlete	Race	
Event	Athlete	Time	Rank
15 km	Liang Reng-guey	1'03:35.66	62
