= Greece at the 1972 Winter Olympics =

- IOC code: GRE
- NOC: Committee of the Olympic Games

in Sapporo Japan
- Competitors: 3 (men) in 1 sport
- Flag bearer: Panagiotis Alexandris
- Medals: Gold 0 Silver 0 Bronze 0 Total 0

Winter Olympics appearances (overview)
- 1936; 1948; 1952; 1956; 1960; 1964; 1968; 1972; 1976; 1980; 1984; 1988; 1992; 1994; 1998; 2002; 2006; 2010; 2014; 2018; 2022; 2026

Greece competed at the 1972 Winter Olympics in Sapporo, Japan.

== Alpine skiing ==
Men

Athlete	Event	Race 1		Race 2		Total	
Athlete	Event	Time	Rank	Time	Rank	Time	Rank
Georgios Tambouris	Giant Slalom	2:10.38	57	2:08.31	43	4:18.69	46
Panagiotis Alexandris	Giant Slalom	2:03.05	53	2:02.40	41	4:05.45	41
Spyros Theodorou	Giant Slalom	1:58.41	52	2:03.86	42	4:02.27	39

Men's slalom

Athlete	Classification		Final					
Athlete	Time	Rank	Time 1	Rank	Time 2	Rank	Total	Rank
Spyros Theodorou	DNF	–	DNF	–	–	–	DNF	–
Georgios Tambouris	2:25.59	5	DNF	–	–	–	DNF	–
Panagiotis Alexandris	1:59.79	6	DNF	–	–	–	DNF	–

== Sources ==
- Official Olympic Reports
- Olympic Winter Games 1972, full results by sports-reference.com
