= Josef Hauser =

Josef Hauser may refer to:

- Josef Hauser (skier) (born 1940), Austrian Olympic skier
- Josef Hauser (water polo) (1910–1981), German water polo player
- Josef Hauser (zoologist) (1920–2004), Hungarian zoologist and priest
