= Steven Clifford (disambiguation) =

Steve, Steven or Stephen Clifford may refer to:

- Steven Clifford, Australian skier
- Stephen Clifford, Australian rules footballer
- Steve Clifford, American basketball coach
