= Toshimasa Furukawa =

Japanese alpine skier (born 1947)

Personal information
- Nationality: Japanese
- Born: 11 May 1947 (age 77); Esashi District, Hokkaido, Japan

Sport
- Sport: Alpine skiing

Toshimasa Furukawa (born 11 May 1947) is a Japanese alpine skier. He competed in the men's slalom at the 1972 Winter Olympics.
