= Hank Kashiwa =

American alpine skier (born 1949)

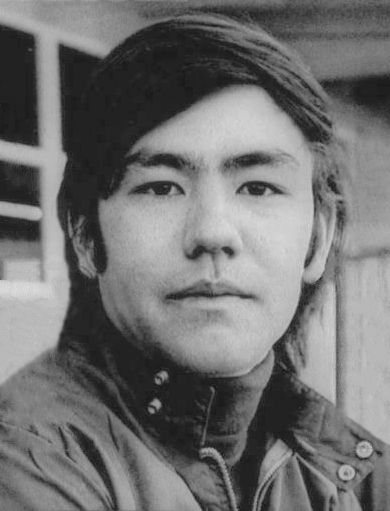
- Kashiwa in 1970

Personal information
- Born: May 26, 1949 (age 77) Old Forge, New York, U.S.
- Height: 5 ft 6.5 in (1.69 m)

Skiing career
- Sport: Alpine skiing
- Disciplines: Downhill, giant slalom, slalom

Olympics
- Teams: 1 – (1972)
- Medals: 0

World Championships
- Teams: 2 – (1970, 1972)
- Medals: 0

World Cup
- Seasons: 5 – (1968–1972)
- Podiums: 0 – (6 top tens)
- Overall titles: 0 – (34th in 1971)
- Discipline titles: 0 – (19th in GS, 1970)

Hank Charles Kashiwa (born May 26, 1949) is an American former World Cup alpine ski racer who competed in the 1972 Winter Olympics.

Kashiwa learned to ski on McCauley Mountain in his hometown of Old Forge, New York. He raced for the University of Colorado and was then a member of the U.S. Army ski team for two years. From 1967 to 1972, he was on the U.S. Ski Team, and won a national title in 1969. He was an alternate on the U.S. team at the 1968 Winter Olympics at Grenoble, France. Kashiwa skied the World Cup circuit from 1968 to 1971, where he posted six top ten finishes.

After racing for the U.S. Olympic team in 1972 at Sapporo in downhill and giant slalom, Kashiwa joined the pro circuit, and starred from 1972 to 1981, winning the World Pro Title in 1975.

After retiring from competitions Kashiwa had a long career as a ski commentator on TV. He also became the President of Volant skis, a Colorado ski manufacturer. After that he served as vice-president of marketing for the Yellowstone Club, near Big Sky, Montana.

== World Cup results ==
=== Season standings ===
Season	Age	Overall	Slalom	Giant Slalom	Super G	Downhill	Combined
1968	18	—	—	—	not run	—	not awarded
1969	19	48	25	—	not run	—	not awarded
1970	20	36	31	19	not run	—	not awarded
1971	21	34	21	—	not run	23	not awarded
1972	22	—	—	—	not run	—	not awarded

Points were only awarded for top ten finishes (see scoring system).

=== Top ten finishes ===
- 0 podiums; 6 top tens (1 DH, 1 GS, 4 SL)

Season	Date	Location	Discipline	Place
1969	22 Mar 1969	(United States) Waterville Valley, USA	Slalom	8th
1970	22 Feb 1970	(United States) Jackson Hole, USA	Slalom	8th
1970	8 Mar 1970	(United States) Heavenly Valley, USA	Giant slalom	5th
1971	16 Jan 1971	St. Moritz, Switzerland	Downhill	9th
1971	17 Jan 1971	St. Moritz, Switzerland	Slalom	7th
1971	30 Jan 1971	Megève, France	Slalom	9th

== World championship results ==
Year	Age	Slalom	Giant Slalom	Super-G	Downhill	Combined
1970	20	—	30	not run	—	—
1972	22	—	21	not run	25	—

From 1948 through 1980, the Winter Olympics were also the World Championships for alpine skiing.

== Olympic results ==
Year	Age	Slalom	Giant Slalom	Super-G	Downhill	Combined
1972	22	—	21	not run	25	not run
