= Ulrich Öhlböck =

Austrian cross-country skier

Personal information
- Nationality: Austrian
- Born: 10 July 1948 (age 76); Salzburg, Austria

Sport
- Sport: Cross-country skiing

Ulrich Öhlböck (born 10 July 1948) is an Austrian cross-country skier. He competed at the 1968 Winter Olympics and the 1972 Winter Olympics.
