= Bulgaria at the 1972 Winter Olympics =

- IOC code: BUL
- NOC: Bulgarian Olympic Committee
- Website: www.bgolympic.org (in Bulgarian and English)

in Sapporo
- Competitors: 4 in 2 sports
- Medals: Gold 0 Silver 0 Bronze 0 Total 0

Winter Olympics appearances (overview)
- 1936; 1948; 1952; 1956; 1960; 1964; 1968; 1972; 1976; 1980; 1984; 1988; 1992; 1994; 1998; 2002; 2006; 2010; 2014; 2018; 2022; 2026

Bulgaria competed at the 1972 Winter Olympics in Sapporo, Japan.

== Alpine skiing ==
Men

Athlete	Event	Race 1		Race 2		Total	
Athlete	Event	Time	Rank	Time	Rank	Time	Rank
Resmi Resmiev	Downhill					2:03.01	45
Ivan Penev	Downhill					2:02.16	40
Resmi Resmiev	Giant Slalom	1:45.68	45	1:54.14	37	3:39.82	37
Ivan Penev	Giant Slalom	1:41.77	38	1:45.56	32	3:27.33	32

Men's slalom

Athlete	Classification		Final					
Athlete	Time	Rank	Time 1	Rank	Time 2	Rank	Total	Rank
Ivan Penev	1:53.24	5	1:06.84	39	1:02.84	27	2:09.68	27
Resmi Resmiev	DSQ	–	1:05.82	37	1:05.28	29	2:11.10	29

== Cross-country skiing ==
Men

Event	Athlete	Race	
Event	Athlete	Time	Rank
15 km	Ventseslav Stoyanov	50:54.98	53
15 km	Petar Pankov	50:06.74	47
30 km	Ventseslav Stoyanov	1'47:11.68	46
30 km	Petar Pankov	1'45:50.66	39
50 km	Ventseslav Stoyanov	DNF	–
50 km	Petar Pankov	2'57:12.15	28
