= Masayoshi Kashiwagi =

Japanese alpine skier (born 1949)

Personal information
- Nationality: Japanese
- Born: 23 February 1949 (age 76); Hokkaido, Japan

Sport
- Sport: Alpine skiing

Masayoshi Kashiwagi (born 23 February 1949) is a Japanese alpine skier. He competed in two events at the 1972 Winter Olympics.
