= Roland Thöni =

Italian alpine skier (1951–2021)

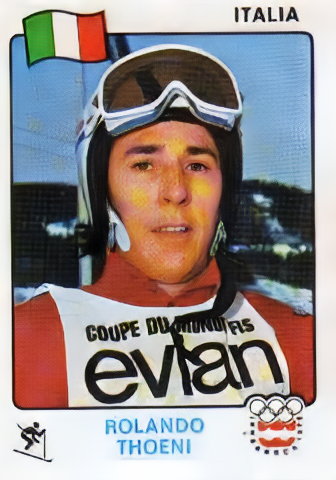

Personal information
- Born: 17 January 1951 Trafoi, Italy
- Died: 4 April 2021 (aged 70) Bolzano, Italy

Skiing career
- Sport: Alpine skiing
- Club: Fiamme Gialle
- Retired: 1976
- World Cup debut: 1970

Olympics
- Medals: 1 (0 gold)

World Cup
- Wins: 2
- Podiums: 3
- Overall titles: 0 (7th in 1972)
- Discipline titles: 0 (3rd in 1972 SL)
Medal record
Men's alpine skiing
Representing Italy
World Cup race podiums
Event	1st	2nd	3rd
Slalom	2	0	0
Giant slalom	0	0	1
Total	2	0	1
Olympic Games
Bronze medal – third place	1972 Sapporo	Slalom

Roland Thöni (sometimes listed as Rolando Thoeni; 17 January 1951 – 4 April 2021) was an Italian alpine ski racer. A cousin of Gustav Thöni, Roland competed on the World Cup circuit during the 1970s.

== Biography ==
Roland Thöni was born in Trafoi, a frazione of Stilfs (South Tyrol). His World Cup debut on 7 February 1971 was a top ten finish; he took seventh place in the slalom at Mürren, Switzerland.

His best year was 1972, which he opened with a bronze medal in the slalom at the Winter Olympics in Sapporo, finishing behind his cousin Gustav and Francisco Fernández Ochoa, the gold medalist from Spain. In mid-March 1972, Thöni also obtained his only two World cup victories; he won the slaloms at Madonna di Campiglio and Pra-Loup on consecutive days.

He did not reach the podium in the following World Cup seasons. His last international race was the downhill at the 1976 Winter Olympics, won by Franz Klammer.

== World cup ==
=== All top 10 results ===
Race date	Place	Discipline	Position
18-03-1972	(France) Pra Loup	Slalom	1st
17-03-1972	(Italy) Madonna di Campiglio	Slalom	1st
16-03-1972	(Italy) Val Gardena	Giant slalom	3rd
19-12-1971	(Italy) Sestriere	Slalom	4th
12-01-1975	(Switzerland) Wengen	Combined	5th
23-01-1972	(Switzerland) Wengen	Slalom	5th
28-01-1973	(Austria) Kitzbuehel	Slalom	6th
16-01-1972	(Austria) Kitzbuehel	Slalom	6th
21-03-1975	(Italy) Val Gardena	Downhill	7th
07-02-1971	(Switzerland) Muerren	Slalom	7th
15-03-1972	(Italy) Val Gardena	Downhill	8th
14-01-1973	(Switzerland) Wengen	Slalom	10th

=== Victories ===
Date	Location	Race
17 March 1972	(Italy) Madonna di Campiglio	Slalom
18 March 1972	(France) Pra-Loup	Slalom

== See also ==
- Italy national alpine ski team at the Olympics
