= Sven Mikaelsson =

Swedish alpine skier (born 1943)

Sven Göran Mikaelsson (born 5 December 1943 in Tärnaby) is a Swedish former alpine skier who competed in the 1972 Winter Olympics, finishing 28th in the men's giant slalom and 21st in the men's slalom.
