= Antonia Mayr =

Austrian luger

Personal information
- Nationality: Austrian
- Born: 8 September 1949 (age 76) St Johann im Pongau, Austria

Sport
- Sport: Luge

Antonia Mayr (born 8 September 1949) is an Austrian luger. She competed at the 1972 Winter Olympics and the 1976 Winter Olympics.
