= Werner Mattle =

Swiss alpine skier (born 1949)

Medal record

Representing Switzerland

Men's Alpine skiing

Olympic Games
Bronze medal – third place	1972 Sapporo	Giant Slalom

Werner Mattle (born 6 November 1949) is a Swiss former alpine skier and Olympic medalist. He received a bronze medal in the giant slalom at the 1972 Winter Olympics in Sapporo.
