= Ventseslav Stoyanov =

Bulgarian cross-country skier (born 1946)

Personal information
- Nationality: Bulgarian
- Born: 18 February 1946 (age 79)

Sport
- Sport: Cross-country skiing

Ventseslav Stoyanov (born 18 February 1946) is a Bulgarian cross-country skier. He competed in the men's 15 kilometre event at the 1972 Winter Olympics.
