= Heinrich Wallner =

Austrian cross-country skier

Personal information
- Nationality: Austrian
- Born: 24 February 1941 (age 84) St. Johann in Tirol, Nazi Germany

Sport
- Sport: Cross-country skiing

Heinrich Wallner (born 24 February 1941) is an Austrian cross-country skier. He competed at the 1968 Winter Olympics, the 1972 Winter Olympics and the 1976 Winter Olympics.
