= Chia Kuo-liang =

Taiwanese alpine skier (born 1950)

Personal information
- Nationality: Taiwanese
- Born: 13 December 1950 (age 74)

Sport
- Sport: Alpine skiing

Chia Kuo-liang (born 13 December 1950) is a Taiwanese alpine skier. He competed in two events at the 1972 Winter Olympics.
