= Panagiotis Alexandris =

Greek alpine skier (born 1949)

Personal information
- Nationality: Greek
- Born: 15 August 1949 (age 75)

Sport
- Sport: Alpine skiing

Panagiotis Alexandris (born 15 August 1949) is a Greek alpine skier. He competed in two events at the 1972 Winter Olympics.
