= Haruhisa Chiba =

Japanese alpine skier (1951–2006)

Personal information
- Nationality: Japanese
- Born: 3 June 1951; Hokkaido, Japan
- Died: 8 February 2006 (aged 54)

Sport
- Sport: Alpine skiing

Haruhisa Chiba (3 June 1951 – 8 February 2006) was a Japanese alpine skier. He competed at the 1972 Winter Olympics and the 1976 Winter Olympics.
