= 1972 Winter Olympics medal table =

1972 Winter Olympics medals
- Location: Sapporo, Japan

Highlights
- Most gold medals: Soviet Union (8)
- Most total medals: Soviet Union (16)
- Medalling NOCs: 17

The 1972 Winter Olympics, officially known as the XI Olympic Winter Games, was a winter multi-sport event held in Sapporo, Japan, from 3 to 13 February 1972. A total of 1,006 athletes representing 35 National Olympic Committees (NOCs) participated in 35 events from 10 different sports and disciplines.

Seventeen NOCs won at least one medal and fourteen of them collected at least one gold. The Soviet Union finished at the top of the gold and overall medal counts with 8 and 16, respectively. Along with Norway, the Soviet team also won the most silver medals (5). East Germany, which ended the Games behind the Soviet Union with 14 medals, secured the most bronzes (7). The host nation, Japan, won a record total of three medals (one of each color), which included its first Winter Olympics gold medal.

Three NOCs won a single medal: Canada (silver), Poland and Spain (gold). For the last two, these were their first-ever gold medals at the Winter Olympics, and in the case of Spain, it was its first medal. This was Canada's weakest result since the 1936 Winter Olympics, when its athletes also brought home a single silver medal. The NOCs from the Republic of China and the Philippines sent athletes to the Winter Olympics for the first time, but failed to win any medals.

== Highlights ==
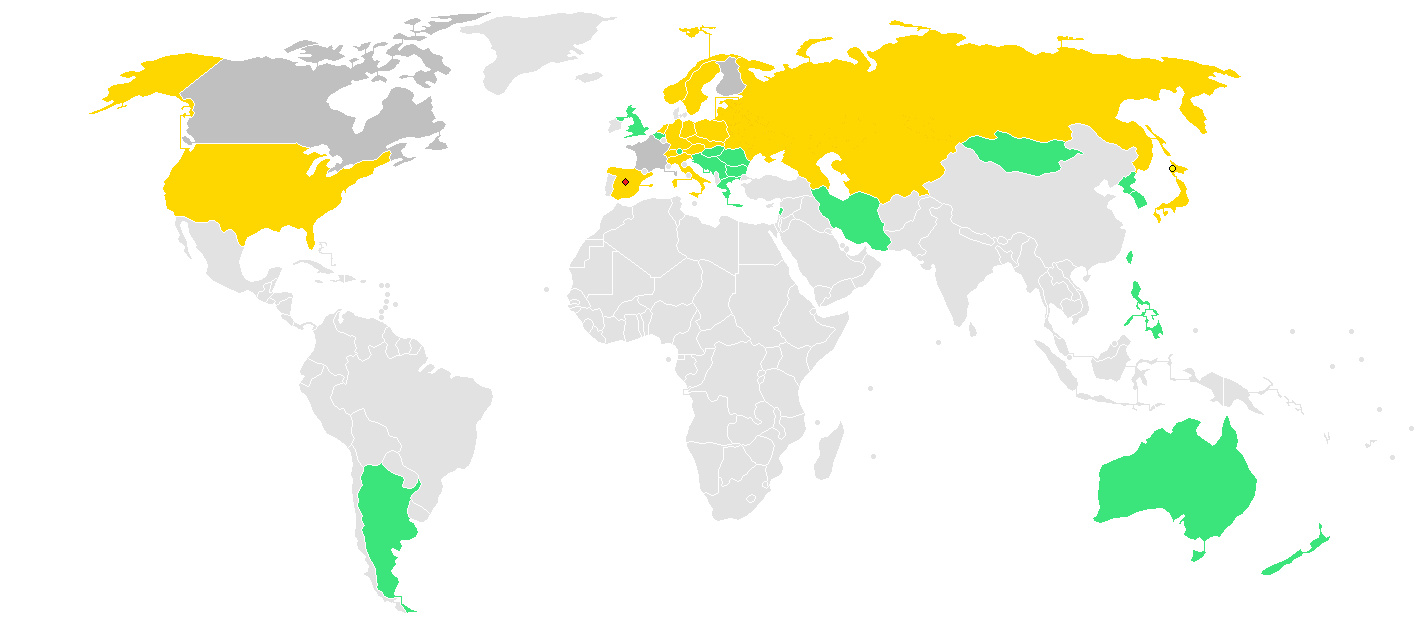
1972 Winter Olympic Games Medals map Legend: Gold represents countries that won at least one gold medal Silver represents countries that won at least one silver medal Bronze represents countries that won at least one bronze medal Green represents countries that did not win any medals Grey represents countries that did not participate

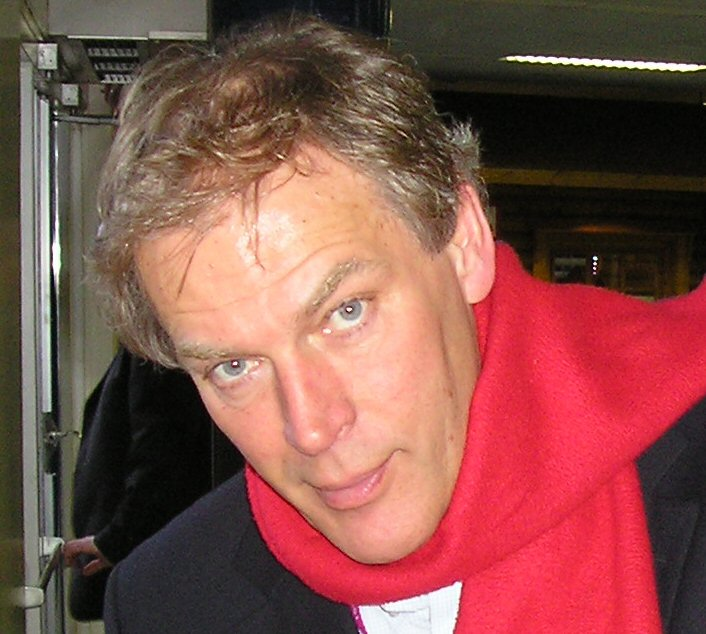
Ard Schenk won three of the four gold that the Netherlands obtained in speed skating.

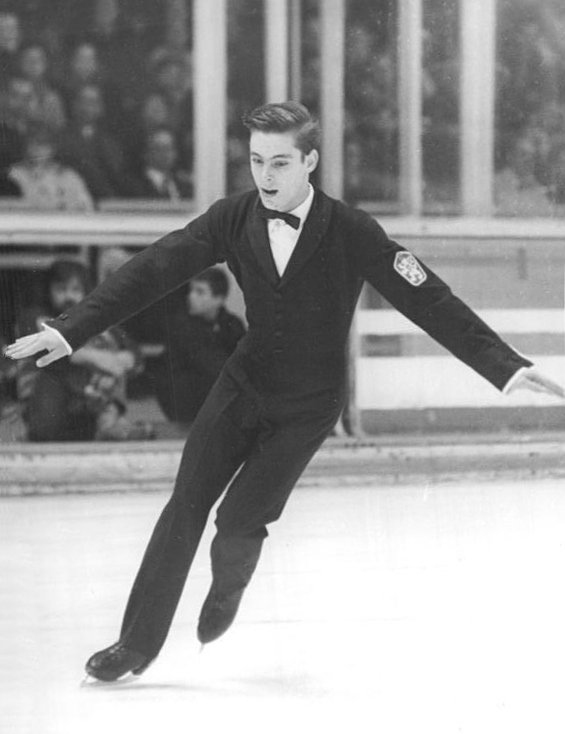
Ondrej Nepela won for Czechoslovakia its second and last Winter Olympics gold medal.

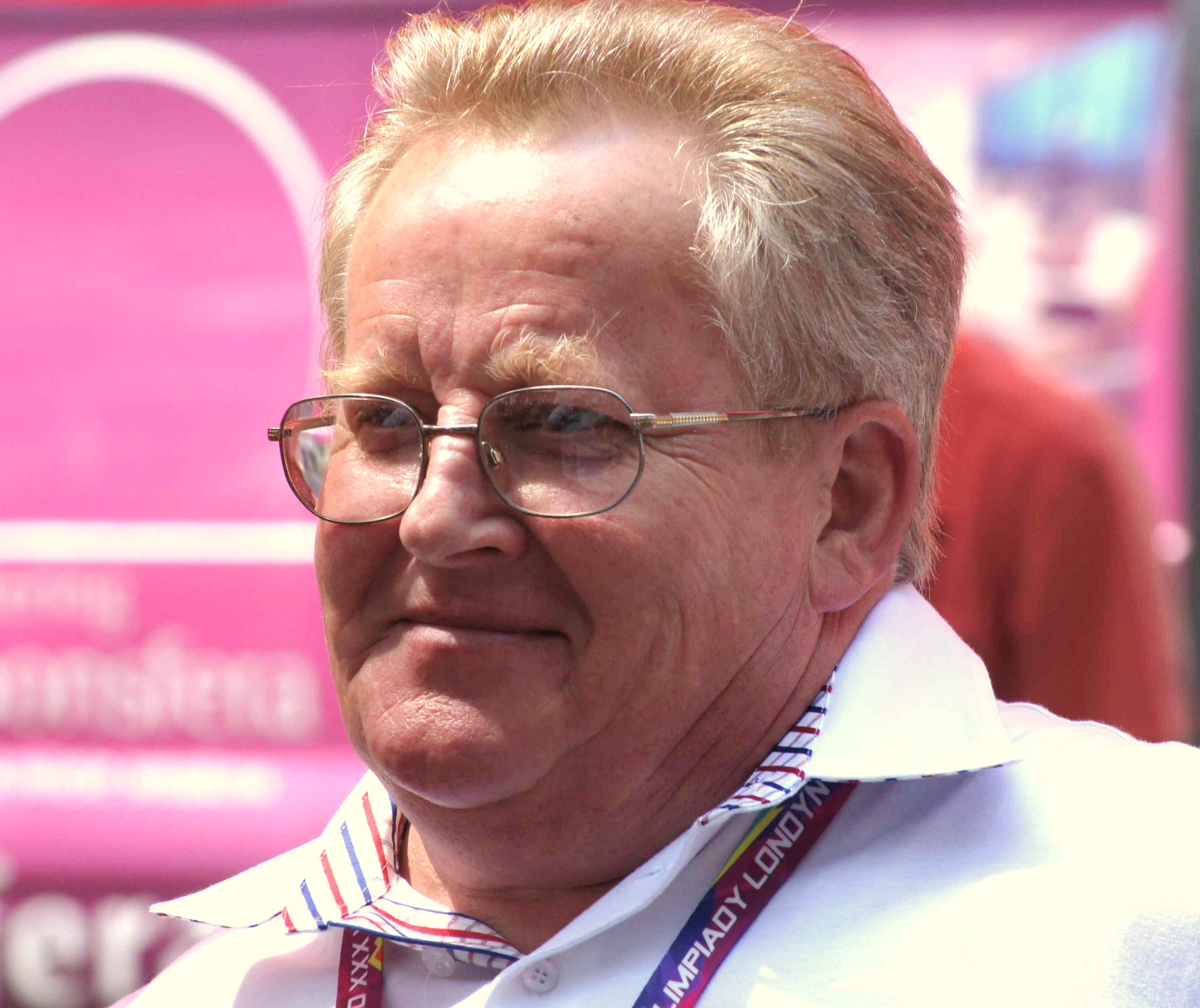
Wojciech Fortuna (ski jumper), Poland's first Winter Olympics gold medalist

Hosting the Olympic Winter Games for the first time, Japan's record consisted of a single medal: a silver in alpine skiing at the 1956 Winter Olympics. In Sapporo, Yukio Kasaya, Akitsugu Konno, and Seiji Aochi won the ski jumping normal hill (70 m) gold, silver, and bronze medal, respectively. Kasaya's gold was Japan's first-ever at the Winter Games. This result would persist as the country's best for the next 20 years.

Wojciech Fortuna of Poland won the ski jumping's large hill (90 m) event, while Spain's Francisco Fernández Ochoa prevailed in the alpine skiing's men's slalom, thus becoming their respective countries' first Winter Olympic champions. Ochoa's gold medal was also Spain's first medal at the Winter Games. Karen Magnussen's silver in the figure skating singles competition was Canada's sole medal and reflected what was the NOC's weakest performance since the 1936 Winter Games. For the first time in its history, a delegation from Finland concluded its participation at the Winter Olympics without gold medals.

Six Soviet Union medals were won by two cross-country skiers: Galina Kulakova, who took gold in both women's individual distances and in the relay event; and Vyacheslav Vedenin, who won the 30 km—becoming the first Soviet skier to win an individual Olympic title—and the relay events, and came third in the 50 km. East German lugers won eight medals for their NOC by taking every medal in the men's and women's singles, and placing two teams in the top three of the doubles event. Paul Hildgartner and Walter Plaikner of Italy were the only non-East German athletes to win a luge medal, as they shared the doubles gold with Horst Hörnlein and Reinhard Bredow. Italy's other gold medal was won by Gustav Thöni in the men's giant slalom; he also took silver in the men's slalom, thus contributing two of his country's five medals. Marie-Theres Nadig skied her way to victory in the women's downhill and giant slalom events, winning half of Switzerland's gold medals and helping her country achieve its best result at that time.^{[n 1]} Two-time world figure skating champion Ondrej Nepela added the Olympic men's singles title to his career and guaranteed Czechoslovakia's second and last gold medal in its Winter Olympics history.

Half of the United States' eight medals were obtained in women's speed skating: Anne Henning won a gold in the 500 m and a bronze in the 1000 m, while Dianne Holum grabbed a gold in the 1500 m and a silver in the 3000 m. Also in this discipline, Ard Schenk (three golds), Stien Baas-Kaiser (one gold and one silver), Atje Keulen-Deelstra (one silver and two bronzes), and Kees Verkerk (one silver) were responsible for all nine medals for the Netherlands. This was the best performance by a Dutch delegation at the Winter Olympics,^{[n 2]} and it took 26 years to be improved, when the Games returned to Japan.

== Medal table ==
The medal table is based on information provided by the International Olympic Committee (IOC) and is consistent with IOC convention in its published medal tables. The table uses the Olympic medal table sorting method. By default, the table is ordered by the number of gold medals the athletes from a nation have won, where a nation is an entity represented by a National Olympic Committee (NOC). The number of silver medals is taken into consideration next, and then the number of bronze medals. If teams are still tied, equal ranking is given and they are listed alphabetically by their IOC country code.

In the doubles event in luge, two gold medals were awarded for a first place tie and, consequently, no silver medal was awarded. This explains the 36 gold and 34 silver medals distributed during the Games.

* Host nation (Japan)

Rank	Nation	Gold	Silver	Bronze	Total
1	Soviet Union	8	5	3	16
2	East Germany	4	3	7	14
3	Switzerland	4	3	3	10
4	Netherlands	4	3	2	9
5	United States	3	2	3	8
6	West Germany	3	1	1	5
7	Norway	2	5	5	12
8	Italy	2	2	1	5
9	Austria	1	2	2	5
10	Sweden	1	1	2	4
11	Japan*	1	1	1	3
12	Czechoslovakia	1	0	2	3
13	Poland	1	0	0	1
13	Spain	1	0	0	1
15	Finland	0	4	1	5
16	France	0	1	2	3
17	Canada	0	1	0	1
Totals (17 entries)		36	34	35	105

== Notes ==
1. Switzerland also collected a total of 10 medals at the 1948 Winter Olympics in St. Moritz, but it won only three golds versus the four obtained in Sapporo.
2. The Netherlands summed nine medals in Sapporo, just like at the 1968 Winter Olympics, but won four golds, one more than in Grenoble.

== See also ==
- 1972 Summer Olympics medal table
