= Masami Ichimura =

Japanese alpine skier (born 1950)

Personal information
- Nationality: Japanese
- Born: 29 December 1950 (age 75) Minakami, Gunma, Japan

Sport
- Sport: Alpine skiing

Masami Ichimura (市村 政美, Ichimura Masami; born 29 December 1950) is a Japanese alpine skier. He competed at the 1972 Winter Olympics and the 1976 Winter Olympics.
