= Wang Cheng-che =

Taiwanese alpine skier (born 1949)

Personal information
- Nationality: Taiwanese
- Born: 22 April 1949 (age 76)

Sport
- Sport: Alpine skiing

Wang Cheng-che (born 22 April 1949) is a Taiwanese alpine skier. He competed in two events at the 1972 Winter Olympics.
