= Iain Finlayson (alpine skier) =

British alpine skier (1951–1991)

Personal information
- Nationality: British
- Born: 19 December 1951
- Died: 10 December 1991 (aged 39)

Sport
- Sport: Alpine skiing

Iain Finlayson (19 December 1951 – 10 December 1991) was a British alpine skier. He competed in three events at the 1972 Winter Olympics.
