= Back-Up Trust =

British health charity

The Back Up Trust
- Formation: 1986
- Type: Charitable organisation
- Registration no.: England & Wales (1072216); Scotland (SC040577)
- Location: 4 Knightley Walk, London, SW18 4LS, UK.
- Region served: United Kingdom
- Revenue: £1.6m (2017)
- Website: www.backuptrust.org.uk

The Back-Up Trust is a UK charity that supports people affected by spinal cord injury.

== History ==
The charity was founded in 1986 and was initially set up to offer ski courses for those affected by spinal cord injury. In 1988, it formed a partnership with The Calvert Trust and began to expand its courses to challenge and empower people to get 'back up' to a place they were at before their accident. By 2010 the charity was involved in adventure holidays for people with spinal cord injuries. The charity is involved with wheelchair skills training.

In 2003 the charity joined up with five other spinal cord injury organisations in the UK to launch the Spinal Injuries Together (SIT) initiative. In 2017 the charity reported an annual income of £1.6 million.
