= Konrad Bartelski =

British alpine skier

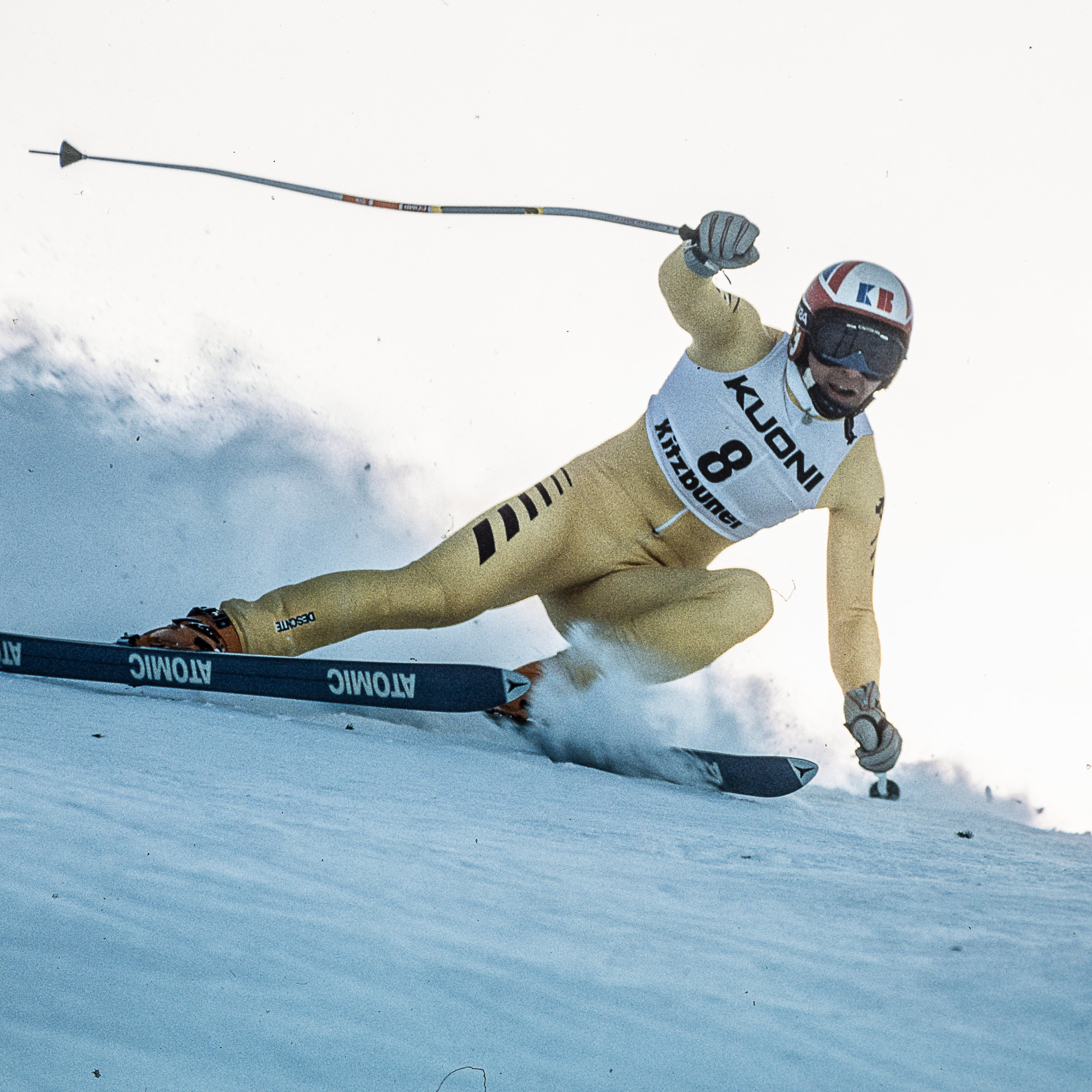

Personal information
- Nationality: United Kingdom
- Born: 27 May 1954 (age 72)

Sport
- Sport: Skiing

Konrad Bartelski (born 27 May 1954) is a former British alpine ski racer who produced the then best result by a Briton on the Alpine Skiing World Cup circuit in 1981 by coming within 0.11 seconds of winning a World Cup downhill race at Val Gardena. He remains the only British male skier to finish on the podium in a World Cup downhill race.

== Early career ==
Bartelski, born in London, grew up in the Netherlands and is of Polish and English origin. He competed at his first Olympics at the 1972 Winter Games in Sapporo at the age of just 17. Two years later, he finished 15th at the 1974 World Championships.

In February 1975, he had a dramatic and spectacular fall during the downhill race at Megève and suffered a concussion and a broken nose which kept him out of action for several weeks. He failed to feature in the top placings for the next five years until finishing 12th at the 1980 Winter Olympics in Lake Placid.

== Biggest success ==
Bartelski stunned the skiing world during his performance at the World Cup at Val Gardena, Italy on 13 December 1981 when he finished the downhill in 2 minutes 07.52 seconds, just 0.11 behind the race winner Austria's Erwin Resch.

Britain had never produced a successful male downhill racer, and Bartelski's performance resulted in the French television commentator saying, "Ce n'est pas possible! C'est un anglais" ("It's not possible, It's an Englishman").

The second placing result remained the highest placing by a Briton in any World Cup race, until it was equalled by Dave Ryding in the 2017 Kitzbühel World Cup Slalom and then surpassed by Ryding in the 2022 Kitzbühel World Cup Slalom.

== After Val Gardena ==
British television viewers began to tune in more regularly to Ski Sunday each week to follow the performances of a surprise hero, but Bartelski failed to improve on his biggest result. He finished 7th in Schladming in February 1982 and also had a 13th place and two 15th-place finishes during that winter season. He ended the season ranked 19th in the World Cup standings.

He retired from World Cup races in 1983.

== Later career ==
Towards the end of his career, Bartelski began to make appearances in the commentary box for Ski Sunday on BBC television, the programme which gained him his fame in his home country.

He also worked for Sky Television on the Ford Ski Report and Great Escapes and for BBC Radio 5 Live and several broadsheet UK newspapers including The Guardian, Daily Mail, Sunday Telegraph, Sunday Times and The Times.

For 10 years he was a director of Badger Sports, a Winter Sports distributor with a £1.90 million turnover.

In the late 1990s, he switched to behind the television cameras, as an assistant producer for Trans World International (TWI) and moved to Octagon CSI in 2001. By 2003 he moved to ESPN Classic Sport, broadcasting in Italy and France and later the United Kingdom.

== Personal life ==
He is the son of a Polish father and English mother. His father, Jan, escaped the Invasion of Poland and the Katyn massacre and eventually arrived in England and enlisted in the RAF. After the war he worked as a pilot for KLM.

Konrad was educated in the Netherlands and speaks fluent German and Dutch. He is married to Shauna and has one daughter. He is also a charity worker: since 1997 he has been involved with Back Up, a charity helping people paralysed through spinal cord injury, serving terms as president and chairman. He is Chairman of Selectors for the British Ski and Snowboard Federation, and a fund-raiser for Christies’ British Ski Team Appeal Auction.
