= Josef Hauser (skier) =

Austrian cross-country skier (born 1940)

Personal information
- Nationality: Austrian
- Born: 29 February 1940 (age 85)

Sport
- Sport: Cross-country skiing

Josef Hauser (born 29 February 1940) is an Austrian cross-country skier. He competed in the men's 30 kilometre event at the 1972 Winter Olympics.
