= Royston Varley =

British alpine skier (born 1952)

Personal information
- Nationality: British
- Born: 27 January 1952 (age 74)

Sport
- Sport: Alpine skiing
Medal record
Commonwealth Winter Games
Silver medal – second place	1970 St Moritz	Men's Slalom
Gold medal – first place	1970 St Moritz	Men's Giant Slalom

Royston Varley (born 27 January 1952) is a British alpine skier. He competed in three events at the 1972 Winter Olympics.
