= David Currier =

American alpine skier (born 1952)

David Currier (born April 20, 1952, in Madison, New Hampshire) is an American retired alpine skier who competed in the 1972 Winter Olympics.
