= Hwang Wei-chung =

Taiwanese alpine skier (born 1951)

Personal information
- Nationality: Taiwanese
- Born: 2 February 1951 (age 74)

Sport
- Sport: Alpine skiing

Hwang Wei-chung (born 2 February 1951) is a Taiwanese alpine skier. He competed in two events at the 1972 Winter Olympics.
