= Sergey Grishchenko =

Soviet alpine skier (1947–2000)

Personal information
- Nationality: Soviet
- Born: 4 April 1947; Murmansk, Soviet Union
- Died: 28 December 2000 (aged 53)

Sport
- Sport: Alpine skiing

Sergey Grishchenko (4 April 1947 – 28 December 2000) was a Soviet alpine skier. He competed in three events at the 1972 Winter Olympics.
