= Georgios Tambouris =

Greek alpine skier (born 1952)

Personal information
- Nationality: Greek
- Born: 8 November 1952 (age 72)

Sport
- Sport: Alpine skiing

Georgios Tambouris (born 8 November 1952) is a Greek alpine skier. He competed in two events at the 1972 Winter Olympics.
