= Spain at the 1972 Winter Olympics =

- IOC code: ESP
- NOC: Spanish Olympic Committee
- Website: www.coe.es (in Spanish)

in Sapporo
- Competitors: 3 (2 men, 1 woman) in 1 sport
- Flag bearer: Francisco Fernández Ochoa
- Medals Ranked 13th: Gold 1 Silver 0 Bronze 0 Total 1

Winter Olympics appearances (overview)
- 1936; 1948; 1952; 1956; 1960; 1964; 1968; 1972; 1976; 1980; 1984; 1988; 1992; 1994; 1998; 2002; 2006; 2010; 2014; 2018; 2022; 2026

Spain competed at the 1972 Winter Olympics in Sapporo, Japan.

== Medalists ==
Francisco Fernández Ochoa won the first ever Winter Games medal for Spain.

Medal	Name	Sport	Event
Gold	Francisco Fernández Ochoa	Alpine skiing	Men's slalom

== Alpine skiing ==
Men

Athlete	Event	Race 1		Race 2		Total	
Athlete	Event	Time	Rank	Time	Rank	Time	Rank
Francisco Fernández Ochoa	Giant Slalom	DSQ	–	–	–	DSQ	–
Aurelio García	Giant Slalom	1:37.28	27	1:42.45	25	3:19.73	25

Men's slalom

Athlete	Classification		Final					
Athlete	Time	Rank	Time 1	Rank	Time 2	Rank	Total	Rank
Aurelio García	1:43.39	1	57.61	14	55.51	14	1:53.12	12
Francisco Fernández Ochoa	bye		55.36	1	53.91	2	1:49.27	1st place, gold medalist(s)

Women

Athlete	Event	Race 1		Race 2		Total	
Athlete	Event	Time	Rank	Time	Rank	Time	Rank
Conchita Puig	Downhill					1:42.37	29
Conchita Puig	Giant Slalom					DSQ	–
Conchita Puig	Slalom	DNF	–	–	–	DNF	–
