= Adolf Rösti =

Swiss alpine skier (born 1947)

Adolf Rösti (born 30 August 1947 in Bern, Switzerland) is a Swiss former alpine skier who competed in the 1972 Winter Olympics.

== Awards ==
- Best place in the general classification: 12th in 1973
- 4 podiums (all in giant slalom):
  - 3 second places
  - 1 third place
