= Chen Yun-ming =

Taiwanese alpine skier (born 1949)

Chen Yun-ming 陳雲銘
Personal information
- Nationality: Taiwanese
- Born: 10 February 1949
- Died: 15 June 2016 (aged 67)

Sport
- Sport: Alpine skiing

Chen Yun-ming (10 February 1949 - 15 June 2016) was a Taiwanese alpine skier. He competed at the 1972 Winter Olympics and the 1976 Winter Olympics.
