= Jorge-Emilio Lazzarini =

Argentine alpine skier (born 1955)

Personal information
- Nationality: Argentine
- Born: 23 February 1955 (age 70)

Sport
- Sport: Alpine skiing

Jorge-Emilio Lazzarini (born 23 February 1955) is an Argentine alpine skier. He competed in three events at the 1972 Winter Olympics.
