= Manni Thofte =

Swedish alpine skier (born 1953)

Finn Manni Kieding Thofte (born 28 June 1953 in Högdalen) is a Swedish former alpine skier who competed in the 1972 Winter Olympics.
