= Derek Robbins =

Canadian alpine skier (born 1952)

Derek Robbins (born 4 January 1952) is a Canadian former alpine skier who competed in the 1972 Winter Olympics.
