= Alfred Hagn =

German alpine skier (1948–2020)

Alfred Hagn (18 February 1948, in Fischbachau – 11 April 2020) was a German alpine skier who competed in the 1968 Winter Olympics and 1972 Winter Olympics. He died 11 April 2020.
