= Hansjörg Schlager =

German alpine skier (1948–2004)

Hansjörg Schlager (20 August 1948 in Langenau – 10 March 2004 in Titisee-Neustadt) was a German alpine skier who competed in the 1972 Winter Olympics.

In 2002 he was diagnosed with amyotrophic lateral sclerosis and died two years later aged 55.
