= Resmi Resmiev =

Bulgarian alpine skier (1947–2020)

Personal information
- Nationality: Bulgarian
- Born: 19 June 1947; Sofia, Bulgaria
- Died: November 2020 (aged 63)

Sport
- Sport: Alpine skiing

Resmi Resmiev (Bulgarian: Ресми Ресмиев Румен Руменов, 19 June 1947 – 9 November 2020) was a Bulgarian alpine skier. He competed in three events at the 1972 Winter Olympics.

Resmi Resmiev was born in Samokov, Bulgaria, and was forced to change his name to Roumen Roumenov (Румен Руменов) in 1985 as part of the so called "Revival Process" aiming at Bulgarianize all names of bulgarian citizen.
