= Chris Womersley (alpine skier) =

New Zealand alpine skier (born 1949)

Christopher Peter Womersley (born 7 January 1949) is an alpine skier from New Zealand.

He competed for New Zealand at the 1972 Winter Olympics at Sapporo, and came 41st in the downhill and 35th in the giant slalom, but did not qualify in the slalom. He went to the 1968 Winter Olympics at Grenoble, but did not compete.

He is a brother of 1960 alpine skier Cecilia Womersley.
