= Aurelio García =

Spanish skier (born 1947)

Personal information
- Nationality: Spanish
- Born: 7 March 1947 (age 78); Madrid, Spain

Sport
- Sport: Alpine skiing

Aurelio García (born 7 March 1947) is a Spanish alpine skier. He competed at the 1968 Winter Olympics and the 1972 Winter Olympics. García was the flag bearer for Spain in the opening ceremony of the 1968 Winter Olympics.
