= Carlos Perner =

Argentine alpine skier (born 1947)

Personal information
- Born: 1 October 1947 (age 77); San Carlos de Bariloche, Argentina

Sport
- Sport: Alpine skiing

Carlos Perner (born 1 October 1947) is an Argentine alpine skier. He competed at the 1964 Winter Olympics and the 1972 Winter Olympics.
