= Ghorban Ali Kalhor =

Iranian alpine skier (born 1952)

Personal information
- Nationality: Iranian
- Born: 9 October 1952 (age 72)

Sport
- Sport: Alpine skiing

Ghorban Ali Kalhor (born 9 October 1952) is an Iranian alpine skier. He competed at the 1972 Winter Olympics and the 1976 Winter Olympics.
