= Virgil Brenci =

Romanian alpine skier (born 1947)

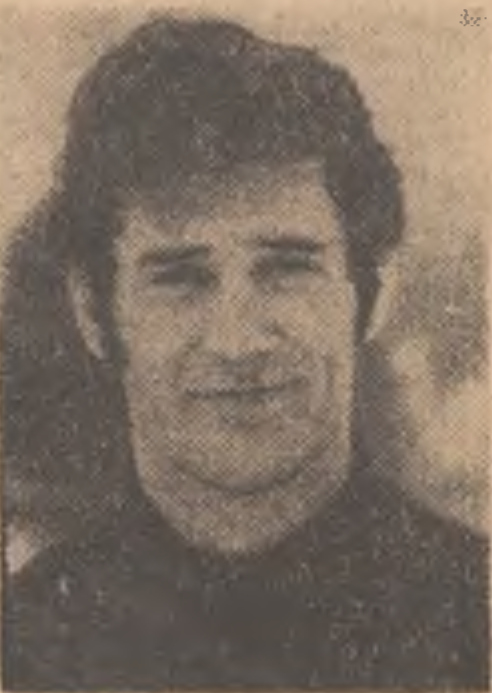
- Brenci in 1971

Personal information
- Nationality: Romanian
- Born: 2 January 1947 (age 79)

Sport
- Sport: Alpine skiing

Virgil Brenci (born 2 January 1947) is a Romanian alpine skier. He competed in three events at the 1972 Winter Olympics.
