= Feizollah Bandali =

Iranian alpine skier (born 1939)

Personal information
- Nationality: Iranian
- Born: 20 June 1939 (age 85); Shemshak, Iran

Sport
- Sport: Alpine skiing

Feizollah Bandali (born 20 June 1939) is an Iranian alpine skier. He competed at the 1964, 1968 and the 1972 Winter Olympics.
