= Steven Clifford =

Australian alpine skier (born 1955)

Personal information
- Nationality: Australian
- Born: 6 May 1955 (age 70); Thredbo, New South Wales, Australia

Sport
- Sport: Alpine skiing

Steven Clifford (born 6 May 1955) is an Australian alpine skier. He competed in three events at the 1972 Winter Olympics.
