= Spyros Theodorou =

Greek alpine skier (born 1952)

Personal information
- Nationality: Greek
- Born: 25 June 1952 (age 74)

Sport
- Sport: Alpine skiing

Spyros Theodorou (born 25 June 1952) is a Greek alpine skier. He competed at the 1972 Winter Olympics and the 1976 Winter Olympics.
