= New Zealand at the 1972 Winter Olympics =

- IOC code: NZL
- NOC: New Zealand Olympic Committee
- Website: www.olympic.org.nz

in Sapporo
- Competitors: 2 (men) in 1 sport
- Flag bearer: Alan Ward
- Medals: Gold 0 Silver 0 Bronze 0 Total 0

Winter Olympics appearances (overview)
- 1952; 1956; 1960; 1964; 1968; 1972; 1976; 1980; 1984; 1988; 1992; 1994; 1998; 2002; 2006; 2010; 2014; 2018; 2022; 2026

New Zealand competed at the 1972 Winter Olympics in Sapporo, Japan. The country was represented by 2 athletes, Ross Ewington and Chris Womersley, both in the Alpine Skiing events. Womersley finished 41st, and Ewington 49th (out of 54 competitors) in Downhill. The flagbearer at the opening ceremony was Alan Ward the team Manager.

== Alpine skiing ==
Men

Athlete	Event	Race 1		Race 2		Total	
Athlete	Event	Time	Rank	Time	Rank	Time	Rank
Ross Ewington	Downhill					2:04.75	49
Chris Womersley	Downhill					2:02.24	41
Ross Ewington	Giant Slalom	DSQ	–	–	–	DSQ	–
Chris Womersley	Giant Slalom	1:41.65	37	1:48.78	35	3:30.43	35

Men's slalom

Athlete	Classification		Final					
Athlete	Time	Rank	Time 1	Rank	Time 2	Rank	Total	Rank
Chris Womersley	1:48.49	4	?	35	DNF	–	DNF	–
Ross Ewington	1:54.16	5	DNF	–	–	–	DNF	–
