= Ivan Penev =

Bulgarian alpine skier

Personal information
- Nationality: Bulgarian
- Born: 20 January 1950 (age 76)

Sport
- Sport: Alpine skiing

Ivan Penev (Bulgarian: Иван Пенев, born 20 January 1950) is a Bulgarian alpine skier. He competed at the 1972 Winter Olympics and the 1976 Winter Olympics. Penever participated in three events at each Olympics, with a best finish of 27th.

Penev was born in Samokov, where he grew up, and was trained by Mikhail Popangelov. During his career, he represented the clubs Rilski Sportist and CSKA September Flag and won several national championships; by age 26, he was also a four-time Balkan champion. He also won many local and regional tournaments.
