= Ross Ewington =

New Zealand alpine skier (1947–2016)

Ross Ewington (16 October 1947 – 31 March 2016) was an alpine skier from New Zealand. In the 1972 Winter Olympics at Sapporo, he came 49th in the Downhill, but was disqualified in the Slalom and did not finish in the Giant Slalom.
