= Francisco Fernández Ochoa =

Spanish alpine skier (1950–2006)

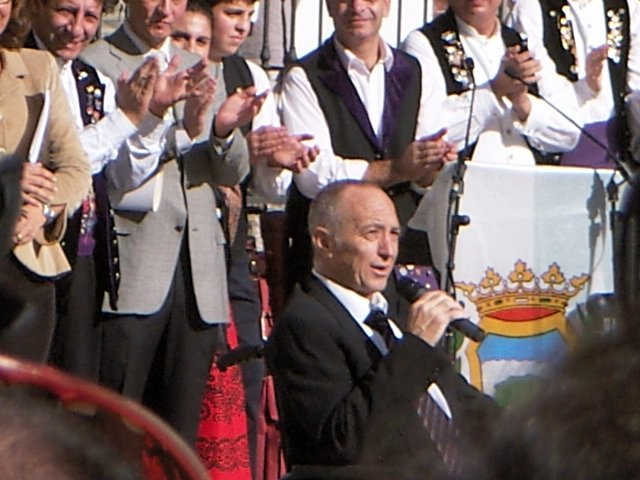
- Fernández Ochoa in October 2006

Personal information
- Born: 25 February 1950 Madrid, Spain
- Died: 6 November 2006 (aged 56) Cercedilla, Spain
- Height: 5 ft 7 in (1.70 m)

Skiing career
- Sport: Alpine skiing
- Club: Club de Esquí Arroyomolinos, Madrid
- Retired: April 1980 - (age 30)
- Disciplines: Downhill, giant slalom, slalom, combined
- World Cup debut: January 26, 1969 - (age 18)

Olympics
- Teams: 4 – (1968, 1972, 1976, 1980)
- Medals: 1 (1 gold)

World Championships
- Teams: 7 – (1968-1980) includes 4 Olympics
- Medals: 2 (1 gold)

World Cup
- Seasons: 12 – (1969–1980)
- Wins: 1 – (1 SL)
- Podiums: 4 – (2 SL, 2 K)
- Overall titles: 0 – (9th in 1975)
- Discipline titles: 0 - (7th in 1975, slalom)
Medal record
Men's alpine skiing
Representing Spain
Winter Olympics
Gold medal – first place	1972 Sapporo	Slalom
World Championships
Bronze medal – third place	1974 St. Moritz	Slalom

Francisco "Paquito" Fernández Ochoa (25 February 1950 – 6 November 2006) was a World Cup alpine ski racer from Spain. Born in Madrid and raised north of the city in Cercedilla, he was the eldest of eight children whose father ran a ski school. Paquito raced in all of the alpine disciplines and specialized in slalom.

At the age of 21, he won an Olympic gold medal in the slalom at the 1972 Winter Olympics in Sapporo, Japan. He is known for being the first Spaniard to win a gold medal at the Winter Olympics. His sister Blanca earned Spain its second medal at the Winter Olympics, 20 years after him, in the same discipline, slalom.

== Career ==
Fernández Ochoa made his international debut at age 17 at the 1968 Winter Olympics, where he finished 38th in the downhill and giant slalom, and 23rd in the slalom. His first top ten finish on the World Cup circuit was the following season, a sixth-place finish in the slalom at Megève, France, on January 26, 1969.

He was one of five siblings that raced for the Spanish alpine ski team and competed at the Winter Olympics (the others being his brothers Luís and Juan Manuel, and sisters Dolores and Blanca). Blanca was the only other Spanish alpine skier to win a medal at the Winter Olympics; she won the bronze in the women's slalom at the 1992 Winter Olympics in Albertville, France.

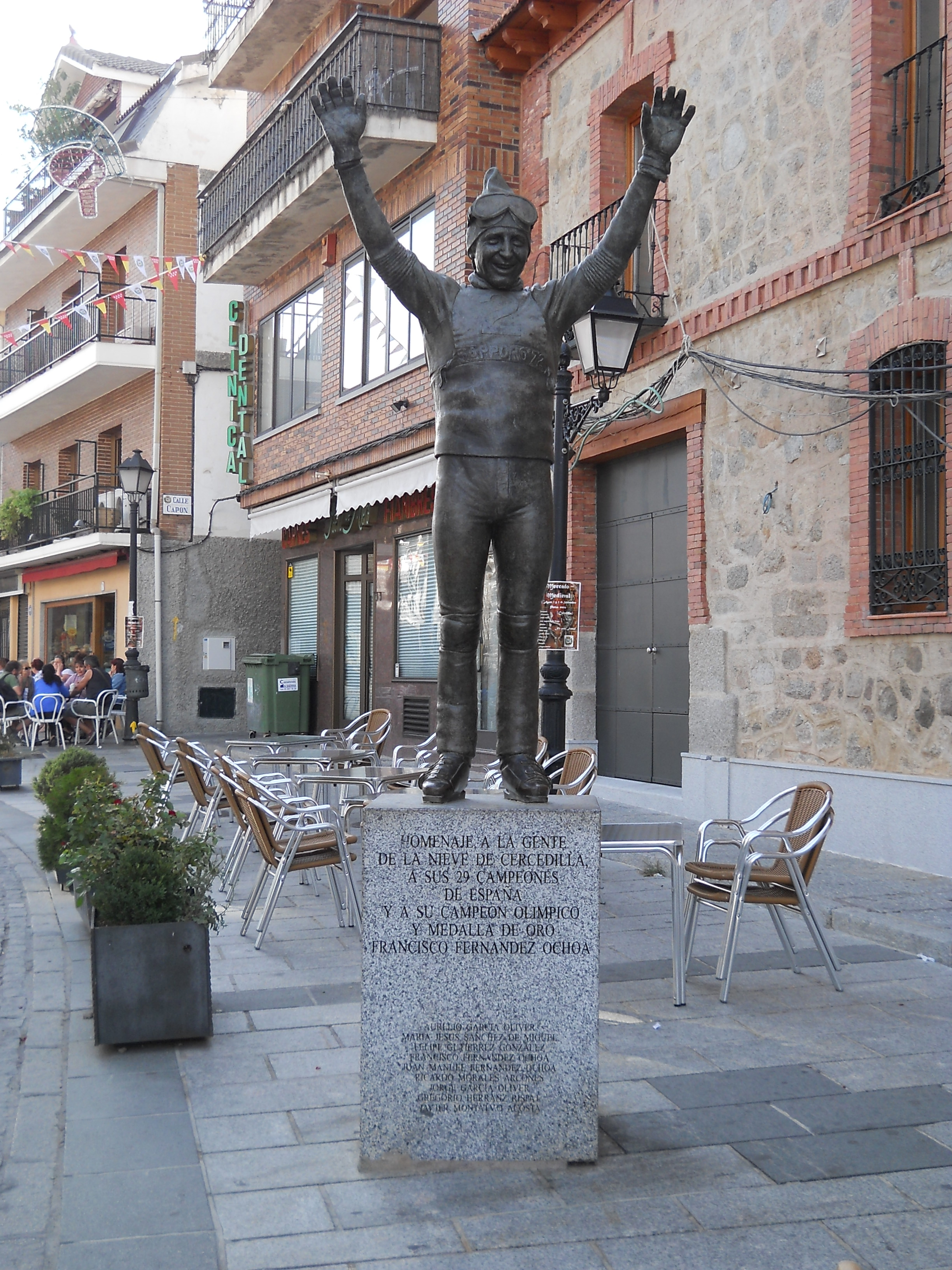
Statue of Fernández Ochoa in Cercedilla, Spain

Fernández Ochoa competed in four Winter Olympics (1968-80). He won only one World Cup race, a slalom in 1974 in Zakopane, Poland. Both of his career wins came over Gustav Thöni of Italy, the dominant technical ski racer of the early 1970s.

At the 1974 World Championships, Fernández Ochoa won a bronze medal in the slalom. His best season was 1975; he finished 9th in the overall standings and 7th in the slalom standings. He finished ninth in the slalom at the 1976 Winter Olympics.

Fernández Ochoa retired from international competition at age 30, following the 1980 World Cup season, and finished with four World Cup podiums (top 3) and 30 top ten finishes. He then raced for several seasons on the pro tour in North America.

Fernández Ochoa died of lymphatic cancer at age 56 in Cercedilla, Community of Madrid in November 2006. Less than two weeks before his death, a statue of him was erected in Cercedilla. He was survived by his wife María Jesús Vargas (m. 1973) and their three children: Bárbara, Paula, and Francisco.

Francisco Fernández Ochoa City Ice Rink in Valdemoro, Madrid and Francisco Fernández Ochoa City Sports Center in Carabanchel, Madrid were named in his honor.

== World Cup results ==
=== Season standings ===
Season	Age	Overall	Slalom	Giant Slalom	Super-G	Downhill	Combined
1969	18	38	20	—	not run	—	not awarded
1970	19	55	34	—	not run	—	not awarded
1971	20	39	19	—	not run	—	not awarded
1972	21	—	—	—	not run	—	not awarded
1973	22	34	18	27	not run	—	not awarded
1974	23	15	8	—	not run	—	not awarded
1975	24	9	7	—	not run	—	not awarded
1976	25	—	—	—	not run	—	—
1977	26	—	—	—	not run	—	—
1978	27	63	—	—	not run	—	19
1979	28	91	—	—	not run	—	—
1980	29	38	33	—	not run	—	5

Points were only awarded for top ten finishes thru 1979, top 15 thru 1991 (see scoring system).

=== Race podiums ===
- 1 win (1 SL)
- 4 podiums (2 SL, 2 K)

Season	Date	Location	Discipline	Place
1974	March 6, 1974	Zakopane, Poland	Slalom	1st
1974	March 10, 1974	Vysoké Tatry, Czechoslovakia	Slalom	3rd
1975	January 19, 1975	Kitzbühel, Austria	Combined	2nd
1975	February 1, 1975	Megève, France	Combined	2nd

== World Championship results ==
Year	Location	Age	Slalom	Giant Slalom	Super-G	Downhill	Combined
1968	Grenoble, France	17	23	38	not run	38	
1970	Val Gardena, Italy	19	9		not run		9
1972	Sapporo, Japan	21	1	DSQ1	not run	—	—
1974	St. Moritz, Switzerland	23	3		not run		
1976	Innsbruck, Austria	25	9	24	not run	35	6
1978	Garmisch, W. Germany	27			not run		
1980	Lake Placid, USA	29	22	22	not run	27	5

From 1948 through 1980, the Winter Olympics were also the World Championships for alpine skiing.
At the World Championships from 1954 through 1980, the combined was a "paper race" using the results of the three events (DH, GS, SL).

== Olympic results ==
Year	Location	Age	Slalom	Giant Slalom	Super-G	Downhill	Combined
1968	Grenoble, France	17	23	38	not run	38	not run
1972	Sapporo, Japan	21	1	DSQ1	not run	—	not run
1976	Innsbruck, Austria	25	9	24	not run	35	not run
1980	Lake Placid, USA	29	22	22	not run	27	not run

== See also ==
- List of flag bearers for Spain at the Olympics
- List of Olympic medalist families
