= Dan Cristea =

Romanian skier (born 1949)

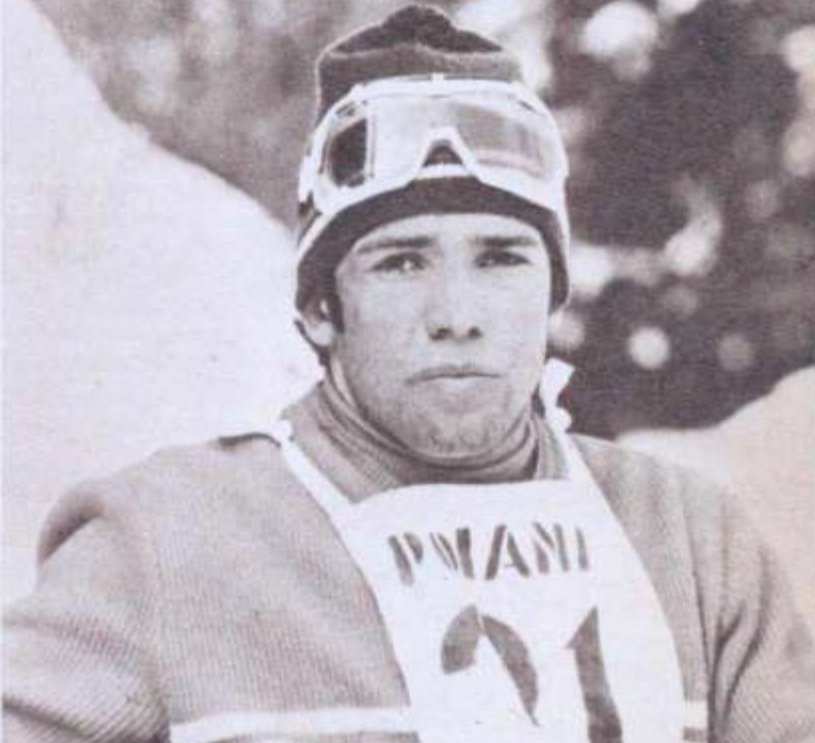
- Cristea in 1972

Personal information
- Nationality: Romanian
- Born: 2 February 1949 (age 76); Bușteni, Romania

Sport
- Sport: Alpine skiing

Dan Cristea (born 2 February 1949) is a Romanian alpine skier. He competed at the 1968, 1972 and the 1976 Winter Olympics.

== Career ==
He began practicing the sport at the age of seven. He participated three times in the Winter Olympics, Grenoble 1968, Sapporo 1972 and Innsbruck 1976. He started in the downhill, giant slalom and slalom events. His best result at the Olympic Games was 25th place in the slalom in Grenoble 1968. At the 1974 World Championships in St. Moritz he placed 15th in slalom and 9th in the Alpine combined. After his retirement, Dan Cristea became a coach.
