= Robert Blanchaer =

Belgian alpine skier (born 1952)

Personal information
- Born: 22 September 1952 (age 72); Wilrijk, Antwerp, Belgium

Sport
- Sport: Alpine skiing

Robert Blanchaer (born 22 September 1952) is a Belgian former alpine skier. He competed in the men's downhill, men's giant slalom and men's slalom events in the 1972 and 1976 Winter Olympics. In addition, he was also the flag bearer for Belgium in the 1972 and 1976 Winter Olympics opening ceremony.

Blancher is currently the coach of Antwerp Ski Team.
