= Josef Loidl =

Austrian alpine skier (born 1946)

Josef Loidl (born 3 June 1946 in Ebensee) is an Austrian former alpine skier who competed in the 1972 Winter Olympics.
