= Reto Barrington =

Canadian alpine skier (born 1952)

Reto Barrington (born 25 December 1952) is a Canadian former alpine skier who competed in the 1972 Winter Olympics.
