= Walter Tresch =

Swiss alpine skier (1948–2026)

Personal information
- Born: 4 April 1948 Bristen, Uri, Switzerland
- Died: 29 August 2026 (aged 78)

Skiing career
- Sport: Alpine skiing
- Disciplines: Technical events

Olympics
- Teams: 2

World Cup
- Wins: 4
- Podiums: 14
Medal record
Men's alpine skiing
Representing Switzerland
World Cup race podiums
Event	1st	2nd	3rd
Slalom	0	1	2
Giant slalom	0	0	1
Downhill	1	0	2
Combined	3	1	2
Parallel	0	0	1
Total	4	2	8
World Championships
Silver medal – second place	1972 Sapporo	Combined

Walter Tresch (4 April 1948 – 29 August 2026) was a Swiss alpine skier. He competed at the 1972 and 1976 Winter Olympics. Tresch was the owner of a sole proprietorship for trading in wine and sporting goods. A sports promotion foundation in Silenen is named after him.

Tresch died on 29 August 2026, at the age of 78.
