= Jim Hunter (skier) =

Canadian alpine skier

Personal information
- Full name: James Mark Hunter
- Born: May 30, 1953 (age 73) Shaunavon, Saskatchewan, Canada

Skiing career
- Sport: Alpine skiing
- Club: Skimeisters of Calgary
- Retired: March 1977
- Disciplines: Downhill, slalom, giant slalom
- World Cup debut: 1971

Olympics
- Teams: 2

World Championships
- Medals: 1

World Cup
- Seasons: 6
- Podiums: 2
Medal record
Men's alpine skiing
Representing Canada
World Championships
| Bronze medal – third place | 1972 Sapporo | Combined |

James Mark Hunter (born May 30, 1953), nicknamed "Jungle Jim", is a Canadian former alpine ski racer who represented Canada at two Winter Olympic Games in 1972 and 1976, and won a bronze medal in the 1972 World Championships. He was a member of the Canadian Men's Alpine Ski Team nicknamed the "Crazy Canucks", and is considered to be the original Crazy Canuck.

== Biography ==
Hunter was born in Shaunavon, Saskatchewan, Canada, the son of a dairy farmer, and started skiing at the age of eleven having previously played ice hockey. Hunter had a reputation as an off-beat individual; he practiced his racing tuck position atop a rack he built and placed in a pick-up truck as his father drove at over 100 km/h (62 mph), and tested his balance by placing himself in the wheel of a moving tractor and jumping out.

Hunter joined the Canadian Men's Alpine Ski Team in 1970, and earned himself the nickname "Jungle Jim" with his aggressive style on the slopes.

Hunter represented Canada at two Winter Olympics. At the 1972 Winter Olympics in Sapporo, Japan, he placed twentieth in the downhill, eleventh in the giant slalom, and nineteenth in the slalom. Although he didn't win an Olympic medal, the Olympic competition was also that year's World Championship, and the combined results were good enough to earn him a bronze medal in the alpine combined event. This was the first World Championship medal in alpine skiing won by a Canadian male skier. At the 1976 Winter Olympics in Innsbruck, Austria, he placed tenth in the downhill, twenty-second in the giant slalom, and twenty-third in the slalom.

Hunter placed in the top ten at seventeen World Cup events but never won a gold medal. He did reach the World Cup podium twice, a third-place finish in the downhill at Wengen, Switzerland in 1976 and a second-place finish in the combined at Kitzbuhel.

Hunter retired from the Canadian ski team in March, 1977. He then competed as a professional on the World Pro Ski Tour winning the first ever downhill event held on the tour.

In the run up to the Games of the XV Winter Olympiade, Hunter managed the 88-day Olympic Torch Relay from St. John's, Newfoundland, across Canada to the games site at Calgary, Alberta.

Hunter hosted "The Jungle Jim Hunter Show" on The Fan 960 radio station. He is also a motivational speaker and provides developmental coaching for athletes and teams from Calgary where he resides with his wife and four grown children.

Jim Hunter is an uncle to each of the Hunter Brothers, a Canadian country music group from Shaunavon, Saskatchewan.

== See also ==
- Crazy Canucks
