= Malcolm Milne =

Australian alpine skier

Personal information
- Born: 9 November 1948 (age 77) Beechworth, Victoria, Australia
- Height: 1.83 m (6 ft 0 in)

Skiing career
- Sport: Alpine skiing
- Club: Falls Creek
- Disciplines: Downhill, giant slalom, slalom
- World Cup debut: 1968 (age 19)

Olympics
- Teams: 2 – (1968, 1972)
- Medals: 0

World Championships
- Teams: 3 – (1968, 1970, 1972) includes Olympics
- Medals: 1 (0 gold)

World Cup
- Seasons: 5 – (1968–72)
- Wins: 1 – (1 DH)
- Podiums: 2 – (2 DH)
- Overall titles: 0 – (14th in 1970)
- Discipline titles: 0 – (4th in DH, 1970)
Medal record
Men's alpine skiing
Representing Australia
World Championships
Bronze medal – third place	1970 Val Gardena	Downhill

Malcolm Milne (born 9 November 1948) is a former World Cup alpine ski racer from Australia. Some sources give his birth date as 5 November 1948.

Born Beechworth, Victoria, and raised on the family tobacco farm in Myrtleford, Milne competed in his first Olympics in 1968 at Grenoble, France. In an era dominated by Jean-Claude Killy, he finished 24th of 86 starters, with a time only 5.51 seconds behind Killy. This was by far the best Australian skiing result in any Games to that point.

In December 1969 at Val-d'Isère, Milne became the first Australian skier to win a World Cup event. It was also the first podium by an alpine racer from the Southern Hemisphere. It also made Milne the first non-European to win a men's World Cup downhill, a feat that is often attributed by Canadians to Ken Read, who won his first on the same course six years later in December 1975. Two months later, Milne captured the bronze medal in the downhill at the World Championships at Val Gardena, Italy, which also counted as a World Cup podium.

Milne trained with the French ski team in Europe, and won a United States title race at Bear Valley, California. He was expected to do well at the Olympics at Sapporo, Japan, in 1972; he suffered a cartilage injury to his left knee that threatened to cause a withdrawal. He did not withdraw, and recovered from a near fall that cost him any chance of a podium finish. He called the race "my worst ever", and team manager Dick Watson said that

Malcolm was very keyed up ... He made one mistake and in trying to correct his line nearly fell. In a remarkable recovery, he dragged his arm in the snow for at least 50 yards to recover his balance and in doing so lost over two seconds, which, of course, cost him the chance he had of a place.

After Sapporo, he turned professional for two years, joining a troupe formed by Jean-Claude Killy, specialising in head-to-head parallel-course racing. He retired, and later noted

Someone once said to me that for us to beat the Europeans at winter sports was like Austria tackling us at Test cricket. I reckon it's an accurate judgement.

Prior to the Sydney Olympics of 2000, Milne was honored by carrying the Olympic torch through the town of Myrtleford where he lives with his wife Sherry and family. In 2000, he received the Australian Sports Medal for his contribution to skiing. He was inducted into the Sport Australia Hall of Fame in 1985.

In 2004 Ski & Snowboard Australia elected Milne a life member for the contribution he has made to the sport by becoming the first World Cup medal winner in Australian winter sports history, and the subsequent impact his performances have had on future athletes.

His brother Ross Milne died during training for the 1964 Winter Olympics. The IOC said that he "caught an edge" and suggested that inexperience played a role. Australian manager John Wagner called Ross a competent ski racer and blamed overcrowding on the slope. Malcolm said that attempts by the IOC to blame Ross motivated him to excel in his sport:

What motivated me most was this suggestion from Europe that skiers from minor [winter sport] countries like Australia and New Zealand should maybe not be allowed to race on difficult courses ... that such accidents might not happen if skiers with less experience were barred from competition. I was only young at the time, but I knew very well that it was a cover-up kind of story. It made me want to prove that we were capable of racing downhill.

== World Cup results ==
=== Top ten finishes ===
- 1 win – (1 DH)
- 2 podiums – (2 DH)
- 7 top tens (7 DH)

Season	Date	Location	Discipline	Place
1970	14 Dec 1969	Val-d'Isère, France	Downhill	1st
1970	15 Feb 1970	Val Gardena, Italy	Downhill	3rd
1970	21 Feb 1970	(United States) Jackson Hole, USA	Downhill	5th
1971	29 Jan 1971	Megève, France	Downhill	8th
1971	31 Jan 1971	Megève, France	Downhill	6th
1972	14 Jan 1972	Kitzbühel, Austria	Downhill	8th
1972	15 Jan 1972	Kitzbühel, Austria	Downhill	6th

=== Season standings ===
Season	Age	Overall	Slalom	Giant Slalom	Super G	Downhill	Combined
1968	19	—	—	—	not run	—	not run
1969	20	—	—	—	not run		not run
1970	21	14	—	38	not run	4	not run
1971	22	39	—	—	not run	15	not run
1972	23	37	—	—	not run	14	not run

Points were only awarded for top ten finishes (see scoring system).
