= Alpine skiing at the 1972 Winter Olympics =

Alpine skiing at the XI Olympic Winter Games
- Venue: Mount Eniwa (downhill) and Teine; Hokkaidō, Japan
- Dates: February 5–13, 1972
- No. of events: 6
- Competitors: 144 from 27 nations

Location in Japan
Locations on Hokkaido

Alpine skiing at the 1972 Winter Olympics consisted of six events, held February 5–13 near Sapporo, Japan. The downhills were held at Mount Eniwa, and the four technical events at Teine.

== Medal summary ==
Six nations won medals in alpine skiing; Switzerland led in medals with three gold, two silver, and a bronze. Switzerland's Marie-Theres Nadig led the individual medal table, with two gold medals. The top men's medalist was Gustav Thöni of Italy with a gold and a silver.

The gold medal won in the slalom by Francisco Fernández Ochoa was Spain's first medal at the Winter Olympics. Ochoa's win would remain as Spain's sole gold medal until the 2026 Winter Games.

=== Medal table ===
Rank	Nation	Gold	Silver	Bronze	Total
1	Switzerland	3	2	1	6
2	Italy	1	1	1	3
3	United States	1	0	1	2
4	Spain	1	0	0	1
5	Austria	0	2	2	4
6	France	0	1	1	2
Totals (6 entries)		6	6	6	18

=== Men's events ===
Event	Gold		Silver		Bronze	
Downhill	Bernhard Russi; Switzerland	1:51.43	Roland Collombin; Switzerland	1:52.07	Heinrich Messner; Austria	1:52.40
Giant slalom	Gustav Thöni; Italy	3:09.62	Edmund Bruggmann; Switzerland	3:10.75	Werner Mattle; Switzerland	3:10.99
Slalom	Francisco Fernández Ochoa; Spain	1:49.27	Gustav Thöni; Italy	1:50.28	Roland Thöni; Italy	1:50.30

=== Women's events ===
Event	Gold		Silver		Bronze	
Downhill	Marie-Theres Nadig; Switzerland	1:36.68	Annemarie Moser-Pröll; Austria	1:37.00	Susan Corrock; United States	1:37.68
Giant slalom	Marie-Theres Nadig; Switzerland	1:29.90	Annemarie Moser-Pröll; Austria	1:30.75	Wiltrud Drexel; Austria	1:32.35
Slalom	Barbara Cochran; United States	1:31.24	Danièle Debernard; France	1:31.26	Florence Steurer; France	1:32.69

== Course information ==
Date	Race	Start Elevation	Finish Elevation	Vertical Drop	Course Length	Average Gradient
Mon 7-Feb	Downhill – men	1,126 m (3,694 ft)	354 m (1,161 ft)	772 m (2,533 ft)	2.636 km (1.638 mi)	29.3%
Sat 5-Feb	Downhill – women	870 m (2,854 ft)	336 m (1,102 ft)	534 m (1,752 ft)	2.108 km (1.310 mi)	25.3%
Wed 9-Feb	Giant slalom – men (1st run)	952 m (3,123 ft)	550 m (1,804 ft)	402 m (1,319 ft)	1.075 km (0.668 mi)	37.4%
Thu 10-Feb	Giant slalom – men (2nd run)	952 m (3,123 ft)	550 m (1,804 ft)	402 m (1,319 ft)	1.089 km (0.677 mi)	36.9%
Tue 8-Feb	Giant slalom – women	982 m (3,222 ft)	625 m (2,051 ft)	357 m (1,171 ft)	1.232 km (0.766 mi)	29.0%
Sun 13-Feb	Slalom – men (2 runs)	795 m (2,608 ft)	567 m (1,860 ft)	228 m (748 ft)	0.531 km (0.330 mi)	42.9%
Fri 11-Feb	Slalom – women (2 runs)	751 m (2,464 ft)	567 m (1,860 ft)	184 m (604 ft)	0.449 km (0.279 mi)	34.3%

== Participating nations ==
Twenty-seven nations sent alpine skiers to compete in the events in Sapporo. The Philippines and Chinese Taipei made their Olympic alpine skiing debuts. Below is a list of the competing nations; in parentheses are the number of national competitors.

- Argentina (2)
- Australia (2)
- Austria (13)
- Belgium (1)
- Bulgaria (2)
- Canada (8)
- France (12)
- West Germany (11)
- Great Britain (8)
- Greece (3)
- Iran (4)
- Italy (8)
- Japan (10)
- Lebanon (1)
- Liechtenstein (3)
- New Zealand (2)
- Norway (7)
- Philippines (2)
- Poland (2)
- Republic of China (4)
- Romania (2)
- Soviet Union (4)
- Spain (3)
- Sweden (4)
- Switzerland (12)
- United States (13)
- Yugoslavia (1)

== World championships ==
From 1948 through 1980, the alpine skiing events at the Winter Olympics also served as the World Championships, held every two years. With the addition of the giant slalom, the combined event was dropped for 1950 and 1952, but returned as a World Championship event in 1954 as a "paper race" which used the results from the three events. During the Olympics from 1956 through 1980, World Championship medals were awarded by the FIS for the combined event. The combined returned as a separate event at the World Championships in 1982 and at the Olympics in 1988.

=== Combined ===
==== Men's Combined ====
Medal	Athlete	Points	DH	GS	SL
1st place, gold medalist(s)	(Italy) Gustav Thöni (ITA)	21.12	13	1st place, gold medalist(s)	2nd place, silver medalist(s)
2nd place, silver medalist(s)	(Switzerland) Walter Tresch (SUI)	46.98	6	14	13
3rd place, bronze medalist(s)	(Canada) Jim Hunter (CAN)	86.41	20	11	19
4	(Canada) Reto Barrington (CAN)	122.66	32	20	23
5	(Australia) Malcolm Milne (AUS)	134.70	23	29	24
6	(Romania) Virgil Brenci (ROM)	177.58	48	33	20

- Downhill was run on 7 February, Giant slalom on 9–10 February,
  Slalom on 13 February

==== Women's Combined ====
Medal	Athlete	Points	DH	GS	SL
1st place, gold medalist(s)	(Austria) Annemarie Moser-Pröll (AUT)	25.64	2nd place, silver medalist(s)	2nd place, silver medalist(s)	5
2nd place, silver medalist(s)	(France) Florence Steurer (FRA)	59.51	23	6	3rd place, bronze medalist(s)
3rd place, bronze medalist(s)	(Norway) Toril Førland (NOR)	80.95	11	17	9
4	(Austria) Monika Kaserer (AUT)	82.71	30	13	7
5	(Canada) Laurie Kreiner (CAN)	83.10	20	4	12
6	(United Kingdom) Gina Hathorn (GBR)	86.39	25	14	11

- Downhill was run on 5 February, Giant slalom on 8 February, Slalom on 11 February
- Marie-Theres Nadig of Switzerland won the downhill and giant slalom, but DNF in first run of slalom.
