= 1972 Winter Olympics =

Multi-sport event in Sapporo, Japan

XI Olympic Winter Games
- Emblem of the 1972 Winter Olympics
- Location: Sapporo, Japan
- Nations: 35
- Athletes: 1,010 (805 men, 205 women)
- Events: 35 in 6 sports (10 disciplines)
- Opening: February 3, 1972
- Closing: February 13, 1972
- Opened by: Emperor Showa
- Closed by: IOC President Avery Brundage
- Cauldron: Hideki Takada
- Stadium: Makomanai Open Stadium

The 1972 Winter Olympics, officially the XI Olympic Winter Games (Note: Japanese: 第11回オリンピック冬季競技大会, Hepburn: Dai Jūichi-kai Orinpikku Tōkikyōgi Taikai) and commonly known as Sapporo 1972, (Note: Japanese: 札幌1972) were a winter multi-sport event held from February 3 to 13, 1972, in Sapporo, Hokkaido Prefecture, Japan. It was the first Winter Olympic Games to take place outside Europe and North America.

== Host city selection ==
Sapporo first won the rights to host the 1940 Winter Olympics, but Japan resigned as the Games' host after its 1937 invasion of China. The 1940 Games were later cancelled. All the cities awarded Games that were cancelled due to war have since hosted the Games (London, Tokyo, Helsinki, Sapporo and Cortina d'Ampezzo).

Sapporo competed with Banff, Lahti, and Salt Lake City. The Games were awarded at the 64th IOC Session in Rome, Italy, on April 26, 1966.

In preparation, the Japanese constructed new largescale facilities at Sapporo and conducted a trial run a full year in advance of the Games. An international sport week was held in February, 1971, to assess the city's preparations as well as "to test its civic mettle and hospitality", and this effort was acclaimed by Olympic observers as "a complete success". The development of new infrastructure proved to be a huge boon for the Sapporo economy: by the time of the Games, the national government had invested some US$500 million in upgrades, including a new subway. The Games' organizers themselves turned a healthy profit in part because they arranged a record $8.47 million for broadcasting rights with American companies. The graphic designer Kenichi Kuriyagawa designed posters for Sapporo's bid and served on the Games' design committee from 1967 to 1972.

1972 Winter Olympics bidding result
City	Country	Round 1
Sapporo	Japan	32
Banff & Calgary	Canada	16
Lahti	Finland	7
Salt Lake City	United States	7

== Highlights ==
Official poster for the 1972 Winter Olympics

- Emperor Hirohito became the third dignitary to open the Olympic Games twice (first time in summer 1964), after Adolf Hitler had done in winter and summer 1936, and Giovanni Gronchi in winter 1956 and summer 1960.
- Prior to these games, Japan had never won a gold medal, and had won only one medal (silver by Chiharu Igaya in 1956) overall, in the Winter Olympics. The host country's fans in Sapporo were boosted when three Japanese athletes, led by Yukio Kasaya, swept the ski jumping 70 m (current K-90 normal hill) event for gold (Kasaya), silver (Akitsugu Konno), and bronze (Seiji Aochi); those would also be the only medals Japan would earn in these Olympics.
- Galina Kulakova of the USSR won all three cross-country skiing events for women.
- Dutch skater Ard Schenk won three gold medals in speed skating.
- In Women's Alpine skiing, American Barbara Cochran, one of three siblings on the U.S. Ski Team, became the first U.S. woman since Andrea Mead Lawrence to win a gold medal in skiing when she took first place in the slalom.
- In Alpine skiing, virtual unknown Swiss Marie-Thérès Nadig won both the downhill and the giant slalom events.
- Magnar Solberg from Norway was the first repeat winner in the individual 20 km biathlon event, having first won in Grenoble.
- Spain scored its first Winter gold medal courtesy of slalom skier Francisco Fernández Ochoa. Poland did the same with Wojciech Fortuna winning the large hill ski jumping competition.
- American female speedskaters Anne Henning (16-year-old) and Dianne Holum made the United States' best showing in the Winter Games, winning two gold, a silver, and a bronze.
- Three days before the Games, controversy over amateur status arose when IOC president Avery Brundage threatened to disqualify 40 alpine skiers who received endorsement and other deals. Austrian skier Karl Schranz, who received over $50,000 per year from ski manufacturers, was banned as an example. Meanwhile, Canada refused to send an ice hockey team, maintaining that professional ice hockey players from Communist nations were allowed to compete with no restrictions.
- On an historical note, these Games were the last where a skier won a gold medal using all-wooden skis. Since this time, top-level cross-country skiers have used skis made mostly of fibreglass synthetics.
- In female Figure skating event, American skater Janet Lynn won not only a bronze medal, but also tremendous popularity among Japanese audiences because of her artistic free program, as to make appearance on the cover of "Olympic Winter Games, Sapporo 1972" photo books published in Japan, and even on Japanese TV commercials later.
- Luge had its only tie in the history of the Winter Olympics in the men's doubles event.

== Venues ==
- City venues
  - Makomanai Park
    - Makomanai Speed Skating Rink^{1} – opening ceremonies, speed skating
    - Makomanai Ice Arena^{1} – ice hockey finals, figure skating final rounds, closing ceremonies
    - Olympic village^{1}
    - Press center^{1}
    - Makomanai Cross-Country Events Site^{1} – cross-country skiing, Nordic combined (cross-country skiing)
    - Makomanai Biathlon Site^{1} – biathlon
  - Mikaho Indoor Skating Rink^{1} – figure skating
  - Tsukisamu Indoor Skating Rink^{1} – ice hockey
- Mountain venues
  - Mt. Teine Alpine Skiing courses^{1} – alpine skiing (slalom, giant slalom)
  - Mt. Teine Bobsleigh Course – bobsleigh
  - Mt. Teine Luge Course – luge
  - Okurayama Jump Hill^{2} – ski jumping (large hill)
  - Miyanomori Jump Hill^{1} – Nordic combined (ski jumping), ski jumping (normal hill)
  - Mount Eniwa Downhill Course^{1} – alpine skiing (downhill)

^{1} New facilities constructed in preparation for the Olympic Games. ^{2} Existing facilities modified or refurbished in preparation for the Olympic Games.

== Sports ==
There were 35 events contested in 6 sports (10 disciplines).

- Alpine skiing (6)
- Biathlon (2)
- Bobsleigh (2)
- Cross-country skiing (7)
- Figure skating (3)
- Ice hockey (1)
- Luge (3)
- Nordic combined (1)
- Ski jumping (2)
- Speed skating (8)

== Participating nations ==
35 nations participated in the 1972 Winter Olympics. The Republic of China (commonly known as Taiwan) and the Philippines participated in their first Winter Olympic Games.

Participating National Olympic Committees
- Argentina (2)
- Australia (4)
- Austria (40)
- Belgium (1)
- Bulgaria (4)
- Canada (47)
- Czechoslovakia (41)
- East Germany (42)
- Finland (50)
- France (40)
- Great Britain (37)
- Greece (3)
- Hungary (1)
- Iran (4)
- Italy (44)
- Japan (85) (host)
- Lebanon (1)
- Liechtenstein (4)
- Mongolia (4)
- Netherlands (11)
- New Zealand (2)
- North Korea (6)
- Norway (67)
- Philippines (2)
- Poland (47)
- Republic of China (5)
- Romania (13)
- South Korea (5)
- Soviet Union (78)
- Spain (3)
- Sweden (58)
- Switzerland (52)
- United States (103)
- West Germany (78)
- Yugoslavia (26)

=== Number of athletes by National Olympic Committees ===
IOC Letter Code	Country	Athletes
USA	United States	103
JPN	Japan	85
GER	West Germany	78
URS	Soviet Union	78
NOR	Norway	67
SWE	Sweden	58
SUI	Switzerland	52
FIN	Finland	50
CAN	Canada	47
POL	Poland	47
ITA	Italy	44
GDR	East Germany	42
TCH	Czechoslovakia	41
AUT	Austria	40
FRA	France	40
GBR	Great Britain	37
YUG	Yugoslavia	26
ROM	Romania	13
HOL	Netherlands	11
PRK	North Korea	6
KOR	South Korea	5
ROC	Republic of China	5
AUS	Australia	4
BUL	Bulgaria	4
IRI	Iran	4
LIE	Liechtenstein	4
MGL	Mongolia	4
GRE	Greece	3
ESP	Spain	3
ARG	Argentina	2
NZL	New Zealand	2
PHI	Philippines	2
BEL	Belgium	1
HUN	Hungary	1
LIB	Lebanon	1
Total		1,006

== Medal count ==
These are the top eleven nations that won medals at these Games. The host nation Japan finished 11th.

Rank	Nation	Gold	Silver	Bronze	Total
1	Soviet Union	8	5	3	16
2	East Germany	4	3	7	14
3	Switzerland	4	3	3	10
4	Netherlands	4	3	2	9
5	United States	3	2	3	8
6	West Germany	3	1	1	5
7	Norway	2	5	5	12
8	Italy	2	2	1	5
9	Austria	1	2	2	5
10	Sweden	1	1	2	4
11	Japan*	1	1	1	3
Totals (11 entries)		33	28	30	91

=== Podium sweeps ===
Date	Sport	Event	NOC	Gold	Silver	Bronze
6 February	Ski jumping	Normal hill individual	Japan	Yukio Kasaya	Akitsugu Konno	Seiji Aochi
7 February	Luge	Women's singles	East Germany	Anna-Maria Müller	Ute Rührold	Margit Schumann
7 February	Luge	Men's singles	East Germany	Wolfgang Scheidel	Harald Ehrig	Wolfram Fiedler

== See also ==
- 1972 Summer Paralympics
- 1972 Summer Olympics
- Olympic Games held in Japan
  - 1964 Summer Olympics – Tokyo
  - 1972 Winter Olympics – Sapporo
  - 1998 Winter Olympics – Nagano
  - 2020 Summer Olympics – Tokyo
- List of IOC country codes

== Notes ==
Winter Olympics
Preceded by Grenoble	XI Olympic Winter Games; Sapporo; 1972	Succeeded by Innsbruck
