= 1973–74 FIS Alpine Ski World Cup =

International sports competition

FIS Alpine Ski World Cup 1973/74
| Discipline | Men | Women |
| Overall | (Italy) Piero Gros | (Austria) Annemarie Pröll |
| Downhill | (Switzerland) Roland Collombin | (Austria) Annemarie Pröll |
| Giant slalom | (Italy) Piero Gros | (Liechtenstein) Hanni Wenzel |
| Slalom | (Italy) Gustav Thöni | (West Germany) Christa Zechmeister |
| Nations Cup | Italy | Austria |
- Nations Cup overall: Austria

Competition
| Locations | 15 | 9 |
| Individual | 21 | 17 |

The 8th World Cup season began in December 1973 and concluded in March 1974. Piero Gros of Italy won the overall title, denying the runner-up, countryman Gustav Thöni, a fourth straight overall title. Annemarie Pröll of Austria won the women's overall title, her fourth of five consecutive.

The break in the schedule was for the 1974 World Championships, held February 3–10 at St. Moritz, Switzerland.

Due to the growth of the professional skiing tour (especially in the United States), which now featured World Cup winning stars such as Jean-Claude Killy, Karl Schranz, Patrick Russel, and Jean-Noël Augert, no World Cup races were held in North America for the first time in its history; the next time this happened was during the COVID-19 pandemic in the 2020-21 season. Instead, the entire 1973–74 season took place in Europe.

== Calendar ==
=== Men ===
Event key: DH – Downhill, SL – Slalom, GS – Giant slalom
| Race | Season | Date | Place | Type | Winner | Second | Third |
|---|---|---|---|---|---|---|---|
| 157 | 1 | 8 December 1973 | (France) Val d'Isère | GS _{054} | (Austria) Hansi Hinterseer | (Italy) Helmuth Schmalzl | (Italy) Piero Gros |
| 158 | 2 | 10 December 1973 | (France) Val d'Isère | DH _{045} | (Italy) Herbert Plank | (Austria) Werner Grissmann | (Austria) Franz Klammer |
| 159 | 3 | 16 December 1973 | (Austria) Saalbach | GS _{055} | (Austria) Hubert Berchtold | (Austria) Thomas Hauser | (Austria) Hansi Hinterseer |
| 160 | 4 | 17 December 1973 | (Italy) Vipiteno | SL _{060} | (Italy) Piero Gros | (Austria) Johann Kniewasser | (West Germany) Christian Neureuther |
| 161 | 5 | 18 December 1973 | (Austria) Zell am See | DH _{046} | (Austria) Karl Cordin | (Switzerland) Roland Collombin | (Austria) Peter Feyersinger (Australia) Manfred Grabler (Austria) Josef Walcher |
| 162 | 6 | 22 December 1973 | (Austria) Schladming | DH _{047} | (Austria) Franz Klammer | (Switzerland) Roland Collombin | (Switzerland) Bernhard Russi |
| 163 | 7 | 5 January 1974 | (West Germany) Garmisch | SL _{061} | (West Germany) Christian Neureuther | (Italy) Gustav Thöni | (West Germany) Hansjorg Schlager |
| 164 | 8 | 6 January 1974 | (West Germany) Garmisch | DH _{048} | (Switzerland) Roland Collombin | (Austria) Franz Klammer | (Italy) Herbert Plank |
| 165 | 9 | 7 January 1974 | (West Germany) Berchtesgaden | GS _{056} | (Italy) Piero Gros | (Italy) Gustav Thöni | (Italy) Erwin Stricker |
| 166 | 10 | 12 January 1974 | (France) Avoriaz | DH _{049} | (Switzerland) Roland Collombin | (Austria) Franz Klammer | (Switzerland) Philippe Roux |
| 167 | 11 | 13 January 1974 | (France) Morzine | GS _{057} | (Italy) Piero Gros | (Austria) Hansi Hinterseer | (Italy) Gustav Thöni |
| 168 | 12 | 19 January 1974 | (Switzerland) Wengen | DH _{050} | (Switzerland) Roland Collombin | (Austria) Franz Klammer | (Italy) Herbert Plank |
| 169 | 13 | 20 January 1974 | (Switzerland) Wengen | SL _{062} | (West Germany) Christian Neureuther | (Italy) Fausto Radici | (Austria) David Zwilling |
| 170 | 14 | 21 January 1974 | (Switzerland) Adelboden | GS _{058} | (Italy) Gustav Thöni | (Italy) Piero Gros | (Austria) Hansi Hinterseer |
| 171 | 15 | 26 January 1974 | (Austria) Kitzbühel | DH _{051} | (Switzerland) Roland Collombin | (Italy) Stefano Anzi (Italy) Giuliano Besson | |
| 172 | 16 | 27 January 1974 | (Austria) Kitzbühel | SL _{063} | (Austria) Hansi Hinterseer | (Austria) Johann Kniewasser | (Italy) Gustav Thöni |
FIS Alpine World Ski Championships 1974 (3–10 February)
| 173 | 17 | 2 March 1974 | (Norway) Voss | GS _{059} | (Italy) Gustav Thöni | (Austria) Hansi Hinterseer | (Sweden) Ingemar Stenmark |
| 174 | 18 | 3 March 1974 | (Norway) Voss | SL _{064} | (Italy) Piero Gros | (Sweden) Ingemar Stenmark | (Austria) Johann Kniewasser |
| 175 | 19 | 6 March 1974 | (Poland) Zakopane | SL _{065} | (Spain) Francisco Fernandez-Ochoa | (Italy) Gustav Thöni | (Austria) Hansi Hinterseer |
| 176 | 20 | 9 March 1974 | (Czechoslovakia) Vysoké Tatry | GS _{060} | (Italy) Piero Gros | (Sweden) Ingemar Stenmark | (Austria) Hansi Hinterseer |
| 177 | 21 | 10 March 1974 | (Czechoslovakia) Vysoké Tatry | SL _{066} | (Italy) Gustav Thöni | (Sweden) Ingemar Stenmark | (Spain) Francisco Fernández Ochoa |

=== Ladies ===
Event key: DH – Downhill, SL – Slalom, GS – Giant slalom
| Race | Season | Date | Place | Type | Winner | Second | Third |
|---|---|---|---|---|---|---|---|
| 155 | 1 | 6 December 1973 | (France) Val d'Isère | DH _{041} | (Austria) Annemarie Pröll | (Austria) Ingrid Gfolner | (Austria) Wiltrud Drexel |
| 156 | 2 | 7 December 1973 | (France) Val d'Isère | SL _{063} | (West Germany) Christa Zechmeister | (Liechtenstein) Hanni Wenzel | (United States) Marilyn Cochran |
| 157 | 3 | 19 December 1973 | (Austria) Zell am See | DH _{042} | (Austria) Annemarie Pröll | (Austria) Wiltrud Drexel | (Switzerland) Marie-Theres Nadig |
| 158 | 4 | 20 December 1973 | (Austria) Zell am See | GS _{053} | (Liechtenstein) Hanni Wenzel | (Switzerland) Marie-Theres Nadig | (Austria) Traudl Treichl |
| 159 | 5 | 5 January 1974 | (West Germany) Pfronten | DH _{043} | (Austria) Annemarie Pröll | (Austria) Wiltrud Drexel | (Canada) Betsy Clifford |
| 160 | 6 | 6 January 1974 | (West Germany) Pfronten | GS _{054} | (Canada) Kathy Kreiner | (Switzerland) Lise-Marie Morerod | (France) Fabienne Serrat |
| 161 | 7 | 8 January 1974 | (France) Les Gets | SL _{064} | (West Germany) Christa Zechmeister | (United States) Lindy Cochran | (Austria) Annemarie Pröll |
| 162 | 8 | 9 January 1974 | (France) Les Gets | GS _{055} | (Italy) Claudia Giordani | (United States) Barbara Ann Cochran | (Liechtenstein) Hanni Wenzel |
| 163 | 9 | 13 January 1974 | (Switzerland) Grindelwald | DH _{044} | (United States) Cindy Nelson | (Austria) Annemarie Pröll | (Switzerland) Marie-Theres Nadig |
| 164 | 10 | 14 January 1974 | (Switzerland) Grindelwald | GS _{056} | (Austria) Monika Kaserer | (Liechtenstein) Hanni Wenzel | (West Germany) Christa Zechmeister |
| 165 | 11 | 16 January 1974 | (Switzerland) Les Diablerets | SL _{065} | (West Germany) Christa Zechmeister | (France) Fabienne Serrat | (West Germany) Rosi Mittermaier |
| 166 | 12 | 23 January 1974 | (Austria) Badgastein | DH _{045} | (Austria) Annemarie Pröll | (Switzerland) Marie-Theres Nadig | (Austria) Wiltrud Drexel |
| 167 | 13 | 24 January 1974 | (Austria) Badgastein | SL _{066} | (West Germany) Christa Zechmeister | (France) Fabienne Serrat | (Austria) Monika Kaserer |
| 168 | 14 | 25 January 1974 | (Austria) Badgastein | GS _{057} | (France) Fabienne Serrat | (Switzerland) Lise-Marie Morerod | (West Germany) Rosi Mittermaier |
FIS Alpine World Ski Championships 1974 (3–10 February)
| 169 | 15 | 27 February 1974 | (Italy) Abetone | SL _{067} | (West Germany) Rosi Mittermaier | (Austria) Annemarie Pröll | (France) Fabienne Serrat |
| 170 | 16 | 7 March 1974 | (Czechoslovakia) Vysoké Tatry | GS _{058} | (Austria) Monika Kaserer | (Austria) Annemarie Pröll | (Switzerland) Lise-Marie Morerod |
| 171 | 17 | 8 March 1974 | (Czechoslovakia) Vysoké Tatry | SL _{068} | (West Germany) Rosi Mittermaier | (France) Danièle Debernard | (Liechtenstein) Hanni Wenzel |

== Men ==
=== Overall ===
The Men's overall World Cup 1973/74 was divided into three periods. From the first 6 races the best 4 results count, from the next 10 races (Race No 7 to No 16) the best 6 results count and from the last 5 races the best 3 results count. Four racers had a point deduction.

| Place | Name | Country | Total |
|---|---|---|---|
| 1 | Piero Gros | Italy | 181 |
| 2 | Gustav Thöni | Italy | 165 |
| 3 | Hansi Hinterseer | Austria | 162 |
| 4 | Roland Collombin | Switzerland | 140 |
| 5 | Franz Klammer | Austria | 125 |
| 6 | Erwin Stricker | Italy | 73 |
| 7 | Johann Kniewasser | Austria | 67 |
| 8 | Herbert Plank | Italy | 66 |
| | Christian Neureuther | West Germany | 66 |
| 10 | Helmuth Schmalzl | Italy | 65 |
| 11 | David Zwilling | Austria | 62 |
| | Ingemar Stenmark | Sweden | 62 |
| 13 | Fausto Radici | Italy | 49 |
| 14 | Francisco Fernández Ochoa | Spain | 46 |
| 15 | Reinhard Tritscher | Austria | 42 |
| | Werner Grissmann | Austria | 42 |

=== Downhill ===
In men's downhill World Cup 1973/74 the best 5 results count. Three racer had a point deduction, which are given in (). Roland Collombin won four races in a row.

| Place | Name | Country | Total | 2 (France) | 5 (Austria) | 6 (Austria) | 8 (Germany) | 10 (France) | 12 (Switzerland) | 15 (Austria) |
|---|---|---|---|---|---|---|---|---|---|---|
| 1 | Roland Collombin | Switzerland | 120 | - | 20 | (20) | 25 | 25 | 25 | 25 |
| 2 | Franz Klammer | Austria | 100 | 15 | - | 25 | 20 | 20 | 20 | (8) |
| 3 | Herbert Plank | Italy | 66 | 25 | - | - | 15 | - | 15 | 11 |
| 4 | Bernhard Russi | Switzerland | 40 | 2 | - | 15 | 4 | 8 | 11 | - |
| | Werner Grissmann | Austria | 40 | 20 | 6 | 2 | 8 | - | 4 | (2) |
| 6 | Karl Cordin | Austria | 37 | 8 | 25 | - | - | 4 | - | - |
| 7 | Reinhard Tritscher | Austria | 36 | 11 | - | 6 | 11 | - | 8 | - |
| 8 | Giuliano Besson | Italy | 30 | 1 | - | - | 6 | - | 3 | 20 |
| 9 | David Zwilling | Austria | 26 | 4 | 2 | 8 | - | 6 | 6 | - |
| 10 | Stefano Anzi | Italy | 25 | - | - | 3 | - | 2 | - | 20 |

=== Giant slalom ===
In men's giant slalom World Cup 1973/74 the best 5 results count. Four racers a had point deduction, which are given in ().

| Place | Name | Country | Total | 1 (France) | 3 (Austria) | 9 (Germany) | 11 (France) | 14 (Switzerland) | 17 (Norway) | 20 (Czechoslovakia) |
|---|---|---|---|---|---|---|---|---|---|---|
| 1 | Piero Gros | Italy | 110 | 15 | (8) | 25 | 25 | 20 | (11) | 25 |
| 2 | Hansi Hinterseer | Austria | 95 | 25 | 15 | - | 20 | 15 | 20 | (15) |
| 3 | Gustav Thöni | Italy | 85 | - | - | 20 | 15 | 25 | 25 | - |
| 4 | Helmuth Schmalzl | Italy | 55 | 20 | (4) | 11 | 8 | 8 | (6) | 8 |
| 5 | Erwin Stricker | Italy | 48 | - | - | 15 | 11 | 11 | - | 11 |
| 6 | Ingemar Stenmark | Sweden | 37 | - | 2 | - | - | - | 15 | 20 |
| 7 | Hubert Berchtold | Austria | 25 | - | 25 | - | - | - | - | - |
| 8 | Engelhard Pargätzi | Switzerland | 21 | (2) | - | 4 | 3 | 6 | 4 | 4 |
| 9 | Thomas Hauser | Austria | 20 | - | 20 | - | - | - | - | - |
| 10 | Franz Klammer | Austria | 17 | - | 11 | 3 | - | - | 3 | - |
| | Erik Håker | Norway | 17 | 3 | - | 6 | - | - | 2 | 6 |

=== Slalom ===
In men's slalom World Cup 1973/74 the best 5 results count. No racer had a point deduction. Gustav Thöni won the cup with only four results.

| Place | Name | Country | Total | 4 (Italy) | 7 (Germany) | 13 (Switzerland) | 16 (Austria) | 18 (Norway) | 19 (Poland) | 21 (Czechoslovakia) |
|---|---|---|---|---|---|---|---|---|---|---|
| 1 | Gustav Thöni | Italy | 80 | - | 20 | - | 15 | - | 20 | 25 |
| 2 | Christian Neureuther | West Germany | 65 | 15 | 25 | 25 | - | - | - | - |
| 3 | Johann Kniewasser | Austria | 63 | 20 | - | - | 20 | 15 | 8 | - |
| 4 | Piero Gros | Italy | 61 | 25 | 2 | - | - | 25 | 1 | 8 |
| 5 | Hansi Hinterseer | Austria | 56 | 6 | 6 | - | 25 | 4 | 15 | - |
| 6 | Ingemar Stenmark | Sweden | 51 | - | - | - | - | 20 | 11 | 20 |
| 7 | Fausto Radici | Italy | 47 | 11 | 8 | 20 | - | 8 | - | - |
| 8 | Francisco Fernández-Ochoa | Spain | 46 | - | - | 6 | - | - | 25 | 15 |
| 9 | David Zwilling | Austria | 26 | - | 11 | 15 | - | - | - | - |
| 10 | Hansjörg Schlager | West Germany | 20 | - | 15 | - | - | - | 2 | 3 |

== Ladies ==
=== Overall ===
The Women's overall World Cup 1973/74 was most likely also divided into periods.

| Place | Name | Country | Total |
|---|---|---|---|
| 1 | Annemarie Pröll | Austria | 268 |
| 2 | Monika Kaserer | Austria | 153 |
| 3 | Hanni Wenzel | Liechtenstein | 144 |
| 4 | Christa Zechmeister | West Germany | 129 |
| 5 | Fabienne Serrat | France | 127 |
| 6 | Marie-Theres Nadig | Switzerland | 123 |
| 7 | Rosi Mittermaier | West Germany | 116 |
| 8 | Lise-Marie Morerod | Switzerland | 77 |
| 9 | Wiltrud Drexel | Austria | 72 |
| 10 | Kathy Kreiner | Canada | 70 |

=== Downhill ===
In women's downhill World Cup 1973/74 all 5 results count. No racer had a point deduction. After her 8 victories of the previous season Annemarie Pröll reached a total of 11 downhill victories in a row, still records for female single discipline serial winner and downhill serial winner (Ingemar Stenmark later won 14 giant slaloms in a row).

| Place | Name | Country | Total | 1 (France) | 3 (Austria) | 5 (Germany) | 9 (Switzerland) | 12 (Austria) |
|---|---|---|---|---|---|---|---|---|
| 1 | Annemarie Pröll | Austria | 120 | 25 | 25 | 25 | 20 | 25 |
| 2 | Marie-Theres Nadig | Switzerland | 72 | 11 | 15 | 11 | 15 | 20 |
| 3 | Wiltrud Drexel | Austria | 70 | 15 | 20 | 20 | - | 15 |
| 4 | Cindy Nelson | United States | 35 | - | - | 6 | 25 | 4 |
| 5 | Ingrid Gfölner | Austria | 34 | 20 | 8 | - | - | 6 |
| 6 | Jacqueline Rouvier | France | 32 | 3 | 6 | 4 | 11 | 8 |
| 7 | Betsy Clifford | Canada | 25 | 6 | 3 | 15 | - | 1 |
| 8 | Irmgard Lukasser | Austria | 20 | 8 | - | 8 | 4 | - |
| 9 | Claudia Giordani | Italy | 14 | - | 11 | 3 | - | - |
| 10 | Monika Kaserer | Austria | 12 | - | - | - | 1 | 11 |

=== Giant slalom ===
In women's giant slalom World Cup 1973/74 the best 5 results count. One racer had a point deduction, which is given in (). Hanni Wenzel won the cup with only four results. In 6 races there were 5 different winners.

| Place | Name | Country | Total | 4 (Austria) | 6 (Germany) | 8 (France) | 10 (Switzerland) | 14 (Austria) | 16 (Czechoslovakia) |
|---|---|---|---|---|---|---|---|---|---|
| 1 | Hanni Wenzel | Liechtenstein | 71 | 25 | - | 15 | 20 | - | 11 |
| 2 | Fabienne Serrat | France | 68 | 11 | 15 | 6 | 11 | 25 | (2) |
| 3 | Monika Kaserer | Austria | 60 | - | - | 2 | 25 | 8 | 25 |
| 4 | Lise-Marie Morerod | Switzerland | 55 | - | 20 | - | - | 20 | 15 |
| 5 | Traudl Treichl | West Germany | 44 | 15 | 11 | 11 | - | 6 | 1 |
| 6 | Claudia Giordani | Italy | 41 | 8 | - | 25 | - | - | 8 |
| 7 | Annemarie Pröll | Austria | 35 | - | 3 | - | 1 | 11 | 20 |
| 8 | Kathy Kreiner | Canada | 31 | 6 | 25 | - | - | - | - |
| 9 | Marie-Theres Nadig | Switzerland | 28 | 20 | - | - | 8 | - | - |
| 10 | Christa Zechmeister | West Germany | 26 | 1 | 6 | - | 15 | 4 | - |

=== Slalom ===
In women's slalom World Cup 1973/74 the best 5 results count. One racer a had point deduction, which is given in (). Christa Zechmeister won four races in a row. All 6 races were won by athletes from West Germany!

| Place | Name | Country | Total | 2 (France) | 7 (France) | 11 (Switzerland) | 13 (Austria) | 15 (Italy) | 17 (Czechoslovakia) |
|---|---|---|---|---|---|---|---|---|---|
| 1 | Christa Zechmeister | West Germany | 103 | 25 | 25 | 25 | 25 | 3 | - |
| 2 | Rosi Mittermaier | West Germany | 87 | 11 | (1) | 15 | 11 | 25 | 25 |
| 3 | Fabienne Serrat | France | 63 | - | 8 | 20 | 20 | 15 | - |
| 4 | Hanni Wenzel | Liechtenstein | 49 | 20 | 2 | 6 | - | 6 | 15 |
| 5 | Annemarie Pröll | Austria | 41 | - | 15 | - | 6 | 20 | - |
| 6 | Monika Kaserer | Austria | 32 | 4 | 4 | 1 | 15 | 8 | - |
| 7 | Barbara Ann Cochran | United States | 26 | 1 | 6 | 11 | 8 | - | - |
| 8 | Lindy Cochran | United States | 23 | - | 20 | 3 | - | - | - |
| 9 | Lise-Marie Morerod | Switzerland | 22 | - | - | - | - | 11 | 11 |
| 10 | Danièle Debernard | France | 20 | - | - | - | - | - | 20 |

== Nations Cup ==
=== Overall ===
| Place | Country | Total | Men | Ladies |
|---|---|---|---|---|
| 1 | Austria | 1132 | 650 | 482 |
| 2 | Italy | 751 | 690 | 61 |
| 3 | Switzerland | 478 | 280 | 198 |
| 4 | West Germany | 427 | 124 | 303 |
| 5 | France | 237 | 9 | 228 |
| 6 | United States | 168 | 26 | 142 |
| 7 | Liechtenstein | 125 | 3 | 122 |
| 8 | Canada | 104 | 25 | 79 |
| 9 | Sweden | 88 | 88 | 0 |
| 10 | Spain | 46 | 46 | 0 |
| 11 | Poland | 34 | 34 | 19 |
| 12 | Norway | 19 | 17 | 2 |
| 13 | Australia | 17 | 17 | 0 |
| 14 | Czechoslovakia | 3 | 3 | 0 |

=== Men ===
| Place | Country | Total | DH | GS | SL | Racers | Wins |
|---|---|---|---|---|---|---|---|
| 1 | Italy | 690 | 144 | 337 | 209 | 12 | 9 |
| 2 | Austria | 650 | 287 | 201 | 162 | 15 | 5 |
| 3 | Switzerland | 280 | 208 | 41 | 31 | 10 | 4 |
| 4 | West Germany | 124 | 3 | 15 | 106 | 8 | 2 |
| 5 | Sweden | 88 | 0 | 37 | 51 | 1 | 0 |
| 6 | Spain | 46 | 0 | 0 | 46 | 1 | 1 |
| 7 | Poland | 34 | 0 | 0 | 34 | 3 | 0 |
| 8 | United States | 26 | 8 | 0 | 18 | 3 | 0 |
| 9 | Canada | 25 | 14 | 11 | 0 | 1 | 0 |
| 10 | Australia | 17 | 17 | 0 | 0 | 1 | 0 |
| | Norway | 17 | 0 | 17 | 0 | 1 | 0 |
| 12 | France | 9 | 0 | 3 | 6 | 4 | 0 |
| 13 | Liechtenstein | 3 | 0 | 0 | 3 | 1 | 0 |
| | Czechoslovakia | 3 | 0 | 3 | 0 | 1 | 0 |

=== Ladies ===
| Place | Country | Total | DH | GS | SL | Racers | Wins |
|---|---|---|---|---|---|---|---|
| 1 | Austria | 482 | 269 | 125 | 88 | 10 | 6 |
| 2 | West Germany | 303 | 16 | 88 | 199 | 4 | 6 |
| 3 | France | 228 | 37 | 94 | 97 | 8 | 1 |
| 4 | Switzerland | 198 | 74 | 87 | 37 | 4 | 0 |
| 5 | United States | 142 | 35 | 28 | 79 | 6 | 1 |
| 6 | Liechtenstein | 122 | 2 | 71 | 49 | 1 | 1 |
| 7 | Canada | 79 | 29 | 31 | 19 | 4 | 1 |
| 8 | Italy | 61 | 14 | 47 | 0 | 2 | 1 |
| 9 | Norway | 2 | 0 | 0 | 2 | 1 | 0 |
