= 1974–75 FIS Alpine Ski World Cup =

International sports competition

FIS Alpine Ski World Cup 1974/75
Discipline	Men	Women
Overall	(Italy) Gustav Thöni	(Austria) Annemarie Moser-Pröll
Downhill	(Austria) Franz Klammer	(Austria) Annemarie Moser-Pröll
Giant slalom	(Sweden) Ingemar Stenmark	(Austria) Annemarie Moser-Pröll
Slalom	(Sweden) Ingemar Stenmark	(Switzerland) Lise-Marie Morerod
Nations Cup	Italy	Austria
- Nations Cup overall: Austria

Competition
Locations	16	15
Individual	27	26

The 9th World Cup season began in December 1974 in France and concluded in March 1975 in Italy. Gustav Thöni of Italy would regain the overall title, his fourth overall title in five seasons. Annemarie Moser-Pröll of Austria won the women's overall title, her fifth consecutive.

Three major changes took place on the World Cup circuit this season. First, Alpine combined races were recognized as World Cup events for the first time; both the men's and women's seasons included three combined races, all of which were won by the overall winners (Thöni and Moser-Pröll); in fact, Thöni's three combined wins were directly responsible for his edging out Ingemar Stenmark for the title. Second, a parallel slalom race was held at the end of the season, as parallel slalom had become popular on the professional skiing tour due to the visible head-to-head competition. Although parallel slalom skiing was used a few more times in World Cup competition, beginning in 1976 it became a permanent part of the season-ending Nations Cup events.

Third, and more importantly, the new head of the International Olympic Committee, Lord Killanin, reached a compromise to preserve the "amateur" status of skiers receiving endorsements, manufacturer's fees, and other payments, as long as the payments were made to the skier's national association or Olympic committee and not directly to the skier, that also eliminated the prohibition on year-round training and competition in a sport. While further criticism of this rule, known as Olympics Rule 26, would continue and would lead to future problems, such as the banning of World Cup champions Stenmark and Hanni Wenzel from the 1984 Winter Olympics, the immediate impact of this change was to check the steady migration of World Cup skiers to the professional circuit. Partially as a result, World Cup races this season took place in Europe, North America, and Asia.

== Calendar ==
=== Men ===
Event key: DH – Downhill, SL – Slalom, GS – Giant slalom, KB – Combined, PS – Parallel slalom
Race	Season	Date	Place	Type	Winner	Second	Third
178	1	5 December 1974	(France) Val d'Isère	GS _{061}	(Italy) Piero Gros	(Sweden) Ingemar Stenmark	(Norway) Erik Håker
179	2	8 December 1974	(France) Val d'Isère	DH _{052}	(Austria) Franz Klammer	(Austria) Werner Grissmann	(West Germany) Michael Veith
180	3	15 December 1974	(Switzerland) St. Moritz	DH _{053}	(Austria) Franz Klammer	(Italy) Herbert Plank	(Austria) Werner Grissmann
181	4	17 December 1974	(Italy) Madonna di Campiglio	SL _{067}	(Sweden) Ingemar Stenmark	(Italy) Paolo De Chiesa	(Italy) Fausto Radici
182	5	18 December 1974	(Italy) Madonna di Campiglio	GS _{062}	(Italy) Piero Gros	(United States) Greg Jones	(Italy) Tino Pietrogiovanna
183	6	5 January 1975	(West Germany) Garmisch	DH _{054}	(Austria) Franz Klammer	(Austria) Werner Grissmann	(Austria) Josef Walcher
184	7	6 January 1975	(West Germany) Garmisch	SL _{068}	(Italy) Piero Gros	(Italy) Gustav Thöni	(Italy) Fausto Radici
185	8	11 January 1975	(Switzerland) Wengen	DH _{055}	(Austria) Franz Klammer	(Italy) Herbert Plank	(Norway) Erik Håker
186	9	12 January 1975	(Switzerland) Wengen	SL _{069}	(Sweden) Ingemar Stenmark	(Italy) Piero Gros	(Italy) Paolo De Chiesa
187	10	12 January 1975	(Switzerland) Wengen	KB _{001}	(Italy) Gustav Thöni	(Austria) David Zwilling	(Switzerland) Walter Tresch
188	11	13 January 1975	(Switzerland) Adelboden	GS _{063}	(Italy) Piero Gros	(Italy) Gustav Thöni	(Switzerland) Werner Mattle
189	12	18 January 1975	(Austria) Kitzbühel	DH _{056}	(Austria) Franz Klammer	(Italy) Gustav Thöni	(Austria) Werner Grissmann
190	13	19 January 1975	(Austria) Kitzbühel	SL _{070}	(Italy) Piero Gros	(Sweden) Ingemar Stenmark	(Italy) Paolo De Chiesa
191	14	19 January 1975	(Austria) Kitzbühel	KB _{002}	(Italy) Gustav Thöni	(Spain) Francisco Fernández Ochoa	(Austria) Franz Klammer
192	15	21 January 1975	(Austria) Fulpmes	GS _{064}	(Norway) Erik Håker	(Sweden) Ingemar Stenmark	(Austria) Hansi Hinterseer
193	16	26 January 1975	(Austria) Innsbruck	DH _{057}	(Austria) Franz Klammer	(Switzerland) Bernhard Russi	(Italy) Herbert Plank
194	17	30 January 1975	(France) Chamonix	SL _{071}	(Italy) Gustav Thöni	(Sweden) Ingemar Stenmark	(Austria) Hansi Hinterseer
195	18	1 February 1975	(France) Megève	DH _{058}	(Switzerland) Walter Vesti	(Switzerland) René Berthod	(Switzerland) Philippe Roux
196	19	30 January 1975; 1 February 1975	(France) Chamonix (SL) (France) Megève (DH)	KB _{003}	(Italy) Gustav Thöni	(Spain) Francisco Fernández Ochoa	(Norway) Erik Håker
197	20	21 February 1975	(Japan) Naeba	SL _{072}	(Austria) Hansi Hinterseer	(Sweden) Ingemar Stenmark	(West Germany) Christian Neureuther
198	21	23 February 1975	(Japan) Naeba	GS _{065}	(Sweden) Ingemar Stenmark	(Norway) Erik Håker	(Austria) Hansi Hinterseer
199	22	2 March 1975	(Canada) Garibaldi	GS _{066}	(Sweden) Ingemar Stenmark	(Switzerland) Heini Hemmi	(Italy) Gustav Thöni
200	23	9 March 1975	(United States) Jackson Hole	DH _{059}	(Austria) Franz Klammer	(West Germany) Michael Veith	(Switzerland) Rene Berthod
201	24	13 March 1975	(United States) Sun Valley	GS _{067}	(Sweden) Ingemar Stenmark	(Italy) Piero Gros	(Italy) Gustav Thöni
202	25	15 March 1975	(United States) Sun Valley	SL _{073}	(Italy) Gustav Thöni	(Italy) Piero Gros	(Sweden) Ingemar Stenmark
203	26	21 March 1975	(Italy) Val Gardena	DH _{060}	(Austria) Franz Klammer	(Norway) Erik Håker	(Switzerland) Bernhard Russi
204	27	23 March 1975	(Italy) Val Gardena	PS _{001}	(Italy) Gustav Thöni	(Sweden) Ingemar Stenmark	(Switzerland) Walter Tresch

=== Ladies ===
Event key: DH – Downhill, SL – Slalom, GS – Giant slalom, KB – Combined, PS – Parallel slalom
Race	Season	Date	Place	Type	Winner	Second	Third
172	1	4 December 1974	(France) Val d'Isère	DH _{046}	(Austria) Wiltrud Drexel	(Switzerland) Bernadette Zurbriggen	(France) Danièle Debernard
173	2	7 December 1974	(France) Val d'Isère	GS _{059}	(Austria) Annemarie Moser-Pröll	(Austria) Monika Kaserer	(France) Fabienne Serrat
174	3	12 December 1974	(Italy) Cortina d'Ampezzo	DH _{047}	(Austria) Annemarie Moser-Pröll	(United States) Cindy Nelson	(Austria) Wiltrud Drexel
175	4	13 December 1974	(Italy) Cortina d'Ampezzo	SL _{069}	(West Germany) Rosi Mittermaier	(France) Fabienne Serrat	(West Germany) Christa Zechmeister
176	5	21 December 1974	(Austria) Saalbach-Hinterglemm	DH _{048}	(United States) Cindy Nelson	(Switzerland) Marie-Theres Nadig	(West Germany) Rosi Mittermaier
177	6	4 January 1975	(West Germany) Garmisch	SL _{070}	(Switzerland) Lise-Marie Morerod	(West Germany) Christa Zechmeister	(Norway) Torill Fjeldstad
178	7	9 January 1975	(Switzerland) Grindelwald	GS _{060}	(Austria) Annemarie Moser-Pröll	(Liechtenstein) Hanni Wenzel	(West Germany) Rosi Mittermaier
179	8	10 January 1975	(Switzerland) Grindelwald	DH _{049}	(Austria) Annemarie Moser-Pröll	(West Germany) Rosi Mittermaier	(Switzerland) Marie-Theres Nadig
180	9	10 January 1975	(Switzerland) Grindelwald	KB _{001}	(Austria) Annemarie Moser-Pröll	(West Germany) Rosi Mittermaier	(Liechtenstein) Hanni Wenzel
181	10	11 January 1975	(Switzerland) Grindelwald	GS _{061}	(Austria) Annemarie Moser-Pröll	(France) Fabienne Serrat	(Liechtenstein) Hanni Wenzel
182	11	15 January 1975	(Austria) Schruns	DH _{050}	(Switzerland) Bernadette Zurbriggen	(Austria) Ingrid Schmid-Gfölner	(Switzerland) Marie-Theres Nadig
183	12	15 January 1975	(Austria) Schruns	KB _{002}	(Austria) Annemarie Moser-Pröll	(Liechtenstein) Hanni Wenzel	(Austria) Wiltrud Drexel
184	13	16 January 1975	(Austria) Schruns	SL _{071}	(West Germany) Christa Zechmeister	(Austria) Annemarie Moser-Pröll	(Liechtenstein) Hanni Wenzel
185	14	19 January 1975	(Socialist Federal Republic of Yugoslavia) Sarajevo	GS _{062}	(Austria) Annemarie Moser-Pröll	(Switzerland) Lise-Marie Morerod	(West Germany) Rosi Mittermaier
186	15	24 January 1975	(Austria) Innsbruck	DH _{051}	(Switzerland) Marie-Theres Nadig	(Austria) Annemarie Moser-Pröll	(France) Jacqueline Rouvier
187	16	29 January 1975	(France) St. Gervais	SL _{072}	(Switzerland) Lise-Marie Morerod	(Liechtenstein) Hanni Wenzel	(West Germany) Rosi Mittermaier
188	17	31 January 1975	(France) Chamonix	DH _{052}	(Switzerland) Bernadette Zurbriggen	(Austria) Annemarie Moser-Pröll	(Switzerland) Marie-Theres Nadig
189	18	29 January 1975; 31 January 1975	(France) St. Gervais (SL) (France) Chamonix (DH)	KB _{003}	(Austria) Annemarie Moser-Pröll	(Liechtenstein) Hanni Wenzel	(West Germany) Rosi Mittermaier
190	19	21 February 1975	(Japan) Naeba	SL _{073}	(Liechtenstein) Hanni Wenzel	(Switzerland) Lise-Marie Morerod	(West Germany) Christa Zechmeister
191	20	23 February 1975	(Japan) Naeba	GS _{063}	(Austria) Annemarie Moser-Pröll	(Austria) Monika Kaserer	(Italy) Christina Tisot
192	21	1 March 1975	(Canada) Garibaldi	GS _{064}	(United States) Cindy Nelson	(France) Fabienne Serrat	(Canada) Kathy Kreiner
193	22	11 March 1975	(United States) Jackson Hole	DH _{053}	(Switzerland) Marie-Theres Nadig	(Switzerland) Bernadette Zurbriggen	(Austria) Annemarie Moser-Pröll
194	23	13 March 1975	(United States) Sun Valley	GS _{065}	(Switzerland) Lise-Marie Morerod	(Austria) Monika Kaserer	(France) Fabienne Serrat
195	24	14 March 1975	(United States) Sun Valley	SL _{074}	(Liechtenstein) Hanni Wenzel	(Austria) Annemarie Moser-Pröll	(West Germany) Christa Zechmeister
196	25	20 March 1975	(Italy) Val Gardena	SL _{075}	(Switzerland) Lise-Marie Morerod	(Austria) Annemarie Moser-Pröll	(Austria) Monika Kaserer
197	26	22 March 1975	(Italy) Val Gardena	PS _{001}	(Austria) Monika Kaserer	(Italy) Claudia Giordani	(France) Fabienne Serrat

== Men ==
=== Overall ===
The Men's overall World Cup 1974/75 was also divided into three periods with only a part of the results from each period being retained for the Overall standings.

Place	Name	Country	Total
1	Gustav Thöni	Italy	250
2	Ingemar Stenmark	Sweden	245
3	Franz Klammer	Austria	240
4	Piero Gros	Italy	196
5	Erik Håker	Norway	147
6	Hansi Hinterseer	Austria	117
7	Herbert Plank	Italy	92
8	Werner Grissmann	Austria	87
9	Francisco Fernández-Ochoa	Spain	79
10	Paolo De Chiesa	Italy	74
11	Bernhard Russi	Switzerland	58
12	René Berthod	Switzerland	57
13	Michael Veith	West Germany	55
14	Walter Tresch	Switzerland	50
15	Fausto Radici	Italy	49

=== Downhill ===
In men's downhill World Cup 1974/75 the best 5 results count. Five racers had a point deduction, which are given in (). Franz Klammer won 6 races in a row and won the cup with maximum points. He won 8 races out of 9, but at the downhill of Megève one of his bindings opened and he did not finish the race; this meant also that he could not score the 15 points for a third place in the combined of Megève (which he would have gained easily after a decent slalom result in Chamonix two days earlier), and in the end he missed the first place in the men's overall World Cup by just 10 points.

Place	Name	Country	Total	2 (France)	3 (Switzerland)	6 (Germany)	8 (Switzerland)	12 (Austria)	16 (Austria)	18 (France)	23 (United States)	26 (Italy)
1	Franz Klammer	Austria	125	25	25	25	25	25	(25)	-	(25)	(25)
2	Werner Grissmann	Austria	81	20	15	20	11	15	(3)	-	-	(3)
3	Herbert Plank	Italy	71	-	20	8	20	(6)	15	8	-	(1)
4	Bernhard Russi	Switzerland	58	8	-	11	4	-	20	-	-	15
5	René Berthod	Switzerland	56	-	-	(1)	-	11	2	20	15	8
6	Erik Håker	Norway	53	3	-	-	15	-	4	11	(2)	20
7	Michael Veith	West Germany	47	15	-	-	8	4	-	-	20	-
8	Philippe Roux	France	40	-	-	-	-	3	-	15	11	11
9	Gustav Thöni	Italy	39	6	-	-	-	20	11	2	-	-
10	Walter Vesti	Switzerland	36	-	-	-	3	8	-	25	-	-

=== Giant slalom ===
In men's giant slalom World Cup 1974/75 the best 5 results count. One racer had a point deduction, which is given in ().

Place	Name	Country	Total	1 (France)	5 (Italy)	11 (Switzerland)	15 (Austria)	21 (Japan)	22 (Canada)	24 (United States)
1	Ingemar Stenmark	Sweden	115	20	-	-	20	25	25	25
2	Piero Gros	Italy	106	25	25	25	-	-	11	20
3	Erik Håker	Norway	67	15	6	1	25	20	-	-
4	Gustav Thöni	Italy	60	-	8	20	2	-	15	15
5	Hansi Hinterseer	Austria	55	11	(4)	6	15	15	-	8
6	Heini Hemmi	Switzerland	45	-	-	3	11	11	20	-
7	Thomas Hauser	Austria	35	-	-	11	8	8	8	-
8	Greg Jones	United States	33	-	20	-	-	-	2	11
9	Franz Klammer	Austria	31	8	11	-	6	6	-	-
10	Tino Pietrogiovanna	Italy	23	6	15	-	-	-	-	2

=== Slalom ===
In men's slalom World Cup 1974/75 the best 5 results count. Four racers had a point deduction, which are given in ().

Place	Name	Country	Total	4 (Italy)	7 (Germany)	9 (Switzerland)	13 (Austria)	17 (France)	20 (Japan)	25 (United States)	27 (Italy)
1	Ingemar Stenmark	Sweden	110	25	-	25	20	20	20	(15)	(20)
2	Gustav Thöni	Italy	106	-	20	11	-	25	(8)	25	25
3	Piero Gros	Italy	90	-	25	20	25	-	-	20	-
4	Paolo De Chiesa	Italy	61	20	8	15	15	-	-	3	-
5	Hansi Hinterseer	Austria	58	-	-	1	11	15	25	6	-
6	Fausto Radici	Italy	48	15	15	-	-	3	4	(1)	11
7	Christian Neureuther	West Germany	36	4	-	6	-	11	15	-	-
	Francisco Fernández-Ochoa	Spain	36	3	6	8	(3)	8	-	11	-
9	Jan Bachleda	Poland	27	-	11	-	6	-	-	4	6
10	Hansjörg Schlager	West Germany	22	-	4	3	-	4	11	-	-

=== Combined ===
There was no special discipline world cup for Combined awarded. All three results only count for the Overall World Cup. Gustav Thöni won all three competitions. This was the important key that enabled Thöni to defeat Ingemar Stenmark in the Overall World Cup standings.

Place	Name	Country	Total	10 (Switzerland)	14 (Austria)	19 (France)
1	Gustav Thöni	Italy	75	25	25	25
2	Francisco Fernández-Ochoa	Spain	40	-	20	20
3	Walter Tresch	Switzerland	26	15	11	-
	Erik Håker	Norway	26	11	-	15
5	Franz Klammer	Austria	21	6	15	-
6	David Zwilling	Austria	20	20	-	-
7	Jim Hunter	Canada	12	-	4	8
8	Herbert Plank	Italy	11	-	-	11
9	Roland Thöni	Italy	8	8	-	-
	Sepp Ferstl	West Germany	8	-	8	-
	Michael Veith	West Germany	8	2	6	-

== Ladies ==
=== Overall ===
The Women's overall World Cup 1974/75 was divided into two periods. From the first 14 races the best 7 results count and from the last 12 races the best 6 results count. Eight racers had a point deduction. Annemarie Moser-Pröll had a total deduction of 106 points. She won ten competitions and was unable to score points only in three events. This was her fifth overall win in a row.

Place	Name	Country	Total
1	Annemarie Moser-Pröll	Austria	305
2	Hanni Wenzel	Liechtenstein	199
3	Rosi Mittermaier	West Germany	166
4	Marie-Theres Nadig	Switzerland	154
5	Fabienne Serrat	France	153
6	Bernadette Zurbriggen	Switzerland	151
	Lise-Marie Morerod	Switzerland	151
8	Cindy Nelson	United States	138
9	Monika Kaserer	Austria	134
10	Christa Zechmeister	West Germany	127
11	Wiltrud Drexel	Austria	82
12	Kathy Kreiner	Canada	62
13	Irene Epple	West Germany	60
14	Danièle Debernard	France	57
15	Betsy Clifford	Canada	43

=== Downhill ===
In women's downhill World Cup 1974/75 the best 5 results count. Five racers had a point deduction, which are given in (). Annemarie Moser-Pröll won her fifth Downhill World Cup in a row. This record is still unbeaten.

Place	Name	Country	Total	1 (France)	3 (Italy)	5 (Austria)	8 (Switzerland)	11 (Austria)	15 (Austria)	17 (France)	22 (United States)
1	Annemarie Moser-Pröll	Austria	105	(4)	25	(4)	25	(8)	20	20	15
2	Bernadette Zurbriggen	Switzerland	101	20	-	-	11	25	(11)	25	20
3	Marie-Theres Nadig	Switzerland	100	-	-	20	15	15	25	(15)	25
4	Cindy Nelson	United States	75	11	20	25	8	-	-	11	(3)
5	Wiltrud Drexel	Austria	58	25	15	1	-	11	-	-	6
6	Rosi Mittermaier	West Germany	49	-	-	15	20	-	6	8	-
7	Irene Epple	West Germany	38	(2)	-	11	4	4	8	-	11
8	Danièle Debernard	France	32	15	11	-	3	-	3	-	-
9	Ingrid Schmid-Gfölner	Austria	24	-	-	-	2	20	2	-	-
10	Jacqueline Rouvier	France	23	-	8	-	-	-	15	-	-

=== Giant slalom ===
In women's giant slalom World Cup 1974/75 the best 5 results count. Three racers had a point deduction, which are given in (). Annemarie Moser-Pröll won five races in a row and won the cup with maximum points.

Place	Name	Country	Total	2 (France)	7 (Switzerland)	10 (Switzerland)	14 (Socialist Federal Republic of Yugoslavia)	20 (Japan)	21 (Canada)	23 (United States)
1	Annemarie Moser-Pröll	Austria	125	25	25	25	25	25	-	(8)
2	Fabienne Serrat	France	81	15	11	20	(3)	-	20	15
3	Monika Kaserer	Austria	74	20	6	8	-	20	(1)	20
4	Lise-Marie Morerod	Switzerland	53	2	-	-	20	6	-	25
5	Hanni Wenzel	Liechtenstein	42	-	20	15	1	-	-	6
6	Cindy Nelson	United States	40	-	3	-	6	3	25	3
7	Rosi Mittermaier	West Germany	36	6	15	-	15	-	-	-
8	Kathy Kreiner	Canada	34	-	8	-	-	-	15	11
9	Christa Zechmeister	West Germany	26	11	-	11	-	-	4	-
10	Marie-Theres Nadig	Switzerland	22	8	-	2	11	-	-	1

=== Slalom ===
In women's slalom World Cup 1974/75 the best 5 results count. Three racers had a point deduction, which are given in (). Lise-Marie Morerod won the cup with only four results.

Place	Name	Country	Total	4 (Italy)	6 (Germany)	12 (Austria)	16 (France)	19 (Japan)	24 (United States)	25 (Italy)	26 (Italy)
1	Lise-Marie Morerod	Switzerland	95	-	25	-	25	20	-	25	-
2	Hanni Wenzel	Liechtenstein	91	-	6	15	20	25	25	-	-
3	Christa Zechmeister	West Germany	90	15	20	25	(8)	15	15	(3)	-
4	Annemarie Moser-Pröll	Austria	79	11	-	20	(3)	-	20	20	8
5	Fabienne Serrat	France	63	20	-	11	-	-	6	11	15
6	Monika Kaserer	Austria	53	8	-	-	1	-	4	15	25
7	Rosi Mittermaier	West Germany	52	25	-	8	15	-	-	4	-
8	Claudia Giordani	Italy	31	-	-	-	-	11	-	-	20
9	Danièle Debernard	France	19	-	-	-	11	-	-	8	-
10	Torill Fjeldstad	Norway	17	-	15	-	-	-	-	-	2

=== Combined ===
There was no special discipline world cup for Combined awarded. All three results only count for the Overall World Cup. Annemarie Moser-Pröll won all three competitions.

Place	Name	Country	Total	9 (Switzerland)	13 (Austria)	18 (France)
1	Annemarie Moser-Pröll	Austria	75	25	25	25
2	Hanni Wenzel	Liechtenstein	55	15	20	20
3	Rosi Mittermaier	West Germany	36	20	1	15
4	Bernadette Zurbriggen	Switzerland	23	1	11	11
	Cindy Nelson	United States	23	11	4	8
6	Kathy Kreiner	Canada	16	8	8	-
7	Wiltrud Drexel	Austria	15	-	15	-
8	Fabienne Serrat	France	9	3	6	-
9	Marie-Theres Nadig	Switzerland	6	6	-	-
	Betsy Clifford	Canada	6	-	-	6

== Nations Cup ==
=== Overall ===
Place	Country	Total	Men	Ladies
1	Austria	1395	630	765
2	Italy	810	764	46
3	Switzerland	792	334	458
4	West Germany	557	148	409
5	France	303	15	288
6	Sweden	260	260	0
7	United States	256	85	171
8	Liechtenstein	223	18	205
9	Norway	165	148	17
10	Canada	141	36	105
11	Spain	79	79	0
12	Poland	29	29	0
13	Australia	16	16	0
14	Iran	11	0	11
15	Czechoslovakia	4	4	0

=== Men ===
Place	Country	Total	DH	GS	SL	KB	Racers	Wins
1	Italy	764	126	220	324	94	11	11
2	Austria	630	374	130	81	45	13	9
3	Switzerland	334	199	79	20	36	11	1
4	Sweden	260	0	115	145	0	1	5
5	West Germany	148	50	13	69	16	9	0
	Norway	148	55	67	0	26	1	1
7	United States	85	23	33	28	1	7	0
8	Spain	79	0	0	39	40	1	0
9	Canada	36	10	2	0	24	5	0
10	Poland	29	0	0	29	0	2	0
11	Liechtenstein	18	0	2	16	0	1	0
12	Australia	16	16	0	0	0	1	0
13	France	15	3	0	9	3	5	0
14	Czechoslovakia	4	0	4	0	0	1	0

=== Ladies ===
Place	Country	Total	DH	GS	SL	KB	Racers	Wins
1	Austria	765	257	241	167	100	11	12
2	Switzerland	458	227	87	112	32	3	8
3	West Germany	409	109	67	191	42	8	2
4	France	288	59	112	106	11	7	0
5	Liechtenstein	205	17	42	91	55	1	2
6	United States	171	81	52	15	23	8	2
7	Canada	105	14	50	19	22	2	0
8	Italy	46	0	15	31	0	2	0
9	Norway	17	0	0	17	0	1	0
10	Iran	11	0	0	11	0	1	0
