= 1972–73 FIS Alpine Ski World Cup =

International sports competition

FIS Alpine Ski World Cup 1972/73
Discipline	Men	Women
Overall	(Italy) Gustav Thöni	(Austria) Annemarie Pröll
Downhill	(Switzerland) Roland Collombin	(Austria) Annemarie Pröll
Giant slalom	(Austria) Hansi Hinterseer	(Austria) Monika Kaserer
Slalom	(Italy) Gustav Thöni	(France) Patricia Emonet
Nations Cup	Austria	Austria
- Nations Cup overall: Austria

Competition
Locations	15	15
Individual	24	24

The 7th World Cup season began in December 1972 in France and concluded in March 1973 in the United States. Gustav Thöni of Italy won his third consecutive overall title and Annemarie Pröll of Austria won the women's overall title, her third of five consecutive.

== Calendar ==
=== Men ===
Event key: DH – Downhill, SL – Slalom, GS – Giant slalom
Race	Season	Date	Place	Type	Winner	Second	Third
133	1	8 December 1972	(France) Val d'Isère	GS _{046}	(Italy) Piero Gros	(Norway) Erik Håker	(Italy) Helmuth Schmalzl
134	2	10 December 1972	(France) Val d'Isère	DH _{037}	(Austria) Reinhard Tritscher	(Austria) David Zwilling	(Italy) Marcello Varallo
135	3	15 December 1972	(Italy) Val Gardena	DH _{038}	(Switzerland) Roland Collombin	(Austria) Karl Cordin	(Austria) David Zwilling
136	4	17 December 1972	(Italy) Madonna di Campiglio	SL _{052}	(Italy) Piero Gros	(Italy) Gustav Thöni	(West Germany) Christian Neureuther
137	5	19 December 1972	(Italy) Madonna di Campiglio	GS _{047}	(Austria) David Zwilling	(Switzerland) Adolf Rösti	(Italy) Helmuth Schmalzl
138	6	6 January 1973	(West Germany) Garmisch	DH _{039}	(Switzerland) Roland Collombin	(Switzerland) Philippe Roux (Italy) Marcello Varallo	
139	7	7 January 1973	(West Germany) Garmisch	DH _{040}	(Switzerland) Roland Collombin	(Italy) Marcello Varallo	(Switzerland) Bernhard Russi
140	8	13 January 1973	(Switzerland) Grindelwald	DH _{041}	(Switzerland) Bernhard Russi	(Switzerland) Roland Collombin	(Austria) Reinhard Tritscher
141	9	14 January 1973	(Switzerland) Wengen	SL _{053}	(West Germany) Christian Neureuther	(Switzerland) Walter Tresch	(France) Claude Perrot
142	10	15 January 1973	(Switzerland) Adelboden	GS _{048}	(Italy) Gustav Thöni	(Austria) Hansi Hinterseer	(Norway) Erik Håker
143	11	19 January 1973	(France) Megève	GS _{049}	(France) Henri Duvillard	(Austria) Hansi Hinterseer	(Italy) Gustav Thöni
144	12	21 January 1973	(France) Megève	SL _{054}	(West Germany) Christian Neureuther	(Italy) Gustav Thöni	(Switzerland) Walter Tresch
145	13	27 January 1973	(Austria) Kitzbühel	DH _{042}	(Switzerland) Roland Collombin	(Switzerland) Bernhard Russi	(United States) Bob Cochran
146	14	28 January 1973	(Austria) Kitzbühel	SL _{055}	(France) Jean-Noël Augert	(Italy) Gustav Thöni	(Poland) Andrzej Bachleda
147	15	3 February 1973	(Austria) St. Anton	DH _{043}	(Switzerland) Bernhard Russi	(Austria) Franz Klammer	(Switzerland) Philippe Roux
148	16	4 February 1973	(Austria) St. Anton	SL _{056}	(Italy) Gustav Thöni	(West Germany) Christian Neureuther	(France) Henri Duvillard
149	17	11 February 1973	(Switzerland) St. Moritz	DH _{044}	(Austria) Werner Grissmann	(Austria) Josef Walcher	(Austria) Franz Klammer
150	18	2 March 1973	(Canada) Mt. St. Anne	GS _{050}	(West Germany) Max Rieger	(Austria) Hansi Hinterseer	(Austria) Franz Klammer
151	19	4 March 1973	(Canada) Mt. St. Anne	SL _{057}	(Italy) Gustav Thöni	(Italy) Ilario Pegorari	(West Germany) Christian Neureuther
152	20	8 March 1973	(United States) Anchorage	GS _{051}	(Austria) Hansi Hinterseer	(Switzerland) Adolf Rösti	(Austria) Josef Pechtl
153	21	12 March 1973	(Japan) Naeba	GS _{052}	(Norway) Erik Håker	(Austria) Hansi Hinterseer	(Switzerland) Adolf Rösti
154	22	15 March 1973	(Japan) Naeba	SL _{058}	(France) Jean-Noël Augert	(West Germany) Christian Neureuther	(Italy) Ilario Pegorari
155	23	23 March 1973	(United States) Heavenly Valley	SL _{059}	(France) Jean-Noël Augert	(United States) Bob Cochran	(Italy) Tino Pietrogiovanna
156	24	24 March 1973	(United States) Heavenly Valley	GS _{053}	(United States) Bob Cochran	(Italy) Erwin Stricker	(France) Jean-Noël Augert

=== Ladies ===
Event key: DH – Downhill, SL – Slalom, GS – Giant slalom
Race	Season	Date	Place	Type	Winner	Second	Third
131	1	7 December 1972	(France) Val d'Isère	DH _{033}	(Austria) Annemarie Pröll	(France) Jacqueline Rouvier	(Austria) Irmgard Lukasser
132	2	9 December 1972	(France) Val d'Isère	SL _{055}	(West Germany) Pamela Behr	(France) Odile Chalvin	(France) Patricia Emonet
133	3	19 December 1972	(Austria) Saalbach-Hinterglemm	DH _{034}	(Austria) Annemarie Pröll	(France) Jacqueline Rouvier	(Austria) Brigitte Totschnig
134	4	20 December 1972	(Austria) Saalbach-Hinterglemm	GS _{045}	(Austria) Annemarie Pröll	(Austria) Monika Kaserer	(Liechtenstein) Hanni Wenzel
135	5	2 January 1973	(Socialist Federal Republic of Yugoslavia) Maribor	SL _{056}	(France) Patricia Emonet	(West Germany) Pamela Behr	(West Germany) Rosi Mittermaier
136	6	9 January 1973	(West Germany) Pfronten	DH _{035}	(Austria) Annemarie Pröll	(Austria) Monika Kaserer	(Austria) Irmgard Lukasser
137	7	10 January 1973	(West Germany) Pfronten	DH _{036}	(Austria) Annemarie Pröll	(Austria) Irmgard Lukasser	(Austria) Ingrid Gfölner
138	8	16 January 1973	(Switzerland) Grindelwald	DH _{037}	(Austria) Annemarie Pröll	(Austria) Wiltrud Drexel	(Austria) Brigitte Totschnig
139	9	17 January 1973	(Switzerland) Grindelwald	SL _{057}	(Austria) Monika Kaserer	(West Germany) Rosi Mittermaier	(Canada) Judy Crawford
140	10	20 January 1973	(France) St. Gervais	GS _{046}	(Austria) Annemarie Pröll	(Austria) Monika Kaserer	(France) Jacqueline Rouvier
141	11	21 January 1973	(France) Les Contamines	GS _{047}	(Austria) Monika Kaserer	(West Germany) Traudl Treichl	(United States) Marilyn Cochran
142	12	25 January 1973	(France) Chamonix	DH _{038}	(Austria) Annemarie Pröll	(Austria) Wiltrud Drexel	(France) Jacqueline Rouvier
143	13	26 January 1973	(France) Chamonix	SL _{058}	(United States) Marilyn Cochran	(West Germany) Rosi Mittermaier	(Austria) Monika Kaserer
144	14	1 February 1973	(Austria) Schruns	DH _{039}	(Austria) Annemarie Pröll	(Austria) Wiltrud Drexel	(Austria) Ingrid Gfölner
145	15	2 February 1973	(Austria) Schruns	SL _{059}	(West Germany) Rosi Mittermaier	(France) Patricia Emonet	(Spain) Conchita Puig
146	16	10 February 1973	(Switzerland) St. Moritz	DH _{040}	(Austria) Annemarie Pröll	(Austria) Ingrid Gfölner	(Austria) Wiltrud Drexel
147	17	11 February 1973	(Italy) Abetone	GS _{048}	(Austria) Monika Kaserer	(West Germany) Traudl Treichl	(United States) Sandra Poulsen
148	18	2 March 1973	(Canada) Mt. St. Anne	GS _{049}	(Austria) Annemarie Pröll	(Switzerland) Bernadette Zurbriggen	(Switzerland) Marie-Theres Nadig
149	19	3 March 1973	(Canada) Mt. St. Anne	SL _{060}	(France) Patricia Emonet	(France) Danièle Debernard	(France) Britt Lafforgue
150	20	7 March 1973	(United States) Anchorage	GS _{050}	(Switzerland) Bernadette Zurbriggen	(Austria) Monika Kaserer	(Canada) Kathy Kreiner
151	21	13 March 1973	(Japan) Naeba	SL _{061}	(France) Danièle Debernard	(Liechtenstein) Hanni Wenzel	(United States) Barbara Cochran
152	22	15 March 1973	(Japan) Naeba	GS _{051}	(United States) Marilyn Cochran	(Italy) Claudia Giordani	(Austria) Annemarie Pröll
153	23	22 March 1973	(United States) Heavenly Valley	SL _{062}	(France) Patricia Emonet	(France) Fabienne Serrat	(West Germany) Christa Zechmeister
154	24	23 March 1973	(United States) Heavenly Valley	GS _{052}	(France) Patricia Emonet	(Austria) Monika Kaserer	(France) Christine Rolland

== Men ==
=== Overall ===
The Men's overall World Cup 1972/73 was divided into three periods. From the first 5 races the best 3 results count, from the next 9 races (Race No 6 to No 14) the best 5 results count and from the last 10 races the best 6 results count. Two racers had a point deduction. Gustav Thöni won his third Overall World Cup in a row!

Place	Name	Country	Total
1	Gustav Thöni	Italy	166
2	David Zwilling	Austria	151
3	Roland Collombin	Switzerland	131
4	Christian Neureuther	West Germany	120
	Hansi Hinterseer	Austria	120
6	Bernhard Russi	Switzerland	106
7	Jean-Noël Augert	France	104
8	Franz Klammer	Austria	93
	Bob Cochran	United States	93
10	Piero Gros	Italy	91
11	Henri Duvillard	France	90
12	Adolf Rösti	Switzerland	74
13	Erik Håker	Norway	72
14	Walter Tresch	Switzerland	65
15	Marcello Varallo	Italy	64

=== Downhill ===
In men's downhill World Cup 1972/73 the best 5 results count. Three racers had a point deduction, which are given in ().

Place	Name	Country	Total	2 (France)	3 (Italy)	6 (Germany)	7 (Germany)	8 (Switzerland)	13 (Austria)	15 (Austria)	17 (Switzerland)
1	Roland Collombin	Switzerland	120	(11)	25	25	25	20	25	-	-
2	Bernhard Russi	Switzerland	96	(6)	(4)	11	15	25	20	25	-
3	Marcello Varallo	Italy	64	15	1	20	20	-	8	-	-
4	Franz Klammer	Austria	62	-	8	-	-	8	11	20	15
	David Zwilling	Austria	62	20	15	8	8	(6)	-	(8)	11
6	Karl Cordin	Austria	53	8	20	-	11	11	-	3	-
7	Reinhard Tritscher	Austria	49	25	3	-	-	15	-	-	6
8	Philippe Roux	Switzerland	44	1	-	20	-	2	6	15	-
9	Bob Cochran	United States	36	6	-	4	-	-	15	11	-
10	Werner Grissmann	Austria	29	-	-	-	-	4	-	-	25

=== Giant slalom ===
In men's giant slalom World Cup 1972/73 the best 5 results count. One racers had a point deduction, which is given in (). In every race there was a different winner!

Place	Name	Country	Total	1 (France)	5 (Italy)	10 (Switzerland)	11 (France)	18 (Canada)	20 (United States)	21 (Japan)	24 (United States)
1	Hansi Hinterseer	Austria	105	(6)	-	20	20	20	25	20	(6)
2	Erik Håker	Norway	71	20	-	15	-	-	11	25	-
3	Adolf Rösti	Switzerland	66	-	20	-	-	11	20	15	-
4	Piero Gros	Italy	55	25	-	-	8	8	3	11	-
	Gustav Thöni	Italy	55	4	-	25	15	-	-	-	11
6	David Zwilling	Austria	49	-	25	-	11	-	2	8	3
7	Helmuth Schmalzl	Italy	48	15	15	11	1	-	-	6	-
8	Henri Duvillard	France	46	-	11	8	25	-	-	2	-
9	Franz Klammer	Austria	31	-	8	4	-	15	-	4	-
10	Max Rieger	West Germany	26	1	-	-	-	25	-	-	-
11	Bob Cochran	United States	25	-	-	-	-	-	-	-	25

=== Slalom ===
In men's slalom World Cup 1972/73 the best 5 results count. Three racers had a point deduction, which are given in ().

Place	Name	Country	Total	4 (Italy)	9 (Switzerland)	12 (France)	14 (Austria)	16 (Austria)	19 (Canada)	22 (Japan)	23 (United States)
1	Gustav Thöni	Italy	110	20	-	20	20	25	25	-	(1)
2	Christian Neureuther	West Germany	105	15	25	25	-	20	(15)	20	-
3	Jean-Noël Augert	France	86	-	-	-	25	11	-	25	25
4	Walter Tresch	Switzerland	57	3	20	15	8	(3)	11	-	-
5	Ilario Pegorari	Italy	38	-	-	-	-	1	20	15	2
6	Piero Gros	Italy	36	25	-	-	11	-	-	-	-
	Henri Duvillard	France	36	-	11	6	-	15	-	-	4
8	David Zwilling	Austria	33	2	-	11	-	8	6	-	6
9	Bob Cochran	United States	32	11	-	1	-	-	-	-	20
10	Tino Pietrogiovanna	Italy	29	6	6	-	-	2	-	-	15

== Ladies ==
=== Overall ===
The Women's overall World Cup 1972/73 was most likely also divided into periods.

Place	Name	Country	Total
1	Annemarie Pröll	Austria	297
2	Monika Kaserer	Austria	223
3	Patricia Emonet	France	163
4	Rosi Mittermaier	West Germany	131
5	Hanni Wenzel	Liechtenstein	112
6	Wiltrud Drexel	Austria	106
7	Jacqueline Rouvier	France	103
8	Marilyn Cochran	United States	84
9	Ingrid Gfölner	Austria	83
10	Irmgard Lukasser	Austria	65
11	Bernadette Zurbriggen	Switzerland	64
	Pamela Behr	West Germany	64
13	Danièle Debernard	France	60
14	Traudl Treichl	West Germany	57
	Christine Rolland	France	57

=== Downhill ===
In women's downhill World Cup 1972/73 the best 5 results counted. Five racers had a point deduction, which are given in (). Annemarie Pröll won all competitions and won the cup with maximum points. She won her third Downhill World Cup in a row. The Austrians won 21 out of 24 available podium-places. Only Jacqueline Rouvier from France was able to climb on the podium with them three times.

Place	Name	Country	Total	1 (France)	3 (Austria)	6 (Germany)	7 (Germany)	8 (Switzerland)	12 (France)	14 (Austria)	16 (Switzerland)
1	Annemarie Pröll	Austria	125	25	25	25	25	25	(25)	(25)	(25)
2	Wiltrud Drexel	Austria	86	11	-	-	-	20	20	20	15
3	Jacqueline Rouvier	France	72	20	20	-	(1)	(4)	15	6	11
4	Ingrid Gfölner	Austria	72	-	-	(1)	15	6	11	15	20
5	Irmgard Lukasser	Austria	61	15	3	15	20	-	-	8	-
6	Brigitte Totschnig	Austria	45	8	15	3	-	15	-	4	(1)
7	Brigitte Schroll	Austria	30	6	6	6	4	-	8	(3)	(4)
8	Monika Kaserer	Austria	28	-	-	20	8	-	-	-	-
9	Rosi Mittermaier	West Germany	23	-	4	2	6	8	3	-	-
10	Marie-Theres Nadig	Switzerland	22	-	11	11	-	-	-	-	-

=== Giant slalom ===
In women's giant slalom World Cup 1972/73 the best 5 results count. Five racers had a point deduction, which are given in ().

Place	Name	Country	Total	4 (Austria)	10 (France)	11 (France)	17 (Italy)	18 (Canada)	20 (United States)	22 (Japan)	24 (United States)
1	Monika Kaserer	Austria	110	20	20	25	25	(4)	20	(6)	(20)
2	Annemarie Pröll	Austria	94	25	25	(3)	(3)	25	-	15	4
3	Hanni Wenzel	Liechtenstein	53	15	11	8	8	-	11	-	(1)
4	Patricia Emonet	France	52	11	-	4	-	6	6	(1)	25
5	Bernadette Zurbriggen	Switzerland	51	-	-	-	6	20	25	-	-
6	Traudl Treichl	West Germany	46	-	1	20	20	3	2	-	-
7	Marilyn Cochran	United States	44	-	-	15	-	-	4	25	-
8	Rosi Mittermaier	West Germany	40	-	8	2	11	(1)	8	11	-
9	Jacqueline Rouvier	France	26	-	15	11	-	-	-	-	-
	Marie-Theres Nadig	Switzerland	26	-	4	6	-	15	1	-	-

=== Slalom ===
In women's slalom World Cup 1972/73 the best 5 results count. Three racers a had point deduction, which are given in ().

Place	Name	Country	Total	2 (France)	5 (Socialist Federal Republic of Yugoslavia)	9 (Switzerland)	13 (France)	15 (Austria)	19 (Canada)	21 (Japan)	23 (United States)
1	Patricia Emonet	France	110	15	25	-	(1)	20	25	-	25
2	Rosi Mittermaier	West Germany	80	-	15	20	20	25	-	-	-
3	Monika Kaserer	Austria	67	8	-	25	15	-	-	8	11
4	Danièle Debernard	France	56	11	-	-	-	-	20	25	-
	Pamela Behr	West Germany	56	25	20	-	-	8	-	-	3
6	Hanni Wenzel	Liechtenstein	49	3	11	11	-	-	(3)	20	4
7	Christine Rolland	France	40	2	-	-	8	(2)	11	11	8
8	Judy Crawford	Canada	39	6	6	15	-	6	-	6	-
9	Marilyn Cochran	United States	36	-	-	-	25	11	-	-	-
10	Barbara Ann Cochran	United States	33	-	-	8	2	-	8	15	-
	Fabienne Serrat	France	33	-	4	-	-	3	6	-	20

== Nations Cup ==
=== Overall ===
Place	Country	Total	Men	Ladies
1	Austria	1554	642	912
2	France	721	235	486
3	Switzerland	586	450	136
4	Italy	556	517	39
5	West Germany	478	183	295
6	United States	255	108	147
7	Canada	114	11	103
	Liechtenstein	114	2	112
9	Norway	97	72	25
10	Poland	54	54	-
11	Spain	32	13	19
12	San Marino	5	0	5
13	Finland	1	0	1
	Japan	1	1	0

=== Men ===
Place	Country	Total	DH	GS	SL	Racers	Wins
1	Austria	642	319	257	66	17	4
2	Italy	517	90	185	242	13	5
3	Switzerland	450	294	85	71	8	6
4	France	235	13	75	147	4	4
5	West Germany	183	0	38	145	5	3
6	United States	108	48	25	35	5	1
7	Norway	72	1	71	0	1	1
8	Poland	54	0	11	43	2	0
9	Spain	13	0	2	11	1	0
10	Canada	11	0	11	0	1	0
11	Liechtenstein	2	2	0	0	1	0
12	Japan	1	0	0	1	1	0

=== Ladies ===
Place	Country	Total	DH	GS	SL	Racers	Wins
1	Austria	912	549	283	80	12	14
2	France	486	89	109	288	8	5
3	West Germany	295	32	98	165	5	2
4	United States	147	10	65	72	4	2
5	Switzerland	136	43	87	6	6	1
6	Liechtenstein	112	6	54	52	1	0
7	Canada	103	20	37	46	3	0
8	Italy	39	10	23	6	3	0
9	Norway	25	0	0	25	1	0
10	Spain	19	0	0	19	1	0
11	San Marino	5	0	4	1	1	0
12	Finland	1	1	0	0	1	0
