= Roland Collombin =

Swiss alpine skier (1951–2026)

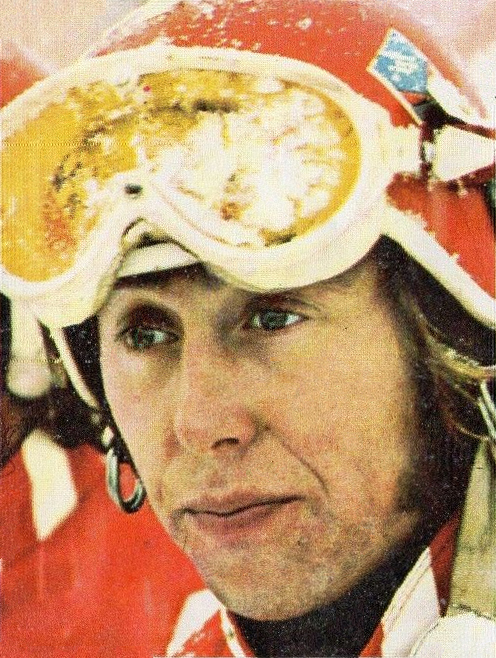
- Collombin c. 1973

Personal information
- Born: 17 February 1951 Versegères, Valais, Switzerland
- Died: 10 July 2026 (aged 75) Versegères, Valais, Switzerland
- Height: 1.75 m (5 ft 9 in)

Skiing career
- Sport: Alpine skiing
- Retired: December 1975 (age 24)
- Disciplines: Downhill
- World Cup debut: 12 December 1971 (1st top 10) (age 20)

Olympics
- Teams: 1 – (1972)
- Medals: 1 (0 gold)

World Championships
- Teams: 2 – (1972, 1974) includes Olympics
- Medals: 1 (0 gold)

World Cup
- Seasons: 3 – (1972–74)
- Wins: 8 – (8 DH)
- Podiums: 11 – (11 DH)
- Overall titles: 0 – (3rd in 1973)
- Discipline titles: 2 – (DH, 1973, 1974)
Medal record
Representing Switzerland
Olympic Games
World Championships
Silver medal – second place	1972 Sapporo	Downhill

Roland Collombin (17 February 1951 – 10 July 2026) was a Swiss World Cup alpine ski racer, a two-time World Cup downhill champion, and Olympic silver medalist.

== Racing career ==
Born in Versegères in the canton of Valais, Collombin made his first World Cup top ten finish at age 20 in December 1971 with a seventh place in the downhill at Val-d'Isère, France. Two months later, he won the silver medal in the downhill at the 1972 Winter Olympics at Sapporo, Japan, finishing behind countryman Bernhard Russi.

Collombin dominated the event over the next two World Cup seasons, 1973 and 1974, and won the World Cup season titles in downhill.

In January 1974, Collombin won the month's four downhills in consecutive weeks, which included the two classics: the Lauberhorn at Wengen, Switzerland, and the Hahnenkamm at Kitzbühel, Austria. Collombin had finished second in the previous two downhills in December 1973 for six consecutive downhill podiums. The repeat win at Kitzbühel was in record time, besting Jean-Claude Killy's mark of 1967, but was Collombin's last finish in international competition. (Franz Klammer of Austria broke the record at Kitzbühel the following year.)

The World Championships were held in Switzerland in February 1974 at St. Moritz. The Swiss team had won seven medals at the Olympics two years earlier in Japan, but managed just one at home, a bronze in the women's slalom (by Lise-Marie Morerod). Collombin could not continue his January success; he fell in the downhill and did not finish, but he was 0.45 seconds behind winner David Zwilling before he did fall, perhaps too big a margin to take the win.

=== Injuries ===
On 8 December 1974, Collombin fell in the season's first downhill at Val-d'Isère and bruised his spine, ending his 1975 season. In his absence, Franz Klammer of Austria won the first of his four straight downhill season titles. Collombin attempted a comeback on 7 December 1975 at Val-d'Isère, but fell in the first training at the same jump as the year before and broke two vertebrae, being paralyzed for two days and ending his racing career. That jump has been called "Bosse à Collombin" since that time. Nearly paralyzed, Collombin did not walk again until mid-February, after the 1976 Winter Olympics in Innsbruck. He finished his World Cup career with eight victories and three runner-up finishes, all in downhill.

By now, Collombin was a viniculturist, wine merchant, and hotelier in Versegères.

== After ski-racing life ==
Collombin and his wife Sarah operated a guest house in Versegères, and they had a product line of wines. In late 2014, they opened a raclette bar in Martigny named "La Streif", in reference to the challenging downhill course in Kitzbühel, Austria, where he won twice (1973, 1974).

== Death ==
Collombin died on 10 July 2026, at the age of 75, following a two-year battle with throat and liver cancer.

== World Cup results ==
=== Season titles ===
Season	Discipline
1973	Downhill
1974	Downhill

=== Season standings ===
Season	Age	Overall	Slalom	Giant Slalom	Super G	Downhill	Combined
1972	21	38	—	—	not run	15	not awarded
1973	22	3	—	—	not run	1	not awarded
1974	23	4	—	—	not run	1	not awarded
1975	24	injured at first DH race, out for season					
1976	25	injured at first DH race, out for season					

=== Top ten finishes ===
- 8 wins – (8 DH)
- 11 podiums – (11 DH), 14 top tens

Season	Date	Location	Discipline	Place
1972	12 December 1971	Val-d'Isère, France	Downhill	7th
1972	15 January 1972	Kitzbühel, Austria	Downhill	7th
1972	(Japan) 1972 Winter Olympics			
1973	10 December 1972	Val-d'Isère, France	Downhill	4th
1973	15 December 1972	Val Gardena, Italy	Downhill	1st
1973	6 January 1973	Garmisch, West Germany	Downhill	1st
1973	7 January 1973	Garmisch, West Germany	Downhill	1st
1973	13 January 1973	Grindelwald, Switzerland	Downhill	2nd
1973	27 January 1973	Kitzbühel, Austria	Downhill	1st
1974	18 December 1973	Zell am See, Austria	Downhill	2nd
1974	22 December 1973	Schladming, Austria	Downhill	2nd
1974	6 January 1974	Garmisch, West Germany	Downhill	1st
1974	12 January 1974	Avoriaz, France	Downhill	1st
1974	19 January 1974	Wengen, Switzerland	Downhill	1st
1974	26 January 1974	Kitzbühel, Austria	Downhill	1st

== World championship results ==
Year	Age	Slalom	Giant Slalom	Super-G	Downhill	Combined
1972	20	—	—	not run	2	—
1974	22	—	—	not run	DNF	—

From 1948 through 1980, the Winter Olympics were also the World Championships for alpine skiing.

== Olympic results ==
Year	Age	Slalom	Giant Slalom	Super-G	Downhill	Combined
1972	20	—	—	not run	2	not run
