= Emonet =

Emonet is a surname. Notable people with the surname include:

- Claudine Emonet (born 1962), French alpine skier
- Patricia Emonet (born 1956), French alpine skier
