= Christian Neureuther =

German alpine skier

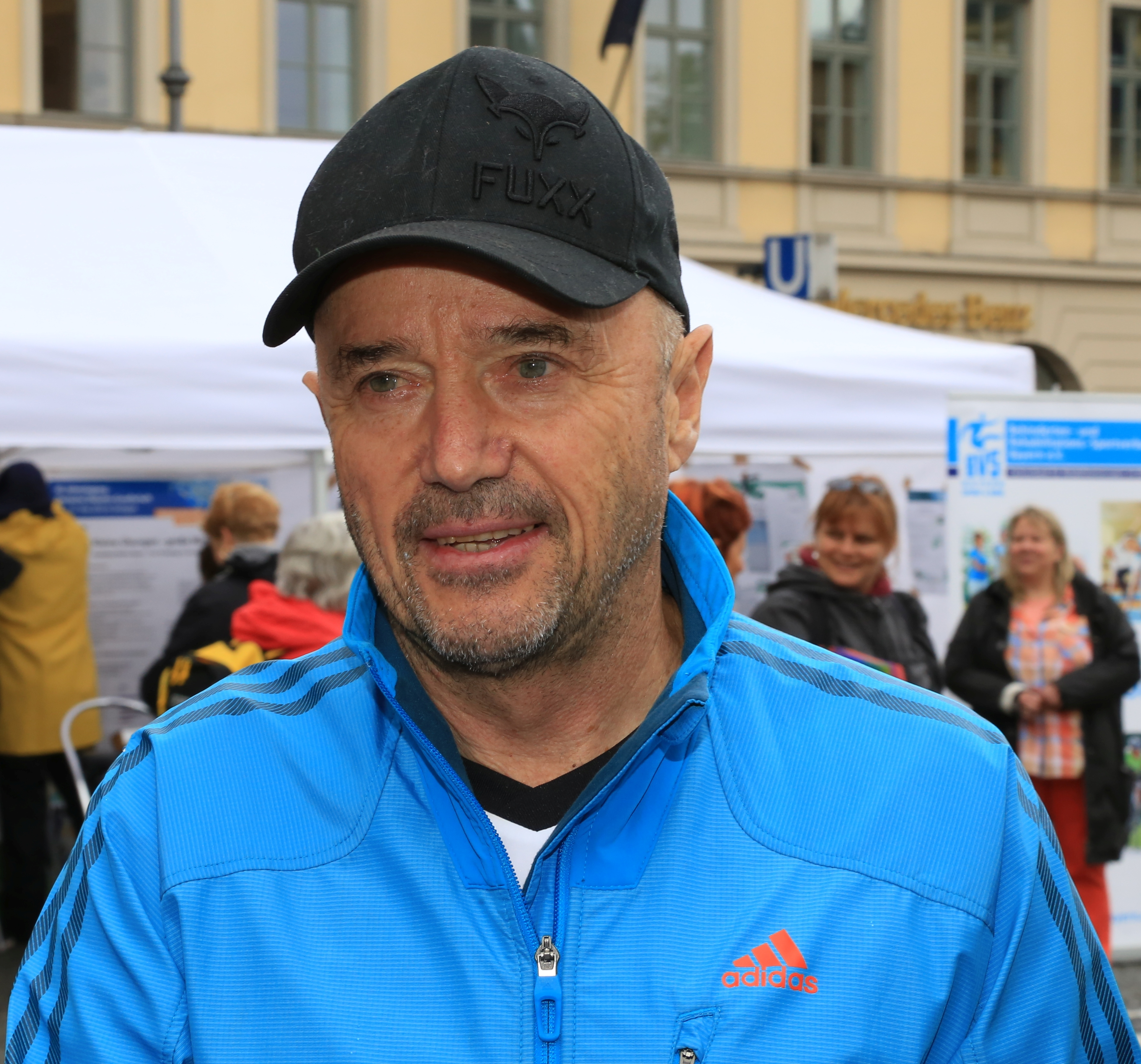
- Neureuther in 2014

Personal information
- Born: 28 April 1949 (age 77) Garmisch-Partenkirchen, Bavaria, Germany
- Height: 178 cm (5 ft 10 in)

Skiing career
- Sport: Alpine skiing
- Retired: February 1981 (age 31)
- Disciplines: Slalom, giant slalom
- World Cup debut: December 1969 (age 20)

Olympics
- Teams: 3 – (1972, 1976, 1980)
- Medals: 0

World Championships
- Teams: 5 – (1972–1980) includes 3 Olympics
- Medals: 0

World Cup
- Seasons: 12 – (1970–1981)
- Wins: 6 – (6 SL)
- Podiums: 20 – (20 SL)
- Overall titles: 0 – (4th in 1973)
- Discipline titles: 0 – (2nd in SL, 1973, 1974)

Christian Neureuther (born 28 April 1949) is a former World Cup alpine ski racer from Germany.

== Racing career ==
Born and raised in Garmisch-Partenkirchen, Bavaria, Neureuther specialized in the slalom and won six World Cup races and attained twenty podiums. He competed for West Germany in three Winter Olympics (1972, 1976, and 1980) and was fifth in the slalom in both 1976 and 1980. Neureuther was the runner-up to Gustav Thöni in the World Cup season slalom standings in 1973 and 1974; he was fourth overall in 1973 and ninth in 1974.

== Personal ==
Until her death in 2023, Neureuther was married to Rosi Mittermaier, a double gold medalist at the 1976 Winter Olympics and the overall World Cup champion in 1976. Married in 1980, they are the parents of Felix Neureuther (b.1984), a retired World Cup ski racer for Germany.

== World Cup results ==
=== Season standings ===
Season	Age	Overall	Slalom	Giant Slalom	Super G	Downhill	Combined
1970	20	25	17	19	not run	—	not awarded
1971	21	8	6	8	not run	—	not awarded
1972	22	32	13	23	not run	—	not awarded
1973	23	4	2	—	not run	—	not awarded
1974	24	9	2	25	not run	—	not awarded
1975	25	21	7	—	not run	—	not awarded
1976	26	26	6	—	not run	—	—
1977	27	28	9	—	not run	—	not awarded
1978	28	34	14	—	not run	—	not awarded
1979	29	14	3	—	not run	—	not awarded
1980	30	16	3	—	not run	—	—
1981	31	73	27	—	not run	—	

Points were only awarded for top ten finishes (see scoring system).

=== Race podiums ===
- 6 wins – (6 SL)
- 20 podiums – (20 SL); 59 top tens

Season	Date	Location	Discipline	Place
1971	30 January 1971	Megève, France	Slalom	3rd
1971	25 February 1971	(United States) Heavenly Valley, US	Slalom	2nd
1973	17 December 1972	Madonna di Campiglio, Italy	Slalom	3rd
1973	14 January 1973	Wengen, Switzerland	Slalom	1st
1973	21 January 1973	Megève, France	Slalom	1st
1973	4 February 1973	St. Anton, Austria	Slalom	2nd
1973	4 March 1973	Mt. St. Anne, Canada	Slalom	3rd
1973	15 March 1973	Naeba, Japan	Slalom	2nd
1974	17 December 1973	Vipiteno, Italy	Slalom	3rd
1974	5 January 1974	Garmisch, West Germany	Slalom	1st
1974	20 January 1974	Wengen, Switzerland	Slalom	1st
1975	21 February 1975	Naeba, Japan	Slalom	3rd
1976	11 January 1976	Wengen, Switzerland	Slalom	3rd
1977	18 March 1977	Voss, Norway	Slalom	3rd
1979	13 December 1978	Madonna di Campiglio, Italy	Slalom	3rd
1979	9 January 1979	Crans-Montana, Switzerland	Slalom	1st
1979	21 January 1979	Kitzbühel, Austria	Slalom	1st
1979	17 March 1979	Furano, Japan	Slalom	2nd
1980	13 January 1980	Kitzbühel, Austria	Slalom	2nd
1980	27 February 1980	(United States) Waterville Valley, USA	Slalom	2nd

== World championship results ==
Year	Age	Slalom	Giant Slalom	Super-G	Downhill	Combined
1970	20	DNF	17	not run	—	—
1972	22	11	DNF2	not run	—	—
1974	24	DNF	—	not run	—	—
1976	26	5	30	not run	—	—
1978	28	6	—	not run	—	—
1980	30	5	—	not run	—	—

From 1948 through 1980, the Winter Olympics were also the World Championships for alpine skiing.
At the World Championships from 1954 through 1980, the combined was a "paper race" using the results of the three events (DH, GS, SL).

== Olympic results ==
Year	Age	Slalom	Giant Slalom	Super-G	Downhill	Combined
1972	22	11	DNF2	not run	—	not run
1976	26	5	30	not run	—	not run
1980	30	5	—	not run	—	not run
