= Treichl =

Treichl is a surname. Notable people with the surname include:

- Andreas Treichl (born 1952), Austrian bank manager
- Markus Treichl (born 1993), Austrian bobsledder
- Traudl Treichl (born 1950), German skier
