= Bernhard Russi =

Swiss alpine skier

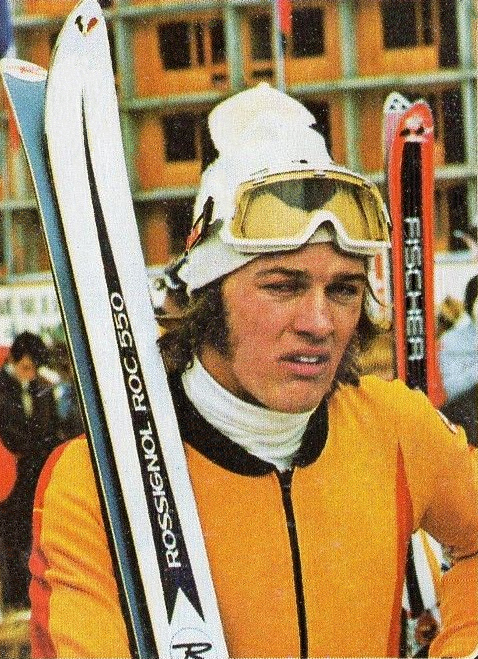
- Bernhard Russi in 1972

Personal information
- Born: 20 August 1948 (age 78) Andermatt, Uri, Switzerland
- Height: 183 cm (6 ft 0 in)
- Website: bernhardrussi.ch

Skiing career
- Sport: Alpine skiing
- Club: SC Gotthard Andermatt
- Retired: March 1978 (age 29)
- Disciplines: Downhill, giant slalom
- World Cup debut: 8 January 1968 (age 19)

Olympics
- Teams: 2 – (1972, 1976)
- Medals: 2 (1 gold)

World Championships
- Teams: 5 – (1970–1978) (includes two Olympics)
- Medals: 3 (2 gold)

World Cup
- Seasons: 9 – (1970–1978)
- Wins: 10 – (9 DH, 1 GS)
- Podiums: 28 – (27 DH, 1 GS)
- Overall titles: 0 – (5th in 1971, '72, '77)
- Discipline titles: 2 – (2 DH: 1971, 1972)
Medal record
Men's alpine skiing
Representing Switzerland
World Cup race podiums
Event	1st	2nd	3rd
Giant slalom	1	0	0
Downhill	9	6	12
Total	10	6	12
Olympic Games
Gold medal – first place	1972 Sapporo	Downhill
Silver medal – second place	1976 Innsbruck	Downhill
World Championships
Gold medal – first place	1970 Val Gardena	Downhill
Gold medal – first place	1972 Sapporo	Downhill
Silver medal – second place	1976 Innsbruck	Downhill

Bernhard Russi (born 20 August 1948) is a former World Cup alpine ski racer from Switzerland. Born in Andermatt in the canton of Uri, he is an Olympic, World Cup, and World champion in the downhill event.

== Racing career ==
Russi made his World Cup debut at age 19 in January 1968 at a giant slalom in Adelboden. After two races in 1968 and six in 1969, he joined the World Cup circuit full-time in December 1969. However, his racing career was set back at this time by his work as a stuntman in the movie On Her Majesty’s Secret Service which was filmed in Switzerland and during which he fractured a cervical vertebra. After a period of rehabilitation from this injury, he was able, for the first time in several months, to compete in the downhill Race at Val d'Isère on 14 December 1969, in which he placed 14th. He gained World Cup Points by recording his first World Cup top-ten finish (tenth in the downhill on 10 January on the Lauberhorn piste in Wengen). He went on to achieve a fourth place in the downhill at Garmisch-Partenkirchen on 1 February, leading to him being selected for the Swiss team at the 1970 World Championships, where he won his first event, the downhill, ahead of Karl Cordin of Austria and Australian Malcolm Milne. It was a race with fresh snow, and he was the 15th racer on the start list - a good number for such conditions. He won despite suffering a hand fracture a week before in a practice race, contending with the pain during his winning run. Notably, he skied his winning run without ski wax as his coach Paul Berlinger scraped the wax off his skis directly before the start. Because the World Championships counted towards the World Cup at this time, his World Championship win was also his first World Cup race victory. Two years later at the 1972 Olympics in Sapporo, Japan, he won the gold medal in the same discipline on Mt. Eniwa. Countryman Roland Collombin secured the silver and a Swiss one-two. Russi won the World Cup season title in downhill in 1971 and 1972. That year, he was named Swiss Sportsman of the Year for the second time, and he was also awarded the Skieur d’Or, for the world's ski racer of the year, and the Étoile d’Or (the Gold Star).

His performance in the 1974 World Championships on home snow was disappointing; he was thirteenth in the downhill at St. Moritz. At the 1976 Olympics in Innsbruck, Austria, Russi nearly retained his Olympic title with a very fast time in the downhill at Patscherkofel, but took the silver medal. The third racer on the course, he finished 0.33 seconds behind Franz Klammer of Austria, who started fifteenth, the last of the top seeds. To date (2018) no men's Olympic champion in the downhill has successfully defended his title; Russi remains the sole defender to medal.

As in 1974, his performance in the 1978 World Championships at Garmisch was disappointing, finishing fourteenth in the downhill in late January. As a result of this, he retired from international competition a few days later with ten World Cup victories, 28 podiums, and 52 top ten finishes. In addition to his two downhill titles in 1971 and 1972, Russi was second in 1973 and third in 1976 and 1977. His best finish in the overall standings was fifth, achieved three times in 1971, 1972, and 1977.

From 1948 through 1980, the Winter Olympics also served as the world championships for alpine skiing. During the early seasons of the World Cup, the Olympics (1968) and world championships (1970) were included in the World Cup season standings; these major competitions were excluded beginning with the 1971 season.

== After racing ==
Russi currently serves as the chairman of the FIS Alpine Committee and is a FIS technical advisor for downhill course design. Beginning with the 1988 Winter Olympics, Russi has been noted as a designer of downhill courses for the Olympics, and he has also designed such courses for the FIS Alpine Skiing World Championships. The Rattlesnake-course at Vail in 1989 was a "formidable challenge" to him. Another famous course of his was the La face de Bellevarde at Val-d’Isère (1992 Winter Olympics), and he was the construction supervisor for the Rosa Khutor course at Krasnaja Poljana (2014 Winter Olympics). This stemmed from dissatisfaction with the courses at the 1980 and 1984 games; since Russi took over, there have been few complaints. He also serves as a commentator for alpine ski racing on Swiss television. He also is a brand ambassador for Japanese car manufacturer Subaru and for several Swiss companies. After the end of his marriage to Michèle Rubi (a three-time Swiss Skiing Champion in 1970), he married Mari Bergström from Sweden. He has a son by his first wife and a daughter by his second.

== World Cup results ==
=== Season titles ===
Season	Discipline
1971	Downhill
1972	Downhill

=== Season standings ===
Season	Age	Overall	Slalom	Giant Slalom	Super G	Downhill	Combined
1970	21	19	—	—	not run	5	awarded only in 1976
1971	22	5	—	8	not run	1	awarded only in 1976
1972	23	5	—	23	not run	1	awarded only in 1976
1973	24	6	—	—	not run	2	awarded only in 1976
1974	25	17	—	—	not run	4	awarded only in 1976
1975	26	11	—	—	not run	4	awarded only in 1976
1976	27	8	—	—	not run	3	—
1977	28	5	—	—	not run	3	
1978	29	28	—	—	not run	12	

=== Race podiums ===
- 10 wins – (9 DH, 1 GS)
- 28 podiums – (27 DH, 1 GS), 52 top tens (50 DH, 2 GS)

Season	Date	Location	Discipline	Place
1970	15 Feb 1970	Val Gardena, Italy – (W.Ch.) ^	Downhill	1st
1971	16 Jan 1971	St. Moritz, Switzerland	Downhill	2nd
1971	31 Jan 1971	Megève, France	Downhill	1st
1971	13 Feb 1971	Mt. Ste. Anne, Canada	Giant slalom	1st
1971	18 Feb 1971	(United States) Sugarloaf, USA	Downhill	1st
1972	5 Dec 1972	St. Moritz, Switzerland	Downhill	1st
1972	14 Jan 1972	Kitzbühel, Austria	Downhill	3rd
1972	(Japan) 1972 Winter Olympics			
1972	25 Feb 1972	(United States) Crystal Mountain, USA	Downhill	1st
1972	26 Feb 1972	(United States) Crystal Mountain, USA	Downhill	2nd
1972	25 Mar 1972	Val Gardena, Italy	Downhill	1st
1973	7 Jan 1973	Garmisch, West Germany	Downhill	3rd
1973	13 Jan 1973	Grindelwald, Switzerland	Downhill	1st
1973	27 Jan 1973	Kitzbühel, Austria	Downhill	2nd
1973	3 Feb 1973	St. Anton, Austria	Downhill	1st
1974	22 Dec 1973	Schladming, Austria	Downhill	3rd
1975	26 Jan 1975	Innsbruck, Austria	Downhill	2nd
1975	21 Mar 1975	Val Gardena, Italy	Downhill	3rd
1976	7 Dec 1975	Val-d'Isère, France	Downhill	3rd
1976	9 Jan 1976	Wengen, Switzerland	Downhill	3rd
1976	17 Jan 1976	Morzine, France	Downhill	2nd
1976	(Austria) 1976 Winter Olympics			
1977	18 Dec 1976	Val Gardena, Italy	Downhill	3rd
1977	15 Jan 1977	Kitzbühel, Austria	Downhill	3rd
1977	22 Jan 1977	Wengen, Switzerland	Downhill	3rd
1977	30 Jan 1977	Morzine, France	Downhill	1st
1977	31 Jan 1977	Morzine, France	Downhill	3rd
1977	18 Feb 1977	Laax, Switzerland	Downhill	3rd
1977	12 Mar 1977	(United States) Heavenly Valley, USA	Downhill	3rd
1978	22 Dec 1977	Cortina d'Ampezzo, Italy	Downhill	2nd

^ Results from the 1970 World Championships (and 1968 Winter Olympics) were included in the World Cup standings.

== World championship results ==
Year	Age	Slalom	Giant Slalom	Super-G	Downhill	Combined
1970	21	—	—	not run	1	—
1972	23	—	—	not run	1	—
1974	25	—	—	not run	13	—
1976	27	—	—	not run	2	—
1978	29	—	—	not run	14	—

From 1948 through 1980, the Winter Olympics were also the World Championships for alpine skiing.

== Olympic results ==
Year	Age	Slalom	Giant Slalom	Super-G	Downhill	Combined
1972	23	—	—	not run	1	not run
1976	27	—	—	not run	2	not run

== Video ==
- Video – 1972 Winter Olympics – men's downhill – gold & bronze medalists – from Japanese television – 1972-02-05 on YouTube

Awards
Preceded by (Switzerland) Philippe Clerc	Swiss Sportsman of the Year; 1970	Succeeded by (Switzerland) Meta Antenen
Preceded by (Switzerland) Meta Antenen	Swiss Sportsman of the Year; 1972	Succeeded by (Switzerland) Werner Dössegger
