= Bachleda =

Bachleda is a Polish surname typical for the Goral population of Zakopane region. It derives from the Rumanian nickname "băchlit", meaning "grumpy". Notable people include:

- Alicja Bachleda-Curuś (born 1983), Polish actress
- Andrzej Bachleda (born 1947), Polish alpine skier
- Andrzej Bachleda (born 1975), Polish alpine skier
- Jan Bachleda (1951–2009), Polish alpine skier
- Katarzyna Bachleda-Curuś (born 1980), Polish speed skater
- Klemens Bachleda (1851–1910), Polish mountain guide and mountain rescuer
- Marcin Bachleda (born 1982), Polish ski jumper
