= Christa Zechmeister =

German alpine skier (born 1957)

Personal information
- Full name: Christa Zechmeister
- Born: 4 December 1957 (age 68) Berchtesgaden, West Germany

Sport
- Sport: Skiing

World Cup career
- Seasons: 8 - (1972-80)
- Indiv. podiums: 14
- Indiv. wins: 7
- Updated on 2013-12-07

Christa Zechmeister (born 4 December 1957 in Berchtesgaden) is a German former alpine skier and the youngest person ever to win a World Cup race, as well as the youngest to stand on the podium. A slalom specialist, she won seven World Cup races, taking the slalom title for the 1973-74 World Cup season.

== World Cup career ==
Zechmeister made her World Cup debut in the 1972-73 season, scoring her first podium finish at Heavenly Valley, California on 22 March 1973 at the age of 15 years, 3 months, 18 days. The following season, she won the opening slalom race, held at Val d'Isere on 8 December 1973 — four days after her 16th birthday. Zechmeister was dominant that season, winning four slalom races en route to the discipline title.

== Major championships ==
Zechmeister competed in two World Championships (1974 and 1978) and one Winter Olympic Games (1976). Her best result was a 7th-place finish in the slalom at Innsbruck in 1976.
