= Annemarie Moser-Pröll =

Austrian alpine skier (born 1953)

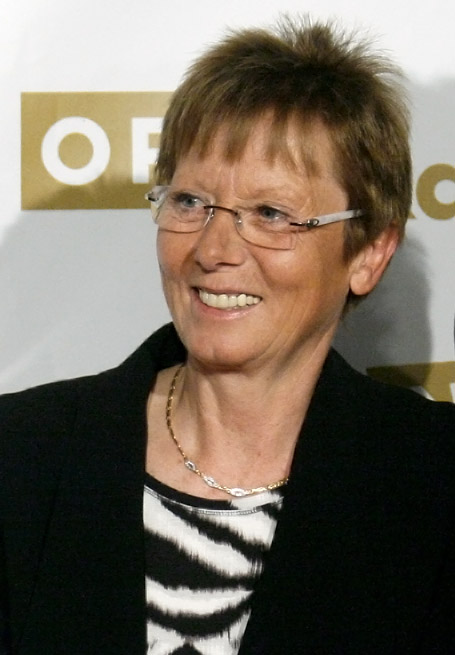
- Moser-Pröll in 2010

Personal information
- Born: 27 March 1953 (age 73) Kleinarl, Salzburg, Austria
- Height: 1.70 m (5 ft 7 in)

Skiing career
- Sport: Alpine skiing
- Club: Schiklub Kleinarl
- Retired: 1980
- Disciplines: Technical events
- World Cup debut: 1969

Olympics
- Teams: 2
- Medals: 3 (1 gold)

World Championships
- Teams: 9
- Medals: 4 (5 gold)

World Cup
- Seasons: 12
- Wins: 62
- Podiums: 113
- Overall titles: 6
- Discipline titles: 12
Medal record
Women's alpine skiing
Representing Austria
World Cup race podiums
Event	1st	2nd	3rd
Slalom	3	7	7
Giant slalom	16	7	8
Downhill	36	14	4
Combined	7	4	1
Total	62	32	20
International competitions
Event	1st	2nd	3rd
Olympic Games	1	2	0
World Championships	5	2	2
Total	6	4	2
Olympic Games
Gold medal – first place	1980 Lake Placid	Downhill
Silver medal – second place	1972 Sapporo	Downhill
Silver medal – second place	1972 Sapporo	Giant slalom
World Championships
Gold medal – first place	1972 Sapporo	Combined
Gold medal – first place	1974 St. Moritz	Downhill
Gold medal – first place	1978 Garmisch	Downhill
Gold medal – first place	1978 Garmisch	Combined
Gold medal – first place	1980 Lake Placid	Downhill
Bronze medal – third place	1970 Val Gardena	Downhill
Bronze medal – third place	1978 Garmisch	Giant slalom

Annemarie Moser-Pröll (born 27 March 1953) is a former World Cup alpine ski racer from Austria. Born in Kleinarl, Salzburg, she was the most successful female alpine ski racer during the 1970s, with an all-time women's record of six overall titles, including five consecutively. She had most success in downhill, giant slalom and combined races. In 1980, her last year as a competitor, she secured her third Olympic medal (and first gold) at Lake Placid and won five World Cup races. Her younger sister Cornelia Pröll is also a former alpine Olympian.

== Career ==
During her career, Moser-Pröll won the overall World Cup title a record six times, including five consecutive (1971–75). She has 62 individual World Cup victories, third behind Mikaela Shiffrin and Lindsey Vonn on the female side. In winning percentage (races won of those entered) her percentage of 35.4% is second only to Mikaela Shiffrin who has won 37.5% of her races. She won five World Championship titles (3 downhill, 2 combined) and one Olympic gold medal. Of all female skiers, she is the one who won most races of a single discipline in a row (11 downhill races: all eight of the 1972–73 World Cup season, plus the first three of the following season).

The way to her first and only Olympic gold medal was quite long: At the 1972 games in Sapporo, Japan, she was considered the clear favourite for downhill and giant slalom, but in both events she finished second behind Marie-Theres Nadig of Switzerland. After winning a fifth consecutive title in overall and downhill, she interrupted her racing career to care for her ailing father, afflicted with lung cancer. She missed the entire 1975–76 World Cup season, including the 1976 Winter Olympics in Innsbruck, in her home country of Austria. After the death of her father in June 1976, she resumed competitive skiing and was immediately among the best, with second place in the overall World Cup standings for two seasons (1977, 1977–78), and won the overall title for the sixth time in 1979. At the 1980 Winter Olympics in Lake Placid, USA, she finished her extraordinary career by winning the downhill gold medal – with her 1972-rival Marie-Theres Nadig again on the podium, as bronze medalist.

== After racing ==
Several weeks after the 1980 Olympics, she retired from competitive skiing and ran her own café, the "Weltcup-Café Annemarie" in Kleinarl, which was decorated with her extensive cup and trophy collection.

She married Herbert Moser in 1974 and their daughter Marion was born in 1982. In December 2003 her first grandchild was born.

Eight months after the death of her husband, she retired from the gastronomy business in 2008 and sold the establishment to local entrepreneurs, who keep running it as "Café-Restaurant Olympia."

== World Cup results ==
=== Season standings ===
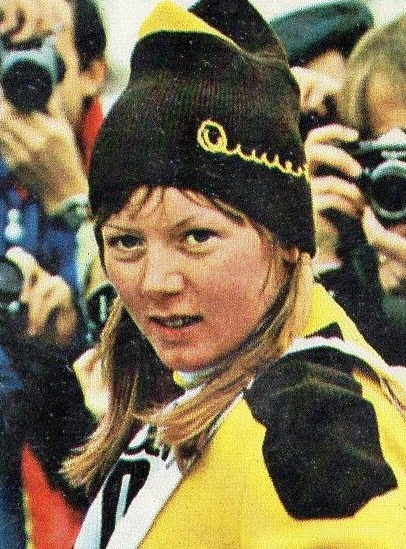
Annemarie Moser-Pröll, c. 1972

Season	Age	Overall	Slalom	Giant slalom	Super G	Downhill	Combined
1969	15	16	15	—	First women's WC SG held in January; 1983	5	Officially awarded in 1976 & 1980 only
1970	16	6	14	3	First women's WC SG held in January; 1983	8	Officially awarded in 1976 & 1980 only
1971	17	1	3	1	First women's WC SG held in January; 1983	1	Officially awarded in 1976 & 1980 only
1972	18	1	9	1	First women's WC SG held in January; 1983	1	Officially awarded in 1976 & 1980 only
1973	19	1	18	2	First women's WC SG held in January; 1983	1	Officially awarded in 1976 & 1980 only
1974	20	1	5	7	First women's WC SG held in January; 1983	1	Officially awarded in 1976 & 1980 only
1975	21	1	4	1	First women's WC SG held in January; 1983	1	Officially awarded in 1976 & 1980 only
1976	22	family leave					
1977	23	2	11	3		2	
1978	24	2	8	5		1	
1979	25	1	2	12		1	
1980	26	2	3	7		2	2

=== Season titles ===
Moser-Pröll won sixteen titles (six overall, seven downhill and three giant slalom).

Season	Discipline
1971	Overall
1971	Downhill
1971	Giant slalom
1972	Overall
1972	Downhill
1972	Giant slalom
1973	Overall
1973	Downhill
1974	Overall
1974	Downhill
1975	Overall
1975	Downhill
1975	Giant slalom
1975	Combined
1978	Downhill
1979	Overall
1979	Downhill
1979	Combined

=== Race victories ===
Moser-Pröll's race wins total 62, comprising 36 downhill, 16 giant slalom, 3 slalom and 7 combined.

Season	Date	Location	Race
1970	17 January 1970	(Socialist Federal Republic of Yugoslavia) Maribor, Yugoslavia	Giant slalom
1971	6 January 1971	(Socialist Federal Republic of Yugoslavia) Maribor, Yugoslavia	Slalom
1971	29 January 1971	St. Gervais, France	Slalom
1971	18 February 1971	(United States) Sugarloaf, ME, USA	Downhill
1971	19 February 1971	(United States) Sugarloaf, ME, USA	Downhill
1971	10 March 1971	Abetone, Italy	Giant slalom
1971	11 March 1971	Abetone, Italy	Giant slalom
1971	14 March 1971	Åre, Sweden	Giant slalom
1972	3 December 1971	St. Moritz, Switzerland	Downhill
1972	17 December 1971	Bardonecchia, Italy	Downhill
1972	12 January 1972	Bad Gastein, Austria	Downhill
1972	18 January 1972	Grindelwald, Switzerland	Downhill
1972	22 January 1972	St. Gervais, France	Giant slalom
1972	19 February 1972	Banff, AB, Canada	Giant slalom
1972	25 February 1972	(United States) Crystal Mtn., WA, USA	Downhill
1972	1 March 1972	(United States) Heavenly Valley, CA, USA	Giant slalom
1973	7 December 1972	Val d'Isère, France	Giant slalom
1973	19 December 1972	Saalbach, Austria	Downhill
1973	20 December 1972	Saalbach, Austria	Giant slalom
1973	9 January 1973	Pfronten, West Germany	Downhill
1973	10 January 1973	Pfronten, West Germany	Downhill
1973	16 January 1973	Grindelwald, Switzerland	Downhill
1973	20 January 1973	St. Gervais, France	Giant slalom
1973	25 January 1973	Chamonix, France	Downhill
1973	2 February 1973	Schruns, Austria	Downhill
1973	10 February 1973	St. Moritz, Switzerland	Downhill
1973	2 March 1973	Mt. St. Anne, QC, Canada	Giant slalom
1974	3 December 1973	Val d'Isere, France	Downhill
1974	19 December 1973	Zell am See, Austria	Downhill
1974	5 January 1974	Pfronten, West Germany	Downhill
1974	23 January 1974	Bad Gastein, Austria	Downhill
1975	7 December 1974	Val d'Isere, France	Downhill
1975	12 December 1974	Cortina d'Ampezzo, Italy	Downhill
1975	15 December 1974	(Socialist Federal Republic of Yugoslavia) Maribor, Yugoslavia	Giant slalom
1975	9 January 1975	Grindelwald, Switzerland	Downhill
1975	10 January 1975	Grindelwald, Switzerland	Giant slalom
1975	10 January 1975	Grindelwald, Switzerland	Combined
1975	11 January 1975	Grindelwald, Switzerland	Giant slalom
1975	16 January 1975	Schruns, Austria	Combined
1975	31 January 1975	St. Gervais, France	Combined
1975	22 February 1975	Naeba, Japan	Giant slalom
1977	15 December 1976	Cortina d'Ampezzo, Italy	Downhill
1977	16 December 1976	Cortina d'Ampezzo, Italy	Combined
1978	6 January 1978	Pfronten, West Germany	Downhill
1978	7 January 1978	Pfronten, West Germany	Downhill
1978	9 January 1978	Garmisch, West Germany	Downhill
1978	13 January 1978	Les Diablerets, Switzerland	Downhill
1978	11 March 1978	Bad Gastein, Austria	Downhill
1978	12 March 1978	Bad Kleinkirchheim, Austria	Downhill
1978	17 March 1978	Arosa, Switzerland	Giant slalom
1979	9 December 1978	Piancavallo, Italy	Downhill
1979	17 December 1978	Val d'Isere, France	Downhill
1979	12 January 1979	Les Diablerets, Switzerland	Downhill
1979	17 January 1979	Meiringen, Switzerland	Downhill
1979	19 January 1979	Meiringen, Switzerland	Combined
1979	26 January 1979	Schruns, Austria	Downhill
1979	4 February 1979	Pfronten, West Germany	Combined
1979	2 March 1979	(United States) Lake Placid, NY, USA	Downhill
1980	14 December 1979	Piancavallo, Italy	Combined
1980	15 December 1979	Piancavallo, Italy	Slalom
1980	6 January 1980	Pfronten, West Germany	Downhill

Awards
Preceded by Trixi Schuba	Austrian Sportswoman of the year 1973–1975	Succeeded by Brigitte Habersatter
Preceded by Brigitte Habersatter	Austrian Sportswoman of the year 1977–1980	Succeeded by Claudia Kristofics-Binder
