= Marcello Varallo =

Italian alpine skier (born 1947)

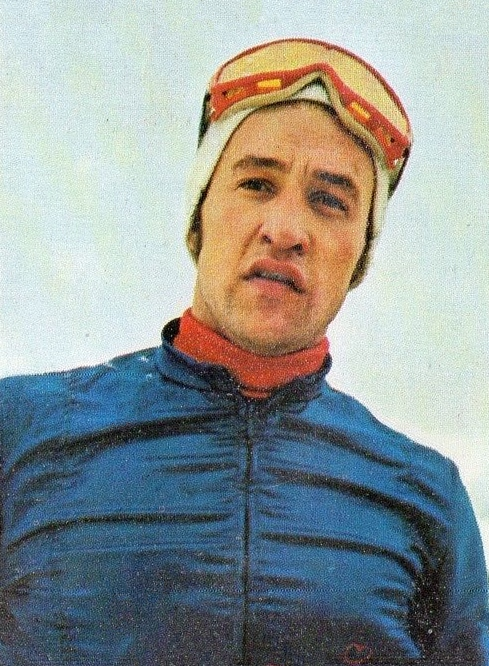

Personal information
- Born: 8 October 1947 (age 78) Milan, Italy
- Height: 174 cm (5 ft 9 in)
- Weight: 69 kg (152 lb)

Sport
- Sport: Alpine skiing
- Club: G.S. Fiamme Gialle, Rome

Marcello Varallo (born 8 October 1947) is a retired Italian alpine skier. He placed 10th in the downhill at the 1972 Winter Olympics and finished third in the 1973 Alpine Ski World Cup in this discipline.
