= Claudine Emonet =

French alpine skier (born 1962)

Claudine Emonet (born 13 February 1962 in Sallanches) is a French former alpine skier who competed in the 1988 Winter Olympics. She is the sister of Olympian Patricia Emonet.
