= René Berthod =

Swiss alpine skier (born 1948)

René Berthod (born 7 February 1948 in Château-d'Œx) is a Swiss retired alpine skier who competed in the 1976 Winter Olympics, finishing 12th in the men's downhill. In 1978, after various injuries, Berthod announced his retirement from active ski racing.
