= Johann Kniewasser =

Austrian alpine skier (1951–2012)

Johann "Hans" Kniewasser (13 October 1951 – 19 October 2012) was an Austrian alpine skier.
