= Tino Pietrogiovanna =

French alpine skier (born 1950)

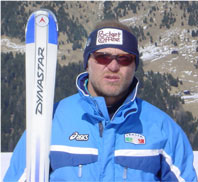

Personal information
- Born: 19 December 1950 (age 75) Santa Caterina di Valfurva, Italy

Skiing career
- Sport: Alpine skiing
- Retired: 1975
- World Cup debut: 1973

World Cup
- Seasons: 3
- Podiums: 2

Tino Pietrogiovanna (born 19 December 1950) is a retired Italian alpine skier and alpine ski coach.

== Biography ==
After his skiing career he began his career as a coach.

== See also ==
- Valanga azzurra
