= Patricia Emonet =

French alpine skier (born 1956)

Patricia Emonet (born 23 July 1956 in Sallanches) is a French former alpine skier who competed in the 1976 Winter Olympics. She is the sister of Olympian Claudine Emonet.
