= Bernadette Zurbriggen =

Swiss alpine skier

Personal information
- Born: 30 August 1956 (age 69) Saas-Grund, Switzerland

Skiing career
- Sport: Alpine skiing
- Retired: 1980
- Disciplines: Speed events
- World Cup debut: 1973

Olympics
- Teams: 3

World Championships
- Teams: 2

World Cup
- Seasons: 8
- Wins: 7
- Podiums: 18
Medal record
Women's alpine skiing
Representing Switzerland
World Cup race podiums
Event	1st	2nd	3rd
Giant slalom	1	1	2
Downhill	5	3	4
Combined	1	0	1
Total	7	4	7

Bernadette Zurbriggen (born 30 August 1956) is a former Swiss alpine skier.

== Career ==
During her career she has achieved 18 results among the top 3 in the World Cup. In the 1970s, Zurbriggen won seven World Cup races: five in Downhill, one in Giant slalom and one in Alpine Combined. She competed at three Winter Olympics between 1972 and 1980, with a seventh position in the women's Downhill in both 1972 and 1976 her best finish.

== World Cup results ==
Victories

Date	Place	Discipline	Rank
18-01-1977	(Austria) Schruns	Downhill	1
22-01-1976	(Austria) Bad Gastein	Combined	1
08-01-1976	(Switzerland) Meiringen	Downhill	1
03-12-1975	(France) Val d'Isere	Downhill	1
31-01-1975	(France) Chamonix	Downhill	1
15-01-1975	(Austria) Schruns	Downhill	1
07-03-1973	(United States) Anchorage	Giant slalom	1
