= Fabienne Serrat =

French alpine skier

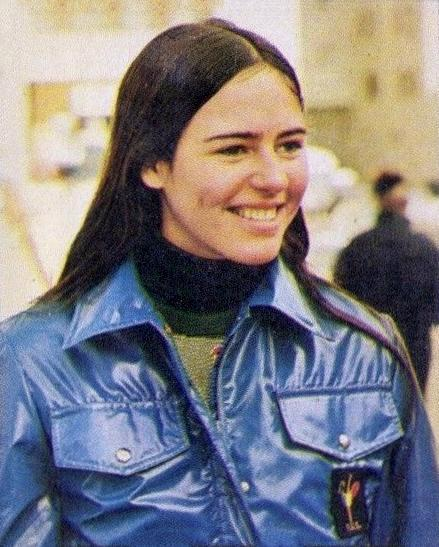

Personal information
- Born: 5 July 1956 (age 70) Le Bourg-d'Oisans, France
- Height: 170 cm (5 ft 7 in)

Skiing career
- Sport: Alpine skiing
- Club: Dauphine; L'Alpe d'Huez
- Retired: March 1984
- Disciplines: Downhill, super-G, giant slalom, slalom, combined
- World Cup debut: 20 December, 1972 (age 16)

Olympics
- Teams: 3

World Championships
- Teams: 5 includes two Olympics
- Medals: 3 (2 gold)

World Cup
- Seasons: 12
- Wins: 3
- Podiums: 37
Medal record
Women's alpine skiing
Representing France
World Cup race podiums
Event	1st	2nd	3rd
Slalom	2	10	5
Giant slalom	1	4	11
Combined	0	2	2
Parallel	0	0	1
Total	3	16	19
World Championships
Gold medal – first place	1974 St. Moritz	Giant slalom
Gold medal – first place	1974 St. Moritz	Combined
Bronze medal – third place	1978 Garmisch	Combined

Fabienne Serrat (born 5 July 1956) is a former world champion alpine ski racer. At age 17, Serrat won two gold medals at the 1974 World Championships in St. Moritz, Switzerland, in the giant slalom and the combined events. During her World Cup career she had three victories, 37 podiums, and 124 top ten finishes.

== Career ==
Serrat competed at the 1976, 1980 and 1984 Winter Olympics in a total of five events. Her best result was fourth place in the giant slalom in 1980. She retired from competition in 1984 at age 27 and married Swiss ski racer Peter Lüscher, the 1979 World Cup overall champion.

== Europa Cup results ==
Serrat has won an overall Europa Cup and one specialty standings.

- FIS Alpine Ski Europa Cup
  - Overall: 1972
  - Slalom: 1972
