= Helmuth Schmalzl =

Italian alpine skier (born 1948)

Personal information
- Born: 8 October 1948 (age 78) Urtijëi, Italy

Skiing career
- Sport: Alpine skiing
- Disciplines: Polyvalent

Helmuth Schmalzl (born 8 October 1948) is an Italian former alpine skier who competed in the 1972 Winter Olympics.
