= Jan Bachleda =

Polish alpine skier (1951–2009)

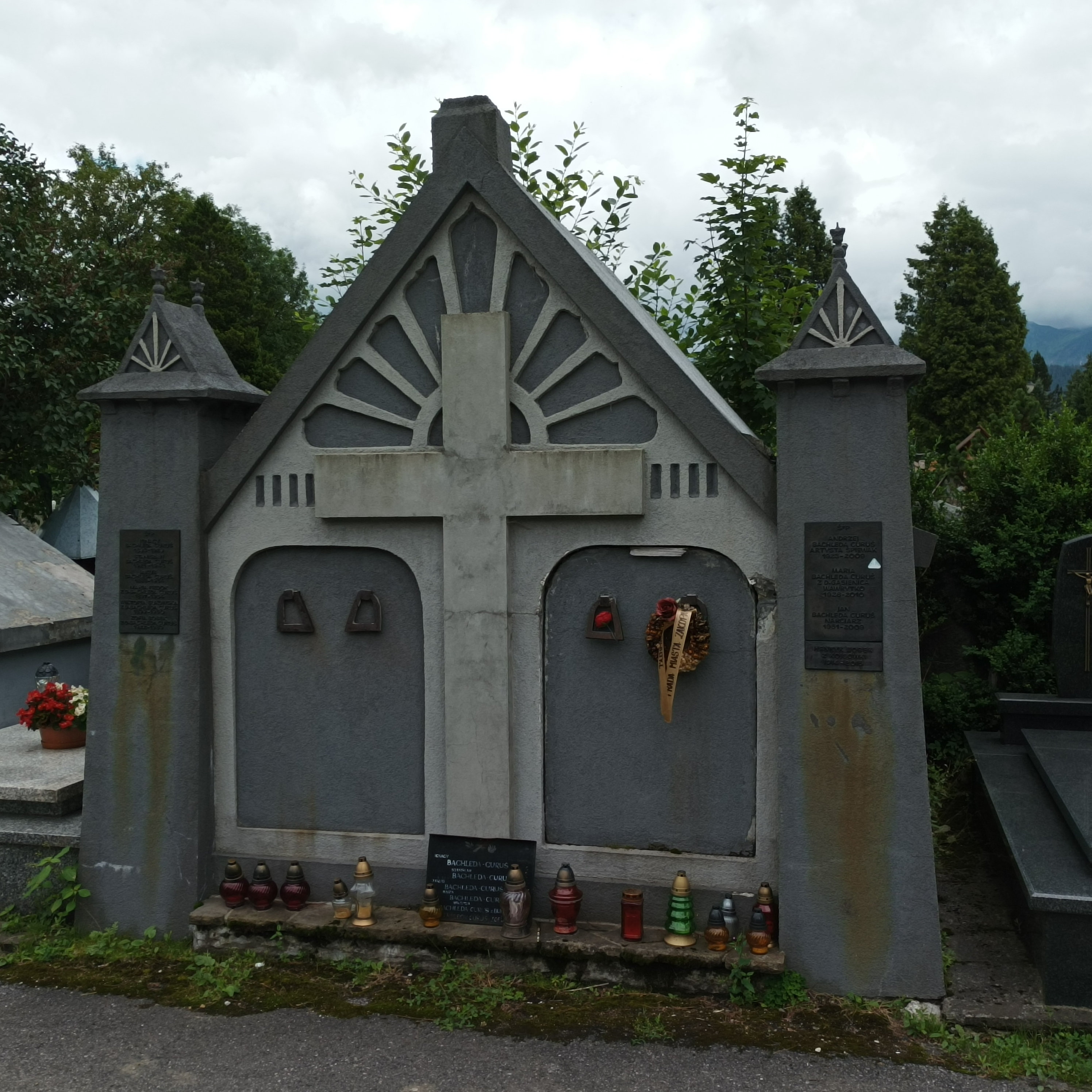
The grave of Andrzej and Jan Bachleda-Curuś at the New Cemetery in Zakopane

Jan Wojciech Bachleda-Curuś (19 April 1951 in Zakopane – 7 February 2009 in Zakopane) was a Polish alpine skier who competed in the 1976 Winter Olympics.
