= Fausto Radici =

Italian alpine skier (1953–2002)

Personal information
- Born: 24 September 1953 Leffe, Italy
- Died: 13 April 2002 (aged 48) Peia, Italy

Skiing career
- Sport: Alpine skiing
- Retired: 1977
- Disciplines: Slalom
- World Cup debut: 1973

Olympics
- Teams: 1

World Championships
- Teams: 1

World Cup
- Seasons: 5

Fausto Radici (24 September 1953 – 14 April 2002) was an Italian alpine skier who competed in the 1976 Winter Olympics. He was a prominent member of the Italy national alpine ski team when it was known as the "Blue Avalanche" in the 1970s.

== Racing ==
He finished 7th in the slalom race at the 1976 Winter Olympics. He was an Italian Champion in slalom in 1974. In the World Cup he won two slalom races: 5 January 1976 at Garmisch-Partenkirchen, and 19 December 1976, at Madonna di Campiglio.

== Personal life ==
He was married to alpine ski racer Elena Matous.

He died on 14 April 2002 in Peia at the age of 49. The manner of death was suicide.
