= Hansi Hinterseer =

Austrian singer (born 1954)

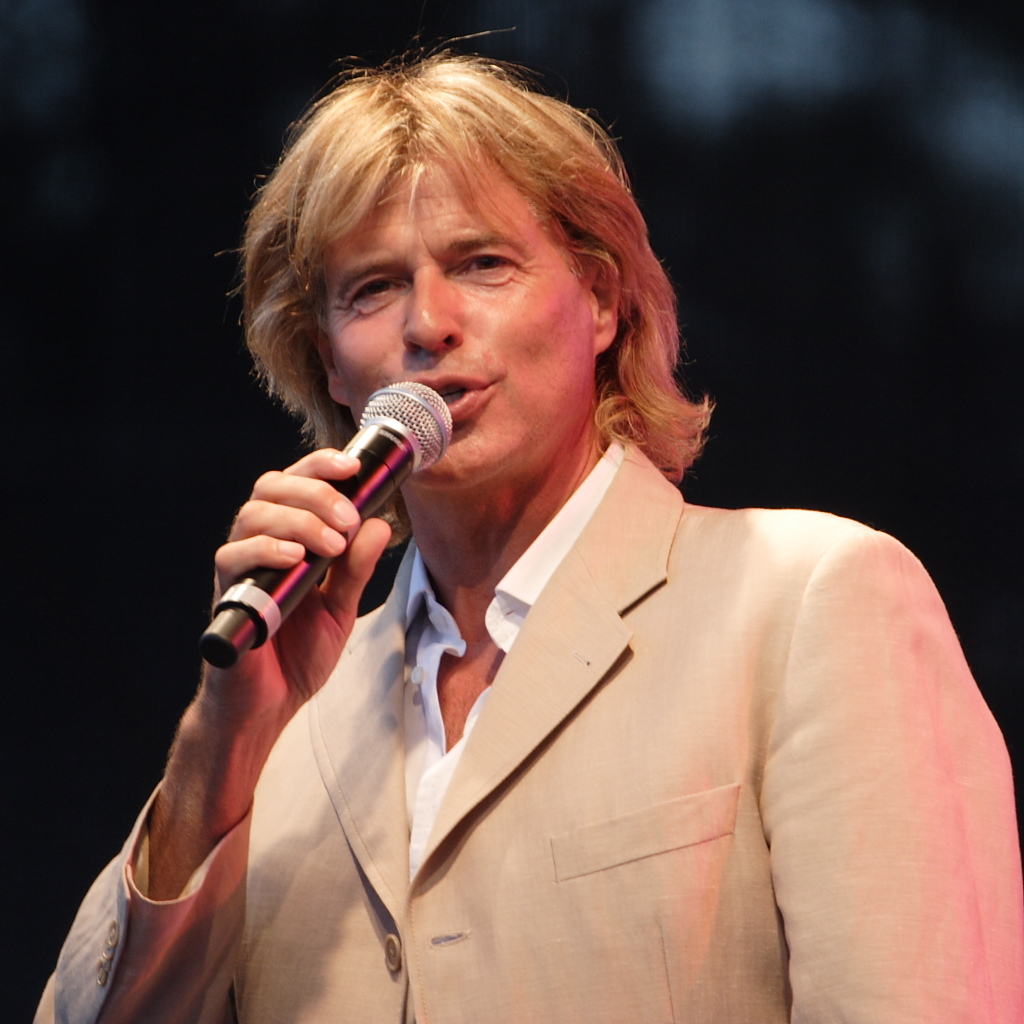
- Hinterseer in 2006

Background information
- Born: 2 February 1954 (age 72); Kitzbühel, Austria
- Genres: Pop, schlager
- Occupations: Singer, actor, television personality
- Years active: 1994–present
- Website: hansi-hinterseer.at

Johann Ernst "Hansi" Hinterseer (born 2 February 1954) is an Austrian schlager singer, actor, entertainer and former alpine skier.

== Sports ==
Hansi Hinterseer
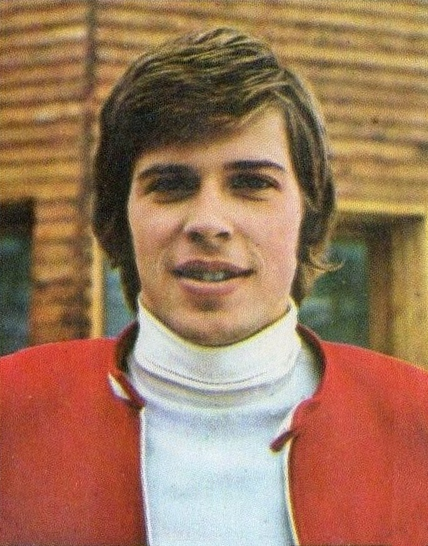
- Hinterseer c. 1974

Personal information
- Born: 2 February 1954 (age 72) Kitzbühel, Austria
- Height: 173 cm (5 ft 8 in)
- Weight: 68 kg (150 lb)

Sport
- Sport: Alpine skiing
- Club: Kitzbüheler Ski Club
Medal record
Men's alpine skiing
Representing Austria
World Cup race podiums
Event	1st	2nd	3rd
Slalom	3	1	2
Giant slalom	3	6	8
Total	6	7	10
World Championships
Silver medal – second place	1974 St. Moritz	Giant slalom

Hinterseer is the son of Ernst Hinterseer, who won a gold medal in slalom skiing at the 1960 Winter Olympics. Hans Hinterseer also became a member of the Austrian ski team. He won six alpine skiing World Cup races in the slalom and giant slalom, and the overall giant slalom contest at the 1973 Alpine Skiing World Cup. He also won the silver medal at the world championship in 1974, and participated at the 1976 Winter Olympics in Innsbruck.

Since the early 1980s, he has been a technical sports commentator for the National Austrian Broadcasting Corporation, usually commenting on slalom and giant slalom live broadcasts.

Individual races

Date	Location	Race
8 March 1973	(United States) Anchorage	Giant slalom
8 December 1973	(France) Val-d'Isère	Giant slalom
27 January 1974	(Austria) Kitzbühel	Slalom
23 February 1975	(Japan) Naeba	Slalom
21 December 1975	(Austria) Schladming	Slalom
25 February 1977	(Japan) Furano	Giant slalom

== Music and acting ==
In 1994, Hinterseer started a career as a singer, and is currently prominent as a performer in the schlager genre. He has also acted in several films, also following a Heimatfilm theme.

=== Discography ===
Charting albums

Year	Album	Peak position	Certifications	Notes
Year	Album	DEN	Certifications	Notes
2010	The Danish Collection	1		
2010	Ich hab dich einfach lieb	1		
2010	Glædelig Jul	14		
2010	Das Beste von Hansi Hinterseer	16		
2011	Zwei Herzen	2		
2012	Im siebten Himmel	3		
2012	Jedes Jahr zur selben Zeit	14		
2013	Heut ist dein tag	2		
2013	De største hits	6		
2014	Das beste zum Jubiläum Live	14		
2015	Gefühle	10		
2017	Für mich ist Glück...	39		
2019	Ich halt zu dir	11		
2020	Weihnachten miteinander	21		
2022	Weil es dich gibt	35		

Charting singles

Year	Single	Peak position	Certifications	Album
Year	Single	GER	Certifications	Album
2010	"Hände zum Himmel"	68		

Others

- Wenn man sich lieb hat ("If you are in love")
- Ich warte auf dich ("I am waiting for you")
- Mein Geschenk für dich ("My present for you")
- Danke für deine Liebe ("Thank you for your love")
- Dann nehm ich dich in meine Arme ("Then I take you in my arms")
- Träum mit mir ("Dream with me")
- Du bist alles ("You are everything")
- Weihnachten mit Hansi ("Christmas with Hansi")
- Vater, dein Wille geschehe ("Father, thy will be done")
- Meine Lieder, deine Träume ("My songs, your dreams")
- Goldene Weihnacht ("Golden Christmas")
- Komm mit mir ("Come with Me") (2009, Ariola)

=== DVDs ===
- 2010: Ich hab dich einfach lieb! Kitzbühel Open Air 2010

=== TV / Filmography ===
- 1997: "Hochwürdens Ärger mit dem Paradies" (TV film comedy)
- 2000: "Da wo die Berge sind"
- 2002: "Da wo die Liebe wohnt"
- 2003: "Da wo die Heimat ist"
- 2004: "Da wo die Herzen schlagen"
- 2005: "Da wo das Glück wartet"

== See also ==
- List of Austrians in music
