= Erwin Stricker =

Italian alpine skier

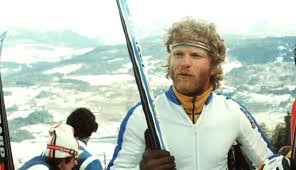

Personal information
- Born: 15 August 1950 Mattighofen, Austria
- Died: 25 September 2010 (aged 60) Bozen, Italy
- Height: 1.72 m (5 ft 8 in)

Skiing career
- Sport: Alpine skiing
- Club: C.S. Carabinieri
- Retired: 1976
- Disciplines: Speed events
- World Cup debut: 1972

Olympics
- Teams: 2 (1972, 1976)

World Championships
- Teams: 3 (1972, 1974, 1976)

World Cup
- Seasons: 4

Erwin Stricker (15 August 1950 – 28 September 2010) was an Italian alpine skier who competed in the 1972 Winter Olympics and 1976 Winter Olympics.

Nicknamed Cavallo pazzo (in English Crazy horse) for his exuberant style, Stricker was the first skier after Karl Schranz and Jean-Claude Killy to enter the first group of merit of all the specialties foreseen at his time (downhill, giant slalom and special slalom).

== Biography ==
Although born in Austria, Stricker’s family was originally from Brixen, where he lived most of his life.

== World Cup results ==
Podium

Date	Place	Discipline	Position
07-01-1974	(Germany) Berchtesgaden	Giant Slalom	3
24-03-1973	(United States) Heavenly Valley	Giant Slalom	2
