= Monika Kaserer =

Austrian alpine skier

Personal information
- Born: 11 May 1952 (age 74) Neukirchen am Grossvenediger, Austria

Skiing career
- Sport: Alpine skiing
- Retired: 1980
- Disciplines: Technical events
- World Cup debut: 1973

Olympics
- Teams: 2

World Championships
- Teams: 2
- Medals: 2

World Cup
- Seasons: 8
- Wins: 10
- Podiums: 42
- Discipline titles: 1
Medal record
Women's alpine skiing
Representing Austria
World Cup race podiums
Event	1st	2nd	3rd
Slalom	1	3	6
Giant slalom	8	12	8
Downhill	0	1	0
Super-G	—	—	—
Combined	0	1	1
Parallel	1	0	0
Total	10	17	15
World Championships
Bronze medal – third place	1974 St. Moritz	Combined
Bronze medal – third place	1978 Garmisch	Slalom

Monika Kaserer (born 11 May 1952) is a former Austrian alpine skier.

== World Cup results ==
- 8 World Cup race victories at Giant slalom
- 2 World Cup victories at Slalom
- Giant slalom World Cup winner 1972/73

== Olympics results ==
1976 Winter Olympics in Innsbruck:

- ninth place at alpine skiing Downhill
- sixth place at alpine skiing Giant slalom

1972 Winter Olympics in Sapporo:

- seventh at alpine skiing Slalom

== World Championships results ==
Alpine skiing World Championship 1974 in St. Moritz:

- fifth place at Giant slalom
- fourth place at Downhill
- seventh at Slalom
- Bronze at Combined

Alpine skiing World Championship 1978 in Garmisch-Partenkirchen:

- Bronze at Slalom
