= Irmgard Lukasser =

Austrian alpine skier (born 1954)

Irmgard Lukasser (born 3 February 1954 in Assling) is an Austrian former alpine skier who competed in the 1976 Winter Olympics.

After several Tyrolean and Austrian youth championships in both downhill and giant slalom events, Lukasser took part in the Ski World Cup for the first time in December 1972; at Val d'Isere, she finished in third place. In January 1973 she achieved two more medals in Pfronten. With several top 10 finishes, she qualified for the 1974 World Cup in St. Moritz.

After two more podium finishes in January 1976 she went into the Olympic Winter Games 1976 in Innsbruck as favourite, but finished in twelfth pace.

In 1977, she missed out on the World Cup due to injury. At the 1978 World Cup in Garmisch-Partenkirchen, she finished ninth. In February 1979 she announced her retirement from elite sport.

She is married to the former football player Norbert Ebster and has three children.
