= Philippe Roux =

Swiss alpine skier and rally driver (born 1952)

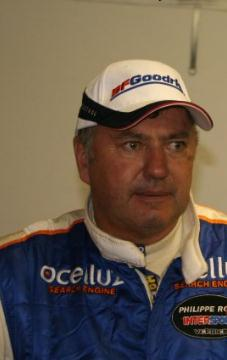

Personal information
- Nationality: (Switzerland) Swiss
- Born: 7 December 1952 (age 73); Verbier, Switzerland

World Rally Championship record
- Years active: 1982–1983, 1990, 2003–2004, 2006–2008, 2021
- Co-driver: (Switzerland) Ugo Rattazzi (Switzerland) Michel Wyder (Switzerland) Paul Corthay (Switzerland) Eric Jordan (Switzerland) Christophe Roux
- Teams: Bozian Racing
- Rallies: 10
- Championships: 0
- Rally wins: 0
- Podiums: 0
- Stage wins: 0
- Total points: 0
- First rally: 1982 Monte Carlo Rally
- Last rally: 2021 Monte Carlo Rally

Philippe Roux (born 7 December 1952) is a Swiss former rally driver and former alpine skier who competed in the 1976 Winter Olympics. He competed in multiple editions of Rallye Monte-Carlo, with the best result of 16th place and Rallye du Valais - which he won three times, in 1978, 1988 and 1992, along with eight more podiums.

== Racing record ==
=== Complete WRC results ===
| Year | Entrant | Car | 1 | 2 | 3 | 4 | 5 | 6 | 7 | 8 | 9 | 10 | 11 | 12 | 13 | 14 | 15 | 16 | WDC | Points |
|---|---|---|---|---|---|---|---|---|---|---|---|---|---|---|---|---|---|---|---|---|
| 1982 | Philippe Roux | Datsun Violet 160J | MON; 31 | SWE | POR | KEN | FRA | GRC | NZL | BRA | FIN | ITA | CIV | GBR | | | | | NC | 0 |
| 1983 | Philippe Roux | Porsche 935 Turbo | MON; DSQ | SWE | POR | KEN | FRA | GRC | NZL | ARG | FIN | ITA | CIV | GBR | | | | | NC | 0 |
| 1990 | Philippe Roux | Lancia Delta Integrale 16V | MON; Ret | POR | KEN | FRA | GRC | NZL | ARG | FIN | AUS | ITA | CIV | GBR | | | | | NC | 0 |
| 2003 | Philippe Roux | Ford Focus RS WRC 01 | MON; 16 | SWE | TUR | NZL | ARG | GRC | CYP | GER | FIN | AUS | ITA | FRA | ESP | GBR | | | NC | 0 |
| 2004 | Philippe Roux | Ford Focus RS WRC 02 | MON; Ret | SWE | MEX | NZL | CYP | GRE | TUR | ARG | FIN | GER | JPN | GBR | ITA | FRA | ESP | AUS | NC | 0 |
| 2006 | Philippe Roux | Peugeot 206 WRC | MON; 19 | SWE | MEX | ESP | | | | | | | | | | | | | NC | 0 |
| 2006 | OMV Peugeot Norway World Rally Team | Peugeot 206 WRC | | | | | FRA; 29 | ARG | ITA | GRE | GER | FIN | JPN | CYP | TUR | AUS | NZL | GBR | NC | 0 |
| 2007 | Bozian Racing | Peugeot 307 WRC | MON; 16 | SWE | NOR | MEX | POR | ARG | ITA | GRE | FIN | GER | NZL | ESP | FRA | JPN | IRE | GBR | NC | 0 |
| 2008 | Team Roux-Spiers | Subaru Impreza STi N12 | MON; Ret | SWE | MEX | ARG | JOR | ITA | GRE | TUR | FIN | GER | NZL | ESP | FRA | JPN | GBR | | NC | 0 |
| 2021 | Philippe Roux | Volkswagen Polo GTI R5 | MON; 46 | ARC | CRO | POR | ITA | KEN | EST | BEL | GRE | FIN | ESP | MNZ | | | | | NC | 0 |
