= FIS Alpine World Ski Championships 1974 =

Skiing event in St. Moritz, Switzerland

Coordinates: 46.506°N 9.787°E

- Host city: Saint Moritz
- Country: Switzerland
- Events: 8
- Opening: 3 February 1974
- Closing: 10 February 1974
- Opened by: Franz Jonas

Location in the Alps of Europe
Location in Switzerland

The FIS Alpine World Ski Championships 1974 were held in St. Moritz, Switzerland, at Piz Nair from February 3 to February 10, 1974.

St. Moritz hosted again in 2003, and the event is scheduled to return in 2017. It also hosted the Winter Olympics in 1948 and 1928 (no alpine skiing).

== Men's competitions ==
=== Downhill ===
Saturday, 9 February

| Place | Athlete | Nation | Time |
|---|---|---|---|
| 1 | David Zwilling | Austria (AUT) | 1:56.98 |
| 2 | Franz Klammer | Austria (AUT) | 1:58.01 |
| 3 | Willi Frommelt | Liechtenstein (LIE) | 1:58.16 |

=== Giant slalom ===
Tuesday, 5 February

| Place | Athlete | Nation | Time | 1st run | 2nd run |
|---|---|---|---|---|---|
| 1 | Gustav Thöni | Italy (ITA) | 3:07.92 | 1:36.71 | 1:31.21 |
| 2 | Hansi Hinterseer | Austria (AUT) | 3:08.84 | 1:38.47 | 1:30.37 |
| 3 | Piero Gros | Italy (ITA) | 3:08.91 | 1:37.85 | 1:31.06 |

=== Slalom ===
Sunday, 10 February

| Place | Athlete | Nation | Time | 1st run | 2nd run |
|---|---|---|---|---|---|
| 1 | Gustav Thöni | Italy (ITA) | 1:49.98 | 58.91 | 51.07 |
| 2 | David Zwilling | Austria (AUT) | 1:50.76 | 57.51 | 53.25 |
| 3 | Francisco Fernández-Ochoa | Spain (ESP) | 1:51.56 | 58.12 | 53.44 |

=== Combined ===
| Place | Athlete | Nation | Points |
|---|---|---|---|
| 1 | Franz Klammer | Austria (AUT) | 67.88 |
| 2 | Andrzej Bachleda | Poland (POL) | 78.35 |
| 3 | Wolfgang Junginger | West Germany (FRG) | 89.01 |

At the World Championships from 1954 through 1980, the combined was a "paper race" using the results of the three events (DH, GS, SL).

== Women's competitions ==
=== Downhill ===
Thursday, 7 February

| Place | Athlete | Nation | Time |
|---|---|---|---|
| 1 | Annemarie Pröll | Austria (AUT) | 1:50.84 |
| 2 | Betsy Clifford | Canada (CAN) | 1:51.78 |
| 3 | Wiltrud Drexel | Austria (AUT) | 1:52.15 |

=== Giant slalom ===
Sunday, 3 February

| Place | Athlete | Nation | Time |
|---|---|---|---|
| 1 | Fabienne Serrat | France (FRA) | 1:43.18 |
| 2 | Traudl Treichl | West Germany (FRG) | 1:43.72 |
| 3 | Jacqueline Rouvier | France (FRA) | 1.43.81 |

=== Slalom ===
Friday, 8 February

| Place | Athlete | Nation | Time | 1st run | 2nd run |
|---|---|---|---|---|---|
| 1 | Hanni Wenzel | Liechtenstein (LIE) | 1:34.63 | 48.81 | 45.82 |
| 2 | Michèle Jacot | France (FRA) | 1:35.15 | 48.79 | 46.36 |
| 3 | Lise-Marie Morerod | Switzerland (SUI) | 1:35.29 | 49.45 | 45.84 |

=== Combined ===
| Place | Athlete | Nation | Points |
|---|---|---|---|
| 1 | Fabienne Serrat | France (FRA) | 20.14 |
| 2 | Hanni Wenzel | Liechtenstein (LIE) | 25.31 |
| 3 | Monika Kaserer | Austria (AUT) | 27.44 |

At the World Championships from 1954 through 1980, the combined was a "paper race" using the results of the three events (DH, GS, SL).

== Medals table ==
| Place | Nation | Gold | Silver | Bronze | Total |
|---|---|---|---|---|---|
| 1 | Austria (AUT) | 3 | 3 | 2 | 8 |
| 2 | France (FRA) | 2 | 1 | 1 | 4 |
| 3 | Italy (ITA) | 2 | – | 1 | 3 |
| 4 | Liechtenstein | 1 | 1 | 1 | 3 |
| 5 | West Germany (FRG) | – | 1 | 1 | 2 |
| 6 | Canada (CAN) | – | 1 | – | 1 |
| | Poland (POL) | – | 1 | – | 1 |
| 8 | Switzerland (SUI) | – | – | 1 | 1 |
| | Spain | – | – | 1 | 1 |

== See also ==
- Italy at the FIS Alpine World Ski Championships 1974
