= David Zwilling =

Austrian alpine skier (born 1949)

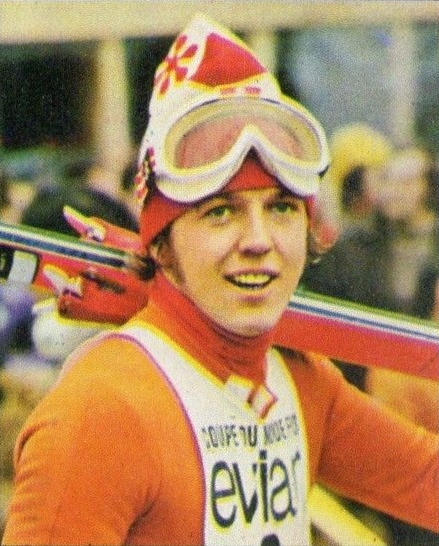

Personal information
- Born: 24 August 1949 (age 76) Abtenau, Austria
- Height: 1.74 m (5 ft 9 in)
- Weight: 68 kg (150 lb)

Sport
- Sport: Alpine skiing
- Club: Union Abtenau
Medal record
Representing Austria
World championship
Gold medal – first place	1974 St. Moritz	Downhill
Silver medal – second place	1974 St. Moritz	Slalom

David Zwilling (born 24 August 1949) is an Austrian former alpine skier and world champion. He won a gold medal in the downhill at the FIS Alpine World Ski Championships 1974 and finished second in the overall 1973 Alpine Skiing World Cup. He competed in the slalom and giant slalom at the 1972 Olympics and finished seventh in both events.

Zwilling was elected Austrian Sportspersonality of the year 1974.
