= Jacqueline Rouvier =

French alpine skier (born 1949)

Personal information
- Born: 26 November 1949 (age 76) Notre-Dame-de-Bellecombe, France

Skiing career
- Sport: Alpine skiing
- Retired: March 1980
- Disciplines: Giant slalom, slalom, Downhill, combined
- World Cup debut: 1967

Olympics
- Teams: 1

World Championships
- Teams: 1
- Medals: 1

World Cup
- Wins: 1
- Podiums: 12
Medal record
Women's alpine skiing
Representing France
World Championships
Bronze medal – third place	1974 St. Moritz	Giant slalom

Jacqueline Rouvier (born 26 October 1949 in Notre-Dame-de-Bellecombe) is a French alpine ski racer.
