= Ingrid Gfölner =

Austrian alpine skier (born 1952)

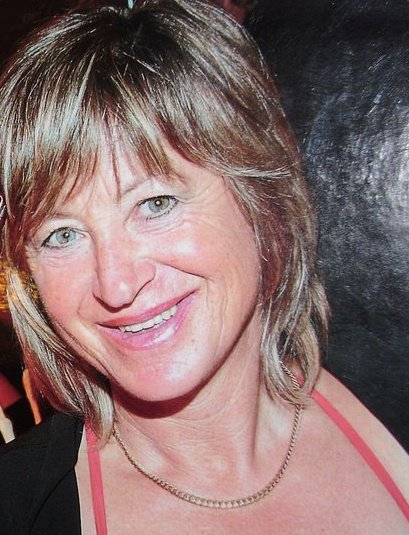
Ingrid Gfölner

Ingrid Schmid-Gfölner (born 13 September 1952) is an Austrian former alpine skier.
