= Erik Håker =

Norwegian alpine skier (born 1952)

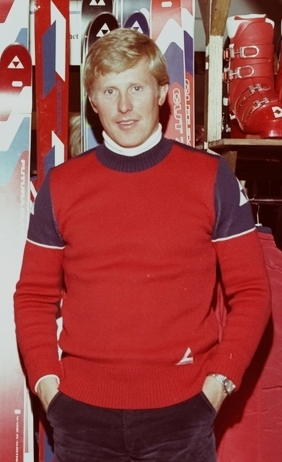
- Håker in 1977

Personal information
- Born: 4 March 1952 (age 74) Oppdal Municipality, Norway
- Height: 180 cm (5 ft 11 in)
- Weight: 77 kg (170 lb)

Sport
- Sport: Alpine skiing
- Club: Oppdal IL

Erik Håker (born 4 March 1952) was the first Norwegian alpine skier to win a World Cup event. He has done that in 1971, and won four more events in 1972–1978. In 1979 he was awarded the Holmenkollen medal. Håker competed at the 1972, 1976 and 1980 Winter Olympics with the best result of fifth place in the downhill in 1972.

== FIS Alpine Ski World Cup victories ==
Data	Place	Discipline
9 December 1971	(France) Val d'Isere	Giant slalom
18 February 1972	(Canada) Banff	Giant slalom
12 March 1973	(Japan) Naeba	Giant slalom
21 January 1975	(Austria) Fulpmes	Giant slalom
17 December 1978	(Italy) Val Gardena	Downhill
