= Traudl Treichl =

German alpine skier (born 1950)

Traudl Treichl (born 12 March 1950, in Lenggries) is a German retired alpine skier who competed in the 1972 Winter Olympics.
