= Mount Mansfield Union High School =

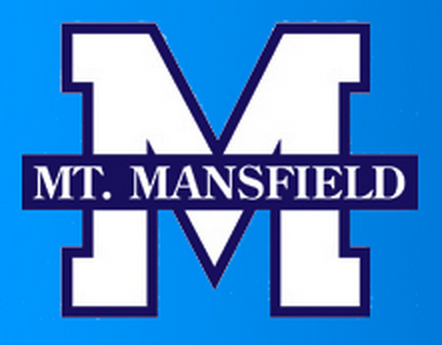

Location
- 211 Browns Trace; Jericho, Vermont; United States; 44°29′10″N 72°57′43″W

Information
- Type: Public, preparatory
- Established: 1967
- School district: Mount Mansfield Unified Union School District
- Superintendent: John Muldoon
- CEEB code: 460205
- Principal: Michael Weston
- Teaching staff: 52.65 (FTE)
- Grades: 9 to 12
- Enrollment: 702 (2023-2024)
- Student to teacher ratio: 13.33
- Colors: Cougar Blue, Cardinal Blue, and White
- Mascot: Cougar
- Nickname: MMU
- Team name: Cougars
- Website: https://mmu.mmuusd.org/

Mount Mansfield Union High School (MMU) is a high school located near the center of Jericho, Vermont. It is accredited by the New England Association of Secondary Schools and Colleges and by the Vermont Department of Education.

Mount Mansfield Union High School is part of the Mount Mansfield Modified Union School District, and serves students from Jericho, Underhill, Richmond, Huntington, and Bolton.

U.S. News ranked MMU as the best high school in Vermont, both public and private. In April 2017 it was ranked as the third best high school in Vermont and at number 893 in the nation. MMU has also been cited by BusinessWeek as being the "best high school in Vermont" and "among the best in New England", based on academic performance and standardized test scores.

== Curriculum ==
Language is not required for graduation from MMU, but since most students go to college or some other form of higher education, it is common to take at least two years of a foreign language. MMU offers Spanish and French. Although only these are offered on campus, students may obtain credits through online courses or other local campuses, including that of the University of Vermont. Students also have the option of attending Essex Technical Center or Burlington Technical Center.

Math levels at MMU are slightly different from usual. The levels start with Math 1 which contains geometry and algebra. The student their freshman year can choose from Math 1, Math 1 Honors, and Algebra Prep. If a student chooses to take Algebra Prep they must complete Math 1 the next year. Then the student progresses to Math 2, if doing honors Math 2 Honors is an option. Then the student moves onto either Math 3 or Math 3 Honors. After this the student moves on to Math 4, and if having been doing honors AP Calculus. Along with this the school offers AP Statistics and Statistics.

The school uses a 4.33 GPA scale.

== Sports offered ==
- Football - State Champions 2018
- Baseball - State Champions 1980, 1995, 1998, 2000
- Boys' Basketball - State Champions 1995, 2004, 2005, 2012
- Girls' Basketball - State Champions 2020 (tie)
- Boys' Soccer - State Champions 1968 (tie), 1971, 1987 (tie), 1995, 2000
- Girls' Soccer - State Champions 1991, 1992, 2003
- Boys' Ice Hockey - State Champions 1984, 1988
- Girls' Ice Hockey - State Champions 2016
- Girls' Track - State Champions 1998, 1999, 2004, 2021
- Boys' Track
- Girls' Cross Country
- Boys' Cross Country - State Champions 2005, 2006, 2007, 2009, 2010, 2011
- Boys' Lacrosse - State Champions 2005
- Girls' Lacrosse - State Champions 2003, 2004
- Boys' Golf - State Champions 2005
- Boys' Alpine Skiing - State Champions 2005
- Girls' Alpine Skiing
- Dance - State Champions 2011, 2016, 2017, 2018, 2019, 2020, 2021, 2022, 2023, 2024
- Field Hockey - State Champions 1977 (tie), 1978
- Boys' Nordic Skiing - State Champions 2016, 2024, 2025
- Girls' Nordic Skiing - State Champions 2025
- Softball - State Champions 1996, 2004
- Wrestling - 2013 NVAC Champions
- Boys' Tennis
- Girls' Tennis
- Boys' Indoor Track
- Girls' Indoor Track

== Activities offered ==
- Advisory (mandatory for full-time students)
- American Sign Language Club
- Astronomy Club
- Book Club
- Card Game Playing Student-Led Group
- CLASH (philosophy and debate club)
- Community Service Club (4 hours of community service are required for all students every semester, and the club helps students meet or go beyond this requirement.)
- Theater Department
- Economics Club (Winners of 2015 and 2017 Vermont Treasury Cup)
- Environmental Club
- Film Club
- GSTA (Gay, Straight, Transgender Alliance)
- International Club
- Juggling Club
- Math League
- Model United Nations Student-Led Group
- Outing Club
- Paw Print (Student-produced magazine)
- Plant Club
- The Tapeworm (School Satirical Newspaper
- Scholars Bowl (2013, 2017 Medlar Cup winners)
- Science Fiction Club
- Student Council
- Yearbook
- Literary Magazine (MMUSE)

== Notable alumni ==
- Barbara Ann Cochran, Former World Cup Alpine ski racer and Olympic Gold Medalist; Member of the Skiing Cochrans
- Bob Cochran (skier), Former World Cup Alpine Ski racer and member of the Skiing Cochrans
- Lindy Cochran, Former World Cup Alpine Ski racer and member of the Skiing Cochrans
- Marilyn Cochran, Former World Cup Alpine Ski racer and member of the Skiing Cochrans
