= Ryan Cochran-Siegle =

American alpine skier (born 1992)

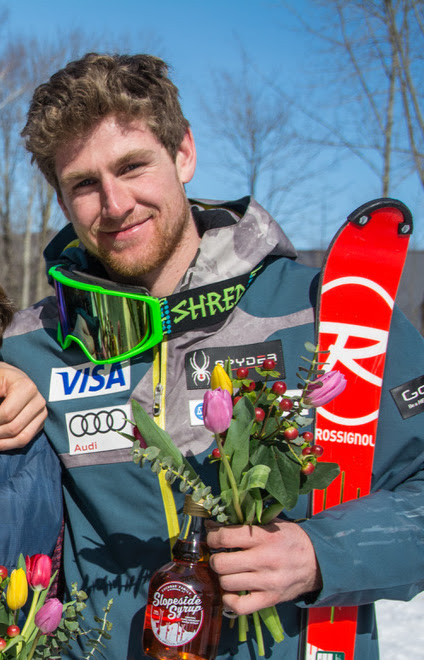
- Cochran-Siegle in 2017

Personal information
- Born: March 27, 1992 (age 34) Burlington, Vermont, U.S.
- Height: 6 ft 1 in (185 cm)
- Parent: Barbara Cochran (mother)
- Family: Marilyn Cochran (aunt); Bob Cochran (uncle); Lindy Cochran (aunt); Jimmy Cochran (cousin); Tim Kelley (cousin); Robby Kelley (cousin)

Skiing career
- Country: United States
- Sport: Alpine skiing
- Club: Mount Mansfield
- Disciplines: Super-G, Downhill, Combined, Giant slalom
- World Cup debut: November 26, 2011 (age 19)

Olympics
- Teams: 3 – (2018, 2022, 2026)
- Medals: 2 (0 gold)

World Championships
- Teams: 5 – (2013, 2017, 2019, 2023, 2025)
- Medals: 0

World Cup
- Seasons: 14 – (2012–2014, 2016–2026)
- Wins: 1 – (1 SG)
- Podiums: 5 – (4 DH, 1 SG)
- Overall titles: 0 – (15th in 2022)
- Discipline titles: 0 – (8th in DH, 2024)
Medal record
Men's alpine skiing
Representing the United States
Olympic Games
Silver medal – second place	2022 Beijing	Super-G
Silver medal – second place	2026 Milano Cortina	Super-G
World Junior Championships
Gold medal – first place	2012 Roccaraso	Downhill
Gold medal – first place	2012 Roccaraso	Combined

Ryan Cochran-Siegle (born March 27, 1992, nicknamed RCS) is an American World Cup alpine ski racer and a member of the Skiing Cochrans family. Cochran-Siegle competes mainly in the speed disciplines, despite initially being a giant slalom specialist. He also races in combined. He made his World Cup debut on November 26, 2011; his Olympic debut was in 2018, and he was the silver medalist in the super-G in 2022 and 2026.

== Career ==
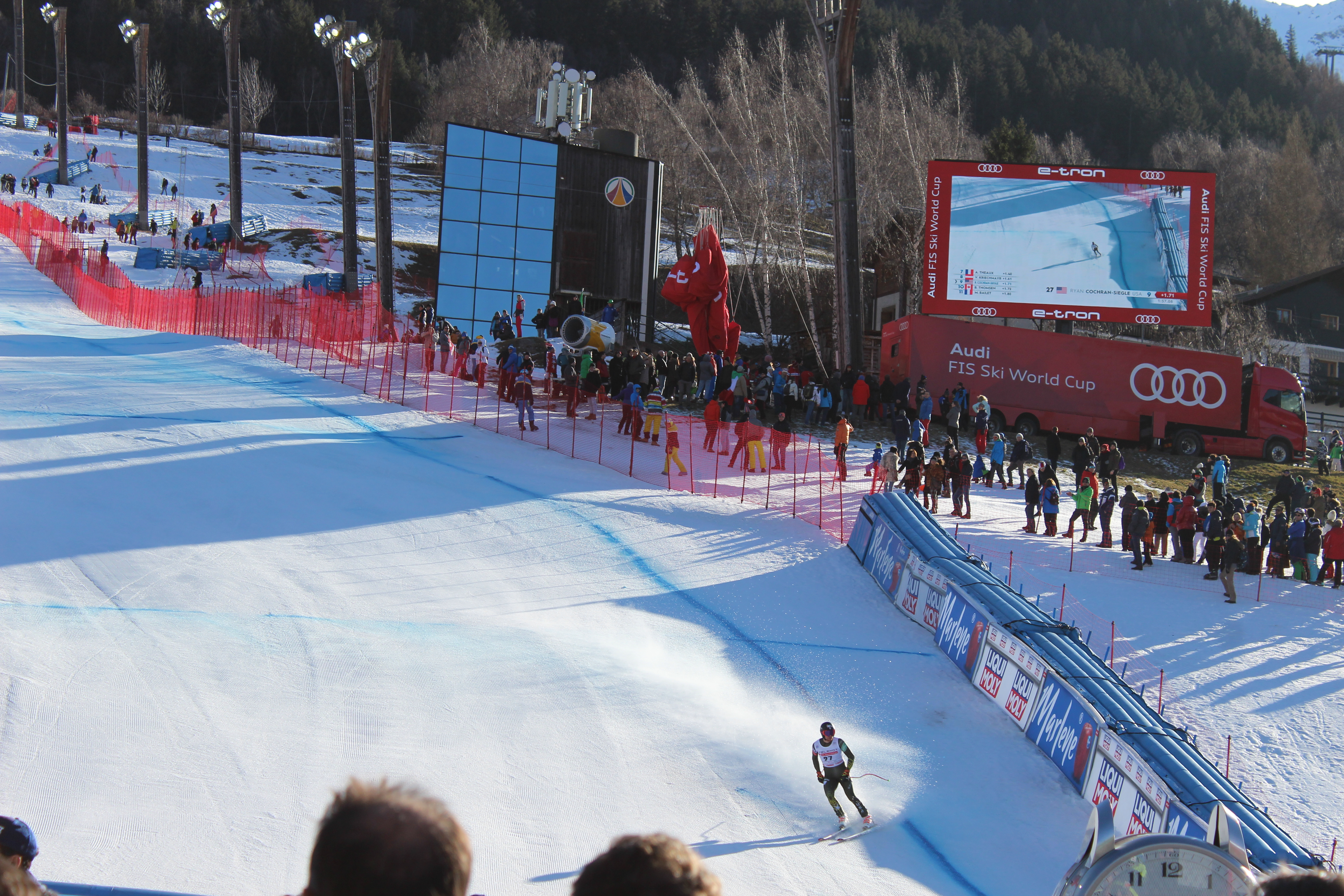
Cochran-Siegle at Bormio in 2019

Cochran-Siegle learned to ski at around the age of two, being taught by his mother Barbara Cochran, gold medalist in the slalom at the 1972 Winter Olympics in Sapporo, Japan.

In 2010 he graduated from Mount Mansfield Academy, in Stowe, Vermont. Before than, he raced there for 4 years.

After the 2010 season, he joined the U.S. Development Team, and one year later, he was promoted to the National B Team. He was the Nor-Am Cup super-G champion in 2011 and took a bronze medal in the super-G at the U.S. national championships. Cochran-Siegle made his World Cup debut in November 2011 at the Lake Louise downhill, but failed to finish. A week later in Colorado, he scored his first World Cup points in a super-G at Beaver Creek, finishing in 29th place.

In 2012, Cochran-Siegle won the Nor-Am downhill and super-G titles and two gold medals at the Junior World Championships, in downhill and combined. However, his progress was interrupted in 2013 when he suffered injuries to his anterior cruciate and medial collateral ligaments during the downhill portion of the combined at the World Championships. He returned to competition in the 2014 season, winning the overall Nor-Am Cup; he was second in the downhill standings and third in the super-G and giant slalom standings.

Cochran-Siegle took the 2015 season off to recover from a lateral meniscus transplant, then returned in the 2016 season, when he made his World Cup giant slalom debut and took his first World Cup point in GS with a 30th place at Kranjska Gora. He finished the season with good results at the national championships at Sun Valley, where he was runner-up in the super-G and giant slalom and fourth in the combined. In 2018, Cochran-Siegle was a member of the U.S. Olympic team and competed in four events; his best result was eleventh in the giant slalom.

== World Cup results ==
Season
Season	Age	Overall	Slalom	Giant slalom	Super-G	Downhill	Combined
2012	19	131	—	—	53	—	—
2013	20	106	—	—	41	52	27
2014	21	no World Cup points earned					
2015	22	injured: out for season					
2016	23	163	—	58	—	—	—
2017	24	83	—	38	37	—	20
2018	25	75	—	33	—	—	16
2019	26	53	—	26	23	43	31
2020	27	20	—	20	20	14	10
2021	28	22	—	33	10	14	—N/a
2022	29	15	—	56	10	10	—N/a
2023	30	29	—	—	18	17	—N/a
2024	31	24	—	—	19	8	—N/a
2025	32	28	—	—	18	12	—N/a
2026	33	20	—	—	15	9	—N/a

=== Race podiums ===
- 1 win (1 SG)
- 5 podiums (4 DH, 1 SG), 34 top tens

Season
Season	Date	Location	Discipline	Place
2021	December 19, 2020	Val Gardena, Italy	Downhill	2nd
2021	December 29, 2020	Bormio, Italy	Super-G	1st
2025	December 21, 2024	Val Gardena, Italy	Downhill	3rd
2026	December 4, 2025	Beaver Creek, United States	Downhill	2nd
2026	February 1, 2026	Crans-Montana, Switzerland	Downhill	3rd

== World Championship results ==
Year
Year	Age	Slalom	Giant slalom	Super-G	Downhill	Combined	Team combined
2013	20	—	—	15	—	DNF1	—N/a
2015	22	Injured: out for season					—N/a
2017	24	—	25	28	—	19	—N/a
2019	26	—	—	11	12	18	—N/a
2021	28	Injured: missed event					—N/a
2023	30	—	—	18	24	10	—N/a
2025	32	—	—	7	13	—N/a	4

== Olympic results ==
Year
Year	Age	Slalom	Giant slalom	Super-G	Downhill	Combined	Team combined
2018	25	—	11	14	23	DNF1	—N/a
2022	29	—	DNF1	2	14	—	—N/a
2026	33	—	—	2	18	—N/a	—
