= Vermont Sports Hall of Fame =

Athletics hall of fame in the U.S. state of Vermont

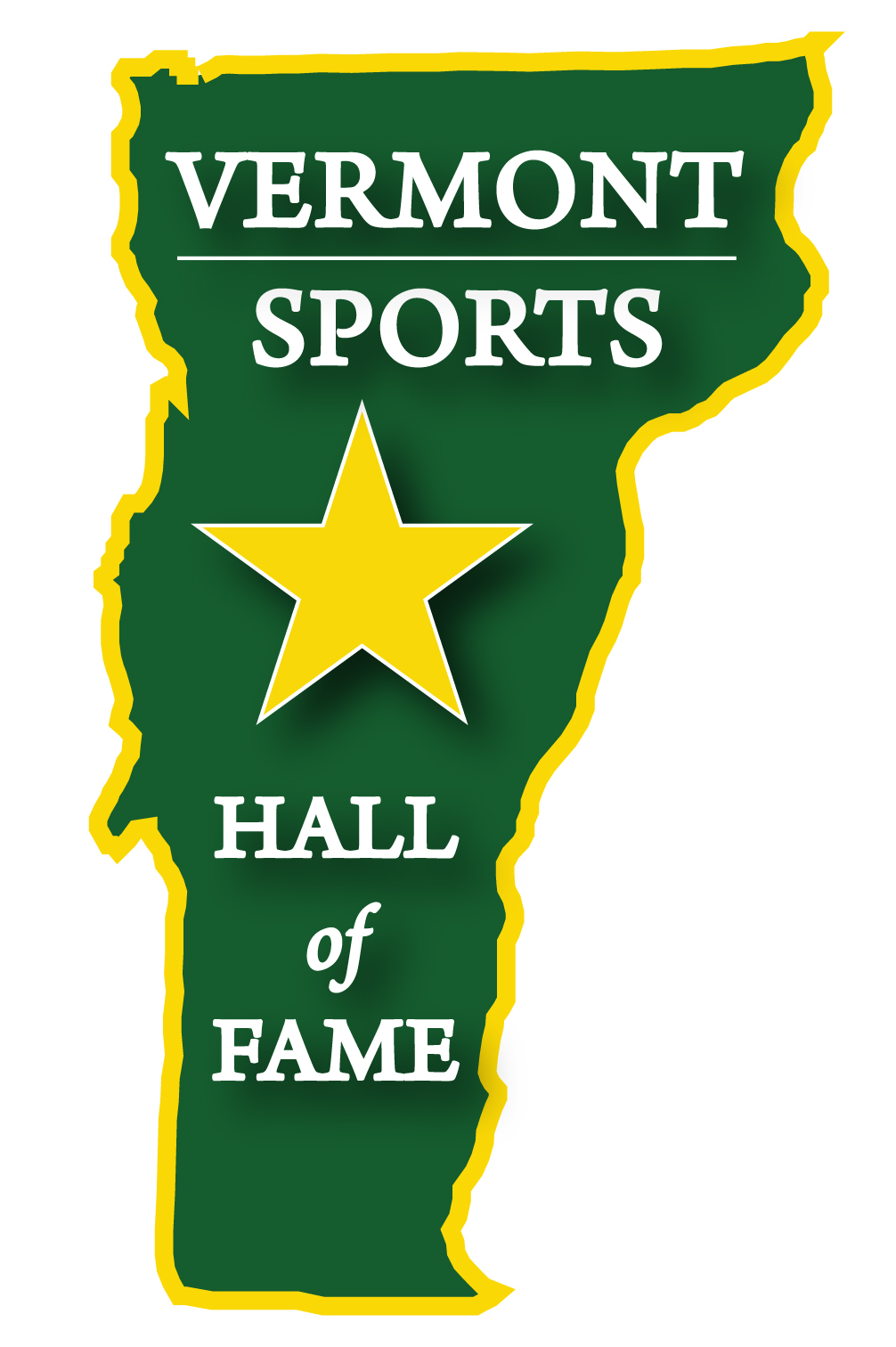

The Vermont Sports Hall of Fame is an athletics hall of fame in the U.S. state of Vermont. Above all, induction "is for accomplishments in sports and recreation that generate a great source of pride to the state." Launched as a project in 2011, the Hall of Fame inducted its inaugural class on November 17, 2012. Inductees include multiple Olympic athletes and medalists, professional sports hall of fame inductees, and historical contributors from the state of Vermont or one of its colleges and universities.

== Inductees ==
=== Class of 2012 ===
- Larry Benoit, outdoors
- Jen Carlson, soccer
- Ray Collins, baseball
- Larry Gardner, baseball
- Albert Gutterson, track & field
- Bill Koch, Nordic skiing
- Andrea Mead Lawrence, alpine skiing
- John LeClair, ice hockey
- Nicole Levesque Andres, basketball
- Bob Yates, football
- Tony Adams, contributor - media
- Jake Burton Carpenter, contributor - snowboarding
- Ken Squier, contributor - auto racing and media

=== Class of 2013 ===
- Charles Adams, historical pioneer
- Barbara Cochran, alpine skiing
- Keith Cieplicki, basketball
- Ollie Dunlap, football
- Ray Fisher, baseball
- Edward Kehoe, contributor - outdoors
- Billy Kidd, alpine skiing
- Ralph LaPointe, baseball
- Phil Latreille, ice hockey
- Jean Robinson, contributor - coach
- Gretchen Scheuermann, field hockey

=== Class of 2014 ===
- John Buffum, motor sports
- Bob Cochran, alpine skiing
- Marilyn Cochran, alpine skiing
- Michael D. Gallagher, Nordic skiing/running
- Ted Hoehn, tennis
- Jade Huntington, basketball
- George Jacobs, contributor - coach/athletic director
- Ernie Johnson, baseball
- Mae Murray Jones, golf
- Judi St. Hilaire, track & field/running
- James P. Taylor, historical inductee - outdoors

=== Class of 2015 ===
- Shelly Addison Smith, soccer
- Carl Christensen, soccer
- Bobby Dragon, stock car racing
- Mona Garone, contributor - coach
- Tom Lawson, contributor - coach/administrator
- Jack Leggett, multisport athlete/contributor - coach
- Jim McCaffrey, basketball
- Kirk McCaskill, baseball/ice hockey
- Bev Osterberg, contributor - coach
- Matha Rockwell, Nordic skiing
- Laura Wilson Todd, Nordic skiing
- Fred Harris, historical inductee - outdoors/ski jumping

=== Class of 2017 ===
- John H. Caldwell, Nordic skiing
- Bernie Cieplicki Sr., basketball - athlete/coach
- Lindy Cochran, alpine skiing
- Tad Coffin, equestrian
- Clarence DeMar, distance running/historical pioneer
- Don Fillion, media - sportswriter
- Missy Foote, field hockey/lacrosse
- Guy Gaudreau, ice hockey/soccer
- Ed Markey, basketball/administrator
- Tony Robitaille, boxing
- Martha Rockwell, Nordic skiing
- Betsy Snite, alpine skiing

=== Class of 2018 ===
- Tim Caldwell, Nordic skiing
- Robbie Crouch, stock car racing
- Hilary Engisch Klein, moguls skiing
- Ray Frey, track & field - coach
- Matt Johnson, basketball
- Larry Killick, basketball
- Melba Masse, athlete/contributor/coach
- David Morse, contributor - Mal Boright Media inductee
- Bobby Mitchell, football
- Jen Niebling, basketball
- Martin St. Louis, ice hockey

=== Class of 2019 ===
- Ann Battelle, moguls skiing
- Bill Beaney, ice hockey
- Elizabeth Burnham, softball
- Larry Damon, Nordic skiing
- Harmon 'Beaver' Dragon, stock car racing
- Jenny Everett, field hockey
- Layne Higgs, basketball
- Jeff Hughes, football
- Ross Powers, snowboarding
- Holly Reynolds, golf
- Tiger Shaw, alpine skiing
- Richard Tarrant, basketball

=== Class of 2020 ===
- Tara Chaplin, track & field
- Jim Cross, ice hockey
- Toby Ducolon, ice hockey
- Debbie Dunkley, gymnastics
- Jeff Hastings, ski jumping
- Ed Hockenbury, basketball
- Tom Pierce, golf
- Sarah Schreib, basketball
- Libby Smith, golf/basketball
- Carol Weston, hockey/soccer/track & field

=== Class of 2022 ===
The hall's 2022 inductees included:

- Jayne Barber, basketball
- Taylor Coppenrath, basketball
- Stan Dunklee, Nordic skiing
- Cathy Inglese, basketball
- Bill O'Neil, ice hockey/soccer/softball
- Erin Sullivan Lane, cross country/track & field
- Tim Thomas, ice hockey

=== Class of 2023 ===
The 2023 inductees were:

- Suzy Chaffee, Olympic alpine skier
- Kelly Clark, Olympic snowboarder
- Lea Davison, Olympic mountain biker
- Jake Eaton, college football standout
- David Fredrickson, high school basketball coach
- Jasmyn Huntington Fletcher, high school and college basketball player
- John Koerner, high school soccer player
- Doug Lewis, Olympic alpine skier
- Bob Molinatti, para-athlete
- Morgan Valley, basketball player and coach

=== Class of 2024 ===
The 2024 inductees were:

- Shawn Baker, golf
- David Ball, track & field
- George Commo, broadcasting
- Gail Jette, coach
- Andrew Johnson, skiing
- Jim Larkin, ice hockey
- Kevin Lepage, auto racing
- Kristi Lefebvre, soccer
- Donald Maley, Sr., coach
- Andy Natowich, coach
- Dr. Kim Silloway, basketball
- Alyssa Trudel, lacrosse
- Barry Stone, administration

=== Class of 2025 ===
The 2025 inductees were:

- Nini Wuensch Anger, gymnastics
- Debra Brown, horseshoes
- Kyle Dezotell, soccer
- Lou DiMasi III, ice hockey
- Carlie Geer, rowing
- Jim Holland, ski jumping
- Tony Orciari, basketball
- Connie LaRose, coach
- Bill Looker, football and track & field
- Leo Papineau, coach and administrator (historical inductee)
- Frank Pecora, coach
- Mike Rochford, baseball

=== Class of 2026 ===
The 2026 inductees were:

- Sarah Dalton Graddock, lacrosse
- Susan Dunklee, biathlete
- Dick Falkenbush, basketball player and coach
- Steven Forrest, wrestling
- Mickey Heinecken, football coach
- Mary Heitkamp, track & field and cross country
- Hannah Kearney, mogul skier
- Mike McShane, ice hockey coach
- Matt Raleigh, baseball
- Fenwick Watkins, multi-sport athlete and coach (historical inductee)

== David Hakins Memorial Inductee ==
The David Hakins Memorial Inductee award is given to a person, business leader or organization that demonstrates exceptional promotion and development of sports, athletics and recreation in the state of Vermont. The award is named in memory of the late David Hakins, a Vermont businessman who was a founding member of the Vermont Sports Hall of Fame and first president of its board of directors.

- 2013: Ray Pecor Jr., former owner of the Vermont Lake Monsters
- 2014: Tom Curley, motor sports contributor/former owner of Thunder Road International SpeedBowl
- 2015: Ernie Farrar, Vermont Golden Gloves
- 2017: Helmut Lenes, mountain climbing/outdoors
- 2019: Mal Boright, sports journalist
- 2020: Mickey and Ginny Cochran, alpine skiing
- 2020: Ted Ryan, sports journalist
- 2023: Thomas Dunkley, gymnastics pioneer
- 2026: Jake Agna, tennis coach

== Mal Boright media inductee ==
The Mal Boright award for excellence in sports journalism honors Boright's five decades of covering Vermont sports and his role as a founder of the Vermont Sports Hall of Fame in 2011.

- 2023: Andy Gardiner, sportswriter
- 2025: Jack Healey, broadcasting
- 2026: Tom Haley, sportswriter
