= Robby Kelley =

American alpine skier (born 1990)

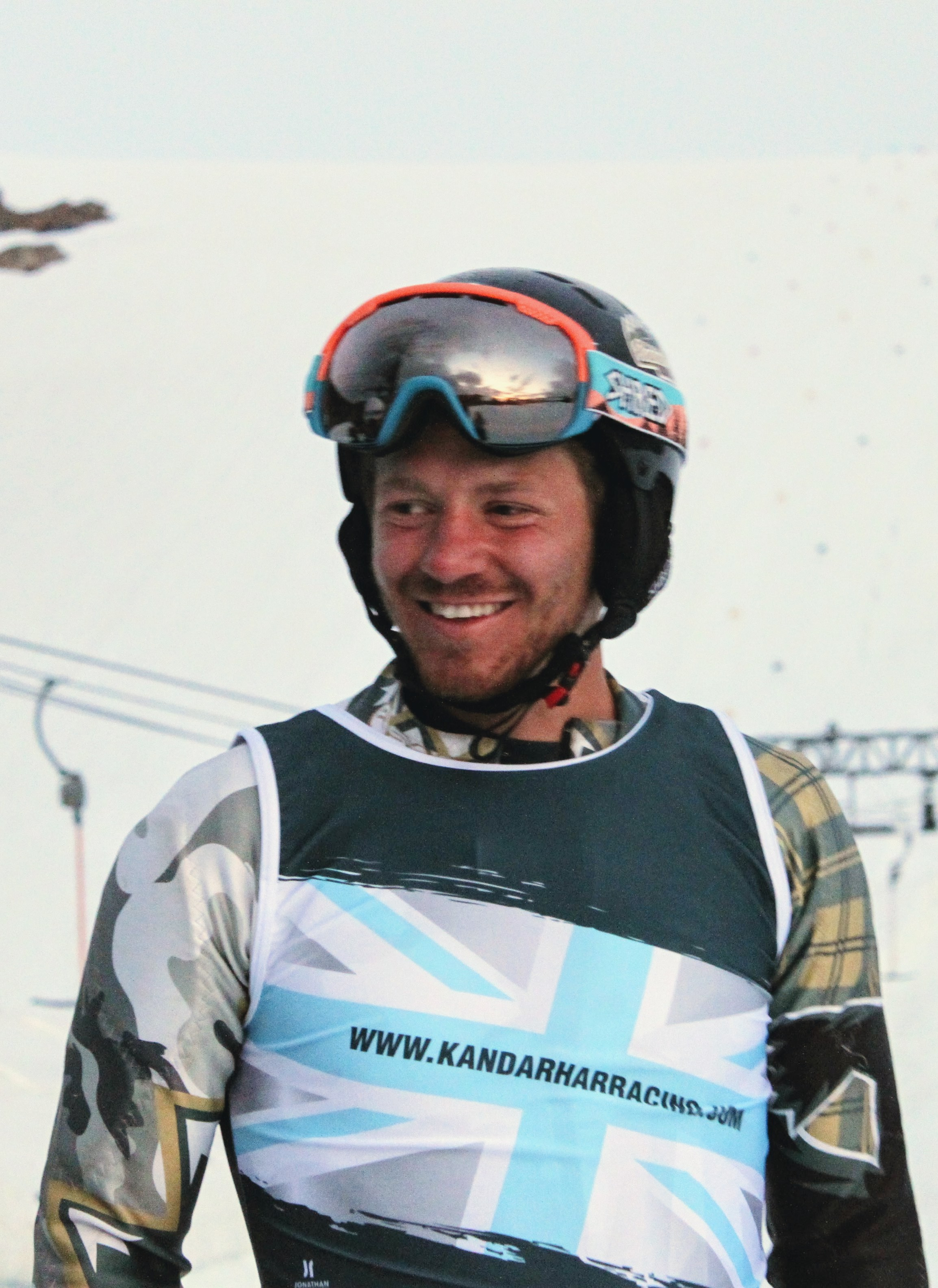
- Kelley in 2017

Personal information
- Born: 26 May 1990 (age 36) Burlington, VT, USA
- Height: 5 ft 10 in (178 cm)
- Website: robbykelley.com

Skiing career
- Sport: Alpine skiing ♂
- Club: Mt. Mansfield Ski Club and Cochran's Ski Club
- Disciplines: Slalom and Giant Slalom
- World Cup debut: 2012

World Championships
- Teams: 2013, 2017

World Cup
- Seasons: 5
- Wins: 0
- Podiums: 0
- Overall titles: 0 – (133rd in 2013)
- Discipline titles: 0 – (45th in GS, 2013)

Robby Kelley (born May 26, 1990) is an American former alpine ski racer from Starksboro, Vermont. Kelley specializes in the technical events of Slalom and Giant Slalom. He made his World Cup debut on October 27, 2012, and has represented the U.S. in the World Championships in 2013 and 2017. He helped found Redneck Racing along with Andrew McNealus and Tucker Marshall. They are a team of independent Vermont racers.

In 2019 he started Castleton University and will be playing football with them and skiing for the Division III Spartans.

== Family ==
He is one of the Skiing Cochrans, the son of Lindy Cochran Kelley, nephew of Barbara Ann, Marilyn, and Bobby Cochran, brother of Tim and Jessica Kelley, and cousin of Ryan Cochran-Siegle and Jimmy Cochran.

== World Cup results ==
=== Season standings ===
Season	Age	Overall	Slalom	Giant slalom	Super-G	Downhill	Combined
2013	22	133	—	45	—	—	—
2014	23	145	—	52	—	—	—
2015	24	—N/a	0 points				
2016	25	—N/a	0 points				
2017	26	147	56	—	—	—	—

=== Other Results ===
- 1 Podium in European Cup
- 7 Podiums in Nor-Am Cup
- 2012 US National Giant Slalom Champion
