= Gray Rocks (Richmond, Vermont) =

- U.S. National Register of Historic Places
- U.S. Historic district
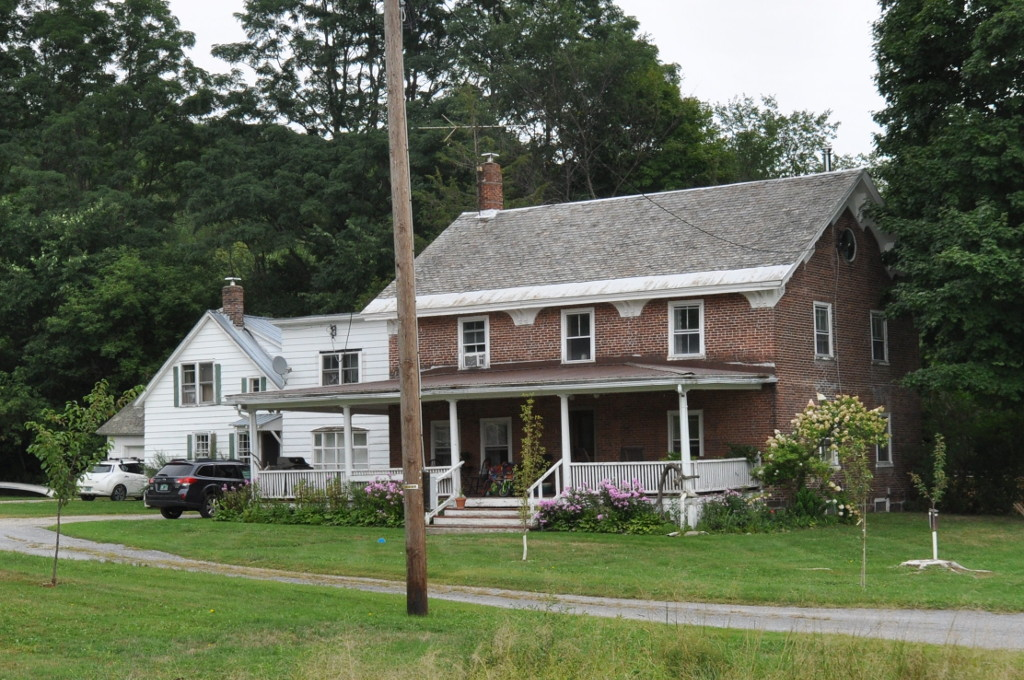

- Location within Vermont Location within the United States
- Location: US 2, near jct. with I-89, Richmond, Vermont
- Coordinates: 44°24′5″N 72°58′29″W
- Area: 380 acres (150 ha)
- Built: 1813
- MPS: Agricultural Resources of Vermont MPS
- NRHP reference No.: 96001534
- Added to NRHP: December 27, 1996

Gray Rocks is a historic farm property on United States Route 2 in Richmond, Vermont. Developed in the early 19th century, it was in agricultural use until 1978, and has a well-preserved set of farm buildings dating from c. 1813 to the early 20th century. It was listed on the National Register of Historic Places in 1996.

== Description and history ==
Gray Rocks is located east of Richmond's town center, on 380 acres (150 ha) of land straddling United States Route 2. The property extends in part across the right-of-way of Interstate 89 to the northern bank of the Winooski River, and north into the hills above the river floodplain. Much of the area south of US 2 is open land, now in pasture or hay, and there are sections of open land north of the road, where most of the land is wooded. The cluster of farm buildings is set on both sides of US 2, with the farmhouse and garage on the north side, and barns and other outbuildings on the south side. The farmhouse is a two-story brick gable-roofed building, set facing west. It has a porch extending across its front, and is basically Federal in its architecture, although it has Italianate paired brackets in its eaves.

The property was developed as a farm about 1800 by James Butler, who sold it in 1813 to Asa Rhodes, with the house then standing. It was farmed for over a century by members of the Rhodes family, and in the 20th century by the Andrewses, who ceased operations in 1978. The farm's buildings represent changing trends in agriculture during that time, from general agriculture to specializations first in sheep and then dairy.

== See also ==
- National Register of Historic Places listings in Chittenden County, Vermont
