= Barbara Cochran =

American alpine skier

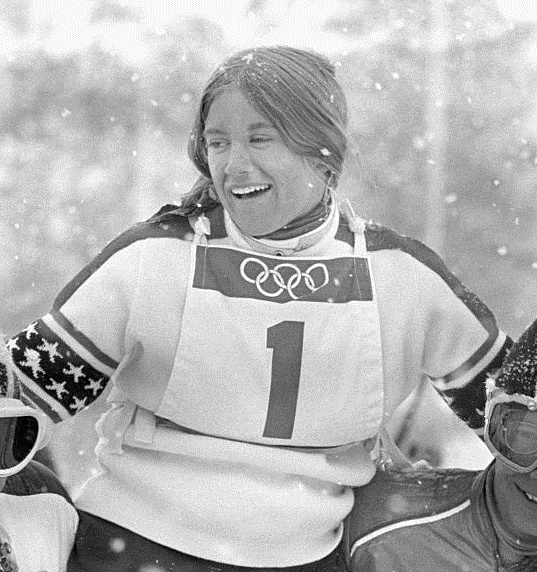
- Cochran at the 1972 Olympics

Personal information
- Born: January 4, 1951 (age 75) Claremont, New Hampshire, United States
- Height: 5 ft 1 in (155 cm)
- Website: sportssuccesscoaching.com

Skiing career
- Sport: Alpine skiing
- Retired: March 1974 (age 23)
- Disciplines: Slalom, giant slalom
- World Cup debut: March 1968 (age 17)

Olympics
- Teams: 1 – (1972)
- Medals: 1 (1 gold)

World Championships
- Teams: 3 – (1970, 1972, 1974) includes Olympics
- Medals: 2 (1 gold)

World Cup
- Seasons: 6 – (1969–1974)
- Wins: 3 – (2 SL, 1 GS)
- Podiums: 18 – (11 SL, 7 GS)
- Overall titles: 0 – (5th in 1970)
- Discipline titles: 0 – (2nd in SL, 1970)
Medal record
Women's alpine skiing
Representing the United States
Olympic Games
Gold medal – first place	1972 Sapporo	Slalom
World Championships
Silver medal – second place	1970 Val Gardena	Slalom

Barbara Ann Cochran (born January 4, 1951) is a former World Cup alpine ski racer and Olympic gold medalist from the United States.

Born in Claremont, New Hampshire, Cochran was the second of four siblings of the famous "Skiing Cochrans" family of Richmond, Vermont, which has operated a small ski area in their backyard since 1961. Her father, Gordon "Mickey" Cochran, was a longtime coach, coaching youngsters of the Smuggler's Notch Ski Club, the University of Vermont Ski Team, and the U.S. Ski Team. The family has placed several generations of athletes on the U.S. Ski Team: three-time national champion sister Marilyn, Barbara Ann, nine-time national champion brother Bob, and two-time national champion sister Lindy. The family's next generation includes niece Jessica Kelley, nephews Jimmy Cochran, Roger Brown, Tim Kelley, Robby Kelley, and son, Ryan Cochran-Siegle, who won silver medals in the Super-G at the 2022 and 2026 Winter Olympics.

After retiring from competitions, Cochran graduated from college in Vermont, married Ron Williams, and published her book Skiing for Women. She eventually became a writer for The Washington Post.

Cochran now lives in her home in Starksboro, working on her own business, Golden Opportunities in Sports, Business, and Life, which teaches people how to handle the pressures of competition, work, academics, and any other challenges. She also works at Cochran's Ski Area in Richmond, which is situated in the "back yard" of her childhood home. Cochran was inducted into the National Ski Hall of Fame in 1976, later joined by siblings Marilyn (1978) and Bob (2010). In 1979, the Supersisters trading card set was produced and distributed; one of the cards featured Cochran's name and picture. Cochran was also inducted into the then-recently established Vermont Sports Hall of Fame in 2013.

== Career highlights ==
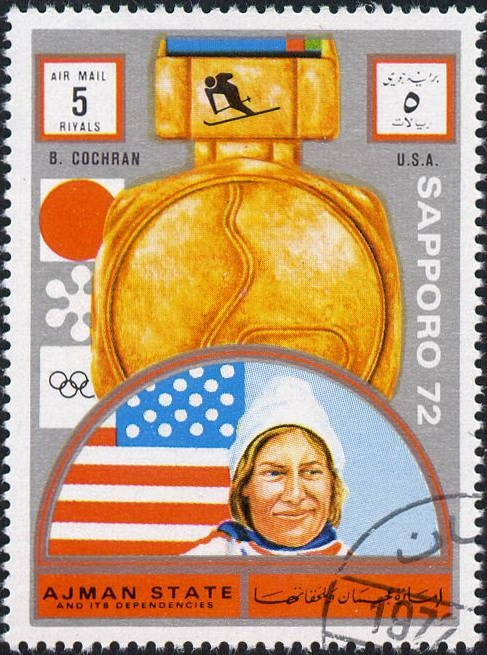
Cochran on a stamp of Ajman

- Gold medal in slalom at the 1972 Winter Olympics in Sapporo, Japan
  - won by 0.02 seconds, the smallest winning margin in Olympic history.
- Silver medal in slalom at the 1970 World Championships in Val Gardena, Italy
- Three World Cup victories, 18 podiums, 45 top tens
- Two-time U.S. national champion.

== World Cup results ==
=== Season standings ===
Season	Age	Overall	Slalom	Giant slalom	Super G	Downhill	Combined
1968	17	36	22	—	not run	—	not run
1969	18	18	9	26	not run	—	not run
1970	19	5	2	4	not run	—	not run
1971	20	8	3	12	not run	—	not run
1972	21	12	6	18	not run	—	not run
1973	22	21	10	23	not run	—	not run
1974	23	14	7	11	not run	—	not run

Points were only awarded for top ten finishes (see scoring system).

=== Race podiums ===
- 3 wins – (2 SL, 1 GS)
- 18 podiums – (11 SL, 7 GS)

Season	Date	Location	Discipline	Place
1970	10 Dec 1969	Val d'Isere, France	Giant slalom	2nd
1970	12 Dec 1969	Val d'Isere, France	Slalom	2nd
1970	19 Dec 1969	Lienz, Austria	Giant slalom	3rd
1970	4 Jan 1970	Oberstaufen, West Germany	Giant slalom	3rd
1970	17 Jan 1970	(Socialist Federal Republic of Yugoslavia) Maribor, Yugoslavia	Giant slalom	3rd
1970	18 Jan 1970	(Socialist Federal Republic of Yugoslavia) Maribor, Yugoslavia	Slalom	1st
1970	13 Feb 1970	Val Gardena, Italy – (W.Ch.)	Slalom	2nd
1970	22 Feb 1970	(United States) Jackson Hole, WY, USA	Slalom	2nd
1970	27 Feb 1970	Vancouver, BC, Canada	Giant slalom	2nd
1971	4 Jan 1971	(Socialist Federal Republic of Yugoslavia) Maribor, Yugoslavia	Slalom	3rd
1971	29 Jan 1971	St. Gervais, France	Slalom	2nd
1971	13 Feb 1971	Mt. Ste. Anne, QC, Canada	Slalom	2nd
1971	24 Feb 1971	(United States) Heavenly Valley, CA, USA	Slalom	1st
1971	26 Feb 1971	(United States) Heavenly Valley, CA, USA	Giant slalom	1st
1972	19 Jan 1972	Grindelwald, Switzerland	Slalom	3rd
1972	(Japan) 1972 Winter Olympics			
1972	18 Feb 1972	Banff, Alberta, Canada	Slalom	2nd
1973	13 Mar 1973	Naeba, Japan	Slalom	3rd
1974	9 Jan 1974	Les Gets, France	Giant slalom	2nd

World Championship results (Val Gardena, Italy) were included in the World Cup standings in 1970.

== Olympic results ==
Year	Age	Slalom	Giant slalom	Super-G	Downhill	Combined
1972	21	1	11	not run	—	not run

- From 1948 through 1980, the Winter Olympics were also the World Championships for alpine skiing.

== See also ==
- Skiing Cochrans
