= Round Church =

Round Church may refer to:

- Round Church, Orphir, Orkney, United Kingdom
- Round Church, Preslav, a 10th-century church in Preslav, Bulgaria
- Round Church, Cambridge or Holy Sepulchre, a 12th-century church in Cambridge, England, UK
- Round Church (Richmond, Vermont), a 19th-century meeting house in Richmond, Vermont, U.S.
- Round church, a special type of church construction, having a completely circular plan
