= Ray Pecor Jr. =

Ray Pecor Jr. is an American businessman and former owner of the Minor League Baseball Vermont Lake Monsters. He formerly owned the Ottawa Lynx baseball team, and the Lake Champlain Transportation Company. He is an inductee in the Vermont Sports Hall of Fame. He was born in Burlington, Vermont, and graduated from Burlington High School (Vermont), and later on from University of Vermont, for whom he currently serves on the board of trustees.
