= George Dallas Sherman =

American musician

George Dallas Sherman (August 23, 1844 – November 3, 1927) was an American bandleader.

Sherman was born in Richmond, Vermont, United States, the son of Hathaway and Relief Sherman. At the age of 14, he joined the Richmond Cornet Band and soon became its leader. He left this band in 1864 to join the 9th Vermont Infantry as a musician during the American Civil War. After the war he came to live in Winooski, where he married Mary A. Thompson and became a band teacher.

In 1878 he organized, with much coaxing from the citizens of Burlington, Sherman's Military Band, made up of musicians from the dormant Queen City Band. This band came to be well known all over the East as one of the finest touring Military Bands.

Sherman's Military Band ca 1882

After Sherman retired from the band in 1917, the group became known as the Burlington Military Band under the exceptional directorship of Dr. Joseph Lechnyr, an influential Vermont musician. George Sherman continued to live on Sherman Street (which many erroneously believe to be named after him) until November 3, 1927, the date of the great flood. On that day, while crossing the street near his home at the corner of Sherman and Battery Street (on the park side of Battery St.) at the age of 83, he was struck by a car and died two hours later of multiple lacerations and a fractured skull. His funeral was attended by Grand Army of the Republic comrades, and the Masonic Ritual was held at his graveside. He left three children at the time of his death.

Although Sherman is well remembered as one of the first leaders of what is known today as the Burlington Concert Band, he is also remembered for his fine marches, some of which were used by John Philip Sousa in his concert tours. A website has only three of Sherman's pieces, as many were lost in a fire in the same year as his death.

== Marches ==
Listed in the Daily Free Press, January 26, 1888

- Salute To Burlington
- Free Press March
- Stannard Post March

Published by Jean Missud of Salem, Massachusetts

Listed in the Daily Free Press, March 28, 1891

- Rock Point Cadets
- The Watchman
- The Independent

Published by Oliver Ditson & Co.

Listed in the Daily Free Press, March 31, 1892

- General William Wells
- General William Greenleaf
- Vermont University
- Cecilian March dedicated to the Ladies Quartette of St. Johnsbury
- The Belle of America (listed as "American Belle" HEBM V.II) Seitz 1893
- Sherman Military Band

Listed in the Heritage Encyclopedia of Band Music Vol II, October 1991

- American Union (Coleman, 1894)
- The Body Guard (John Church Co, 1903)
- the Brownie's Reception (Church, 1895)
- Burlington Commandery K.T. [Knights Templar](Gay, 1893)
- Cavalcade (Church, 1895)
- Coleman's March (Coleman, 1893)
- Evangeline (Seitz, 1893)
- The Floral Ball (Church, 1896)
- The Herald (Missud, 1889)
- Hero's Command (Church, 1895)
- Hope Beyond, dirge (Church, 1895)
- Invitation to the Wedding (Coleman, 1894)
- The King's Daughters, grand march (Church, 1895)
- The Millionaires (Church, 1896)
- Olive Branch (Barnhouse, 1907)
- Pilot (Missud, 1888)
- Prima Donna (Gay 1893)
- Remembrance of Stave Island (Church, 1895)
- St. Valentine (Church, 1896)
- The Stranger (Coleman, 1894)
- Vermont National Guards (Coleman, 1894)
- With Majesty (Colena, 1893)

== Non marches ==
- Algonquin Overture (Church, 1897)
- Cupid's Captive, waltz (Church, 1895)
- Dance of the Flower Girl (Coleman, 1895)
- Fleur de Luce, schottische (Church, 1898)
- Message of Love Waltz (Coleman, 1893)
- Rainbow Mazurka (Barnhouse, 1895)
- Scamper Galop (Coleman, 1894)

== Books ==
The Heritage Encyclopedia of Band Music : Composers and Their Music, William H. Rehrig, Paul E. Bierley (Editor), October 1991, ISBN 0-918048-08-7
