= Nott Memorial =

- Nott Memorial Hall
- U.S. National Register of Historic Places
- U.S. National Historic Landmark
- New York State Register of Historic Places
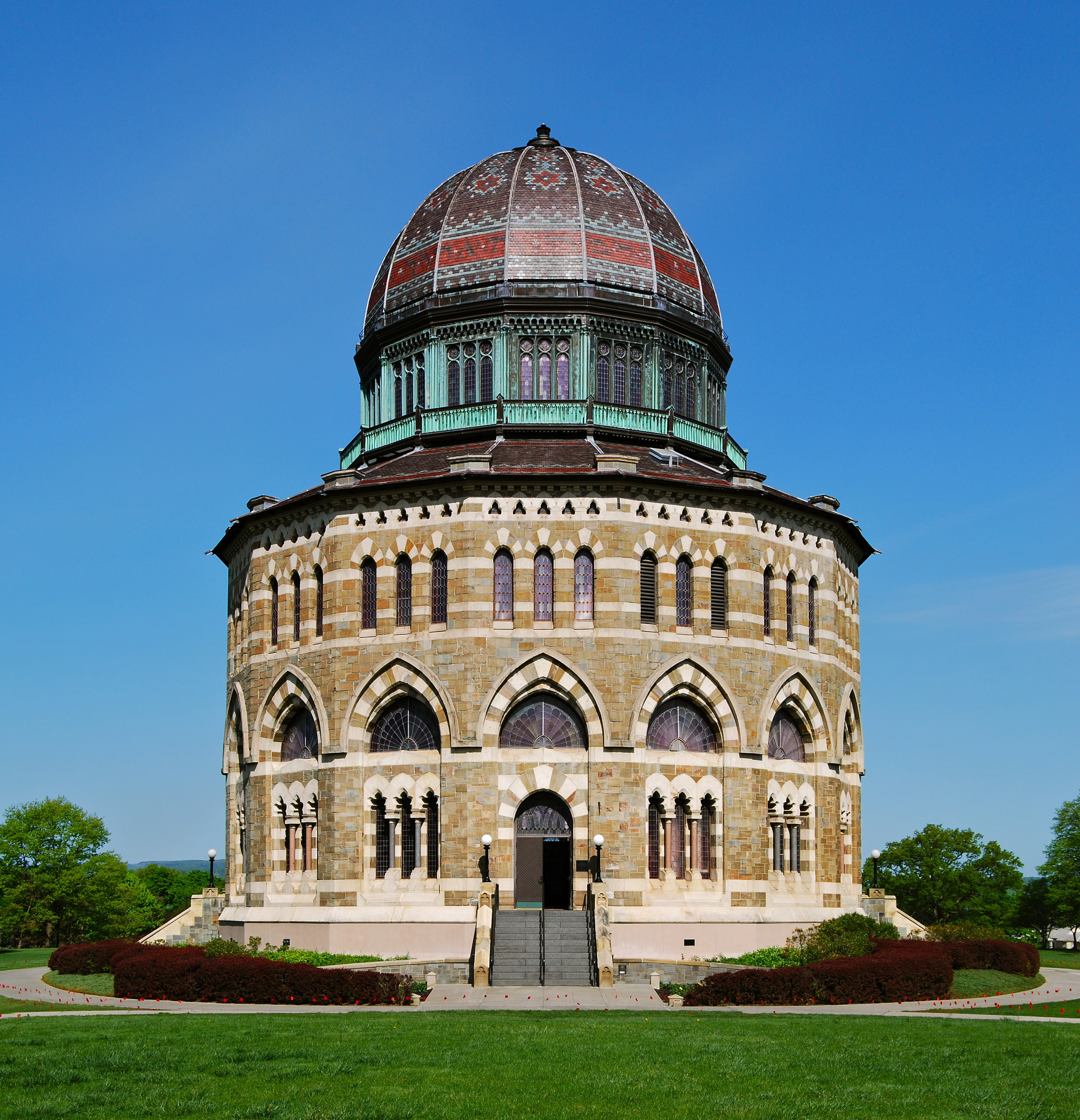
- View from east, 2009

- Location within New York Location within the United States
- Location: Schenectady, New York
- Coordinates: 42°49′2.06″N 73°55′49.09″W
- Built: 1858
- Architect: Edward Tuckerman Potter
- Architectural style: High Victorian Gothic
- NRHP reference No.: 72000912
- NYSRHP No.: 09340.000005

Significant dates
- Added to NRHP: May 5, 1972
- Designated NHL: June 24, 1986
- Designated NYSRHP: June 23, 1980

The Nott Memorial is an elaborate 16-sided stone-masonry building which serves as both architectural and physical centerpiece of Union College in Schenectady, New York. Dedicated to Eliphalet Nott, president of Union for sixty-two years (1804–1866), the 110-foot (34 m) high by 89-foot (27 m) wide structure is a National Historic Landmark, noted for its Victorian architecture.

== Design ==
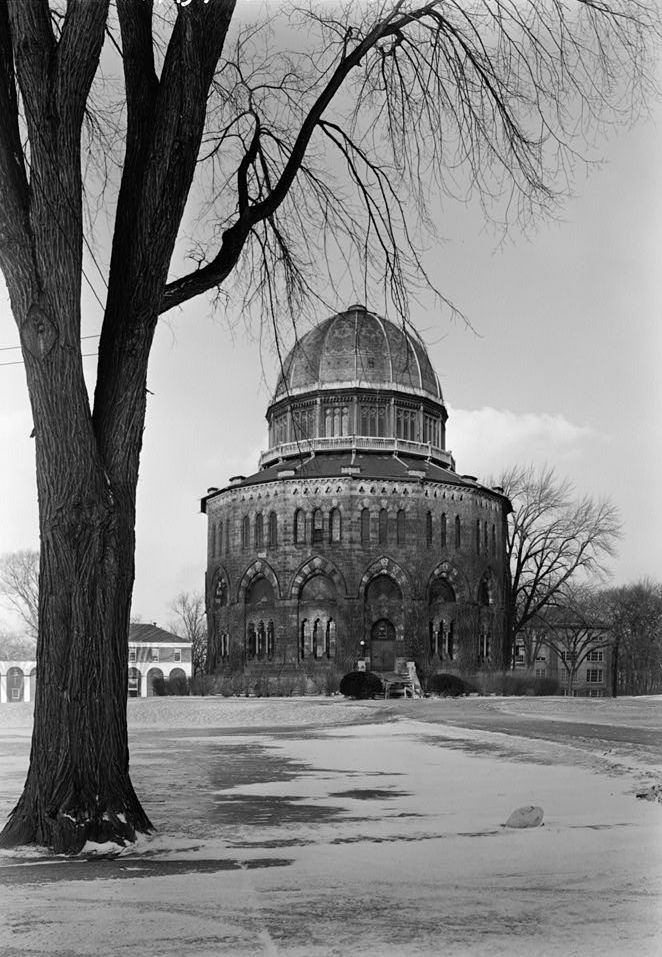
Nott Memorial in 1962

Officially designated Nott Memorial Hall but referred to by generations of students and faculty simply as "The Nott", the building's centrality and initial design trace back to Josef Ramee's 1813 conception of the school grounds, the first planned college campus in the United States.

The Memorial was designed by Edward Tuckerman Potter, architect of area churches and homes, alumnus of the college, and grandson of President Nott. Construction began in 1858 and was completed in 1879. The result is one of very few 16-sided buildings in the world. The only other building in the Northeastern United States with such a distinction is Vermont's Round Church, which predates the Nott by 45 years and was built by local architects available in the small New England town.

For nearly a century the Nott was mostly open inside. In 1961 the college moved its bookstore into the basement and configured the first two floors into theater in the round. The upper floors were eventually closed off and fell into disrepair.

== Restoration ==
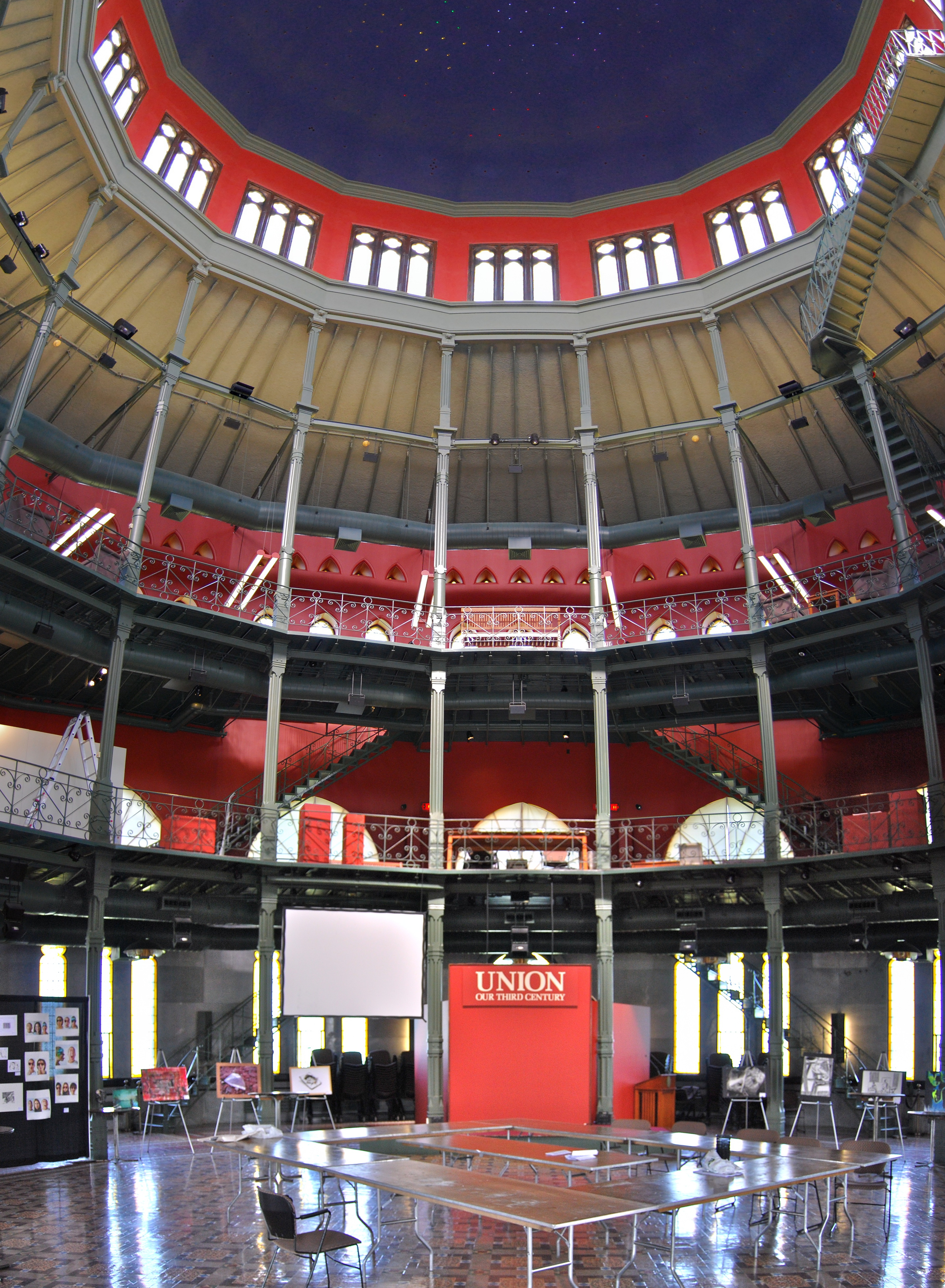
Interior of the Nott Memorial

In 1993 the college began a complete renovation of the Nott, restoring it to its original design. The award-winning project was undertaken by noted Boston based architecture firm Finegold Alexander & Associates and carried out by A. J. Martini Inc., contractors. The bookstore and theater were moved to other locations on the campus, and in 1995 the Nott reopened on the celebration of Union's 200th anniversary.

Once again, the center of the Nott is completely open to the top of its dome 102 feet (31 m) overhead. The main floor is a meeting room with seating for up to 400; the second and third levels ring the space and include galleries and informal meeting places for students. Two-hundred eighty-eight restored stained glass windows bathe the interior in colored light. Atop the dome a quotation in colored slate from Rabbi Tarfon, found in the Talmud's Pirkei Avot 2:15, which proclaims in Hebrew: "The day is short, and the work is plentiful, and the laborers are indolent, and the reward is great, and the master of the house is insistent."

The Memorial was listed on the National Register of Historic Places in 1972 and was further declared a National Historic Landmark in 1986.

=== Mandeville Gallery ===
The Interior of the Nott Memorial: The Mandeville Gallery is the 2nd floor.

The Mandeville Gallery opened in 1995 following the major restoration of the Nott Memorial and is located on the second floor. The Mandeville Gallery presents changing exhibitions featuring nationally recognized, contemporary artists exploring modern issues.

The Wikoff Student Gallery is located on the third floor of the Nott Memorial and presents changing exhibitions featuring the work of current, full-time Union College students.

Due to the unusual architecture of the Nott Memorial, the Mandeville Gallery provides a unique environment for viewing exhibitions. The Gallery is a mezzanine, open to the floors above and below, and is composed of two semi-circular areas of viewing, creating an atypical but creative gallery venue.
