= Richmond (CDP), Vermont =

Census-designated place in Vermont, United States

Richmond, Vermont
- Census-designated place
- Location within Vermont Location within the United States
- Coordinates: 44°24′19″N 73°00′06″W
- Country: United States
- State: Vermont
- County: Chittenden
- Town: Richmond

Area
  - Total: 1.36 sq mi (3.51 km^{2})
  - Land: 1.25 sq mi (3.24 km^{2})
  - Water: 0.10 sq mi (0.26 km^{2})
- Elevation: 312 ft (95 m)

Population (2020)
  - Total: 853
- Time zone: UTC-5 (Eastern (EST))
  - Summer (DST): UTC-4 (EDT)
- ZIP Code: 05477
- Area code: 802
- FIPS code: 50-59200
- GNIS feature ID: 2586651

Richmond is the primary village and a census-designated place (CDP) in the town of Richmond, Chittenden County, Vermont, United States. As of the 2020 census, it had a population of 853, out of 4,167 in the entire town of Richmond.

== Geography ==
The village is in eastern Chittenden County, in the north-central part of the town of Richmond. It is sited mainly on the north side of the Winooski River, with a small portion on the south side. U.S. Route 2 passes through the village as its Main Street, while Interstate 89 runs along the northern edge of the community, with access to the northwest from Exit 11 (Route 2). Both highways lead northwest 12 miles (19 km) to Burlington, the largest city in the state, and southeast 25 miles (40 km) to Montpelier, the state capital.
