= Carl Christensen (soccer) =

American soccer player and coach

Carl W. Christensen
Personal information
- Full name: Carl W. Christensen
- Date of birth: July 5, 1956 (age 70)
- Place of birth: Jackson, Michigan, U.S.
- Position: Defender

Youth career
- 1974–1977: University of Vermont

Senior career*
Years	Team	Apps	(Gls)
1978	Dallas Tornado	0	(0)
1978–1979	San Jose Earthquakes	14	(0)
1979–1980	Wichita Wings (indoor)	28	(1)

Managerial career
- 1981–1982: University of Vermont (assistant)
- 1983–1989: Tufts University
- * Club domestic league appearances and goals

Carl Christensen (born July 5, 1956) is an American retired soccer defender who played in the North American Soccer League and Major Indoor Soccer League.

== Player ==
Christensen graduated from Essex High School in Vermont. He then attended the University of Vermont, where he was a 1976 First Team All American soccer player. He was inducted into the University of Vermont Athletic Hall of Fame in 1988. In 1978, he signed with the Dallas Tornado of the North American Soccer League. He played no games for them before being traded to the San Jose Earthquakes where he finished the season, then played the 1979 season. In the fall of 1979, Christensen signed with the Wichita Wings of the Major Indoor Soccer League.

== Coach ==
Christensen served as an assistant coach to the University of Vermont soccer team in 1981 and 1982. In 1983, he became the head coach of the Tufts University soccer team. He coached the team for seven seasons and compiled a 97–28–5 record.

== Awards and honors ==
In December 1999, Sports Illustrated named Christensen number twenty-eight on its list of the top 50 athletes from Vermont. Christensen was inducted into the Vermont Sports Hall of Fame in 2015.

== Family ==
Christensen now lives in New Hampshire with his wife, Lori. He has a daughter Jenna, whom he loves dearly, and 5 other children.
