= Louis Greenough =

Louis Greenough (1853-1932) was a pioneer who was one of the first residents of Pierre, South Dakota in what was then the Dakota Territory. With Harry Adams, he is credited with building the first automobile in South Dakota. He worked in the hardware business, much of the time as a hardware merchant, for a total of 48 years working in the hardware field. He was involved in civics. He served on the city commission and the School Board. He was a member of the Democratic Party and a Roman Catholic. He was born in Richmond, Vermont, on November 15, 1853. He died in 1932 of a stroke.

In 1897 Louis Greenough saw an electric powered horseless carriage at the Yanktown State Fair, which inspired him to build an internal-combustion powered automobile. With the help of Harry Adams, he added a two-cylinder Wolverine engine to a traditional wagon and built the area's first internal combustion engine driven vehicle.

== Bibliography ==
- Pringle, Ruane. "Pierre’s First Horseless Carriage". Hughes County History-1964.
- . Online. March 19, 2008.
- History Of Crash Safety at Inner Auto Parts at www.innerauto.com
- Statewide County, SD History - Books .....Automobiles 1925
