= Mandeville Gallery =

Art gallery

Coordinates: 42.817321°N 73.929961°W

Interior of the Nott Memorial, with the Mandeville Gallery on the second floor

The Mandeville Gallery is an art gallery, located on the second floor of the Nott Memorial at Union College, Schenectady, New York, United States. The gallery opened in 1995 and is dedicated to exhibiting work by nationally recognized, contemporary artists exploring modern themes. Due to the unusual architecture of the Nott Memorial, the Mandeville Gallery provides a unique environment for viewing exhibitions. The Gallery is a mezzanine, open to the floors above and below, and consists of two semi-circular areas of viewing, creating an atypical but creative gallery venue.

The Permanent Collection houses over 3,000 works of art and material culture. Access to the collection is available to students, faculty, and researchers by appointment. Artwork from the Permanent Collection is on display in public and administrative areas across the college campus.

The Wikoff Student Gallery is located on the third floor of the Nott Memorial and exhibits work by current, full-time Union College students.

The Castrucci Gallery is located on the ground floor of the Peter Irving Wold Center, and features exhibitions that explores intersections of the visual arts, mathematics, and the sciences.

The Mandeville Gallery presents an annual Art Installation Series in partnership with the Schaffer Library. The Art Installation Series features contemporary artists who visit campus and create a site-specific installation for the library's Learning Commons.
