= Skiing Cochrans =

American family of alpine skiers

Coordinates: 44.396°N 72.982°W

Location in the United States
Location in Vermont

The Skiing Cochrans are a family of American alpine ski racers from Richmond, Vermont, a dominant force on the U.S. Ski Team in the late 1960s and early 1970s, and again in 2000s, 2010s and at present (2020s).

In 1961, parents Mickey and Ginny Cochran built a small ski area on their hillside property along the Winooski River in rural Vermont, the Cochrans' ski hill, where they trained their four children to be world-class ski racers. All four - Bob, Barbara Ann, Marilyn and Lindy - represented the U.S. in the Winter Olympics, with Barbara Ann winning the gold medal in slalom at the 1972 Winter Olympics in Sapporo, Japan. The next generation of Cochrans has continued the racing tradition, placing six family members on the U.S. Ski Team, while Cochran's Ski Area has grown into a local winter recreation area with three lifts and eight slopes attracting families from around Vermont.

== Parents ==
- Gordon T. "Mickey" Cochran (1924–1998) - An athlete, a soldier, an engineer, and a teacher all rolled into one, Mickey's talents added up to genius on the ski slopes. He was a standout athlete in baseball and football at Chelmsford High School in Massachusetts. He pitched and played quarterback for the University of Vermont until his engineering studies were interrupted by the war. He served in the 84th Infantry Division in France and Germany in World War II. His unit was surrounded in the Battle of the Bulge. He saw significant action, including crossing the Rhine on a floating foot bridge under fire. His squad saw 300% casualties between October 1944 and the end of the war in Europe. His athletic skills helped him to survive with minor wounds. While in the army he pitched batting practice in Europe for Ted Williams. He also played semi-pro baseball in the US and the provincial leagues in Canada. He returned to the University of Vermont after the war and earned a BS in mechanical engineering and a master's degree in education. He loved skiing and applied engineering to developing his own highly successful technique, independently of what was popular. Under his tutelage - and while training on the backyard ski hill that he built himself - all four of his children became members of the U.S. Ski Team. Among his other accomplishments, Mickey was the Alpine Director of the U.S. Team during the 1973-74 ski season and coach of the University of Vermont (UVM) Ski Team throughout the 1970s. With Mickey as alpine coach the UVM Ski Team won their first major winter carnivals, including Dartmouth in 1973, Middlebury and Williams, and began the longest regular season undefeated streak in NCAA history. Mickey died in March 1998 of congestive heart failure at the age of 74. The athletes he coached at UVM noted that he was all the man there is, and one of the greatest ski coaches ever. He was inducted into the UVM Athletic Hall of Fame in 1972.
- Virginia Davis "Ginny" Cochran (1928–2005) - Matriarch of "The Skiing Cochrans" and long-time co-owner of Cochran's Ski Area with her husband, Mickey. In 1961, when Cochran's first opened, Ginny started the first after-school learn-to-ski program at the area at the request of the Richmond PTO. Since that time, thousands of schoolchildren and older skiers have learned to "Ski the Cochran Way", a great many taught by Ginny herself. In addition to raising four children who competed in the Winter Olympics, Ginny managed the ski area until her death in 2005 at age 76. She was posthumously honored with a resolution by the state legislature.

== Children ==
- Marilyn Cochran Brown (born 1950) - member of the U.S. Ski Team (1967–74), 1969 World Cup giant slalom champion, 1970 World Championship bronze medalist in the combined, member of the 1972 US Olympic and 1974 World Championship teams, was three-time U.S. national champion. She won many awards including the Beck International Trophy as the top US international skier in 1971 and the Buddy Werner Award for sportsmanship in 1974. Marilyn was inducted into the U.S. Ski and Snowboard Hall of Fame in 1978. Her son Roger Brown was also a member of the U.S. Ski Team for two years after graduating with an engineering degree from Dartmouth ('04), where he was NCAA slalom champion in 2002 and a three-time All-American. He worked on Barack Obama's campaign in Georgia and Indiana during the 2008 election and was a Research Assistant for Senator Patrick Leahy of Vermont until November 2010 when he joined his brother Douglas, and cousins Jimmy Cochran and Timmy Kelley, to work on their new enterprise, Slopeside Syrup. Her other son, Douglas Brown, attended St. Lawrence University, where he was captain of the ski team for two years and an academic All-American. He graduated in May 2009. He coached skiing and taught chemistry at the Berkshire School in Massachusetts during the 2009-2010 school year. He now is working on the sugarbush with his brother and cousins, laying lines to tap ultimately 20,000 trees on the land originally purchased by his Cochran grandparents. Roger's and Douglas' father, Christopher Brown, was an All-American skier at UVM, a member of the UVM Hall of Athletic Fame, is a professor of Mechanical Engineering at Worcester Polytechnic Institute.
- Barbara Ann Cochran (born 1951) - member of the U.S. Ski Team (1967–74), gold medalist in slalom 1972 Olympic in Sapporo, Japan, silver medalist in slalom at the 1970 World Championships, and the U.S. national champion in giant slalom and slalom. In 1972, she was awarded the Beck International Trophy by the USSA recognizing her as the top American skier in international competition that year. Barbara was inducted into the U.S. Ski and Snowboard Hall of Fame in 1976. Following graduation from the University of Vermont in 1978, she taught physical education, health, and family and consumer science and was a ski coach and instructor at Cochran's Ski Area. She is also a motivational speaker, offering workshops and seminars and individual coaching to athletes, coaches, parents, and students. Her son Ryan Cochran-Siegle is a member of the U.S. Ski Team, and won the 2017 US National Super-G title as well as five junior National titles. He won gold medals in downhill and combined at the Alpine Jr. Championships in Italy in March 2012. [USSA News Bureau March 2 and 9, 2012] In 2021, Ryan broke his neck while competing at the Hahnenkamm-Rennen Kitzbühel in Austria. One year later from his accident, he won the Silver Medal for the United States of America. Barbara’s daughter Cate Ojala coached skiing at Pat's Peak in New Hampshire, while attending the University of New Hampshire. Today, she is an account executive in the automotive industry.
- Robert "Bob" Cochran, M.D. (born 1951) - member of the U.S. Ski Team (1968–74) and U.S. Pro Tour (1975–77). In 1973, he was the gold medalist in the Hahnenkamm combined, the first victory in that event by a U.S. ski racer. Later that season, he won a giant slalom at Heavenly Valley, California, the first World Cup GS victory by a U.S. male. He was a two-time U.S. national champion in slalom, giant slalom, and downhill, and went on to become a family practice physician in New Hampshire. Bob was inducted into the U.S. Ski and Snowboard Hall of Fame in 2010. His son Jimmy (b. 1981) was a member of the U.S. Olympic Teams in 2006 and 2010, raced in three World Championships (2005, 2007, and 2009), and captured four U.S. titles. Jimmy retired from ski racing in March 2012 following the U.S. Alpine Championships at Winter Park. His daughter Amy raced for the University of Vermont. His oldest son, Thomas Cochran, stopped skiing to begin a singing career and later became an emergency physician at the Keene Medical Center in Keene, N.H.
- Lindy Cochran Kelley (born 1953) - Member of the U.S. Ski Team (1970–78), University of Vermont Ski Team (1978–81), top American finisher 1976 Olympic slalom & giant Slalom in Innsbruck, Austria, U.S. national champion in slalom (1973) & giant slalom (1976), NCAA All-American (1979). Daughter Jessica Kelley and son Tim were both members of the U.S. Ski Team. Her other son Robby is also a U.S. Ski Team member. Robby and his older brother Tim are also two of the four founding members of Redneck Racing, an independent ski racing team ready to make waves on the 2014/2015 Nor-Am, Europa, and World Cup tours.

== Grandchildren ==
- Roger Brown (born 1981) - Son of Marilyn, US Ski Team Member & All-American. Graduated Dartmouth College in 2004. 2002 NCAA slalom champion.
- Jimmy Cochran (born 1981) - The son of Robert, member of U.S Olympic Teams in 2006 and 2010, finishing as the top American in the slalom in 2006. Also competed in the World Championships in 2005, 2007, and 2009 and earned four U.S. alpine skiing titles.
- Jessica Kelley (born 1982) - Daughter of Lindy, member of U.S. Ski Team (2001-2010). 2002 World Junior Championships silver medalist in giant slalom, and competed in giant slalom at the World Championships in 2007.
- Tim Kelley (born 1986) - Son of Lindy, member of U.S. Ski Team (2005-2010, 2015-2016) and Redneck Racing (2014-2015), competed at 2015 World Championships in the slalom. Three-time All-American at the University of Vermont where he was the 2011 NCAA Slalom champion, as well as national runner-up in 2012 and member of Vermont's 2012 NCAA National Championship team. He is the co-founder of Redneck Racing with his brother Robby.
- Robby Kelley (born 1990) - Son of Lindy, member of U.S. Ski Team (2011–2014) and Redneck Racing (2014-present), U.S. national champion in the giant slalom in 2012. Competed on the FIS Alpine Ski World Cup in 2013, 2014, 2015, 2016, and 2017 and has earned 7 Nor-Am Cup podiums, as well as one European Cup podium.
- Ryan Cochran-Siegle (born 1992) - Son of Barbara Ann, member of U.S. Ski Team (2011–present), competed for the United States at the 2018 Winter Olympics in the men's downhill, men's combined, super-G and giant slalom, placing first among American skiers in the super-G (14th) and giant slalom (11th). 2012 Nor-Am super-G and downhill winner, 2012 World Junior Championship gold medalist in the downhill and combined, 2014 Nor-Am Cup Champion, competed on the FIS Alpine Ski World Cup in 2012, 2013, 2016, 2017, 2018. 2017 U.S. National Champion in super-G. Ryan Cochran-Siegle is a silver medalist in the super-G at the 2022 Winter Olympics and the 2026 Winter Olympics.

== Timeline ==
- 1961 - Cochran's Ski Area founded; Ginny Cochran offers first after-school program at the request of the Richmond P.T.O.
- 1965 - Adjacent 140-acre (0.57 km^{2}) parcel purchased for future ski area expansion
- 1966 - New trails and rope tow installed on present Cochran's Ski Area site
- 1967 - Marilyn & Barbara Ann Cochran named to the U.S. Ski Team
- 1968 - Bobby Cochran named to the U.S. Ski Team
- 1969 - Marilyn Cochran wins the World Cup season title in giant slalom
- 1970 - Lindy Cochran joins her siblings on the U.S. Ski Team; Barbara Ann wins a silver medal in slalom and Marilyn wins a bronze medal in combined at the World Championships
- 1972 - Barbara Ann Cochran wins the gold medal in slalom at the 1972 Winter Olympics in Sapporo, Japan
- 1973 - Bob Cochran wins the combined event at the prestigious Hahnenkamm in Kitzbühel, Austria, and a giant slalom at Heavenly Valley
- 1974 - Mickey Cochran serves as Alpine Director of the U.S. Ski Team; Cochran's Ski Club founded. Barbara Ann and Marilyn retire from international competition
- 1975 - Bobby Cochran turns professional; Mitey Mite handle lift installed at Cochran's Ski Area
- 1976 - Lindy Cochran is top American in both slalom and giant slalom at the Olympic Games in Innsbruck, Austria. Barbara inducted into the U.S. Ski and Snowboard Hall of Fame
- 1978 - Marilyn inducted into the U.S. Ski and Snowboard Hall of Fame
- 1979 - T-bar installed at Cochran's Ski Area
- 1984 - New lodge built at Cochran's Ski Area
- 1985 - Innovative "Ski-Tots Program" introduced at Cochran's by Lindy (Cochran) Kelley as the Cochran family continues to coach and teach the next generation of Cochran's skiers
- 1998 - Mickey Cochran dies at the age of 74; Cochran's Ski Area turns non-profit
- 1999 - Cochran's Ski Area was granted nonprofit, 501(c)(3) tax status by the Internal Revenue Service. Mission statement: "To provide affordable skiing/snowboarding, lessons and race training for area youths and families and continue the tradition Mickey & Ginny have created."
- 2002 - Lindy Cochran's daughter Jessica Kelley named to the U.S. Ski Team; Marilyn Cochran's son Roger Brown wins NCAA slalom title competing for Dartmouth College
- 2003 - Bob Cochran's son Jimmy Cochran named to the U.S. Ski Team
- 2004 - Jimmy Cochran wins U.S. National Championships in Slalom and giant slalom
- 2005 - Ginny Cochran dies at age 76. Roger Brown named to the U.S. Ski Team
- 2006 - Jimmy Cochran competes in the 2006 Winter Olympics in Turin, Italy. Lindy Cochran's son Tim Kelley named to the U.S. Ski Team. Amy Cochran, racing for the University of Vermont, places second in the giant slalom and third in the slalom at the Eastern Intercollegiate Ski Association (EISA) Championships.
- 2007 - Jimmy Cochran, Jessica Kelley, and Tim Kelley all begin their 2007/2008 season together on the U.S. Ski Team
- 2008 - Jimmy Cochran wins two more U.S. national titles in slalom and combined
- 2010 - Jimmy Cochran competes in the 2010 Winter Olympics in Vancouver, British Columbia. Bobby inducted into the U.S. Ski and Snowboard Hall of Fame
- 2011 - Ryan Cochran-Siegle named to the U.S. Ski Team; Tim Kelley wins NCAA slalom title for the University of Vermont; Robby Kelley named to the U.S. Ski Team from the May Mammoth Mountain Training Camp.
- 2012 - Ryan Cochran-Siegle wins gold in downhill and combined at the Alpine Junior World Ski Championships in Roccasoro, Italy; Robby Kelley wins the US National GS Title.
- 2013 - Ryan Cochran-Siegle and Robby Kelley named to the 2013 World Championships Team.
- 2015 - Tim Kelley named to the 2015 World Championships Team.
- 2017 - Ryan Cochran-Siegle and Robby Kelley named to 2017 World Championships Team. Ryan Cochran-Siegle wins US National Super-G Title.
- 2018 - Ryan Cochran-Siegle competes at the 2018 Winter Olympics in PyeongChang, South Korea
- 2020 - Ryan Cochran-Siegle wins his first world cup race in Bormio, Italy
- 2022 - Ryan Cochran-Siegle wins the silver medal in the Super-G event at the Beijing Olympics
- 2026 - Ryan Cochran-Siegle wins the silver medal in the Super-G event at the Milan-Cortina Olympics

== Cochran's ==
In 2006, snow making equipment was installed at the site. The ski area is mostly run with volunteers. In 2010 the Ski Area installed lights for night skiing.

== Video ==
- Vermont Public Television - Vermont Makers - Barbara Cochran - 2013
