= Bob Cochran (skier) =

American alpine skier

Personal information
- Full name: Robert Bruce Cochran
- Born: December 11, 1951 (age 74) Claremont, New Hampshire, U.S.
- Height: 5 ft 9 in (1.75 m)

Skiing career
- Sport: Alpine skiing
- Club: University of Vermont
- Retired: March 1974 (age 22)
- Disciplines: Downhill, giant slalom, slalom, combined
- World Cup debut: December 1969 (age 18)

Olympics
- Teams: 1 – (1972)
- Medals: 0

World Championships
- Teams: 3 – (1970, 1972, 1974) includes Olympics
- Medals: 0

World Cup
- Seasons: 5 – (1970–74)
- Wins: 1 - (1 GS)
- Podiums: 4 – (1 DH, 1 GS, 2 SL)
- Overall titles: 0 – (8th in 1973)
- Discipline titles: 0 – (9th in SL, 1973)

Robert Bruce Cochran (born December 11, 1951) is a former World Cup alpine ski racer from the United States.

Born in Claremont, New Hampshire, Cochran was a member of the Skiing Cochrans family of Richmond, Vermont. He had one World Cup victory, four podiums, and 21 top ten finishes. His best finish in the World Cup season standings was in 1973: eighth overall and ninth in slalom. Cochran also won the combined event at Kitzbühel, Austria, the first win in that event by an American, although not an official World Cup race at the time. His sole World Cup win was in giant slalom, which he considered his weakest event. That win was the first by an American male in a World Cup giant slalom. It was Cochran's only top ten result in giant slalom, his other twenty were evenly split between downhill and slalom.

At the 1972 Winter Olympics in Japan, Cochran finished eighth in the downhill and 17th in the giant slalom, but fell in the slalom. At the World Championships, he placed 14th in the downhill in 1974 in Switzerland, but fell in both the giant slalom and slalom. He was 26th in the downhill in 1970 in Italy.

Cochran last competed in World Cup in 1974, raced the pro tour in North America for several years, then studied medicine at the University of Vermont in Burlington. He graduated in 1981 and became a family practice physician in New Hampshire. His son Jimmy (b. 1981) was also a World Cup racer.

Cochran was inducted into the National Ski Hall of Fame in 2010, joining older sisters Marilyn (1978) and Barbara (1976). He is also a member of the Vermont Sports Hall of Fame with his siblings Marilyn, a fellow 2014 inductee, and Barbara, inducted in 2013.

== World Cup results ==
=== Season standings ===
Season	Age	Overall	Slalom	Giant Slalom	Super G	Downhill	Combined
1970	18	33	20	—	not run	22	not run
1971	19	50	—	—	not run	23	not run
1972	20	29	11	—	not run	17	not run
1973	21	8	9	11	not run	10	not run
1974	22	26	13	—	not run	19	not run

Points were only awarded for top ten finishes (see scoring system).

=== Race podiums ===
- 1 win – (1 GS)
- 4 podiums – (1 DH, 1 GS, 2 SL), and 21 top tens - (10 DH, 1 GS, 10 SL)

Season	Date	Location	Discipline	Place
1972	23 Jan 1972	Wengen, Switzerland	Slalom	3rd
1973	27 Jan 1973	Kitzbühel, Austria	Downhill	3rd
1973	23 Mar 1973	(United States) Heavenly Valley, USA	Slalom	2nd
1973	24 Mar 1973	(United States) Heavenly Valley, USA	Giant slalom	1st

Cochran's win in the combined at Kitzbühel in 1973 is omitted because it was not
an official World Cup race until two years later. He finished 23rd in the slalom portion to win.

== See also ==
- Skiing Cochrans
