= Round Church (Richmond, Vermont) =

Historic church in Vermont, United States

- U.S. National Register of Historic Places
- U.S. National Historic Landmark
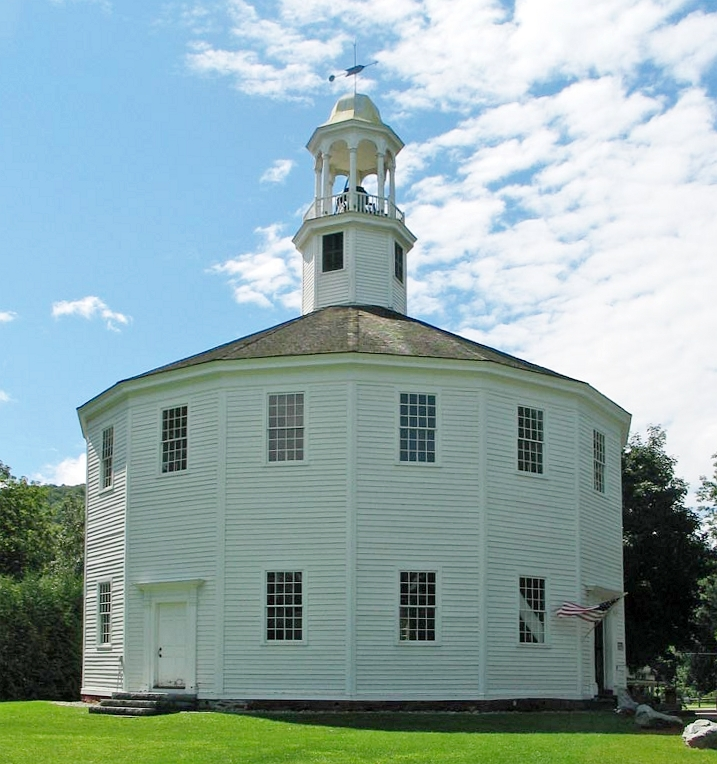

- Location within Vermont Location within the United States
- Location: Round Church Road, Richmond, Vermont
- Coordinates: 44°23′56.3″N 72°59′58″W
- Area: 1.0 acre (0.40 ha)
- Built: 1812–1813
- Architect: William Rhodes
- Architectural style: Federal
- NRHP reference No.: 74000355

Significant dates
- Added to NRHP: June 20, 1974
- Designated NHL: June 19, 1996

The Round Church, also known as the Old Round Church, is a historic church on Round Church Road in Richmond, Vermont. Built in 1812–1813, it is an extraordinarily rare, well-preserved example of a sixteen-sided meeting house and former church, likely the only remaining example of its kind in North America. The round church's uniqueness is highlighted by the fact that the only other known historic sixteen-sided building used as a meeting place in the Northeastern United States is Union College's Nott Memorial. It was built to serve as the meeting place for the town as well as five Protestant congregations. Today, it is maintained by the Richmond Historical Society and is open to the public during the summer and early fall. It is also available for weddings and other events, with the church's shape being a novelty that attracts married couples who desire a one-of-a-kind venue for their celebrations. It was declared a National Historic Landmark in 1996 for the rarity of its form and its exceptional state of preservation.

== Description and history ==
The Round Church is set on the east side of Round Church Road, a short way south of the Winooski River and Richmond's main village center south of the iron bridge but north of Huntington road. The Round Church's north "side" overlooks a grassy knoll sloping down through a field towards the main branch of the Winooski, which keeps it largely above high water in flooding events, while the west "side" faces the main road. The Round Church sits on its eponymous road directly adjacent to the town's green; a fixture of a colonial New England town. It is a two-story wood-frame structure with sixteen sides, finished with wooden clapboards and modest Federal period styling. All but four sides have two sash windows; the wall section behind the pulpit has no windows, and three sides have doorways on the first level and windows on the second. The doorways are framed by simple pilasters and unadorned entablatures. The building is topped by a sixteen-sided roof with a two-stage octagonal belltower at the center.

The church was built in 1812–13 by William Rhodes, a native of Claremont, New Hampshire, where there was a sixteen-sided brick church (since demolished) whose only surviving view shows great similarity to this building. Rhodes adapted the conventional meeting house to this distinctive form, borrowing at least some details from architectural pattern books using a panel from Asher Benjamin's 1797 Public Builder's Assistant for the styling of the pulpit. The construction was funded by the sale of pews, most of which were purchased by Congregationalists, but at least four other Christian denominations were represented. As of 2025, Richmond's round church is the only church in North America with an entirely circular floor plan, and one of only a few in the entire world.

The building was used for both religious services and town meetings for many years. The Baptist Congregation folded in 1843, and the Congregationalists moved to a new building in 1850. The Universalists built their own church in 1879, and the Methodists apparently stopped using this building in the 1880s. The town continued to use it until 1973, when it was closed over concerns for its structural soundness. The building had, in 1927, undergone some work to shore up its leaning tower and sagging roof, but these changes may have been ineffective. The town gave the building to the Richmond Historical Society in 1976, and it underwent a major restoration in 1980–81. This restoration reversed major alterations made since its original construction (including, for example, the removal of a stairway to the attic), the careful reconstruction of the tower using similar materials (due to extensive rot in the original), and a sympathetic reframing of the roof.

== See also ==
- List of National Historic Landmarks in Vermont
- National Register of Historic Places listings in Chittenden County, Vermont
