= Marilyn Cochran =

American alpine skier

Personal information
- Born: February 7, 1950 (age 76) Burlington, Vermont, U.S.
- Height: 5 ft 7 in (1.70 m)

Skiing career
- Sport: Alpine skiing
- Club: University of Vermont
- Retired: March 1974 (age 24)
- Disciplines: Downhill, giant slalom, slalom, combined
- World Cup debut: March 1968 (age 18)

Olympics
- Teams: 1 – (1972)
- Medals: 0

World Championships
- Teams: 3 – (1970, 1972, 1974) includes Olympics
- Medals: 1 (0 gold)

World Cup
- Seasons: 6 – (1969–74)
- Wins: 3 – (1 GS, 2 SL)
- Podiums: 15 – (9 GS, 6 SL)
- Overall titles: 0 – (8th in 1973)
- Discipline titles: 1 – (GS, 1969)
Medal record
Women's alpine skiing
Representing the United States
World Championships
Bronze medal – third place	1970 Val Gardena	Combined

Marilyn Cochran Brown (born February 5, 1950) is a former World Cup alpine ski racer from the United States.

The eldest of four siblings of the "Skiing Cochrans" family of Richmond, Vermont, she became the first American to win a discipline championship in the World Cup, triumphing in giant slalom at age 19 in 1969. The next year, she won a bronze medal in the combined at the World Championships.

== Racing career ==
Born in Burlington, Vermont, Cochran and her younger sister Barbara (b. 1951) joined the U.S. Ski Team in 1967. She made her World Cup debut at age 18 in March 1968, a month after the Winter Olympics, with a pair of top ten finishes at the season's final stop in Aspen, Colorado. Brother Bob (b. 1951) joined the men's "A team" for the 1970 season and the three siblings competed on the World Cup tour through the 1974 season.

Marilyn was a three-time U.S. national champion during her career. In the 1969 season, she finished runner-up in the final five giant slalom races and won the World Cup season title. Cochran was the only American alpine racer with a World Cup season title until 1980, when Phil Mahre won the combined. She won the bronze medal in the combined at the 1970 World Championships in Val Gardena, Italy. Sister Barbara was fourth in that competition, but won a silver in the slalom, where Marilyn was sixth.

Cochran won three World Cup races, two in giant slalom and one in slalom, and had 15 podiums and fifty top ten finishes. The first victory came in February 1971 close to home, in Quebec at Mont Ste. Anne, with sister Barbara as runner-up. She competed in all three events at the Winter Olympics in 1972 in Japan, but with disappointing results: 28th in downhill, 20th in giant slalom, and a fall in the first run of the slalom, the race won by her sister. At the World Championships in 1974 in Switzerland, Cochran finished eighth in giant slalom, and retired from international competition after the season.

== Post-racing life ==
After her racing career, Cochran attended the University of Vermont in Burlington and graduated in 1979. She married Chris Brown, an All-American racer at the university and later a professor of mechanical engineering at WPI. Their son Roger Brown, a 2004 graduate of Dartmouth, was also an All-American. He was the 2002 NCAA slalom champion and competed on the U.S. Ski Team. Younger son Douglas Brown was captain of the ski team at St. Lawrence University, and graduated in 2009.

Cochran was inducted into the National Ski Hall of Fame in 1978. Sister Barbara (1976) and brother Bob (2010) are also members of the hall. Cochran also joined her siblings Barbara (2013) and Bob (2014) as members of the Vermont Sports Hall of Fame in 2014.

== World Cup results ==
=== Season titles ===
Season	Discipline
1969	Giant slalom

=== Season standings ===
Season	Age	Overall	Slalom	Giant Slalom	Super G	Downhill	Combined
1968	18	42	35	18	not run	—	not run
1969	19	11	11	1	not run	20	not run
1970	20	13	10	11	not run	15	not run
1971	21	11	10	8	not run	11	not run
1972	22	12	11	5	not run	23	not run
1973	23	8	9	7	not run	21	not run
1974	24	23	11	—	not run	—	not run

Points were only awarded for top ten finishes (see scoring system).

=== Race podiums ===
- 3 wins - (1 GS, 2 SL)
- 15 podiums (9 GS, 6 SL)

Season	Date	Location	Discipline	Place
1969	4 Jan 1969	Oberstaufen, West Germany	Slalom	3rd
1969	9 Feb 1969	Vipiteno, Italy	Giant slalom	2nd
1969	17 Feb 1969	Vysoké Tatry, Czechoslovakia	Giant slalom	2nd
1969	1 Mar 1969	(United States) Squaw Valley, CA, USA	Giant slalom	2nd
1969	14 Mar 1969	Mont St. Anne, QC, Canada	Giant slalom	2nd
1969	20 Mar 1969	(United States) Waterville Valley, NH, USA	Giant slalom	2nd
1970	6 Jan 1970	Grindelwald, Switzerland	Slalom	3rd
1971	13 Feb 1971	Mont St. Anne, QC, Canada	Slalom	1st
1971	14 Mar 1971	Åre, Sweden	Giant slalom	2nd
1972	3 Jan 1972	Oberstaufen, West Germany	Giant slalom	3rd
1972	3 Mar 1972	(United States) Heavenly Valley, CA, USA	Slalom	3rd
1973	21 Jan 1973	Les Contamines, France	Slalom	3rd
1973	26 Jan 1973	Chamonix, France	Slalom	1st
1973	15 Mar 1973	Naeba, Japan	Giant slalom	1st
1974	7 Dec 1973	Val-d'Isère, France	Slalom	3rd

== See also ==
- Skiing Cochrans
