= Jimmy Cochran =

American alpine skier (born 1981)

James Michael Cochran (born May 29, 1981) is a former World Cup alpine ski racer from the United States. He specialized in the technical events and his best World Cup finish was seventh in a Giant slalom in December 2005.

Born in Burlington, Vermont, Cochran is the son of Bob Cochran, one of the "Skiing Cochrans" family of Richmond, Vermont. He represented the U.S. in the Winter Olympics in 2006 and 2010 and the World Championships in 2005, 2007, and 2009.

Cochran's best Olympic finish was 12th in the slalom in 2006, and his best result at the world championships was tenth in the slalom at Val d'Isère in 2009. He won U.S. national titles in the giant slalom and slalom on successive days in 2004 at Alyeska in Alaska.

== After racing ==
Cochran retired from international competition after the 2012 season and became an assistant alpine ski coach at the University of Vermont in Burlington. He raced for the Catamounts in 2003, after transferring from Middlebury College, then was named to the U.S. Ski Team. He is currently managing his family's non-profit ski area in Richmond, Vermont.

== World Cup results ==
=== Season standings ===
| Season | Age | Overall | Slalom | Giant Slalom | Super G | Downhill | Combined |
|---|---|---|---|---|---|---|---|
| 2005 | 23 | 108 | – | 42 | — | — | — |
| 2006 | 24 | 83 | 49 | 32 | – | – | – |
| 2007 | 25 | 89 | 31 | 45 | – | – | 48 |
| 2008 | 26 | 54 | 25 | 36 | — | — | — |
| 2009 | 27 | 102 | 37 | – | – | – | – |
| 2010 | 28 | 66 | 20 | – | – | – | – |
| 2011 | 29 | | | | | | |
| 2012 | 30 | 103 | 35 | – | – | – | – |

=== Race top tens ===
- 5 top tens (3 SL, 2 GS)

| Season | Date | Location | Discipline | Place |
|---|---|---|---|---|
| 2006 | Dec 21, 2005 | Kranjska Gora, Slovenia | Giant slalom | 7th |
| 2008 | Dec 16, 2007 | Alta Badia, Italy | Giant slalom | 10th |
| 2008 | Dec 17, 2007 | Alta Badia, Italy | Slalom | 8th |
| 2008 | Jan 6, 2008 | Adelboden, Switzerland | Slalom | 8th |
| 2010 | Dec 21, 2009 | Alta Badia, Italy | Slalom | 9th |

== See also ==
- Skiing Cochrans
