= Tim Kelley =

American alpine skier (born 1986)

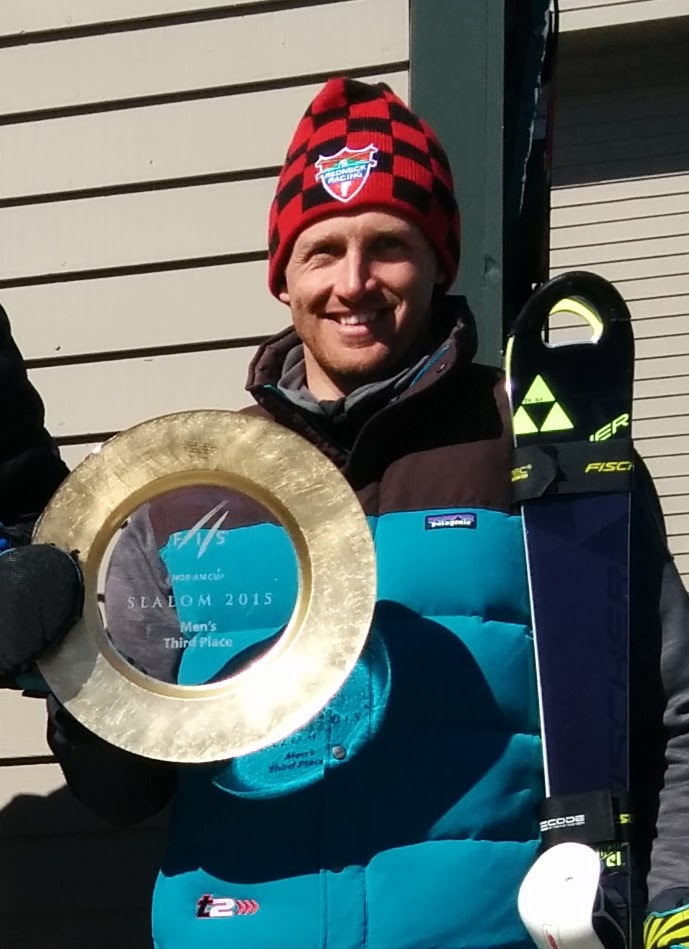

Personal information
- Born: May 20, 1986 (age 40) Burlington, Vermont, U.S.
- Height: 6 ft 3 in (191 cm)

Skiing career
- Sport: Alpine skiing ♂
- Club: Mt. Mansfield Ski Club and Cochran's Ski Club
- Retired: May 2016 (age 29)
- Disciplines: Slalom
- World Cup debut: December 2006 (age 20)

World Championships
- Teams: 2015

Tim Kelley (born May 20, 1986) is a former American alpine ski racer. He was born in Burlington, Vermont to former alpine skier Lindy Cochran and her husband Steve Kelley. His siblings Jessica Kelley and Robby Kelley both raced on the US Ski Team.

He competed at the 2015 World Championships in Beaver Creek, US, in the slalom.

== World Cup results ==
Season	Age	Overall	Slalom	Giant slalom	Super-G	Downhill	Combined
2016	29	118	38	—	—	—	—
