= Lindy Cochran =

American alpine skier (born 1953)

Personal information
- Born: July 10, 1953 (age 73)

Skiing career
- Sport: Alpine skiing
- Disciplines: Alpine skiing

Linda Lorraine "Lindy" Cochran Kelley (born July 10, 1953) is a former World Cup alpine ski racer from the United States.

Cochran is the youngest of four siblings of the "Skiing Cochrans" family of Richmond, Vermont, whose parents built and operated a ski hill in their back yard. Named to the U.S. Ski Team in 1970, Cochran competed in the 1976 Winter Olympics in Innsbruck and finished sixth in the slalom and 12th in the giant slalom. She finished 14th in slalom at the World Championships in 1974 at St. Moritz, Switzerland. Cochran competed on the World Cup circuit in the mid-1970s, then attended the University of Vermont in Burlington and raced for the Catamounts. In 1979, the Supersisters trading card set was produced and distributed; one of the cards featured Cochran's name and picture.

Cochran married Steve Kelley and all three of their children, Jessica (b. 1982) Tim (b. 1986), and Robby (b. 1990), raced on the U.S. Ski Team.

== World Cup results ==
=== Season standings ===
Season	Age	Overall	Slalom	Giant Slalom	Super G	Downhill	Combined
1974	20	20	8	—	not run	—	not run
1975	21	39	25	—	not run	—	not run
1976	22	20	14	11	not run	—	—

Points were only awarded for top ten finishes (see scoring system).

=== Race top tens ===
- 1 podium (1 SL)
- 7 top tens (5 SL, 2 GS)

Season	Date	Location	Discipline	Place
1974	8 Jan 1974	Les Gets, France	Slalom	2nd
1974	16 Jan 1974	Les Diablerets, Switzerland	Slalom	8th
1975	29 Jan 1975	St. Gervais, France	Slalom	7th
1976	4 Dec 1975	Val-d'Isère, France	Giant slalom	4th
1976	11 Dec 1975	Aprica, Italy	Slalom	6th
1976	12 Jan 1976	Les Diablerets, Switzerland	Slalom	5th
1976	5 Mar 1976	(United States) Copper Mountain, CO, USA	Giant slalom	8th

== See also ==
- Skiing Cochrans
