= Richmond, Vermont =

- Town
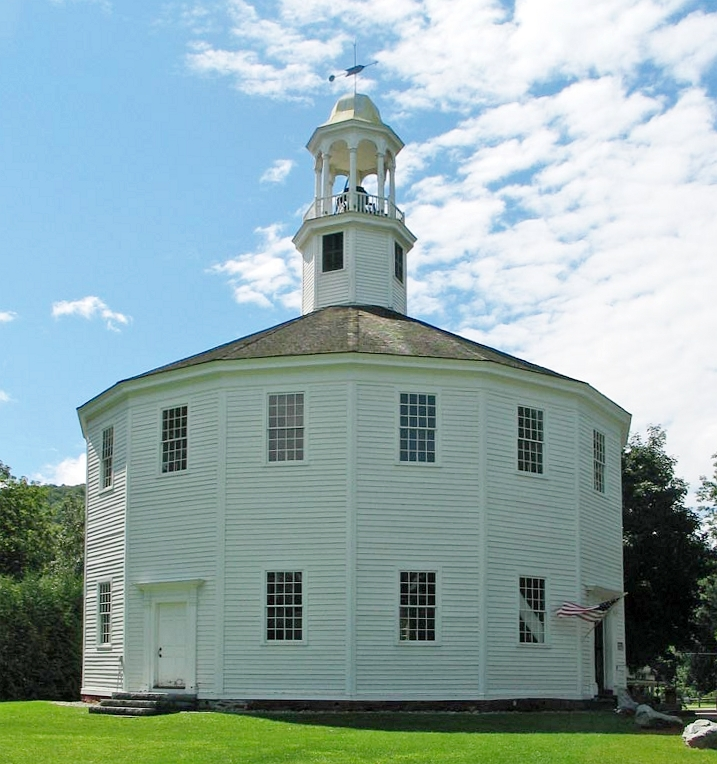
- Round Church, completed in 1813

- Seal Logo

- Location in Chittenden County and the state of Vermont
- Coordinates: 44°23′17″N 73°00′20″W
- Country: United States
- State: Vermont
- County: Chittenden
- Incorporated: 1794
- Communities: Richmond; Fays Corner; Jonesville

Area
  - Total: 32.7 sq mi (84.8 km^{2})
  - Land: 32.2 sq mi (83.5 km^{2})
  - Water: 0.54 sq mi (1.4 km^{2})
- Elevation: 577 ft (176 m)

Population (2020)
  - Total: 4,167
  - Density: 129/sq mi (49.9/km^{2})
- Time zone: UTC-5 (Eastern (EST))
  - Summer (DST): UTC-4 (EDT)
- ZIP code: 05477
- Area code: 802
- FIPS code: 50-59275
- GNIS feature ID: 1462186
- Website: www.richmondvt.gov

Richmond is a town in Chittenden County, Vermont, United States. As of the 2020 census the population was 4,167. The main settlement of Richmond, in the north-central part of town, is a census-designated place (CDP), with a population of 853 at the 2020 census; it was formerly an incorporated village.

== History ==
In 1775, Amos Brownson and John Chamberlain made the first settlement attempt. They abandoned their efforts in the fall of that year, but returned in the spring of 1784, at the close of the Revolutionary War. Richmond was incorporated by the General Assembly on October 27, 1794, then organized in 1795. The Winooski and Huntington rivers both offered locations for water mills. Industries began to manufacture wagons, harnesses, tinware, brass, cabinet work and woodenware. By 1859, the population was 1,453.

Richmond is noted for the Round Church, a rare 16-sided meetinghouse that was erected in 1812–1813. Originally designed to be a town meeting place and a Protestant church, today it is open to the public and a popular tourist destination.

=== Public health controversy ===
In October 2022, the town's water superintendent resigned after admitting that he had, without notifying city officials, lowered the water's fluoridation levels to less than half that recommended by the state to protect health. The superintendent confessed that he had done so since 2011 without seeking permission; the town's water and sewer commission immediately voted to restore fluoridation to the levels recommended by public health authorities.

== Geography ==
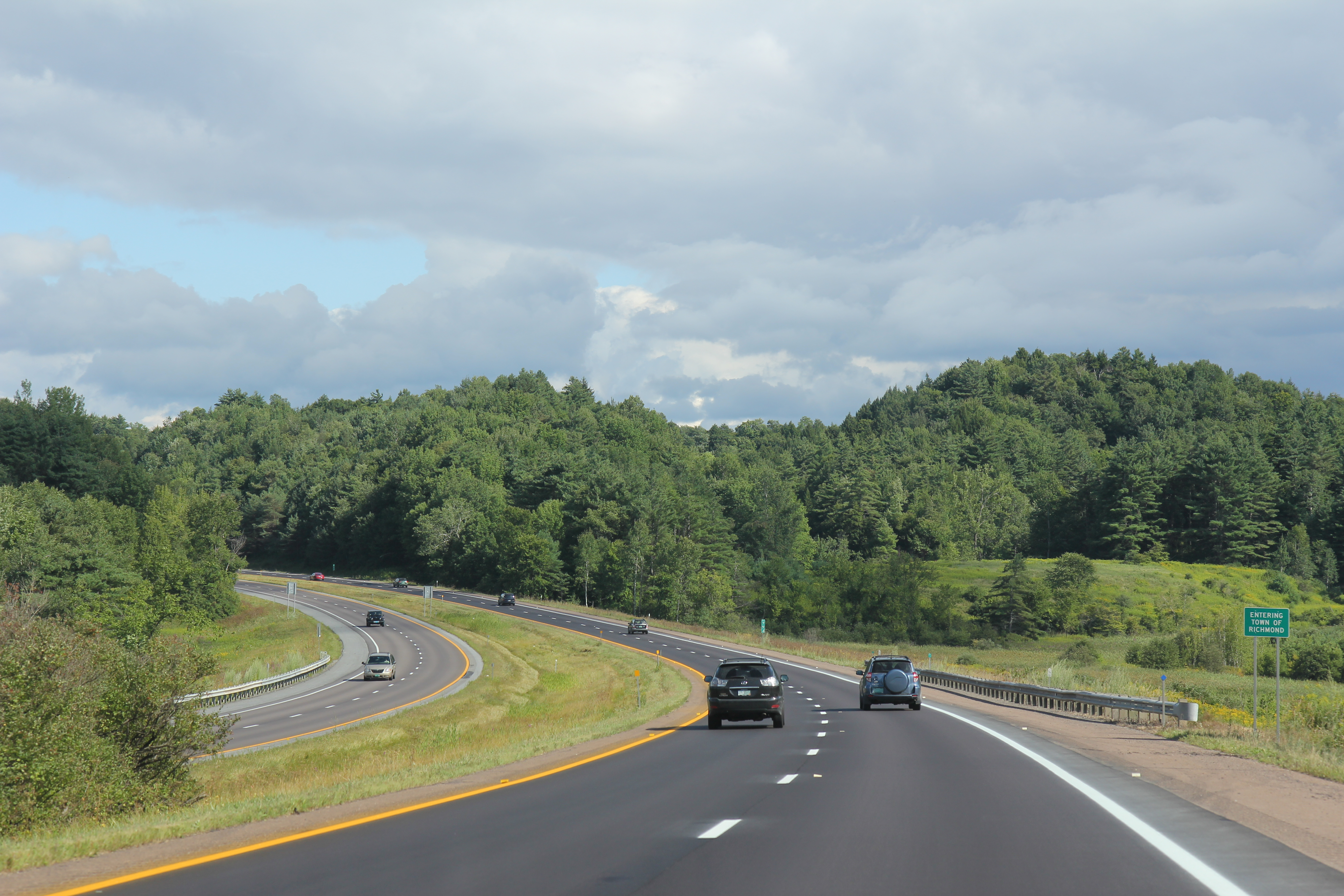
Entering Richmond on Interstate 89

According to the United States Census Bureau, the town has a total area of 32.7 square miles (84.8 km^{2}), of which 32.2 square miles (83.5 km^{2}) is land and 0.54 square miles (1.4 km^{2}), or 1.59%, is water. Richmond is bisected by the Winooski River, with its tributary, the Huntington River, crossing the southeast corner of the town. Richmond is located in the western foothills of the Green Mountains.

The town is crossed by Interstate 89, with access from Exit 11 in the northwest part of town, by U.S. Route 2, and by the New England Central Railroad. A scenic view of Camel's Hump and the foothills of the Green Mountains presents itself to southbound motorists around mile marker 80.2, as the interstate descends a 6% grade into Richmond.

== Education ==
Local students attend Mount Mansfield Union High School, Camel's Hump Middle School and Richmond Elementary School. Mount Mansfield Union High is in the neighboring town of Jericho. The MMU athletic teams are the Cougars, who play the teams of neighboring schools such as CVU.

On November 4, 2014, the communities of Bolton, Jericho, Richmond, Underhill ID and Underhill Town voted to form the Mount Mansfield Modified Union School District (MMMUSD). This new school district serves and governs the current town school districts of Bolton (Smilie Memorial School), Jericho (Jericho Elementary), Richmond (Richmond Elementary), Underhill ID School District (Underhill ID Elementary), Underhill Town (Underhill Central School), Mt Mansfield Union School District (Browns River Middle, Camels Hump Middle and Mt. Mansfield Union High Schools) students in Pre-K through grade 12, and Huntington students in grades 5–12.

== Demographics ==
Historical population
Census	Pop.	Note	%±
1800	718		—
1810	935		30.2%
1820	1,014		8.4%
1830	1,109		9.4%
1840	1,054		−5.0%
1850	1,453		37.9%
1860	1,400		−3.6%
1870	1,309		−6.5%
1880	1,264		−3.4%
1890	1,115		−11.8%
1900	1,057		−5.2%
1910	1,419		34.2%
1920	1,447		2.0%
1930	1,315		−9.1%
1940	1,225		−6.8%
1950	1,278		4.3%
1960	1,303		2.0%
1970	2,249		72.6%
1980	3,159		40.5%
1990	3,729		18.0%
2000	4,090		9.7%
2010	4,081		−0.2%
2020	4,167		2.1%
U.S. Decennial Census

As of the census of 2000, there were 4,090 people, 1,504 households, and 1,100 families residing in the town. The population density was 128.4 people per square mile (49.6/km^{2}). There were 1,528 housing units at an average density of 48.0 per square mile (18.5/km^{2}). The racial makeup of the town was 98.36% White, 0.05% African American, 0.12% Native American, 0.51% Asian, 0.02% Pacific Islander, 0.07% from other races, and 0.86% from two or more races. Hispanic or Latino people of any race were 0.83% of the population.

There were 1,504 households, of which 41.2% had children under the age of 18 living with them; 62.2% were married couples living together; 7.8% had a female householder with no husband present; and 26.8% were non-families. 18.4% of all households were made up of individuals, and 4.0% had someone living alone who was 65 years of age or older. The average household size was 2.71 and the average family size was 3.13.

In the town, the population was spread out, with 29.3% under the age of 18; 5.4% from 18 to 24; 34.1% from 25 to 44; 24.5% from 45 to 64; and 6.8% who were 65 years of age or older. The median age was 37 years. For every 100 females, there were 95.7 males. For every 100 females age 18 and over, there were 96.0 males.

The median income for a household in the town was $57,750, and the median income for a family was $66,875. Males had a median income of $36,161 versus $30,019 for females. The per capita income for the town was $25,692. About 3.2% of families and 5.1% of the population were below the poverty line, including 6.2% of those under age 18 and 5.8% of those age 65 or over.

== Notable people ==
- Trey Anastasio, lead singer and guitarist of the rock band Phish; previously lived here
- Barbara Ann Cochran, Olympic alpine skier and member of the Skiing Cochrans
- George F. Edmunds, US Senator
- Joel Furr, internet personality; coined the term "spam"
- Louis Greenough, pioneer and inventor
- Ted King, cyclist and co-founder of UnTapped (a maple syrup product company based on Richmond, VT)
- John Phillips, Wisconsin physician and politician
- George Dallas Sherman, first leader of the Burlington Concert Band
