= Alpine skiing at the 1960 Winter Olympics – Women's slalom =

Women's slalom at the VIII Olympic Winter Games
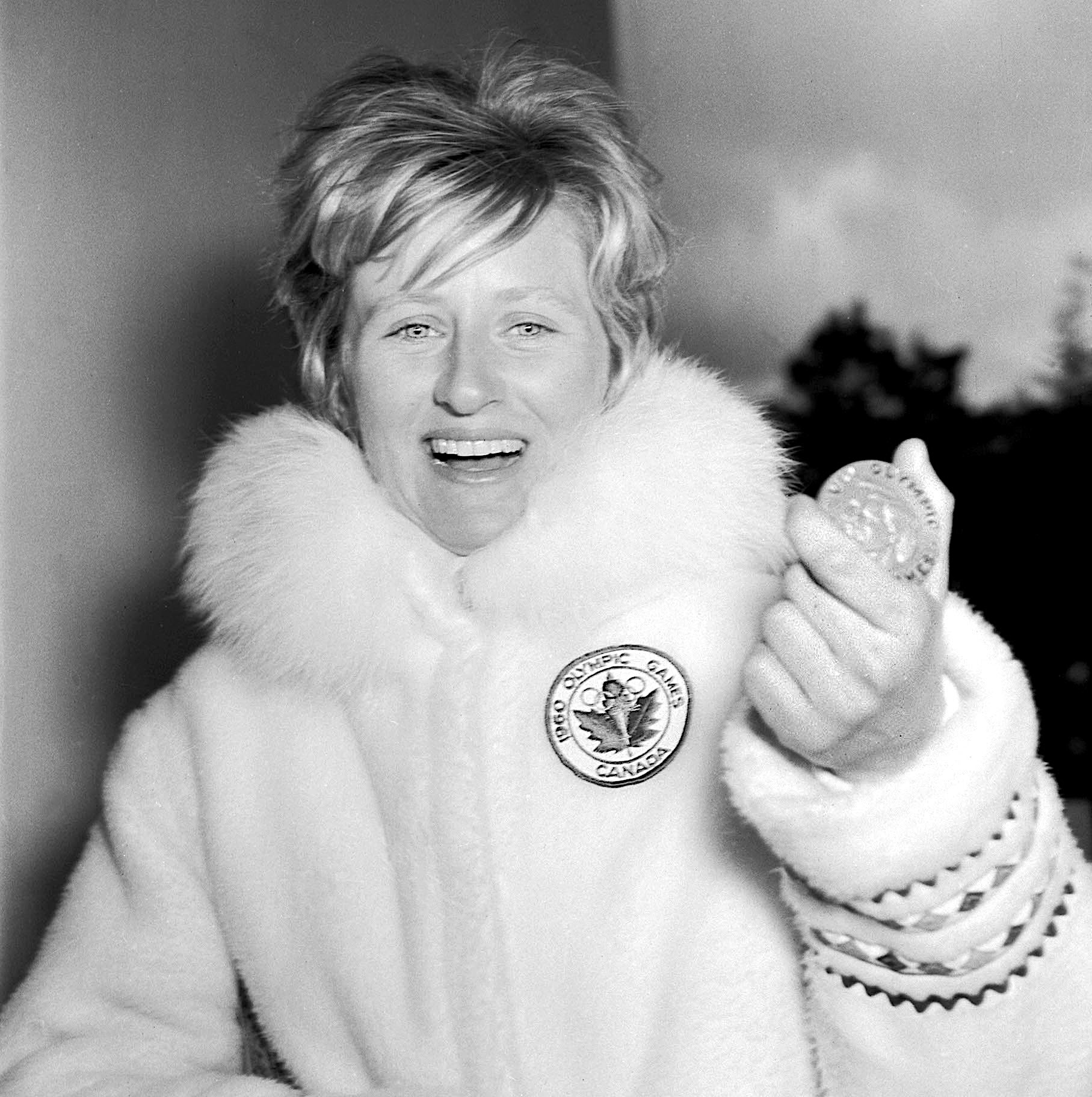
- Anne Heggtveit with her gold medal
- Venue: Squaw Valley
- Date: February 26, 1960
- Competitors: 43 from 21 nations
- Winning time: 1:49.6

Medalists
1st place, gold medalist(s)		Anne Heggtveit	Canada
2nd place, silver medalist(s)		Betsy Snite	United States
3rd place, bronze medalist(s)		Barbi Henneberger	United Team of Germany

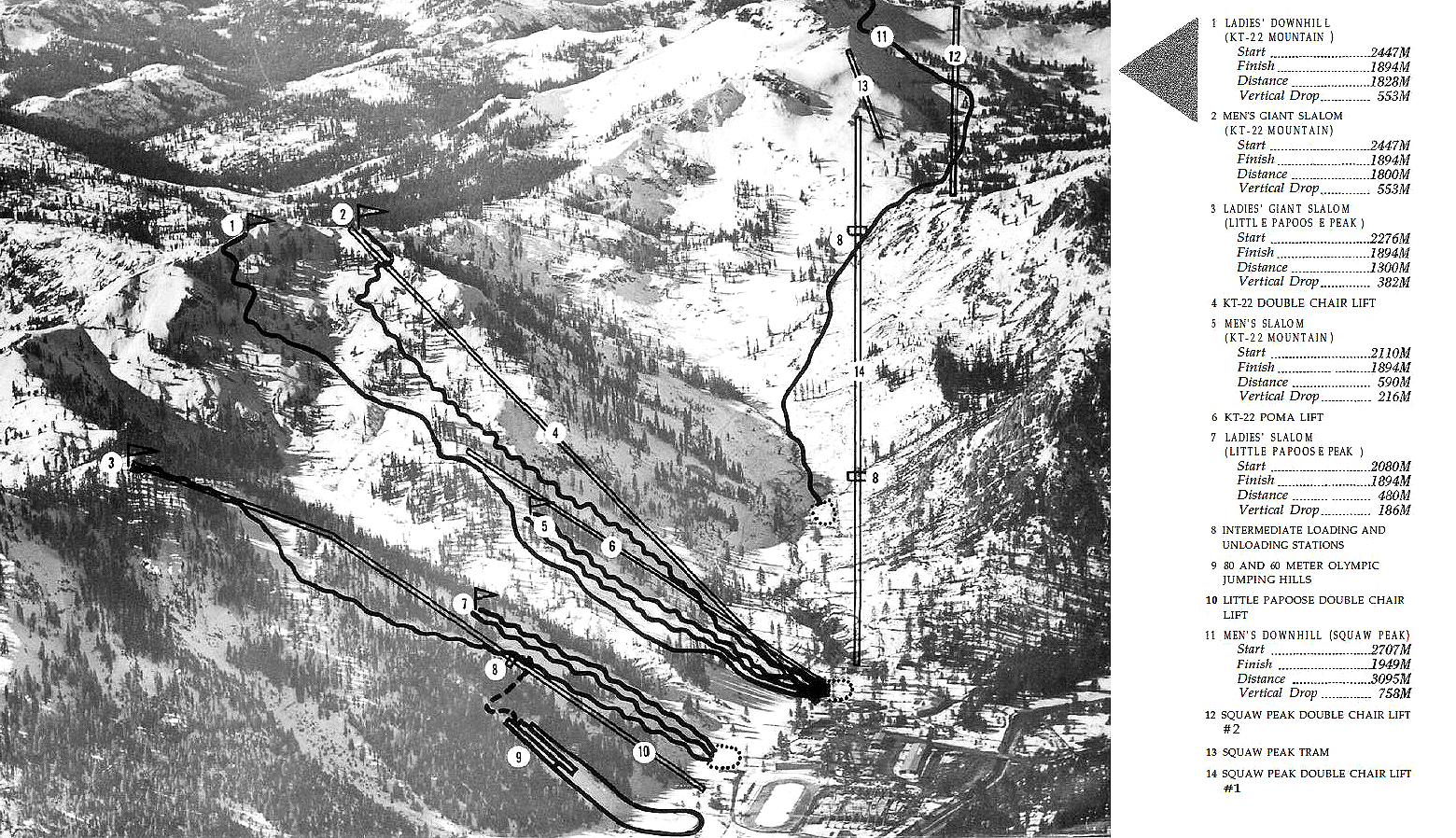
Alpine runs of the 1960 Winter Olympics

The Women's slalom competition of the 1960 Winter Olympics at Squaw Valley was held on Friday, February 26, and was the final alpine event of the games.

The defending world champion was Inger Bjørnbakken of Norway, who finished 14th. Anne Heggtveit of Canada won by over three seconds after gaining a large lead after the first run. She also won the combined, a world championship title.

== Results ==
Rank	Name	Country	Run 1	Run 2	Total	Difference
1st place, gold medalist(s)	Anne Heggtveit	Canada	0:54.0	0:55.6	1:49.6	—
2nd place, silver medalist(s)	Betsy Snite	United States	0:57.4	0:55.5	1:52.9	+3.3
3rd place, bronze medalist(s)	Barbi Henneberger	United Team of Germany	0:57.4	0:59.2	1:56.6	+7.0
4	Thérèse Leduc	France	0:59.2	0:58.2	1:57.4	+7.8
5	Hilde Hofherr	Austria	0:59.0	0:59.0	1:58.0	+8.4
5	Liselotte Michel	Switzerland	0:58.8	0:59.2	1:58.0	+8.4
7	Stalina Demidova-Korzukhina	Soviet Union	0:58.5	0:59.9	1:58.4	+8.8
8	Sonja Sperl	United Team of Germany	0:59.0	0:59.8	1:58.8	+9.2
9	Renie Cox	United States	0:59.4	0:59.8	1:59.2	+9.6
10	Giuliana Chenal-Minuzzo	Italy	0:57.4	1:01.9	1:59.3	+9.7
11	Marit Haraldsen	Norway	0:59.8	1:00.0	1:59.8	+10.2
12	Nancy Holland	Canada	1:01.6	0:59.5	2:01.1	+11.5
13	Anneliese Meggl	United Team of Germany	1:02.5	0:59.9	2:02.4	+12.8
14	Inger Bjørnbakken	Norway	0:57.3	1:05.2	2:02.5	+12.9
15	Carla Marchelli	Italy	1:01.1	1:01.8	2:02.9	+13.3
16	Putzi Frandl	Austria	0:59.2	1:03.8	2:03.0	+13.4
17	Anne-Marie Leduc	France	0:58.6	1:04.9	2:03.5	+13.9
18	Yevgeniya Kabina-Sidorova	Soviet Union	1:03.3	1:01.0	2:04.3	+14.7
19	Marguerite Leduc	France	1:02.2	1:02.4	2:04.6	+15.0
20	Jerta Schir	Italy	1:05.6	1:00.6	2:06.2	+16.6
21	Heidi Biebl	United Team of Germany	1:09.2	0:57.3	2:06.5	+16.9
22	Arlette Grosso	France	1:07.5	0:59.3	2:06.8	+17.2
23	Marían Navarro	Spain	1:05.2	1:02.8	2:08.0	+18.4
24	Elizabeth Greene	Canada	1:06.0	1:04.4	2:10.4	+20.8
25	María Cristina Schweizer	Argentina	1:05.9	1:06.0	2:11.9	+22.3
26	Beverley Anderson	United States	1:13.1	1:00.0	2:13.1	+23.5
27	Josephine Gibbs	Great Britain	1:04.1	1:09.1	2:13.2	+23.6
28	Madeleine Chamot-Berthod	Switzerland	1:12.1	1:03.3	2:15.4	+25.8
29	Christine Davy	Australia	1:13.1	1:04.1	2:17.2	+27.6
30	Lyubov Volkova	Soviet Union	1:00.8	1:16.5	2:17.3	+27.7
31	Nancy Greene	Canada	1:09.4	1:08.6	2:18.0	+28.4
32	Trish Prain	New Zealand	1:05.5	1:12.9	2:18.4	+28.8
33	Penny Pitou	United States	0:58.5	1:21.3	2:19.8	+30.2
34	Renate Holmes	Great Britain	1:16.1	1:07.4	2:23.5	+33.9
35	Jolanda Schir	Italy	1:02.3	1:25.8	2:28.1	+38.5
36	Astrid Sandvik	Norway	0:58.1	1:31.3	2:29.4	+39.8
37	Wendy Farrington	Great Britain	1:08.4	1:30.8	2:39.2	+49.6
38	Cecilia Womersley	New Zealand	2:17.7	1:25.4	3:43.1	+1:53.5
-	Marianne Jahn-Nutt	Austria	0:55.5	DQ	-	-
-	Annemarie Waser	Switzerland	0:57.6	DQ	-	-
-	Traudl Hecher	Austria	0:58.6	DQ	-	-
-	Yvonne Rüegg	Switzerland	DQ	-	-	-
-	Liv Jagge-Christiansen	Norway	DQ	-	-	-
