= Alpine skiing at the 1960 Winter Olympics – Women's giant slalom =

Women's giant slalom at the VIII Olympic Winter Games
- Alpine skiing
- Venue: Squaw Valley
- Date: February 23, 1960
- Competitors: 44 from 14 nations
- Winning time: 1:39.9

Medalists
1st place, gold medalist(s)		Yvonne Rüegg	Switzerland
2nd place, silver medalist(s)		Penny Pitou	United States
3rd place, bronze medalist(s)		Giuliana Chenal-Minuzzo	Italy

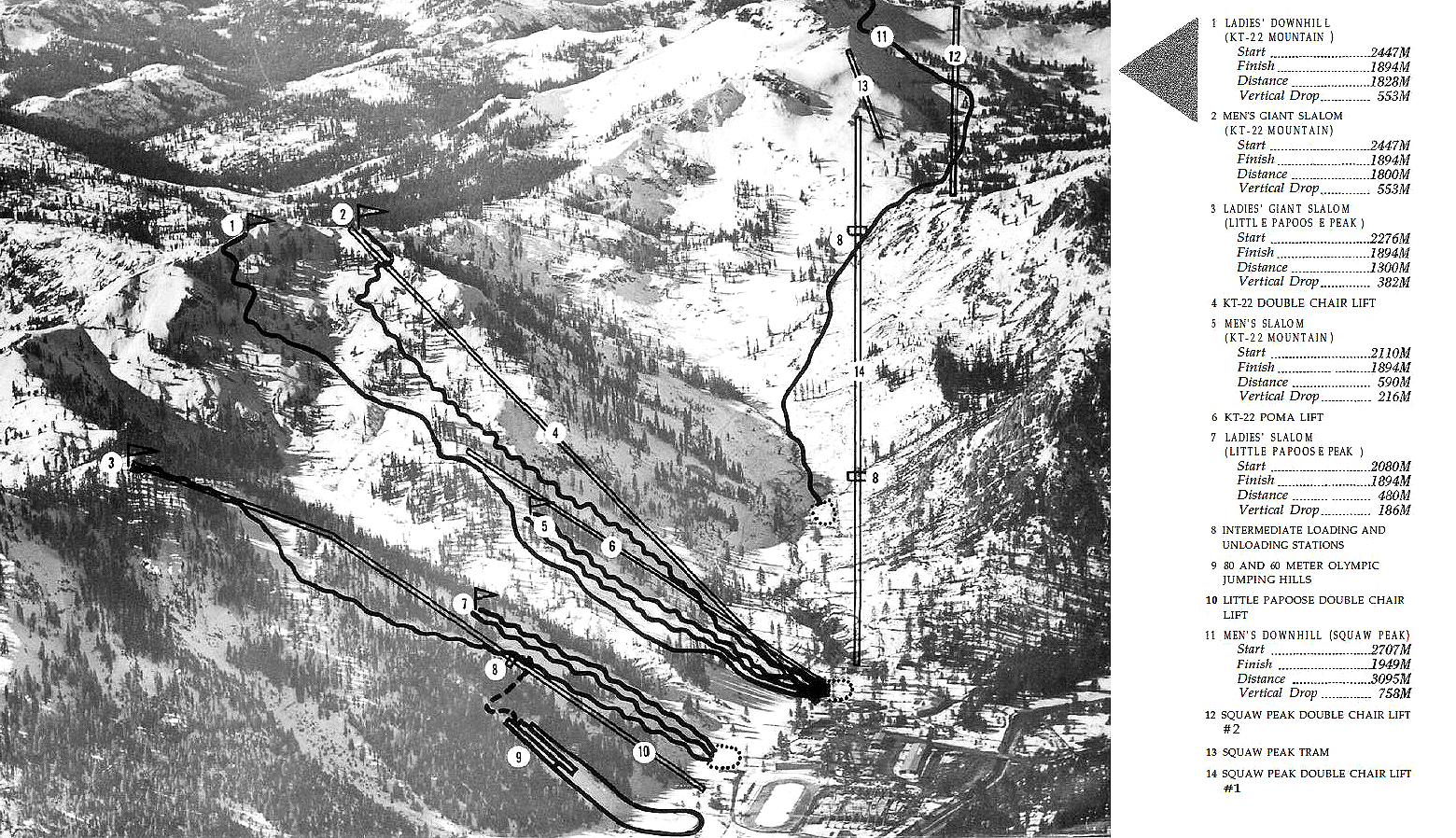
Alpine runs of the 1960 Winter Olympics

The Women's giant slalom competition of the 1960 Winter Olympics was held at Squaw Valley on Tuesday, February 23.

The defending world champion was Lucile Wheeler of Canada, who had retired from international competition.

Yvonne Rüegg of Switzerland edged Penny Pitou of the United States by a tenth of a second, the smallest margin at the time.

== Results ==
Rank	Name	Country	Time	Difference
1st place, gold medalist(s)	Yvonne Rüegg	Switzerland	1:39.9	—
2nd place, silver medalist(s)	Penny Pitou	United States	1:40.0	+ 0.1
3rd place, bronze medalist(s)	Giuliana Chenal-Minuzzo	Italy	1:40.2	+ 0.3
4	Betsy Snite	United States	1:40.4	+ 0.5
5	Anneliese Meggl	United Team of Germany	1:40.7	+ 0.8
5	Carla Marchelli	Italy	1:40.7	+ 0.8
7	Thérèse Leduc	France	1:40.8	+ 0.9
8	Anne-Marie Leduc	France	1:41.5	+ 1.6
9	Hilde Hofherr	Austria	1:41.9	+ 2.0
9	Sonja Sperl	United Team of Germany	1:41.9	+ 2.0
9	Madeleine Chamot-Berthod	Switzerland	1:41.9	+ 2.0
12	Anne Heggtveit	Canada	1:42.1	+ 2.2
13	Janine Monterrain	France	1:42.4	+ 2.5
14	Liselotte Michel	Switzerland	1:42.5	+ 2.6
15	Jerta Schir	Italy	1:42.6	+ 2.7
15	Barbi Henneberger	United Team of Germany	1:42.6	+ 2.7
17	Pia Riva	Italy	1:42.9	+ 3.0
18	Arlette Grosso	France	1:43.9	+ 4.0
19	Astrid Sandvik	Norway	1:45.4	+ 5.5
20	Inger Bjørnbakken	Norway	1:45.5	+ 5.6
21	Putzi Frandl	Austria	1:45.7	+ 5.8
21	Stalina Demidova-Korzukhina	Soviet Union	1:45.7	+ 5.8
23	Annemarie Waser	Switzerland	1:46.0	+ 6.1
24	Liv Jagge-Christiansen	Norway	1:46.4	+ 6.5
25	Traudl Hecher	Austria	1:46.7	+ 6.8
26	Nancy Greene	Canada	1:47.4	+ 7.5
27	Cecilia Womersley	New Zealand	1:47.7	+ 7.8
28	Elizabeth Greene	Canada	1:48.4	+ 8.5
29	Nancy Holland	Canada	1:48.7	+ 8.8
30	Lyubov Volkova	Soviet Union	1:48.9	+ 9.0
31	Yevgeniya Kabina-Sidorova	Soviet Union	1:50.0	+ 10.1
32	Christine Davy	Australia	1:50.7	+ 10.8
33	Josephine Gibbs	Great Britain	1:51.9	+ 12.0
34	Trish Prain	New Zealand	1:52.4	+ 12.5
35	María Cristina Schweizer	Argentina	1:55.2	+ 15.3
36	Beverley Anderson	United States	1:57.4	+ 17.5
37	Heidi Biebl	United Team of Germany	2:01.5	+ 21.6
38	Renate Holmes	Great Britain	2:03.9	+ 24.0
39	Wendy Farrington	Great Britain	2:04.2	+ 24.3
40	Sonja McCaskie	Great Britain	2:06.1	+ 26.2
-	Erika Netzer	Austria	DQ	-
-	Marit Haraldsen	Norway	DQ	-
-	Linda Meyers	United States	DQ	-
-	Marían Navarro	Spain	DQ	-
