= Alpine skiing at the 1960 Winter Olympics – Women's downhill =

Women's downhill at the VIII Olympic Winter Games
- Alpine skiing
- Venue: Squaw Valley
- Date: February 20, 1960
- Competitors: 42 from 14 nations
- Winning time: 1:37.6

Medalists
1st place, gold medalist(s)		Heidi Biebl	United Team of Germany
2nd place, silver medalist(s)		Penny Pitou	United States
3rd place, bronze medalist(s)		Traudl Hecher	Austria

Women's Downhill
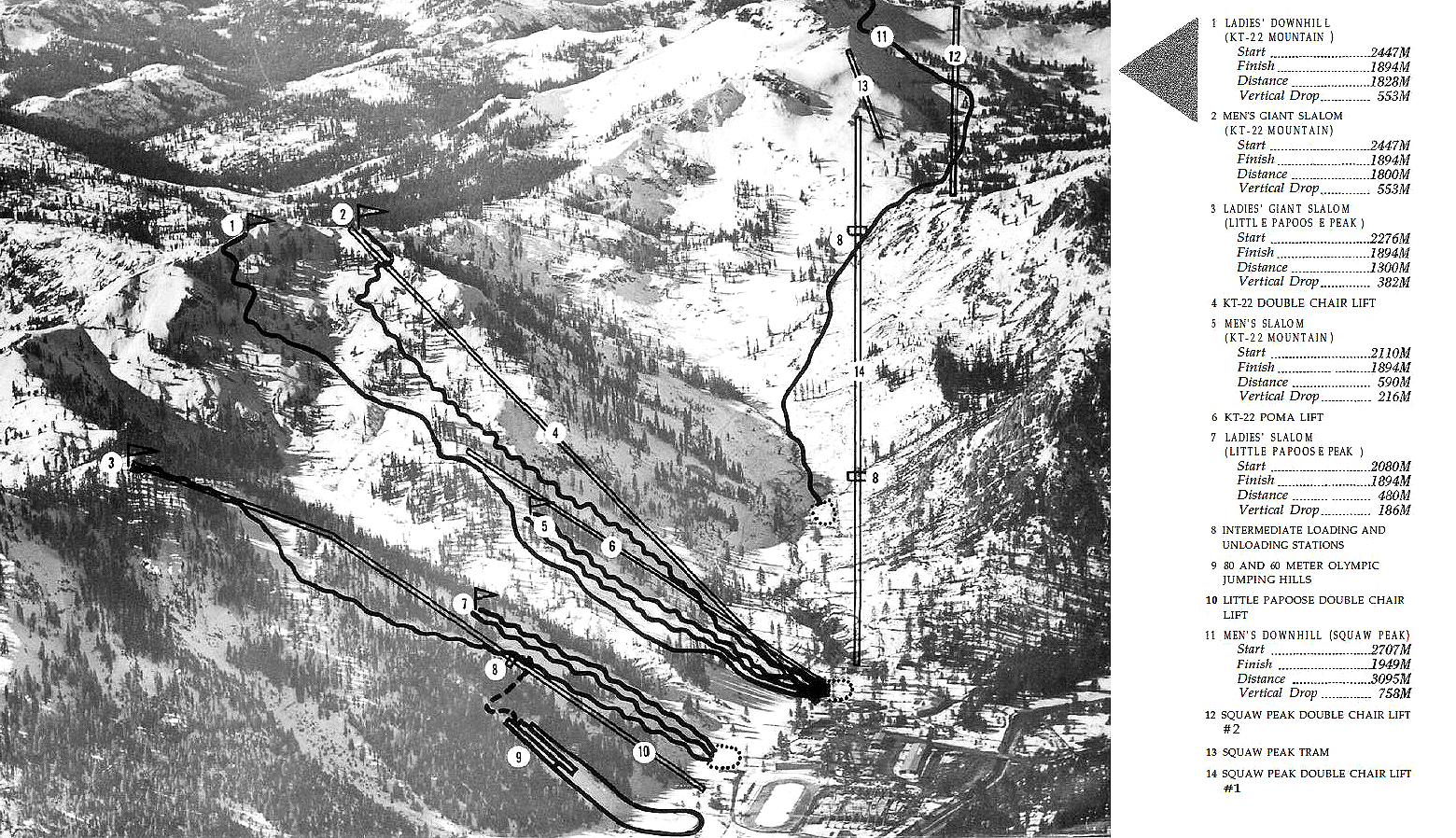
- Location: Squaw Valley – KT-22
- Vertical: 557 m (1,827 ft)
- Top elevation: 2,447 m (8,028 ft)
- Base elevation: 1,894 m (6,214 ft)

The Women's downhill competition of the Squaw Valley 1960 Olympics was held at Squaw Valley on Saturday, February 20.

The defending world champion was Lucile Wheeler of Canada, who had retired the previous year; defending Olympic champion Madeleine Berthod of Switzerland did not compete in this event.

Nineteen-year-old Heidi Biebl of Germany won the gold medal, while American Penny Pitou was a second behind for the silver; the bronze medalist was Traudl Hecher of Austria.

The race was run on KT-22, with a starting elevation of 2,447 m (8,028 ft) above sea level; the course length was 1.828 km (1.136 mi), with a vertical drop of 553 m (1,814 ft). Biebl's winning time of 97.6 seconds yielded an average speed of 67.426 km/h (41.9 mph), with an average vertical descent rate of 5.666 m/s (18.6 ft/s).

== Helmets ==
This was the first Olympic downhill in which crash helmets were mandatory, following the race death in 1959 of Canadian John Semmelink at Garmisch, West Germany. During his final race, Semmelink wore a leather helmet, which was more protection than many racers used at the time. The U.S. Ski Team first wore crash helmets at the 1956 Winter Olympics, but most of the Europeans went without.

== Results ==
Saturday, February 20, 1960
The race was started at 10:00 local time, (UTC −8).

Rank	Name	Country	Time	Difference
1st place, gold medalist(s)	Heidi Biebl	United Team of Germany	1:37.6	—
2nd place, silver medalist(s)	Penny Pitou	United States	1:38.6	+1.0
3rd place, bronze medalist(s)	Traudl Hecher	Austria	1:38.9	+1.3
4	Pia Riva	Italy	1:39.9	+2.3
5	Jerta Schir	Italy	1:40.5	+2.9
6	Anneliese Meggl	United Team of Germany	1:40.8	+3.2
7	Sonja Sperl	United Team of Germany	1:41.0	+3.4
8	Erika Netzer	Austria	1:41.1	+3.5
9	Yvonne Rüegg	Switzerland	1:41.6	+4.0
9	Carla Marchelli	Italy	1:41.6	+4.0
11	Barbi Henneberger	United Team of Germany	1:42.4	+4.8
12	Anne Heggtveit	Canada	1:42.9	+5.3
12	Marit Haraldsen	Norway	1:42.9	+5.3
14	Thérèse Leduc; Arlette Grosso	France	1:44.2	+6.6
14	Jolanda Schir	Italy	1:44.2	+6.6
17	Nancy Holland	Canada	1:45.2	+7.6
18	Marguerite Leduc	France	1:45.6	+8.0
19	Stalina Demidova-Korzukhina	Soviet Union	1:46.5	+8.9
20	Yevgeniya Kabina-Sidorova	Soviet Union	1:46.7	+9.1
21	Joan Hannah	United States	1:47.9	+10.3
22	Nancy Greene	Canada	1:48.3	+10.7
23	Lyubov Volkova	Soviet Union	1:49.2	+11.6
24	Marían Navarro	Spain	1:49.7	+12.1
25	Josephine Gibbs	Great Britain	1:50.3	+12.7
26	Margrit Gertsch	Switzerland	1:50.4	+12.8
27	Christine Davy	Australia	1:50.6	+13.0
28	Wendy Farrington	Great Britain	1:50.8	+13.2
29	María Cristina Schweizer	Argentina	1:51.0	+13.4
30	Liv Jagge-Christiansen	Norway	1:51.2	+13.6
31	Renate Holmes	Great Britain	1:51.9	+14.3
32	Elizabeth Greene	Canada	1:53.3	+15.7
33	Linda Meyers	United States	1:53.4	+15.8
34	Cecilia Womersley	New Zealand	1:59.5	+21.9
35	Liselotte Michel	Switzerland	2:01.0	+23.4
36	Trish Prain	New Zealand	2:01.5	+23.9
37	Astrid Sandvik	Norway	2:02.9	+25.3
38	Janine Monterrain	France	2:03.0	+25.4
39	Putzi Frandl	Austria	2:11.6	+34.0
-	Betsy Snite	United States	DQ	-
-	Annemarie Waser	Switzerland	DQ	-
-	Herlinde Beutlhauser	Austria	DQ	-
