= Alpine skiing at the 1956 Winter Olympics – Women's giant slalom =

The women's giant slalom at the 1956 Winter Olympics was held on 27 January in Cortina d'Ampezzo, Italy. It was run on the Canalone run on Mount Tofana. The course was 1,366 metres (4,482 ft) long with a 408 metres (1,339 ft) vertical drop. There were 46 gates that the women had to navigate. Forty-four women from sixteen countries competed. German skier Ossi Reichert won the event while Austrians won silver and bronze.

== Medalists ==
Gold	Silver	Bronze
Ossi Reichert; United Team of Germany	Josefine Frandl; Austria	Dorothea Hochleitner; Austria

== Results ==
Place	No.	Competitor	Time	Difference
1st place, gold medalist(s)	14	Ossi Reichert (EUA)	1:56.5	—
2nd place, silver medalist(s)	25	Josefine Frandl (AUT)	1:57.8	+1.3
3rd place, bronze medalist(s)	20	Dorothea Hochleitner (AUT)	1:58.2	+1.7
4	21	Andrea Mead Lawrence (USA)	1:58.3	+1.8
4	7	Madeleine Berthod (SUI)	1:58.3	+1.8
6	11	Lucille Wheeler (CAN)	1:58.6	+2.1
7	46	Borghild Niskin (NOR)	1:59.0	+2.5
8	17	Marysette Agnel (FRA)	1:59.4	+2.9
9	23	Regina Schöpf (AUT)	2:00.6	+4.1
10	9	Josette Neviere (FRA)	2:00.8	+4.3
11	4	Frieda Dänzer (SUI)	2:00.9	+4.4
12	31	Marianne Seltsam (EUA)	2:01.4	+4.9
13	16	Giuliana Chenal-Minuzzo (ITA)	2:01.5	+5.0
14	35	Inger Bjørnbakken (NOR)	2:02.3	+5.8
14	12	Madeleine Front (FRA)	2:02.3	+5.8
14	32	Annemarie Waser (SUI)	2:02.3	+5.8
17	38	Anna Pellissier (ITA)	2:02.4	+5.9
18	62	Paule Moris (FRA)	2:02.5	+6.0
19	29	Hannelore Glaser (EUA)	2:02.7	+6.2
20	1	Maria Kowalska (POL)	2:02.8	+6.3
21	15	Addie Pryor (GBR)	2:03.1	+6.6
22	55	Astrid Sandvik (NOR)	2:04.0	+7.5
22	50	Gladys Werner (USA)	2:04.0	+7.5
24	60	Inger Jorgensen (NOR)	2:04.4	+7.9
25	33	Ingrid Englund (SWE)	2:04.5	+8.0
26	58	Eivor Berglund (SWE)	2:04.9	+8.4
27	48	Mirl Buchner (EUA)	2:05.0	+8.5
28	44	Maria Grazia Marchelli (ITA)	2:05.2	+8.7
29	36	Anne Heggtveit (CAN)	2:05.3	+8.8
30	87	Barbara Grocholska (POL)	2:05.5	+9.0
31	84	Vivi-Anne Wassdahl (SWE)	2:06.4	+9.9
32	42	Slava Zupancie (YUG)	2:07.9	+11.4
33	63	Trude Klecker (AUT)	2:08.5	+12.0
34	45	Penny Pitou (USA)	2:10.4	+13.9
35	54	Maria Gasienica-Daniel (POL)	2:10.9	+14.4
36	53	Ginette Seguin (CAN)	2:16.6	+20.1
37	91	Christine Davy (AUS)	2:17.3	+20.8
38	89	Susanne Holmes (GBR)	2:19.0	+22.5
39	72	Magdalena Marotineanu (ROM)	2:21.0	+24.5
40	85	Sidorova Evgeniya (URS)	2:31.3	+34.8
41	79	Jakobina Jakobsdottir (ISL)	2:39.4	+42.9
42	69	Jocelyn Wardrop-Moore (GBR)	2:39.8	+43.3
43	81	Elena Epuran (ROM)	3:20.5	+1:24.0
44	77	Aleksandra Artemenko (URS)	4:04.5	+2:08.0
		Hedi Beeler (SUI)	DQ	
		Carlyn Kruger (CAN)	DQ	
		Vera Schenone (ITA)	DQ	
		Jeanne Sandford (GBR)	DQ	
		Betsy Snite (USA)	DQ	

== See also ==
- List of IOC country codes
- 1956 Winter Olympics
