= Alpine skiing at the 1956 Winter Olympics – Women's downhill =

Women's downhill at the VII Olympic Winter Games
- Alpine skiing
- Venue: Mt. Tofana, Cortina d'Ampezzo, Italy
- Date: 1 February 1956
- Competitors: 44 from 16 nations
- Winning time: 1:40.7

Medalists
1st place, gold medalist(s)		Madeleine Berthod	Switzerland
2nd place, silver medalist(s)		Frieda Dänzer	Switzerland
3rd place, bronze medalist(s)		Lucile Wheeler	Canada

Women's Downhill
- Location: Canalone –Tofana
- Vertical: 502 m (1,647 ft)
- Top elevation: 2,114 m (6,936 ft)
- Base elevation: 1,612 m (5,289 ft)

The women's downhill event of the 1956 Winter Olympics at Cortina d'Ampezzo, Italy, was held on Mt. Tofana on Wednesday, 1 February.

The Swiss took the top two spots as Madeleine Berthod won the gold and Frieda Dänzer took the silver; Lucile Wheeler of Canada was the bronze medalist. Forty-four women from sixteen countries finished the race.

The race was held on the Canalone piste, with a starting elevation of 2,114 m (6,936 ft) above sea level with a vertical drop of 502 m (1,647 ft); the course length was 1.552 km (0.96 mi). Berthoud's winning time of 100.7 seconds yielded an average speed of 55.484 km/h (34.5 mph), with an average vertical descent rate of 4.985 m/s (16.4 ft/s).

== Results ==
Wednesday, 1 February 1956
The race was started at 11:30 local time, (UTC+1). At the starting gate, the skies were clear, the temperature was −8 °C (18 °F), and the snow condition was hard.

Rank	Bib	Competitor	Time	Difference
1st place, gold medalist(s)	6	Madeleine Berthod (SUI)	1:40.7	—
2nd place, silver medalist(s)	20	Frieda Dänzer (SUI)	1:45.4	+4.7
3rd place, bronze medalist(s)	4	Lucile Wheeler (CAN)	1:45.9	+5.2
4	12	Giuliana Chenal-Minuzzo (ITA)	1:47.3	+6.6
4	15	Hilde Hofherr (AUT)	1:47.3	+6.6
6	1	Carla Marchelli (ITA)	1:47.7	+7.0
7	21	Dorothea Hochleitner (AUT)	1:47.9	+7.2
8	18	Josette Nevière (FRA)	1:49.2	+8.5
9	7	Borghild Niskin (NOR)	1:49.5	+8.8
10	28	Gladys Werner (USA)	1:49.6	+8.9
11	26	Anna Pellissier (ITA)	1:49.7	+9.0
12	22	Trude Klecker (AUT)	1:50.6	+9.9
13	23	Josefine Frandl (AUT)	1:51.0	+10.3
14	51	Aleksandra Artyomenko (URS)	1:51.1	+10.4
15	30	Eivor Berglund (SWE)	1:51.6	+10.9
15	32	Rosmarie Reichenbach (SUI)	1:51.6	+10.9
17	10	Barbara Grocholska (POL)	1:51.7	+11.0
18	29	Ingrid Englund (SWE)	1:51.8	+11.1
19	11	Maria Kowalska (POL)	1:51.9	+11.2
20	16	Ossi Reichert (EUA)	1:52.3	+11.6
21	14	Marysette Agnel (FRA)	1:52.4	+11.7
22	37	Anne Heggtveit (CAN)	1:53.2	+12.5
22	31	Carlyn Kruger (CAN)	1:53.2	+12.5
24	25	Madeleine Front (FRA)	1:53.6	+12.9
25	2	Hedi Beeler (SUI)	1:54.0	+13.3
26	39	Inger Jorgensen (NOR)	1:54.3	+13.6
27	9	Astrid Sandvik (NOR)	1:54.4	+13.7
28	41	Slava Zupančič (YUG)	1:54.5	+13.8
29	13	Hannelore Glaser (EUA)	1:54.7	+14.0
30	5	Andrea Mead Lawrence (USA)	1:55.2	+14.5
31	52	Jakobína Jakobsdóttir (ISL)	1:57.2	+16.5
32	19	Sonja Sperl (EUA)	1:57.8	+17.1
33	53	Ginette Seguin (CAN)	1:58.2	+17.5
34	47	Penny Pitou (USA)	1:58.9	+18.2
35	50	Zandra Nowell (GBR)	1:59.0	+18.3
36	40	Vera Schenone (ITA)	1:59.2	+18.5
37	17	Yevgenya Sidorova (URS)	1:59.8	+19.1
38	55	Dorothy Surgenor (USA)	2:01.5	+20.8
39	54	Christine Davy (AUS)	2:01.6	+20.9
40	46	Magdalena Marotineanu (ROM)	2:04.0	+23.3
41	49	Renate Holmes (GBR)	2:05.0	+24.3
42	38	Vivi-Anne Wassdahl (SWE)	2:08.0	+27.3
43	45	Jeanne Sandford (GBR)	2:15.1	+34.4
44	48	Elena Epuran (ROM)	2:27.7	+47.0
—	3	Edith Bonlieu (FRA)	INJ	
—	8	Mirl Buchner (EUA)	INJ	
—	33	Maria Gąsienica Daniel-Szatkowska (POL)	INJ	

== See also ==
- List of IOC country codes
- 1956 Winter Olympics
