= Alpine skiing at the 1964 Winter Olympics – Women's downhill =

Women's downhill at the IX Olympic Winter Games
- Venue: Axamer Lizum
- Date: February 6, 1964
- Competitors: 43 from 15 nations
- Winning time: 1:55.39

Medalists
1st place, gold medalist(s)		Christl Haas	Austria
2nd place, silver medalist(s)		Edith Zimmermann	Austria
3rd place, bronze medalist(s)		Traudl Hecher	Austria

Women's Downhill
- Location: Axamer Lizum
- Vertical: 705 m (2,313 ft)
- Top elevation: 2,310 m (7,579 ft)
- Base elevation: 1,605 m (5,266 ft)

The Women's downhill competition of the Innsbruck 1964 Olympics was held at Axamer Lizum on Thursday, 6 February.

The defending world champion was Christl Haas of Austria; she won the event and led a sweep of the medals for the home country, as Edith Zimmermann took the silver. Traudl Hecher also won the bronze medal in the 1960 downhill at age 16: her daughter Elisabeth Görgl won the same medal in the same event in 2010.

The starting gate was at an elevation of 2,310 m (7,579 ft), and the vertical drop was 705 m (2,313 ft). The course length was 2.510 km (1.56 mi) and Haas' winning run of 115.39 seconds resulted in an average speed of 78.308 km/h (48.7 mph), with an average vertical descent rate of 6.110 m/s (20.0 ft/s).

== Results ==
Thursday, 6 February 1964

Rank	Bib	Name	Country	Time	Difference
1st place, gold medalist(s)	13	Christl Haas	Austria	1:55.39	—
2nd place, silver medalist(s)	11	Edith Zimmermann	Austria	1:56.42	+1.03
3rd place, bronze medalist(s)	4	Traudl Hecher	Austria	1:56.66	+1.27
4	2	Heidi Biebl	United Team of Germany	1:57.87	+2.48
5	7	Barbi Henneberger	United Team of Germany	1:58.03	+2.64
6	1	Madeleine Bochatay	France	1:59.11	+3.72
7	5	Nancy Greene	Canada	1:59.23	+3.84
8	9	Christine Terraillon	France	1:59.66	+4.27
9	10	Annie Famose	France	1:59.86	+4.47
10	14	Marielle Goitschel	France	2:00.77	+5.38
11	28	Giustina Demetz	Italy	2:01.20	+5.81
12	20	Burgl Färbinger	United Team of Germany	2:01.23	+5.84
13	12	Patricia du Roy de Blicquy	Belgium	2:01.41	+6.02
14	8	Starr Walton	United States	2:01.45	+6.06
15	21	Joan Hannah	United States	2:01.88	+6.49
16	45	Gina Hathorn	Great Britain	2:02.20	+6.81
17	31	Heidi Obrecht	Switzerland	2:02.23	+6.84
18	6	Pia Riva	Italy	2:02.25	+6.86
19	3	Theres Obrecht	Switzerland	2:02.41	+7.02
20	17	Ruth Adolf	Switzerland	2:02.59	+7.20
21	23	Margo Walters	United States	2:02.68	+7.29
22	27	Edda Kainz	Austria	2:02.69	+7.30
23	29	Heidi Mittermaier	United Team of Germany	2:03.05	+7.66
24	24	Linda Crutchfield	Canada	2:03.10	+7.71
25	26	Lidia Barbieri Sacconaghi	Italy	2:03.38	+7.99
26	15	Jean Saubert	United States	2:03.79	+8.40
27	49	Christine Smith	Australia	2:03.82	+8.43
28	42	Karen Dokka	Canada	2:04.04	+8.65
29	38	Liv Jagge	Norway	2:04.07	+8.68
30	44	Divina Galica	Great Britain	2:04.10	+8.71
31	18	Inge Senoner	Italy	2:04.22	+8.83
31	41	Krista Fanedl	Yugoslavia	2:04.22	+8.83
33	22	Majda Ankele	Yugoslavia	2:04.46	+9.07
34	25	Nancy Holland	Canada	2:04.53	+9.14
35	30	Tania Heald	Great Britain	2:04.82	+9.43
36	46	Dikke Eger	Norway	2:05.10	+9.71
37	50	Yevgeniya Kabina	Soviet Union	2:05.19	+9.80
38	39	Anna Asheshov	Great Britain	2:05.41	+10.02
39	40	Galina Sidorova	Soviet Union	2:08.32	+12.93
40	48	Stalina Demidova	Soviet Union	2:09.28	+13.89
41	43	Maria Szatkowska	Poland	2:11.75	+16.36
42	51	Judy Forras	Australia	2:13.83	+18.44
43	52	Ildikó Szendrődi-Kővári	Hungary	2:22.22	+26.83
	19	Fernande Bochatay	Switzerland	DNS	
