= France at the 1960 Winter Olympics =

- IOC code: FRA
- NOC: French Olympic Committee

in Squaw Valley, United States 18–28 February 1960
- Competitors: 26 (18 men, 8 women) in 6 sports
- Flag bearer: Benoît Carrara (cross-country skiing)
- Medals Ranked 10th: Gold 1 Silver 0 Bronze 2 Total 3

Winter Olympics appearances (overview)
- 1924; 1928; 1932; 1936; 1948; 1952; 1956; 1960; 1964; 1968; 1972; 1976; 1980; 1984; 1988; 1992; 1994; 1998; 2002; 2006; 2010; 2014; 2018; 2022; 2026

France competed at the 1960 Winter Olympics in Squaw Valley, United States.

== Medalists ==
Medal	Name	Sport	Event
Gold	Jean Vuarnet	Alpine skiing	Men's downhill
Bronze	Guy Périllat	Alpine skiing	Men's downhill
Bronze	Charles Bozon	Alpine skiing	Men's slalom

== Alpine skiing ==
Men

Athlete	Event	Race 1		Race 2		Total	
Athlete	Event	Time	Rank	Time	Rank	Time	Rank
Adrien Duvillard	Downhill					DSQ	–
Charles Bozon	Downhill					2:09.6	8
Guy Périllat	Downhill					2:06.9	3rd place, bronze medalist(s)
Jean Vuarnet	Downhill					2:06.0	1st place, gold medalist(s)
François Bonlieu	Giant Slalom					1:51.2	11
Adrien Duvillard	Giant Slalom					1:51.1	10
Charles Bozon	Giant Slalom					1:51.0	9
Guy Périllat	Giant Slalom					1:50.7	6
Adrien Duvillard	Slalom	1:21.9	31	DSQ	–	DSQ	–
Guy Périllat	Slalom	1:11.0	8	1:00.8	6	2:11.8	6
Charles Bozon	Slalom	1:09.8	2	1:00.6	5	2:10.4	3rd place, bronze medalist(s)
François Bonlieu	Slalom	1:09.8	2	DSQ	–	DSQ	–

Women

Athlete	Event	Race 1		Race 2		Total	
Athlete	Event	Time	Rank	Time	Rank	Time	Rank
Janine Monterrain	Downhill					2:03.0	38
Marguerite Leduc	Downhill					1:45.6	18
Arlette Grosso	Downhill					1:44.2	14
Thérèse Leduc	Downhill					1:44.2	14
Arlette Grosso	Giant Slalom					1:43.9	18
Janine Monterrain	Giant Slalom					1:42.4	13
Anne-Marie Leduc	Giant Slalom					1:41.5	8
Thérèse Leduc	Giant Slalom					1:40.8	7
Arlette Grosso	Slalom	1:07.5	33	59.3	8	2:06.8	22
Marguerite Leduc	Slalom	1:02.2	23	1:02.4	20	2:04.6	19
Thérèse Leduc	Slalom	59.2	16	58.2	4	1:57.4	4
Anne-Marie Leduc	Slalom	58.6	11	1:04.9	26	2:03.5	17

== Biathlon ==
Men

Event	Athlete	Time	Missed targets	Adjusted time ^{1}	Rank
20 km	Paul Romand	1'28:48.4	18	2'04:48.4	28
20 km	Gilbert Mercier	1'29:16.6	17	2'03:16.6	27
20 km	Victor Arbez	1'25:58.4	18	2'01:58.4	25
20 km	René Mercier	1'26:13.2	15	1'56:13.2	22

^{1} Two minutes added per missed target.

== Cross-country skiing ==
Men

Event	Athlete	Race	
Event	Athlete	Time	Rank
15 km	René Mandrillon	56:01.5	29
15 km	Victor Arbez	55:41.1	26
15 km	Benoît Carrara	55:38.5	25
15 km	Jean Mermet	54:44.5	21
30 km	René Mandrillon	2'02:05.3	25
30 km	Jean Mermet	1'58:57.9	19

Men's 4 × 10 km relay

Athletes	Race	
Athletes	Time	Rank
Victor Arbez; René Mandrillon; Benoît Carrara; Jean Mermet	2'26:30.8	7

== Figure skating ==
Men

Athlete	CF	FS	Points	Places	Rank
Alain Calmat	8	6	1340.3	54	6
Alain Giletti	3	3	1399.2	31	4

Women

Athlete	CF	FS	Points	Places	Rank
Danielle Rigoulot	11	13	1253.8	107	13
Nicole Hassler	12	12	1272.6	97	11

== Ski jumping ==
Athlete	Event	Jump 1			Jump 2			Total	
Athlete	Event	Distance	Points	Rank	Distance	Points	Rank	Points	Rank
Régis Robert Rey	Normal hill	78.0	87.7	38	72.0	91.6	38	179.3	38
Claude Jean-Prost	Normal hill	84.5	99.9	21	75.5	96.9	30	196.8	26

== Speed skating ==
Men

Event	Athlete	Race	
Event	Athlete	Time	Rank
500 m	Raymond Gilloz	42.0	18
500 m	André Kouprianoff	41.5	15
1500 m	Raymond Gilloz	2:14.2	10
1500 m	André Kouprianoff	2:13.3	8
5000 m	Raymond Gilloz	8:11.5	10
5000 m	André Kouprianoff	8:10.4	9
10,000 m	André Kouprianoff	16:39.1	11

Women

Event	Athlete	Race	
Event	Athlete	Time	Rank
500 m	Françoise Lucas	48.3	13
1000 m	Françoise Lucas	1:38.4	14
1500 m	Françoise Lucas	2:36.6	17
3000 m	Françoise Lucas	5:42.5	15
