= Renie Cox =

American alpine skier (born 1938)

Personal information
- Full name: Renie Katherine Cox
- Nationality: American
- Born: September 15, 1938 (age 88) Lowville, New York, U.S.
- Spouse: Dave Gorsuch

Sport
- Sport: Alpine skiing

Renie Cox (born September 15, 1938) is a retired American alpine ski racer and a former member of the United States Ski Team. She competed in the slalom at the 1960 Winter Olympics and finished ninth.

Born in Lowville, New York, Cox was raised in the Lake Placid area and attended the University of Denver in Colorado. She married fellow ski team member Dave Gorsuch and they resided in Colorado.

== Olympic results ==
Year	Age	Slalom	Giant Slalom	Super-G	Downhill	Combined
1960	21	9	—	not run	—	not run
