= Great Britain at the 1960 Winter Olympics =

- Flag of the United Kingdom
- IOC code: GBR (GRB used at these Games)
- NOC: British Olympic Association

in Squaw Valley
- Competitors: 17 (11 men, 5 women) in 5 sports
- Flag bearers: Capt. John Moore (biathlon, cross-country)
- Medals: Gold 0 Silver 0 Bronze 0 Total 0

Winter Olympics appearances (overview)
- 1924; 1928; 1932; 1936; 1948; 1952; 1956; 1960; 1964; 1968; 1972; 1976; 1980; 1984; 1988; 1992; 1994; 1998; 2002; 2006; 2010; 2014; 2018; 2022; 2026

The United Kingdom of Great Britain and Northern Ireland competed as Great Britain at the 1960 Winter Olympics in Squaw Valley, United States.

== Alpine skiing ==
Men

Athlete	Event	Race 1		Race 2		Total	
Athlete	Event	Time	Rank	Time	Rank	Time	Rank
John Oakes	Downhill					2:36.0	55
Robert Skepper	Downhill					2:28.1	43
Geoffrey Pitchford	Downhill					2:27.3	40
Charlach Mackintosh	Downhill					2:25.1	35
Charlach Mackintosh	Giant Slalom					DSQ	–
Robert Skepper	Giant Slalom					2:26.2	53
Geoffrey Pitchford	Giant Slalom					2:20.4	50
John Oakes	Giant Slalom					2:16.3	48
Robert Skepper	Slalom	1:41.6	50	1:18.5	27	3:00.1	36
Geoffrey Pitchford	Slalom	1:23.5	34	DSQ	–	DSQ	–

Women

Athlete	Event	Race 1		Race 2		Total	
Athlete	Event	Time	Rank	Time	Rank	Time	Rank
Renate Holmes	Downhill					1:51.9	31
Wendy Farrington	Downhill					1:50.8	28
Josephine Gibbs	Downhill					1:50.3	25
Sonja McCaskie	Giant Slalom					2:06.1	40
Wendy Farrington	Giant Slalom					2:04.2	39
Renate Holmes	Giant Slalom					2:03.9	38
Josephine Gibbs	Giant Slalom					1:51.9	33
Renate Holmes	Slalom	1:16.1	40	1:07.4	29	2:23.5	34
Wendy Farrington	Slalom	1:08.4	34	1:30.8	37	2:39.2	37
Josephine Gibbs	Slalom	1:04.1	27	1:09.1	31	2:13.2	27

== Biathlon ==
Event	Athlete	Time	Missed targets	Adjusted time ^{1}	Rank
20 km	Norman Shutt	1'45:36.5	13	2'11:36.5	30
20 km	John Moore	1'40:50.8	14	2'08:50.8	29

^{1} Two minutes added per missed target.

== Cross-country skiing ==
Men

Event	Athlete	Race	
Event	Athlete	Time	Rank
15 km	Norman Shutt	1'07:34.0	52
15 km	Andrew Morgan	1'01:32.9	49
15 km	John Moore	58:35.0	44
30 km	Andrew Morgan	2'13:38.9	41
30 km	John Moore	2'08:58.6	38
50 km	Andrew Morgan	DNF	–
50 km	Norman Shutt	DNF	–
50 km	John Moore	3'43:15.3	30

== Figure skating ==
Men

Athlete	CF	FS	Points	Places	Rank
David Clements	16	13	1174.7	135	15
Robin Jones	15	12	1220.4	113	12

Women

Athlete	CF	FS	Points	Places	Rank
Carolyn Krau	17	21	1160.3	168	19
Patricia Pauley	14	16	1213.8	134	15

== Speed skating ==
Men

Event	Athlete	Race	
Event	Athlete	Time	Rank
500 m	Terry Malkin	DNF	–
500 m	Terry Monaghan	44.0	38
1500 m	Terry Malkin	2:25.0	40
1500 m	Terry Monaghan	2:19.9	26
5000 m	Terry Malkin	8:56.1	33
5000 m	Terry Monaghan	8:15.3	11
10,000 m	Terry Monaghan	16:31.6	5
