= Beverley Anderson =

American alpine skier (born 1938)

Personal information
- Born: June 2, 1938 (age 88) Ladysmith, Wisconsin, U.S.

Sport
- Sport: Alpine skiing

Beverley Marie Anderson-Brockway (born June 2, 1938) is a retired American alpine ski racer and a former member of the United States Ski Team. She competed in two events at the 1960 Winter Olympics.

Born in Ladysmith, Wisconsin, Anderson was raised in Mullan, Idaho, ski raced out of Lookout Pass, and attended the University of Washington in Seattle.

== Olympic results ==
| Year | Age | Slalom | Giant Slalom | Super-G | Downhill | Combined |
|---|---|---|---|---|---|---|
| 1960 | 21 | 26 | 36 | not run | — | not run |
