= Betsy Snite =

American alpine skier (1938–1984)

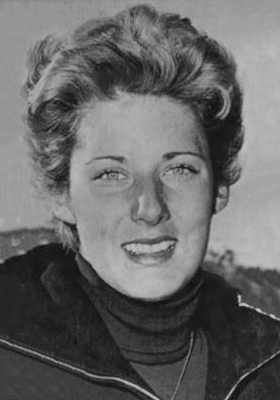
- Snite at the 1960 Olympics

Personal information
- Born: December 20, 1938 Grand Rapids, Michigan, U.S.
- Died: June 15, 1984 (aged 45) Burlington, Vermont, U.S.

Skiing career
- Sport: Alpine skiing
- Disciplines: Downhill, giant slalom, slalom, combined

Olympics
- Teams: 2 – (1956, 1960)
- Medals: 1 (0 gold)

World Championships
- Teams: 4 includes two Olympics
- Medals: 1 (0 gold)
Medal record
Women's alpine skiing
Representing the United States
Olympic Games
Silver medal – second place	1960 Squaw Valley	Slalom

Betsy Baxter Snite (later Riley, December 20, 1938 – June 15, 1984) was an American alpine ski racer and Olympic medalist. She competed in the Winter Olympics in 1956 and 1960 and won the silver medal in the slalom in the latter.

Born in Grand Rapids, Michigan, Snite grew up in Norwich, Vermont, and was U.S. slalom champion in 1955 at age 16, edging Olympic gold medalist Andrea Mead Lawrence. She participated in the giant slalom in 1956 at Cortina d'Ampezzo, but did not finish.

Four years later at Squaw Valley, Snite won the silver medal in the slalom. In the giant slalom she finished fourth, but did not finish the downhill. Shortly before the Olympics, she was on the cover of Sports Illustrated.

According to the Vermont Ski Museum, Betsy learned to ski on Cemetery Hill in Norwich and with the Ford K. Sayre Memorial ski program. When she got too good, she trained with the Dartmouth College ski team.

She married Bill Riley in 1964, and they resided in Vermont at Stowe. She died at age 45 in 1984, after a brief battle with cancer.

== Olympic results ==
Year	Age	Slalom	Giant Slalom	Super-G	Downhill	Combined
1956	17	—	DSQ	not run	—	not run
1960	21	2	4	not run	DNF	not run
