= Putzi Frandl =

Austrian former alpine ski racer

Olympic medal record

Women's Alpine skiing

Representing Austria
Silver medal – second place	1956 Cortina	Giant slalom

Josefine "Putzi" Frandl (later Crotty; born 5 July 1930) is an Austrian former alpine ski racer. She was among the world's best ski racers in the mid-1950s. She competed in the 1956 Winter Olympics, the 1958 Alpine World Ski Championships and the 1960 Winter Olympics. She was born in Radstadt, Austria.

== Major Competitions History ==
In 1956 Winter Olympics she won the silver medal in the giant slalom event. In the slalom competition she finished fifth and had a 13th-place finish in the downhill contest. Four years later, at the Squaw Valley, California Winter Olympics, she finished 16th in the 1960 slalom event, 21st in the giant slalom competition, and 39th in the downhill contest.

Frandl and some of her friends and teammates went out to ski the fresh powder snow. Unfortunately, while coming down one run, the tip of one of Frandl's skis went under a log hidden just under the newly fallen snow. Her shin hit the log hard, scraping it and straining her leg. Frandl believed that the injury possibly prevented her from winning another Olympic Medal. At the 1958 World Championships, Frandl won silver in slalom and bronze in the combined.

== Personal life ==
After retiring Frandl worked as a ski instructor in Austria. In one of her classes she met US Air Force officer Patrick Crotty. They eventually married. Patrick's career took Putzi and their family to many places, and whenever there was a ski resort close enough Putzi would teach skiing. Among the places she taught were Mad River Mountain and Copper Mountain. She worked at Copper during the 2008–2009 season but decided to concentrate on her "second love", tennis in 2009–2010. She lives in Centennial, Colorado.
