= Barbara Henneberger =

German alpine skier (1940–1964)

Barbi Henneberger
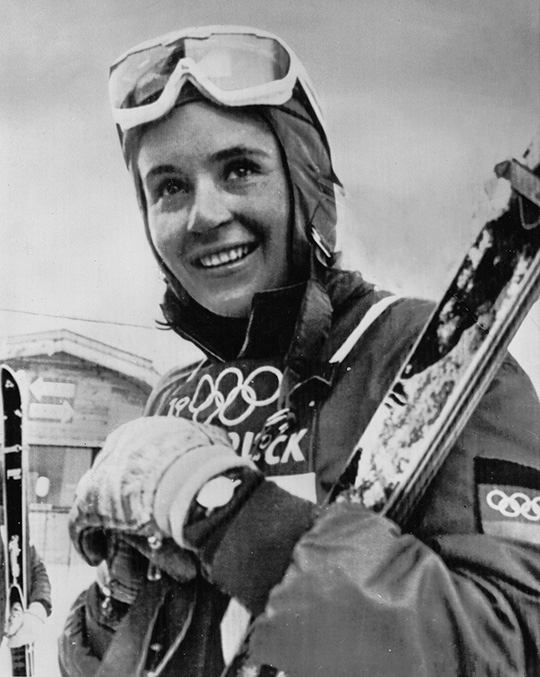
- Henneberger at the 1964 Olympics

Personal information
- Born: Barbara Maria Henneberger; 4 October 1940 Oberstaufen, Bavaria, Germany
- Died: 12 April 1964 (aged 23) Trais Fleur slope near St. Moritz, Switzerland
- Height: 168 cm (5 ft 6 in)

Skiing career
- Sport: Alpine skiing
- Club: TAK München
- Disciplines: Downhill, giant slalom, slalom, combined

Olympics
- Teams: 2 – (1960, 1964)
- Medals: 1 (0 gold)

World Championships
- Teams: 3 – (1960, 1962, 1964) includes two Olympics
- Medals: 2 (0 gold)
Medal record
Women's alpine skiing
Representing Germany
Olympic Games
| Bronze medal – third place | 1960 Squaw Valley | Slalom |
Representing West Germany
World Championships
| Bronze medal – third place | 1960 Squaw Valley | Combined |

Barbara-Maria "Barbi" Henneberger (4 October 1940 – 12 April 1964) was an alpine ski racer and Olympic medalist from West Germany. She competed for the United Team of Germany at the 1960 and 1964 Winter Olympics, and at the 1962 World Championships.

== Ski racing ==
Born in Oberstaufen, Bavaria, Henneberger competed in the 1960 Winter Olympics at Squaw Valley at age 19. She won the bronze medal in the slalom, finished eleventh in the downhill, and 15th in the giant slalom. Henneberger was third in the combined, which earned a world championship medal. Four years later in 1964 at Innsbruck, she finished fifth in the downhill, seventh in the giant slalom, and tenth in the slalom.

In North America to model clothes after the 1963 season ended in Europe, Henneberger was not planning to compete at the U.S. Alpine Championships in Alaska at Alyeska in early April. Using borrowed skis, she won the downhill and slalom and finished second in the giant slalom.

== Death ==
Following the 1964 season, Henneberger and a dozen others were in Switzerland near St. Moritz in April to film the promotional movie Ski Fascination for Willy Bogner, Jr. Caught in a spring avalanche, she died at age 23 in Val Selin along with U.S. racer Buddy Werner. Both had raced ahead of the first avalanche, but were caught by a second from an opposite slope. Found hours later under 8 to 10 feet (2.4 to 3.0 m) of snow, their deaths were attributed to suffocation, and were the only two fatalities in the group. Her funeral and procession in Munich were attended by thousands.

Bogner, 22, and Henneberger were to be engaged that summer; he was tried by a Swiss court for homicide by negligence. After Bogner was initially acquitted, the prosecution pursued an appeal and won a conviction for manslaughter by negligence, and Bogner received a two-month suspended sentence.

== World championship results ==
| Year | Age | Slalom | Giant Slalom | Super-G | Downhill | Combined |
|---|---|---|---|---|---|---|
| 1960 | 19 | 3 | 15 | not run | 11 | 3 |
| 1962 | 21 | 5 | 13 | not run | 4 | 4 |
| 1964 | 23 | 10 | 7 | not run | 5 | 5 |

From 1948 through 1980, the Winter Olympics were also the World Championships for alpine skiing.

== Olympic results ==
| Year | Age | Slalom | Giant Slalom | Super-G | Downhill | Combined |
|---|---|---|---|---|---|---|
| 1960 | 19 | 3 | 15 | not run | 11 | not run |
| 1964 | 23 | 10 | 7 | not run | 5 | not run |
