= Pitou =

Pitou may refer to:

- Pitou, Changhua (埤頭), a rural township in Taiwan
- Penny Pitou (born 1938), a former American alpine skier
- Neferpitou, nicknamed "Pitou", a fictional character in the manga series Hunter x Hunter
