= Thea Hochleitner =

Austrian alpine skier (1925–2012)

Olympic medal record

Women's Alpine skiing

Representing Austria
Bronze medal – third place	1956 Cortina	Giant slalom

Dorothea "Thea" Hochleitner (10 July 1925 – 11 May 2012) was an Austrian alpine skier who competed in the 1956 Winter Olympics.

She was born in Bad Gastein.

In 1956, she won the bronze medal in the giant slalom event. In the downhill competition, she finished seventh, and in the slalom contest, she finished twelfth.
