= Traudl Hecher =

Austrian alpine skier (1943–2023)

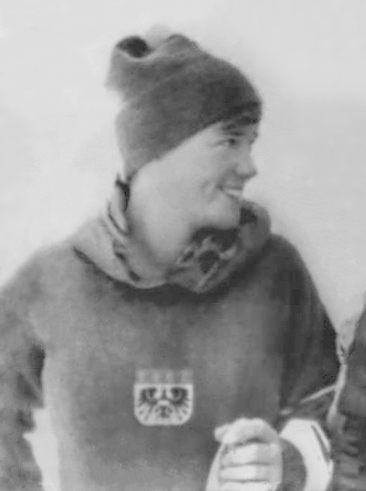
- Hecher in 1962

Personal information
- Born: 28 September 1943 Schwaz, Tyrol, Austria
- Died: 10 January 2023 (aged 79) Schwaz, Tyrol, Austria

Skiing career
- Sport: Alpine skiing
- Club: SK Schwaz
- Retired: 1967 (age 23)
- Disciplines: Downhill, giant slalom, slalom, combined
- World Cup debut: 7 January 1967 (age 23) inaugural season

Olympics
- Teams: 2 – (1960, 1964)
- Medals: 2 (0 gold)

World Championships
- Teams: 4 – (1960, 1962, 1964, 1966) includes two Olympics
- Medals: 2 (0 gold)

World Cup
- Seasons: 1 – (1967)
- Wins: 0
- Podiums: 2 – (1 GS, 1 SL)
- Overall titles: 0 – (7th in 1967)
- Discipline titles: 0 – (7th in SL 1967)
Medal record
Women's alpine skiing
Representing Austria
Olympic Games
Bronze medal – third place	1960 Squaw Valley	Downhill
Bronze medal – third place	1964 Innsbruck	Downhill

Waltraud J. "Traudl" Hecher-Görgl (28 September 1943 – 10 January 2023) was an Austrian World Cup alpine ski racer and Olympic medalist.

== Career ==
Hecher won Olympic bronze medals in the downhill event in 1960 at Squaw Valley and in 1964 at Innsbruck. Her medal in 1960 at age 16 made her the youngest alpine skiing medalist ever, an honor she retains more than fifty years later. She raced through the 1967 season, the first year of World Cup competition.

== Personal life ==
Hecher was born in Schwaz, Tyrol. She retired in the summer of 1967. She later married Anton Görgl and settled in Styria. Her son Stephan Görgl (born 1978) and daughter Elisabeth Görgl (born 1981) are both alpine racers who have represented Austria at the Winter Olympics. Stephan competed in the giant slalom in 2006 and Elisabeth competed in the downhill in 2006 and 2010. She won bronze in the latter, a half-century after her mother won bronze in the same event. One year later, Elisabeth became double world champion in 2011, with victories in both speed events (downhill and super G) at Garmisch. In February 2014, Elisabeth also participated in four disciplines in the 2014 Winter Olympics (downhill, giant slalom, super-G and combined).

Hecher died on 10 January 2023, at the age of 79.

== World Cup results ==
=== Season standings ===
Season	Age	Overall	Slalom	Giant slalom	Super-G	Downhill	Combined
1967	23	7	7	10	not run	9	not run

=== Race podiums ===
- 2 podiums – (1 GS, 1 SL)

Season	Date	Location	Discipline	Place
1967	1 February 1967	Monte Bondone, Italy	Slalom	3rd
1967	26 March 1967	Jackson Hole, United States	Giant slalom	3rd

== World championship results ==
Year	Age	Slalom	Giant slalom	Super-G	Downhill	Combined
1960	16	DQ2	25	not run	3	—
1962	18	12	9	not run	8	6
1964	20	DNF2	8	not run	3	—
1966	22	13		not run	16	

From 1948 through 1980, the Winter Olympics were also the World Championships for alpine skiing.
At the World Championships from 1954 through 1980, the combined was a "paper race" using the results of the three events (DH, GS, SL).
Normally held in February, the championships were in August in 1966.

== Olympic results ==
Year	Age	Slalom	Giant slalom	Super-G	Downhill	Combined
1960	16	DQ2	25	not run	3	not run
1964	20	DNF2	8	not run	3	not run
