= Skepper =

Skepper is a surname. Notable people with the surname include:

- Charles Skepper (1905–1944), British economist
- Robert Skepper (born 1938), British alpine skier
