= Christine Davy =

Australian alpine skier and pilot (1934–2026)

Christine Davy MBE
- Born: 7 August 1934; Sydney, New South Wales, Australia
- Died: 1 July 2026 (aged 91); Queanbeyan, New South Wales, Australia
- Occupations: Skier, pilot
- Known for: First Australian woman to hold a 1st Class Air Transport Pilot's Licence
- Sports career
- Sport: alpine skiing

Sports achievements and titles
- Olympic finals: 1956: downhill – 39th; 1956: giant slalom – 33rd; 1956: slalom – 37th; 1960: downhill – 27th; 1960: giant slalom – 32nd; 1960: slalom – 29th

Christine Davy MBE (7 August 1934 – 1 July 2026) was an Australian alpine skier who competed at the 1956 and 1960 Winter Olympics.

== Early life ==
Davy was born in Sydney on 7 August 1934, to Ashleigh Osborne Davy and Elizabeth Deuchar (née Gordon) of Edgecliff, New South Wales. Her father was an ear, nose and throat surgeon who received the MVO for his services to the Prince Henry, Duke of Gloucester, and his family, whilst he was Governor General of Australia. Her mother was the daughter of William Deuchar Gordon of the heritage listed rural homestead Manar House, near Braidwood. Davy was educated at Frensham School.

== Olympic record ==
In 1956, Davy came 39th, 33rd and 37th in the downhill, giant slalom and slalom respectively, out of 47, 48 and 49 entrants. In 1960, she came 27th, 32nd and 29th in the same three events, out of 46, 45 and 44 competitors.

== Pilot ==
After retiring from skiing, Davy became a pioneering female airline pilot flying the DC-3 and the Fokker Friendship with Connellan Airways out of Alice Springs. She was the first Australian woman to hold a 1st Class Air Transport Pilot's Licence. In 1963, Davy received the Nancy Bird Trophy for her service to aviation from the Australian Women Pilots' Association. In 1974, Christine Davy, MBE, became the first woman in Australia to be employed as a pilot of a passenger airline, Connair, which was based in Alice Springs NT.

== Death ==
Davy died at Queanbeyan District Hospital on 1 July 2026, at the age of 91.

== Honours ==
- Member of the Order of the British Empire — Awarded 1 January 1970 in recognition of her service to civil aviation.In 2023, she was inducted into the Australian Aviation Hall of Fame.
