= Egon Norbert Zimmermann =

Austrian alpine skier (1933–2016)

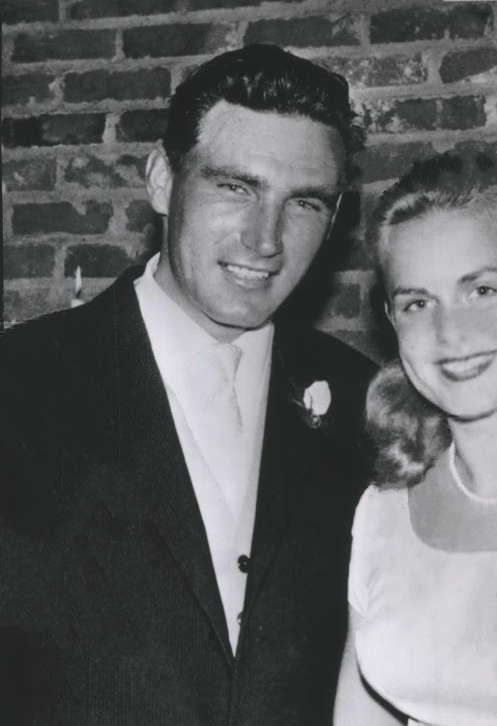
- Zimmermann and Pitou in 1961

Personal information
- Born: 19 February 1933 Innsbruck, Austria
- Died: 27 February 2016 (aged 83) Kirchbichl, Austria

Sport
- Sport: Alpine skiing

Josef Egon Norbert Zimmermann (19 February 1933 – 27 February 2016) was an Austrian alpine skier. He placed tenth in the downhill event at the 1960 Winter Olympics. He should not be confused with the fellow Olympic alpine skier Egon Zimmermann who also competed in the 1960s.

At the FIS Alpine World Ski Championships 1958 in Austria, Zimmermann met American skier Penny Pitou. They married in 1961 and had two children, living in New Hampshire, U.S. After a divorce in 1968 Zimmermann returned to Austria.
