= Edda Kainz =

Austrian alpine skier (born 1940)

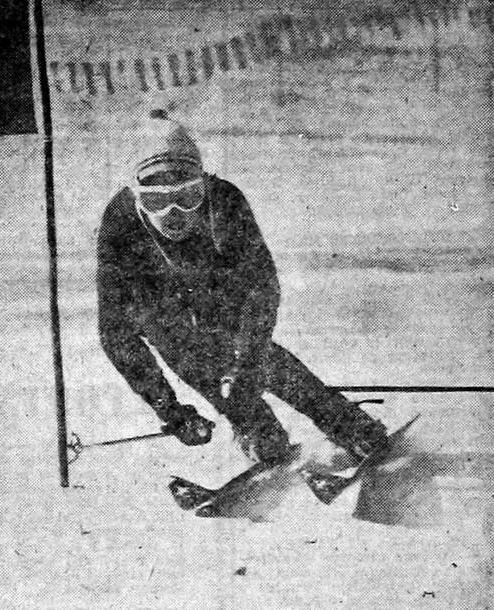
- Edda Kainz in 1965

Personal information
- Nationality: Austrian
- Born: 24 February 1940 (age 85); Immenstadt im Allgäu, Germany

Sport
- Sport: Alpine skiing

Edda Kainz (born 24 February 1940) is an Austrian alpine skier. She competed in the women's downhill at the 1964 Winter Olympics.
