= Margo Walters =

American alpine skier (1942–2024)

Personal information
- Nationality: American
- Born: March 11, 1942; St. Anthony, Idaho, United States
- Died: July 3, 2024 (aged 82); South Jordan, Utah

Sport
- Sport: Alpine skiing

Margo Walters (March 11, 1942 – July 3, 2024) was an American alpine skier. She competed in the women's downhill at the 1964 Winter Olympics.
