= Alpine skiing at the Winter Olympics =

- IOC Code: ALP
- Governing body: FIS
- Events: 10 (men: 5; women: 5)

Winter Olympics
- 1924; 1928; 1932; 1936; 1948; 1952; 1956; 1960; 1964; 1968; 1972; 1976; 1980; 1984; 1988; 1992; 1994; 1998; 2002; 2006; 2010; 2014; 2018; 2022; 2026
- Medalists

Alpine skiing has been contested at every Winter Olympics since 1936, when a combined event was held in Garmisch-Partenkirchen, Germany.

From 1948 to 1980, the Winter Olympics also served as the World Championships in Olympic years, with separate competitions held in even-numbered non-Olympic years. During this period, the Olympic medalists received an additional medal of the same metal from the International Ski Federation (FIS).

The giant slalom was introduced at the 1950 World Championships and at the Olympics in 1952; both programs dropped the combined event, but it returned in 1954 at the World Championships as a "paper" race, using the results of the slalom, giant slalom, and downhill. At the Olympics from 1956 through 1980, World Championship medals were awarded by the FIS in the combined event. It returned as a stand-alone event (one run of downhill, two runs of slalom) at the Olympics in 1988, which also debuted the one-run super-G. The combined event was run on an FIS points system at the Olympics through 1992, then was changed to the total time of the three runs. The super combined debuted in 2010, which reduced the slalom portion to one run and the event to one day.

Since 1985, the World Championships have been scheduled every odd-numbered year, independent of the Winter Olympics. At the World Championships, the combined returned as a stand-alone event in 1982 and the super-G debuted in 1987. The combined event went from points to a total time in 1996 (postponed from 1995), and changed to super combined in 2007.

The event is traditionally dominated by Alpine countries; as of 2026, Austria has a commanding lead in total medals with 132 and in gold medals with 41.

== Hosts ==
Year	City	Nation	Additional designation	Events	Best Nation
1936	Garmisch-Partenkirchen	Germany		2	Germany (1)
1948	St. Moritz	Switzerland	FIS Alpine World Ski Championships 1948	6	Switzerland (1)
1952	Oslo	Norway	FIS Alpine World Ski Championships 1952	6	Austria (1)
1956	Cortina d'Ampezzo	Italy	FIS Alpine World Ski Championships 1956	6	Austria (2)
1960	Squaw Valley	United States	FIS Alpine World Ski Championships 1960	6	Switzerland (2)
1964	Innsbruck	Austria	FIS Alpine World Ski Championships 1964	6	France (1)
1968	Grenoble	France	FIS Alpine World Ski Championships 1968	6	France (2)
1972	Sapporo	Japan	FIS Alpine World Ski Championships 1972	6	Switzerland (3)
1976	Innsbruck	Austria	FIS Alpine World Ski Championships 1976	6	West Germany (1)
1980	Lake Placid	United States	FIS Alpine World Ski Championships 1980	6	Liechtenstein (1)
1984	Sarajevo	Yugoslavia		6	United States (1)
1988	Calgary	Canada		10	Switzerland (4)
1992	Albertville	France		10	Austria (3)
1994	Lillehammer	Norway		10	Germany (2)
1998	Nagano	Japan		10	Austria (4)
2002	Salt Lake City	United States		10	Croatia (1)
2006	Torino	Italy		10	Austria (5)
2010	Vancouver	Canada		10	Germany (3)
2014	Sochi	Russia		10	Austria (6)
2018	Pyeongchang	South Korea		11	Austria (7)
2022	Beijing	China		11	Switzerland (5)
2026	Milan Cortina	Italy		10	Switzerland (6)

== Events ==
=== Men's ===
Event	24	28	32	36	48	52	56	60	64	68	72	76	80	84	88	92	94	98	02	06	10	14	18	22	26	Years
Combined				•	•										•	•	•	•	•	•	•	•	•	•		12
Team combined																									•	1
Downhill					•	•	•	•	•	•	•	•	•	•	•	•	•	•	•	•	•	•	•	•	•	21
Slalom					•	•	•	•	•	•	•	•	•	•	•	•	•	•	•	•	•	•	•	•	•	21
Giant slalom						•	•	•	•	•	•	•	•	•	•	•	•	•	•	•	•	•	•	•	•	20
Super-G															•	•	•	•	•	•	•	•	•	•	•	11
Total events				1	3	3	3	3	3	3	3	3	3	3	3	5	5	5	5	5	5	5	5	5	5	5

=== Women's ===
Event	24	28	32	36	48	52	56	60	64	68	72	76	80	84	88	92	94	98	02	06	10	14	18	22	26	Years
Combined				•	•										•	•	•	•	•	•	•	•	•	•		12
Team combined																									•	1
Downhill					•	•	•	•	•	•	•	•	•	•	•	•	•	•	•	•	•	•	•	•	•	21
Slalom					•	•	•	•	•	•	•	•	•	•	•	•	•	•	•	•	•	•	•	•	•	21
Giant slalom						•	•	•	•	•	•	•	•	•	•	•	•	•	•	•	•	•	•	•	•	20
Super-G															•	•	•	•	•	•	•	•	•	•	•	11
Total events				1	3	3	3	3	3	3	3	3	3	3	3	5	5	5	5	5	5	5	5	5	5	5

=== Mixed ===
Event	24	28	32	36	48	52	56	60	64	68	72	76	80	84	88	92	94	98	02	06	10	14	18	22	26	Years
Team event																							•	•		2
Total events																							1	1		1

== Medal table ==
NOCs in italics no longer compete at the Winter Olympics.
Sources (after the 2022 Winter Olympics):
Accurate as of 2026 Winter Olympics.

Rank	Nation	Gold	Silver	Bronze	Total
1	Austria	41	46	45	132
2	Switzerland	31	26	27	84
3	United States	19	22	11	52
4	France	16	18	18	52
5	Italy	16	12	13	41
6	Germany^{[a]}	12	10	7	29
7	Norway	11	15	16	42
8	Sweden	8	3	10	21
9	Croatia	4	6	0	10
10	Canada	4	1	7	12
11	West Germany^{[a]}	3	5	1	9
12	Slovenia	2	3	3	8
13	Liechtenstein	2	2	6	10
14	United Team of Germany^{[a]}	2	1	2	5
15	Czech Republic	1	0	1	2
15	Spain	1	0	1	2
17	Brazil	1	0	0	1
17	Slovakia	1	0	0	1
19	Luxembourg	0	2	0	2
19	Yugoslavia	0	2	0	2
21	Finland	0	1	0	1
21	Japan	0	1	0	1
21	New Zealand	0	1	0	1
21	Russia	0	1	0	1
25	Australia	0	0	1	1
25	Czechoslovakia	0	0	1	1
25	Soviet Union	0	0	1	1
Totals (27 entries)		175	178	171	524

- ^[a] Germany has competed at the Winter Olympic Games under various names; all of which are listed separately. Banned from the 1948 games (as was Japan), they competed as Germany in 1952, though only represented by West Germany. From 1956 through 1964, they were known as the United Team of Germany (EUA), which included East Germany, the German Democratic Republic (GDR). From 1968 through 1988, separate Olympic teams were fielded and West Germany competed as the Federal Republic of Germany (FRG). East Germany had only one competitor in alpine skiing (Eberhard Riedel in 1968), who did not win a medal. Following the reunification of 1990, they have competed at the Olympics as Germany, starting in 1992. Through 2018, Germany has a total of 40 medals in alpine skiing (17 gold, 13 silver, 10 bronze).

Notes

- 2 bronze medals awarded at 1948 men's downhill event
- 2 silver medals and no bronze were awarded at 1964 women's giant slalom event
- 2 silver medals and no bronze were awarded at 1992 women's giant slalom event
- 2 silver medals and no bronze were awarded at 1998 men's super-G event
- 2 gold medals and no silver were awarded at 2014 women's downhill event
- 2 bronze medals awarded at 2014 men's super-G event

== Participating nations ==
Nation	24	28	32	36	48	52	56	60	64	68	72	76	80	84	88	92	94	98	02	06	10	14	18	22	26	Years
Albania																				1	1	1	2	1	4	6
Algeria																4				1						2
Andorra												5	3	2	4	5	6	3	3	2	4	4	3	2	5	12
Argentina					6	8		5	6	5	2	5	6	10	10	6	9	1	5	5	5	6	2	2	3	20
Armenia																		1	2	1	2	1	1	1	1	8
Australia						3	5	3	5	1	2	5	4	3	3	2	2	1	10	4	2	5	3	3	3	20
Austria				4	14	11	11	13	11	13	13	12	12	13	17	20	20	19	20	20	20	20	22	22	22	22
Azerbaijan																			1		2	1	1		1	5
Belarus																		1			2	2	2	1		5
Belgium				4	2	2	1		1		1	2	2	3			1				3		4	3	3	14
Bolivia							1						3	3	6	5							1	1		7
Bosnia and Herzegovina																	2	2	2	2	3	3	2	3	3	9
Brazil																7	1	1	2	2	2	2	1	1	3	10
Bulgaria				3	2	4	3	3	1	1	2	5	4	4	4	3	2	5	3	4	3	4	3	3	3	22
Canada				7	5	9	5	9	9	11	8	8	7	11	18	10	11	8	11	16	21	15	14	13	13	22
Cayman Islands																					1	1				2
Chile					4	3	3	5	5	4		5		4	5	5	3	3	4	7	3	3	3	2	2	19
China													2	5		2				2	2	2	2	4	2	9
Chinese Taipei											4	1		2	5	3							2	2	2	8
Colombia																					1		1	1		3
Costa Rica													1	2	2	4										4
Croatia																1	1	4	4	11	10	8	10	6	6	10
Cyprus													3	5	3	4	1	1	1	1	2	1	1	1	2	13
Czech Republic																		2	9	10	8	8	9	8	8	8
Czechoslovakia				7	6		4		2	3		4	2	4	5	4										10
Denmark																2	1	3			3	1	2	1	2	8
East Germany										1																1
Timor-Leste																						1	1	1		3
Egypt														1												1
Eritrea																							1	1	1	3
Estonia				1													1			2	2	2	2	2	1	8
Fiji																			1							1
Finland					2	4	2		2	2		1			1		2	5	4	4	4	4	2	4	6	16
France				3	13	8	13	10	11	11	12	12	7	14	18	19	17	18	18	17	22	17	22	18	16	22
Georgia																	2	3	2	1	3	3	2	2	2	9
Ghana																					1			1		2
Germany				8		11										14	14	7	9	6	9	7	14	14	9	12
Great Britain				8	13	7	14	8	11	10	8	10	9	8	12	12	6	6	6	6	4	2	4	4	3	22
Greece				1	1	3	3		3	2	3	2	3	4	3	3	1	2	2	2	3	3	2	2	2	21
Guatemala															4											1
Hungary				4	7	2			1					1		6	5	3	2	2	3	3	4	2	2	15
Iceland					3	4	5	3	3	4		6	3	3	2	3	3	7	6	5	4	4	2	2	3	20
Individual Neutral Athletes																									3	1
India									1	1					3	2				2	1	1		1	1	9
Iran							3		4	4	4	4						1	1	1	3	3	2	2	2	13
Ireland																		1	2	2	2	2	2	2	2	8
Israel																				1	1		1	2	2	5
Italy				8	8	10	13	10	11	10	8	12	14	12	11	18	20	22	22	22	21	19	20	16	21	22
Japan				3		2	2	4	5	7	10	4	4	4	6	6	5	10	6	8	2	2	4	3	2	21
Kazakhstan																	2	2	2	2	2	3	2	2	2	9
Kenya																							1		1	2
Kosovo																							1	2	2	3
Kyrgyzstan																				1	1	1	1	1	1	6
Latvia				3														2	1	2	3	5	2	2	3	9
Lebanon					2	1	3	2	4	3	1	1	3	4	4	4			2	2	3	2	2	2	1	17
Liechtenstein				2	5		6	3	3	6	3	5	5	8	9	6	7	6	6	4	2	2	2	1	2	21
Lithuania																		1		1	1	2	2	2	2	7
Luxembourg				1											1	1	1						1	2	2	7
North Macedonia																		2	1	2	1	1	1	1	2	8
Madagascar																				1			1	2	2	4
Malaysia																							1	2	1	3
Malta																						1	1	1	1	4
Mexico														1	4	10	1				1	1	2	2	2	9
Moldova																					2	1	1			3
Monaco														1	1		1			2	1	3	2	1	1	9
Montenegro																					1	2	2	2	1	5
Morocco										5				4	3	9					1	2	1	1	1	9
Netherlands				1		3																		2		3
New Zealand						3		4		6	2	5	5	6	3	2	3	1	3	3	2	1	3	1	1	18
North Korea																2							3			2
Norway				7	10	12	10	5	6	7	7	3	7	1	3	11	12	12	12	7	6	10	11	14	16	22
Olympic Athletes from Russia																							5			1
Pakistan																					1	1	1	1	1	5
Peru																					2	2		1		3
Philippines											2					1							1	1	2	5
Poland				3	5	9	8		4	2	1	2		3	1	3	1	1	1	3	1	6	3	6	3	20
Portugal						1											1					2	1	2	2	6
Puerto Rico															6			1					1	1		4
Romania				4	7	7	4			2	2	2		3	1	3	2		1	2	3	3	2	2	2	18
ROC																								7		1
Russia																	6	7	5	6	5	9				6
Republic of China																								7		1
San Marino												2		2	4	2	1		1	1	1	2	1	2	1	12
Senegal														14		2	1			1	1					5
Serbia																					3	2	3	2	1	5
Serbia and Montenegro																		2	2	3						3
Slovakia																	1		3	6	3	9	7	5	4	8
Slovenia																11	10	15	17	11	13	7	11	11	8	10
South Africa																		1	1	1	1		1		2	6
South Korea								1	2	1			1	3	4	2	1	2	5	4	3	5	4	3	3	16
Soviet Union							8	3	7	7	4	2	5	4	3											9
Spain				2	6	4	4	4	6	7	3	4	5	5	6	10	7	4	3	4	5	5	2	3	2	22
Swaziland																1										1
Sweden				1	6	9	8		4	6	4	4	6	8	12	8	11	7	9	13	13	12	10	8	7	21
Switzerland				2	16	12	14	12	13	12	12	13	14	13	17	21	21	16	17	12	14	19	22	22	22	20
Tajikistan																			1	1	1	1				4
Thailand																						2	2	2	1	4
Togo																						1				1
Turkey				4	4		4	2	5	7		4		4	4	4		1	1	2	2	2	2	2	2	18
Ukraine																	2	2	2	2	3	2	2	2	2	9
Unified Team																7										1
United States				8	13	12	11	14	12	13	13	14	13	11	17	20	22	22	22	17	20	19	22	17	16	22
United Team of Germany							11	10	10																	3
Uruguay																		1							1	2
Uzbekistan																		1	2	1	2	2	1	1	1	8
Venezuela																						1				1
Virgin Islands															1	2						1				3
West Germany										13	11	13	13	12	17											6
Zimbabwe																						1				1
Yugoslavia				4	7	2	4		6	4	1	4	8	13	9	9										12
Nations				26	25	28	29	22	31	33	27	33	30	42	43	50	45	49	57	60	71	74	80	77	86	
Alpine skiers				103	174		183	133	174	188	144	181	174	225	271	321	250	249	278	287	309	327	322	306	306	
Year	24	28	32	36	48	52	56	60	64	68	72	76	80	84	88	92	94	98	02	06	10	14	18	22	26	

=== Medals per year ===
Key

NOC did not exist or did not participate in alpine skiing events	#	Number of medals won by the NOC	–	NOC did not win any medals

- bolded numbers indicate the highest medal count at that year's Olympic Games.

Nation	24	28	32	36	48	52	56	60	64	68	72	76	80	84	88	92	94	98	02	06	10	14	18	22	26	Total
Australia						–	–	–	–	–	–	–	–	–	–	–	–	1	–	–	–	–	–	–	–	1
Austria				–	6	7	9	5	7	5	4	2	4	1	6	8	3	11	9	14	4	9	7	7	4	132
Brazil																–	–	–	–	–	–	–	–	–	1	1
Canada				–	–	–	1	1	–	2	–	1	1	–	2	1	1	–	–	–	–	1	–	1	–	12
Croatia																–	–	–	4	3	2	1	–	–	–	10
Czechoslovakia				–	–		–		–	–		–	–	1	–	–										1
Czech Republic																		–	–	–	1	–	1	–	–	2
Finland					–	–	–		–	–		–			–		–	–	–	1	–	–	–	–	–	1
France				1	5	–	–	3	6	8	2	1	1	3	2	3	–	2	4	2	–	2	3	3	1	52
Germany				4		4										1	4	6	1	–	3	3	–	1	2	29
Italy				–	–	2	–	1	–	–	3	4	–	1	2	5	4	2	3	–	1	2	2	4	5	41
Japan				–		–	1	–	–	–	–	–	–	–	–	–	–	–	–	–	–	–	–	–	–	1
Liechtenstein				–	–		–	–	–	–	–	2	4	2	1	–	–	–	–	–	–	–	1	–	–	10
Luxembourg				–											–	2	–						–	–	–	2
New Zealand						–		–		–	–	–	–	–	–	1	–	–	–	–	–	–	–	–	–	1
Norway				1	–	3	–	–	–	–	–	–	–	–	–	4	5	4	4	1	4	3	7	4	2	42
Russia																	1	–	–	–	–	–				1
Slovenia																–	3	–	–	–	2	2	–	1	–	8
Slovakia																		–	–	–	–	–	–	1	–	1
Soviet Union							1	–	–	–	–	–	–	–	–	–										1
Spain				–	–	–	–	–	–	–	1	–	–	–	–	1	–	–	–	–	–	–	–	–	–	2
Sweden				–	–	–	1		–	–	–	1	2	–	1	1	1	1	2	4	2	–	2	1	2	21
Switzerland				–	6	–	4	2	–	3	6	3	3	4	11	1	4	2	1	3	3	3	7	9	9	84
United Team of Germany							1	3	1																	5
United States				–	2	2	–	3	4	–	2	1	1	5	–	2	4	1	2	2	8	5	3	1	4	52
West Germany										–	–	3	2	–	4											9
Yugoslavia				–	–	–	–		–	–	–	–	–	1	1	–										2
Year	24	28	32	36	48	52	56	60	64	68	72	76	80	84	88	92	94	98	02	06	10	14	18	22	26	–

== Age records ==
- Federica Brignone (35 years 213 days) oldest gold medalist in Olympic alpine skiing; gold in super-G in 2026.
- André Myhrer (35 years 42 days) oldest male gold medalist in Olympic alpine skiing; gold in slalom in 2018.
- Johan Clarey (41) oldest medalist in Olympic alpine skiing; silver in downhill in 2022.
- Michela Figini (17) youngest gold medalist in Olympic alpine skiing; gold in downhill in 1984.
- Toni Sailer (20) youngest male gold medalist in Olympic alpine skiing; won slalom, giant slalom, and downhill in 1956.
- Traudl Hecher (16) youngest medalist in Olympic alpine skiing; bronze in downhill in 1960.
- Henrik Kristoffersen (19) youngest male medalist in Olympic alpine skiing; bronze in slalom in 2014.

== See also ==
- Alpine skiing at the Winter Paralympics
- Alpine skiing at the Youth Olympic Games
- Alpine Skiing World Cup
- FIS Alpine World Ski Championships
- List of FIS Alpine World Ski Championships medalists
- World Para Alpine Skiing Championships
- List of Olympic venues in alpine skiing
