= Rosemarie Reichenbach =

Swiss alpine skier (born 1935)

Personal information
- Nationality: Swiss
- Born: 26 April 1935 (age 89); Gstaad, Switzerland

Sport
- Sport: Alpine skiing

Rosemarie Reichenbach (born 26 April 1935) is a Swiss alpine skier. She competed in the women's downhill at the 1956 Winter Olympics.
