= Christine Terraillon =

French alpine skier (born 1943)

Personal information
- Nationality: French
- Born: 16 September 1943; Ponnetier, France
- Died: 27 September 2023 (aged 80)

Sport
- Sport: Alpine skiing

Christine Terraillon (16 September 1943 – 27 September 2023) was a French alpine skier. She competed in the women's downhill at the 1964 Winter Olympics.
