= Starr Walton =

American alpine skier (born 1942)

Personal information
- Nationality: American
- Born: May 13, 1942 (age 82); Yuba City, California, United States

Sport
- Sport: Alpine skiing

Starr Walton (born May 13, 1942) is an American alpine skier. She competed in the women's downhill at the 1964 Winter Olympics.
