= Charles Bozon =

French alpine skier (1932–1964)

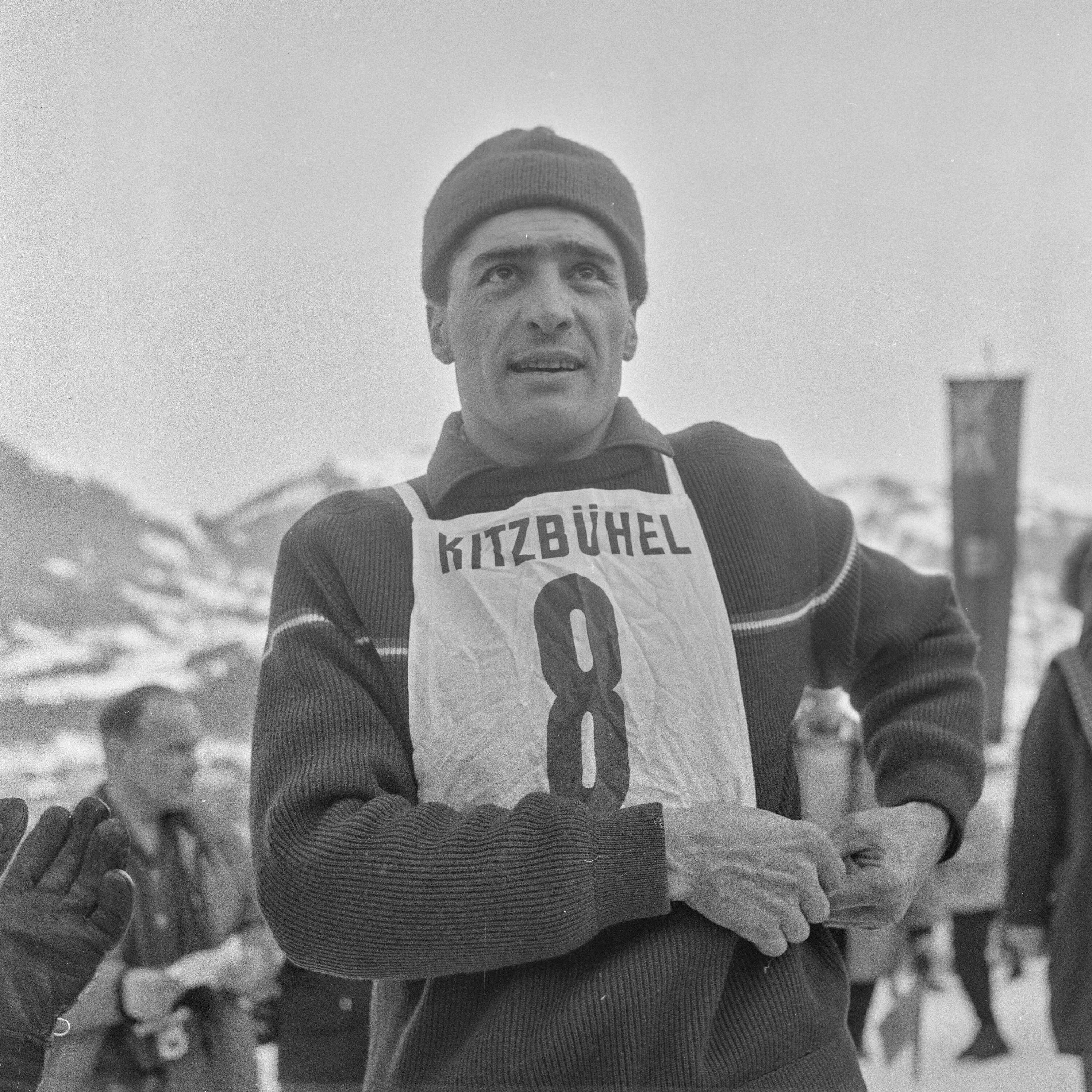
- Bozon at the 1962 Hahnenkamm Races

Personal information
- Born: 15 December 1932 Chamonix, France
- Died: 7 July 1964 (aged 31) Aiguille Verte, France

Skiing career
- Sport: Alpine skiing
- Club: Chamonix
- Disciplines: Downhill, giant slalom slalom, combined

Olympics
- Teams: 2 – (1956, 1960)
- Medals: 1 (0 gold)

World Championships
- Teams: 4 – (1956, 1958, 1960, 1962) includes Olympics
- Medals: 4 (1 gold)
Medal record
Men's alpine skiing
Representing France
Olympic Games
Silver medal – second place	1956 Cortina	Combined
Silver medal – second place	1960 Squaw Valley	Combined
Bronze medal – third place	1960 Squaw Valley	Slalom
World Championships
Gold medal – first place	1962 Chamonix	Slalom

Charles Bozon Jr. (15 December 1932 – 7 July 1964) was an alpine ski racer and world champion from France.

== Career ==
Born in Chamonix, Haute-Savoie, Bozon won a gold medal in the slalom at the 1962 World Championships, held at his hometown of Chamonix in a snowstorm. Earlier, he had won a bronze medal in the slalom at the 1960 Winter Olympics in Squaw Valley, California, and two world championship silver medals in the combined in 1956 and 1960. Bozon suffered fractured vertebra in the giant slalom at the world championships in 1958 and vowed not to compete again. He did not compete in the Olympics in 1964.

== Death ==
Bozon died in 1964 at age 31 in a mountain climbing accident near Mont Blanc. He and 13 climbing companions were killed in an avalanche on the Aiguille Verte, a 4,122-metre (13,524 ft) mountain in the Mont Blanc massif. The climbing party had reached an elevation of about 2,700 m (9,000 ft) when the avalanche occurred. Bozon's father, Charles, Sr., had died on the same slope in an avalanche in 1938.

Less than three months earlier, an avalanche in Switzerland claimed the lives of two noted alpine racers, Buddy Werner of the U.S. and Barbi Henneberger of West Germany.
