= John Moore (skier) =

British skier (1933–2017)

Personal information
- Full name: John Arthur George Moore
- Nationality: British
- Born: 18 May 1933 Aldershot, England
- Died: 26 August 2017 (aged 84) Cornwall, England

Sport
- Sport: Biathlon, cross-country skiing
Medal record
Commonwealth Winter Games
Gold medal – first place	1962 St Moritz	Cross Country - Men's 15K Classical

John Arthur George Moore (18 May 1933 – 26 August 2017) was a British skier. He competed at the 1956 Winter Olympics, the 1960 Winter Olympics and the 1964 Winter Olympics. Moore died in Cornwall on 26 August 2017, at the age of 84.
