= René Mandrillon =

French cross-country skier (1928–1970)

René Mandrillon (born 28 August 1928 in Lamoura, Jura, France – 3 March 1970 in Lamoura) was a French cross-country skier who competed in the 1950s. He finished 18th in the 18 km event at the 1952 Winter Olympics in Oslo.
