= Maria Grazia Marchelli =

Italian alpine skier (1932–2006)

Personal information
- Nationality: Italian
- Born: 1 June 1932; Genoa, Italy
- Died: 26 June 2006 (aged 74); Milan, Italy

Sport
- Sport: Alpine skiing

Maria Grazia Marchelli (1 June 1932 – 26 June 2006) was an Italian alpine skier. She competed at the 1952 Winter Olympics and the 1956 Winter Olympics.

She was the sister of the skier Carla Marchelli.
