= Victor Arbez =

French skier (1934–2016)

Personal information
- Full name: Victor Jean Etienne Arbez
- Nationality: French
- Born: 17 May 1934; Bellefontaine, France
- Died: 22 January 2016 (aged 81); Saint-Claude, France

Sport
- Sport: Biathlon, cross-country skiing

Victor Arbez (17 May 1934 – 22 January 2016) was a French skier. He competed at the 1956, 1960, 1964 and the 1968 Winter Olympics.
