= Jean Mermet =

French cross-country skier (born 1932)

Jean Mermet (born 22 January 1932) was a French cross-country skier who competed in the 1950s. Competing in three Winter Olympics in the 4 x 10 km relay, his best finish was fourth at Oslo in 1952.
