= Norman Shutt =

British biathlete (1929–2022)

Personal information
- Full name: Norman L. Shutt
- Nationality: British
- Born: 9 November 1929
- Died: 19 February 2022 (aged 92)

Sport
- Sport: Biathlon

Norman L. Shutt (9 November 1929 – 19 February 2022) was a British biathlete. He competed in the 20 km individual event at the 1960 Winter Olympics. Shutt died on 19 February 2022, at the age of 92.
