= Terry Monaghan =

British speed skater

Personal information
- Full name: Terence Austin Monaghan
- Nationality: British
- Born: 26 August 1933 (age 91); Mountain Ash, Wales

Sport
- Sport: Speed skating

Terence Austin Monaghan (born 26 August 1933) is a British speed skater. He competed in four events at the 1960 Winter Olympics. He represented Great Britain in the European and World championships between 1956 and 1962. He broke the world record of Hjalmar Andersen on the 10 km which was realized in 1952.Unfortunately for Terry Monaghan some other skaters improved his time. So in the end he became 5th in these Olympic Games and the new world record went to Knut Johannessen.

== Biography ==
Terry loved his roller skates when he was a kid and moved to inline roller skates only for fun. But in 1941, he saw the movie Sun Valley Serenade, fell in love with Sonja Henie at 8 years old and decided that he wanted to go to Norway and ice skate. His interest developed from there. His dad died when he was a young teenager, so when his mom found out he loved skating, she bought him a season pass to the ice rink. She wanted to keep him off the streets and away from hanging out with the wrong crowd.He was skating at ages 14 and 15, since you had to 16 to be on the team. Though he had no coach, he was racing all over different towns in England and Scotland with the Bournemouth Speed Skating Team. When he was about 16, he jumped over a fallen skater in a race and was told he was skating dangerously.this lead him to be expelled from the club for two weeks. This put him out of the running for the championship half-mile race in which he was the favorite. When some others heard what had happened, they got together and sent him up to Wembley to the half-mile championships of Great Britain instead of the local championships and he made the finals.

He was 26 when he competed for the Great Britain in the 1960 Winter Olympics in Squaw Valley. Though he knew he wasn't going to win, he was thankful to be there for the experience.

He worked at the ice arena as a ski instructor in Squaw Valley, during the first feast in 1961. He went to church in 1963 and was baptized. He gave up speed skating because it was his idle. At age 76 years, he was skating on coastal roads and came down a steep Oregon coastal road. He said it was fun but that was the last time he skated.
