= André Kouprianoff =

French speed skater

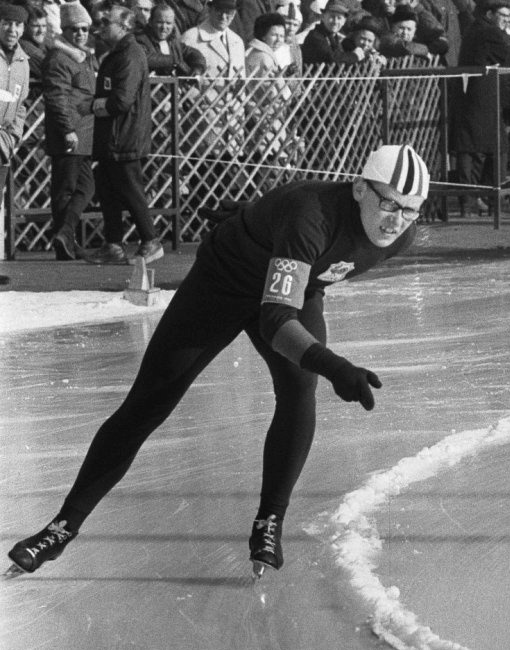
- André Kouprianoff in 1964

Personal information
- Born: 14 October 1938 (age 87) Paris, France
- Height: 1.69 m (5 ft 7 in)
- Weight: 65 kg (143 lb)

Sport
- Sport: Speed skating
- Club: Club Olympic Vitesse
Medal record
Representing France
World Speed Skating Championships
Silver medal – second place	1960 Davos	All-round
European Speed Skating Championships
Bronze medal – third place	1961 Helsinki	All-round
Silver medal – second place	1962 Oslo	All-round

André Kouprianoff (born 19 October 1938) is a retired French speed skater who won three all-round medals at the European and world championships in 1960–1962. He competed at the 1960 and 1964 Winter Olympics in 500 m to 10,000 m distances with the best achievement of eighth place in 1,500 m in 1960.

Personal bests:

- 500 m – 41.5 (1960)
- 1500 m – 2:11.4 (1964)
- 5000 m – 8:03.9 (1962)
- 10000 m – 16:39.1 (1960)
