= Robert Skepper =

British alpine skier (born 1938)

Personal information
- Nationality: British
- Born: 3 April 1938 (age 87)

Sport
- Sport: Alpine skiing

Robert Braeme Skepper (born 3 April 1938) is a British alpine skier.

== Career ==
He competed in three events at the 1960 Winter Olympics. Charles Palmer-Tomkinson competed at the same time, in the early 1960s.

== Personal life ==
His father died on September 22 1962 in France. He was godparent to the child of John Julian Sheffield, the grandson of Sir Berkeley Sheffield, and Viscount Garmoyle (Simon Cairns, 6th Earl Cairns).

He married Hannah Margaret Backhouse in 1968, of Kirby-le-Soken in Essex; her great-grandfather was Sir Jonathan Backhouse. They had three daughters in 1969, and 1976 (his daughter died on July 8 1996, aged 19, from malaria when in Namibia) and 1988, and a son in April 1971.

His eldest brother's daughter is Catrina Skepper (born May 1962), who in the mid-1980s appeared in a Cadbury Flake advert, featured in a canoe. Catrina's father also skied competitively internationally for the University of Cambridge, in the 1950s. His sister, Gillian Mary Skepper, from Neuilly-sur-Seine, married Sir Adrian Cadbury on Saturday 16 June 1956 at St Paul's Church, Knightsbridge; Sir Adrian Cadbury had been an Olympic rower in 1952.

== Arms ==
Coat of arms of Robert Skepper
Notes Granted to Edmund Drane Skepper Adopted 1958 Crest In Front of a Fleur de Lys Azure a Greyhound Courant Or. Escutcheon Ermine on Chevron Flor at the point Gules three Roses Or all within a Bordure of the last.
