= Jolanda Schir =

Italian alpine skier (born 1943)

Personal information
- Nationality: Italian
- Born: 15 January 1943 (age 82); Folgaria, Italy

Sport
- Sport: Alpine skiing

Jolanda Schir (born 15 January 1943) is an Italian alpine skier. She competed in two events at the 1960 Winter Olympics. She is the sister of the other skier Jerta Schir.
