= Skeeter Werner Walker =

American alpine skier (1933–2001)

Personal information
- Full name: Gladys Maxine Werner (-Walker)
- Born: December 22, 1933 Steamboat Springs, Colorado, U.S.
- Died: July 20, 2001 (aged 67) Steamboat Springs, Colorado

Sport
- Sport: Skiing

Gladys Maxine "Skeeter" Werner Walker (December 22, 1933 – July 20, 2001) was an alpine ski racer and Olympian from the United States.

== Biography ==
Born and raised in Steamboat Springs, Colorado, "Skeeter" Werner learned to ski and race at Howelsen Hill. An alternate for the 1952 Olympic team, she was youngest member of the U.S. Ski Team at the 1954 World Championships and the U.S. Olympic team in 1956. Werner retired from competition in 1958, and modeled and designed fashions in New York. She returned to Steamboat Springs in 1962 and opened a ski shop with her younger brothers Wallace ("Buddy" 1936–64) and Loris ("Bugs" b.1941), also Olympians. She later founded the Steamboat Ski School.

In 1966, one of her ski school students was Doak Walker, a famous NFL running back (and winner of the Heisman Trophy in 1948). They eloped in 1969 to Las Vegas and lived together in Steamboat Springs for the rest of their lives. He died in 1998 at age 71, eight months after a ski accident left him paralyzed. She died of cancer in July 2001, at age 67.
