= Jeanne Sandford =

British alpine skier (1929–2018)

Personal information
- Full name: Jean Ethel Sandford
- Nationality: British
- Born: 30 September 1929
- Died: 11 June 2018 (aged 88); Wiltshire, England

Sport
- Sport: Alpine skiing

Jean Ethel "Jeanne" Sandford (30 September 1929 – 11 June 2018) was a British alpine skier. She competed in two events at the 1956 Winter Olympics.

Sandford died in Wiltshire on 11 June 2018, at the age of 88.
