= Anne-Marie Leduc =

French alpine skier (born 1937)

Personal information
- Nationality: French
- Born: 18 March 1937 (age 89) Ventron, France

Sport
- Sport: Alpine skiing

Anne-Marie Leduc (born 18 March 1937) is a French alpine skier. She competed in two events at the 1960 Winter Olympics.
