= Marían Navarro =

Spanish alpine skier (born 1941)

Personal information
- Nationality: Spanish
- Born: 27 May 1941 (age 85)

Sport
- Sport: Alpine skiing

Marían Navarro (born 27 May 1941) is a Spanish alpine skier. She competed in three events at the 1960 Winter Olympics.
