= Madeleine Front =

French alpine skier (1930–2016)

Personal information
- Full name: Madeleine Eugénie Francette Benier
- Nationality: French
- Born: 22 April 1930; Albertville, France
- Died: 26 December 2016 (aged 86); Albertville, France

Sport
- Sport: Alpine skiing

Madeleine Front (22 April 1930 – 26 December 2016) was a French alpine skier. She competed in two events at the 1956 Winter Olympics.
