= Liselotte Michel =

Swiss alpine skier (born 1939)

Personal information
- Nationality: Swiss
- Born: 4 May 1939 (age 87) Unterseen, Switzerland

Sport
- Sport: Alpine skiing

Liselotte Michel (born 4 May 1939) is a Swiss alpine skier. She competed in three events at the 1960 Winter Olympics.
