= Jerta Schir =

Italian alpine skier (born 1938)

Personal information
- Nationality: Italian
- Born: 12 June 1938 (age 86); Folgaria, Italy

Sport
- Sport: Alpine skiing

Jerta Schir (born 12 June 1938) is an Italian alpine skier. She competed in three events at the 1960 Winter Olympics. She is the sister of the other skier Jolanda Schir.
