= Lyubov Volkova =

Soviet alpine skier (1932–2015)

Personal information
- Nationality: Soviet
- Born: 15 October 1932
- Died: 16 August 2015 (aged 82)

Sport
- Sport: Alpine skiing

Lyubov Volkova (15 October 1932 – 16 August 2015) was a Soviet alpine skier. She competed in three events at the 1960 Winter Olympics.
