= Janine Monterrain =

French alpine skier (1942–2025)

Personal information
- Nationality: French
- Born: 3 April 1942 Chamonix, France
- Died: 27 December 2025 (aged 83) Chamonix, France

Sport
- Sport: Alpine skiing

Janine Monterrain (3 April 1942 – 27 December 2025) was a French alpine skier. She competed in two events at the 1960 Winter Olympics. She died on 27 December 2025, at the age of 83.
