= Aleksandra Artyomenko =

Soviet alpine skier (1928–2010)

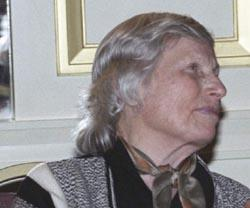
- Aleksandra Artyomenko in 2005

Personal information
- Nationality: Soviet
- Born: 14 January 1928 Artyomovsk, Russian SFSR, Soviet Union
- Died: 25 September 2010 (aged 82) Almaty, Kazakhstan

Sport
- Sport: Alpine skiing

Aleksandra Artyomenko (14 January 1928 – 25 September 2010) was a Soviet alpine skier. She competed in three events at the 1956 Winter Olympics.
