= Josephine Gibbs =

British alpine skier (born 1938)

Personal information
- Nationality: British
- Born: 21 May 1938 (age 88) Worcester, England

Sport
- Sport: Alpine skiing

Josephine Gibbs (born 21 May 1938) is a British alpine skier. She competed in three events at the 1960 Winter Olympics.
