= FIS Alpine World Ski Championships 1962 =

Skiing event in Chamonix, France

Coordinates: 45.92°N 6.87°E

- Host city: Chamonix, Haute-Savoie
- Country: France
- Events: 8
- Opening: 10 February 1962
- Closing: 18 February 1962
- Opened by: Charles de Gaulle

Location in the Alps of Europe
Location in France

The FIS Alpine World Ski Championships 1962 were held in France from 10 to 18 February at Chamonix in Haute-Savoie.

Chamonix previously hosted the alpine world championships in 1937, and also the first Winter Olympics in 1924, but without alpine skiing, which debuted in 1936.

== Men's competitions ==
=== Downhill ===
Date: February 18

Placing	Country	Athlete	Time
1	Austria (AUT)	Karl Schranz	2:24.33
2	France (FRA)	Émile Viollat	2:24.82
3	Austria (AUT)	Egon Zimmermann	2:25.13

=== Giant slalom ===
Date: February 15

Placing	Country	Athlete	Time
1	Austria (AUT)	Egon Zimmermann	1:38.97
2	Austria (AUT)	Karl Schranz	1:39.12
3	Austria (AUT)	Martin Burger	1:39.42

=== Slalom ===
Date: February 12

Placing	Country	Athlete	Time
1	France (FRA)	Charles Bozon	2:21.67
2	France (FRA)	Guy Périllat	2:23.07
3	Austria (AUT)	Gerhard Nenning	2:24.20

=== Combined ===
Placing	Country	Athlete	Points
1	Austria (AUT)	Karl Schranz	11.04
2	Austria (AUT)	Gerhard Nenning	33.21
3	West Germany (FRG)	Ludwig Leitner	64.70

== Women's competitions ==
=== Downhill ===
Date: February 18

Placing	Country	Athlete	Time
1	Austria (AUT)	Christl Haas	2:09.08
2	Italy (ITA)	Pia Riva	2:12.31
3	United States (USA)	Barbara Ferries	2:13.76

=== Giant slalom ===
Date: February 11

Placing	Country	Athlete	Time
1	Austria (AUT)	Marianne Jahn	1:41.53
2	Austria (AUT)	Erika Netzer	1:41.60
3	United States (USA)	Joan Hannah	1:41.72

=== Slalom ===
Date: February 14

Placing	Country	Athlete	Time
1	Austria (AUT)	Marianne Jahn	1:34.84
2	France (FRA)	Marielle Goitschel	1:36.30
3	Austria (AUT)	Erika Netzer	1:38.12

=== Combined ===
Placing	Country	Athlete	Points
1	France (FRA)	Marielle Goitschel	41.13
2	Austria (AUT)	Marianne Jahn	44.78
3	Austria (AUT)	Erika Netzer	48.33

== Medals table ==
Place	Nation	Gold	Silver	Bronze	Total
1	Austria (AUT)	6	4	5	15
2	France (FRA)	2	3	–	5
3	Italy (ITA)	–	1	–	1
4	United States (USA)	–	–	2	2
5	West Germany (FRG)	–	–	1	1
