= María Cristina Schweizer =

Argentine alpine skier (1940–1994)

Personal information
- Born: 20 August 1940 Buenos Aires, Argentina
- Died: 1994 (aged 53–54)

Sport
- Sport: Alpine skiing

María Cristina Schweizer (20 August 1940 – 1994) was an Argentine alpine skier. She competed at the 1960 Winter Olympics and the 1964 Winter Olympics.
