= Pia Riva =

Italian alpine skier (born 1935)

Personal information
- Nationality: Italian
- Born: 4 April 1935 (age 91)

Sport
- Sport: Alpine skiing
Medal record
World Championship
Silver medal – second place	1962 Chamonix	Downhill

Pia Riva (born 4 April 1935) is an Italian skier. She competed in Alpine skiing at the 1960 Winter Olympics and the 1964 Winter Olympics.
