= Elizabeth Greene (alpine skier) =

Canadian alpine skier (1941–2023)

Elizabeth Constance Greene (3 February 1941 – 25 June 2023) was a Canadian alpine skier who competed in the 1960 Winter Olympics.

Greene was born in Ottawa on 3 February 1941. She died in Kamloops on 25 June 2023, at the age of 82.
