= Marit Haraldsen =

Norwegian alpine skier (born 1939)

Personal information
- Nationality: Norwegian
- Born: 25 July 1939 (age 85)

Sport
- Sport: Alpine skiing

Marit Haraldsen (born 25 July 1939) is a Norwegian alpine skier. She participated at the 1960 Winter Olympics in Squaw Valley, where she competed in downhill, slalom and giant slalom.

She became Norwegian champion in downhill in 1959.
