= Yvonne Rüegg =

Swiss alpine skier (born 1938)

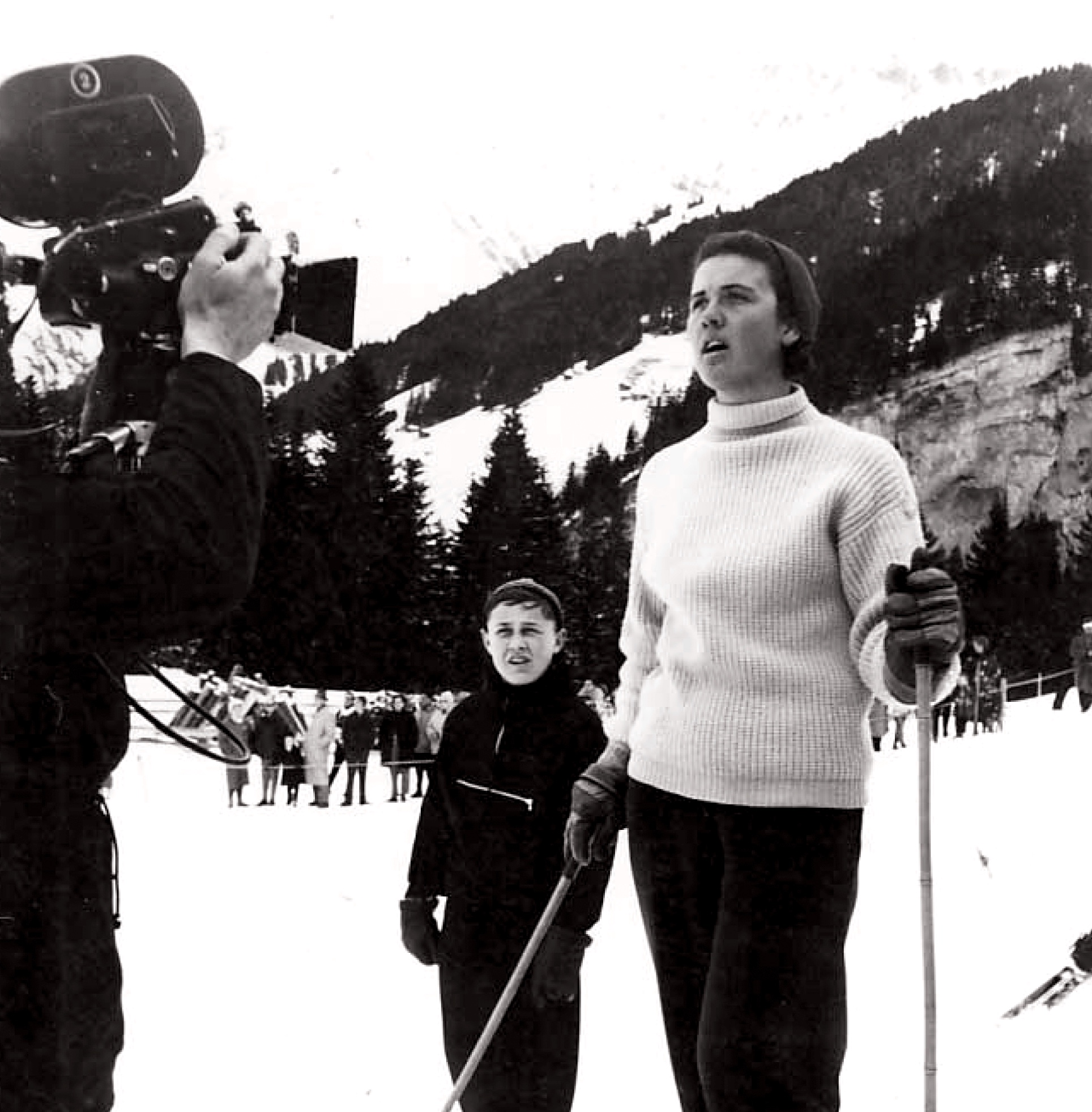

Personal information
- Nationality: SUI
- Born: 2 August 1938 (age 88) Chur, Switzerland

Sport
- Sport: Skiing
Medal record
Event	1st	2nd	3rd
Olympic Games	1	0	0
Total	1	0	0
Gold medal – first place	1960 Squaw Valley	Giant slalom

Yvonne Rüegg (born 2 August 1938) is a Swiss former alpine skier. At the 1960 Winter Olympics, she won the gold medal in giant slalom.

She was born in Chur.
