= Heidi Biebl =

German alpine skier (1941–2022)

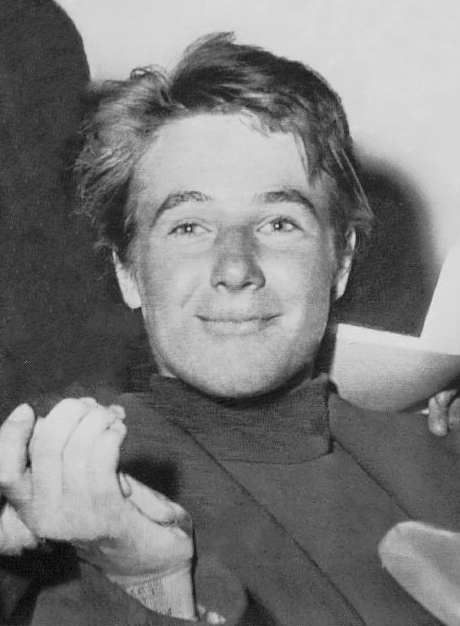
- Biebl in 1960

Personal information
- Born: 17 February 1941 Oberstaufen, Bavaria, Germany
- Died: 20 January 2022 (aged 80) Immenstadt, Bavaria, Germany
- Height: 159 cm (5 ft 3 in)
- Weight: 56 kg (123 lb)

Sport
- Sport: Alpine skiing
- Club: SC Oberstaufen

Achievements and titles
- Olympic finals: 1960, 1964
Medal record
Representing Germany
Olympic Games
Gold medal – first place	1960 Squaw Valley	Downhill

Heidi Biebl (17 February 1941 – 20 January 2022) was a German alpine skier.

== Career ==
Biebl won gold medal in the downhill at the 1960 Winter Olympics, just three days after her 19th birthday, becoming the games' youngest gold medal winner. She also competed at the 1964 Winter Olympics, finishing fourth in both the downhill and slalom events. Biebl died on 20 January 2022, at the age of 80.
