= Cecilia Womersley =

New Zealand alpine skier (born 1943)

Cecilia Ann Womersley (later Cecilia Jenkins) (born 27 July 1943) is an alpine skier from New Zealand.

She competed for New Zealand at the 1960 Winter Olympics at Squaw Valley, and came in 34th in the downhill, 27th in the giant slalom, and 38th in the slalom.

She is the sister of 1972 alpine skier Chris Womersley.
