= Arlette Grosso =

French alpine skier (born 1937)

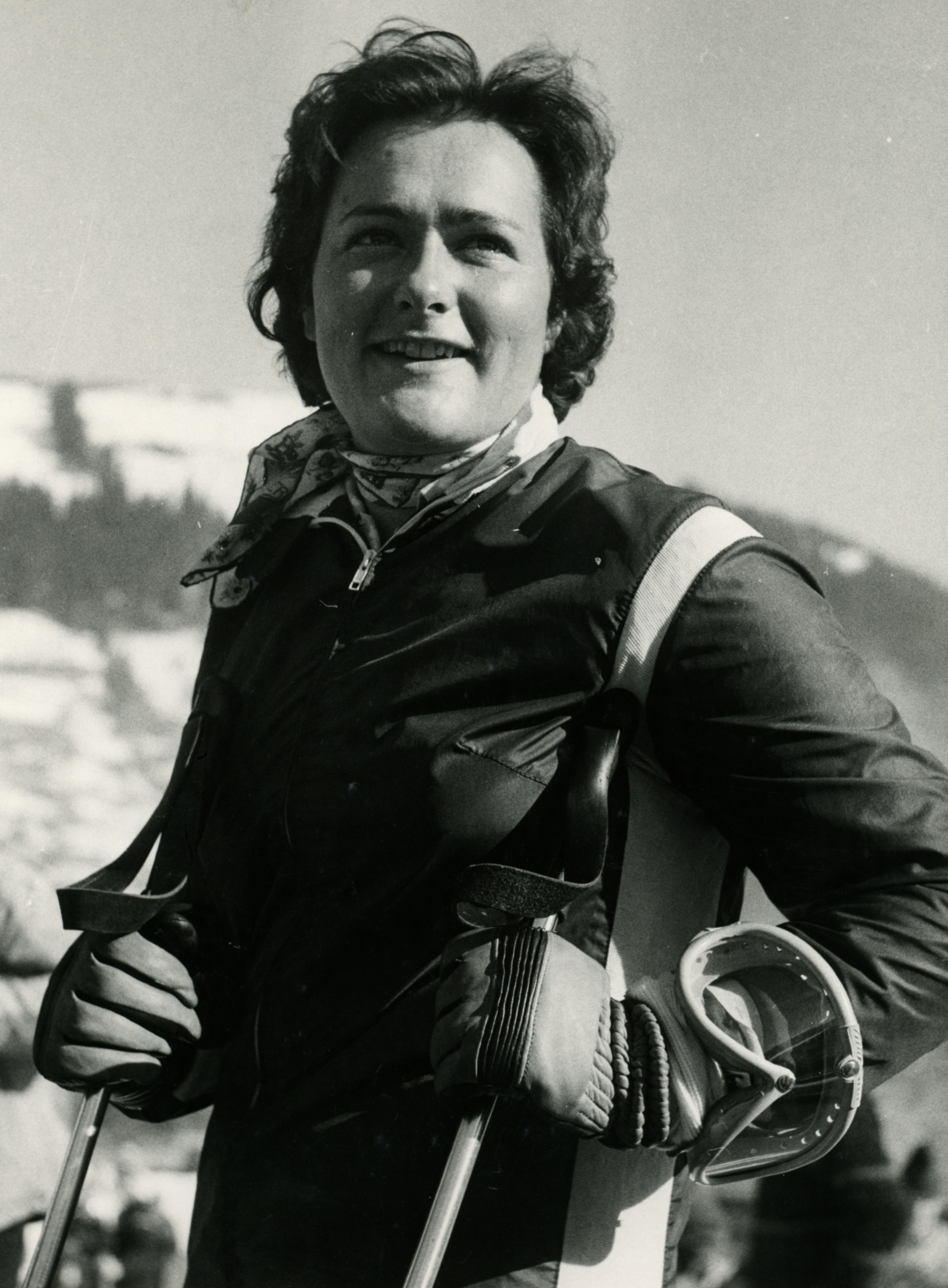

Personal information
- Nationality: French
- Born: 3 March 1937 (age 88); Haute-Savoie, France

Sport
- Sport: Alpine skiing

Arlette Grosso (born 3 March 1937) is a French alpine skier. She competed in three events at the 1960 Winter Olympics.
