= Anneliese Meggl =

German alpine skier (born 1938)

Anneliese Meggl (3 December 1938 – 28 February 2025) was a German alpine skier who competed in the 1960 Winter Olympics.
