= Liv Jagge-Christiansen =

Norwegian tennis player and alpine skier

Personal information
- Born: 25 February 1943 (age 83) Oslo, Norway

Sport
- Sport: Tennis; Alpine skiing

Liv Jagge-Christiansen (born 25 February 1943) is a Norwegian retired tennis player and alpine skier. She was born in Oslo. She participated at the 1960 Winter Olympics in Squaw Valley and at the 1964 Winter Olympics in Innsbruck, competing in downhill, slalom and giant slalom. Her best result was 7th place in slalom in 1964. She is the mother of alpinist Finn Christian Jagge. She won ten national tennis championships in double, and one in mixed double.

In 1962 she became Norwegian champion in all four alpine disciplines (slalom, giant slalom, downhill and alpine combined).
