= Wendy Farrington =

British alpine skier (born 1941)

Personal information
- Nationality: British
- Born: 1 December 1941 (age 84) Knaresborough, England

Sport
- Sport: Alpine skiing

Wendy Farrington (born 1 December 1941) is a British alpine skier. She competed at the 1960 Winter Olympics and the 1964 Winter Olympics.
