= Thérèse Leduc (alpine skier) =

French alpine skier (1934–1988)

Personal information
- Nationality: French
- Born: 25 January 1934 Ventron, France
- Died: 4 October 1988 (aged 54)

Sport
- Sport: Alpine skiing

Thérèse Leduc (25 January 1934 – 4 October 1988) was a French alpine skier. She competed in three events at the 1960 Winter Olympics.
