= Annemarie Waser =

Swiss alpine skier (born 1940)

Personal information
- Nationality: Swiss
- Born: 4 February 1940 (age 86)

Sport
- Sport: Alpine skiing

Annemarie Waser (born 4 February 1940) is a Swiss alpine skier. She competed at the 1956 Winter Olympics and the 1960 Winter Olympics.
