= Stalina Demidova-Korzukhina =

Russian alpine skier (born 1938)

Personal information
- Full name: Stalina Sergeyevna Demidova-Korzukhina
- Born: 10 February 1938 (age 88) Bobrovka, Sverdlovsk, Soviet Union
- Height: 1.58 m (5 ft 2 in)
- Weight: 58 kg (128 lb)

Sport
- Sport: Alpine skiing
- Club: Dynamo St. Petersburg

Stalina Sergeyevna Demidova-Korzukhina (Russian: Сталина Сергеевна Демидова-Корзухина, born 10 February 1938) is a retired Russian alpine skier. She competed in the downhill, slalom and giant slalom events at the 1960 and 1964 Olympics, with the best achievement of seventh place in the slalom in 1960. Between 1960 and 1963 she won 11 national titles in alpine events.

Demidova-Korzukhina graduated from the Siberian Academy of Physical Culture in Omsk, and after retiring from competition coached alpine events in Saint Petersburg.
