= Nancy Holland =

Canadian alpine skier (born 1942)

Nancy Holland (born 3 February 1942) is a Canadian former alpine skier who competed in the 1960 Winter Olympics and in the 1964 Winter Olympics.
