= Sonja Sperl =

German alpine skier (1936–2020)

Sonja Sperl (3 December 1936 – 13 August 2020) was a German alpine skier who competed in the 1956 Winter Olympics and in the 1960 Winter Olympics.
