= Carla Marchelli =

Italian alpine skier (1935–2026)

Personal information
- Nationality: Italian
- Born: 3 April 1935 Genoa, Italy
- Died: 27 August 2026 (aged 91)

Sport
- Sport: Alpine skiing

Carla Marchelli (3 April 1935 – 27 August 2026) was an Italian skier. She competed in Alpine skiing at the 1956 Winter Olympics and the 1960 Winter Olympics.

Marchelli died on 27 August 2026, at the age of 91. She was the sister of the skier Maria Grazia Marchelli.
