= Penny Pitou =

American alpine skier

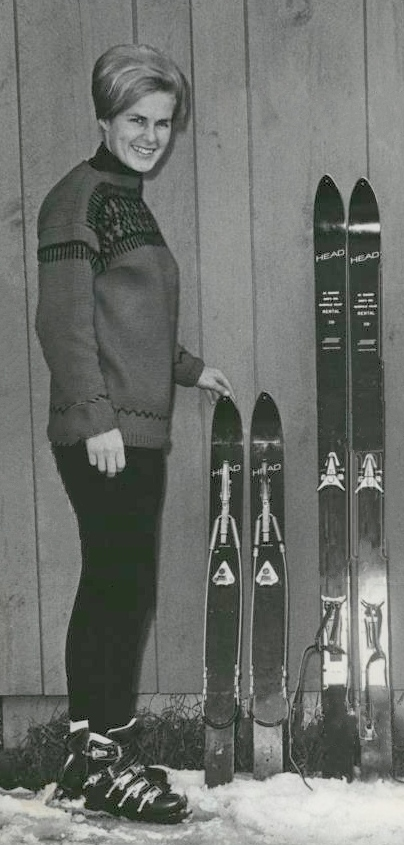
- Pitou in 1969

Personal information
- Born: October 8, 1938 (age 87) Bayside, Queens, U.S.

Sport
- Sport: Alpine skiing
- Club: Gilford Outing Club
Medal record
Representing the United States
Olympic Games
Silver medal – second place	1960 Squaw Valley	Downhill
Silver medal – second place	1960 Squaw Valley	Giant slalom

Penelope Theresa "Penny" Pitou (born October 8, 1938) is a former United States Olympic alpine skier, who in 1960 became the first American skier to win a medal in the Olympic downhill event. In 2001, Pitou was inducted into the New England Women's Sports Hall of Fame.

Pitou moved with her family from New York to Center Harbor, New Hampshire at the age of three. There she began skiing on a hill in her backyard, later progressing to the nearby Gilford Outing Club and Belknap Mountain (now Gunstock) ski areas. By the age of 15 Penny and her family moved to Laconia, New Hampshire, where she graduated from Laconia High School in 1956 and attended Middlebury College, where she was a member of the class of 1960.

As a freshman at Laconia High in 1953, she ignored the no-girls-rule and tried out for the boys' ski team. "I hid my hair under my hat and asked my friends to call me Tommy," she said. "I made the team and everything went great until I competed in a downhill race at New Hampton School. I crashed in front of a gate-keeper, my hat flew off and my hair came down. It's one of the few times in my life that I was at a loss for words."

Her ski career continued apace however, and at the age of seventeen she was first selected for the U.S. Olympics Ski Team. Her self-described Olympic mentor, 1952 double-medalist Andrea Mead Lawrence, encouraged Penny to continue working on her skiing after a disappointing performance in the 1956 Games in Italy. Her perseverance paid off in 1960, when Pitou won silver medals for second place in both the Downhill and Giant slalom events at the 1960 Olympics in Squaw Valley, California.

At the FIS Alpine World Ski Championships 1958 in Austria, Pitou met the Austrian alpine skier Egon N. Zimmermann. They married in 1961, had two children, and settled in New Hampshire. The couple divorced in 1968.

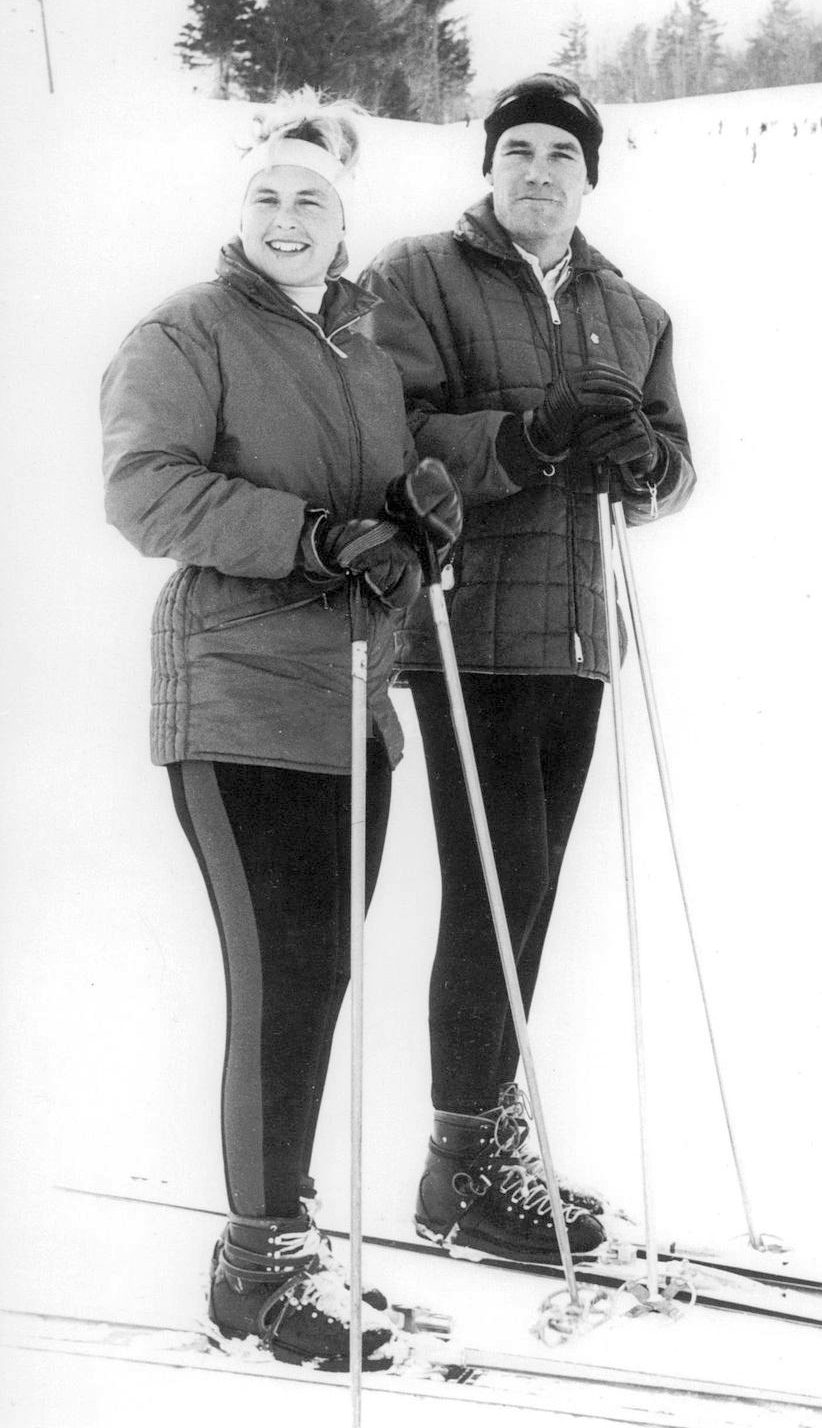
Pitou with politician Barry Goldwater Jr. at her skiing school at the Gunstock Mountain Resort in 1964

Pitou appeared as Miss X but not as the mystery guest on "What's My Line". She continues to be active in the ski community, and runs a skiing school and a travel company through which she leads ski groups to various European resorts. She was seen in December 2007 with New York Senator Hillary Clinton in preparation for the New Hampshire primary for the 2008 American presidential election.
