= Renate Holmes =

British alpine skier (1929–2022)

Personal information
- Full name: Renate Susanne Holmes
- Nationality: British
- Born: 30 August 1929 Bad Homburg vor der Höhe, Germany
- Died: 18 July 2022 Bad Homburg vor der Höhe, Germany

Sport
- Sport: Alpine skiing

Renate Holmes (30 August 1929 – 18 July 2022) was a British alpine skier. She competed at the 1956 Winter Olympics and the 1960 Winter Olympics.

Holmes worked as a secretary at the British Consulate in Frankfurt. She married an RAF officer before moving to Ottawa, Canada.
