= Alpine skiing at the 1960 Winter Olympics =

Alpine skiing at the VIII Olympic Winter Games
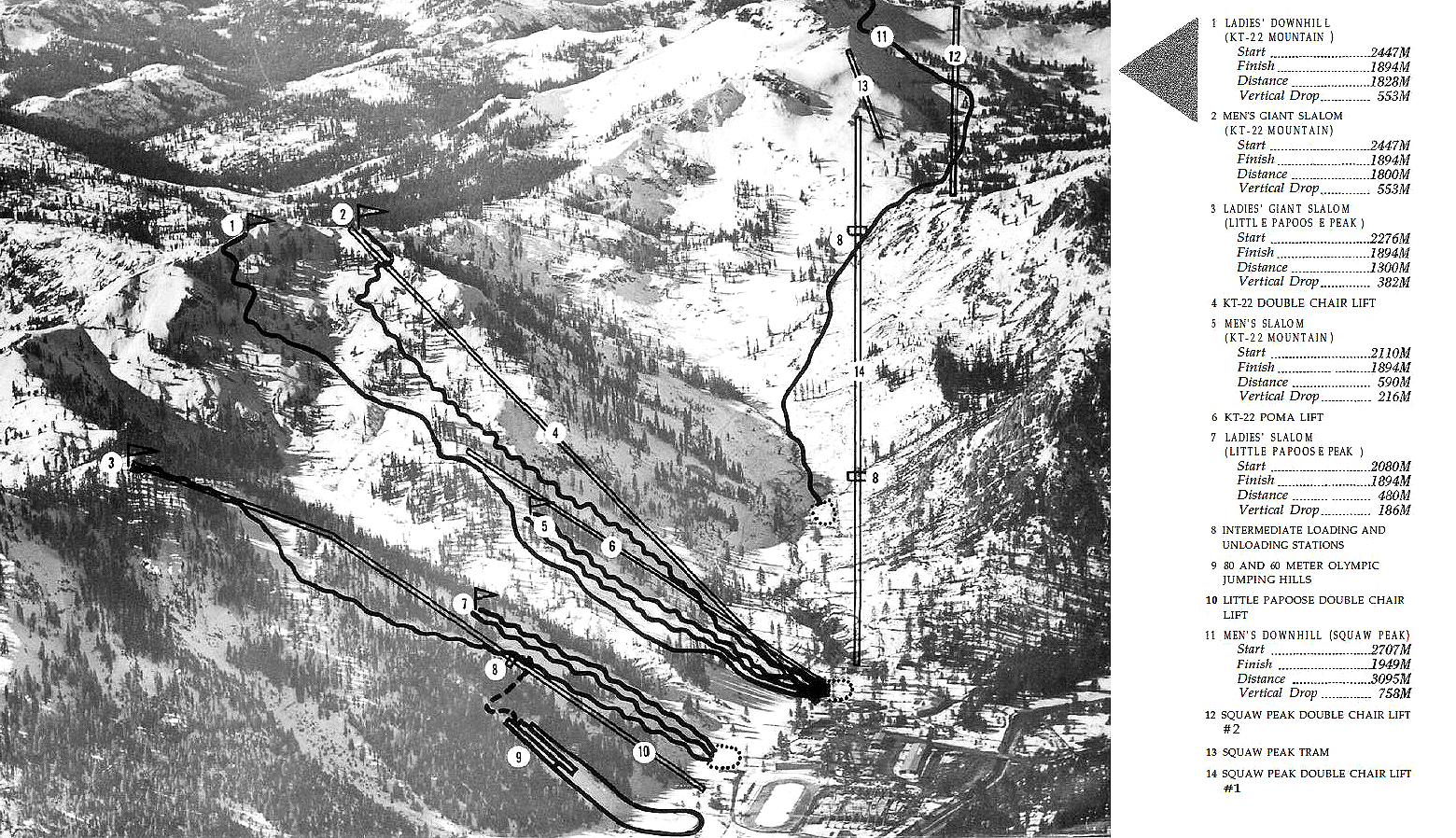
- Olympic runs of 1960
- Venue: Squaw Valley, California, United States
- Dates: February 20–26, 1960
- No. of events: 6
- Competitors: 133 from 22 nations

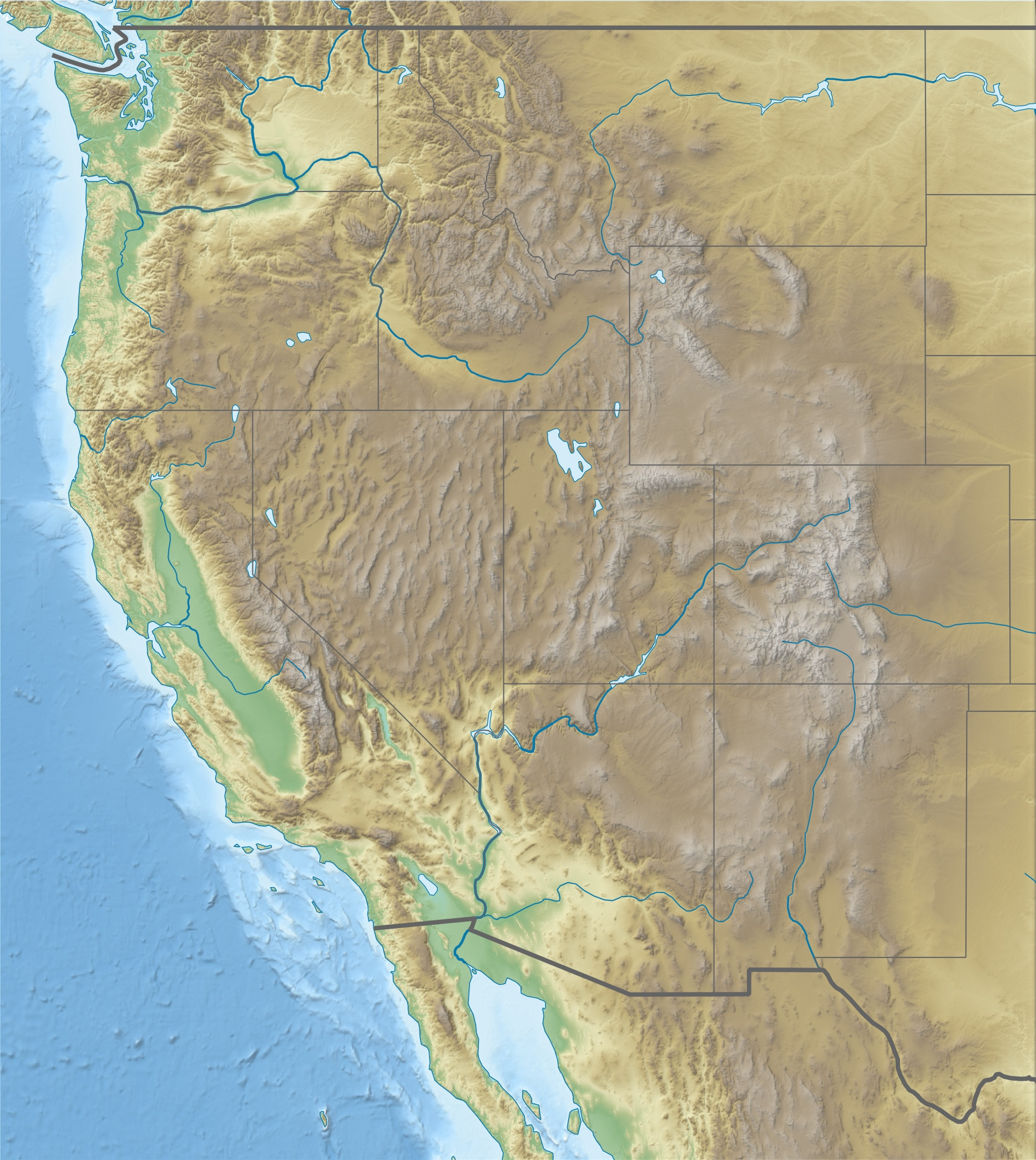
Location in the western United States
Location in California

Alpine skiing at the 1960 Winter Olympics at Squaw Valley, California, United States, consisted of six events. Competitions took place at Squaw Peak (Men's downhill), KT-22 (Women's downhill, Men's slalom and giant slalom), and Papoose Peak (Women's slalom and giant slalom).

The 1960 Winter Games marked the last where race result times were recorded in tenths of a second; at the 1964 Winter Games, the race result times would be recorded in hundredths.

== Medal summary ==
Seven nations won medals in alpine skiing, with Switzerland leading the medal table, winning two golds. Austria won the most total medals with five, one gold, two silver, and two bronze. Austria's Ernst Hinterseer led the individual medal table, with one gold and one bronze. The top women's medalist was the United States' Penny Pitou with two silver medals, having lost giant slalom by a tenth of a second.

=== Medal table ===
Rank	Nation	Gold	Silver	Bronze	Total
1	Switzerland	2	0	0	2
2	Austria	1	2	2	5
3	United Team of Germany	1	1	1	3
4	France	1	0	2	3
5	Canada	1	0	0	1
6	United States	0	3	0	3
7	Italy	0	0	1	1
Totals (7 entries)		6	6	6	18

=== Men's events ===
Event	Gold		Silver		Bronze	
Downhill	Jean Vuarnet; France	2:06.0	Hans-Peter Lanig; United Team of Germany	2:06.5	Guy Périllat; France	2:06.9
Giant slalom	Roger Staub; Switzerland	1:48.3	Josef Stiegler; Austria	1:48.7	Ernst Hinterseer; Austria	1:49.1
Slalom	Ernst Hinterseer; Austria	2:08.9	Hias Leitner; Austria	2:10.3	Charles Bozon; France	2:10.4

=== Women's events ===
Event	Gold		Silver		Bronze	
Downhill	Heidi Biebl; United Team of Germany	1:37.6	Penny Pitou; United States	1:38.6	Traudl Hecher; Austria	1:38.9
Giant slalom	Yvonne Rüegg; Switzerland	1:39.9	Penny Pitou; United States	1:40.0	Giuliana Chenal-Minuzzo; Italy	1:40.2
Slalom	Anne Heggtveit; Canada	1:49.6	Betsy Snite; United States	1:52.9	Barbi Henneberger; United Team of Germany	1:56.6

== Course information ==
Date	Race	Start Elevation	Finish Elevation	Vertical Drop	Course Length	Average Gradient
Mon 22-Feb	Downhill – men	2,707 m (8,881 ft)	1,949 m (6,394 ft)	758 m (2,487 ft)	3.095 km (1.923 mi)	24.5%
Sat 20-Feb	Downhill – women	2,447 m (8,028 ft)	1,894 m (6,214 ft)	553 m (1,814 ft)	1.828 km (1.136 mi)	30.3%
Sun 21-Feb	Giant slalom – men	2,447 m (8,028 ft)	1,894 m (6,214 ft)	553 m (1,814 ft)	1.800 km (1.118 mi)	30.7%
Tue 23-Feb	Giant slalom – women	2,276 m (7,467 ft)	1,894 m (6,214 ft)	382 m (1,253 ft)	1.300 km (0.808 mi)	29.4%
Wed 24-Feb	Slalom – men	2,110 m (6,923 ft)	1,894 m (6,214 ft)	216 m (709 ft)	0.590 km (0.367 mi)	36.6%
Fri 26-Feb	Slalom – women	2,080 m (6,824 ft)	1,894 m (6,214 ft)	186 m (610 ft)	0.480 km (0.298 mi)	38.8%

== Participating nations ==
Twenty-two nations sent alpine skiers to compete in the events in Squaw Valley, and South Korea made its Olympic alpine skiing debut. Below is a list of the competing nations; in parentheses are the number of competitors.

- Argentina (5)
- Australia (3)
- Austria (13)
- Bulgaria (3)
- Canada (9)
- Chile (5)
- France (10)
- United Team of Germany (10)
- Great Britain (8)
- Iceland (3)
- Italy (10)
- Japan (4)
- South Korea (1)
- Lebanon (2)
- Liechtenstein (3)
- New Zealand (4)
- Norway (5)
- Soviet Union (3)
- Spain (4)
- Switzerland (12)
- Turkey (2)
- United States (14)

== World championships ==
From 1948 through 1980, the alpine skiing events at the Winter Olympics also served as the World Championships, held every two years. With the addition of the giant slalom, the combined event was dropped for 1950 and 1952, but returned as a World Championship event in 1954 as a "paper race" which used the results from the three events. During the Olympics from 1956 through 1980, World Championship medals were awarded by the FIS for the combined event. The combined returned as a separate event at the World Championships in 1982 and at the Olympics in 1988.

=== Combined ===
Men's Combined

Medal	Athlete	Points	DH	GS	SL
1st place, gold medalist(s)	(France) Guy Périllat (FRA)	3.98	3rd place, bronze medalist(s)	6	6
2nd place, silver medalist(s)	(France) Charles Bozon (FRA)	5.52	8	9	3rd place, bronze medalist(s)
3rd place, bronze medalist(s)	(West Germany) Hans-Peter Lanig (FRG)	5.66	2nd place, silver medalist(s)	13	7
4	(Austria) Pepi Stiegler (AUT)	6.75	15	2nd place, silver medalist(s)	5
5	(West Germany) Ludwig Leitner (FRG)	8.00	11	18	4
6	(Italy) Paride Milianti (ITA)	8.22	12	8	8

- Downhill: February 22, Giant slalom: February 21, Slalom: February 24

Women's Combined

Medal	Athlete	Points	DH	GS	SL
1st place, gold medalist(s)	(Canada) Anne Heggtveit (CAN)	6.96	12	12	1st place, gold medalist(s)
2nd place, silver medalist(s)	(West Germany) Sonja Sperl (FRG)	10.08	7	9	8
3rd place, bronze medalist(s)	(West Germany) Barbi Henneberger (FRG)	10.80	11	15	3rd place, bronze medalist(s)
4	(West Germany) Anneliese Meggl (FRG)	10.88	6	5	13
5	(France) Thérèse Leduc (FRA)	11.44	14	7	4
6	(Italy) Carla Marchelli (ITA)	11.93	9	5	15

- Downhill: February 20, Giant slalom: February 23, Slalom: February 26
