= Alpine skiing at the 1960 Winter Olympics – Men's downhill =

Men's Downhill at the VIII Olympic Winter Games
- Alpine skiing
- Venue: Squaw Valley
- Date: February 22, 1960
- Competitors: 63 from 21 nations
- Winning time: 2:06.0

Medalists
1st place, gold medalist(s)		Jean Vuarnet	France
2nd place, silver medalist(s)		Hans Peter Lanig	United Team of Germany
3rd place, bronze medalist(s)		Guy Périllat	France

Men's Downhill
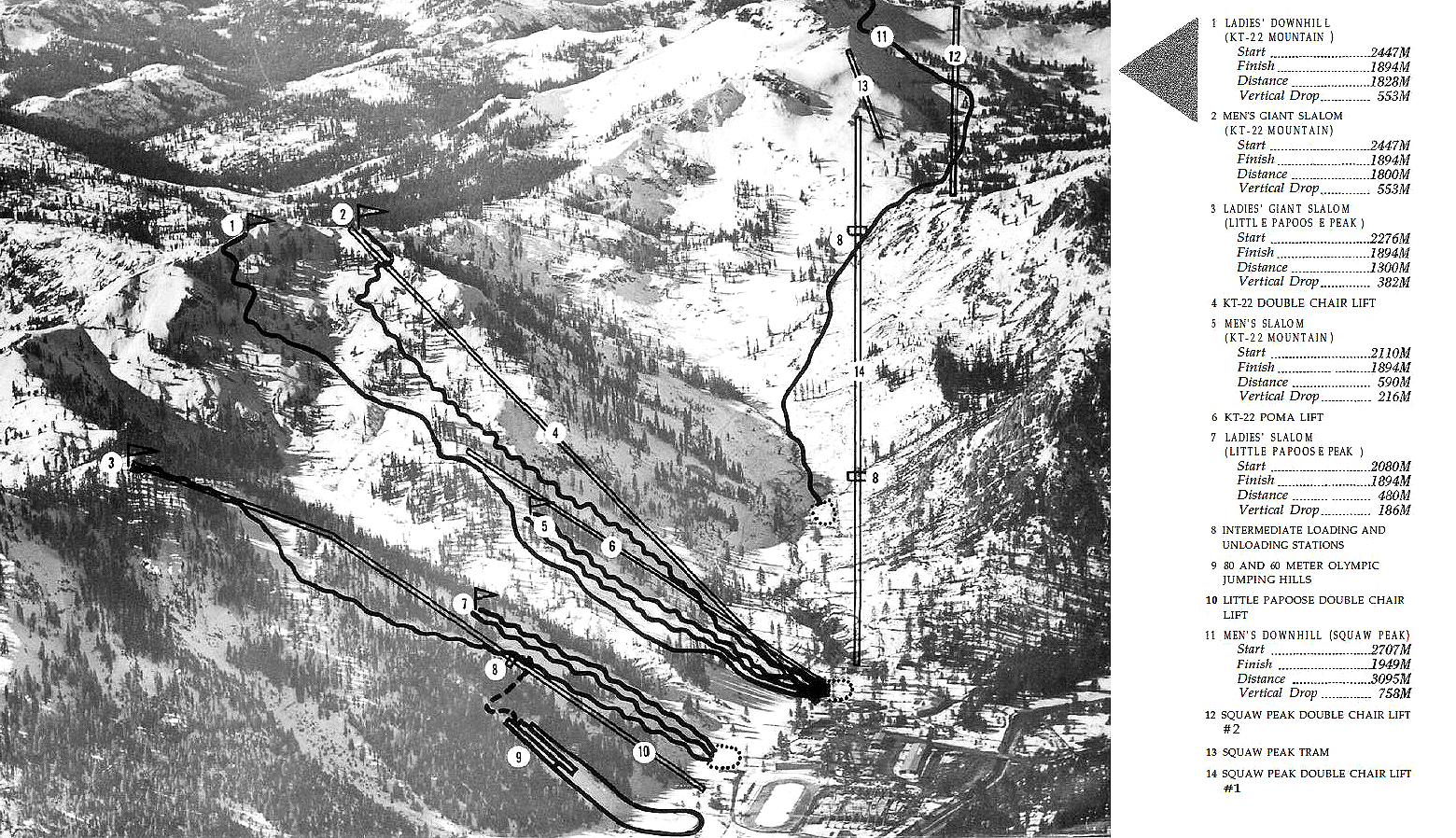
- Location: Squaw Valley; Squaw Peak
- Vertical: 758 m (2,487 ft)
- Top elevation: 2,707 m (8,881 ft)
- Base elevation: 1,949 m (6,394 ft)

The Men's downhill competition of the 1960 Winter Olympics was held at Squaw Valley on Monday, February 22. The race was postponed from February 19, due to heavy snow fall.

Austrian Toni Sailer, the defending Olympic and world champion, did not compete as he had previously retired.

Jean Vuarnet, the bronze medalist at the world championships two years earlier, won by a half-second in the only Olympic event of his career. It was the first time an Olympic race was won on metal skis. Vuarnet's winning time of 126.0 seconds yielded an average speed of 88.429 km/h (54.9 mph), with an average vertical descent rate of 6.016 m/s (19.7 ft/s).

The starting gate was at the top of Squaw Peak at an elevation of 2,707 m (8,881 ft); the course length was 3.095 km (1.923 mi), with a vertical drop of 758 m (2,487 ft).

== Helmets ==
This was the first Olympic downhill in which crash helmets were mandatory, following the race death in 1959 of Canadian John Semmelink at Garmisch, West Germany. During his final race, Semmelink wore a leather helmet, which was more protection than many racers used at the time. The U.S. Ski Team first wore crash helmets at the 1956 Winter Olympics, but most of the Europeans went without.

== Results ==
Monday, February 22, 1960
The race was started at 10:00 local time, (UTC −8).

Rank	Name	Country	Time	Difference
1st place, gold medalist(s)	Jean Vuarnet	France	2:06.0	—
2nd place, silver medalist(s)	Hans Peter Lanig	United Team of Germany	2:06.5	+0.5
3rd place, bronze medalist(s)	Guy Périllat	France	2:06.9	+0.9
4	Willi Forrer	Switzerland	2:07.8	+1.8
5	Roger Staub	Switzerland	2:08.9	+2.9
6	Bruno Alberti	Italy	2:09.1	+3.1
7	Karl Schranz	Austria	2:09.2	+3.2
8	Charles Bozon	France	2:09.6	+3.6
9	Willy Bogner	United Team of Germany	2:09.7	+3.7
10	Egon N. Zimmermann	Austria	2:09.8	+3.8
11	Luggi Leitner	United Team of Germany	2:10.2	+4.2
12	Paride Milianti	Italy	2:10.8	+4.8
13	Jakob Arduser	Switzerland	2:10.9	+4.9
14	Dave Gorsuch	United States	2:11.0	+5.0
15	Pepi Stiegler	Austria	2:13.1	+7.1
16	Eberhard Riedel	United Team of Germany	2:13.3	+7.3
17	Gordi Eaton	United States	2:14.0	+8.0
18	Max Marolt	United States	2:14.2	+8.2
19	Anderl Molterer	Austria	2:15.1	+9.1
20	Nando Pajarola	Switzerland	2:15.4	+9.4
20	Oddvar Rønnestad	Norway	2:15.4	+9.4
22	Marvin Melville	United States	2:15.9	+9.9
22	Verne Anderson	Canada	2:15.9	+9.9
24	Italo Pedroncelli	Italy	2:16.8	+10.8
25	Felice De Nicolo	Italy	2:18.1	+12.1
26	Jean-Guy Brunet	Canada	2:18.2	+12.2
27	Frederick Tommy	Canada	2:18.4	+12.4
28	Don Bruneski	Canada	2:19.9	+13.9
29	Georgi Varoshkin	Bulgaria	2:20.0	+14.0
30	Georgi Dimitrov	Bulgaria	2:20.2	+14.2
31	Francisco Cortes	Chile	2:20.8	+14.8
32	Vicente Vera	Chile	2:24.5	+18.5
33	Jóhann Vilbergsson	Iceland	2:24.6	+18.6
34	Chiharu Igaya	Japan	2:25.0	+19.0
35	Charlach Mackintosh	Great Britain	2:25.1	+19.1
36	Kristinn Benediktsson	Iceland	2:26.0	+20.0
37	Eysteinn Þórðarson	Iceland	2:26.2	+20.2
38	Hernán Boher	Chile	2:26.7	+20.7
39	Victor Tagle	Chile	2:26.9	+20.9
40	Geoff Pitchford	Great Britain	2:27.3	+21.3
41	Adolf Fehr	Liechtenstein	2:27.4	+21.4
42	Manuel García-Moran	Spain	2:27.6	+21.6
43	Robert Skepper	Great Britain	2:28.1	+22.1
44	Luis Sánchez	Spain	2:28.3	+22.3
45	Osvaldo Ancinas	Argentina	2:28.4	+22.4
46	Osamu Tada	Japan	2:28.5	+22.5
47	Aleksandar Shalamanov	Bulgaria	2:29.0	+23.0
48	Sam Chaffey	New Zealand	2:29.3	+23.3
49	Silvan Kindle; Hermann Kindle	Liechtenstein	2:29.4	+23.4
51	Luis Arias	Spain	2:29.8	+23.8
52	Bill Day	Australia	2:30.5	+24.5
53	Masayoshi Mitani	Japan	2:31.3	+25.3
54	Bill Hunt	New Zealand	2:32.0	+26.0
55	John Oakes	Great Britain	2:36.0	+30.0
56	Ibrahim Geagea	Lebanon	2:39.2	+33.2
57	Peter Brockhoff	Australia	2:39.7	+33.7
58	Zeki Şamiloğlu	Turkey	2:42.4	+36.4
59	Nazih Geagea	Lebanon	3:00.3	+54.3
60	Clemente Tellechea	Argentina	3:20.2	+1:14.2
61	Im Gyeong-sun	South Korea	3:34.4	+1:28.4
-	Adrien Duvillard	France	DQ	-
-	Muzaffer Demirhan	Turkey	DQ	-
