= Alpine skiing at the 1960 Winter Olympics – Men's slalom =

Men's slalom at the VIII Olympic Winter Games
- Alpine skiing
- Venue: Squaw Valley
- Date: February 24, 1960
- Competitors: 63 from 21 nations
- Winning time: 3:09.62

Medalists
| 1st place, gold medalist(s) | | Ernst Hinterseer | Austria |
| 2nd place, silver medalist(s) | | Hias Leitner | Austria |
| 3rd place, bronze medalist(s) | | Charles Bozon | France |

The Men's slalom competition of the Squaw Valley 1960 Olympics was held on February 24 at Squaw Valley.

The defending world champion was Josl Rieder of Austria.

During the event, race officials asked CBS if they could review videotape of the race because of a controversy about one skier who was alleged to have missed a gate. This gave CBS producers the idea to invent instant replay.

== Results ==
| Rank | Name | Country | Run 1 | Run 2 | Total | Difference |
|---|---|---|---|---|---|---|
| 1st place, gold medalist(s) | Ernst Hinterseer | Austria | 1:10.7 | 0:58.2 | 2:08.9 | - |
| 2nd place, silver medalist(s) | Hias Leitner | Austria | 1:11.1 | 0:59.2 | 2:10.3 | +1.4 |
| 3rd place, bronze medalist(s) | Charles Bozon | France | 1:09.8 | 1:00.6 | 2:10.4 | +1.5 |
| 4 | Luggi Leitner | United Team of Germany | 1:10.9 | 0:59.6 | 2:10.5 | +1.6 |
| 5 | Pepi Stiegler | Austria | 1:11.5 | 0:59.6 | 2:11.1 | +2.2 |
| 6 | Guy Périllat | France | 1:11.0 | 1:00.8 | 2:11.8 | +2.9 |
| 7 | Hans Peter Lanig | United Team of Germany | 1:11.9 | 1:02.4 | 2:14.3 | +5.4 |
| 8 | Paride Milianti | Italy | 1:10.1 | 1:04.3 | 2:14.4 | +5.5 |
| 9 | Tom Corcoran | United States | 1:12.5 | 1:02.2 | 2:14.7 | +5.8 |
| 10 | Sepp Behr | United Team of Germany | 1:12.1 | 1:03.9 | 2:16.0 | +7.1 |
| 11 | Italo Pedroncelli | Italy | 1:17.2 | 1:02.5 | 2:19.7 | +10.8 |
| 12 | Chiharu Igaya | Japan | 1:10.9 | 1:09.3 | 2:20.2 | +11.3 |
| 13 | Carlo Senoner | Italy | 1:18.9 | 1:01.8 | 2:20.7 | +11.8 |
| 14 | Oddvar Rønnestad | Norway | 1:18.8 | 1:04.5 | 2:23.3 | +14.4 |
| 15 | Adolf Mathis | Switzerland | 1:13.9 | 1:09.6 | 2:23.5 | +14.6 |
| 16 | Osvaldo Ancinas | Argentina | 1:17.5 | 1:06.7 | 2:24.2 | +15.3 |
| 17 | Eysteinn Þórðarson | Iceland | 1:17.0 | 1:07.9 | 2:24.9 | +16.0 |
| 18 | Georgi Dimitrov | Bulgaria | 1:16.9 | 1:08.2 | 2:25.1 | +16.2 |
| 19 | Verne Anderson | Canada | 1:17.0 | 1:12.3 | 2:29.3 | +20.4 |
| 20 | Bruno Alberti | Italy | 1:28.5 | 1:02.1 | 2:30.6 | +21.7 |
| 21 | Silvan Kindle | Liechtenstein | 1:19.3 | 1:11.4 | 2:30.7 | +21.8 |
| 22 | Don Bruneski | Canada | 1:19.8 | 1:13.1 | 2:32.9 | +24.0 |
| 23 | Kristinn Benediktsson | Iceland | 1:24.1 | 1:13.0 | 2:37.1 | +28.2 |
| 24 | Luis Arias | Spain | 1:24.3 | 1:16.2 | 2:40.5 | +31.6 |
| 25 | Frederick Tommy | Canada | 1:18.4 | 1:25.5 | 2:43.9 | +35.0 |
| 26 | Osamu Tada | Japan | 1:17.2 | 1:26.8 | 2:44.0 | +35.1 |
| 27 | Hermann Kindle | Liechtenstein | 1:28.7 | 1:17.0 | 2:45.7 | +36.8 |
| 28 | Hernán Boher | Chile | 1:24.2 | 1:22.9 | 2:47.1 | +38.2 |
| 29 | Georgi Varoshkin | Bulgaria | 1:21.3 | 1:26.2 | 2:47.5 | +38.6 |
| 30 | Peter Brockhoff | Australia | 1:27.3 | 1:24.4 | 2:51.7 | +42.8 |
| 31 | Georges Schneider | Switzerland | 1:13.0 | 1:39.7 | 2:52.7 | +43.8 |
| 32 | Clemente Tellechea | Argentina | 1:28.7 | 1:26.0 | 2:54.7 | +45.8 |
| 33 | Takashi Takeda | Japan | 1:26.7 | 1:29.3 | 2:56.0 | +47.1 |
| 34 | Jean-Guy Brunet | Canada | 1:26.1 | 1:31.9 | 2:58.0 | +49.1 |
| 34 | Manuel García-Moran | Spain | 1:32.3 | 1:25.7 | 2:58.0 | +49.1 |
| 36 | Robert Skepper | Great Britain | 1:41.6 | 1:18.5 | 3:00.1 | +51.2 |
| 37 | Frank Brown | United States | 1:58.2 | 1:03.1 | 3:01.3 | +52.4 |
| 38 | Diego Schweizer | Argentina | 1:32.2 | 1:34.6 | 3:06.8 | +57.9 |
| 39 | Zeki Şamiloğlu | Turkey | 1:29.0 | 2:05.7 | 3:34.7 | +1:25.8 |
| 40 | Im Gyeong-Sun | South Korea | 2:20.9 | 2:35.2 | 4:56.1 | +2:47.2 |
| - | Francisco Cortes | Chile | ? | DQ | - | - |
| - | Jorge Abelardo Eiras | Argentina | ? | DQ | - | - |
| - | Jim Barrier | United States | ? | DNF | - | - |
| - | Willy Bogner | United Team of Germany | 1:08.8 | DQ | - | - |
| - | François Bonlieu | France | 1:09.8 | DQ | - | - |
| - | Chuck Ferries | United States | 1:16.1 | DQ | - | - |
| - | Willi Forrer | Switzerland | 1:16.1 | DQ | - | - |
| - | Vicente Vera | Chile | 1:20.4 | DQ | - | - |
| - | Adrien Duvillard | France | 1:21.9 | DQ | - | - |
| - | Bill Day | Australia | 1:22.1 | DQ | - | - |
| - | Nazih Geagea | Lebanon | 1:22.4 | DQ | - | - |
| - | Geoff Pitchford | Great Britain | 1:23.5 | DQ | - | - |
| - | Masayoshi Mitani | Japan | 1:23.8 | DQ | - | - |
| - | Jóhann Vilbergsson | Iceland | 1:25.7 | DQ | - | - |
| - | Muzaffer Demirhan | Turkey | 1:26.3 | DQ | - | - |
| - | Luis Sánchez | Spain | 1:52.1 | DQ | - | - |
| - | Roger Staub | Switzerland | DQ | - | - | - |
| - | Ernst Oberaigner | Austria | DQ | - | - | - |
| - | Aleksandar Shalamanov | Bulgaria | DQ | - | - | - |
| - | Sam Chaffey | New Zealand | DQ | - | - | - |
| - | Bill Hunt | New Zealand | DQ | - | - | - |
| - | Adolf Fehr | Liechtenstein | DQ | - | - | - |
| - | Victor Tagle | Chile | DQ | - | - | - |
