= Alpine skiing at the 1960 Winter Olympics – Men's giant slalom =

Men's giant slalom at the VIII Olympic Winter Games
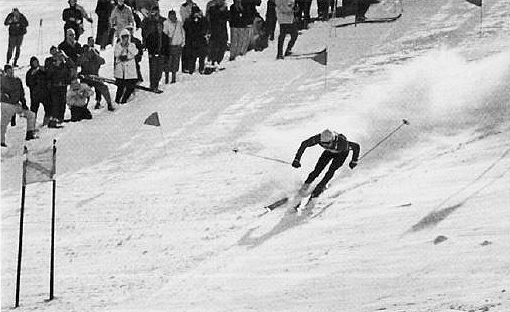
- Gold medalist Roger Staub
- Venue: Squaw Valley
- Date: February 21, 1960
- Competitors: 65 from 21 nations
- Winning time: 1:48.3

Medalists
1st place, gold medalist(s)		Roger Staub	Switzerland
2nd place, silver medalist(s)		Pepi Stiegler	Austria
3rd place, bronze medalist(s)		Ernst Hinterseer	Austria

The Men's giant slalom competition of the Squaw Valley 1960 Olympics was held on February 21 at Squaw Valley.

The defending world champion was Toni Sailer of Austria.

== Results ==
Rank	Name	Country	Time	Difference
1st place, gold medalist(s)	Roger Staub	Switzerland	1:48.3	—
2nd place, silver medalist(s)	Pepi Stiegler	Austria	1:48.7	+0.4
3rd place, bronze medalist(s)	Ernst Hinterseer	Austria	1:49.1	+0.8
4	Tom Corcoran	United States	1:49.7	+1.4
5	Bruno Alberti	Italy	1:50.1	+1.8
6	Guy Périllat	France	1:50.7	+2.4
7	Karl Schranz	Austria	1:50.8	+2.5
8	Paride Milianti	Italy	1:50.9	+2.6
9	Charles Bozon	France	1:51.0	+2.7
10	Adrien Duvillard	France	1:51.1	+2.8
11	François Bonlieu	France	1:51.2	+2.9
12	Anderl Molterer	Austria	1:51.6	+3.3
13	Hans Peter Lanig	United Team of Germany	1:51.9	+3.6
14	Dave Gorsuch	United States	1:52.3	+4.0
15	Fritz Wagnerberger	United Team of Germany	1:52.5	+4.2
16	Jim Barrier	United States	1:52.7	+4.4
17	Carlo Senoner	Italy	1:53.1	+4.8
18	Luggi Leitner	United Team of Germany	1:53.6	+5.3
19	Italo Pedroncelli	Italy	1:53.8	+5.5
20	Willi Forrer	Switzerland	1:53.9	+5.6
21	Max Marolt	United States	1:54.9	+6.6
22	Fredy Brupbacher	Switzerland	1:55.0	+6.7
23	Chiharu Igaya	Japan	1:55.8	+7.5
24	Verne Anderson	Canada	1:56.1	+7.8
25	Nando Pajarola	Switzerland	1:56.2	+7.9
26	Jean-Guy Brunet	Canada	1:57.7	+9.4
27	Eysteinn Þórðarson	Iceland	1:59.1	+10.8
28	Frederick Tommy	Canada	2:00.1	+11.8
29	Georgi Varoshkin	Bulgaria	2:01.0	+12.7
30	Georgi Dimitrov	Bulgaria	2:02.9	+14.6
31	Jean Lessard	Canada	2:04.7	+16.4
32	Osvaldo Ancinas	Argentina	2:05.1	+16.8
33	Masayoshi Mitani	Japan	2:05.6	+17.3
34	Kristinn Benediktsson	Iceland	2:06.1	+17.8
35	Osamu Tada	Japan	2:06.5	+18.2
36	Mario Vera	Chile	2:06.8	+18.5
37	Aleksandar Shalamanov	Bulgaria	2:07.0	+18.7
38	Vicente Vera	Chile	2:07.7	+19.4
39	Silvan Kindle	Liechtenstein	2:08.9	+20.6
40	Hermann Kindle	Liechtenstein	2:11.7	+23.4
41	Bill Day	Australia	2:12.2	+23.9
42	Luis Arias	Spain	2:13.2	+24.9
43	Adolf Fehr	Liechtenstein	2:13.3	+25.0
44	Takashi Takeda	Japan	2:13.4	+25.1
45	Luis Sánchez	Spain	2:13.6	+25.3
46	Francisco Cortes	Chile	2:14.3	+26.0
47	Manuel García-Moran	Spain	2:14.8	+26.5
48	John Oakes	Great Britain	2:16.3	+28.0
49	Nazih Geagea	Lebanon	2:20.3	+32.0
50	Geoff Pitchford	Great Britain	2:20.4	+32.1
51	Oddvar Rønnestad	Norway	2:23.3	+35.0
51	Bill Hunt	New Zealand	2:23.3	+35.0
53	Robert Skepper	Great Britain	2:26.2	+37.9
54	Zeki Şamiloğlu	Turkey	2:26.3	+38.0
55	Diego Schweizer	Argentina	2:28.0	+39.7
56	Hernán Boher	Chile	2:28.5	+40.2
57	Ibrahim Geagea	Lebanon	2:29.1	+40.8
58	Sam Chaffey	New Zealand	2:32.3	+44.0
-	Willy Bogner	United Team of Germany	DQ	-
-	Peter Brockhoff	Australia	DQ	-
-	Muzaffer Demirhan	Turkey	DQ	-
-	Jóhann Vilbergsson	Iceland	DQ	-
-	Charlach Mackintosh	Great Britain	DQ	-
-	Im Gyeong-Sun	South Korea	DQ	-
-	Clemente Tellechea	Argentina	DQ	-
