= Switzerland at the 1960 Winter Olympics =

- IOC code: SUI (SWI used at these Games)
- NOC: Swiss Olympic Association
- Website: www.swissolympic.ch (in German and French)

in Squaw Valley
- Competitors: 21 (14 men, 7 women) in 4 sports
- Flag bearer: Andreas Däscher
- Medals Ranked 8th: Gold 2 Silver 0 Bronze 0 Total 2

Winter Olympics appearances (overview)
- 1924; 1928; 1932; 1936; 1948; 1952; 1956; 1960; 1964; 1968; 1972; 1976; 1980; 1984; 1988; 1992; 1994; 1998; 2002; 2006; 2010; 2014; 2018; 2022; 2026

Switzerland competed at the 1960 Winter Olympics in Squaw Valley, United States.

== Medalists ==
| Medal | Name | Sport | Event | Date |
|---|---|---|---|---|
| Gold | Roger Staub | Alpine skiing | Men's giant slalom | February 21 |
| Gold | Yvonne Rüegg | Alpine skiing | Women's giant slalom | February 23 |

== Alpine skiing ==
Men

| Athlete | Event | Race 1 | | Race 2 | | Total | |
| Athlete | Event | Time | Rank | Time | Rank | Time | Rank |
|---|---|---|---|---|---|---|---|
| Nando Pajarola | Downhill | | | | | 2:15.4 | 20 |
| Jakob Arduser | Downhill | | | | | 2:10.9 | 13 |
| Roger Staub | Downhill | | | | | 2:08.9 | 5 |
| Willi Forrer | Downhill | | | | | 2:07.8 | 4 |
| Nando Pajarola | Giant Slalom | | | | | 1:56.2 | 25 |
| Fredy Brupbacher | Giant Slalom | | | | | 1:55.0 | 22 |
| Willi Forrer | Giant Slalom | | | | | 1:53.9 | 20 |
| Roger Staub | Giant Slalom | | | | | 1:48.3 | 1st place, gold medalist(s) |
| Roger Staub | Slalom | DSQ | – | – | – | DSQ | – |
| Willi Forrer | Slalom | 1:16.1 | 16 | DSQ | – | DSQ | – |
| Adolf Mathis | Slalom | 1:13.9 | 15 | 1:09.6 | 20 | 2:23.5 | 15 |
| Georges Schneider | Slalom | 1:13.0 | 14 | 1:39.7 | 38 | 2:52.7 | 31 |

Women

| Athlete | Event | Race 1 | | Race 2 | | Total | |
| Athlete | Event | Time | Rank | Time | Rank | Time | Rank |
|---|---|---|---|---|---|---|---|
| Annemarie Waser | Downhill | | | | | DSQ | – |
| Liselotte Michel | Downhill | | | | | 2:01.0 | 35 |
| Margrit Gertsch | Downhill | | | | | 1:50.4 | 26 |
| Yvonne Rüegg | Downhill | | | | | 1:41.6 | 9 |
| Annemarie Waser | Giant Slalom | | | | | 1:46.0 | 23 |
| Liselotte Michel | Giant Slalom | | | | | 1:42.5 | 14 |
| Madeleine Berthod-Chamot | Giant Slalom | | | | | 1:41.9 | 9 |
| Yvonne Rüegg | Giant Slalom | | | | | 1:39.9 | 1st place, gold medalist(s) |
| Yvonne Rüegg | Slalom | DSQ | – | – | – | DSQ | – |
| Madeleine Berthod-Chamot | Slalom | 1:12.1 | 37 | 1:03.3 | 22 | 2:15.4 | 28 |
| Liselotte Michel | Slalom | 58.8 | 13 | 59.2 | 6 | 1:58.0 | 5 |
| Annemarie Waser | Slalom | 57.6 | 7 | DSQ | – | DSQ | – |

== Cross-country skiing ==
Men

| Event | Athlete | Race | |
| Event | Athlete | Time | Rank |
|---|---|---|---|
| 15 km | Konrad Hischier | 57:43.9 | 39 |
| 15 km | Marcel Huguenin | 57:36.7 | 37 |
| 15 km | Lorenz Possa | 56:30.1 | 31 |
| 15 km | Alphonse Baume | 55:58.9 | 27 |
| 30 km | Fritz Kocher | DNF | – |
| 30 km | Lorenz Possa | 2'05:41.2 | 32 |
| 30 km | Marcel Huguenin | 2'03:25.6 | 28 |
| 30 km | Alphonse Baume | 2'02:04.2 | 24 |
| 50 km | Fritz Kocher | DNF | – |

Men's 4 × 10 km relay

| Athletes | Race | |
| Athletes | Time | Rank |
|---|---|---|
| Fritz Kocher; Marcel Huguenin; Lorenz Possa; Alphonse Baume | 2'29:36.8 | 8 |

== Figure skating ==
Women

| Athlete | CF | FS | Points | Places | Rank |
|---|---|---|---|---|---|
| Franziska Schmidt | 21 | 19 | 1141.8 | 184 | 22 |
| Liliane Crosa | 22 | 17 | 1157.4 | 171 | 20 |

== Ski jumping ==
| Athlete | Event | Jump 1 | | | Jump 2 | | | Total | |
| Athlete | Event | Distance | Points | Rank | Distance | Points | Rank | Points | Rank |
|---|---|---|---|---|---|---|---|---|---|
| Andreas Däscher | Normal hill | 86.0 | 101.1 | 18 | 77.0 | 100.1 | 24 | 201.2 | 20 |
