= Canada at the 1960 Winter Olympics =

- IOC code: CAN
- NOC: Canadian Olympic Committee
- Website: www.olympic.ca (in English and French)

in Squaw Valley
- Competitors: 44 (34 men, 10 women) in 7 sports
- Flag bearer: Bob Paul
- Medals Ranked 7th: Gold 2 Silver 1 Bronze 1 Total 4

Winter Olympics appearances (overview)
- 1924; 1928; 1932; 1936; 1948; 1952; 1956; 1960; 1964; 1968; 1972; 1976; 1980; 1984; 1988; 1992; 1994; 1998; 2002; 2006; 2010; 2014; 2018; 2022; 2026

Canada competed at the 1960 Winter Olympics in Squaw Valley, United States. Canada has competed at every Winter Olympic Games.

== Medalists ==
| Medal | Name | Sport | Event |
|---|---|---|---|
| Gold | Anne Heggtveit | Alpine skiing | Women's slalom |
| Gold | Barbara Wagner; Robert Paul | Figure skating | Pairs |
| Silver | Canada men's national ice hockey team (Kitchener-Waterloo Dutchmen): Bob Attersley; Maurice Benoît; James Connelly; Jack Douglas; Fred Etcher; Robert Forhan; Don Head; Harold Hurley; Ken Laufman; Floyd Martin; Robert McKnight; Cliff Pennington; Donald Rope; Bobby Rousseau; George Samolenko; Harry Sinden; Darryl Sly | Ice hockey | Men's competition |
| Bronze | Donald Jackson | Figure skating | Men's singles |

== Alpine skiing ==
Men

| Athlete | Event | Race 1 | | Race 2 | | Total | |
| Athlete | Event | Time | Rank | Time | Rank | Time | Rank |
|---|---|---|---|---|---|---|---|
| Donald Bruneski | Downhill | | | | | 2:19.9 | 28 |
| Frederick Tommy | Downhill | | | | | 2:18.4 | 27 |
| Jean-Guy Brunet | Downhill | | | | | 2:18.2 | 26 |
| Verne Anderson | Downhill | | | | | 2:15.9 | 22 |
| Jean Lessard | Giant Slalom | | | | | 2:04.7 | 31 |
| Frederick Tommy | Giant Slalom | | | | | 2:00.1 | 28 |
| Jean-Guy Brunet | Giant Slalom | | | | | 1:57.7 | 26 |
| Verne Anderson | Giant Slalom | | | | | 1:56.1 | 24 |
| Jean-Guy Brunet | Slalom | 1:26.1 | 40 | 1:31.9 | 36 | 2:58.0 | 34 |
| Donald Bruneski | Slalom | 1:19.8 | 28 | 1:13.1 | 24 | 2:32.9 | 22 |
| Frederick Tommy | Slalom | 1:18.4 | 24 | 1:25.5 | 30 | 2:43.9 | 25 |
| Verne Anderson | Slalom | 1:17.0 | 19 | 1:12.3 | 22 | 2:29.3 | 19 |

Women

| Athlete | Event | Race 1 | | Race 2 | | Total | |
| Athlete | Event | Time | Rank | Time | Rank | Time | Rank |
|---|---|---|---|---|---|---|---|
| Elizabeth Greene | Downhill | | | | | 1:53.3 | 32 |
| Nancy Greene | Downhill | | | | | 1:48.3 | 22 |
| Nancy Holland | Downhill | | | | | 1:45.2 | 17 |
| Anne Heggtveit | Downhill | | | | | 1:42.9 | 12 |
| Nancy Holland | Giant Slalom | | | | | 1:48.7 | 29 |
| Elizabeth Greene | Giant Slalom | | | | | 1:48.4 | 28 |
| Nancy Greene | Giant Slalom | | | | | 1:47.4 | 26 |
| Anne Heggtveit | Giant Slalom | | | | | 1:42.1 | 12 |
| Nancy Greene | Slalom | 1:09.4 | 36 | 1:08.6 | 30 | 2:18.0 | 31 |
| Elizabeth Greene | Slalom | 1:06.0 | 32 | 1:04.4 | 25 | 2:10.4 | 24 |
| Nancy Holland | Slalom | 1:01.6 | 22 | 59.5 | 9 | 2:01.1 | 12 |
| Anne Heggtveit | Slalom | 54.0 | 1 | 55.6 | 2 | 1:49.6 | 1st place, gold medalist(s) |

== Cross-country skiing ==
Men

| Event | Athlete | Race | |
| Event | Athlete | Time | Rank |
|---|---|---|---|
| 15 km | Irvin Servold | 59:42.0 | 47 |
| 15 km | Clarence Servold | 57:04.7 | 35 |
| 30 km | Irvin Servold | 2'11:50.4 | 40 |
| 30 km | Clarence Servold | 2'06:37.9 | 36 |
| 50 km | Clarence Servold | DNF | – |

== Figure skating ==
Men

| Athlete | CF | FS | Points | Places | Rank |
|---|---|---|---|---|---|
| Donald McPherson | 13 | 7 | 1279.7 | 83 | 10 |
| Donald Jackson | 4 | 2 | 1401.0 | 31 | 3rd place, bronze medalist(s) |

Women

| Athlete | CF | FS | Points | Places | Rank |
|---|---|---|---|---|---|
| Wendy Griner | 13 | 8 | 1275.0 | 98 | 12 |
| Sandra Tewkesbury | 10 | 9 | 1296.1 | 78 | 10 |

Pairs

| Athletes | Points | Places | Rank |
|---|---|---|---|
| Maria Jelinek; Otto Jelinek | 75.9 | 26 | 4 |
| Barbara Wagner; Robert Paul | 80.4 | 7 | 1st place, gold medalist(s) |

== Ice hockey ==
Canada was represented by the Kitchener-Waterloo Dutchmen, which also represented Canada at the 1956 Winter Olympics (bronze medal). The Dutchmen are the only self-contained club team to represent Canada at two different Olympics.

=== Group A ===
Top two teams (shaded ones) from each group advanced to the final round and played for 1st-6th places, other teams played in the consolation round.

| Rank | Team | Pld | W | L | T | GF | GA | Pts |
|---|---|---|---|---|---|---|---|---|
| 1 | Canada | 2 | 2 | 0 | 0 | 24 | 3 | 4 |
| 2 | Sweden | 2 | 1 | 1 | 0 | 21 | 5 | 2 |
| 3 | Japan | 2 | 0 | 2 | 0 | 1 | 38 | 0 |

- Canada 5-2 Sweden
- Canada 19-1 Japan

=== Final round ===
| Rank | Team | Pld | W | L | T | GF | GA | Pts |
|---|---|---|---|---|---|---|---|---|
| 1 | United States | 5 | 5 | 0 | 0 | 29 | 11 | 10 |
| 2 | Canada (silver) | 5 | 4 | 1 | 0 | 31 | 12 | 8 |
| 3 | Soviet Union | 5 | 2 | 2 | 1 | 24 | 19 | 5 |
| 4 | Czechoslovakia | 5 | 2 | 3 | 0 | 21 | 23 | 4 |
| 5 | Sweden | 5 | 1 | 3 | 1 | 19 | 19 | 3 |
| 6 | Germany | 5 | 0 | 5 | 0 | 5 | 45 | 0 |

- Canada 12-0 Germany (UTG)
- Canada 4-0 Czechoslovakia
- USA 2-1 Canada
- Canada 6-5 Sweden
- Canada 8-5 USSR

=== Leading scorers ===
| Rk | Team | GP | G | A | Pts |
|---|---|---|---|---|---|
| 1st | (Canada) Fred Etcher | 7 | 9 | 12 | 21 |
| 2nd | (Canada) Bob Attersley | 7 | 6 | 12 | 18 |
| 5th | (Canada) George Samolenko | 7 | 8 | 4 | 12 |
| 11th | (Canada) Floyd Martin | 7 | 6 | 6 | 12 |

Silver:
Bob Attersley
Maurice Benoît
James Connelly
Jack Douglas
Fred Etcher
Robert Forhan
Don Head
Harold Hurley
Ken Laufman
Floyd Martin
Robert McKnight
Cliff Pennington
Donald Rope
Bobby Rousseau
George Samolenko
Harry Sinden
Darryl Sly

== Nordic combined ==
Events:

- normal hill ski jumping (Three jumps, best two counted and shown here.)
- 15 km cross-country skiing

| Athlete | Event | Ski Jumping | | | | Cross-country | | | Total | |
| Athlete | Event | Distance 1 | Distance 2 | Points | Rank | Time | Points | Rank | Points | Rank |
|---|---|---|---|---|---|---|---|---|---|---|
| Clarence Servold | Individual | 42.5 | 47.0 | 144.0 | 32 | 58:49.1 | 238.710 | 2 | 382.710 | 28 |
| Irvin Servold | Individual | 48.0 | 56.5 | 177.5 | 29 | 1'03:07.3 | 222.065 | 18 | 399.565 | 25 |

== Ski jumping ==
| Athlete | Event | Jump 1 | | | Jump 2 | | | Total | |
| Athlete | Event | Distance | Points | Rank | Distance | Points | Rank | Points | Rank |
|---|---|---|---|---|---|---|---|---|---|
| Alois Moser | Normal hill | 62.0 | 71.4 | 45 | 64.0 | 79.7 | 43 | 151.1 | 44 |
| Jacques Charland | Normal hill | 76.5 | 91.0 | 35 | 73.5 | 95.3 | 35 | 186.3 | 33 |
| Gerry Gravelle | Normal hill | 79.5 | 94.4 | 30 | 70.0 | 91.0 | 39 | 185.4 | 34 |

== Speed skating ==
Men

| Event | Athlete | Race | |
| Event | Athlete | Time | Rank |
|---|---|---|---|
| 500 m | Larry Mason | 44.7 | 41 |
| 500 m | Ralf Olin | 43.1 | 30 |
| 500 m | Johnny Sands | 42.8 | 27 |
| 1500 m | Larry Mason | 2:35.3 | 45 |
| 1500 m | Johnny Sands | 2:28.4 | 43 |
| 1500 m | Ralf Olin | 2:23.5 | 36 |
| 5000 m | Larry Mason | 9:23.5 | 37 |
| 5000 m | Ralf Olin | 8:36.8 | 28 |
| 10,000 m | Ralf Olin | 17:50.9 | 27 |

Women

| Event | Athlete | Race | |
| Event | Athlete | Time | Rank |
|---|---|---|---|
| 500 m | Margaret Robb | 50.0 | 17 |
| 500 m | Doreen Ryan | 47.7 | 9 |
| 1000 m | Margaret Robb | 1:45.8 | 19 |
| 1000 m | Doreen Ryan | 1:38.1 | 13 |
| 1500 m | Margaret Robb | 2:48.6 | 20 |
| 1500 m | Doreen Ryan | 2:34.5 | 13 |
| 3000 m | Margaret Robb | 5:43.5 | 16 |
| 3000 m | Doreen Ryan | 5:39.7 | 14 |

== Official outfitter ==
HBC was the official outfitter of clothing for members of the Canadian Olympic team.
