= Servold =

Servold is a surname. Notable people with the surname include:

- Clarence Servold (1927–2019), Canadian skier
- Irvin Servold (born 1932), Canadian skier
- Jon Servold (born 1960), Canadian skier
