= KNKL =

KNKL may refer to:

- KNKL (FM), a radio station (88.1 FM) licensed to serve Tremonton, Utah, United States
- KUAO (FM), a radio station (88.7 FM) licensed to serve North Ogden, Utah, which held the call sign KNKL from 2002 to 2019
