= KUAO =

KUAO may refer to:

- KUAO (FM), a radio station (88.7 FM) licensed to serve North Ogden, Utah, United States
- KNKL (FM), a radio station (88.1 FM) licensed to serve Tremonton, Utah, which held the call sign KUAO from 2017 to 2019
- Aurora State Airport (ICAO code KUAO)
