= Brupbacher =

Brupbacher is a surname. Notable people with the surname include:

- Fredy Brupbacher (1934–2018), Swiss alpine skier
- Fritz Brupbacher (1874–1945), Swiss doctor and writer
- Joëlle Brupbacher (1978–2011), Swiss mountaineer
- Ross Brupbacher (born 1948), American football player
