= Adolf Fehr =

Adolf Fehr may refer to:

- Adolf Fehr (field hockey) (1904–1992), Swiss field hockey player
- Adolf Fehr (alpine skier) (1940–2022), Liechtenstein alpine skier
