= 1957 NCAA skiing championships =

American college skiing competition

Coordinates: 41.216°N 111.857°W

1957 NCAA Skiing Championships

Tournament information
- Sport: College skiing
- Location: Mount Ogden, Weber County, Utah
- Dates: March 29–31, 1957
- Administrator: NCAA
- Host(s): Utah, Utah State
- Venue: Snow Basin
- Teams: 8
- Number of events: 4 (7 titles)

Final positions
- Champions: Denver (4th title)
- 1st runners-up: Colorado
- 2nd runners-up: Dartmouth

Location in the United States

The 1957 NCAA Skiing Championships were contested at Snow Basin at Mount Ogden, Utah, at the fourth annual NCAA-sanctioned ski tournament to determine the individual and team national champions of men's collegiate alpine skiing, cross-country skiing, and ski jumping in the United States.

Denver claimed its fourth national championship in as many years, all under coach Willy Schaeffler, topping in-state rivals Colorado in the team standings.

The sole repeat individual champion was Dartmouth's Chiharu Igaya in the slalom, his third consecutive and sixth individual NCAA title. He was the silver medalist in slalom at the 1956 Winter Olympics.

== Venue ==
These championships were held March 29–31 in Utah at Snow Basin, located on Mount Ogden in Weber County, north of Salt Lake City.

The fourth edition, these were the first NCAA championships in Utah and the Wasatch Range. Later contracted to "Snowbasin", the ski area hosted the alpine speed events of the 2002 Winter Olympics.

== Team scoring ==
Rank	Team	Points
1st place, gold medalist(s)	Denver	577.95
2nd place, silver medalist(s)	Colorado	545.29
3rd place, bronze medalist(s)	Dartmouth	537.90
4	Western State (CO)	518.66
5	Idaho	509.06
6	Utah	466.71
7	Washington State	301.11
8	Wyoming	258.45

== Individual events ==
Location in Utah

Four events were held, which yielded seven individual titles.

- Friday: Cross Country
- Saturday: Downhill
- Sunday: Slalom, Jumping

Event	Champion		
Event	Skier	Team	Time/Score
Alpine	Ralph Miller	Dartmouth	4:16.0
Cross Country	Mack Miller	Western State	55:52.4
Downhill	Ralph Miller	Dartmouth	2:07.0
Jumping	Alf Vincelette	Denver	217.5
Nordic	(Norway) Harol Riiber	Denver	7:17.4
Skimeister	Ralph Miller	Dartmouth	371.0
Slalom	(Japan) Chiharu Igaya (3)	Dartmouth	1:44.0

== See also ==
- List of NCAA skiing programs
