= KWCR =

KWCR may refer to:

- KWCR (radio station), a radio station at Weber State University
- KXNO (AM), a radio station (1460 AM) licensed to serve Des Moines, Iowa, United States, which held the call sign KWCR from 1925 to 1935
- KNKL (FM), a radio station (88.1 FM) licensed to serve Tremonton, Utah, United States, which held the call sign KWCR-FM from 1966 to 2017
