= Spain at the 1960 Winter Olympics =

- IOC code: ESP (SPA used at these Games)
- NOC: Spanish Olympic Committee
- Website: www.coe.es (in Spanish)

in Squaw Valley
- Competitors: 4 (3 men, 1 woman) in 1 sport
- Flag bearer: Luis Sánchez
- Medals: Gold 0 Silver 0 Bronze 0 Total 0

Winter Olympics appearances (overview)
- 1936; 1948; 1952; 1956; 1960; 1964; 1968; 1972; 1976; 1980; 1984; 1988; 1992; 1994; 1998; 2002; 2006; 2010; 2014; 2018; 2022; 2026

Spain competed at the 1960 Winter Olympics in Squaw Valley, United States.

== Alpine skiing ==
Men

Athlete	Event	Race 1		Race 2		Total	
Athlete	Event	Time	Rank	Time	Rank	Time	Rank
Luis Arias	Downhill					2:29.8	51
Luis Sánchez	Downhill					2:28.3	44
Manuel García-Moran	Downhill					2:27.6	42
Manuel García-Moran	Giant Slalom					2:14.8	47
Luis Sánchez	Giant Slalom					2:13.6	45
Luis Arias	Giant Slalom					2:13.2	42
Luis Sánchez	Slalom	1:52.1	52	DSQ	–	DSQ	–
Manuel García-Moran	Slalom	1:32.3	50	1:25.7	31	2:58.0	34
Luis Arias	Slalom	1:24.3	39	1:16.2	25	2:40.5	24

Women

Athlete	Event	Race 1		Race 2		Total	
Athlete	Event	Time	Rank	Time	Rank	Time	Rank
Marían Navarro	Downhill					1:49.7	24
Marían Navarro	Giant Slalom					DSQ	–
Marían Navarro	Slalom	1:05.2	28	1:02.8	21	2:08.0	23

== Sources ==
- Official Olympic Reports
- Olympic Winter Games 1960, full results by sports-reference.com
