= Jim Barrier =

American skier (1940–2000)

Personal information
- Full name: James Marvin Barrier
- Born: August 7, 1940 Wallace, Idaho, U.S.
- Died: August 26, 2000 (aged 60) Indio, California, U.S.

Sport
- Sport: Alpine skiing

James Marvin Barrier (August 7, 1940 – August 26, 2000) was an American alpine ski racer and a member of the United States Ski Team. He competed in two events at the 1960 Winter Olympics.

Born and raised in Wallace, Idaho, Barrier learned to race at nearby Lookout Pass.

== Olympic results ==
Year	Age	Slalom	Giant Slalom	Super-G	Downhill	Combined
1960	19	DNF1	16	not run	—	not run
