= Inger Bjørnbakken =

Norwegian alpine skier (1933–2021)

Personal information
- Born: 28 December 1933 Bærum, Norway
- Died: 13 February 2021 (aged 87)
Medal record
Women's alpine skiing
World Championships
Gold medal – first place	1958 Bad Gastein	Slalom

Inger Bjørnbakken (28 December 1933 – 13 February 2021) was a Norwegian alpine skier.

== Career ==
She was born in Bærum and represented the club Bærums SK.

She finished tied for sixth place (with fellow Norwegian Astrid Sandvik) in the women's slalom at the 1956 Winter Olympics at Cortina d'Ampezzo. She also finished fourteenth in the giant slalom. Two years later, Bjørnbakken won the women's slalom at the 1958 World Championships in Bad Gastein. To date, she is the only Norwegian female world champion in alpine skiing. She later finished fourteenth in the slalom and 20th in the giant slalom of the 1960 Winter Olympics. In the Holmenkollen Kandahar event she won seven races between 1955 and 1959. She also took seven national championship titles between 1956 and 1959.

For her alpine world championship, Bjørnbakken earned the Holmenkollen Medal that same year (shared with Håkon Brusveen). Bjørnbakken is one of only eleven non-Nordic skiers to ever win the Holmenkollen medal (Stein Eriksen, King Haakon VII, Boghild Niskin, Sandvik, King Olav V, Erik Håker, Jacob Vaage, King Harald V, Queen Sonja, and Ingemar Stenmark. All were from Norway except Stenmark, who is from Sweden).

Bjørnbakken died in a fire in her hometown on 13 February 2021, at the age of 87.
