= Gray Rocks =

Former Mont-Tremblant ski resort, 1906–2009

- Interactive map of Gray Rocks
- Location: Mont-Tremblant, Quebec
- Coordinates: 46°9′30″N 74°35′20″W
- Vertical: 189 m (620 ft)
- Trails: 22
- Lift system: (closed) 4 chairlifts (1 quad (removed), 3 double)
- Lift capacity: 5300 skiers/hr
- Terrain parks: 1
- Snowfall: 420 cm (170 in) per year
- Snowmaking: 95%
- Night skiing: no

Gray Rocks was a year-round privately owned resort in the Laurentian Mountains of Quebec, Canada, first developed as a ski destination on Sugarloaf Hill (French: Le Pain de Sucre). The ski hill had 22 downhill trails: four easy, ten intermediate, eight expert (of which two were "double diamond"). Also available was a snowboarding park and instruction from the Snow Eagle Ski School.

First opened in 1906, the hotel closed during the Great Recession of 2009; 70 percent of the main building was destroyed by a suspicious fire on the evening of 25 November 2014.

== History ==
Gray Rocks was established in 1905 by George Wheeler, originally of New Hampshire. His granddaughter, Lucille Wheeler, won the bronze medal for women's downhill skiing at the 1956 Winter Olympics.

In 1948, Réal Charette, a former World War II winter warfare instructor, became the first Canadian to be appointed a director of a ski school in Canada, the Snow Eagle Ski School at Gray Rocks.

The music video for the song "De Do Do Do, De Da Da Da" by English rock band The Police was filmed at Grey Rocks in 1981.

In warmer seasons, activities included golf with two courses, as well as boating on adjoining Lac Ouimet, swimming (in pool or lake), tennis, horseback riding, bicycling, and hiking. The resort facilities included a 105-room hotel, 56 condominium units, French cuisine restaurant, and spa.

At the end of March 2009, Gray Rocks was closed as both a hotel and ski resort. Of the two golf courses, La Belle closed in 2020 after 100 years in operation; the second, La Bête, was taken over by Clublink. Several owners of the condos previously associated with Gray Rocks created a vacation home rental operation, Lac Ouimet Rentals, that now operates under the name Village des Soleils.

== See also ==
- List of golf courses in Quebec
