= Ernst Hinterseer =

Austrian alpine skier (born 1932)

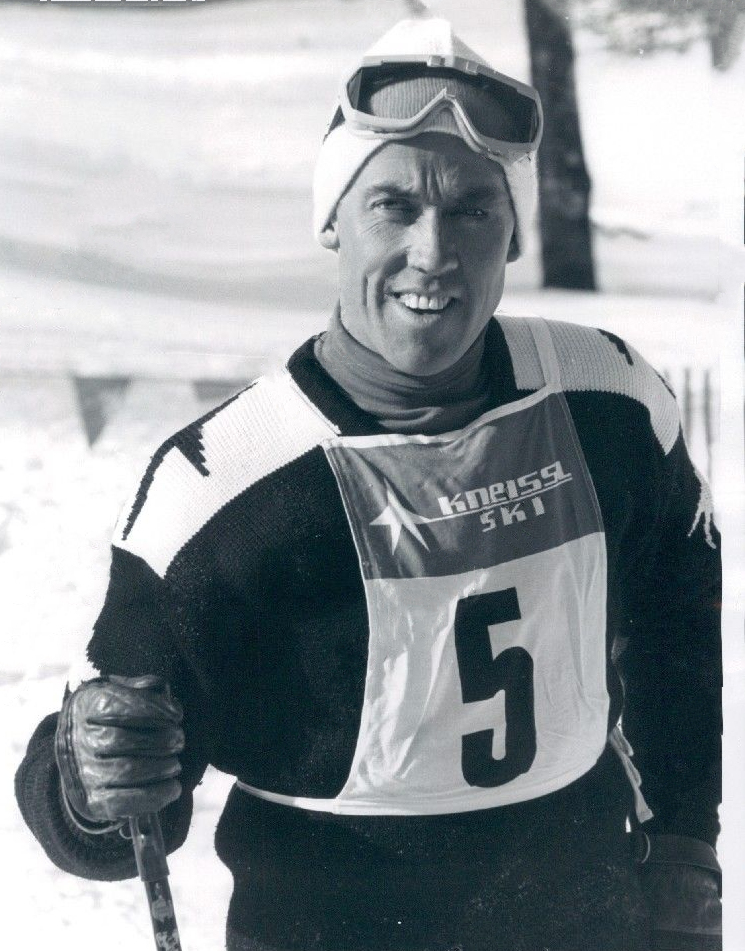
- Hinterseer in 1963

Personal information
- Born: 28 February 1932 (age 94) Kitzbühel, Austria

Sport
- Sport: Alpine skiing
- Club: Kitzbüheler Ski Club
Medal record
Representing Austria
Olympic Games
Gold medal – first place	1960 Squaw Valley	Slalom
Bronze medal – third place	1960 Squaw Valley	Giant slalom

Ernst Hinterseer (born 28 February 1932) is a retired alpine skier from Austria. He participated in the 1956 Winter Olympics in Cortina d'Ampezzo, placing sixth in the giant slalom. At the 1960 Winter Olympics he won a gold medal in the slalom, and bronze in the giant slalom. He was only a substitute for the slalom, and was trailing in fifth place after the first leg.

Hinterseer won two national titles: in the giant slalom in 1954 and in a combined event in 1956. He became an "Austrian sportsman of the Year 1960" and in 1997 was awarded the "Goldenes Ehrenzeichen für Verdienste um die Republik Österreich" ("Order in gold of merit for services rendered to the Republic of Austria").

Hinterseer was born in a farmer's family. After World War II he started an apprenticeship as a carpenter, but focused on skiing after graduating from school. After the 1960 Olympics he turned professional and won the 1963 world title. He retired in 1967 to become a coach, and in 1974–76 headed the Austrian Ski Federation. His sons Ernst, Georg, and Hansi also became ski racers, while his grandson Lukas Hinterseer played football for the Austria national football team.

== See also ==
- Bee Hive Ski Races, Hinterseer was a winner in 1963 and 1964
