= Frieda Dänzer =

Swiss alpine skier (1930–2015)

Personal information
- Born: 16 November 1930 Adelboden, Switzerland
- Died: 21 January 2015 (aged 84)
Medal record
Women's alpine skiing
Representing Switzerland
Olympic Games
Silver medal – second place	1956 Cortina d'Ampezzo	Downhill
World Championships
Gold medal – first place	1958 Bad Gastein	Combined
Silver medal – second place	1956 Cortina d'Ampezzo	Combined
Silver medal – second place	1958 Bad Gastein	Downhill
Bronze medal – third place	1958 Bad Gastein	Giant Slalom

Frieda Dänzer (16 November 1930 – 21 January 2015) was a Swiss Alpine skier who competed internationally during the 1950s. She won a silver medal in the downhill at the 1956 Winter Olympics in Cortina d'Ampezzo. At the 1958 World Championships in Bad Gastein she won gold in the alpine combined, as well as silver in the downhill and bronze in the giant slalom. Over the course of her career she won a total of five Olympic and World Championship medals.

== Skiing career ==
Dänzer grew up in Adelboden in the canton of Bern, where she developed her skiing ability from an early age. She later became one of Switzerland's leading female alpine skiers of the 1950s. The start of her sporting career was marked by setbacks. She joined the Swiss national team in January 1950, but shortly afterwards suffered serious injuries in a fall that broke her tibia and fibula and forced her to stop skiing for about a year. Despite the accident, she later defeated leading Swiss skiers such as Rosmarie Bleuer and Irène Molitor.

She was Swiss champion in the downhill in 1954, 1957 and 1958, and also won Swiss titles in the giant slalom, slalom and combined.

At the 1956 Winter Olympics in Cortina d'Ampezzo, Switzerland achieved a one-two finish in the downhill with Madeleine Berthod winning gold and Dänzer taking silver. At the same Games she finished tenth in the slalom and eleventh in the giant slalom.

At the 1958 World Championships in Bad Gastein she won gold in the alpine combined, silver in the downhill and bronze in the giant slalom.

After retiring from competitive skiing around 1960, Dänzer obtained a professional ski instructor qualification in 1962. During this training she met Alfred Brunner, whom she married in 1966. The couple later moved to Brunnen in the canton of Schwyz, where they founded and ran a ski school and remained closely connected to the sport.
