= Frank Brown (alpine skier) =

American alpine skier (1937–2016)

Personal information
- Born: April 16, 1937 Boise, Idaho, United States
- Died: June 4, 2016 (aged 79) McCall, Idaho, United States

Sport
- Sport: Alpine skiing

Frank Brown (April 16, 1937 – June 4, 2016) was an American alpine skier. He competed in the men's slalom at the 1960 Winter Olympics.
