= Hans-Peter Lanig =

German alpine skier (1935–2022)

Medal record

Men's alpine skiing

Representing Germany

Olympic Games
Silver medal – second place	1960 Squaw Valley	Downhill

Representing West Germany

World Championships
Bronze medal – third place	1960 Squaw Valley	Combined

Hans-Peter Lanig (7 December 1935 – 28 January 2022) was a German alpine skier who competed for the United Team of Germany in the 1956 Winter Olympics and in the 1960 Winter Olympics.

He was born in Bad Hindelang, Bavaria, Germany. He was the younger brother of Evi Lanig and the brother-in-law of Lorenz Nieberl.

In 1956 he finished fifth in the Alpine downhill event and seventh in the giant slalom competition.

Four years later he won the silver medal in the 1960 downhill contest. In the same year he finished seventh in the slalom event and 13th in the giant slalom competition.

Lanig died on 28 January 2022, at the age of 86.
