= Chiharu Igaya =

Japanese alpine skier (born 1931)

Chiharu Igaya OLY
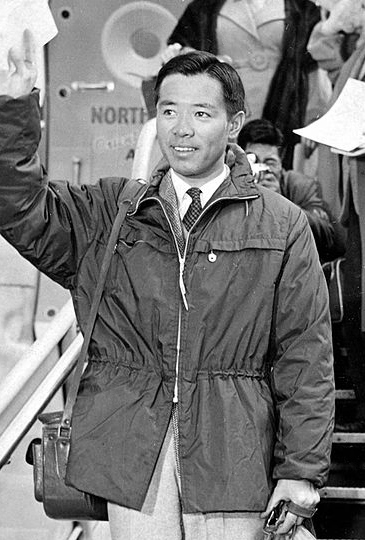
- Igaya in 1956

Personal information
- Born: May 20, 1931 (age 95) Tomari, Kunashiri (ja), Hokkaidō, Japan
- Height: 1.66 m (5 ft 5 in)

Skiing career
- Sport: Alpine skiing
- Club: Dartmouth College
- Disciplines: Slalom, giant slalom, Downhill, combined

Olympics
- Teams: 3 – (1952, 1956, 1960)
- Medals: 1 (0 gold)

World Championships
- Teams: 4 – (1952, 1956, 1958, 1960) includes Olympics
- Medals: 2 (0 gold)
Medal record
Men's alpine skiing
Representing Japan
Olympic Games
Silver medal – second place	1956 Cortina	Slalom
World Championships
Bronze medal – third place	1958 Bad Gastein	Slalom

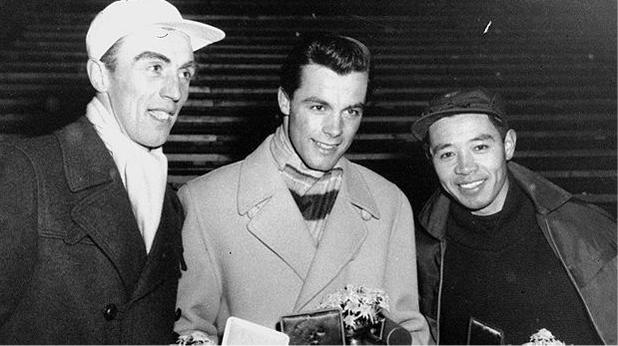
1956 Olympic slalom medalists: Stig Sollander, Toni Sailer (gold), and Igaya

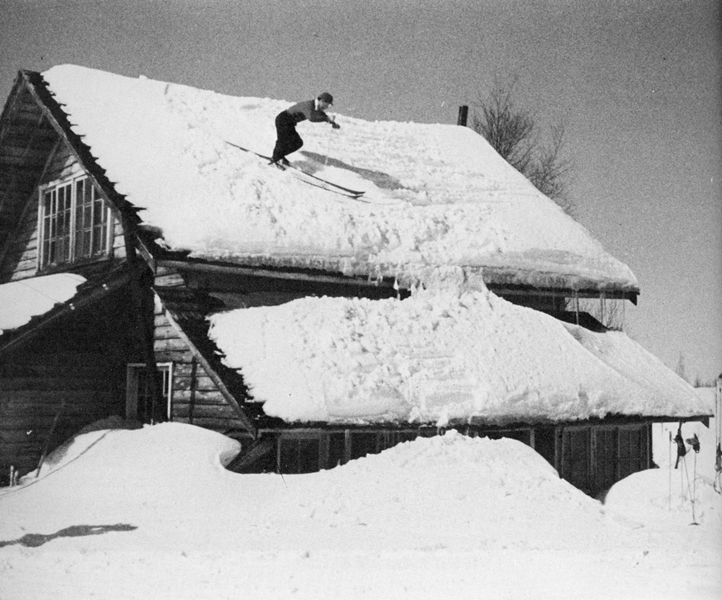
Igaya training on the roof of his house in 1951

Chiharu Igaya (猪谷 千春, Igaya Chiharu; born May 20, 1931) is a former Olympic alpine ski racer and silver medalist from Japan. He competed in three Winter Olympics (1952, 1956, 1960).

== Ski racing ==
Born in Tomari, Kunashiri (ja), Hokkaidō, Igaya attended college in the United States at Dartmouth in New Hampshire, where he raced for the Big Green and graduated in 1957. "Chick" won the U.S. national title in slalom in 1954 at Aspen, Colorado, and took a third consecutive NCAA title in slalom, his sixth individual, in 1957 at Snowbasin, Utah.

At the Olympics in 1952, Igaya finished eleventh in the slalom, 20th in the giant slalom, and 24th in the downhill. Four years later in 1956, he won the silver medal in the slalom, was eleventh in the giant slalom, but did not finish in the downhill. All three events were won by Toni Sailer of Austria. Igaya became the first ever Japanese and the first ever Asian to become a medalist at Olympic Winter Games. He remains the only Japanese to win a medal at an Alpine skiing Olympic event until today. At the 1960 Games, Igaya was twelfth in the slalom, 23rd in the giant slalom, and 34th in the downhill. Igaya also won a bronze medal in slalom at the World Championships in 1958, and finished fourth in the combined.

== After racing ==
After graduation, Igaya worked in insurance, eventually becoming president of the Japanese branch of AIU Insurance Company. In parallel, he served as a sports administrator. Igaya was a member of the FIS alpine skiing committee and vice-president of the International Triathlon Union. He was a member of the International Olympic Committee from 1982 to 2012, becoming vice-president in 2005, and an honorary member in 2012. At the Winter Olympics in 2018, Igaya was inducted into the Olympians for Life project for giving back to sport.

== World Championship results ==
Year	Age	Slalom	Giant Slalom	Super-G	Downhill	Combined
1952	20	11	20	not run	24	not run
1956	24	2	11	not run	DNF	—
1958	26	3	6	not run	15	4
1960	28	12	23	not run	34	10

From 1948 through 1980, the Winter Olympics were also the World Championships for alpine skiing.
At the World Championships from 1954 through 1980, the combined was a "paper race" using the results of the three events (DH, GS, SL).

== Olympic results ==
Year	Age	Slalom	Giant Slalom	Super-G	Downhill	Combined
1952	20	11	20	not run	24	not run
1956	24	2	11	not run	DNF	not run
1960	28	12	23	not run	34	not run

== NCAA titles ==
- Slalom (3): 1955, 1956, 1957
- Alpine (2): 1955, 1956
- Downhill: 1955
