= Lucile Wheeler =

Canadian alpine skier (born 1935)

Lucile Wheeler CM
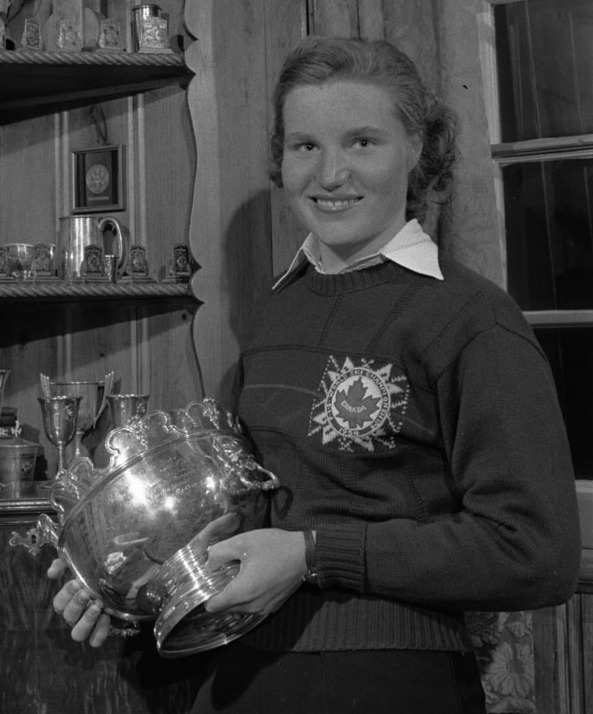

Personal information
- Born: January 14, 1935 (age 91) Sainte-Jovite, Quebec, Canada

Skiing career
- Sport: Alpine skiing ♀
- Disciplines: Downhill, giant slalom, slalom, combined

Olympics
- Teams: 2 – (1952, 1956)
- Medals: 1 (0 gold)

World Championships
- Teams: 5 – (1950, '52, '54, '56, '58) includes two Olympics
- Medals: 4 (2 gold)
Medal record
Women's alpine skiing
Representing Canada
Olympic Games
Bronze medal – third place	1956 Cortina	Downhill
World Championships
Gold medal – first place	1958 Bad Gastein	Downhill
Gold medal – first place	1958 Bad Gastein	Giant slalom
Silver medal – second place	1958 Bad Gastein	Combined

Lucile Wheeler CM (born January 14, 1935) is a former alpine ski racer from Canada. She was a double world champion in 1958, the first North American to win a world title in the downhill event.

== Early years ==
Wheeler was born in Quebec and grew up in the village of Sainte-Jovite in the Laurentian Mountains. Her family was instrumental in promoting the sport of skiing and her grandfather George Wheeler built the famous Gray Rocks ski centre at Mont-Tremblant, Quebec. He had moved to Quebec from Chazy, New York in the late nineteenth century, hoping to make it rich in the lumber business, but was wiped out by a forest fire.

Taught to ski at the age of two, Wheeler's skills were such that she was soon competing against older ski racers. At age 10, she finished seventh in a downhill event at Mont Tremblant in a race that was open to participants of all ages. She won the Canadian junior ski championship in 1947 at age 12 and at 14 was selected to compete for Canada at the World Championships in 1950 in Aspen, Colorado, the first major alpine event held outside of Europe. However, her parents felt she was too young at age 15 to miss school and did not allow her to go.

== Racing career ==
The early 1950s was still a time when resources for Canadian skiers were extremely limited. There was very little in the way of government funding to cover expenses for skiers wishing to compete on the world stage or to pay for professional training. Recognizing their daughter's gifts, her parents bore the expense for her to spend several winters training in Kitzbühel, Austria. It paid off when she became the first North American Olympic medalist in the downhill in alpine skiing, winning the bronze in 1956 at Cortina d'Ampezzo, Italy. She followed this with a spectacular performance at the 1958 World Championships in Bad Gastein, Austria, where she won both the downhill and the giant slalom and took silver in the combined. Upon her return to Canada a month later, she received tumultuous receptions.

Wheeler's breakthrough performance resulted in an increase in government funding that enabled other Canadian skiers to compete at the international level. Her achievements were also instrumental in increasing the popularity of the sport both nationwide and in her native Quebec where what was once a remote destination in the Laurentian mountains for only a limited few became a thriving ski area with an abundance of quality facilities that attracts hundreds of thousands of skiers every winter.

== World Championship results ==
Year	Age	Slalom	Giant Slalom	Super-G	Downhill	Combined
1950	15	DNS	DNS	not run	DNS	not run
1952	17	26	27	not run	27	not run
1954	19	DSQ2	18	not run	7	—
1956	21	DSQ2	6	not run	3	—
1958	23	14	1	not run	1	2

From 1948 through 1980, the Winter Olympics were also the World Championships for alpine skiing.
Wheeler qualified for the 1950 championships, but did not attend.

== Olympic results ==
Year	Age	Slalom	Giant Slalom	Super-G	Downhill	Combined
1952	17	26	27	not run	27	not run
1956	21	DSQ2	6	not run	3	not run

== After racing ==
Following her retirement from competitive racing at age 24 in 1959, Wheeler, along with Réal Charette, was a ski instructor in a film made at the Banff ski resort that won the American Library Association's award as the best educational sports film of 1960. In June 1960, Wheeler married Kaye Vaughan, former player with the Ottawa Rough Riders and member of the Canadian Football League Hall of Fame. The couple lived for a time in Ottawa, but in 1967 they moved to the village of Knowlton, Quebec, in the heart of a ski area in the Eastern Townships. The mother of two children, she organized a ski program at Knowlton High School for children aged 14 and under.

== Honours ==
Wheeler was voted the Lou Marsh Trophy as Canada's most outstanding athlete of 1958 and was inducted into the Canadian Olympic Hall of Fame. In 1976, she was made a member of the Order of Canada, her country's highest civilian honour, and was inducted into the Canadian Sports Hall of Fame. South of the border, Wheeler was inducted into the U.S. Ski Hall of Fame in 1976.

Glen Mountain, a small Quebec ski hill in West Bolton, honoured her with a trail named "The Wheeler."

== See also ==
- List of alpine skiing world champions
