= Bulgaria at the 1960 Winter Olympics =

- IOC code: BUL
- NOC: Bulgarian Olympic Committee
- Website: www.bgolympic.org (in Bulgarian and English)

in Squaw Valley
- Competitors: 7 (4 men, 3 women) in 2 sports
- Medals: Gold 0 Silver 0 Bronze 0 Total 0

Winter Olympics appearances (overview)
- 1936; 1948; 1952; 1956; 1960; 1964; 1968; 1972; 1976; 1980; 1984; 1988; 1992; 1994; 1998; 2002; 2006; 2010; 2014; 2018; 2022; 2026; 2030

Bulgaria participated at the 1960 Winter Olympics in Squaw Valley, United States, held between 18 and 28 February 1960. The country's participation in the Games marked its fifth appearance at the Winter Olympics since its debut in the 1936 Games.

The Bulgarian team consisted of seven athletes who competed across two sports. Bulgaria had not won any medal in the Winter Olympics till the Games and did not win any medal in the current edition of the Games.

== Background ==
A National Olympic Committee (NOC) was formed in Bulgaria in 1923 and was recognized by the International Olympic Committee (IOC) the following year. The Bulgarian Olympic Committee sent its first delegation to the 1924 Summer Olympics. However, the country did not participate in the inaugural Winter Olympics held in the same year and first competed in the 1936 Games held in Germany.

The 1960 Winter Olympics were held in Squaw Valley, United States between 18 and 28 February 1960. The Bulgarian delegation consisted of seven athletes.

== Competitors ==
There were seven athletes including three women who took part in seven medal events across two sports.

Sport	Men	Women	Athletes
Alpine skiing	3	0	3
Cross-country skiing	1	3	4
Total	4	3	7

== Alpine skiing ==
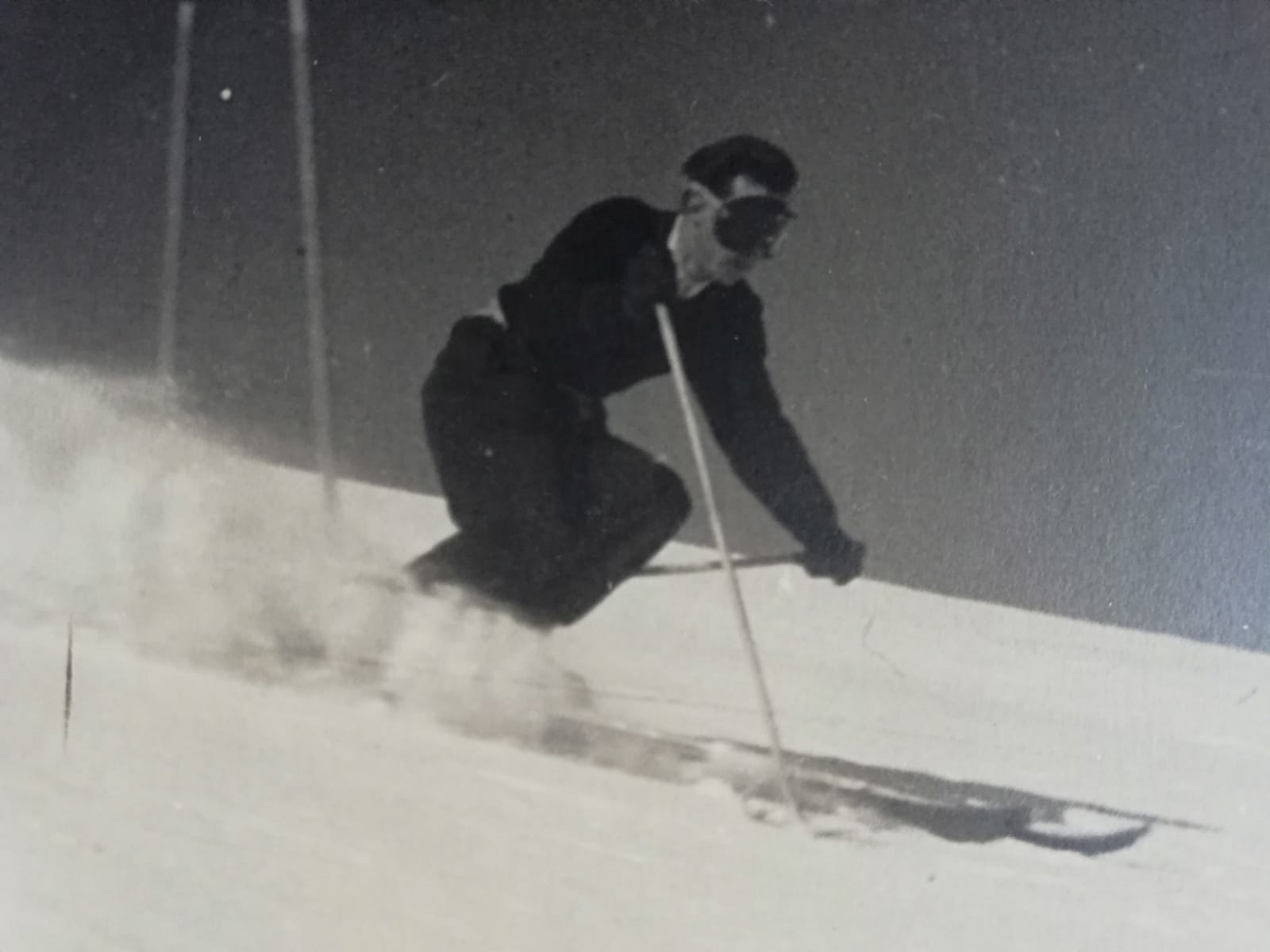
Georgi Dimitrov recorded the best finish for Bulgaria in the slalom event

Alpine skiing at the 1960 Winter Olympics took place at Squaw Valley Ski Resort and consisted of six events. Bulgaria entered three competitors who competed in all three men's events. All three competitors failed to win a medal with the best finish coming from Georgi Dimitrov in the slalom event.

Men

Athlete	Event	Race 1		Race 2		Total	
Athlete	Event	Time	Rank	Time	Rank	Time	Rank
Aleksandar Shalamanov	Downhill	—				2:29.0	47
Georgi Dimitrov	Downhill	—				2:20.2	30
Georgi Varoshkin	Downhill	—				2:20.0	29
Aleksandar Shalamanov	Giant Slalom	—				2:07.0	37
Georgi Dimitrov	Giant Slalom	—				2:02.9	30
Georgi Varoshkin	Giant Slalom	—				2:01.0	29
Aleksandar Shalamanov	Slalom	DSQ	–	–	–	DSQ	–
Georgi Varoshkin	Slalom	1:21.3	31	1:26.2	33	2:47.5	29
Georgi Dimitrov	Slalom	1:16.9	19	1:08.2	18	2:25.1	18

== Cross-country skiing ==
Cross-country skiing at the Games took place at McKinney Creek Stadium in Tahoma, California. Bulgaria entered four competitors including three women. Stefan Mitkov competed in three events in the men's category and had a best place finish of 22nd in the 50 km event. Of the three women competitors in the event, Krastana Stoeva recorded the best place finish in ninth.

Men

Athlete	Event	Final	
Athlete	Event	Total	Rank
Stefan Mitkov	15 km	56:55.4	33
Stefan Mitkov	30 km	2:03:54.3	31
Stefan Mitkov	50 km	3:26.32.5	22

Women

Athlete	Event	Final	
Athlete	Event	Total	Rank
Krastana Stoeva	10 km	41:44.0	9
Nadezhda Vasileva	10 km	44:32.8	19
Roza Dimova	10 km	45:45.8	22
