= Astrid Sandvik =

Norwegian alpine skier (born 1939)

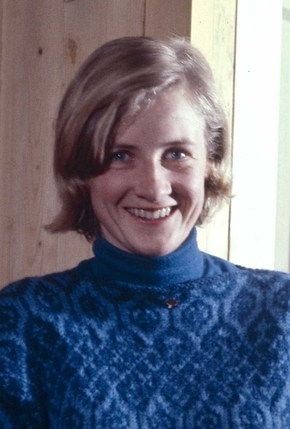
Astrid Sandvik in 1963

Astrid Sandvik (born 1 October 1939) is a Norwegian Alpine skier who finished tied for sixth place (with fellow Norwegian and 1958 Holmenkollen medalist Inger Bjørnbakken) in the women's slalom at the 1956 Winter Olympics in Cortina d'Ampezzo. In 1963, Sandvik was awarded the Holmenkollen medal (shared with Alevtina Kolchina, Pavel Kolchin, and Torbjørn Yggeseth.). Sandvik is one of only eleven non-Nordic skiers to win the Holmenkollen medal (Stein Eriksen, King Haakon VII, Boghild Niskin, Inger Bjørnbakken, Sandvik, King Olav V, Erik Håker, Jacob Vaage, King Harald V, and Queen Sonja (all from Norway); and Ingemar Stenmark (Sweden) are the others.).

She also finished fourth in the slalom twice at the Alpine Skiing World Championships (1958, 1962) and competed at three Winter Olympics.
