= Lorenz Possa =

Swiss cross-country skier (1934–2013)

Personal information
- Nationality: Swiss
- Born: 31 March 1934; Leukerbad, Switzerland
- Died: 8 January 2013 (aged 78); Leukerbad, Switzerland

Sport
- Sport: Cross-country skiing

Lorenz Possa (31 March 1934 – 8 January 2013) was a Swiss cross-country skier. He competed in the men's 15 kilometre event at the 1960 Winter Olympics.
