= Jakob Arduser =

Swiss alpine skier (born 1939)

Personal information
- Nationality: Swiss
- Born: 26 February 1939 (age 86); Klosters-Serneus, Switzerland

Sport
- Sport: Alpine skiing

Jakob Arduser (born 26 February 1939) is a Swiss alpine skier. He competed in the men's downhill at the 1960 Winter Olympics.
