= Marcel Huguenin =

Swiss cross-country skier (1930–2020)

Personal information
- Nationality: Swiss
- Born: 1 July 1930; La Brévine, Switzerland
- Died: 31 March 2020 (aged 89)

Sport
- Sport: Cross-country skiing

Marcel Huguenin (1 July 1930 – 31 March 2020) was a Swiss cross-country skier. He competed at the 1956 Winter Olympics and the 1960 Winter Olympics.
