= Larry Mason (speed skater) =

Canadian speed skater

Personal information
- Nationality: Canadian
- Born: 30 July 1935; Kendal, England
- Died: 12 August 2004 (aged 69); Calgary, Alberta, Canada

Sport
- Sport: Speed skating

Larry Mason (30 July 1935 – 12 August 2004) was a Canadian speed skater. He competed in three events at the 1960 Winter Olympics. In December 1962, he went to Europe as part of the national team composing of eight Canadian speed skaters, for a six-week training project in Sweden.
