= FIS Alpine World Ski Championships 1958 =

Skiing event in Bad Gastein, Salzburg, Austria

Coordinates: 47.11°N 13.15°E

- Host city: Bad Gastein, Salzburg, Austria
- Events: 6
- Opening: 1 February 1958
- Closing: 9 February 1958
- Opened by: Adolf Schärf

Location in Austria
Location in the Alps of Europe

The FIS Alpine World Ski Championships 1958 were held from 1 to 9 February in Bad Gastein, Salzburg, Austria.

Austrian Toni Sailer, 22, won three gold medals and a silver. The triple gold medalist from the 1956 Winter Olympics successfully defended three of his four world titles. Lucile Wheeler of Canada, 23, won two gold medals and a silver.

== Men's competitions ==
=== Downhill ===
Sunday, 9 February

Place	Name	Country	Time	Diff.
1st place, gold medalist(s)	Toni Sailer	Austria (AUT)	2:28.5	—
2nd place, silver medalist(s)	Roger Staub	Switzerland (SUI)	2:30.4	+ 1.9
3rd place, bronze medalist(s)	Jean Vuarnet	France (FRA)	2:32.3	+ 3.8
4	Willi Forrer	Switzerland (SUI)	2:32.7	+ 4.2
5	Adrien Duvillard	France (FRA)	2:33.5	+ 5.0
5	Mathias Leitner	Austria (AUT)	2:33.5	+ 5.0
5	Andreas Molterer	Austria (AUT)	2:33.5	+ 5.0

- In soft snow conditions, Sailer won his final competitive race and wrapped up the combined title as well.
  American Buddy Werner fell but finished 37th at 2:48.7, which ended his chances for a combined medal.

=== Giant Slalom ===
Wednesday, 5 February

Place	Name	Country	Time	Diff.
1st place, gold medalist(s)	Toni Sailer	Austria (AUT)	1:48.8	—
2nd place, silver medalist(s)	Josl Rieder	Austria (AUT)	1:52.6	+ 3.8
3rd place, bronze medalist(s)	François Bonlieu	France (FRA)	1:53.9	+ 5.1
3rd place, bronze medalist(s)	Roger Staub	Switzerland (SUI)	1:53.9	+ 5.1
5	Buddy Werner	United States (USA)	1:54.5	+ 5.7
6	Chiharu Igaya	Japan (JPN)	1:55.3	+ 6.5
6	Andreas Molterer	Austria (AUT)	1:55.3	+ 6.5

- After being edged out in the slalom, Sailer won the giant slalom by nearly four seconds.

=== Slalom ===
Sunday, 2 February

Place	Name	Country	Run 1	Run 2	Total	Diff.
1st place, gold medalist(s)	Josef Rieder	Austria (AUT)	57.7	57.4	1:55.1	—
2nd place, silver medalist(s)	Toni Sailer	Austria (AUT)	58.3	57.5	1:55.8	+ 0.7
3rd place, bronze medalist(s)	Chiharu Igaya	Japan (JPN)	56.7	60.0	1:56.7	+ 1.6
4	Buddy Werner	United States (USA)	59.6	59.2	1:58.8	+ 3.7
5	Roger Staub	Switzerland (SUI)	60.1	60.8	2:01.9	+ 6.8
6	Adolf Mathis	Switzerland (SUI)			2:02.6	+ 7.5

- In the opening race of the championships, Igaya of Japan, the 1956 Olympic silver medalist,
  led after the first run in an attempt to become the first champion from Asia, but finished with bronze.
- Rieder foiled another gold medal sweep by compatriot Sailer, who won silver.

=== Combined ===
Place	Name	Country	Points	DH	GS	SL
1st place, gold medalist(s)	Toni Sailer	Austria (AUT)	0.36	1st place, gold medalist(s)	1st place, gold medalist(s)	2nd place, silver medalist(s)
2nd place, silver medalist(s)	Josef Rieder	Austria (AUT)	6.36	8	2nd place, silver medalist(s)	1st place, gold medalist(s)
3rd place, bronze medalist(s)	Roger Staub	Switzerland (SUI)	8.63	2nd place, silver medalist(s)	3rd place, bronze medalist(s)	5
4	Chiharu Igaya	Japan (JPN)	12.06	15	6	3rd place, bronze medalist(s)
5	Andreas Molterer	Austria (AUT)	12.37	5	6	8
6	Raymond Bläsi	Switzerland (SUI)	18.93	11	13	12
7	Buddy Werner	United States (USA)	19.10	37	5	4

At the World Championships from 1954 through 1980, the combined was a "paper race" using the results of the three events (DH, GS, SL).

== Women's competitions ==
=== Downhill ===
Thursday, 6 February

Place	Name	Country	Time	Diff.
1st place, gold medalist(s)	Lucile Wheeler	Canada (CAN)	2:12.1	—
2nd place, silver medalist(s)	Frieda Dänzer	Switzerland (SUI)	2:12.4	+ 0.3
3rd place, bronze medalist(s)	Carla Marchelli	Italy (ITA)	2:12.5	+ 0.4
4	Pia Riva	Italy (ITA)	2:14.6	+ 2.5
5	Putzi Frandl	Austria (AUT)	2:15.7	+ 3.6
6	Astrid Sandvik	Norway (NOR)	2:16.0	+ 3.9
7	Anne Heggtveit	Canada (CAN)	2:16.3	+ 4.2
8	Hannelore Basler	West Germany (FRG)	2:16.5	+ 4.4
9	Vera Schenome	Italy (ITA)	2:16.7	+ 4.6
10	Penny Pitou	United States (USA)	2:17.3	+ 5.2

=== Giant Slalom ===
Saturday, 8 February

Place	Name	Country	Time	Diff.
1st place, gold medalist(s)	Lucile Wheeler	Canada (CAN)	1:54.6	—
2nd place, silver medalist(s)	Sally Deaver	United States (USA)	1:55.1	+ 0.5
3rd place, bronze medalist(s)	Frieda Dänzer	Switzerland (SUI)	1:55.4	+ 0.8
4	Annemarie Waser	Switzerland (SUI)	1:55.5	+ 0.9
5	Danièle Télinge	France (FRA)	1:55.6	+ 1.0
6	Berit Stuve	Norway (NOR)	1:56.4	+ 1.8
7	Pia Riva	Italy (ITA)		
8	Jerta Schir	Italy (ITA)		
9	Thea Hochleitner	Austria (AUT)		
10	Inger Bjørnbakken	Norway (NOR)		

=== Slalom ===
Monday, 3 February

Place	Name	Country	Run 1	Run 2	Time	Diff.
1st place, gold medalist(s)	Inger Bjørnbakken	Norway (NOR)	53.9	51.7	1:45.6	—
2nd place, silver medalist(s)	Putzi Frandl	Austria (AUT)	55.2	51.8	1:47.0	+ 1.4
3rd place, bronze medalist(s)	Annemarie Waser	Switzerland (SUI)	55.5	51.9	1:47.4	+ 1.8
4	Astrid Sandvik	Norway (NOR)	56.6	53.3	1:48.9	+ 3.3
5	Suzanne Thiollière-Guirand	France (FRA)	55.5	53.8	1:49.3	+ 3.7
6	Hilde Hofherr	Austria (AUT)			1:49.8	+ 4.2
7	Berit Stuve	Norway (NOR)				
8	Frieda Dänzer	Switzerland (SUI)			1:50.8	+ 5.2
8	Anne Heggtveit	Canada (CAN)	56.2	54.6	1:50.8	+ 5.2

- Defending and Olympic champion Renée Colliard of Switzerland fell during the second run.

=== Combined ===
Place	Name	Country	Points	DH	GS	SL
1st place, gold medalist(s)	Frieda Dänzer	Switzerland (SUI)	3.80	2nd place, silver medalist(s)	3rd place, bronze medalist(s)	8
2nd place, silver medalist(s)	Lucile Wheeler	Canada (CAN)	4.33	1st place, gold medalist(s)	1st place, gold medalist(s)	14
3rd place, bronze medalist(s)	Putzi Frandl	Austria (AUT)	6.12	5	11	2nd place, silver medalist(s)
4	Berit Stuve	Norway (NOR)	8.14		6	7
5	Danièle Télinge	France (FRA)	8.70		5	
6	Anne Heggtveit	Canada (CAN)	9.99	7	15	8

At the World Championships from 1954 through 1980, the combined was a "paper race" using the results of the three events (DH, GS, SL).

== Medals table ==
Place	Nation	Gold	Silver	Bronze	Total
1	Austria (AUT)	4	4	1	9
2	Canada (CAN)	2	1	–	3
3	Switzerland (SUI)	1	2	4	7
4	Norway (NOR)	1	–	–	1
5	United States (USA)	–	1	–	1
6	France (FRA)	–	–	2	2
7	Italy (ITA)	–	–	1	1
7	Japan (JPN)	–	–	1	1

== Video ==
- Gasteinertal.com – 1958 World Championships – (in German)
