= Fritz Kocher =

Swiss cross-country skier

Fritz Kocher (born 6 April 1928) was a Swiss cross-country skier who competed in the 1950s and 1960s. Competing in three Winter Olympics, he earned his best finish of seventh in the 4 x 10 km relay at Cortina d'Ampezzo in 1956.
