= Margaret Robb =

Canadian speed skater

Personal information
- Born: 17 June 1942 (age 82); Saskatoon, Saskatchewan, Canada

Sport
- Sport: Speed skating

Margaret Robb (born 17 June 1942) is a Canadian speed skater. She competed in four events at the 1960 Winter Olympics.
