= Alphonse Baume =

Swiss cross-country skier

Personal information
- Nationality: Swiss
- Born: 24 December 1933 Bern, Switzerland
- Died: 25 July 2014 (aged 80) Bern, Switzerland

Sport
- Sport: Cross-country skiing

Alphonse Baume (24 December 1933 – 25 July 2014) was a Swiss cross-country skier. He competed at the 1960 Winter Olympics and the 1964 Winter Olympics.
