= Roger Staub =

Swiss alpine skier (1936–1974)

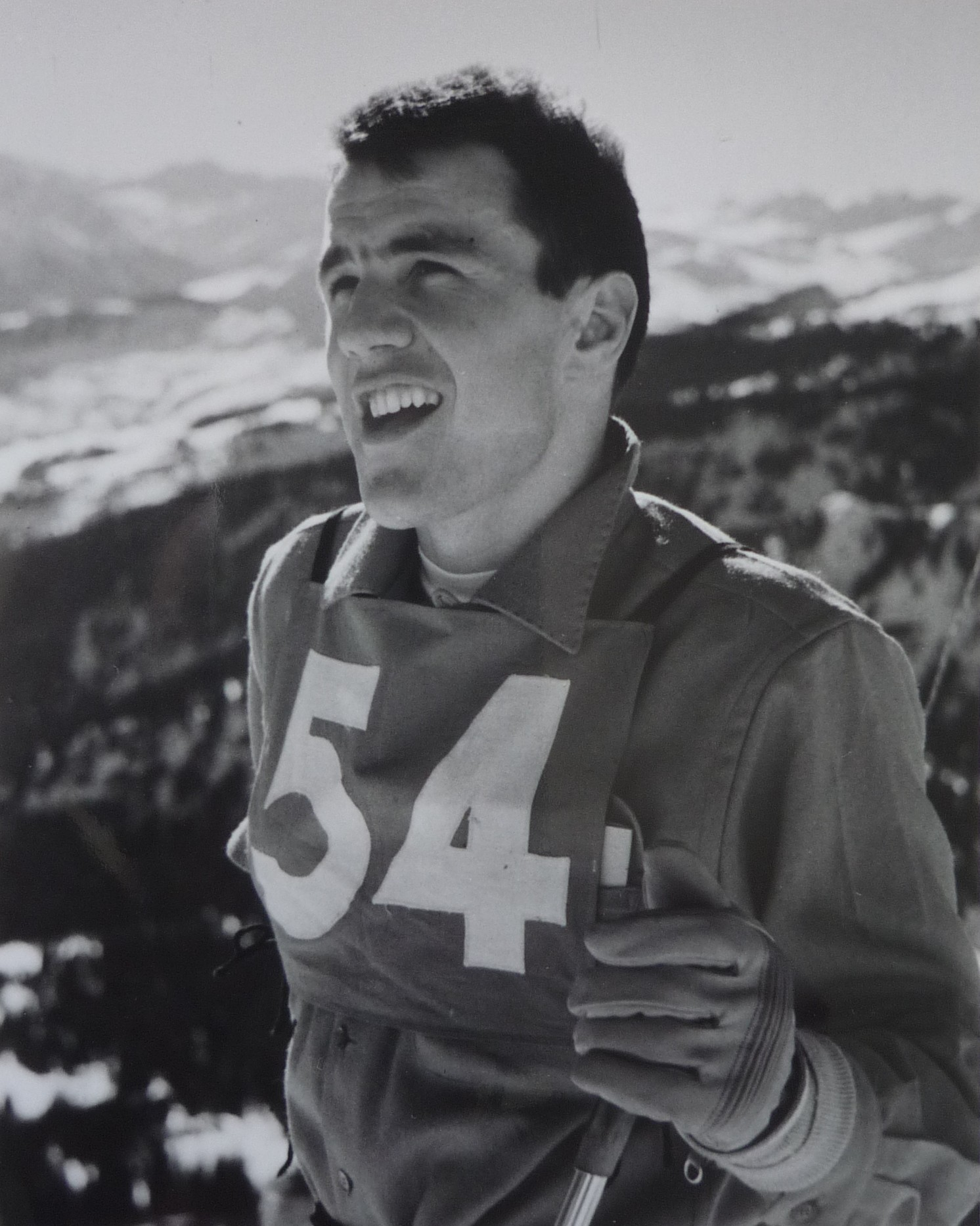
- Staub in 1959

Personal information
- Born: 1 July 1936 Arosa, Graubünden, Switzerland
- Died: 30 June 1974 (aged 37) Verbier, Valais, Switzerland

Skiing career
- Sport: Alpine skiing
- Club: SC Arosa
- Disciplines: Downhill, giant slalom, slalom, combined

Olympics
- Teams: 2 – (1956, 1960)
- Medals: 1 (1 gold)

World Championships
- Teams: 3 – (1956, 1958, 1960) includes Olympics
- Medals: 4 (1 gold)
Medal record
Men's alpine skiing
Representing Switzerland
Olympic Games
Gold medal – first place	1960 Squaw Valley	Giant slalom
World Championships
Silver medal – second place	1958 Bad Gastein	Downhill
Bronze medal – third place	1958 Bad Gastein	Giant slalom
Bronze medal – third place	1958 Bad Gastein	Combined

Roger Staub (1 July 1936 – 30 June 1974) was a Swiss alpine ski racer and Olympic gold medalist.

Born in Arosa, Graubünden, Staub won the giant slalom at the 1960 Winter Olympics in Squaw Valley (Note: His 1960 gold medal was awarded with delay; when Roger did finish the giant slalom race on February 22nd, he was called as the second-placed behind Josef Stiegler. There was an error in the time-clocking. After maybe 15 minutes, the time-clocking was corrected - Roger was 0.4 sec. better than Stiegler.) and also won multiple medals at the 1958 World Championships. He finished fourth in the Olympic downhill in 1956 at age 19. He also won a number of Swiss national titles.

After a brief career as a professional racer in the early 1960s, Staub became ski school director at the fledgling Vail resort in Colorado. He also had a ski school in Arosa and sporting goods interests in Switzerland.

During a summer visit to Switzerland in 1974 with his wife and young child, Staub was killed in a ski gliding accident near Verbier on the eve of his 38th birthday.

== World championship results ==
Year	Age	Slalom	Giant slalom	Super-G	Downhill	Combined
1956	19	—	—	not run	4	—
1958	21	5	3	not run	2	3
1960	23	DNF1	1	not run	5	DSQ

From 1948 through 1980, the Winter Olympics were also the World Championships for alpine skiing.

== Olympic results ==
Year	Age	Slalom	Giant slalom	Super-G	Downhill	Combined
1956	19	—	—	not run	4	not run
1960	23	DNF1	1	not run	5	not run
