= Alois Moser =

Canadian ski jumper

Alois Moser (17 June 1930 – 1 January 2013) was a Canadian ski jumper who competed in the 1960 Winter Olympics.
