= Victor Tagle =

Chilean alpine skier (born 1940)

Personal information
- Nationality: Chilean
- Born: 6 July 1940 (age 86)

Sport
- Sport: Alpine skiing

Victor Tagle (born 6 July 1940) is a Chilean alpine skier. He competed in two events at the 1960 Winter Olympics.
