= Irvin Servold =

Canadian Nordic combined and cross-country skier (1932–2026)

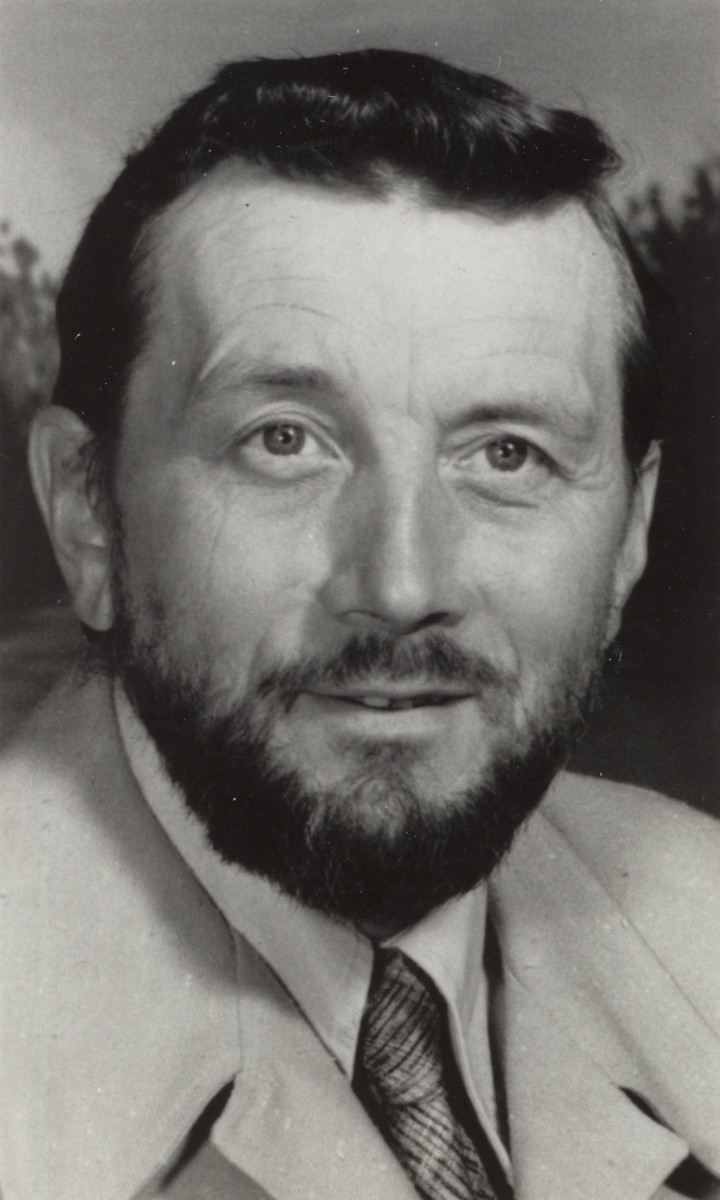

Personal information
- Full name: Irvin Benjamen Servold
- Born: 14 November 1932 Camrose, Alberta, Canada
- Died: 27 September 2026 (aged 93) Camrose, Alberta, Canada

Sport
- Country: Canada
- Sport: Cross-country skiing, Nordic combined
- Club: Camrose Ski Club

Irvin Benjamen Servold (14 November 1932 – 27 September 2026) was a Canadian Nordic combined and cross-country skier who competed in the 1956 Winter Olympics and in the 1960 Winter Olympics.

== Biography ==
Irvin Benjamen Servold was born in Camrose, Alberta, Canada, on 14 November 1932. He dedicated much of his life to skiing, holding various roles in organizations such as the Canadian Olympic Association (COA), the Coaching Association of Canada, and the Canadian Association of Nordic Ski Instructors. He played a key role in the Canadian Ski Association (CSA), leading the Jumping and Cross Country Committees for the Alberta Division. On a national level, he was part of the Nordic Combined and Cross Country Program Committee and served as a technical advisor for the Cross Country and Jumping Committee. Additionally, he was the Chief of Competition for several national championships in cross country, jumping, and Nordic Combined and took part in judging multiple national ski events, including those in Lahti, Finland. He also served as a technical delegate for various national competitions and the Canada Winter Games.

In his work with the Canadian Olympic Committee, he assisted in selecting sites for the Calgary 1988 Winter Olympics and contributed to the planning for the Nordic World Ski Championships in Oslo, Norway. As a coach, he instructed at national coaching courses and worked with Alberta teams in cross country and jumping, as well as national teams participating in events like the Myasma Ski Games in Sapporo, Japan, and the Pre-Olympic Nordic competitions in Sarajevo, Bosnia and Herzegovina.

He had a distinguished competitive career, representing Canada in the Nordic team at the 1956 Winter Olympics in Cortina d’Ampezzo, Italy, where he competed in the Individual Men’s Nordic Combined event. Four years later, he participated in the Squaw Valley Olympics in 1960, racing in the 15 km and 30 km Classic events, along with the Nordic Combined. He began competing at just 7 years old and quickly emerged as a champion in Alberta for cross country skiing, ski jumping, and Nordic Combined. He also won national championships in Nordic Combined in 1955 and again in 1972.

In college competition, he earned 3rd place in ski jumping in 1958 and took 1st place in cross country skiing three times in 1958, 1959, and 1961. He also participated in the Nordic Combined and USA cross country relay events. His significant contributions to sports led to his induction into the Alberta Sports Hall of Fame in 1980.

Servold died in Camrose on 27 September 2026, at the age of 93. Irvin's brother, Clarence Servold, was also a Canadian cross-country skier.
