= Diego Schweizer =

Argentine alpine skier (born 1938)

Personal information
- Born: 19 July 1938 (age 88) Buenos Aires, Argentina

Sport
- Sport: Alpine skiing

Diego Schweizer (born 19 July 1938) is an Argentine alpine skier. He competed in two events at the 1960 Winter Olympics.
