= KNKL (FM) =

K-Love radio station in Tremonton, Utah

- Tremonton, Utah; United States
- Broadcast area: Logan, Utah
- Frequency: 88.1 MHz
- Branding: K-Love

Programming
- Format: Contemporary Christian music
- Network: K-Love

Ownership
- Owner: Educational Media Foundation

History
- First air date: June 6, 1966 (as KWCR-FM in Ogden)
- Former call signs: KWCR-FM (1966–2017); KUAO (2017–2019)
- Call sign meaning: Northern Utah K-Love

Technical information
- Licensing authority: FCC
- Facility ID: 71394
- Class: A
- ERP: 8,600 watts
- HAAT: 359 meters
- Transmitter coordinates: 41°53′42.9″N 112°4′45.9″W
- Translator: 98.3 K252EH (Park City)

Links
- Public license information: Public file; LMS
- Website: klove.com

KNKL (88.1 MHz) is a contemporary Christian music radio station in Tremonton, Utah, United States. The station is owned and operated by the Educational Media Foundation (EMF) and broadcasts EMF's K-Love programming.

For nearly 50 years, the KNKL license was KWCR-FM, which was the student-run radio station of Weber State University in Ogden. In 2012, a demolition of a dormitory that housed the station's transmitter and antenna forced the university to find a new location. However, the university failed to find a suitable site, and KWCR became an online-only radio station in 2015. The university sold the license two years later to EMF, which moved the signal north in 2019 to cover Logan and northern Utah.

== As KWCR-FM ==
=== Early years ===
No rock-and-roll or country and western music will be played, as this station will represent Weber State College as an institute of knowledge, not a mighty go-go stomp.

— The Signpost on the new station's programming

Today's KNKL began life June 6, 1966, as KWCR-FM, the student radio station of Weber State College in Ogden. (The KWCR call letters were selected to stand for "Weber College Radio".) The 10-watt outlet was based in Room 455 of the Fine Arts Center; it operated during evening hours and was entirely run by Weber State students. The June date represented a five-month delay from an originally projected launch of January 10. Prior to the launch of KWCR-FM, the lone broadcast productions of the college were a series of educational shows aired over KOET, the educational television station operated by the Ogden city school board.

The station gradually grew, adding afternoon programming in 1968; during this time, it aired a "purple and white" middle-of-the-road format during the afternoon, light classical music in the evenings and educational programs after 7 p.m. Despite being on the air three years and operating 10 hours a day by 1969, student awareness of the radio station was low.

The 1970s saw KWCR flip its schedule to air educational programming in the afternoons and music after 6 p.m. in 1971; at this time, it was the only college radio station in Utah with a national network affiliation, airing news programming from ABC. The music had also changed to a progressive rock format, and the station had begun broadcasting on Saturdays and over summer break for the first time. 90 minutes of Sunday broadcasts followed in 1973. While contents regularly varied, educational programming included news and other taped features, while the station also aired Weber State and high school sports events. However, all of this activity took place in the same studio, on an annual budget of just $500, which a staffer termed "sad". In 1974, a campus policy board censured the station for the damages left behind by a concert it sponsored, including a broken window and burn marks on the floor.

KWCR did not broadcast during school breaks; in the fall of 1974, for instance, it did not resume operations until October 21, and it returned on January 13, 1975, after winter break. This changed over Christmas 1977, when the station operated through the holidays for the first time. In 1980, KWCR increased power to 130 watts; three years later, it began stereo operations and added improved equipment after the owner of Ogden commercial station KDAB donated $7,000.

=== New formats, more power and "The Beat" ===
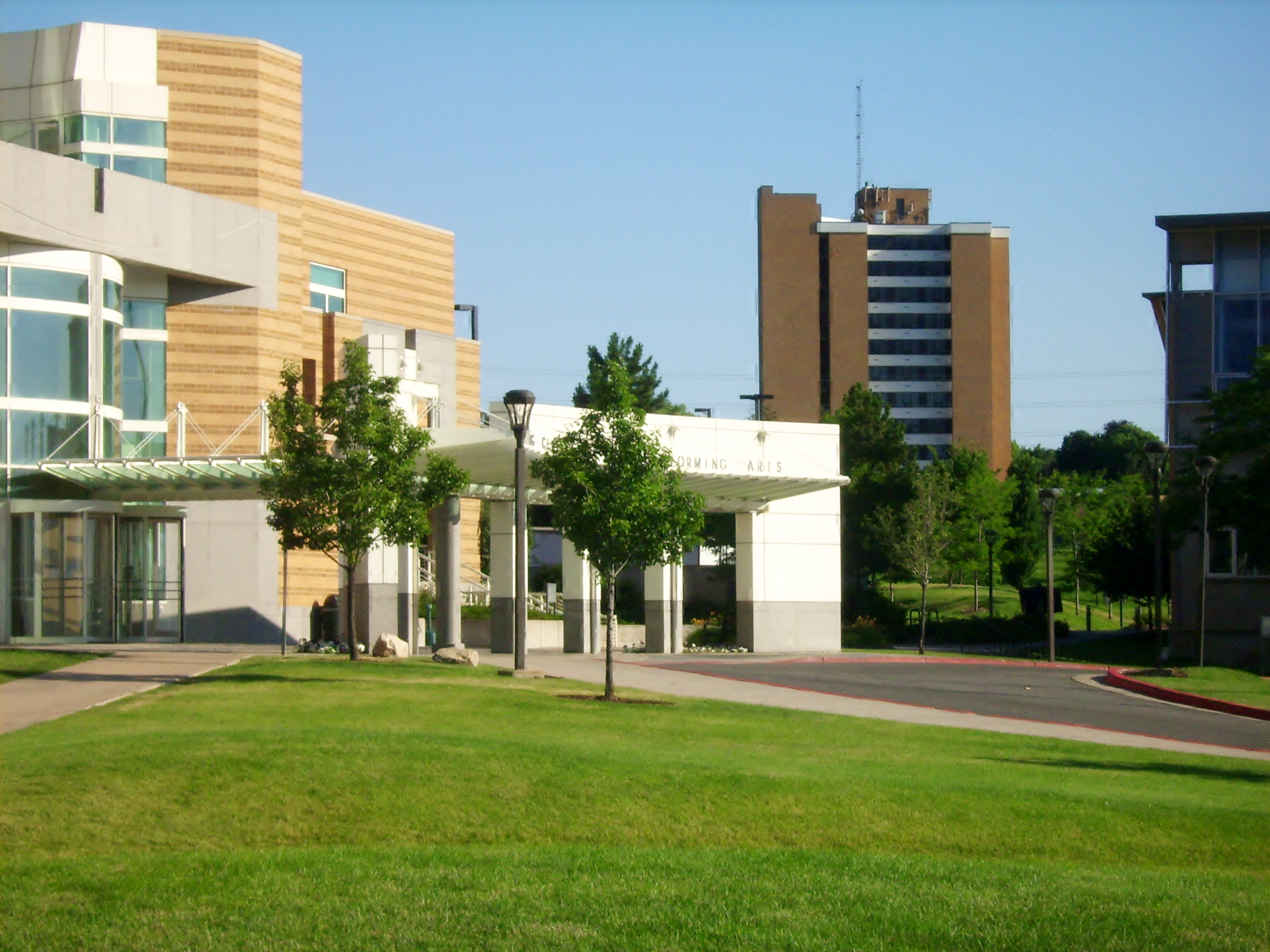
KWCR's transmitter and antenna were relocated to Promontory Tower in 1991; the tower is visible in this 2009 photo. Promontory Tower was demolished in 2012.

The station celebrated 20 years on the air in 1986, still playing largely a rock format, still largely underfunded, and facing difficulties with its aging transmitter that often kept it off the air for extended periods; as part of its anniversary events, KWCR held an on-air fund appeal for the first time.

The 1986–87 school year saw preparations for a number of major changes. The studios, along with the rest of the communications department, relocated to a former annex building known as Annex 3, while work began to pursue a transmitter relocation to the Promontory Tower.

In 1989, Gary Toyn, the station manager at the time, had an idea to commemorate those who died in the 1989 Tiananmen Square massacre: a moment of silence on July 4 at 3:20 ET, corresponding to 4:20 a.m., when the first dissident was shot. Toyn called his friends that ran stations at UCLA and Colorado State University; before long, the Intercollegiate Broadcasting System had caught wind of the idea. Ultimately, more than 2,000 collegiate stations, as well as commercial outlets, Voice of America and Radio Free Europe, participated, and Governor Norman H. Bangerter issued a proclamation.

After two decades of bad programming, playing heavy metal music and being on-the-air-off-again, we wanted to make changes that would make an impact and contribute to the college and community, and not be an ear-sore.

— Gary Toyn, KWCR station manager, on the 1989 change to "The Beat"

A comprehensive format revision came in 1988, when the station moved to a more consistent album-oriented rock approach from a block programming format with a heavy metal lean. A year later, however, KWCR adopted a dance-music format and the name "The Beat", a change that substantially increased interest and listenership. Unlike in the past, when call-in contests might have dragged on for hours awaiting a caller, the station's lines filled up nearly instantly. The format flip was marked with a Labor Day charitable event, titled "Trash the Thrash", in which KWCR's old heavy metal records were thrown like Frisbees. Along with the new format came 24-hour broadcasting. In its first year as The Beat, underwriting revenue exceeded that received in the previous 10 years combined. However, success did not stop disputes over the station's format, which sometimes manifested as bills in the student senate.

The late 1980s and early 1990s were also spent chasing a power increase to 3,000 watts. Planned as soon as 1986, fundraising efforts included a "3000 Watt Dance" sponsored by the station. The necessary $40,000 expenditure for a new transmitter was approved by the Federal Communications Commission and school administration in 1988 only for the latter to order efforts to cease in April 1989 because it had no underwriters and was almost entirely dependent on student fees. As the existing 100-watt transmitter aged, station staff were required to throw snowballs at it to knock off the ice that formed, as the transmitter did not get warm enough to melt it in cold weather. It was not until May 1991 that KWCR relocated to Promontory Tower and activated its higher-power facilities, after two weeks off the air; the power increase attracted underwriting attention from businesses as far away as Salt Lake City and expanded the coverage of a new radio reading service subcarrier and the station's specialty programming in Spanish. The transmitter, however, was not entirely new. It had been purchased by engineering professor Bill Clapp from a man in Texas for $300 after it was struck by lightning; the equipment was being stored in his garage.

With KWCR's transmitter situation settled, new problems emerged when Annex 3, which housed the communication department, was slated for demolition in 1992 because of asbestos abatement concerns. A studio move to the Shepherd Union Building was not possible in time, requiring a trailer to be rented and placed near Promontory Tower. During this time, one KWCR DJ was tapped to become the program director of KKBE-FM, a short-lived contemporary hit radio station licensed to Ogden and serving Salt Lake City; twelve former and current KWCR staffers were employed by the station in 1993, many in on-air and management positions.

=== The Edge and Weber FM ===
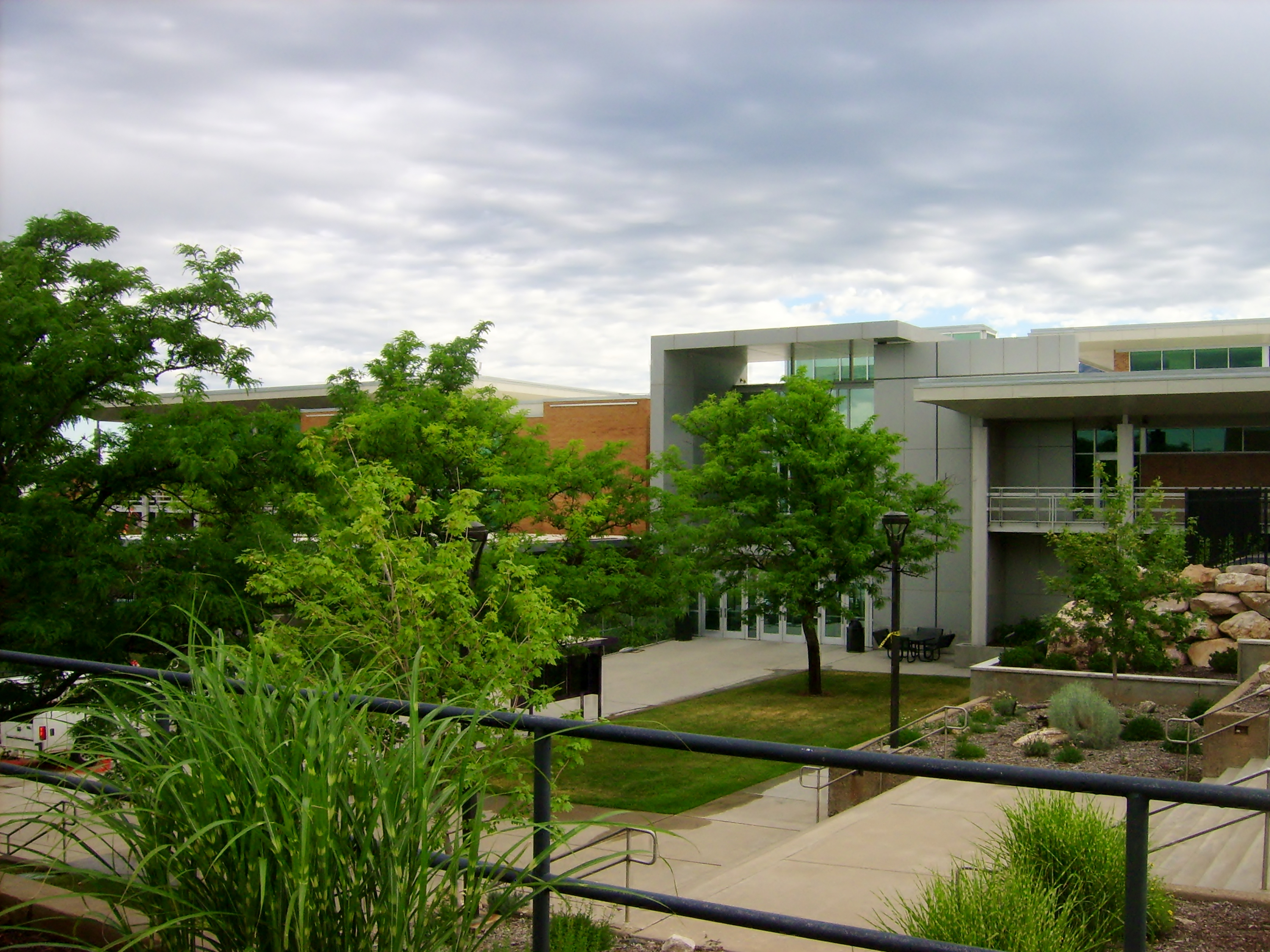
KWCR relocated to the Shepherd Union Building in 2008

In July 1996, after stunting, KWCR-FM returned to an alternative rock format. The station would adopt the moniker "The Edge" three years later. Another experiment with rap ended by 2001, when the station returned to an indie rock format geared toward commuting students. KWCR was also praised for its training environment and less rigidity compared to other college outlets, which often operated more like public radio stations.

2006 ushered in another major change of approach, as KWCR changed its name to "88.1 Weber FM" and adopted a rock-leaning adult contemporary format. The shift to a more mainstream sound was made, according to the general manager, to better meet the needs of students and faculty. In addition, an increase of airplay in female artists was designed to improve listenership among women. A major renovation of the Shepherd Union Building also saw KWCR displaced to the basement of the library. The new Shepherd Union studio, which opened in 2008, featured a glass-front studio, vastly improving the station's visibility on campus.

However, the early 2010s featured another signal challenge for KWCR-FM. The challenge came in the form of the demolition of Promontory Tower, which had housed the transmitter and antenna since 1991, in order to build the third phase of the Wildcat Village residence hall complex. The university had opted to demolish the 44-year-old facility due to increasing upkeep costs and the building not meeting modern seismic standards. With the station about to lose its transmitter site, Weber State had filed in 2010 to relocate the station to a new tower on Mount Ogden; despite obtaining FCC approval, a contract could not be secured to use the proposed site, and in April 2012, KWCR-FM filed for special temporary authority to use a tower in Riverdale with 200 watts, which was approved and extended through the end of KWCR-FM's broadcast run. Weber State then filed to build new, permanent facilities for KWCR-FM in 2014, but the FCC dismissed the original application and an amended version, as the interfering contour of the proposed installation would have created impermissible overlap with the 60 dBu contour of adjacent-channel KCPW-FM in Salt Lake City.

The station couldn’t find a suitable location so that led them to realize they might sell the license because they didn’t have a good place.

— John Kowalewski, spokesman, Weber State University, on factors motivating the 2017 sale of KWCR-FM to EMF

The inability to find a new and suitable facility that did not cause interference to KCPW-FM or other stations would be cited by the university as a factor in the end of KWCR-FM as a broadcast outlet and, ultimately, the sale of the license.

=== Transition to online ===
By 2015, KWCR had dropped the "Weber FM" name and returned to an independent rock-based sound at the start of its 50th year of broadcasting; while the station considered 2015 its 50th birthday, the station had gone on the air in 1966, not 1965. Features of KWCR in what would be its final year on FM also included its Spanish-language programming on Sundays, Domingos Latinos (Latin Sundays).

Later that year, however, KWCR management opted to become an online-only radio station, effective October 30. In an advisory to listeners on its Facebook, KWCR stated the change would allow it "to create higher quality programming for your listening experience". In addition, according to KWCR staff, leaving FM, and with it FCC regulations, would allow students to make mistakes and not incur potential legal action or fines from the commission. The station handed out promo CDs—the contents of which had already been stored on station computers—to its listeners after going digital only.

== Sale to Educational Media Foundation and move to Tremonton ==
The value of this [license] declines every day we wait, so we need to sell.

— Nolan Karras, Trustee, Weber State University

Weber State University (Note: Renamed from college to university effective January 1, 1991.) still owned the KWCR-FM license, which remained silent, with the exception of periodic broadcasts to keep the license active. On March 21, 2017, the university's trustees agreed to allow its sale.

On June 13, 2017, the Federal Communications Commission adopted a consent decree with Weber State that resolved issues related to violations of rules governing public inspection files, Emergency Alert System and station log issues raised during a review of KWCR's application for license renewal. Two people had charged that the station broadcast indecent lyrics, missed EAS tests, and violated underwriting rules for noncommercial stations. The university agreed to pay a civil penalty of $9,300. The FCC also required Weber State to sign a compliance plan, train station employees about license obligations, and conduct annual audits for three years, obligations that would be inherited by the station's buyer. The license renewal application was granted on July 12, 2017, upon tender of the civil penalty payment.

Shortly before agreeing to the consent decree, Weber State University filed an application with the Federal Communications Commission to sell the license to Educational Media Foundation for $100,000. Profits from the sale were put toward student scholarships. The application was granted on July 18, 2017.

As the sale was pending, EMF filed an application, with Weber State's permission, to co-locate the 88.1 MHz facility with its 88.7 MHz station, KNKL. The sale to EMF was consummated on August 15, 2017, at which point the station changed its call sign to KUAO. The FCC approved the site change application on October 4; the station resumed broadcasting on October 31, broadcasting EMF's Air 1 network.

On July 23, 2019, KUAO swapped call signs and networks with sister station KNKL; the newly-named KNKL began broadcasting EMF's contemporary Christian K-Love programming. The change in network coincided with the relocation of the 88.1 MHz facility from Ogden north to a new city of license, Tremonton, to serve Logan, which reduced overlap to EMF station KKLV covering metropolitan Salt Lake City.
