= Jean Lessard =

Canadian alpine skier (1932–2013)

Jean Lessard (5 August 1932 – 27 April 2013) was a Canadian alpine skier who competed in the 1960 Winter Olympics.
