= Mount Ogden =

Mountain in the American state of Utah

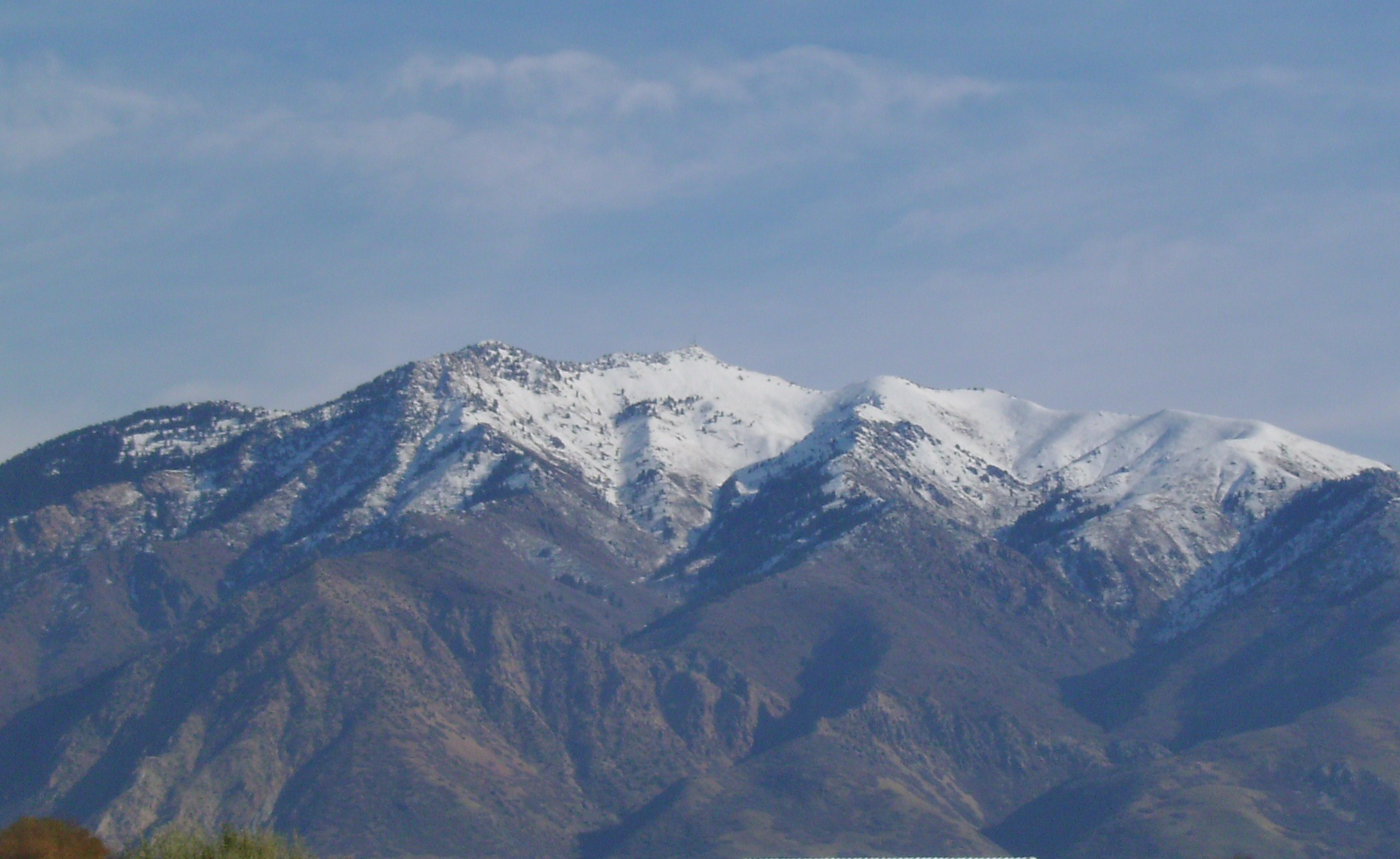
- Mt. Ogden from the west

Highest point
- Elevation: 9,579 ft (2,920 m) NAVD 88
- Prominence: 3,810 feet (1,161 m)
- Coordinates: 41°12′00″N 111°52′55″W

Geography
- Location within Utah
- Location: Weber County, Utah, U.S.
- Parent range: Wasatch Range
- Topo map: USGS Ogden

Mount Ogden is a peak in Weber County, Utah, United States in the northern Wasatch Range.

Mount Ogden has an elevation of 9,579 feet (2,920 m). The peak is popular with hikers and can be accessed via trails in three nearby canyons: Beus, Waterfall, and Taylor canyons. The summit's eastern face also has technical crack and face climbing routes. The summit accommodates several large radio towers and a helipad.

Mount Ogden's eastern slope is home to Snowbasin Ski Resort, where the 2002 Winter Olympics downhill ski races were held. The resort also provides private road access to the peak.

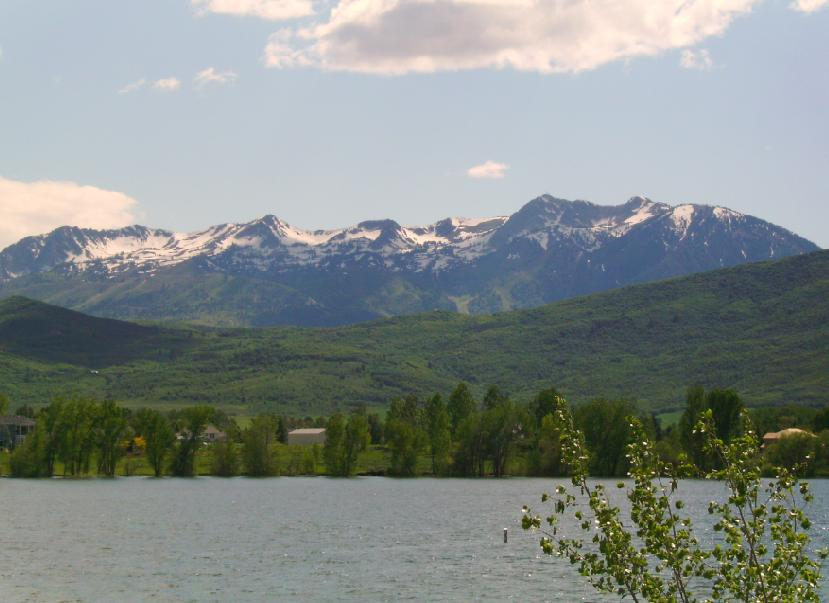
Mount Ogden from the east, with Pineview Reservoir in the foreground
