= Max Marolt =

American skier (1936–2003)

Personal information
- Nationality: American
- Born: April 16, 1936 Aspen, Colorado, U.S.
- Died: July 28, 2003 (aged 67) Mendoza, Argentina

Sport
- Sport: Alpine skiing

Max Marolt (April 16, 1936 – July 28, 2003) was an American alpine skier. He competed in two events at the 1960 Winter Olympics.

Born in 1936, Marolt was the second child of Bill and Celia Marolt and grew up in Aspen, Colorado. With his brothers Bill and Bud, he grew up skiing for the junior racing team in Aspen. He competed in the National Junior Meet in 1951, placing third. Marolt went on to attend the University of Denver.

In 1954, Marolt earned a spot on the United States Ski Team, and in 1960, competed in two alpine skiing events, giant slalom and downhill, at the 1960 Winter Olympics at Squaw Valley, California, placing 15th. He was the first person from Aspen to compete in the Olympics.

After retiring from competitive skiing, Marolt worked in sales for ski equipment companies and lived in Aspen. He continued skiing across the US and internationally. With the help of a helicopter, Marolt was the first person to ski down one of the peaks at Alyeska Resort, which subsequently came to bear his name as "Max's Mountain." In his community, Marolt served on the Pitkin Board of County Commissioners for five months in 1975, and was also on the Aspen City Council.

Marolt's brother Bill was a skier for the US Olympic team in 1964. Marolt died in 2003 after suffering a heart attack at Las Leñas ski resort in Mendoza, Argentina.
