= Takashi Takeda =

Japanese alpine skier (born 1940)

Personal information
- Nationality: Japanese
- Born: 20 February 1940 (age 86) Hokkaido, Japan

Sport
- Sport: Alpine skiing

Takashi Takeda (born 20 February 1940) is a Japanese alpine skier. He competed in two events at the 1960 Winter Olympics.
