= Dave Gorsuch =

American alpine skier (1938–2021)

Personal information
- Born: September 2, 1938 Climax, Colorado, United States
- Died: June 26, 2021 (aged 82) Vail, Colorado, United States

Sport
- Sport: Alpine skiing

Dave Gorsuch (September 22, 1938 – June 26, 2021) was an American alpine skier. He competed in two events at the 1960 Winter Olympics.
