= Fredy Brupbacher =

Swiss alpine skier (1934–2018)

Personal information
- Nationality: Swiss
- Born: 28 November 1934; Zürich, Switzerland
- Died: 9 April 2018 (aged 83)

Sport
- Sport: Alpine skiing

Fredy Brupbacher (28 November 1934 – 9 April 2018) was a Swiss alpine skier. He competed in the men's giant slalom at the 1960 Winter Olympics.
