= Clarence Servold =

Canadian cross-country skier (1927–2019)

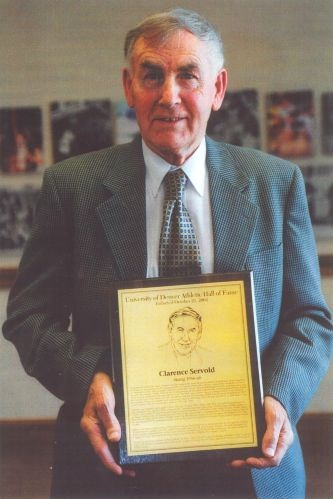
- Servold posed with his University of Denver Athletic Hall of Fame award

Personal information
- Born: 28 March 1927 Camrose, Alberta, Canada
- Died: 4 February 2019 (aged 91) Camrose, Alberta, Canada

Sport
- Country: Canada
- Sport: Cross-country skiing, Nordic combined
- Club: Camrose Ski Club

Clarence Lloyd Servold (28 March 1927 – 4 February 2019) was a Canadian cross-country skier who competed in the 1956 Winter Olympics and in the 1960 Winter Olympics. He was inducted into the Canadian Ski Hall of Fame in 1984.

== Biography ==
Clarence L. Servold was born on March 28, 1927, in Camrose, Alberta, Canada. A distinguished competitor, coach, and administrator, he was actively involved in the skiing community for 35 years at local, provincial, national, and international levels. His commitment to the sport was highlighted during the 1988 Winter Olympics in Calgary, where he was honored by the International Olympic Committee to light the Olympic flame at the Canmore Nordic Centre. His efforts were crucial to the success of the Nordic events at those Games.

Servold gained recognition in 1948 when he won the title of Canada’s Junior Nordic Combined Champion, which included both cross-country skiing and ski jumping. He represented Canada at the 1956 VII Olympic Winter Games in Cortina d’Ampezzo, Italy, finishing 19th in the 15 km Classic cross-country event—the highest finish for a North American that year. He received a second invitation to the 1960 VIII Olympic Winter Games in Squaw Valley, USA, where he competed in the 15 km and 30 km Classic events, as well as in Nordic Combined. However, he had to decline a spot on the 1964 team due to career commitments.

In 1956, he also began studying at the University of Denver in Colorado. He won the 1958 NCAA University Division cross country championships, finishing four minutes ahead of his nearest competitor, and was referred to as “…the best cross-country man in college history” by the Denver Post. He claimed the championship again in 1959 and held the U.S. 15 km Cross Country title for two consecutive years in 1959 and 1960. In 2004, he was inducted into the University of Denver’s Ski Hall of Fame.

Returning to Canada in 1960, he coached the Canadian Nordic Ski team at the World Ski Championships in Zakopane, Poland. The following year, he became the first Canadian appointed to the Cross-Country Committee by the Federation Internationale de Ski (FIS).

In 1964, he continued to compete successfully, finishing first at the Canadian Nordic Championships, and two years later, he coached the national team in Oslo, Norway.

As a professional engineer, Servold contributed to the development of various ski facilities, including the 1971 Canada Winter Games site at Blackstrap Provincial Park, where he helped design the mountain and its related facilities. He also consulted on the 1975 Canada Winter Games in Lethbridge, Alberta, and served as an official during the events.

Servold was involved in designing and updating ski jump facilities, ski lifts, and cross-country courses in British Columbia, Alberta, Saskatchewan, and Ontario. Additionally, he worked with the Canadian Ski Association and Sport Canada to establish a five-year plan to boost the performance potential of Nordic Combined athletes.

== Personal life ==
Clarence's brother, Irvin Servold, is also a former Canadian cross-country skier.
