= Im Gyeong-sun =

South Korean alpine skier (born 1929)

Personal information
- Nationality: South Korean
- Born: 1929 (age 96–97)

Sport
- Sport: Alpine skiing

Im Gyeong-sun (born 1929) is a South Korean alpine skier. He competed in three events at the 1960 Winter Olympics.
