= Clemente Tellechea =

Argentine alpine skier (born 1932)

Personal information
- Nationality: Argentine
- Born: 23 November 1932 (age 93)

Sport
- Sport: Alpine skiing

Clemente Tellechea (born 23 November 1932) is an Argentine alpine skier. He competed in three events at the 1960 Winter Olympics.
