= Donald Bruneski =

Canadian alpine skier (1937–2024)

Don Bruneski
Personal information
- Nationality: Canadian
- Born: March 10, 1937 Rossland, British Columbia, Canada
- Died: April 6, 2024 (aged 87)

Sport
- Sport: Alpine skiing

Donald Bruneski (March 10, 1937 – April 6, 2024) was a Canadian alpine skier who competed in the 1960 Winter Olympics.
