= Geoff Pitchford =

British alpine skier

Personal information
- Nationality: British
- Born: 13 August 1936 Brahmapur, Orissa, British India
- Died: 28 May 2021 (aged 84)

Sport
- Sport: Alpine skiing

Geoff Pitchford (13 August 1936 – 28 May 2021) was a British alpine skier. He competed in three events at the 1960 Winter Olympics.
