= Nando Pajarola =

Swiss alpine skier (1935–2005)

Personal information
- Nationality: Swiss
- Born: 27 February 1935; Klosters, Switzerland
- Died: 21 February 2005 (aged 69); Switzerland

Sport
- Sport: Alpine skiing

Nando Pajarola (27 February 1935 – 21 February 2005) was a Swiss alpine skier. He competed in two events at the 1960 Winter Olympics.
