= Osvaldo Ancinas =

Argentine alpine skier (born 1934)

Personal information
- Born: 26 March 1934 (age 91); Península San Pedro, Argentina

Sport
- Sport: Alpine skiing

Osvaldo Ancinas (born 26 March 1934) is an Argentine alpine skier. He competed at the 1960 Winter Olympics and the 1964 Winter Olympics.
