= Francisco Cortes (alpine skier) =

Chilean alpine skier (born 1940)

Personal information
- Born: 6 December 1940 (age 84) Santiago, Chile

Sport
- Sport: Alpine skiing

Francisco Cortes (born 6 December 1940) is a Chilean alpine skier. He competed at the 1960 Winter Olympics and the 1964 Winter Olympics.
