= Jóhann Vilbergsson =

Icelandic alpine skier

Personal information
- Nationality: Icelandic
- Born: 20 May 1935 (age 91) Siglufjörður, Iceland

Sport
- Sport: Alpine skiing

Jóhann Vilbergsson (born 20 May 1935) is an Icelandic alpine skier. He competed at the 1960 Winter Olympics and the 1964 Winter Olympics.
