= Vicente Vera =

Chilean alpine skier (born 1936)

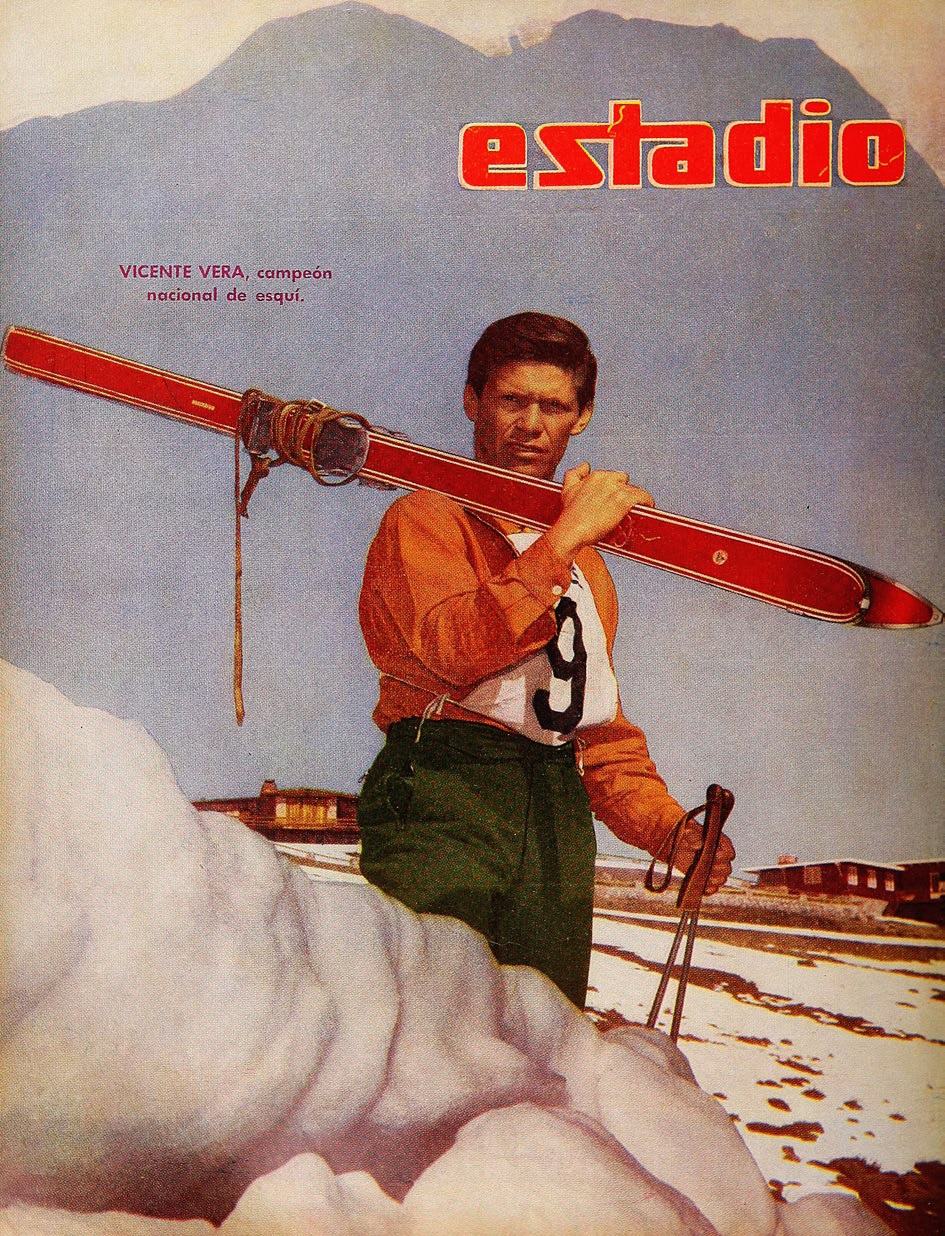
- Vera on the cover of Estadio in 1959

Personal information
- Nationality: Chilean
- Born: 10 May 1936 (age 89)

Sport
- Sport: Alpine skiing

Vicente Vera (born 10 May 1936) is a Chilean alpine skier. He competed at the 1956, 1960 and the 1964 Winter Olympics.
