= Osamu Tada =

Japanese alpine skier (born 1935)

Personal information
- Nationality: Japanese
- Born: 16 May 1935 (age 91) Hokkaido, Japan

Sport
- Sport: Alpine skiing

Osamu Tada (多田 修, Tada Osamu; born 16 May 1935) is a Japanese alpine skier. He competed in three events at the 1960 Winter Olympics.
