= Hernán Boher =

Chilean alpine skier (born 1940)

Personal information
- Born: 12 June 1940 (age 86) Santiago, Chile

Sport
- Sport: Alpine skiing

Hernán Boher (born 12 June 1940) is a Chilean alpine skier. He competed at the 1960 Winter Olympics and the 1964 Winter Olympics.
