= Masayoshi Mitani =

Japanese alpine skier

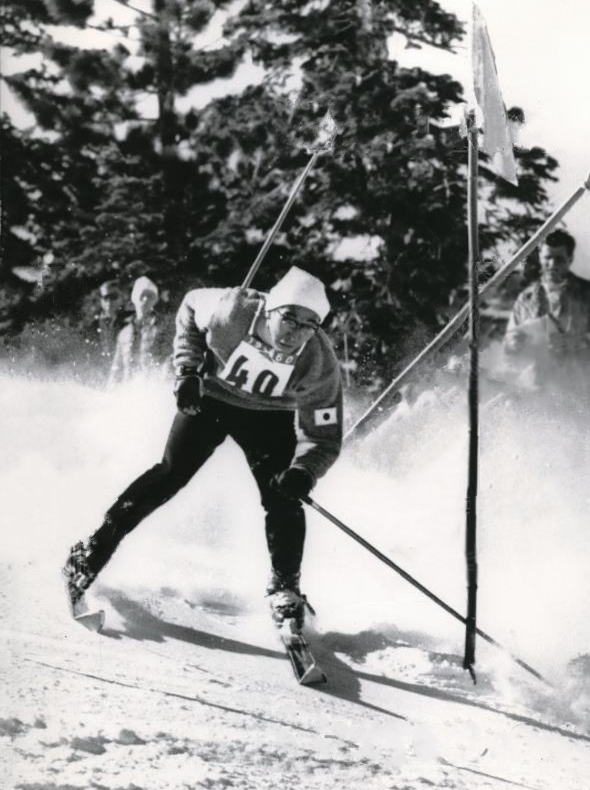
- Mitani at the 1960 Olympics

Personal information
- Born: January 5, 1938 (age 88)
- Height: 169 cm (5 ft 7 in)
- Weight: 60 kg (132 lb)

Sport
- Sport: Alpine skiing
- Club: Waseda University

Masayoshi Mitani (見谷 昌禧, born January 5, 1938) is a retired Japanese alpine skier. He competed in the downhill, slalom and giant slalom events at the 1960 Winter Olympics with the best result of 33rd place in the giant slalom. While preparing for the 1964 Winter Olympics, Mitani suffered a serious head injury, which left him bedridden for 3 months and forced him to retire from competitions.

After graduating from Waseda University, Mitani joined Tokyu Corporation and was transferred to the affiliated Hakuba Tourism Development. He then returned to Waseda University to work as a skiing coach and researcher. In 1969 he became head coach of the national alpine skiing team, and prepared it to the 1972 Winter Olympics in Sapporo. After the Olympics, he worked at a ski school and provided commentaries and reports on major international skiing competitions.
