= Oddvar Rønnestad =

Norwegian alpine skier (1935–2014)

Oddvar Rønnestad (4 November 1935 – 21 March 2014) was a Norwegian alpine skier. He participated at the 1960 Winter Olympics in Squaw Valley, where he competed in downhill, slalom and giant slalom. He became Norwegian champion in downhill in 1962.
