= Silvan Kindle =

Liechtenstein alpine skier (1936–2025)

Silvan Kindle (10 July 1936 – 28 December 2025) was a Liechtensteiner alpine skier who competed in the 1960 Winter Olympics.

Kindle died after a short serious illness on 28 December 2025, at the age of 89.
