= Bruno Alberti =

Italian alpine skier (born 1934)

Personal information
- Born: 23 May 1934 (age 92) Cortina d'Ampezzo, Italy

Skiing career
- Sport: Alpine skiing

Bruno Alberti (born 23 May 1934) is an Italian former alpine skier. He competed at the 1960 Winter Olympics and the 1964 Winter Olympics. Alberti was the flag bearer for Italy in the opening ceremony of the 1960 Winter Games.

Winter Olympics
Preceded by Tito Tolin	Flag bearer for Italy; Squaw Valley 1960	Succeeded by Eugenio Monti
