= Georgi Dimitrov (alpine skier) =

Bulgarian alpine skier (1930–2024)

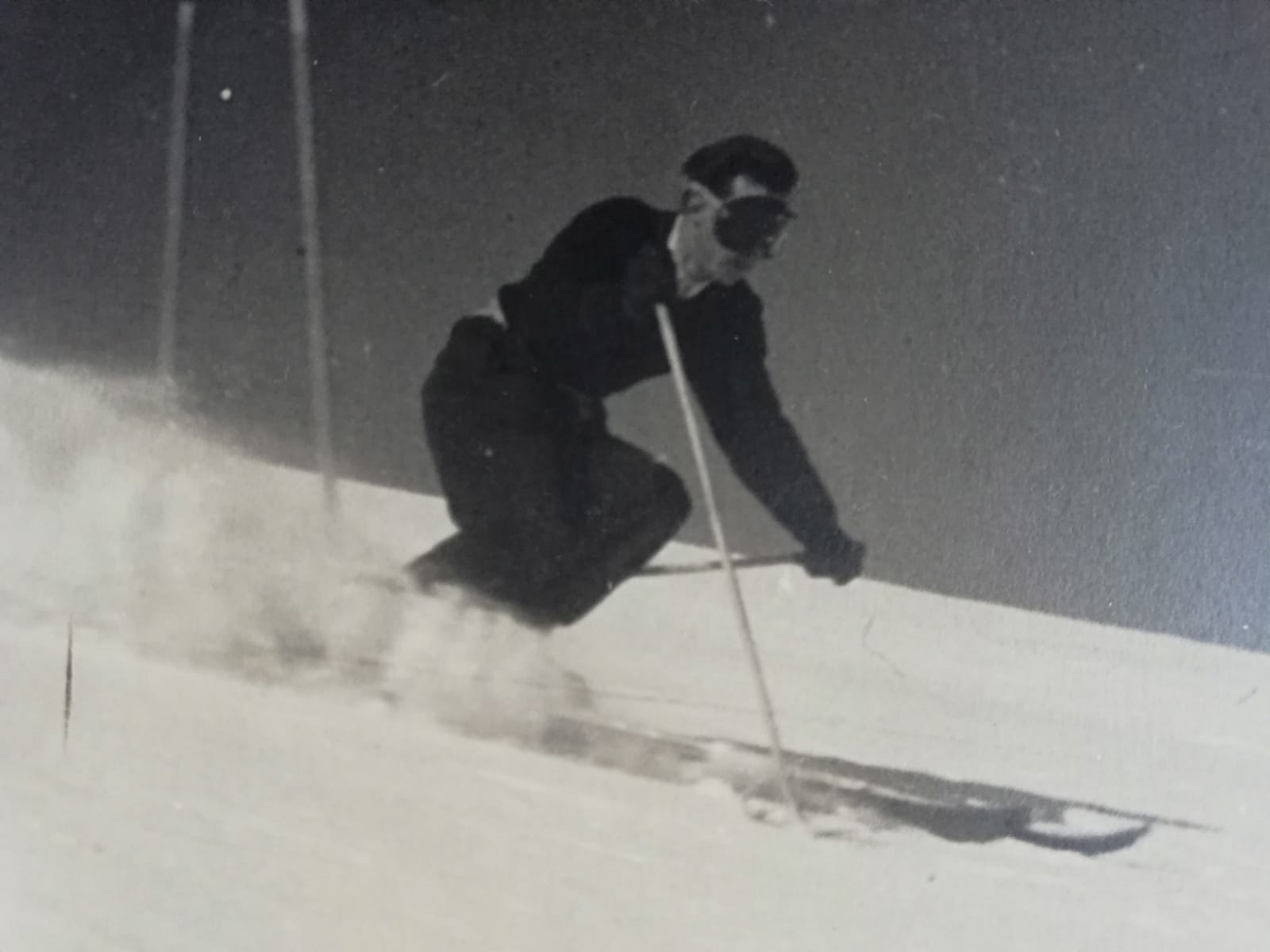
- 10.06.1953

Personal information
- Full name: Georgi K. Dimitrov
- Nationality: Bulgarian
- Born: 10 April 1930 Samokov, Bulgaria
- Died: 5 September 2024 (aged 94)

Sport
- Sport: Alpine skiing

Georgi K. Dimitrov (Bulgarian: Георги Димитров, 10 April 1930 – 5 September 2024) was a Bulgarian alpine skier. He competed at the 1952, 1956 and the 1960 Winter Olympics.

Dimitrov died on 5 September 2024, at the age of 94.
