= Manuel García-Moran =

Spanish skier (born 1935)

Personal information
- Full name: Manuel García-Moran Lopéz
- Nationality: Spanish
- Born: 17 February 1935 (age 91) Asturias, Spain

Sport
- Sport: Alpine skiing

Manuel García-Moran Lopéz (born 17 February 1935) is a Spanish alpine skier. He competed in three events at the 1960 Winter Olympics.
