= Adolf Fehr (alpine skier) =

Liechtenstein alpine skier (1940–2022)

Adolf Fehr (23 October 1940 – 29 June 2022) was an alpine skier from Liechtenstein who competed in the 1960 Winter Olympics.
