= Georgi Varoshkin =

Bulgarian alpine skier (1932–2017)

Personal information
- Nationality: Bulgarian
- Born: 20 December 1932
- Died: 20 September 2017 (aged 84)

Sport
- Sport: Alpine skiing

Georgi Varoshkin (Bulgarian: Георги Варошкин, 20 December 1932 – 20 September 2017) was a Bulgarian alpine skier. He competed at the 1956 Winter Olympics and the 1960 Winter Olympics. He was an associate professor at the National Sports Academy "Vasil Levski".
