= Frederick Tommy =

Canadian alpine skier (1941–2004)

Frederick Tommy (24 September 1941 – 3 February 2004) was a Canadian alpine skier who competed in the 1960 Winter Olympics.
