= Luis Arias (alpine skier) =

Spanish alpine skier (1930–1970)

Personal information
- Nationality: Spanish
- Born: 3 September 1930 Madrid, Spain
- Died: 23 April 1970 (aged 39) Isaba, Spain

Sport
- Sport: Alpine skiing

Luis Arias (3 September 1930 – 23 April 1970) was a Spanish alpine skier. He competed at the 1952, 1956 and the 1960 Winter Olympics. Arias was the flag bearer for Spain in the opening ceremony of the 1956 Winter Olympics.

Arias died on 23 April 1970 in a helicopter crash in Isaba, Navarre.
