= Adrien Duvillard (alpine skier born 1934) =

French alpine skier (1934–2017)

Adrien Duvillard (7 November 1934, Megève – 14 February 2017) was a French alpine skier who competed in the 1956 Winter Olympics and 1960 Winter Olympics.

His son Adrien and his brother Henri Duvillard were also successful skiers.

At the 1956 Winter Olympics he finished 4th in the Giant Slalom, earning France's best result at those games.
