= Speed skating at the 1964 Winter Olympics – Women's 500 metres =

Women's 500 metres speed skating at the IX Olympic Winter Games
- Pictogram for speed skating
- Venue: Eisschnelllaufbahn Innsbruck
- Date: 30 January 1964
- Competitors: 28 from 13 nations
- Winning time: 45.0 OR

Medalists
1st place, gold medalist(s)		Lidiya Skoblikova	Soviet Union
2nd place, silver medalist(s)		Irina Yegorova	Soviet Union
3rd place, bronze medalist(s)		Tatyana Sidorova	Soviet Union

The women's 500 metres in speed skating at the 1964 Winter Olympics took place on 30 January, at the Eisschnellaufbahn.

== Records ==
Prior to this competition, the existing world and Olympic records were as follows:

World record	Inga Artamonova (URS)	44.9	Alma-Ata, Kazakh SSR, Soviet Union	27 January 1962
Olympic record	Helga Haase (EUA)	45.9	Squaw Valley, United States	20 February 1960

The following new Olympic record was set.

Date	Athlete	Time	OR	WR
30 January	Lidiya Skoblikova (URS)	45.0	OR	

== Results ==
Rank	Athlete	Country	Time	Notes
1st place, gold medalist(s)	Lidiya Skoblikova	Soviet Union	45.0	OR
2nd place, silver medalist(s)	Irina Yegorova	Soviet Union	45.4	
3rd place, bronze medalist(s)	Tatyana Sidorova	Soviet Union	45.5	
4	Jeanne Ashworth	United States	46.2	
4	Jan Smith	United States	46.2	
6	Gunilla Jacobsson	Sweden	46.5	
7	Mary Lawler	United States	46.6	
8	Helga Haase	United Team of Germany	47.2	
9	Inger Eriksson	Sweden	47.3	
10	Doreen Ryan	Canada	47.7	
11	Christina Lindblom-Scherling	Sweden	47.8	
12	Hatsue Nagakubo-Takamizawa	Japan	47.9	
13	Doreen McCannell	Canada	48.0	
13	Kaija Mustonen	Finland	48.0	
15	Ryoo Choon-za	North Korea	48.4	
16	Kaija-Liisa Keskivitikka	Finland	48.8	
16	Elwira Seroczyńska	Poland	48.8	
18	Françoise Lucas	France	48.9	
19	Yasuko Takano	Japan	49.3	
20	Kim Hye-suk	South Korea	49.6	
21	Brigitte Reichert	United Team of Germany	49.8	
22	Adelajda Mroske	Poland	49.9	
23	Helena Pilejczyk	Poland	50.1	
24	Kaneko Takahashi	Japan	50.5	
25	Sigrit Behrenz	United Team of Germany	50.9	
25	Kornélia Ihász	Hungary	50.9	
27	Jarmila Šťastná	Czechoslovakia	52.0	
28	Han Pil-Hwa	North Korea	58.5	
