= Speed skating at the 1964 Winter Olympics – Women's 1000 metres =

Women's 1000 metres speed skating at the IX Olympic Winter Games
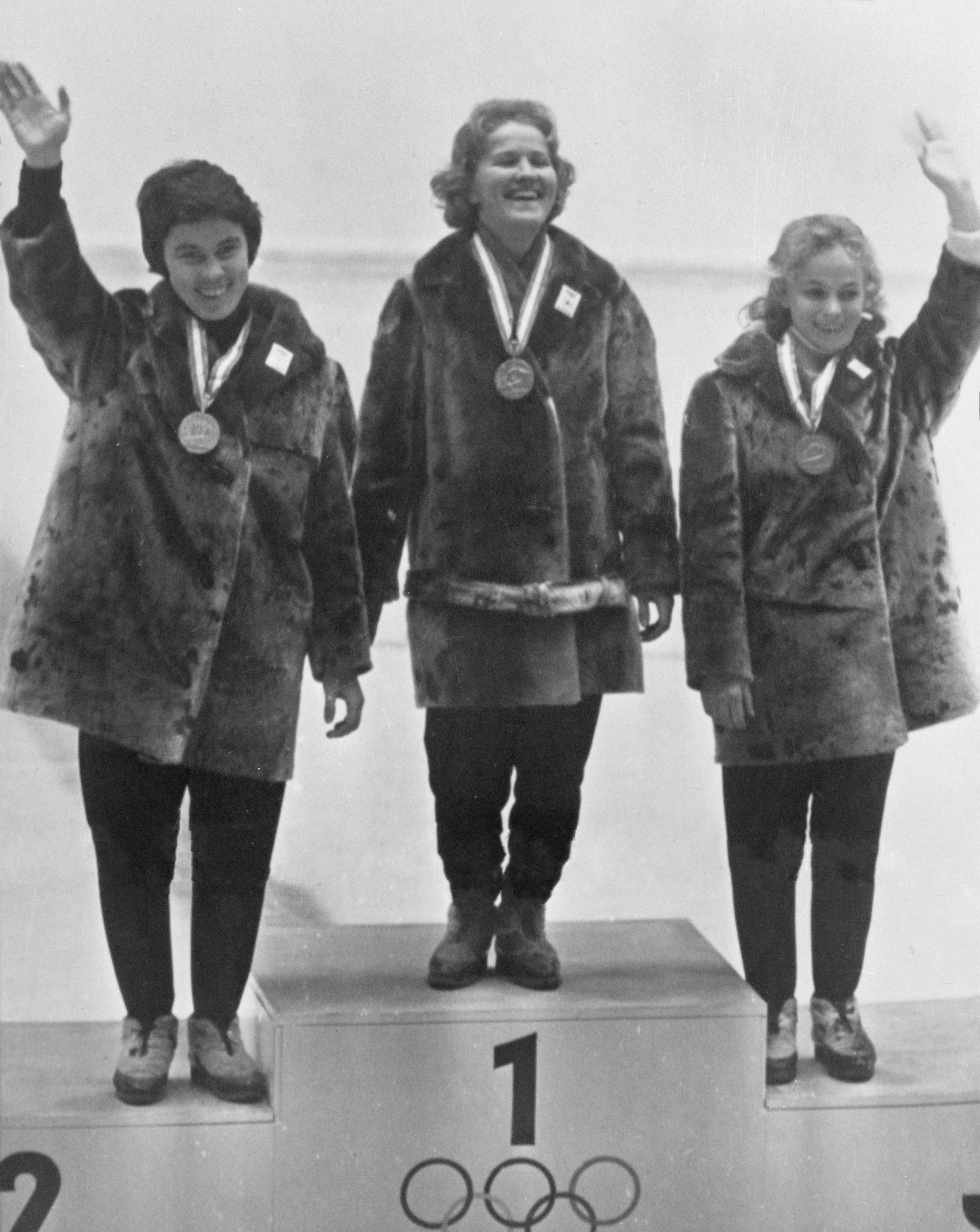
- Left-right: Irina Yegorova, Lidiya Skoblikova, Kaija Mustonen
- Venue: Eisschnelllaufbahn Innsbruck
- Date: 1 February 1964
- Competitors: 28 from 14 nations
- Winning time: 1:33.2 OR

Medalists
1st place, gold medalist(s)		Lidiya Skoblikova	Soviet Union
2nd place, silver medalist(s)		Irina Yegorova	Soviet Union
3rd place, bronze medalist(s)		Kaija Mustonen	Finland

The women's 1000 metres in speed skating at the 1964 Winter Olympics took place on 1 February, at the Eisschnellaufbahn.

== Records ==
Prior to this competition, the existing world and Olympic records were as follows:

World record	Lidia Skoblikova (URS)	1:31.8	Karuizawa, Japan	22 February 1963
Olympic record	Klara Guseva (URS)	1:34.1	Squaw Valley, United States	22 February 1960

The following new Olympic record was set.

Date	Athlete	Time	OR	WR
1 February	Lidia Skoblikova (URS)	1:33.2	OR	

== Results ==
Rank	Athlete	Country	Time	Notes
1st place, gold medalist(s)	Lidiya Skoblikova	Soviet Union	1:33.2	OR
2nd place, silver medalist(s)	Irina Yegorova	Soviet Union	1:34.3	
3rd place, bronze medalist(s)	Kaija Mustonen	Finland	1:34.8	
4	Helga Haase	United Team of Germany	1:35.7	
5	Valentina Stenina	Soviet Union	1:36.0	
6	Gunilla Jacobsson	Sweden	1:36.5	
7	Jan Smith	United States	1:36.7	
8	Kaija-Liisa Keskivitikka	Finland	1:37.6	
9	Inger Eriksson	Sweden	1:37.8	
10	Barb Lockhart	United States	1:38.6	
11	Jeanne Ashworth	United States	1:38.7	
11	Doreen Ryan	Canada	1:38.7	
13	Doreen McCannell	Canada	1:39.4	
14	Christina Lindblom-Scherling	Sweden	1:39.5	
15	Helena Pilejczyk	Poland	1:39.8	
16	Ryoo Choon-Za	North Korea	1:40.0	
17	Willy de Beer	Netherlands	1:40.1	
18	Kaneko Takahashi	Japan	1:40.5	
19	Françoise Lucas	France	1:41.3	
20	Yasuko Takano	Japan	1:41.6	
21	Adelajda Mroske	Poland	1:41.7	
22	Elwira Seroczyńska	Poland	1:42.1	
23	Erika Heinicke	United Team of Germany	1:43.2	
24	Tsedenjavyn Lkhamjav	Mongolia	1:43.5	
25	Brigitte Reichert	United Team of Germany	1:44.9	
26	Kim Hye-Suk	South Korea	1:45.1	
27	Jarmila Šťastná	Czechoslovakia	1:45.8	
-	Hatsue Nagakubo-Takamizawa	Japan	DNF	
