= Speed skating at the 1964 Winter Olympics – Women's 1500 metres =

Women's 1500 metres speed skating at the IX Olympic Winter Games
- Pictogram for speed skating
- Venue: Eisschnelllaufbahn Innsbruck
- Date: 31 January 1964
- Competitors: 30 from 14 nations
- Winning time: 2:22.6 OR

Medalists
1st place, gold medalist(s)		Lidiya Skoblikova	Soviet Union
2nd place, silver medalist(s)		Kaija Mustonen	Finland
3rd place, bronze medalist(s)		Berta Kolokoltseva	Soviet Union

The women's 1500 metres in speed skating at the 1964 Winter Olympics took place on January 31, at the Eisschnellaufbahn.

== Records ==
Prior to this competition, the existing world and Olympic records were as follows:

World record	Inga Artamonova (URS)	2:19.0	Alma-Ata, Kazakh SSR, Soviet Union	27 January 1962
Olympic record	Lidia Skoblikova (URS)	2:25.2	Squaw Valley, United States	21 February 1960

The following new Olympic record was set.

Date	Athlete	Time	OR	WR
31 January	Lidia Skoblikova (URS)	2:22.6	OR	

== Results ==
Rank	Athlete	Country	Time	Notes
1st place, gold medalist(s)	Lidiya Skoblikova	Soviet Union	2:22.6	OR
2nd place, silver medalist(s)	Kaija Mustonen	Finland	2:25.5	
3rd place, bronze medalist(s)	Berta Kolokoltseva	Soviet Union	2:27.1	
4	Kim Song-soon	North Korea	2:27.7	
5	Helga Haase	United Team of Germany	2:28.6	
6	Christina Lindblom-Scherling	Sweden	2:29.4	
7	Valentina Stenina	Soviet Union	2:29.9	
8	Kaija-Liisa Keskivitikka	Finland	2:30.0	
9	Han Pil-Hwa	North Korea	2:30.1	
10	Hatsue Nagakubo-Takamizawa	Japan	2:30.9	
11	Gunilla Jacobsson	Sweden	2:31.9	
12	Inger Eriksson	Sweden	2:32.0	
13	Doreen McCannell	Canada	2:32.7	
14	Yasuko Takano	Japan	2:33.1	
15	Judy Morstein	United States	2:33.3	
16	Willy de Beer	Netherlands	2:34.0	
16	Doreen Ryan	Canada	2:34.0	
18	Kaneko Takahashi	Japan	2:34.6	
19	Mary Lawler	United States	2:34.9	
20	Kornélia Ihász	Hungary	2:35.1	
21	Inge Lieckfeldt	United Team of Germany	2:36.2	
22	Françoise Lucas	France	2:36.4	
22	Adelajda Mroske	Poland	2:36.4	
24	Jan Smith	United States	2:37.8	
25	Helena Pilejczyk	Poland	2:38.3	
26	Elwira Seroczyńska	Poland	2:39.3	
27	Kim Gwi-jin	South Korea	2:39.7	
28	Erika Heinicke	United Team of Germany	2:40.4	
29	Jarmila Šťastná	Czechoslovakia	2:42.9	
30	An Sen-za	North Korea	2:44.7	
