= United States at the 1964 Winter Olympics =

- Flag of the United States
- IOC code: USA
- NOC: United States Olympic Committee

in Innsbruck
- Competitors: 89 (71 men, 18 women) in 6 sports
- Flag bearer: Bill Disney (speed skating)
- Medals Ranked 8th: Gold 1 Silver 2 Bronze 4 Total 7

Winter Olympics appearances (overview)
- 1924; 1928; 1932; 1936; 1948; 1952; 1956; 1960; 1964; 1968; 1972; 1976; 1980; 1984; 1988; 1992; 1994; 1998; 2002; 2006; 2010; 2014; 2018; 2022; 2026

The United States competed at the 1964 Winter Olympics in Innsbruck, Austria.

== Medalists ==
The following U.S. competitors won medals at the games. In the by discipline sections below, medalists' names are bolded.

Medal	Name	Sport	Event	Date
Gold	Terry McDermott	Speed skating	Men's 500 metres	February 4
Silver	Jean Saubert	Alpine skiing	Women's giant slalom	February 3
Silver	Billy Kidd	Alpine skiing	Men's slalom	February 8
Bronze	Ronald Joseph; Vivian Joseph	Figure skating	Pairs	January 29
Bronze	Jean Saubert	Alpine skiing	Women's slalom	February 1
Bronze	Scott Allen	Figure skating	Men's singles	February 6
Bronze	James Heuga	Alpine skiing	Men's slalom	February 8

Medals by gender
Gender	1st place, gold medalist(s)	2nd place, silver medalist(s)	3rd place, bronze medalist(s)	Total	Percentage
Male	1	1	2	**4**	57.1%
Female	0	1	1	**2**	28.6%
Mixed	0	0	1	**1**	14.3%
Total	1	2	4	7	100%

Multiple medalists
Name	Sport	1st place, gold medalist(s)	2nd place, silver medalist(s)	3rd place, bronze medalist(s)	Total
Jean Saubert	Alpine skiing	0	1	1	**2**

== Alpine skiing ==
Men

Athlete	Event	Qualifying				Final					
Athlete	Event	Run 1		Run 2		Run 1		Run 2		Total	
Athlete	Event	Time	Rank	Time	Rank	Time	Rank	Time	Rank	Time	Rank
Chuck Ferries	Downhill	—N/a								2:23.00	20
Billy Kidd	Downhill	—N/a								2:21.82	16
Ni Orsi	Downhill	—N/a								2:21.59	14
Buddy Werner	Downhill	—N/a								2:22.05	17
Jimmy Heuga	Giant slalom	—N/a								DSQ	
Billy Kidd	Giant slalom	—N/a								1:49.97	7
Bill Marolt	Giant slalom	—N/a								1:51.29	12
Buddy Werner	Giant slalom	—N/a								DSQ	
Chuck Ferries	Slalom	55.17	25 QF	Bye		DSQ					
Jimmy Heuga	Slalom	52.45	4 QF	Bye		1:10.16	3	1:01.36	3	2:11.52	3rd place, bronze medalist(s)
Billy Kidd	Slalom	53.73	11 QF	Bye		1:10.96	6	1:00.31	2	2:11.27	2nd place, silver medalist(s)
Buddy Werner	Slalom	53.19	5 QF	Bye		1:11.64	9	1:01.82	6	2:13.46	8

Women

Athlete	Event	Run 1		Run 2		Total	
Athlete	Event	Time	Rank	Time	Rank	Time	Rank
Joan Hannah	Downhill	—N/a				2:01.88	15
Jean Saubert	Downhill	—N/a				2:03.79	26
Margo Walters	Downhill	—N/a				2:02.68	21
Starr Walton	Downhill	—N/a				2:01.45	14
Barbara Ferries	Giant slalom	—N/a				1:59.44	20
Joan Hannah	Giant slalom	—N/a				2:01.97	26
Linda Meyers	Giant slalom	—N/a				2:03.46	30
Jean Saubert	Giant slalom	—N/a				1:53.11	2nd place, silver medalist(s)
Barbara Ferries	Slalom	DSQ					
Joan Hannah	Slalom	51.36	22	56.03	22	1:47.39	19
Linda Meyers	Slalom	47.02	12	50.91	12	1:37.93	12
Jean Saubert	Slalom	44.78	6	46.58	2	1:31.36	3rd place, bronze medalist(s)

== Biathlon ==
Athlete	Event	Time	Misses	Rank
Charlie Akers	Individual	1:32:24.9	2 (1+0+1+0)	16
Peter Lahdenpera	Individual	1:43:04.7	8 (0+3+3+2)	36
Paul Renne	Individual	1:46:45.9	6 (3+1+1+1)	39
Bill Spencer	Individual	1:36:49.8	4 (3+0+0+1)	30

== Bobsleigh ==
Athletes	Event	Run 1		Run 2		Run 3		Run 4		Total	
Athletes	Event	Time	Rank	Time	Rank	Time	Rank	Time	Rank	Time	Rank
Charlie McDonald; Chuck Pandolph	Two-man	1:05.97	6	1:05.85	4	1:06.16	7	1:07.02	9	4:25.00	7
Larry McKillip; Jim Lamy	Two-man	1:06.17	7	1:06.34	7	1:05.84	5	1:06.25	4	4:24.60	5
Bill Hickey; Reg Benham; Bill Dundon; Chuck Pandolph	Four-man	1:03.90	4	1:04.11	7	1:04.43	6	1:04.79	11	4:17.23	6
Larry McKillip; Neil Rogers; Mike Baumgartner; Jim Lamy	Four-man	1:03.92	5	1:04.22	8	DNF					

== Cross-country skiing ==
Athlete	Event	Time	Rank
Karl Bohlin	Men's 15 km	57:54.0	47
Mike Elliott	Men's 15 km	56:51.8	41
Mike Gallagher	Men's 15 km	56:19.4	38
Dick Taylor	Men's 15 km	58:19.6	49
Larry Damon	Men's 30 km	1:42:57.7	46
Mike Elliott	Men's 30 km	1:40:11.7	30
Jim Shea	Men's 30 km	1:43:18.4	48
Dick Taylor	Men's 30 km	1:42:39.5	42
Larry Damon	Men's 50 km	3:05:06.4	28
Dick Taylor	Men's 50 km	3:09:58.3	34
John Bower; Mike Elliott; Mike Gallagher; Jim Shea	Men's 4 × 10 km relay	2:39:17.3	13

== Figure skating ==
On February 15, 1961, the entire United States figure skating team and several family members, coaches, and officials were killed when Sabena Flight 548 crashed in Brussels, Belgium, en route to the World Championships in Prague. The accident caused the cancellation of the 1961 World Championships and necessitated the building of a new American skating program. Although American figure skaters were still too young in 1964 (most were aged 15 or lower), they still managed to win two medals.

Individual

Athlete	Event	CF	FS	Total		
Athlete	Event	Rank	Rank	Points	Places	Rank
Scott Allen	Men's singles	4	4	1873.6	26	3rd place, bronze medalist(s)
Monty Hoyt	Men's singles	6	12	1755.5	81	10
Thomas Litz	Men's singles	13	2	1764.7	77	6
Peggy Fleming	Ladies' singles	8	6	1819.6	59	6
Christine Haigler	Ladies' singles	6	15	1803.8	74	7
Albertina Noyes	Ladies' singles	9	7	1798.9	73	8

Pairs

Athlete	Event	Points	Places	Rank
Judianne Fotheringill; Jerry Fotheringill	Pairs	94.7	69.5	7
Cynthia Kauffman; Ronald Kauffman	Pairs	92.8	74	8
Vivian Joseph; Ronald Joseph	Pairs	89.2	35.5	3rd place, bronze medalist(s)

== Ice hockey ==
Summary

Team	Event	First round	Medal round							
Team	Event	Opposition Score	Opposition Score	Opposition Score	Opposition Score	Opposition Score	Opposition Score	Opposition Score	Opposition Score	Rank
United States men	Men's tournament	Romania; **W** 7–2	Soviet Union; **L** 1–5	Germany; **W** 8–0	Sweden; **L** 4–7	Canada; **L** 6–8	Czechoslovakia; **L** 1–7	Finland; **L** 2–3	Switzerland; **W** 7–3	5

Roster

Dan Dilworth
Dates Fryberger
David Brooks
Don Ross
Bill Reichart
Gary Schmalzbauer
Herb Brooks
Jim Westby
Pat Rupp
Paul Coppo
Paul Johnson
Rog Christian
Tom McCoy
Red Martin
Tom Yurkovich
Wayne Meredith
Billy Christian

First Round
Winners (in bold) qualified for the Group A to play for 1st-8th places. Teams, which lost their qualification matches, played in Group B for 9th-16th places.

Team 1	Score	Team 2
**United States**	7–2	Romania

Medal Round
First place team wins gold, second silver and third bronze.

Rank	Team	Pld	W	L	T	GF	GA	Pts
1	Soviet Union	7	7	0	0	54	10	14
2	Sweden	7	5	2	0	47	16	10
3	Czechoslovakia	7	5	2	0	38	19	10
4	Canada	7	5	2	0	32	17	10
5	United States	7	2	5	0	29	33	4
6	Finland	7	2	5	0	10	31	4
7	Germany	7	2	5	0	13	49	4
8	Switzerland	7	0	7	0	9	57	0

- USSR 5-1 USA
- USA 8-0 Germany (UTG)
- Sweden 7-4 USA
- Canada 8-6 USA
- Czechoslovakia 7-1 USA
- Finland 3-2 USA
- USA 7-3 Switzerland

== Luge ==
Athlete	Event	Run 1		Run 2		Run 3		Run 4		Total	
Athlete	Event	Time	Rank	Time	Rank	Time	Rank	Time	Rank	Time	Rank
George Farmer	Men's singles	56.78	25	1:26.81	31	57.00	24	56.01	23	4:16.60	29
Francis Feltman	Men's singles	52.91	7	53.43	13	54.13	14	54.58	15	3:35.05	13
Mike Hessel	Men's singles	55.31	20	55.50	22	56.12	23	56.37	24	3:43.30	22
Tom Neely	Men's singles	54.62	17	55.40	20	55.04	20	55.12	17	3:40.18	17
Ray Fales; Nicholas Mastromatteo	Doubles	1:00.75	13	1:11.18	12	—N/a				2:11.93	13
Jim Higgins; Ron Walters	Doubles	DNF				—N/a				DNF	

== Nordic combined ==
Athlete	Event	Ski Jumping				Cross-country			Total	
Athlete	Event	Jump 1	Jump 2	Total	Rank	Time	Points	Rank	Points	Rank
John Bower	Individual	90.9	100.2	191.1	21	52:26.4	212.66	9	403.76	15
Jim Page	Individual	80.1	72.2	152.3	30	DNF				
Jim Shea	Individual	72.1	69.2	141.3	31	53:04.2	205.46	13	346.76	27

== Ski jumping ==
Athlete	Event	Jump 1		Jump 2		Total	
Athlete	Event	Distance	Points	Distance	Points	Points	Rank
John Balfanz	Normal hill	74.5	103.9	74.5	102.6	206.5	10
David Hicks	Normal hill	72.0	95.4	71.5	94.9	190.3	41
Gene Kotlarek	Normal hill	76.5	103.2	74.0	100.2	203.4	14
Ansten Samuelstuen	Normal hill	72.5	100.1	73.0	100.3	200.4	24
John Balfanz	Large hill	83.0	94.8	71.0	85.4	180.2	41
David Hicks	Large hill	85.0	98.9	79.0	96.4	195.3	29
Gene Kotlarek	Large hill	87.0	100.1	79.0	97.4	197.5	24
Ansten Samuelstuen	Large hill	81.5	93.0	80.5	96.0	189.0	33

== Speed skating ==
Men

Athlete	Event	Time	Rank
Bill Disney	500 m	41.1	8
Tom Gray	500 m	41.5	14
Terry McDermott	500 m	40.1 OR	1st place, gold medalist(s)
Eddie Rudolph	500 m	40.9	6
Floyd Bedbury	1500 m	2:21.3	42
Buddy Campbell	1500 m	2:16.4	25
Dick Hunt	1500 m	2:14.4	15
Eddie Rudolph	1500 m	2:16.8	26
Stan Fail	5000 m	8:31.9	38
Dick Hunt	5000 m	8:09.7	20
Wayne LeBombard	5000 m	8:21.3	29
Wayne LeBombard	10,000 m	17:30.6	30

Women

Athlete	Event	Time	Rank
Jeanne Ashworth	500 m	46.2	4
Mary Lawler	500 m	46.6	7
Jan Smith	500 m	46.2	4
Jeanne Ashworth	1000 m	1:38.7	11
Barb Lockhart	1000 m	1:38.6	10
Jan Smith	1000 m	1:36.7	7
Mary Lawler	1500 m	2:34.9	19
Judy Morstein	1500 m	2:33.3	15
Jan Smith	1500 m	2:37.8	24
Jeanne Ashworth	3000 m	5:30.3	11
Barb Lockhart	3000 m	5:43.2	23
Sylvia White	3000 m	5:42.7	21

== Sources ==
- Official Olympic Reports
- Olympic Winter Games 1964, full results by sports-reference.com
- "Olympic Medal Winners". International Olympic Committee.
