= Speed skating at the 1964 Winter Olympics – Women's 3000 metres =

Women's 3000 metres speed skating at the IX Olympic Winter Games
- Pictogram for speed skating
- Venue: Eisschnelllaufbahn Innsbruck
- Date: 2 February 1964
- Competitors: 28 from 13 nations
- Winning time: 5:14.9

Medalists
1st place, gold medalist(s)		Lidiya Skoblikova; Soviet Union
2nd place, silver medalist(s)		Han Pil-Hwa; North Korea
2nd place, silver medalist(s)		Valentina Stenina; Soviet Union

The women's 3000 metres in speed skating at the 1964 Winter Olympics took place on 2 February, at the Eisschnellaufbahn.

== Records ==
Prior to this competition, the existing world and Olympic records were as follows:

World record	Inga Artamonova (URS)	5:06.0	Alma-Ata, Kazakh SSR, Soviet Union	28 January 1962
Olympic record	Lidia Skoblikova (URS)	5:14.3	Squaw Valley, United States	23 February 1960

== Results ==
Rank	Athlete	Country	Time
1st place, gold medalist(s)	Lidiya Skoblikova	Soviet Union	5:14.9
2nd place, silver medalist(s)	Han Pil-Hwa	North Korea	5:18.5
2nd place, silver medalist(s)	Valentina Stenina	Soviet Union	5:18.5
4	Klara Guseva-Nesterova	Soviet Union	5:22.5
5	Kaija Mustonen	Finland	5:24.3
6	Hatsue Nagakubo-Takamizawa	Japan	5:25.4
7	Kim Song-Soon	North Korea	5:25.9
8	Doreen McCannell	Canada	5:26.4
9	Christina Lindblom-Scherling	Sweden	5:27.6
10	Kaija-Liisa Keskivitikka	Finland	5:29.4
11	Jeanne Ashworth	United States	5:30.3
12	Yasuko Takano	Japan	5:30.4
13	Bak Wol-ja	North Korea	5:30.8
14	Inger Eriksson	Sweden	5:32.6
15	Gunilla Jacobsson	Sweden	5:39.2
16	Kaneko Takahashi	Japan	5:39.6
17	Rita Blankenburg	United Team of Germany	5:40.8
18	Kornélia Ihász	Hungary	5:41.4
19	Kim Gwi-Jin	South Korea	5:41.6
20	Tsedenjavyn Lkhamjav	Mongolia	5:42.6
21	Inge Lieckfeldt	United Team of Germany	5:42.7
21	Sylvia White	United States	5:42.7
23	Barb Lockhart	United States	5:43.2
24	Doreen Ryan	Canada	5:46.5
25	Adelajda Mroske	Poland	5:47.1
26	Helena Pilejczyk	Poland	5:47.3
27	Willy de Beer	Netherlands	5:49.9
28	Erika Heinicke	United Team of Germany	5:56.0
