= Alpine skiing at the 1964 Winter Olympics – Women's slalom =

Women's slalom at the IX Olympic Winter Games
- Alpine skiing
- Venue: Axamer Lizum
- Date: February 1, 1964
- Competitors: 46 from 16 nations
- Winning time: 1:46.71

Medalists
1st place, gold medalist(s)		Christine Goitschel	France
2nd place, silver medalist(s)		Marielle Goitschel	France
3rd place, bronze medalist(s)		Jean Saubert	United States

The Women's slalom competition of the Innsbruck 1964 Olympics was held at Axamer Lizum, Austria.

The defending world champion was Marianne Jahn of Austria.

French sisters Christine Goitschel (gold) and Marielle Goitschel (silver) became the first sisters to win Olympic gold and silver in the same event. They would repeat the double-sibling podium, switching their gold-silver order, in the giant slalom two days later.

== Results ==
Rank	Name	Country	Run 1	Run 2	Total	Difference
1st place, gold medalist(s)	Christine Goitschel	France	0:43.85	0:46.01	1:29.86	-
2nd place, silver medalist(s)	Marielle Goitschel	France	0:43.09	0:47.68	1:30.77	+0.91
3rd place, bronze medalist(s)	Jean Saubert	United States	0:44.78	0:46.58	1:31.36	+1.50
4	Heidi Biebl	United Team of Germany	0:44.61	0:49.43	1:34.04	+4.18
5	Edith Zimmermann	Austria	0:46.24	0:48.03	1:34.27	+4.41
6	Christl Haas	Austria	0:46.43	0:48.68	1:35.11	+5.25
7	Liv Jagge-Christiansen	Norway	0:47.67	0:48.71	1:36.38	+6.52
8	Patricia du Roy de Blicquy	Belgium	0:47.15	0:49.86	1:37.01	+7.15
9	Pia Riva	Italy	0:46.65	0:50.55	1:37.20	+7.34
10	Barbi Henneberger	United Team of Germany	0:47.17	0:50.38	1:37.55	+7.69
10	Heidi Mittermaier	United Team of Germany	0:47.41	0:50.14	1:37.55	+7.69
12	Linda Meyers	United States	0:47.02	0:50.91	1:37.93	+8.07
13	Françoise Gay	Switzerland	0:45.78	0:53.22	1:39.00	+9.14
14	Heidi Obrecht	Switzerland	0:47.37	0:51.96	1:39.33	+9.47
15	Nancy Greene	Canada	0:49.95	0:51.47	1:41.42	+11.56
16	Linda Crutchfield-Bocock	Canada	0:49.38	0:53.77	1:43.15	+13.29
17	Jane Gissing	Great Britain	0:49.70	0:54.48	1:44.18	+14.32
18	Stalina Demidova-Korzukhina	Soviet Union	0:51.88	0:53.09	1:44.97	+15.11
19	Joan Hannah	United States	0:51.36	0:56.03	1:47.39	+17.53
20	Galina Sidorova	Soviet Union	0:51.72	0:56.54	1:48.26	+18.40
21	Tania Heald	Great Britain	0:52.03	0:56.40	1:48.43	+18.57
22	Lidia Barbieri Sacconaghi	Italy	0:53.39	0:55.84	1:49.23	+19.37
23	Majda Ankele	Yugoslavia	0:59.44	0:51.54	1:50.98	+21.12
24	María Cristina Schweizer	Argentina	0:53.43	0:58.45	1:51.88	+22.02
25	Theres Obrecht	Switzerland	1:02.56	0:51.53	1:54.09	+24.23
26	Ildikó Szendrődi-Kővári	Hungary	0:55.86	0:59.05	1:54.91	+25.05
27	Yevgeniya Kabina-Sidorova	Soviet Union	0:52.00	1:07.48	1:59.48	+29.62
28	Christine Smith	Australia	0:58.09	1:05.58	2:03.67	+33.81
-	Traudl Hecher	Austria	0:44.52	DNF	-	-
-	Cécile Prince	France	0:44.76	DQ	-	-
-	Annie Famose	France	0:45.13	DQ	-	-
-	Dikke Eger-Bergman	Norway	?	DNF	-	-
-	Inge Senoner	Italy	?	DQ	-	-
-	Marianne Jahn-Nutt	Austria	DNF	-	-	-
-	Fernande Bochatay	Switzerland	DNF	-	-	-
-	Astrid Sandvik	Norway	DQ	-	-	-
-	Barbara Ferries	United States	DQ	-	-	-
-	Maria Gąsienica Daniel-Szatkowska	Poland	DQ	-	-	-
-	Giustina Demetz	Italy	DQ	-	-	-
-	Krista Fanedl	Yugoslavia	DQ	-	-	-
-	Gina Hathorn	Great Britain	DQ	-	-	-
-	Burgl Färbinger	United Team of Germany	DQ	-	-	-
-	Nancy Holland	Canada	DQ	-	-	-
-	Divina Galica	Great Britain	DQ	-	-	-
-	Judy Forras	Australia	DQ	-	-	-
-	Karen Dokka	Canada	DQ	-	-	-
