= Alpine skiing at the 1964 Winter Olympics – Women's giant slalom =

Women's giant slalom at the IX Olympic Winter Games
- Alpine skiing
- Venue: Axamer Lizum
- Date: February 3, 1964
- Competitors: 46 from 16 nations
- Winning time: 1:46.71

Medalists
1st place, gold medalist(s)		Marielle Goitschel	France
2nd place, silver medalist(s)		Christine Goitschel	France
2nd place, silver medalist(s)		Jean Saubert	United States

The Women's giant slalom competition of the Innsbruck 1964 Olympics was held at Axamer Lizum.

The defending world champion was Marianne Jahn of Austria.

The final results saw the second ever occurrence of female siblings on the same individual's event Olympic podium, with French sisters Marielle Goitschel (gold) and Christine Goitschel (silver) repeating (in reverse order) their top two finish in the slalom two days earlier.

== Results ==
Rank	Name	Country	Time	Difference
1st place, gold medalist(s)	Marielle Goitschel	France	1:52.24	—
2nd place, silver medalist(s)	Christine Goitschel	France	1:53.11	+0.87
2nd place, silver medalist(s)	Jean Saubert	United States	1:53.11	+0.87
4	Christl Haas	Austria	1:53.86	+1.62
5	Annie Famose	France	1:53.89	+1.65
6	Edith Zimmermann	Austria	1:54.21	+1.97
7	Barbi Henneberger	United Team of Germany	1:54.26	+2.02
8	Traudl Hecher	Austria	1:54.55	+2.31
9	Pia Riva	Italy	1:54.59	+2.35
9	Fernande Bochatay	Switzerland	1:54.59	+2.35
11	Theres Obrecht	Switzerland	1:54.91	+2.67
12	Ruth Adolf	Switzerland	1:55.83	+3.59
13	Marianne Jahn-Nutt	Austria	1:55.95	+3.71
14	Giustina Demetz	Italy	1:56.52	+4.28
15	Françoise Gay	Switzerland	1:57.21	+4.97
16	Nancy Greene	Canada	1:57.76	+5.52
17	Patricia du Roy de Blicquy	Belgium	1:58.76	+6.52
18	Burgl Färbinger	United Team of Germany	1:58.84	+6.60
19	Patrizia Medail	Italy	1:59.29	+7.05
20	Barbara Ferries	United States	1:59.44	+7.20
21	Astrid Sandvik	Norway	2:00.74	+8.50
22	Heidi Mittermaier	United Team of Germany	2:00.77	+8.53
23	Divina Galica	Great Britain	2:00.79	+8.55
24	Jane Gissing	Great Britain	2:01.66	+9.42
25	Majda Ankele	Yugoslavia	2:01.81	+9.57
26	Joan Hannah	United States	2:01.97	+9.73
27	Gina Hathorn	Great Britain	2:02.61	+10.37
28	Lidia Barbieri Sacconaghi	Italy	2:02.73	+10.49
29	Liv Jagge-Christiansen	Norway	2:02.98	+10.74
30	Linda Meyers	United States	2:03.46	+11.22
31	Nancy Holland	Canada	2:04.39	+12.15
32	Linda Crutchfield-Bocock	Canada	2:05.04	+12.80
33	Dikke Eger-Bergman	Norway	2:08.62	+16.38
34	Karen Dokka	Canada	2:09.63	+17.39
35	Stalina Demidova-Korzukhina	Soviet Union	2:10.11	+17.87
36	Maria Gąsienica Daniel-Szatkowska	Poland	2:10.20	+17.96
37	Krista Fanedl	Yugoslavia	2:10.76	+18.52
38	Yevgeniya Kabina-Sidorova	Soviet Union	2:11.06	+18.82
39	Galina Sidorova	Soviet Union	2:12.98	+20.74
40	Judy Forras	Australia	2:17.36	+25.12
41	Ildikó Szendrődi-Kővári	Hungary	2:19.24	+27.00
42	María Cristina Schweizer	Argentina	2:19.81	+27.57
-	Madeleine Bochatay	France	DNF	-
-	Heidi Biebl	United Team of Germany	DQ	-
-	Wendy Farrington	Great Britain	DQ	-
-	Christine Smith	Australia	DQ	-
