= 1968 World Allround Speed Skating Championships for women =

International speed skating competition

1968 World Allround Speed Skating Championships for Women
- Venue: Oulunkylä Ice Rink, Helsinki, Finland
- Dates: 27–28 January
- Competitors: 32 from 12 nations

Medalist women
| 1st place, gold medalist(s) | | Stien Kaiser | NED |
| 2nd place, silver medalist(s) | | Ans Schut | NED |
| 3rd place, bronze medalist(s) | | Carry Geijssen | NED |

The 29th edition of the World Allround Speed Skating Championships for Women took place on 27 and 28 January 1968 in Helsinki at the Oulunkylä Ice Rink.

Title holder was the Netherlander Stien Kaiser.

== Distance medalists ==
| Event | Gold (gold) | Silver (silver) | Bronze (bronze) |
|---|---|---|---|
| 500m | Lyudmila Titova | Dianne Holum | Ellie van den Brom |
| 1500m | Stien Kaiser | Ans Schut | Carry Geijssen |
| 1000m | Lyudmila Titova | Stien Kaiser | Carry Geijssen |
| 3000m | Ans Schut | Stien Kaiser | Kaija Mustonen |

== Classification ==
| Rank | Skater | Country | Points Samalog | 500m | 1500m | 1000m | 3000m |
|---|---|---|---|---|---|---|---|
| 1st place, gold medalist(s) | Stien Kaiser | Netherlands | 195.050 | 47.3 (6) | 2:26.4 (gold) | 1:35.0 (2) | 5:08.7 (2) |
| 2nd place, silver medalist(s) | Ans Schut | Netherlands | 197.017 | 48.0 (16) | 2:28.4 (2) | 1:37.5 (11) | 5:04.8 (gold) |
| 3rd place, bronze medalist(s) | Carry Geijssen | Netherlands | 198.016 | 47.7 (14) | 2:29.8 (3) | 1:35.1 (3) | 5:17.0 (5) |
| 4 | Lāsma Kauniste | Soviet Union | 198.684 | 47.5 (9) | 2:30.5 (5) | 1:35.3 (4) | 5:20.2 (6) |
| 5 | Kaija Mustonen | Finland | 198.700 | 47.5 (9) | 2:31.3 (9) | 1:36.8 (8) | 5:14.8 (3) |
| 6 | Lyudmila Titova | Soviet Union | 198.800 | 46.2 (gold) | 2:30.5 (5) | 1:34.5 (gold) | 5:31.1 (14) |
| 7 | Lidiya Skoblikova | Soviet Union | 199.334 | 47.4 (8) | 2:32.3 (12) | 1:37.2 (9) | 5:15.4 (4) |
| 8 | Sigrid Sundby | Norway | 199.383 | 47.3 (6) | 2:31.2 (8) | 1:36.2 (6) | 5:21.5 (9) |
| 9 | Valentina Stenina | Soviet Union | 199.600 | 47.5 (9) | 2:30.0 (4) | 1:36.4 (7) | 5:23.4 (10) |
| 10 | Ellie van den Brom | Netherlands | 200.267 | 46.6 (3) | 2:32.4 (13) | 1:35.8 (5) | 5:29.8 (13) |
| 11 | Wil Burgmeijer | Netherlands | 201.267 | 47.8 (15) | 2:31.5 (10) | 1:39.0 (15) | 5:20.8 (7) |
| 12 | Martine Ivangine | France | 201.300 | 48.0 (16) | 2:32.0 (11) | 1:37.2 (9) | 5:24.2 (11) |
| 13 | Han Pil-hwa | North Korea | 201.516 | 48.6 (20) | 2:30.7 (7) | 1:38.3 (12) | 5:21.2 (8) |
| 14 | Kaija-Liisa Keskivitikka | Finland | 204.234 | 48.5 (19) | 2:32.6 (14) | 1:41.0 (23) | 5:26.2 (12) |
| 15 | Galina Nefyodova | Soviet Union | 205.116 | 48.2 (18) | 2:34.0 (15) | 1:40.6 (22) | 5:31.7 (15) |
| 16 | Arja Kantola | Finland | 205.883 | 47.5 (9) | 2:34.2 (16) | 1:40.4 (21) | 5:40.7 (16) |
| NC17 | Dianne Holum | United States | 147.767 | 46.5 (2) | 2:36.6 (19) | 1:38.8 (13) | – |
| NC18 | Ruth Schleiermacher | East Germany | 149.633 | 46.9 (4) | 2:38.2 (22) | 1:40.0 (19) | – |
| NC19 | Kari Kåring | Norway | 150.067 | 48.7 (21) | 2:35.0 (17) | 1:39.4 (16) | – |
| NC20 | Christina Lindblom-Scherling | Sweden | 150.383 | 49.2 (24) | 2:35.2 (18) | 1:38.9 (14) | – |
| NC21 | Mary Meyers | United States | 151.050 | 46.9 (4) | 2:43.2 (31) | 1:39.5 (18) | – |
| NC22 | Ylva Hedlund | Sweden | 152.333 | 49.5 (27) | 2:39.4 (25) | 1:39.4 (16) | – |
| NC23 | Jeanne Ashworth | United States | 152.550 | 47.6 (13) | 2:42.0 (29) | 1:41.9 (26) | – |
| NC24 | Marie-Louise Perrenoud | France | 152.833 | 49.0 (23) | 2:39.7 (26) | 1:41.2 (24) | – |
| NC25 | Kim Ok-sun | North Korea | 153.800 | 51.2 (29) | 2:36.0 (20) | 1:41.2 (26) | – |
| NC26 | Doreen McCannell | Canada | 154.067 | 49.4 (25) | 2:39.2 (24) | 1:43.2 (28) | – |
| NC27 | Sachiko Saito | Japan | 154.683 | 49.4 (25) | 2:40.6 (27) | 1:43.5 (30) | – |
| NC28 | Adelajda Mroske | Poland | 155.583 | 50.1 (28) | 2:41.5 (28) | 1:43.1 (27) | – |
| NC29 | Kim Bok-sun | North Korea | 155.900 | 51.4 (30) | 2:38.7 (23) | 1:43.2 (28) | – |
| NC30 | Marcia Parsons | Canada | 157.367 | 48.8 (22) | 2:47.3 (32) | 1:45.6 (32) | – |
| NC31 | Jitsuko Saito | Japan | 158.700 | 51.8 (31) | 2:42.6 (30) | 1:45.4 (31) | – |
| NC | Helena Pilejczyk | Poland | 102.717 | DNF | 2:37.7 (21) | 1:40.3 (20) | – |

DNF = Did not finish

== Attribution ==
In Dutch
