= 1964 Winter Olympics medal table =

1964 Winter Olympics medals
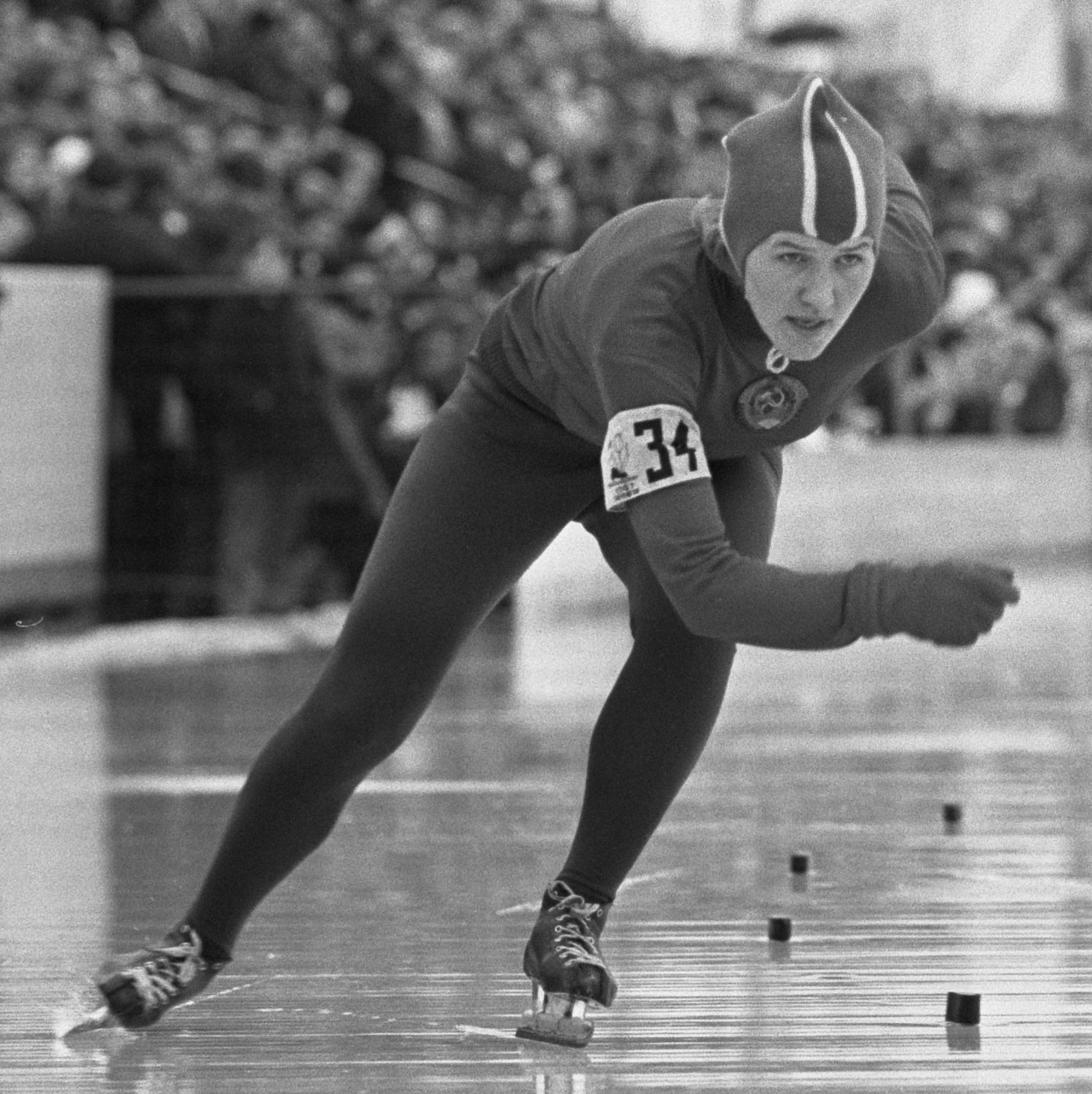
- Lidiya Skoblikova (pictured) won four gold medals at the 1964 Summer Olympics, the most gold and total medals of any competing athlete.
- Location: Innsbruck, Austria

Highlights
- Most gold medals: Soviet Union (11)
- Most total medals: Soviet Union (25)
- Medalling NOCs: 14

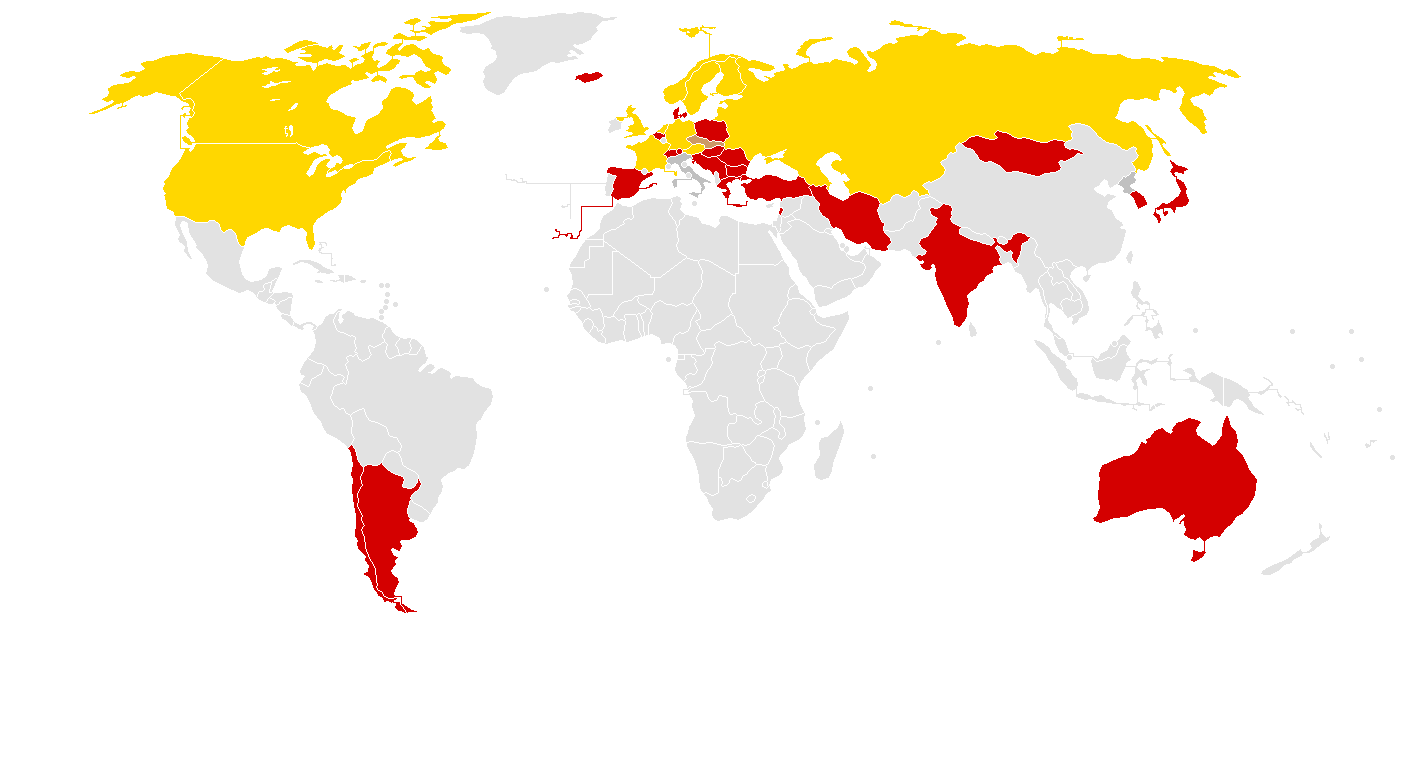
1964 Winter Olympic Games Medals map Legend: Gold represents countries that won at least one gold medal Silver represents countries that won at least one silver medal Bronze represents countries that won at least one bronze medal Red represents countries that did not win any medals Grey represents countries that did not participate

The 1964 Winter Olympics, officially known as the IX Olympic Winter Games, were an international winter multi-sport event held in Innsbruck, Austria, from 29 January to 9 February. A total of 1,091 athletes representing 36 National Olympic Committees (NOCs) participated, including India, Mongolia, and North Korea, who took part in the Winter Games for the first time. The games featured 34 events in 6 sports across 10 disciplines, including the Olympic debut of Luge.

Athletes representing 14 NOCs received at least one medal, with 11 NOCs winning at least one gold medal. Athletes from the Soviet Union won the most gold medals, with 11, and most overall medals, with 25. The Netherlands won their first gold medal at the Winter Games, doing so in the women’s figure skating individual event, while North Korea won their first medal of any kind, taking silver in women's 3,000 metres speed skating. Soviet speed skater Lidiya Skoblikova won four gold medals which was both the most gold and overall medals among individual participants.

== Medal table ==
The medal table is based on information provided by the International Olympic Committee (IOC) and is consistent with IOC conventional sorting in its published medal tables. The table uses the Olympic medal table sorting method. By default, the table is ordered by the number of gold medals the athletes from a nation have won, where a nation is an entity represented by a NOC. The number of silver medals is taken into consideration next and then the number of bronze medals. If teams are still tied, equal ranking is given and they are listed alphabetically by their IOC country code.

At the 1964 Winter Olympics, athletes were tied in three events. In the women's 3000 metres speed skating and women's giant slalom events there were two-way ties for second, which resulted in two silver medals and no bronze medals being awarded in each event. In the men's 500 metres speed skating event there was a three-way tie for second, which resulted in three silver medals and no bronze medal being awarded.

Key

‡ Changes in medal standings (see below)

* Host nation (Austria)

1964 Winter Olympics medal table
| Rank | NOC | Gold | Silver | Bronze | Total |
|---|---|---|---|---|---|
| 1 | Soviet Union | 11 | 8 | 6 | 25 |
| 2 | Austria* | 4 | 5 | 3 | 12 |
| 3 | Norway | 3 | 6 | 6 | 15 |
| 4 | Finland | 3 | 4 | 3 | 10 |
| 5 | France | 3 | 4 | 0 | 7 |
| 6 | United Team of Germany‡ | 3 | 3 | 3 | 9 |
| 7 | Sweden | 3 | 3 | 1 | 7 |
| 8 | United States‡ | 1 | 2 | 4 | 7 |
| 9 | Canada‡ | 1 | 1 | 1 | 3 |
| 10 | Netherlands | 1 | 1 | 0 | 2 |
| 11 | Great Britain | 1 | 0 | 0 | 1 |
| 12 | Italy | 0 | 1 | 3 | 4 |
| 13 | North Korea | 0 | 1 | 0 | 1 |
| 14 | Czechoslovakia | 0 | 0 | 1 | 1 |
| Totals (14 entries) | | 34 | 39 | 31 | 104 |

== Changes in medal standings ==
List of official changes in medal standings
| Year of change | Sport/event | Athlete (NOC) | 1st place, gold medalist(s) | 2nd place, silver medalist(s) | 3rd place, bronze medalist(s) | Net change | Comment |
|---|---|---|---|---|---|---|---|
| 1966 | Figure skating, pairs | Marika Kilius (EUA) DSQ; Hans-Jürgen Bäumler (EUA) DSQ | | −1 | | −1 | At the 1964 Olympics, Kilius/Bäumler, Wilkes/Revell, and Joseph/Joseph placed second, third, and fourth respectively. In 1966, Kilius/Bäumler's were disqualified after it was discovered that they had signed professional contracts during the Olympics. At the time, only amateurs were allowed to compete in the Olympic Games. The silver medals were then awarded to Wilkes/Revell and the bronze medals to Joseph/Joseph. |
| 1966 | Figure skating, pairs | Debbi Wilkes (CAN); Guy Revell (CAN) | | +1 | −1 | 0 | At the 1964 Olympics, Kilius/Bäumler, Wilkes/Revell, and Joseph/Joseph placed second, third, and fourth respectively. In 1966, Kilius/Bäumler's were disqualified after it was discovered that they had signed professional contracts during the Olympics. At the time, only amateurs were allowed to compete in the Olympic Games. The silver medals were then awarded to Wilkes/Revell and the bronze medals to Joseph/Joseph. |
| 1966 | Figure skating, pairs | Vivian Joseph (USA); Ronald Joseph (USA) | | | +1 | +1 | At the 1964 Olympics, Kilius/Bäumler, Wilkes/Revell, and Joseph/Joseph placed second, third, and fourth respectively. In 1966, Kilius/Bäumler's were disqualified after it was discovered that they had signed professional contracts during the Olympics. At the time, only amateurs were allowed to compete in the Olympic Games. The silver medals were then awarded to Wilkes/Revell and the bronze medals to Joseph/Joseph. |
| 1987 | Figure skating, pairs | Marika Kilius (EUA); Hans-Jürgen Bäumler (EUA) | | +1 | | +1 | After a successful appeal by the German IOC, arguing that other pairs had signed similar contracts but had not been exposed and disqualified, Kilius and Bäumler were re-awarded the silvers in 1987. The placements of Wilkes/Revell and Joseph/Joseph remained unclear for many years, as neither pair had been asked to return their medals. In December 2013, the IOC clarified that, since 1987, the intended result was meant to reflect that both the German and Canadian pairs are the silver medalists and the Americans are the bronze medalists. |

List of official changes by country
| NOC | Gold | Silver | Bronze | Net change |
|---|---|---|---|---|
| Canada | | +1 | −1 | 0 |
| United Team of Germany | | −1 | | 0 |
| United Team of Germany | | +1 | | 0 |
| United States | | | +1 | +1 |

== See also ==
- All-time Olympic Games medal table
- List of 1964 Winter Olympics medal winners
- 1964 Summer Olympics medal table
