= United States at the Winter Olympics =

- Flag of the United States
- IOC code: USA
- NOC: United States Olympic & Paralympic Committee
- Medals Ranked 2nd: Gold 126 Silver 133 Bronze 104 Total 363

Winter Olympics appearances (overview)
- 1924; 1928; 1932; 1936; 1948; 1952; 1956; 1960; 1964; 1968; 1972; 1976; 1980; 1984; 1988; 1992; 1994; 1998; 2002; 2006; 2010; 2014; 2018; 2022; 2026

The United States of America has sent athletes to every celebration of the Winter Olympic Games. The United States Olympic & Paralympic Committee (USOPC) is the National Olympic Committee for the United States.

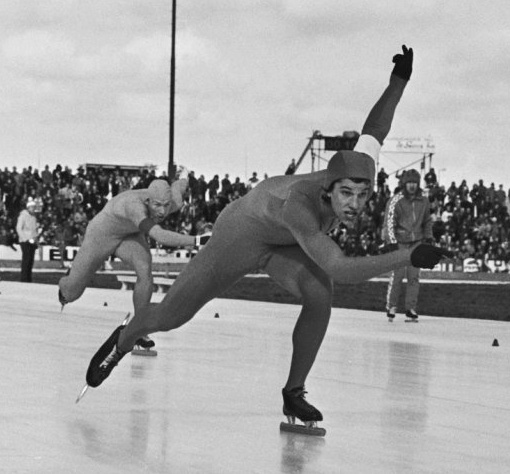
Eric Heiden is the most successful Winter Olympian at a single edition of any Winter Olympics.

== Hosted Games ==
The United States has hosted the Winter Games on four occasions, more than any other nation. It is scheduled to host for a fifth time in 2034.

Games	Host city	Dates	Nations	Participants	Events
1932 Winter Olympics	Lake Placid, New York	February 7–15	17	252	14
1960 Winter Olympics	Squaw Valley, California	February 2–20	30	665	27
1980 Winter Olympics	Lake Placid, New York	February 13–24	37	1,072	38
2002 Winter Olympics	Salt Lake City, Utah	February 8–24	77	2,399	78
2034 Winter Olympics	Salt Lake City, Utah	February 10–26	TBA	TBA	TBA

== Medal tables ==
Host country

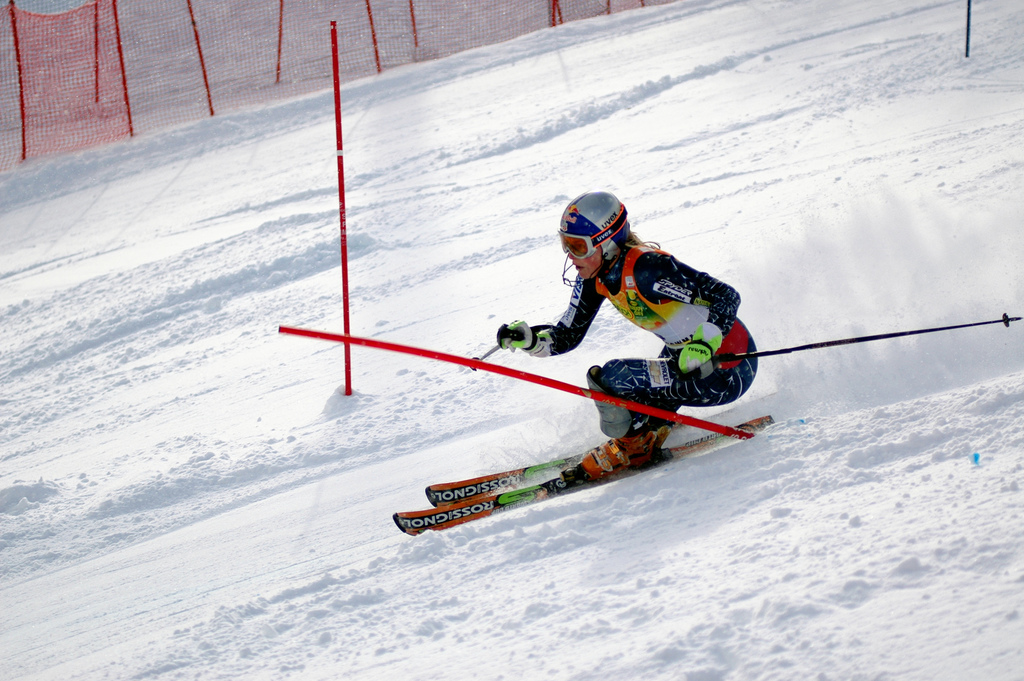
Lindsey Kildow won the gold medal in downhill at the 2010 Winter Olympics, the first one for an American woman.

=== Medals by Winter Games ===
Games	Athletes	Gold	Silver	Bronze	Total	Gold medal	Total medal
1924 Chamonix	24	1	2	1	4	5	3
1928 St. Moritz	24	2	2	2	6	2	2
1932 Lake Placid	64	6	4	2	12	1	1
1936 Garmisch-Partenkirchen	55	1	0	3	4	8	6
1948 St. Moritz	69	3	4	2	9	4	4
1952 Oslo	65	4	6	1	11	2	2
1956 Cortina d'Ampezzo	67	2	3	2	7	6	5
1960 Squaw Valley	79	3	4	3	10	3	2
1964 Innsbruck	89	1	2	4	7	8	8
1968 Grenoble	95	1	5	1	7	9	8
1972 Sapporo	103	3	2	3	8	5	6
1976 Innsbruck	106	3	3	4	10	3	3
1980 Lake Placid	101	6	4	2	12	3	3
1984 Sarajevo	107	4	4	0	8	3	4
1988 Calgary	118	2	1	3	6	9	9
1992 Albertville	147	5	4	2	11	5	6
1994 Lillehammer	147	6	5	2	13	5	5
1998 Nagano	186	6	3	4	13	5	6
2002 Salt Lake City	202	10	13	11	34	3	2
2006 Turin	204	9	9	7	25	2	2
2010 Vancouver	212	9	15	13	37	3	1
2014 Sochi	222	9	9	10	28	4	2
2018 Pyeongchang	241	9	8	6	23	4	4
2022 Beijing	224	9	9	7	25	3	5
2026 Milano Cortina	232	12	12	9	33	2	2
2030 French Alps	Future event						
2034 Utah	Future event						
Total (25/25)	3,183	126	133	104	363	2	2

=== Best results ===
- Gold medals – 12 (2026 Winter Olympics)
- Total medals – 37 (2010 Winter Olympics)

=== Medals by winter sport ===
Leading in that sport

Sport	Gold	Silver	Bronze	Total
Speed skating	32	24	20	76
Alpine skiing	19	22	11	52
Figure skating	19	17	21	57
Snowboarding	17	9	11	37
Freestyle skiing	14	17	10	41
Bobsleigh	9	11	11	31
Ice hockey	6	12	2	20
Short track speed skating	4	7	10	21
Skeleton	3	4	1	8
Cross-country skiing	1	4	2	7
Nordic combined	1	3	0	4
Curling	1	1	1	3
Luge	0	3	4	7
Ski jumping	0	0	1	1
Totals (14 entries)	126	134	105	365

Updated on February 22, 2026

*This table includes two medals – one silver awarded in the ice hockey and one bronze awarded in the figure skating events at the 1920 Summer Olympics.

Biathlon is currently the only winter sport in which the United States has never won an Olympic medal.

== Flagbearers ==
Winter Olympics
Games	Athlete	Sport
1924 Chamonix	Clarence Abel	Ice hockey
1928 St. Moritz	Godfrey Dewey	Cross-country skiing (team manager)
1932 Lake Placid	Billy Fiske	Bobsleigh
1936 Garmisch-Partenkirchen	Rolf Monsen	Cross-country skiing
1948 St. Moritz	Jack Heaton	Skeleton & Bobsleigh
1952 Oslo	Jim Bickford	Bobsleigh
1956 Cortina d'Ampezzo	Jim Bickford	Bobsleigh
1960 Squaw Valley	Don McDermott	Speed skating
1964 Innsbruck	Bill Disney	Speed skating
1968 Grenoble	Terry McDermott	Speed skating
1972 Sapporo	Dianne Holum	Speed skating
1976 Innsbruck	Cindy Nelson	Alpine skiing
1980 Lake Placid	Scott Hamilton	Figure skating
1984 Sarajevo	Frank Masley	Luge
1988 Calgary	Lyle Nelson	Biathlon
1992 Albertville	Bill Koch	Cross-country skiing
1994 Lillehammer	Cammy Myler	Luge
1998 Nagano	Eric Flaim	Speed skating
2002 Salt Lake City	Amy Peterson	Short track speed skating
2006 Turin	Chris Witty	Speed skating
2010 Vancouver	Mark Grimmette	Luge
2014 Sochi	Todd Lodwick	Nordic combined
2018 Pyeongchang	Erin Hamlin	Luge
2022 Beijing	Brittany Bowe	Speed skating
2022 Beijing	John Shuster	Curling
2026 Milano Cortina	Erin Jackson	Speed skating
2026 Milano Cortina	Frank Del Duca	Bobsleigh

== Medals by winter sport ==
=== Current sports ===
==== Ice hockey ====
Games	Gold	Silver	Bronze	Total
1920 Antwerp	0	1	0	1
1924 Chamonix	0	1	0	1
1928 St Moritz	did not participate			
1932 Lake Placid	0	1	0	1
1936 Garmisch-Partenkirchen	0	0	1	1
1948 St Moritz	participated unofficially			
1952 Oslo	0	1	0	1
1956 Cortina d'Ampezzo	0	1	0	1
1960 Squaw Valley	1	0	0	1
1964 Innsbruck	0	0	0	0
1968 Grenoble	0	0	0	0
1972 Sapporo	0	1	0	1
1976 Innsbruck	0	0	0	0
1980 Lake Placid	1	0	0	1
1984 Sarajevo	0	0	0	0
1988 Calgary	0	0	0	0
1992 Albertville	0	0	0	0
1994 Lillehammer	0	0	0	0
1998 Nagano	1	0	0	1
2002 Salt Lake City	0	2	0	2
2006 Turin	0	0	1	1
2010 Vancouver	0	2	0	2
2014 Sochi	0	1	0	1
2018 Pyeongchang	1	0	0	1
2022 Beijing	0	1	0	1
2026 Milano Cortina	2	0	0	2
Total	6	12	2	20

== Russia–United States rivalry ==
Russia (in all its incarnations) and the United States each have won more Olympic medals than any other nation. Russia topped the overall medal count at 7 Summer Olympics and 8 Winter Olympics, while the United States placed first at 19 Summer Olympics and 1 Winter Olympics.

Medal totals of the Soviet Union/Unified Team/Russia/OAR/ROC and the United States since 1956, when the Soviet Union started to compete, are presented below.

Russia
Games	Gold	Silver	Bronze	Total	Rank
1956 Cortina d'Ampezzo	7	3	6	16	1
1960 Squaw Valley	7	5	9	21	1
1964 Innsbruck	11	8	6	25	1
1968 Grenoble	5	5	3	13	2
1972 Sapporo	8	5	3	16	1
1976 Innsbruck	13	6	8	27	1
1980 Lake Placid	10	6	6	22	1
1984 Sarajevo	6	10	9	25	2
1988 Calgary	11	9	9	29	1
1992 Albertville	9	6	8	23	2
1994 Lillehammer	11	8	4	23	1
1998 Nagano	9	6	3	18	3
2002 Salt Lake City	5	4	4	13	5
2006 Turin	8	6	8	22	4
2010 Vancouver	3	5	7	15	11
2014 Sochi	10	10	9	29	2
2018 Pyeongchang	2	6	9	17	13
2022 Beijing	5	12	15	32	9
2026 Milano Cortina	0	1	0	1	25
2030 French Alps	Future event				
2034 Utah	Future event				
Total	140	120	126	386	3

United States
Games	Gold	Silver	Bronze	Total	Rank
1956 Cortina d'Ampezzo	2	3	2	7	6
1960 Squaw Valley	3	4	3	10	3
1964 Innsbruck	1	2	4	7	8
1968 Grenoble	1	5	1	7	9
1972 Sapporo	3	2	3	8	5
1976 Innsbruck	3	3	4	10	3
1980 Lake Placid	6	4	2	12	3
1984 Sarajevo	4	4	0	8	3
1988 Calgary	2	1	3	6	9
1992 Albertville	5	4	2	11	5
1994 Lillehammer	6	5	2	13	5
1998 Nagano	6	3	4	13	5
2002 Salt Lake City	10	13	11	34	3
2006 Turin	9	9	7	25	2
2010 Vancouver	9	15	13	37	3
2014 Sochi	9	9	10	28	4
2018 Pyeongchang	9	8	6	23	4
2022 Beijing	9	9	7	25	3
2026 Milano Cortina	12	12	9	33	2
2030 French Alps	Future event				
2034 Utah	Future event				
Total	109	115	93	317	4

Overall, the United States (1924–present) has won 126 gold and 363 total medals, and Russia (1956–present) has won 140 gold and 386 total medals.

=== Ice hockey ===
The 1980 hockey game between the U.S. and USSR was dubbed the "Miracle on Ice", when American college players defeated the heavily favored seasoned professionals from the Soviet Union on the way to a gold medal at the Winter Olympics in Lake Placid, New York. The Soviet Union had won the gold medal in five of the six previous Winter Olympic Games, and were the favorites to win once more. Though ice hockey is not a major sport in most areas of the United States, the "Miracle" is often listed as one of the all-time greatest American sporting achievements. The U.S. also won the gold medal in the 1960 Games at Squaw Valley, California, defeating the Soviet Union, Canada, Czechoslovakia, and Sweden along the way. However, since this victory is not as well known as the 1980 win, it has come to be known as the "Forgotten Miracle".

The U.S. and the Soviet Union next met at the Olympics in 1988. As in 1980, the Soviets were represented by their star-studded veterans, while the Americans fielded a team of college players. The Soviets won the encounter 7–5 and went on to win the gold medal, while the U.S. placed seventh.

The two teams met again at the 1992 Olympics in a semi-final match. There, the Unified Team (the successor to the Soviet Union) won 5–2. While some stars had left the Soviet Union to play in the NHL, the Unified Team still boasted many veterans from their domestic professional league, while the Americans were represented primarily by college players. The Unified Team eventually won the gold medal, while the U.S. placed fourth.

The U.S. and Russia (the successor to the Unified Team) met twice at the 1996 World Cup of Hockey. The Americans won both games 5–2 en route to the tournament championship.

The U.S., coached by Herb Brooks, and Russia, coached by Slava Fetisov, met twice in the 2002 Winter Olympics in Salt Lake City, which included a 2–2 round-robin draw and a 3–2 semi-final win for the Americans. The semi-final match was played 22 years to the day after the "Miracle on Ice" game. The U.S. eventually won silver, while Russia won bronze.

The two teams met in the quarterfinals of the 2004 World Cup of Hockey, with the U.S. earning a decisive 5–3 victory.

The U.S. and Russia played each other in a round-robin game at the 2014 Winter Olympics in Sochi. The game was tied 2–2 after overtime before the Americans prevailed in an eight-round shootout, with T. J. Oshie scoring on 4 of 6 attempts for the United States. The match has been dubbed by some as the "Marathon on Ice" due to its length. Both teams, however, failed to medal; the Americans finished fourth (losing in the semis to Canada and to Finland in the bronze medal game), while the Russians placed fifth (losing to Finland in the quarterfinals).

== See also ==
- United States at the Olympics
- United States at the Summer Olympics
- List of United States Olympic medalists
