= Saubert =

Saubert is a surname. Notable people with the surname include:

- Eric Saubert (born 1994), American football player
- Jean Saubert (1942–2007), American alpine ski racer
