= United States Olympic team =

United States Olympic team may refer to:

- United States at the Olympics
  - United States at the Summer Olympics
  - United States at the Winter Olympics
- United States Olympic & Paralympic Committee, the National Olympic Committee and the National Paralympic Committee for the United States
