= Mary Lawlor =

Mary Lawlor may refer to:

- Mary Lawlor (actress) (1907-1977), American stage and screen actress
- Mary Lawlor (human rights advocate) (born 1952), Irish professor and human rights figure

== See also ==
- Mary Lawler (born 1944), American speed skater
