= Yevgeniya Sidorova =

Soviet alpine skier (1930–2003)

Olympic medal record

Women's Alpine skiing

Representing Soviet Union
Bronze medal – third place	1956 Cortina	Slalom

Yevgeniya Nikolaevna Sidorova (Russian: Евгения Николаевна Сидорова, later Kabina Russian: Кабина, 13 December 1930 – 29 January 2003) was a Russian alpine skier who competed for the Soviet Union at the 1956, 1960, and 1964 Winter Olympics.

She was born in Moscow. In 1956, she won the bronze medal in the slalom event. In the downhill competition she finished 37th, and in the giant slalom contest she finished 40th.

Four years later, she competed as Yevgeniya Kabina and finished 18th in the 1960 slalom event. In the same year, she finished 20th in the downhill competition and 31st in the giant slalom contest.

At the 1964 Games, she finished 27th in the slalom event, 37th in the downhill competition, and 38th in the giant slalom contest.
