= Patrizia Medail =

Italian alpine skier (born 1945)

Personal information
- Nationality: Italian
- Born: 15 November 1945 (age 80) Bologna, Italy

Sport
- Sport: Alpine skiing

Patrizia Medail (born 15 November 1945) is an Italian alpine skier. She competed in the women's giant slalom at the 1964 Winter Olympics.
