= Bak Wol-ja =

North Korean speed skater (born 1944)

Personal information
- Nationality: North Korean
- Born: 30 June 1944 (age 80); Chungsan, North Korea

Sport
- Sport: Speed skating

Bak Wol-ja (Korean: 박월자, born 30 June 1944) is a North Korean speed skater. She competed in the women's 3000 metres at the 1964 Winter Olympics.
