= An Sen-za =

North Korean speed skater (born 1945)

Personal information
- Nationality: North Korean
- Born: 5 May 1945 (age 79); Hyesan, North Korea

Sport
- Sport: Speed skating

An Sen-za (Korean: 안선자, born 5 May 1945) is a North Korean speed skater. She competed in the women's 1500 metres at the 1964 Winter Olympics.
