= Tom Gray (speed skater) =

American speed skater (1945–2019)

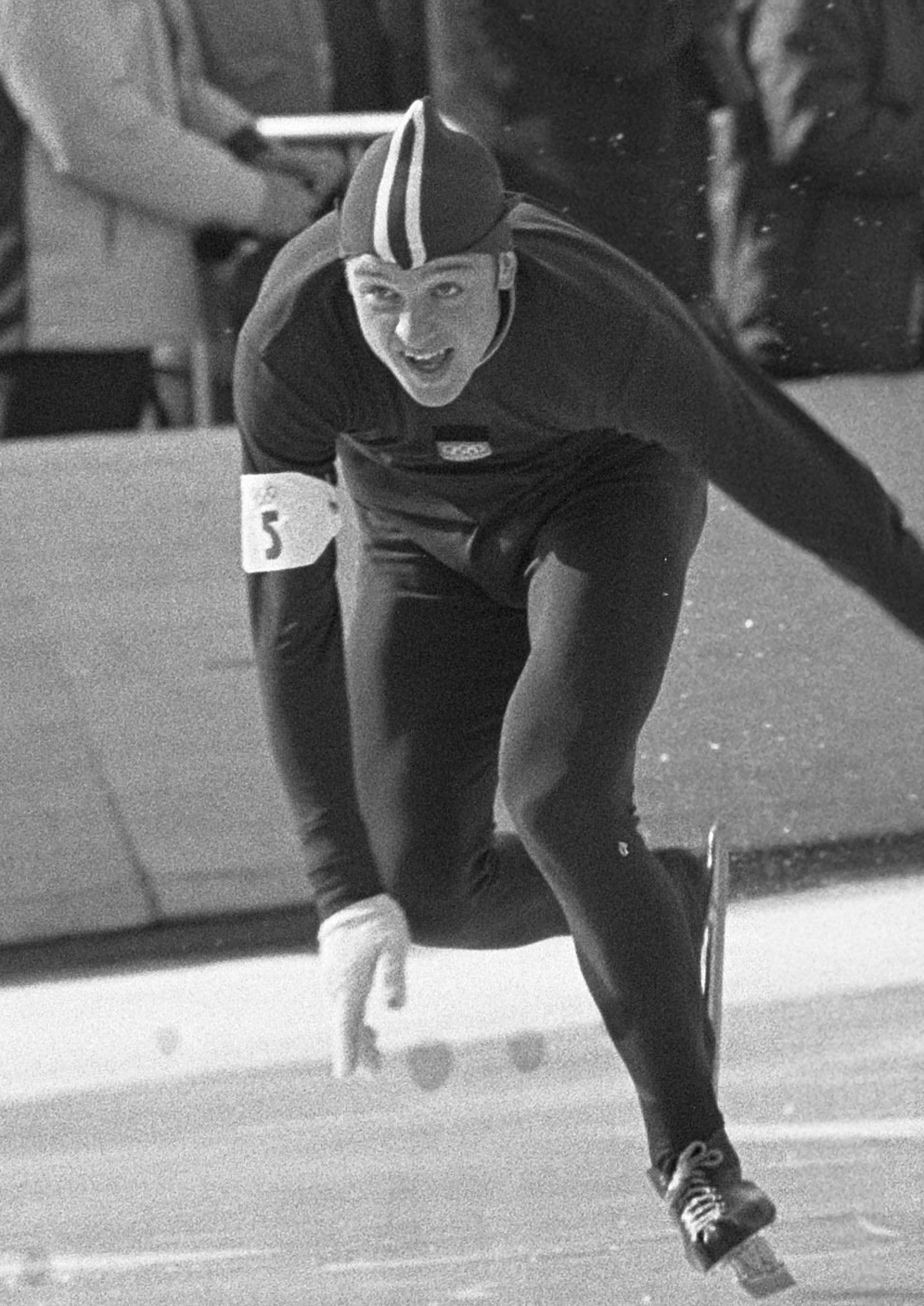
- Tom Gray at the 1968 Olympics

Personal information
- Born: January 6, 1945 Minneapolis, Minnesota, U.S.
- Died: April 25, 2019 (aged 74) Aitkin, Minnesota, U.S.
- Height: 1.78 m (5 ft 10 in)
- Weight: 73 kg (161 lb)

Sport
- Sport: Speed skating
- Club: Bearcat Speedskating Club

Thomas James Gray (January 6, 1945 – April 25, 2019) was an American speed skater who specialized in the 500-meter sprint. In this event he finished in 14th and 21st place at the 1964 and 1968 Winter Olympics, respectively. He won this distance at the 1966 world championships and finished second in 1967. He attended the University of Minnesota and in the late 1960s served in the US Air Force.

Personal bests:

- 500 m – 39.5 (1964)
- 1000 m – 1:26.0 (1968)
- 1500 m – 2:13.1 (1964)
- 5000 m – 9:09.0 (1972)
- 10000 m – 19:23.0 (1972)
