= Christine Goitschel =

French alpine skier

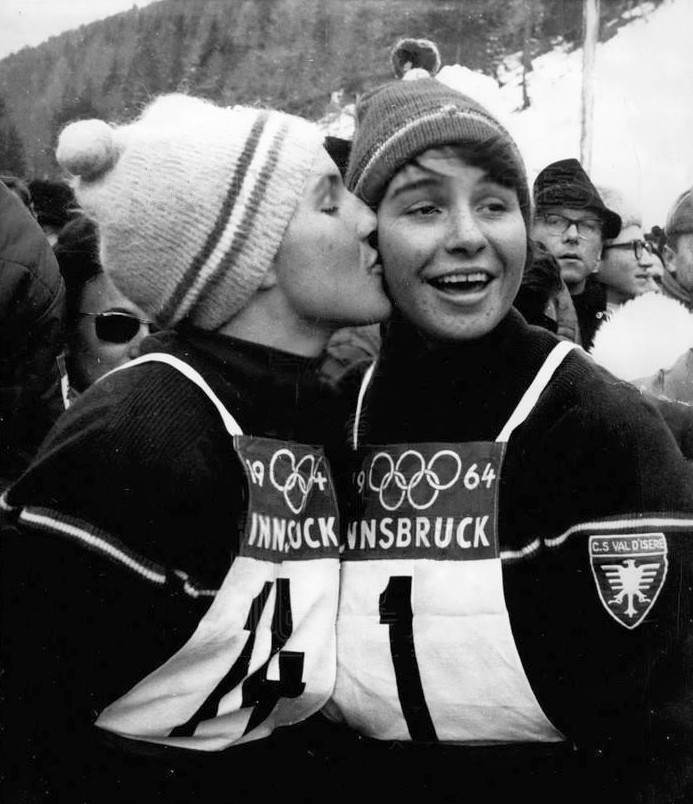
- Christine (left) and her sister Marielle Goitschel at the 1964 Olympics

Personal information
- Born: 9 June 1944 (age 82) Sallanches, France
- Height: 172 cm (5 ft 8 in)
- Weight: 62 kg (137 lb)

Sport
- Sport: Alpine skiing
- Club: CS Val d'Isère
Medal record
Representing France
Winter Olympic Games
Gold medal – first place	1964 Innsbruck	Slalom
Silver medal – second place	1964 Innsbruck	Giant slalom

Christine Béranger-Goitschel (born 9 June 1944) is a former French alpine skier. She is the elder sister of fellow champion skier Marielle Goitschel and the aunt of the former speed skier Philippe Goitschel. Her sister Patricia was a national junior champion in the slalom in 1964.

After great success in the 1964 Winter Olympics, she and her sister Marielle were considered the world's best female skiers. However, Goitschel fractured an ankle in 1966, and retired from her sporting career after the 1968 Winter Olympics in Grenoble, France.

Christine and Marielle Goitschel were the first ever female siblings on the same individual event's Olympic podium, winning the gold (Christine) and silver (Marielle) medals in the 1964 Olympic slalom. They repeated the feat two days later, switching their gold-silver order, in the 1964 Olympic Women's giant slalom.

Goitschel missed the 1968 Winter Olympics due to an injury and retired the same season. She later married her coach, Jean Béranger, and in 1970 they opened the ski resort of Val Thorens. Goitschel also published sports magazines.

She was made a chevalier of the Légion d’honneur in 1995 and was promoted to an officer of the Légion d’honneur in 2009.

== Results and medals ==
=== Winter Olympic Games ===
- 1964 Winter Olympics in Innsbruck (Austria)
  - Gold medal in slalom
  - Silver medal in giant slalom

=== Alpine skiing World Cup ===
- Ranked 10th (1967 Alpine Skiing World Cup)

=== Other ===
- French champion in slalom in 1962 and 1964
- French champion in giant slalom in 1963
