= Kim Hye-suk (speed skater) =

South Korean speed skater

Personal information
- Nationality: South Korean
- Born: 15 August 1946 (age 79) Chungcheongnam, South Korea

Sport
- Sport: Speed skating

Kim Hye-suk (born 15 August 1946) is a South Korean speed skater. She competed in two events at the 1964 Winter Olympics.
