= Ryoo Choon-za =

North Korean speed skater

Personal information
- Nationality: North Korean
- Born: 11 December 1943 (age 81); Hamhung, North Korea

Sport
- Sport: Speed skating

Ryoo Choon-za (born 11 December 1943, Korean: 류춘자) is a North Korean speed skater. She competed in two events at the 1964 Winter Olympics.
