= Patricia du Roy de Blicquy =

Belgian alpine skier (1943–2025)

Personal information
- Nationality: Belgian
- Born: 7 October 1943 Brussels, Belgium
- Died: 21 August 2025 (aged 81)

Sport
- Sport: Alpine skiing

Patricia du Roy de Blicquy (7 October 1943 – 21 August 2025) was a Belgian alpine skier. She competed in three events at the 1964 Winter Olympics. Her eight place finish in the women's slalom at the 1964 Winter Olympics in Innsbruck, Austria remained the best ever finish for a Belgian in Alpine skiing at the Winter Olympics until Armand Marchant's fifth place finish in the men's slalom at the 2026 Winter Olympics in Milan and Cortina d'Ampezzo, Italy.

De Blicquy died from a long illness on 21 August 2025, at the age of 81.
