= Linda Meyers =

American alpine skier (born 1937)

Personal information
- Born: July 1, 1937 (age 89) Los Angeles, California, U.S.
- Height: 5 ft 5 in (1.65 m)
- Weight: 126 lb (57 kg)

Sport
- Sport: Alpine skiing
- Club: University of Utah; Mammoth Mountain Ski Club

Linda Meyers (later Tikalsky, born July 1, 1937) is a retired American alpine ski racer, a former member of the United States Ski Team. She competed at the Winter Olympics in 1960 and 1964. On home state snow in 1960, Meyers tumbled in the downhill event, but completed the descent and placed 33rd; she failed to finish the giant slalom. In 1964, she placed 12th in the slalom and 30th in the giant slalom.

At age fourteen, Meyers moved with her family from Los Angeles to Bishop, California, near Mammoth Mountain, and took up skiing following Jill Kinmont Boothe. In addition to the Olympics, she competed at the World Championships in 1958 and 1962, and finished fifth in the combined event in 1962. After retiring from competitions she coached skiers in Colorado.

== Olympic results ==
| Year | Age | Slalom | Giant Slalom | Super-G | Downhill | Combined |
|---|---|---|---|---|---|---|
| 1960 | 22 | — | DNF | not run | 33 | not run |
| 1964 | 26 | 12 | 30 | not run | — | not run |
