= Sylvia White =

American speed skater

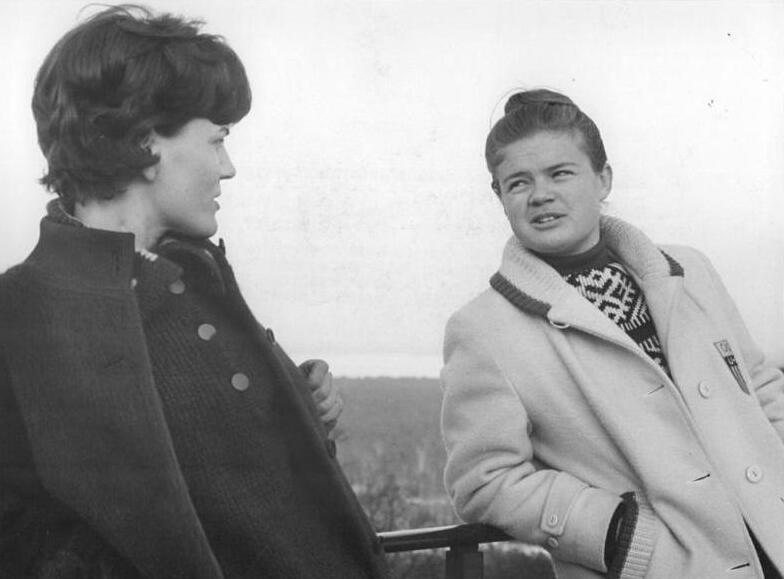
- Sylvia White (right) with Helga Haase (left) in 1964

Personal information
- Nationality: American
- Born: March 29, 1943 (age 81); Seattle, Washington, United States

Sport
- Sport: Speed skating

Sylvia White (born March 29, 1943) is an American speed skater. She competed in the women's 3000 metres at the 1964 Winter Olympics.
