= Richard Taylor (cross-country skier) =

American cross-country skier (born 1938)

Richard William "Dick" Taylor (born January 23, 1938) was an American cross-country skier who competed from 1955 to 1965. He competed in the 1964 Winter Olympics. Taylor was born in Gardner, Massachusetts.
