= Joan Hannah =

American alpine skier (born 1939)

Personal information
- Nationality: American
- Born: April 27, 1939 (age 87) Boston, Massachusetts
- Height: 5 ft 3 1/2 in (1.61 m)
- Weight: 126 lb (57 kg)

Sport
- Sport: Alpine skiing

Joan Hannah (born April 27, 1939) is a retired American alpine ski racer, a former member of the United States Ski Team. She competed at the Winter Olympics in 1960 and 1964. She is a daughter of ski architect Selden J. Hannah.

== Olympic results ==
Year	Age	Slalom	Giant Slalom	Super-G	Downhill	Combined
1960	20	—	—	not run	21	not run
1964	24	19	26	not run	15	not run
