= Brigitte Reichert =

German speed skater

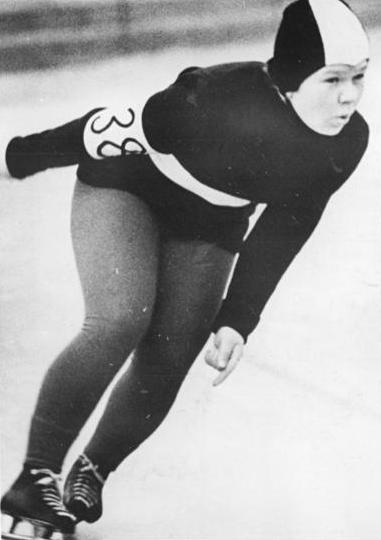

Personal information
- Nationality: German
- Born: 4 May 1946 (age 78); Berlin, Germany

Sport
- Sport: Speed skating

Brigitte Reichert (born 4 May 1946) is a German speed skater. She competed in two events at the 1964 Winter Olympics.
