= Jarmila Šťastná =

Czech speed skater

Personal information
- Nationality: Czech
- Born: 1 July 1932; Bystrovany, Czechoslovakia
- Died: 24 May 2015 (aged 82); Hořice, Czech Republic

Sport
- Sport: Speed skating

Jarmila Šťastná (1 July 1932 – 24 May 2015) was a Czech speed skater. She competed in three events at the 1964 Winter Olympics.
