= Françoise Gay =

Swiss alpine skier (born 1945)

Personal information
- Nationality: Swiss
- Born: 27 January 1945 (age 80); Valais, Switzerland

Sport
- Sport: Alpine skiing

Françoise Gay (born 27 January 1945) is a Swiss alpine skier. She competed in two events at the 1964 Winter Olympics.
