= Kornélia Ihász =

Hungarian speed skater (1937–2022)

Personal information
- Nationality: Hungarian
- Born: 10 June 1937; Budapest, Hungary
- Died: 14 December 2022 (aged 85)

Sport
- Sport: Speed skating

Kornélia Ihász (10 June 1937 – 14 December 2022) was a Hungarian speed skater. She competed in three events at the 1964 Winter Olympics.
