= Marianne Jahn =

Austrian alpine skier (1942–2025)

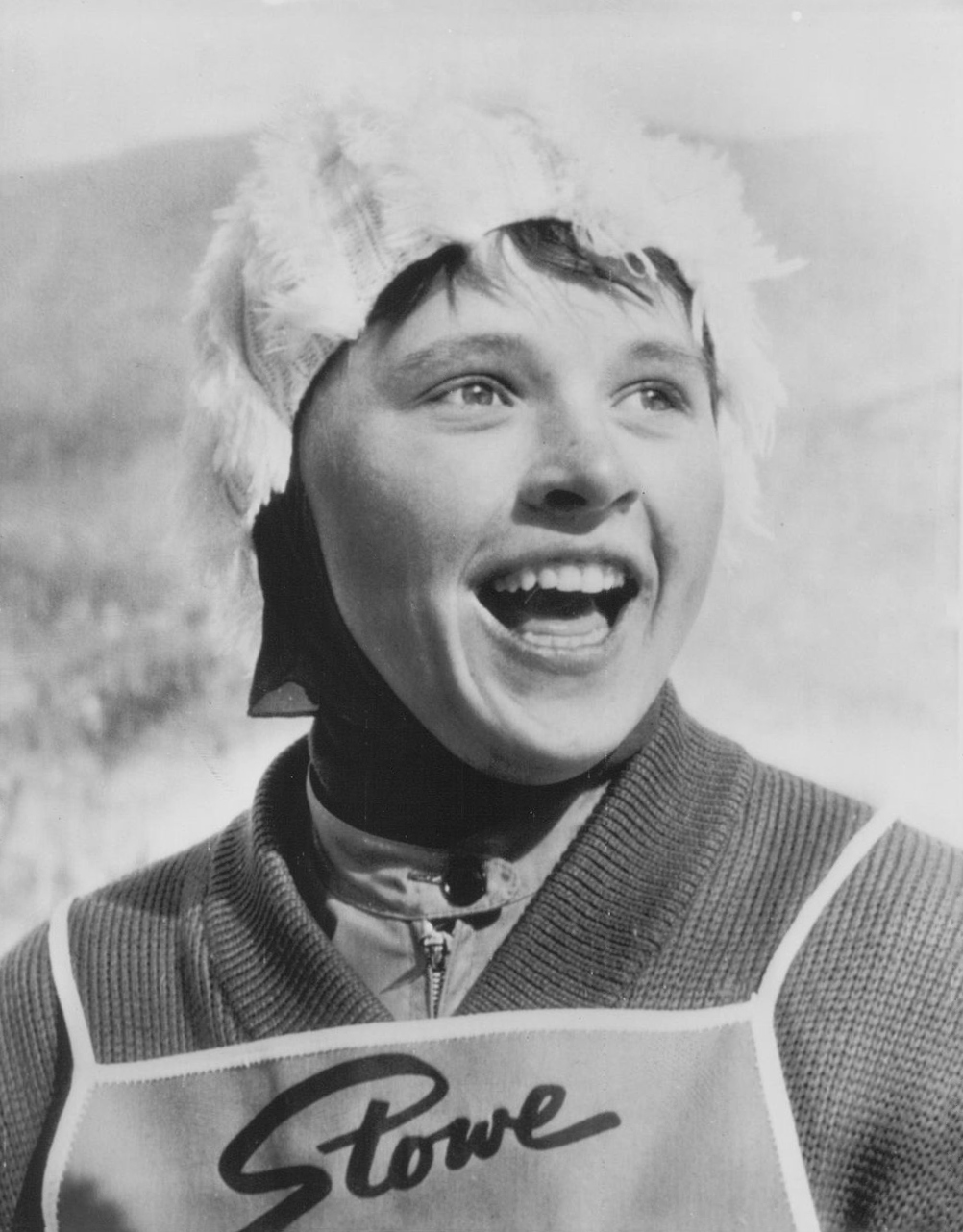
- Jahn in 1960

Personal information
- Born: 14 December 1942 Zürs, Austria
- Died: 30 July 2025 (aged 82) Balzers, Liechtenstein

Sport
- Sport: Alpine skiing
- Club: Ski Club Arlberg
Medal record
Representing Austria
World Championships
Gold medal – first place	1962 Chamonix	Slalom
Gold medal – first place	1962 Chamonix	Giant slalom
Silver medal – second place	1962 Chamonix	Combined

Marianne Jahn-Nutt (14 December 1942 – 30 July 2025) was an Austrian alpine skier. She won two gold medals at the 1962 World Championships, in the slalom and giant slalom events. She competed at the 1960 and 1964 Winter Olympics with the best result of 13th place in the giant slalom in 1964. Jahn died on 30 July 2025, at the age of 82.
