= Bill Disney =

American speed skater

Medal record

Representing United States

Men's Speed skating

Olympic Games
Silver medal – second place	1960 Squaw Valley	500 m

Bill Dale Disney (April 3, 1932 – April 22, 2009) was an American speed skater who competed in the 1960 Winter Olympics and 1964 Winter Olympics.

He was born in Topeka, Kansas. Disney won the silver medal at the 1960 Winter Olympics in speed skating. Bill was also selected to be the flag bearer for the 1964 Winter Olympics opening ceremony.

== Personal records ==
Event	Result	Date	Venue
500 m	39.8	1 December 1963	Colorado Springs
1,500 m	2:14.4	22 December 1963	Colorado Springs
3,000 m	5:19.7	22 February 1959	Squaw Valley

== Olympic results ==
Event	Result	Date	Venue
500 m	40.3	24 February 1960	Squaw Valley
500 m	41.1	4 February 1964	Innsbruck

Olympic Games
Preceded by Rafer Johnson	Flagbearer for United States; Innsbruck 1964	Succeeded by Parry O'Brien
