= Christine Smith (skier) =

Australian alpine skier

Personal information
- Born: December 13, 1946 Cooma, New South Wales
- Died: May 8, 1979 (aged 32)

Sport
- Country: Australia
- Sport: Alpine skiing

Christine Idris Smith (13 December 1946 – 8 May 1979) was an Australian alpine skier. She has been described as a "long-haired blonde with an 'all-Australian girl next door' image."

Born in Cooma, Smith learned to ski at an early age. She was a "stylish and aggressive skier" who competed in the 1962 Commonwealth Winter Games and won the Thredbo Cup in Australia in 1963–64. At the 1964 Winter Olympics, Smith came 27th out of 43 in the downhill. She also came 28th and last in the slalom and was disqualified in the giant slalom. Her performances were affected by the death of a fellow competitor Ross Milne.

In 1965, while recuperating from a ski accident in Europe, she was enlisted to teach The Beatles to ski for their film Help!, and performed in the movie in a short skiing sequence. Smith competed in the World Ski Championships in Chile in 1966, and taught skiing at Thredbo and other venues before establishing an interior design business in 1974.

== Personal life and death ==
In 1977 she married Wayne Arthur Garland.

Smith died in 1979, at the age of 32. The cause of death was suicide.
