= Terry McDermott (speed skater) =

American speed skater (1940–2023)

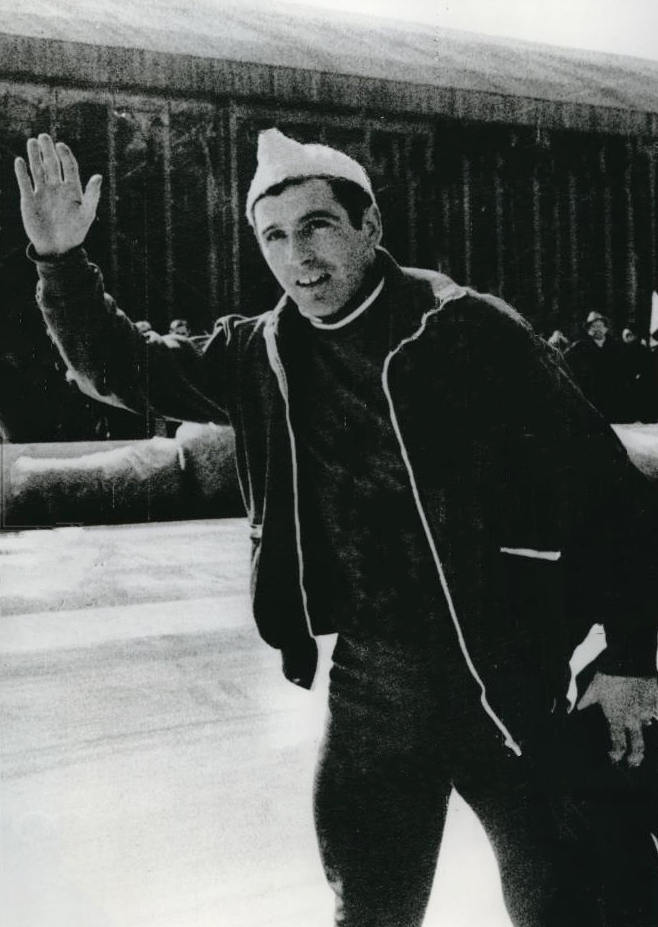
- McDermott at the 1968 Olympics

Personal information
- Full name: Richard Terrance McDermott
- Born: September 14, 1940 Essexville, Michigan, U.S.
- Died: May 20, 2023 (aged 82)

Sport
- Sport: Speed skating
- Club: Boston Ski and Sports Club
- Coached by: Leo Freisinger

Achievements and titles
- Personal bests: 500 m – 39.6 (1964); 1000 m – 1:28.0 (1968); 1500 m – 2:22.1 (1968)
Medal record
Representing the United States
Olympic Games
Gold medal – first place	1964 Innsbruck	500 m
Silver medal – second place	1968 Grenoble	500 m

Richard Terrance McDermott (September 20, 1940 – May 20, 2023), nicknamed The Essexville Rocket, was an American gold and silver medal-winning Olympic speed skater.

Essexville, Michigan's McDermott was a surprise winner in the 500 m at the 1964 Winter Olympics in Innsbruck when he beat the favorite in that distance, two-time defending Olympic champion Yevgeny Grishin, by half a second. His coach at the time was Leo Freisinger, the 500 m bronze medal winner of the 1936 Winter Olympics. McDermott's international career consisted exclusively of the 500 m at the Olympic Winter Games of 1960, 1964 and 1968. In 1968 he skated in unfavorable conditions, late in the day when the sun melted the ice, yet he finished only 0.2 seconds behind the winner.

McDermott was inducted in the National Speedskating Hall of Fame on June 4, 1977. At the 1980 Winter Olympics in Lake Placid, McDermott took the Olympic Oath representing the judges.

McDermott worked as a barber from 1963 to 1967, and after that as a manufacturer's representative in the Detroit area. He later served as a speed skating official. On February 9, 1964, he was a guest on The Ed Sullivan Show, the same night as the first U.S. performance of The Beatles. He resided in Bloomfield Hills, Michigan. He was married to Virginia, and had five children, 11 grandchildren, and one great-granddaughter.

McDermott died on May 20, 2023, at the age of 82.

== Education ==
McDermott is a 1958 graduate of St. John the Evangelist High School in Essexville, Michigan. He then attended Lake Superior State University in 1962. Ultimately, he left before graduating to focus on Skating and his barbering career.

Olympic Games
Preceded by Parry O'Brien	Flagbearer for United States; Grenoble 1968	Succeeded by Janice Romary
