= Dikke Eger-Bergman =

Norwegian alpine skier (born 1943)

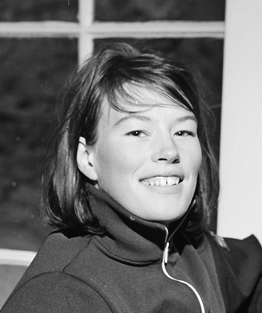
Dikke Eger-Bergman in 1966

Fredrikke "Dikke" Eger-Bergman (born 7 November 1943) is a retired Norwegian alpine skier.

She was born in Stabekk, and represented the club Stabæk IF. She participated at the 1964 Winter Olympics in Innsbruck, where she competed in downhill, slalom and giant slalom. She also participated at the 1968 Winter Olympics in Grenoble.

She was Norwegian champion in slalom in 1961, 1966 and 1967, and in giant slalom in 1966.
