= Jean Saubert =

American alpine skier

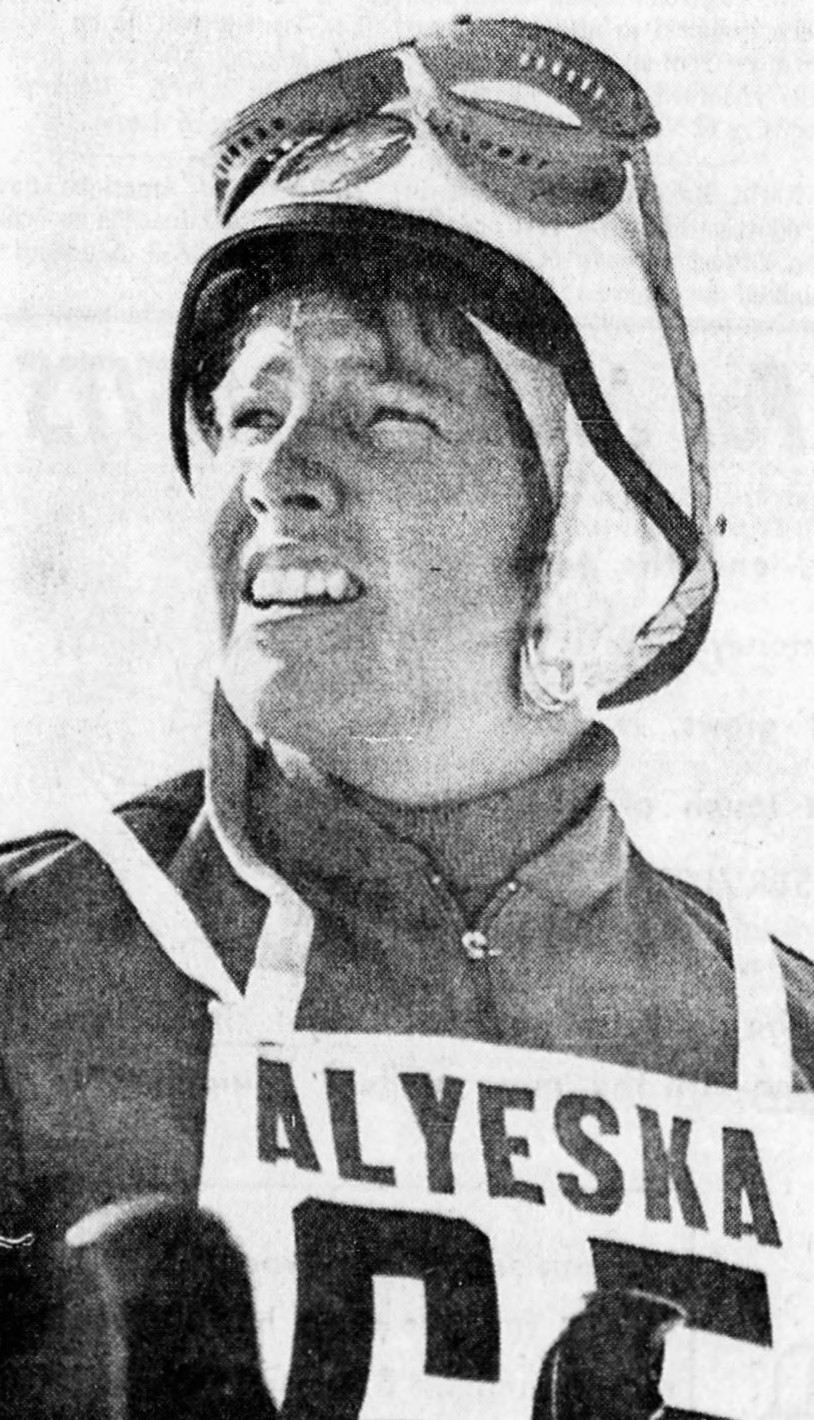
- Saubert in 1963

Personal information
- Born: May 1, 1942 Roseburg, Oregon, U.S.
- Died: May 15, 2007 (aged 65) Bigfork, Montana, U.S.
- Height: 5 ft 6 in (1.68 m)

Skiing career
- Sport: Alpine skiing
- Retired: August 1966 (age 24)
- Disciplines: Downhill, giant slalom, slalom, combined

Olympics
- Teams: 1 – (1964)
- Medals: 2 (0 gold)

World Championships
- Teams: 3 – (1962, 1964, 1966)
- Medals: 2 (0 gold)
Medal record
Women's alpine skiing
Representing the United States
Olympic Games
Silver medal – second place	1964 Innsbruck	Giant slalom
Bronze medal – third place	1964 Innsbruck	Slalom

Jean Marlene Saubert (May 1, 1942 – May 14, 2007) was an alpine ski racer from the United States. She won two medals in the 1964 Winter Olympics at Innsbruck, Austria. After graduating from college, Saubert became an educator.

== Early life ==
Born in Roseburg, Oregon, Saubert grew up in Cascadia and graduated from Lakeview High School in 1960. She learned to ski at Hoodoo Butte and raced competitively at Mount Hood and Mount Bachelor.

== Racing career ==
In 1962, Saubert earned a spot on the U.S. Ski Team and her first international competition was the 1962 World Championships in Chamonix, France, where she finished sixth in the giant slalom. In 1963 and 1964, she was the U.S. downhill and giant slalom champion, and also won the slalom and combined national championships in 1964. She won a total of 8 U.S. championships in her racing career.

At the 1964 Winter Olympics in Innsbruck, Saubert won a bronze medal in the slalom and a silver medal in the giant slalom, losing only to French sisters Christine and Marielle Goitschel. Saubert was the only multiple medal winner for the U.S. in those Olympics, and her medals represented two of the six medals won by the entire United States team. Two years later, Saubert finished fourth in the slalom at the 1966 World Championships in Portillo, Chile. Following the world championships, held in August, Saubert retired from international competition at age 24.

== Post-competition life ==
Saubert returned to Oregon and graduated from Oregon State University in Corvallis in 1966. She joined the Church of Jesus Christ of Latter-day Saints and earned a master's degree at Brigham Young University in Provo, Utah. While in Utah, she taught physical education training and worked as a ski instructor for several years before moving back to Oregon, where she taught elementary school in Hillsboro.

Saubert was inducted into the National Ski Hall of Fame in 1976, and the Oregon Sports Hall of Fame in 1983. She was chosen to be one of the torchbearers for the 2002 Winter Olympics in Salt Lake City, Utah.

Saubert was diagnosed with breast cancer in 2001, and died of the disease at age 65 in Bigfork, Montana where she lived, on May 14, 2007.
