= Kaneko Takahashi =

Japanese speed skater (born 1942)

Personal information
- Nationality: Japanese
- Born: 26 September 1942 (age 82); Karuizawa, Nagano, Japan

Sport
- Sport: Speed skating

Kaneko Takahashi (高橋 カネ子, Takahashi Kaneko, born 26 September 1942) is a Japanese speed skater. She competed in four events at the 1964 Winter Olympics.
