= Inger Eriksson =

Swedish speed skater

Personal information
- Nationality: Swedish
- Born: 7 August 1942 (age 82); Hofors, Sweden

Sport
- Sport: Speed skating

Inger Eriksson (born 7 August 1942) is a Swedish speed skater. She competed in four events at the 1964 Winter Olympics.
