= Barbara Ferries =

American alpine skier (born 1944)

Personal information
- Nationality: American
- Born: September 5, 1944 (age 82)

Sport
- Sport: Alpine skiing

Barbara Ferries (born September 5, 1944) is an American skier. She competed in Alpine skiing at the 1964 Winter Olympics.
