= Gunilla Jacobsson =

Swedish speed skater

Personal information
- Nationality: Swedish
- Born: 7 May 1946 (age 78); Gothenburg, Sweden

Sport
- Sport: Speed skating

Gunilla Jacobsson (born 7 May 1946) is a Swedish speed skater. She competed in four events at the 1964 Winter Olympics.
