= Mary Lawler =

American speed skater

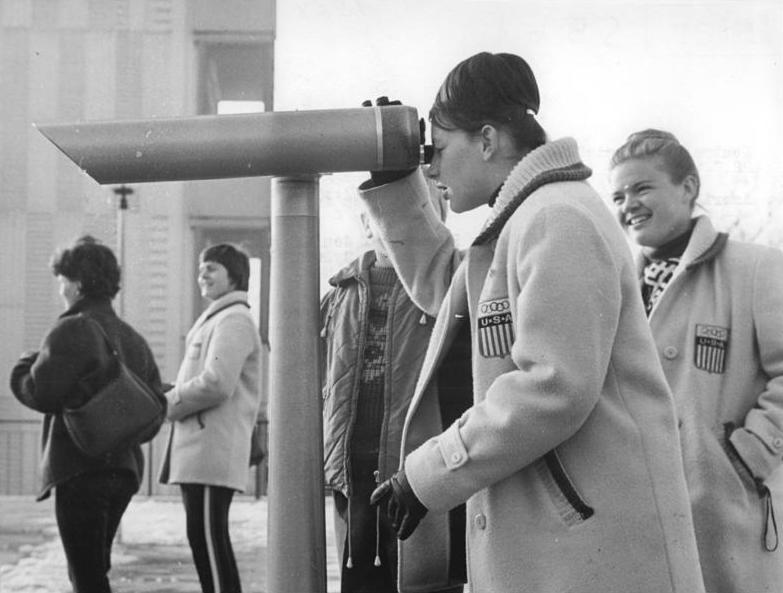
- Lawler in Berlin ahead of the 1964 Winter Olympics

Personal information
- Nationality: American
- Born: November 25, 1944 Minneapolis, Minnesota, United States
- Died: November 14, 1998 (aged 53)

Sport
- Sport: Speed skating

Mary Lawler (November 25, 1944 – November 14, 1998) was an American speed skater. She competed in two events at the 1964 Winter Olympics.
