= Jan Smith (speed skater) =

American speed skater (1945–2022)

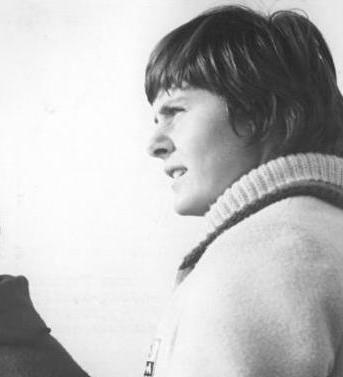
- Smith at the Müggelturm, 1964

Personal information
- Born: April 20, 1945 Rochester, New York, U.S.
- Died: January 18, 2022 (aged 76) Bacliff, Texas, U.S.

Sport
- Sport: Speed skating

Janice Smith (April 20, 1945 – January 18, 2022) was an American speed skater. She competed in three events at the 1964 Winter Olympics. Smith died in Texas on January 18, 2022, at the age of 76.
