= Lidiya Skoblikova =

Russian speed skater

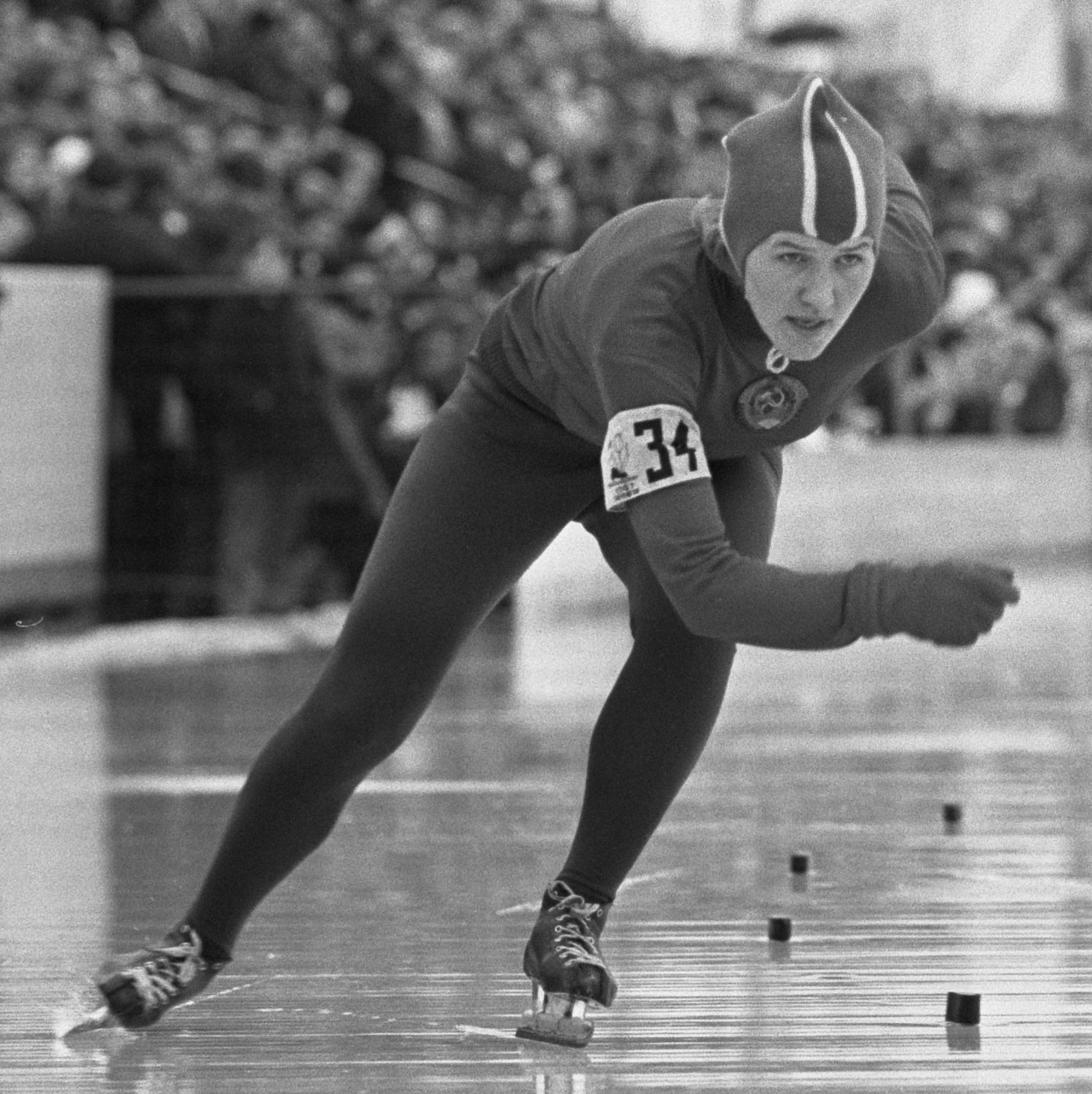
- Lidiya Skoblikova in 1967

Personal information
- Full name: Lidiya Pavlovna Skoblikova
- Born: 8 March 1939 (age 87) Zlatoust, Russian SFSR, Soviet Union
- Height: 1.63 m (5 ft 4 in)
- Weight: 59 kg (130 lb)

Sport
- Sport: Speed skating
- Club: Burevestnik Chelyabinsk, Lokomotiv Moscow
Medal record
Representing the Soviet Union
Olympic Games
| Gold medal – first place | 1960 Squaw Valley | 1500 m |
| Gold medal – first place | 1960 Squaw Valley | 3000 m |
| Gold medal – first place | 1964 Innsbruck | 500 m |
| Gold medal – first place | 1964 Innsbruck | 1000 m |
| Gold medal – first place | 1964 Innsbruck | 1500 m |
| Gold medal – first place | 1964 Innsbruck | 3000 m |
World Championships
| Gold medal – first place | 1963 Karuizawa | Allround |
| Gold medal – first place | 1964 Kristinehamn | Allround |
| Silver medal – second place | 1962 Imatra | Allround |
| Bronze medal – third place | 1959 Sverdlovsk | Allround |
| Bronze medal – third place | 1960 Östersund | Allround |
| Bronze medal – third place | 1961 Tønsberg | Allround |

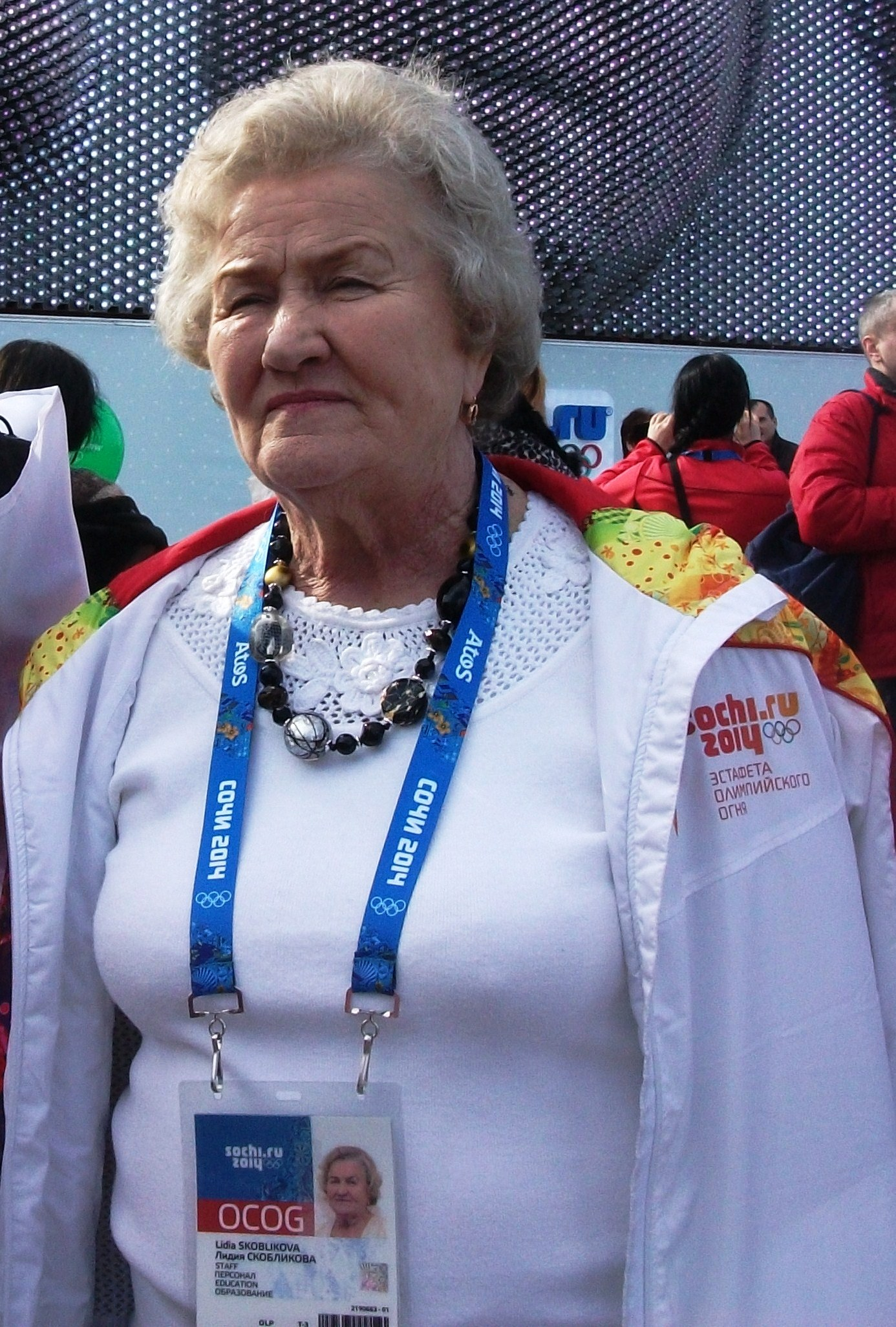
Skoblikova at the Winter Olympic Games 2014 in the Olympic Park of Sochi.

Lidiya Pavlovna Skoblikova (Russian: Лидия Павловна Скобликова; born 8 March 1939) is a retired Russian speed skater and coach. She represented the USSR Olympic team during the Winter Olympic Games in 1960, 1964 and 1968, and won a total of six gold medals, a record she shares with Dutch speed skater Ireen Wüst. She also won 25 gold medals at the world championships and 15 gold medals at the USSR National Championships in several distances. She was also the first athlete to earn six gold medals in the Winter Olympics and the first to earn four gold medals at a single Olympic Winter Games. She was the most successful athlete at the 1960 and 1964 Winter Olympics, sharing the honour for 1960 Games with her compatriot Yevgeny Grishin.

== Career ==
Skoblikova was born in Zlatoust, Soviet Union, some 160 km west of Chelyabinsk, Ural. She trained at Burevestnik and later at Lokomotiv sports societies. At age 19 in 1959, Skoblikova qualified for the Soviet team and placed third in the national championships. She repeated that performance at the world championships, winning two distance medals as well. The next season, she seemed headed for the world title after winning the 500 m and placing 2nd in the 1500 m, but she fell in the 1000 m. By winning the 3000 m, she managed to land on the podium anyway, placing third again. A favourite for the Olympics now, she entered three events. In the first race, the 1500 m, she broke the world record, and won the gold medal. After just missing a second medal in the 1000 m (fourth), Skoblikova approached the world record in the 3000 m (missing it by just half a second), but that was enough for her second gold medal.

During the following years, Skoblikova fought with her teammates to become world champion. In 1961, she won the bronze for the third consecutive time, followed by the silver medal in 1962. In 1963, she finally won the title. In Karuizawa, conditions were excellent, and Skoblikova won all four races, setting a new 1000 m world record in the process.

For the 1964 Olympics, Skoblikova qualified for all four distances, and she won all of them, thereby becoming the first Winter Olympian to win four individual gold medals. This record was only beaten by Eric Heiden who won all five speed skating events in 1980. Two weeks after the Olympics, she repeated her performance from Karuizawa and won all four distances at the world championships.

Skoblikova withdrew from speed skating for two seasons, but returned in 1967, setting a new 3000 m world record in January. She failed to reach the podium at the world championships however, and placed fourth. In 1968, she skated her third and last Olympics, with the best achievement of 6th place in the 3000 m. During her career she won 15 national titles in various distances, but never the all-around championships.

After her retirement in 1969, Skoblikova moved to Moscow to work as a speed skating coach at Lokomotiv. In 1973, she began her studies at The Academy of Labor and Social Relations and received a degree in pedagogy in 1979. She later earned a PhD in history and became a professor. By 1983, she was a member of the Soviet National Olympic Committee, and received a silver Olympic Order from the hands of Juan Antonio Samaranch. For 12 years she was president of the Russian Skating Federation, and in the 1990s was the head coach of the Russian team. In 1996, she was inducted into the International Women's Sports Hall of Fame, and three years later received the Order "For Merit to the Fatherland" from the hands of Boris Yeltsin. On February 7, 2014, she was one of the six people who held the Olympic flag during the opening ceremony of the 2014 Winter Olympics in Sochi.

== Family ==
Skoblikova was born in a working-class family and had three sisters and one brother. She married Aleksandr Polozkov, who was a competitive racewalker and a member of the national team. Aleksandr was a talented coach and trained his wife during some periods of her career. Their son Georgy (b. 14 March 1965) assisted Skoblikova as a coach of the national speed skating team in the 1990s. His first wife, Natalya Polozkova, was also a speed skater and competed at the 1992, 1994 and 1998 Winter Olympics, whereas his second wife, Tanya, won four national titles.

== Records ==
World records
| Nr. | Distance | Time | Place | Date |
|---|---|---|---|---|
| 1 | 1500 meter | 2:25.2 | Squaw Valley | 21 February 1960 |
| 2 | 1000 meter | 1:31.8 | Karuizawa | 22 February 1963 |
| 3 | 3000 meter | 5:05.9 | Oslo | 15 January 1967 |

Russian records
| Distance | Time | Place | Date |
|---|---|---|---|
| 1000 m | 1:32.2 | Medeo | 5 Feb 1963 |
| 1000 m | 1:31.8 | Karuizawa | 22 Feb 1963 |
| 1500 m | 2:25.2 | Squaw Valley | 20 Feb 1960 |
| 3000 m | 5:04.2 | Chelyabinsk | 12 Jan 1964 |

Personal records
| Distance | Time | Place | Date |
|---|---|---|---|
| 500 m | 45.0 | Innsbruck | 30 Jan 1964 |
| 1000 m | 1:31.8 | Karuizawa | 22 Feb 1963 |
| 1500 m | 2:21.8 | Medeo | 27 Jan 1962 |
| 3000 m | 5:04.2 | Chelyabinsk | 12 Jan 1964 |
| Mini combination | 190.817 | Karuizawa | 21/22 Feb 1963 |

== See also ==
- List of multiple Olympic gold medalists at a single Games
- List of multiple Olympic gold medalists
