= Barb Lockhart =

American speed skater

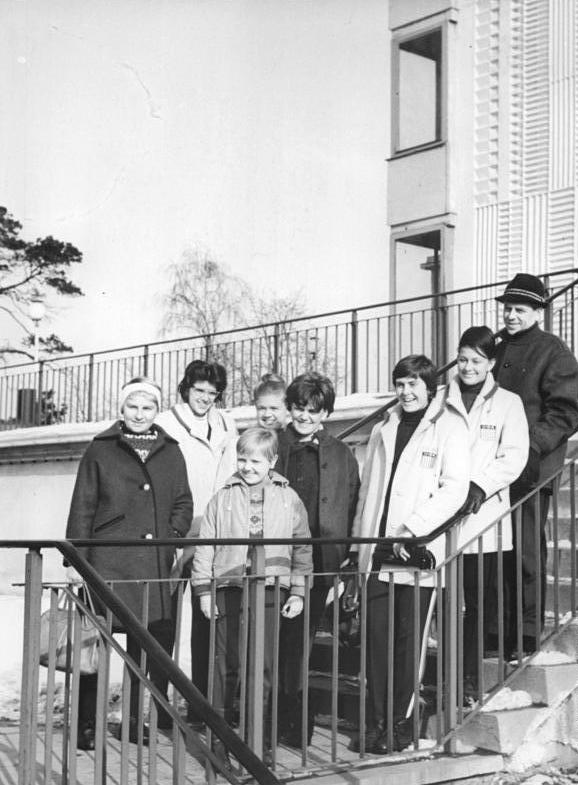
- Lockhart (second from left) in 1964

Personal information
- Full name: Barbara Lockhart
- Born: September 3, 1941 (age 84) Chicago, Illinois, United States

Sport
- Sport: Speed skating

Barb Lockhart (born September 3, 1941) is an American speed skater. She competed at the 1960 Winter Olympics and the 1964 Winter Olympics.

== Personal life ==
Lockhart joined the Church of Jesus Christ of Latter-day Saints just before the 1964 Winter Olympics.
