= Françoise Lucas =

French speed skater (born 1939)

Personal information
- Nationality: French
- Born: 15 March 1939 (age 86); Paris, France

Sport
- Sport: Speed skating

Françoise Lucas (born 15 March 1939) is a French speed skater. She competed at the 1960 Winter Olympics and the 1964 Winter Olympics.
