= Yasuko Takano =

Japanese speed skater (born 1943)

Personal information
- Nationality: Japanese
- Born: 18 October 1943 (age 81); Koumi, Nagano, Japan

Sport
- Sport: Speed skating

Yasuko Takano (鷹野 靖子, Takano Yasuko, born 18 October 1943) is a Japanese speed skater. She competed in four events at the 1964 Winter Olympics.
