= Adelajda Mroske =

Polish speed skater

Personal information
- Full name: Adelajda Mroske-Łabul
- Nationality: Polish
- Born: 25 June 1944; Gdynia, Poland
- Died: 9 January 1975 (aged 30); Elbląg, Poland

Sport
- Sport: Speed skating

Adelajda Mroske-Łabul (25 June 1944 – 9 January 1975) was a Polish speed skater. She competed in four events at the 1964 Winter Olympics.
