= Doreen Ryan =

Canadian speed skater

Personal information
- Born: 27 September 1931 (age 94) Edmonton, Alberta, Canada

Sport
- Sport: Speed skating

Doreen Ryan (born 27 September 1931) is a Canadian speed skater. She competed at the 1960 Winter Olympics and the 1964 Winter Olympics. In-between the Olympics she had three children in December 1962.
