= Han Pil-hwa =

North Korean speed skater

Medal record

Representing North Korea

Women's speed skating

Olympic Games
| Silver medal – second place | 1964 Innsbruck | 3000 m |

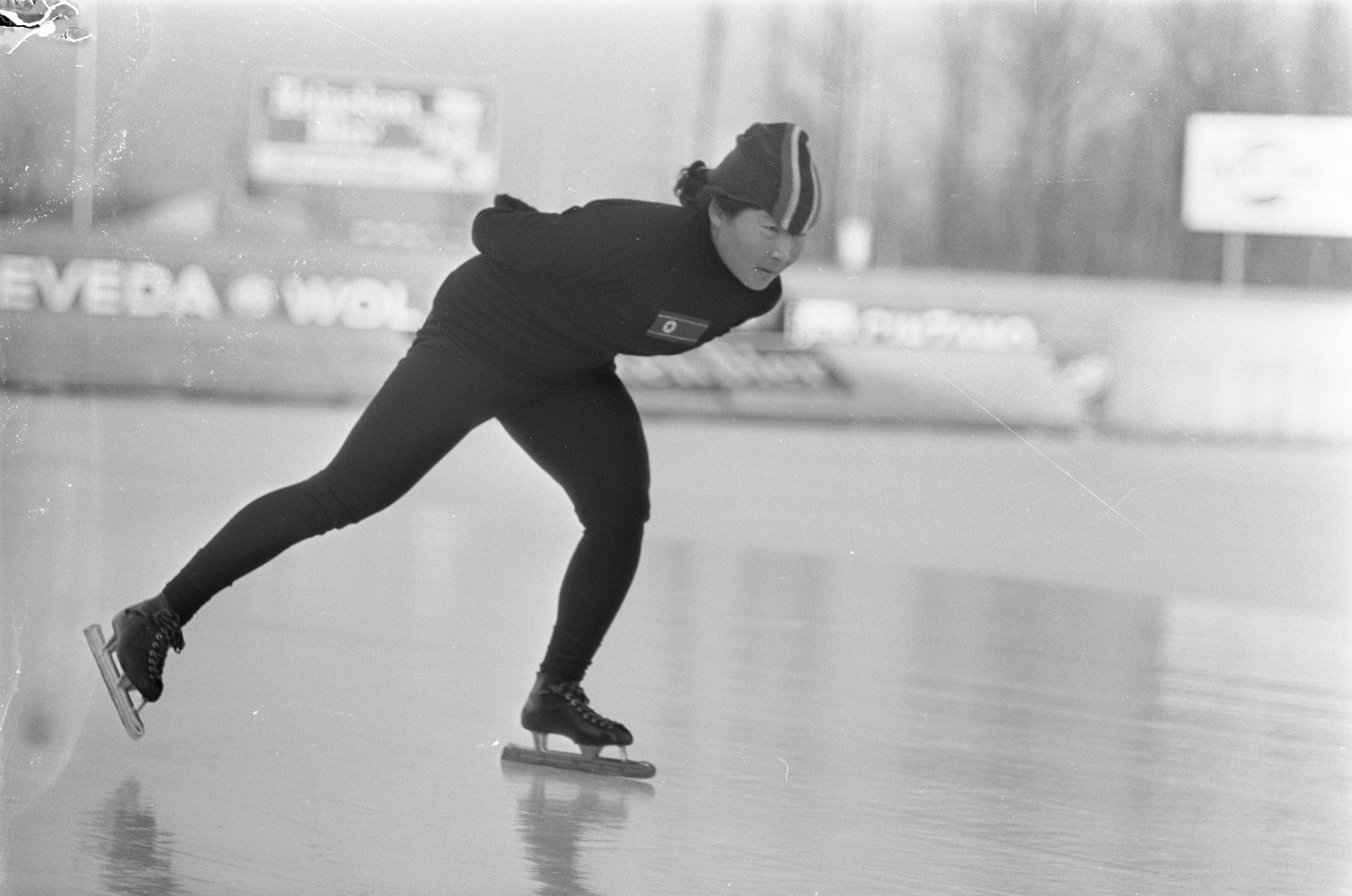
Han Pil-hwa at the 1967 World Allround Speed Skating Championships

Han Pil-hwa (Korean: 한필화; Hancha: 韓弼花; born 21 January 1942) is a female North Korean speed skater who competed in the 1964 Winter Olympics and in the 1972 Winter Olympics. She was the first woman to represent North Korea at the Olympics.

She was born in Nampo, South Pyongan Province.

== Speed skating ==
In 1964, she won the silver medal in the 3000 meter event and became the first Winter Olympic medalist from either Korea. In the 1500 meter competition, she finished ninth and in the 500 meter contest, she finished 28th.

Eight years later, she finished ninth in the 3000 metres event, eleventh in the 1000 metres competition, and 13th in the 1500 metres contest.

Between 1963 and 1968, Han Pil-hwa was also a regular competitor at the World Allround Speed Skating Championships for Women. In the 1965 championships in Oulu, she was most successful with fifth place in the allround event. Her best single distance result was a third place in the 3000 meters at the 1966 championships in Trondheim.

=== Records ===
Over the course of her career, Han Pil-hwa posted the following best results:

Personal records, data from National All Time & Encyclopedia
| Distance | Result | Date | Location |
|---|---|---|---|
| 500 m | 44.9 | 25 Dec 1969 | Bujen |
| 1,000 m | 1:32.3 | 26 Dec 1969 | Bujen |
| 1,500 m | 2:24.2 | 25 Dec 1969 | Bujen |
| 3,000 m | 5:03.7 | 26 Dec 1969 | Bujen |
| Mini combination | 189.732 | 25/26 Dec 1969 | Bujen |

=== Season best performances ===
Over the seasons, Han Pil-hwa skated the following best results:

Season best times, data from National All Time & Encyclopedia
| Season | 500m | 1000m | 1500m | 3000m | Remark |
|---|---|---|---|---|---|
| 1958/59 | 52.7 | 1.48.2 | 2.50.6 | 6.07.0 | all set at the 1959 Kazakh SSR Prize at Medeo, Alma-Ata |
| 1962/63 | 46.8 | 1.36.1 | 2.30.0 | 5.37.2 | all set during the 1963 World Allround Speed Skating Championships for Women at Karuizawa |
| 1963/64 | 48.0 | 1.38.0 | 2.30.1 | 5.18.5 | |
| 1964/65 | 48.8 | 1.41.7 | 2.29.1 | 5.21.6 | all set during the 1965 World Allround Speed Skating Championships for Women at Oulu |
| 1965/66 | 48.7 | 1.37.3 | 2.34.3 | 5.10.9 | all set during the 1966 World Allround Speed Skating Championships for Women at Trondheim |
| 1966/67 | 48.1 | 1.41.4 | 2.28.2 | 5.19.9 | |
| 1967/68 | 48.6 | 1.38.3 | 2.30.7 | 5.21.2 | all set during the 1968 World Allround Speed Skating Championships for Women at Helsinki |
| 1968/69 | 47.2 | 1.36.4 | 2.29.4 | 5.17.0 | all set during a 1969 Socialist friendship meeting in Sverdlovsk |
| 1969/70 | 44.9 | 1.32.3 | 2.24.2 | 5.03.7 | |
| 1970/71 | 47.44 | 1.34.7 | 2.29.6 | 5.07.1 | |
| 1971/72 | | 1.33.79 | 2.25.64 | 5.07.24 | all set during the 1972 Winter Olympics at Sapporo |

== Politics ==
After her career in sports, Han has held various offices in politics and sports administration. She became the chief secretary of the Speed Skating Association in February 1986. She has also been deputy director general of the Guidance Bureau for Winter Sports of the National Sports Committee, head of the Technical Guidance Office for Winter Sports of the National Sports Committee, vice-chairwoman of the Korea Ice Skating Association, and vice-chairwoman of the Athletic Technique Union.

Han is a member of the North Korean headquarters of the National Alliance for the Country's Reunification since January 1991. She was elected to the country's parliament in 1998.
