= Hatsue Nagakubo-Takamizawa =

Japanese speed skater (born 1935)

Personal information
- Nationality: Japanese
- Born: 27 July 1935 (age 89); Nagano, Nagano, Japan

Sport
- Sport: Speed skating

Hatsue Nagakubo-Takamizawa (born 27 July 1935) is a Japanese speed skater. She competed at the 1960 Winter Olympics and the 1964 Winter Olympics.
