= Christina Scherling =

Swedish speed skater (1940–2026)

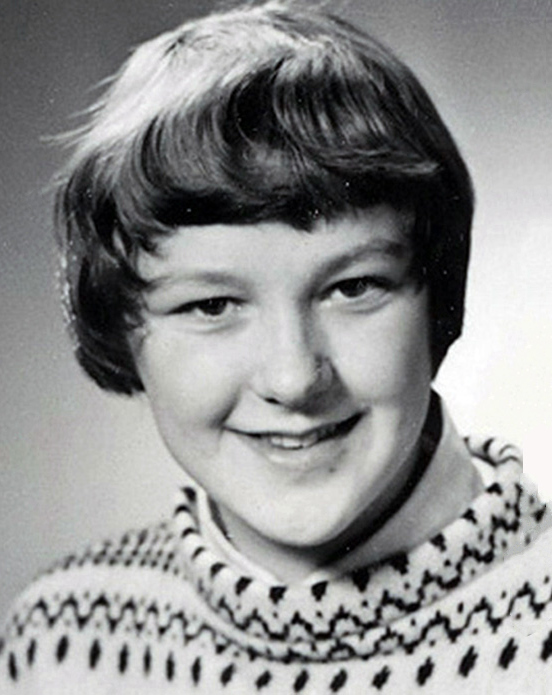

Personal information
- Born: 28 June 1940 Falun Municipality, Sweden
- Died: 24 April 2026 (aged 85) Borlänge, Sweden
- Height: 159 cm (5 ft 3 in)
- Weight: 62 kg (137 lb)

Sport
- Sport: Speed skating
- Club: Kvarnsvedens GIF, Borlänge; Kubikenborgs IF, Sundsvall

Achievements and titles
- Personal best(s): 500 m – 47.0 (1968); 1000 m – 1:35.8 (1970); 1500 m – 2:27.5 (1968); 3000 m – 5:09.8 (1968)

Sigrid Christina Lindblom-Scherling (28 June 1940 – 24 April 2026) was a Swedish speed skater. She competed in 500–3000 m events at the 1960, 1964 and 1968 Winter Olympics and finished in 5–15th place. Scherling died on 24 April 2026, at the age of 85.
