= Jeanne Ashworth =

American speed skater (1938–2018)

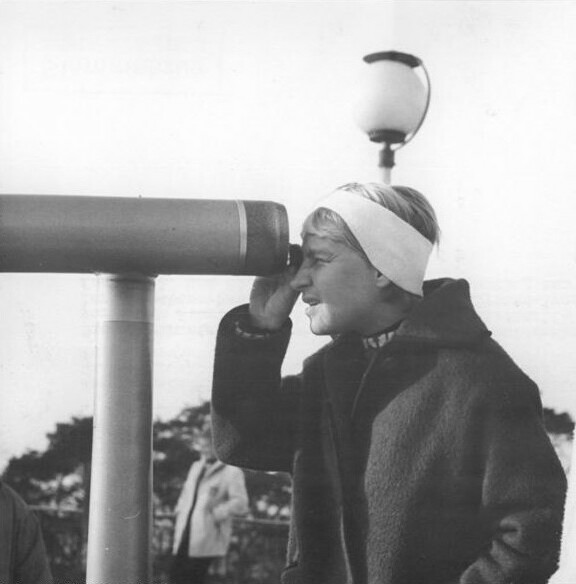
- Ashworth at the Müggelturm, 1964

Personal information
- Full name: Jeanne Chesley Ashworth
- Born: July 1, 1938 Burlington, Vermont, U.S.
- Died: October 4, 2018 (aged 80) Wilmington, New York, U.S.
Medal record
Women's speed skating
Representing the United States
Olympic Games
Bronze medal – third place	1960 Squaw Valley	500 m

Jeanne Chesley Ashworth (July 1, 1938 – October 4, 2018) was an American speed skater who competed in the 1960 Winter Olympics, 1964 Winter Olympics and 1968 Winter Olympics. Ashworth competed in the first Olympic speed skating event for women. She won the bronze medal, finishing behind a German and Russian. During the late 1950s and 1960s, when Ashworth was at the height of her career, she won 11 national championships.

She was born in Burlington, Vermont. She lived near Lake Placid, where she ran her family toy and candy company. She died of pancreatic cancer on October 4, 2018.

Ashworth won the bronze medal at the 1960 Winter Olympics in speed skating. Ashworth died on October 4, 2018, in Wilmington, New York.

== Personal records ==
Event	Result	Date	Venue
500 m	44.4	December 29, 1963	Colorado Springs
1,000 m	1.34.7	February 11, 1968	Grenoble
1,500 m	2.30.3	February 10, 1968	Grenoble
3,000 m	5.14.0	February 12, 1968	Grenoble

== Olympic results ==
Event	Result	Date	Venue
500 m	46.1	February 20, 1960	Squaw Valley
1,000 m	1.36.5	February 22, 1960	Squaw Valley
1,500 m	2.33.7	February 21, 1960	Squaw Valley
3,000 m	5.28.5	February 23, 1960	Squaw Valley
500 m	46.2	January 30, 1964	Innsbruck
1,000 m	1.38.7	February 1, 1964	Innsbruck
3,000 m	5.30.3	February 2, 1964	Innsbruck
1,000 m	1.34.7	February 11, 1968	Grenoble
1,500 m	2.30.3	February 10, 1968	Grenoble
3,000 m	5.14.0	February 12, 1968	Grenoble
