= Kaija-Liisa Keskivitikka =

Finnish speed skater

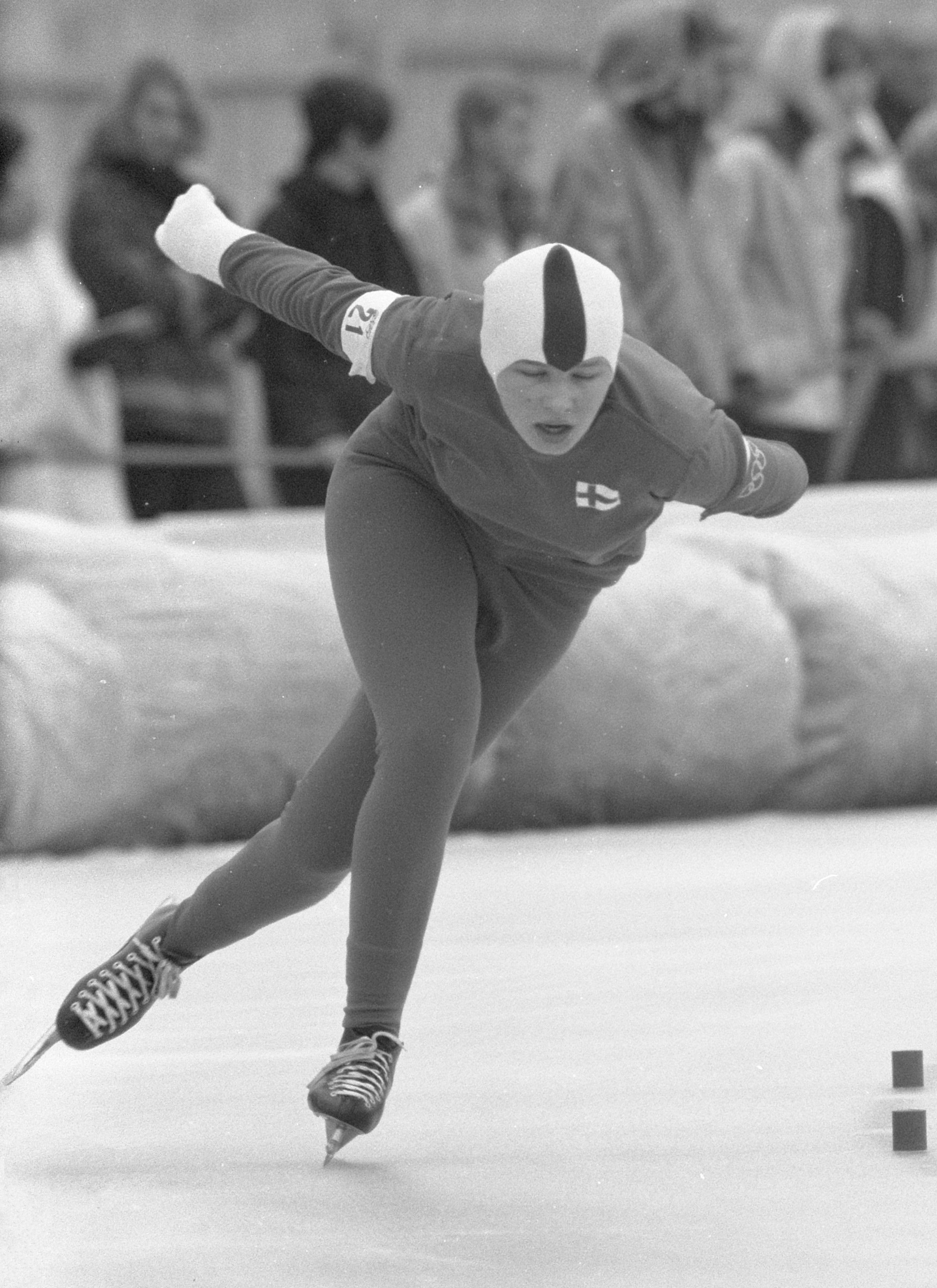
- Kaija-Liisa Keskivitikka in 1968

Personal information
- Nationality: Finnish
- Born: 11 November 1945 (age 79); Rovaniemi, Finland

Sport
- Sport: Speed skating

Kaija-Liisa Keskivitikka (born 11 November 1945) is a Finnish speed skater. She competed at the 1964 Winter Olympics and the 1968 Winter Olympics.
