= Speed skating at the 1964 Winter Olympics =

Speed skating at the IX Olympic Winter Games
- Pictogram for speed skating
- Venue: Eisschnelllaufbahn Innsbruck
- Date: 30 January – 7 February 1964
- No. of events: 8
- Competitors: 134 from 22 nations

Speed skating at the 1964 Winter Olympics, was held from 30 January to 7 February. Eight events were contested at the Eisschnelllaufbahn Innsbruck.

== Medal summary ==
=== Medal table ===
Rank	Nation	Gold	Silver	Bronze	Total
1	Soviet Union	5	5	2	12
2	Norway	1	3	3	7
3	Sweden	1	0	0	1
3	United States	1	0	0	1
5	Finland	0	1	1	2
6	Netherlands	0	1	0	1
6	North Korea	0	1	0	1
Totals (7 entries)		8	11	6	25

The Soviet Union led the medal table with five gold and twelve total, with four of the gold medals won by Lidiya Skoblikova, who swept the women's events.

North Korea's Han Pil-Hwa was the first medalist for her country in the Olympics, and the first Asian woman to win a medal in the Winter Olympics.

Skoblikova easily led the individual medal table, while Knut Johannesen was the most successful male skater with one gold and one bronze medal.

=== Men's events ===
Event	Gold		Silver		Bronze	
500 metres	Terry McDermott; United States	40.1 (OR)	Alv Gjestvang; Norway; Yevgeny Grishin; Soviet Union; Vladimir Orlov; Soviet Union	40.6	none awarded	
1500 metres	Ants Antson; Soviet Union	2:10.3	Kees Verkerk; Netherlands	2:10.6	Villy Haugen; Norway	2:11.2
5000 metres	Knut Johannesen; Norway	7:38.4 (OR)	Per Ivar Moe; Norway	7:38.6	Fred Anton Maier; Norway	7:42.0
10,000 metres	Jonny Nilsson; Sweden	15:50.1	Fred Anton Maier; Norway	16:06.0	Knut Johannesen; Norway	16:06.3

=== Women's events ===
Event	Gold		Silver		Bronze	
500 metres	Lidiya Skoblikova; Soviet Union	45.0 (OR)	Irina Yegorova; Soviet Union	45.4	Tatyana Sidorova; Soviet Union	45.5
1000 metres	Lidiya Skoblikova; Soviet Union	1:33.2 (OR)	Irina Yegorova; Soviet Union	1:34.3	Kaija Mustonen; Finland	1:34.8
1500 metres	Lidiya Skoblikova; Soviet Union	2:22.6 (OR)	Kaija Mustonen; Finland	2:25.5	Berta Kolokoltseva; Soviet Union	2:27.1
3000 metres	Lidiya Skoblikova; Soviet Union	5:14.9	Han Pil-Hwa; North Korea; Valentina Stenina; Soviet Union	5:18.5	none awarded	

== Records ==
Five new Olympic records were set in Innsbruck.

Event	Date	Team	Time	OR	WR
Men's 500 metres	4 February	Terry McDermott (USA)	40.1	OR	
Men's 5000 metres	5 February	Knut Johannesen (NOR)	7:38.4	OR	
Women's 500 metres	30 January	Lidiya Skoblikova (URS)	45.0	OR	
Women's 1000 metres	1 February	Lidiya Skoblikova (URS)	1:33.2	OR	
Women's 1500 metres	31 January	Lidiya Skoblikova (URS)	2:22.6	OR	

== Participating NOCs ==
Twenty-two nations competed in the speed skating events at Innsbruck. Mongolia and North Korea made their Olympic speed skating debuts.

- Austria (7)
- Belgium (1)
- Canada (4)
- Czechoslovakia (2)
- Denmark (1)
- Finland (10)
- France (3)
- Great Britain (3)
- United Team of Germany (13)
- Hungary (3)
- Italy (2)
- Japan (8)
- North Korea (9)
- South Korea (4)
- Mongolia (3)
- Netherlands (5)
- Norway (9)
- Poland (3)
- Soviet Union (16)
- Sweden (10)
- Switzerland (3)
- United States (15)
