= Austrian Alpine Ski Championships =

Austrian national alpine ski championships

Austrian Alpine Ski Championships Österreichischen Meister im alpinen Skisport
- Sport: Alpine skiing
- Founded: 1932; 94 years ago
- Country: Austria
- Website: ÖSV

The Austrian Alpine Ski Championships (German: Österreichischen Meister im alpinen Skisport) are the national championships in alpine skiing, organised every year by the Austrian Ski Federation (ÖSV).

== Results ==
=== Men ===
| Year | Downhill | Super-G | Giant slalom | Slalom | Combined |
|---|---|---|---|---|---|
| 1932 | | | | | Franz Zingerle |
| 1933 | | | | | Siegfried Engl |
| 1934 | | | | | Peter Radacher |
| 1935 | | | | | Friedl Wolfgang |
| 1936 | | | | | Eberhard Kneisl |
| 1937 | | | | | Rudolf Cranz (DEU) |
| 1938 | | | | | Wilhelm Walch |
| 1939 – 1946 | | | | | not disputed |
| 1947 | Edi Mall | | | Egon Schöpf | Edi Mall |
| 1948 | Hellmut Lantschner | | | Egon Schöpf | Egon Schöpf |
| 1949 | Egon Schöpf | | | Egon Schöpf | Egon Schöpf |
| 1950 | Rudi Moser | | | Rudi Moser | Rudi Moser |
| 1951 | Engelbert Haider | | Christian Pravda | Christian Pravda | Christian Pravda |
| 1952 | Andreas Molterer | | Christian Pravda | Christian Pravda | Toni Spiss |
| 1953 | Walter Schuster | | Walter Schuster | Fritz Huber | Otto Linher |
| 1954 | Christian Pravda | | Ernst Hinterseer | Andreas Molterer | Christian Pravda |
| 1955 | not disputed | | Andreas Molterer | Andreas Molterer | Andreas Molterer |
| 1956 | Andreas Molterer | | Andreas Molterer | Ernst Oberaigner | Ernst Hinterseer |
| 1957 | not disputed | | Toni Sailer | Toni Sailer | Toni Sailer |
| 1958 | Josef Rieder; Karl Schranz | | Karl Schranz | Christian Pravda | Karl Schranz |
| 1959 | Mathias Leitner | | Mathias Leitner | Andreas Molterer | Toni Mark |
| 1960 | not disputed | | Andreas Molterer | Josef Stiegler | Ernst Oberaigner |
| 1961 | Heinrich Messner | | Martin Burger | Josef Stiegler | Josef Stiegler |
| 1962 | not disputed | | Martin Burger | Karl Schranz | Karl Schranz |
| 1963 | Karl Schranz | | Josef Stiegler | Karl Schranz | Gerhard Nenning |
| 1964 | not disputed | | Franz Digruber | Heinrich Messner | Franz Digruber |
| 1965 | Karl Schranz | | Hugo Nindl | Heinrich Messner | Hugo Nindl |
| 1966 | Egon Zimmermann, 1939 | | Karl Schranz | Herbert Huber | Hugo Nindl |
| 1967 | Gerhard Nenning | | Heinrich Messner | Heinrich Messner | Hugo Nindl |
| 1968 | Karl Schranz | | Reinhard Tritscher | Herbert Huber | Karl Schranz |
| 1969 | Karl Cordin | | Alfred Matt | Gerhard Riml | Alfred Matt |
| 1970 | Josef Loidl | | Thomas Hauser | Harald Rofner | Josef Loidl |
| 1971 | Karl Cordin | | David Zwilling | Harald Rofner | David Zwilling |
| 1972 | Josef Walcher | | David Zwilling | Thomas Hauser | Josef Loidl |
| 1973 | Josef Walcher | | Hansi Hinterseer | Alfred Matt | not disputed |
| 1974 | Werner Grissmann | | Thomas Hauser | David Zwilling | Michael Koch |
| 1975 | Ernst Winkler | | Thomas Hauser | Josef Pechtl | Reinhard Tritscher |
| 1976 | Ernst Winkler | | Alfred Steger | Hansi Hinterseer | Anton Steiner |
| 1977 | Franz Klammer | | Klaus Heidegger | Klaus Heidegger | Hans Enn |
| 1978 | Josef Walcher | | Hans Enn | Hans Enn | Hans Enn |
| 1979 | Harti Weirather | | Christian Orlainsky | Franz Gruber | Jörg Wirnsberger |
| 1980 | not disputed | | Klaus Heidegger | Klaus Heidegger | not disputed |
| 1981 | Gerhard Pfaffenbichler | | Wolfram Ortner | Franz Gruber | Rudolf Huber |
| 1982 | Harti Weirather | | Franz Gruber | Anton Steiner | Anton Steiner |
| 1983 | Harti Weirather | | Hans Enn | Klaus Heidegger | Rudolf Stocker |
| 1984 | Helmut Höflehner | | Franz Gruber | Bernhard Gstrein | Bernhard Gstrein |
| 1985 | Stefan Niederseer | | Guido Hinterseer | Gerhard Lieb | Guido Hinterseer |
| 1986 | Erwin Resch | | Helmut Mayer | Franz Gruber | Rudolf Stocker |
| 1987 | Leonhard Stock | Leonhard Stock | Rudolf Nierlich | Günther Mader | Ernst Riedlsperger |
| 1988 | Andreas Evers | Guido Hinterseer | Christian Orlainsky | Dietmar Köhlbichler | Ernst Riedlsperger |
| 1989 | Peter Wirnsberger II | Helmut Mayer | Alexander Hödlmoser | Rudolf Nierlich | Peter Wirnsberger II |
| 1990 | Erwin Resch | Günther Mader | Richard Kröll | Günther Mader | Rainer Salzgeber |
| 1991 | Patrick Ortlieb | Richard Kröll | Helmut Mayer | Stephan Eberharter | Rainer Salzgeber |
| 1992 | Patrick Ortlieb | Patrick Ortlieb | Christian Mayer | Thomas Stangassinger | Christian Mayer |
| 1993 | Helmut Höflehner | Peter Wirnsberger II | Helmut Mayer | Michael Tritscher | Dietmar Thöni |
| 1994 | Patrick Ortlieb | Andreas Schifferer | Hans Knauß | Siegfried Voglreiter | Andreas Schifferer |
| 1995 | Patrick Ortlieb | Rainer Salzgeber | Mario Reiter | Mario Reiter | Stefan Curra |
| 1996 | Patrick Ortlieb | Richard Kröll | Hermann Schiestl | Thomas Sykora | Rainer Schönfelder |
| 1997 | Josef Strobl | Andreas Schifferer | Hans Knauß | Thomas Sykora | Christoph Gruber |
| 1998 | Josef Strobl | Andreas Schifferer | not disputed | not disputed | not disputed |
| 1999 | Andreas Schifferer | Fritz Strobl | Patrick Wirth | Ronald Stampfer | Mario Matt |
| 2000 | Michael Walchhofer | Andreas Schifferer | Benjamin Raich | Mario Matt | Kurt Engl |
| 2001 | Fritz Strobl | Josef Strobl | Christoph Alster | Kurt Engl | Matthias Lanzinger |
| 2002 | Andreas Schifferer | Andreas Schifferer | Hannes Reiter | Patrick Bechter | Matthias Lanzinger |
| 2003 | Norbert Holzknecht | Mario Scheiber | Reinfried Herbst | Manfred Pranger | Hannes Reichelt |
| 2004 | not disputed | not disputed | Andreas Schifferer | Manfred Pranger | not disputed |
| 2005 | Hans Grugger | Andreas Buder | Stephan Görgl | Mario Matt | Romed Baumann |
| 2006 | Andreas Buder | not disputed | Hannes Reichelt | Mario Matt | Christoph Nösig |
| 2007 | Norbert Holzknecht | Christoph Alster | Romed Baumann | Alexander Koll | Romed Baumann |
| 2008 | Klaus Kröll | Florian Scheiber; Rainer Schönfelder | Romed Baumann | Reinfried Herbst | Romed Baumann |
| 2009 | not disputed | Hannes Reichelt | Hannes Reichelt | Manfred Pranger | Thomas König |
| 2010 | Hans Grugger | Klaus Kröll | Marcel Hirscher | Alexander Koll | Joachim Puchner |
| 2011 | Max Franz | Björn Sieber | Philipp Schörghofer | Manfred Pranger | Marc Digruber |
| 2012 | Max Franz | Hannes Reichelt | Christoph Nösig | Mario Matt | not disputed |
| 2013 | Johannes Kröll | Romed Baumann | Bernhard Graf | Wolfgang Hörl | |
| 2014 | Frederic Berthold | Daniel Hemetsberger | Philipp Schörghofer | Reinfried Herbst | Frederic Berthold |
| 2015 | Patrick Schweiger | Clemens Dorner | Marco Schwarz | Christian Hirschbühl | Maximilian Lahnsteiner |
| 2016 | Sebastian Arzt | Hannes Reichelt | Philipp Schörghofer | Marco Schwarz | Marco Schwarz |
| 2017 | Hannes Reichelt | Vincent Kriechmayr | Johannes Strolz | Johannes Strolz | Vincent Kriechmayr |
| 2018 | Otmar Striedinger | Vincent Kriechmayr | Manuel Feller | Michael Matt | not disputed |
| 2019 | Manuel Traninger | Christoph Krenn | Roland Leitinger; Johannes Strolz | Marc Digruber | not disputed |
| 2020 | not disputed | Christian Borgnaes | Christian Borgnaes | Simon Rueland | Lukas Passrugger |

=== Women ===
| Year | Downhill | Super-G | Giant slalom | Slalom | Combined |
|---|---|---|---|---|---|
| 1928 | Inge Lantschner | | | | |
| 1929 | Inge Lantschner | | | | |
| 1930 | Emmy Ripper | | | | |
| 1931 | Annemarie Kopp (DEU) | | | | |
| 1932 | | | | | Irma Schmidegg |
| 1933 | | | | | Grete Alt-Lantschner |
| 1934 | | | | | Emmy Ripper |
| 1935 | | | | | Anny Rüegg (SUI) |
| 1936 | | | | | Elvira Osirnig (SUI) |
| 1937 | | | | | Christl Cranz (DEU) |
| 1938 | | | | | Elvira Osirnig (SUI) |
| 1939 – 1946 | | | | | not disputed |
| 1947 | Dagmar Rom | | | Resi Hammerer | Annelore Zückert |
| 1948 | Erika Mahringer | | | Anneliese Schuh-Proxauf | Anneliese Schuh-Proxauf |
| 1949 | Resi Hammerer | | | Resi Hammerer; Anneliese Schuh-Proxauf | Resi Hammerer |
| 1950 | Annelore Zückert | | | Annelore Zückert | Annelore Zückert |
| 1951 | Erika Mahringer | | Erika Mahringer | Erika Mahringer | Erika Mahringer |
| 1952 | Erika Mahringer | | Dagmar Rom | Dagmar Rom | Anneliese Schuh-Proxauf |
| 1953 | Trude Klecker | | Trude Klecker | Trude Klecker | Trude Klecker |
| 1954 | Trude Klecker | | Dorothea Hochleitner | Dorothea Hochleitner | Dorothea Hochleitner |
| 1955 | not disputed | | Josefa Frandl | Dorothea Hochleitner | Dorothea Hochleitner |
| 1956 | Trude Klecker | | Dorothea Hochleitner | Regina Schöpf | Trude Klecker |
| 1957 | Hilde Hofherr | | Hilde Hofherr | Lotte Blattl | Lotte Blattl |
| 1958 | Josefa Frandl | | Josefa Frandl | Kathi Hörl | Josefa Frandl |
| 1959 | Erika Netzer | | Grete Haslauer | Erika Netzer | Erika Netzer |
| 1960 | not disputed | | Hilde Hofherr | Traudl Hecher | Traudl Hecher |
| 1961 | Christl Haas | | Marianne Jahn | Traudl Hecher | Traudl Hecher |
| 1962 | not disputed | | Erika Netzer | Traudl Hecher | Traudl Hecher |
| 1963 | Christl Haas | | Traudl Hecher | Marianne Jahn | Traudl Hecher |
| 1964 | not disputed | | Christl Haas | Grete Digruber | Christl Haas |
| 1965 | Traudl Hecher | | Grete Digruber | Edith Zimmermann | Edith Zimmermann |
| 1966 | Christl Haas | | Ingeborg Jochum | Christl Haas | Christl Haas |
| 1967 | Traudl Hecher | | Erika Schinegger | Gertrud Gabl | Gertrud Gabl |
| 1968 | Olga Pall | | Gertrud Gabl | Gertrud Gabl | Christl Haas |
| 1969 | Olga Pall | | Heidi Zimmermann | Gertrud Gabl | Annemarie Moser-Pröll |
| 1970 | Wiltrud Drexel | | Annemarie Moser-Pröll | Annemarie Moser-Pröll | Annemarie Moser-Pröll |
| 1971 | Ingrid Gfölner | | Annemarie Moser-Pröll | Annemarie Moser-Pröll | Ingrid Gfölner |
| 1972 | Brigitte Kerscher-Schroll | | Annemarie Moser-Pröll | Helene Graswander | Brigitte Kerscher-Schroll |
| 1973 | not disputed | | Annemarie Moser-Pröll | Monika Kaserer | not disputed |
| 1974 | Wiltrud Drexel | | Annemarie Moser-Pröll | Wiltrud Drexel | Annemarie Moser-Pröll |
| 1975 | Nicola Spieß | | Annemarie Moser-Pröll | Annemarie Moser-Pröll | Brigitte Kerscher-Schroll |
| 1976 | Wiltrud Drexel | | Monika Kaserer | Monika Kaserer | Monika Kaserer |
| 1977 | Annemarie Moser-Pröll | | Lea Sölkner | Annemarie Moser-Pröll | Brigitte Kerscher-Schroll |
| 1978 | Brigitte Totschnig | | Annemarie Moser-Pröll | Annemarie Moser-Pröll | Brigitte Totschnig |
| 1979 | Cornelia Pröll | | Annemarie Moser-Pröll | Annemarie Moser-Pröll | Elisabeth Kraml |
| 1980 | not disputed | | Ingrid Eberle | Rosi Aschenwald | not disputed |
| 1981 | Huberta Wolf | | Erika Gfrerer | Sylvia Eder | Sylvia Eder |
| 1982 | Lea Sölkner | | Anni Kronbichler | Rosi Aschenwald | Ingrid Eberle |
| 1983 | Veronika Wallinger | | Elisabeth Kirchler | Karin Buder | Sylvia Eder |
| 1984 | Lea Sölkner | | Claudia Riedl | Roswitha Steiner | Sieglinde Winkler |
| 1985 | Astrid Geislerin | | Sylvia Eder | Ida Ladstätter | Anita Wachter |
| 1986 | Katharina Gutensohn | | Sylvia Eder | Anita Wachter | Adelheid Gapp |
| 1987 | Sylvia Eder | Sigrid Wolf | Sigrid Wolf | Roswitha Steiner | Sylvia Eder |
| 1988 | Christine Zangerl | Christine Zangerl | Ingrid Salvenmoser | Claudia Strobl | Karin Köllerer |
| 1989 | Katharina Gutensohn | Petra Kronberger | Petra Kronberger | Karin Buder | Ingrid Stöcklin |
| 1990 | Monika Kogler | Michaela Dorfmeister | Anita Wachter | Claudia Strobl | Michaela Thaler |
| 1991 | Anja Haas | Andrea Salvenmoser | Ingrid Salvenmoser | Ingrid Salvenmoser | Cornelia Meusburger |
| 1992 | Gabriele Papp | Barbara Sadleder | Cornelia Meusburger | Karin Buder | Cornelia Meusburger |
| 1993 | Veronika Stallmaier | Barbara Sadleder | not disputed | Christina Riegel | Karin Köllerer |
| 1994 | Alexandra Meissnitzer | Alexandra Meissnitzer | Anita Wachter | Anita Wachter | Cornelia Meusburger |
| 1995 | Ingrid Stöcklin | Renate Götschl | Michaela Dorfmeister | Karin Köllerer | Cornelia Meusburger |
| 1996 | Michaela Dorfmeister | Michaela Dorfmeister | Stefanie Schuster | Sabine Egger | Michaela Dorfmeister |
| 1997 | Brigitte Obermoser | Michaela Dorfmeister | Anita Wachter | Sabine Egger | Eveline Rohregger |
| 1998 | Renate Götschl | Alexandra Meissnitzer | not disputed | Karin Köllerer | Stefanie Schuster |
| 1999 | Brigitte Obermoser | Brigitte Obermoser | Alexandra Meissnitzer | Sabine Egger | Brigitte Obermoser |
| 2000 | Kerstin Reisenhofer | Brigitte Obermoser | Michaela Dorfmeister | Karin Köllerer | Christine Sponring |
| 2001 | Stefanie Schuster | Ingrid Rumpfhuber | Eveline Rohregger | Christine Sponring | Stefanie Schuster |
| 2002 | Michaela Kirchgasser | Alexandra Meissnitzer | Martina Lechner | Marlies Schild | Daniela Müllerin |
| 2003 | Astrid Vierthaler | Brigitte Obermoser | Eveline Rohregger | Marlies Schild | Michaela Kirchgasser |
| 2004 | not disputed | not disputed | Alexandra Meissnitzer | Elisabeth Görgl | not disputed |
| 2005 | Christine Sponring | Brigitte Obermoser | Nicole Hosp | Elisabeth Görgl | Elisabeth Görgl |
| 2006 | Maria Holaus | Elisabeth Görgl | Eva-Maria Brem | Eva-Maria Brem | Michaela Nösig |
| 2007 | Nicole Schmidhofer | Nicole Schmidhofer | Michaela Kirchgasser | Katrin Triendl | Eva-Maria Brem |
| 2008 | Michaela Kirchgasser | Silvia Bergerin | Nicole Hosp | Marlies Schild | Michaela Kirchgasser |
| 2009 | not disputed | Nicole Schmidhofer | Kathrin Zettel | Kathrin Zettel | Ramona Siebenhofer |
| 2010 | Christina Staudinger | Elisabeth Görgl | Evelyn Pernkopf | Marlies Schild | Carmen Thalmann |
| 2011 | Jessica Depauli | Anna Fenninger Anna Veith | Lisa-Maria Reiss | Marlies Schild | Jessica Depauli |
| 2012 | Tamara Tippler | Stefanie Köhle | Stefanie Köhle | Jessica Depauli | not disputed |
| 2013 | Stefanie Moser | Stephanie Venier | Eva-Maria Brem | Alexandra Daum | |
| 2014 | Mirjam Puchner | Rosina Schneeberger | Kathrin Zettel | Kathrin Zettel | Anna Fenninger Anna Veith |
| 2015 | Mirjam Puchner | not disputed | Ramona Siebenhofer | Carmen Thalmann | Denise Zöhrer |
| 2016 | Tamara Tippler; Christina Ager | Elisabeth Görgl | Ricarda Haaser | Stephanie Brunner | Rosina Schneeberger |
| 2017 | not disputed | Rosina Schneeberger | Elisabeth Kappaurer | Julia Grünwald | Ricarda Haaser |
| 2018 | Christine Scheyer | Ricarda Haaser | Elisabeth Kappaurer | Bernadette Schild | not disputed |
| 2019 | Lisa Grill | Ariane Rädler | Katharina Liensberger | Katharina Liensberger | not disputed |
| 2020 | not disputed | Christina Ager | Elisa Mörzinger | Katharina Huber | not disputed |
