= Ganslernhang =

Men's slalom ski course in Kitzbühel, Austria

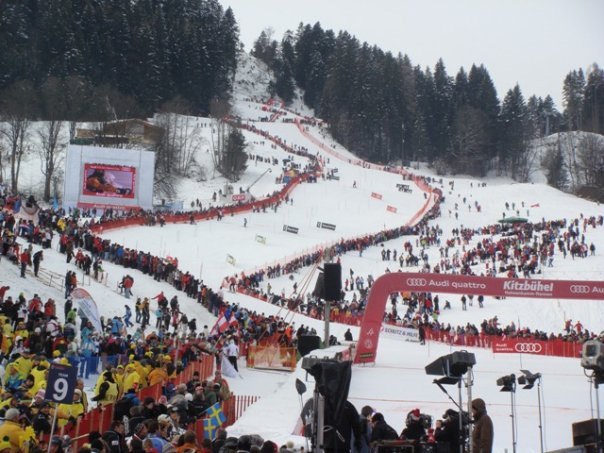
- Slalom course at the 2010 World Cup
- Interactive map of Ganslernhang
- Location within Austria
- 47°26′33″N 12°22′45″E
- Location: Kitzbühel, Austria
- Mountain: Hahnenkamm
- Opened: 1937; 89 years ago
- Member: Club5+
- Competition: Hahnenkamm Races

Slalom
- Start: 1,002 m (3,287 ft) (AA)
- Finish: 811 m (2,661 ft)
- Vertical drop: 193 m (633 ft)
- Length: 590 m (1,935.70 ft)
- Max incline: 35 degrees (70%)
- Avg incline: 19.3 degrees (35%)
- Min incline: 11.3 degrees (20%)
- Most Wins (M): (Sweden) Ingemar Stenmark (5x)

Ganslernhang (short: Ganslern) is a men's classic slalom World Cup ski course in Kitzbühel, Austria, part of the Hahnenkamm Races since 1937. It is located on the Hahnenkamm mountain (Kitzbühel Alps) in Kitzbühel, Tyrol, adjacent to the famous "Streif" downhill course.

Ingemar Stenmark of Sweden has the most World Cup wins on the Ganslernhang, with five. On the course in 2022, Dave Ryding became the first Briton to win a World Cup race. With an average attendance of 25,000, the Kitzbühel slalom ranks second in attendance on the circuit, behind Schladming, also in Austria.

== History ==
From 1931 to 1936, the championship was held on nearby courses "Hahnenkamm" and "Ehrenbachhöhe". Since its premiere in 1937, the Hahnenkamm slalom has been held on this course (Ganslern). In 1954, by exception, no Hahnenkamm Trophy was awarded, they were competing on the so-called "Vorderganslern" at Austrian International Winter Sports III competition. Prior to the introduction of the World Cup in 1967, it was one of the annual fixtures in FIS's racing calendar.

In 1964, 1988, and 1993, the slaloms were cancelled and held elsewhere. In 1970, the downhill was cancelled and replaced with a giant slalom (for the only time); together with slalom counted for classic Hahnenkamm combined event, and an additional slalom was held the following year. In 1998 and 2007, additional slaloms were held on this course, replacing other cancelled venues on the so-called "Vorderganslern" to the finish line of the "Streif". In 2007 and 2008, this route was chosen again due to the high number of spectators; it returned to the traditional Ganslernhang course in 2009.

=== Sections ===
- Goasweg
- Steilhang
- Doppelwelle
- Querfahrt
- Stadl Kurve
- Talei

== Results ==
=== Men ===
No.	Type	Date	Winner	Second	Third
International Hahnenkamm Races
"Hahnenkamm" course
—	SL	29 March 1931	(Austria) Hans Mariacher	(United Kingdom) Gordon Cleaver	(Austria) Hansjörg Schlechter
"Ehrenbachhöhe" course
—	SL	20 March 1932	(Austria) Hans Hauser	(Austria) Rudolph Matt	(Austria) Willy Faude
	SL	1933	race was planned; not realized		
	SL	1934	race was planned; not realized		
"Hahnenkamm" course
—	SL	24 March 1935	(Austria) Siegfried Engl	(Austria) Edi Neubarth	(Austria) Sepp Klingler
"Ehrenbachhöhe" course
—	SL	8 March 1936	(Austria) Rudolph Matt	(Austria) Kurt Egert	(Austria) Edi Neubarth
"Ganslern" course
—	SL	20 March 1937	(Austria) Wilhelm Walch	(Switzerland) Hans Pfnür	(Austria) Markus Maier
	SL	1938	race was announced; then cancelled		
	SL	1939	no races during World War II period		
	SL	1940	no races during World War II period		
	SL	1941	no races during World War II period		
	SL	1942	no races during World War II period		
	SL	1943	no races during World War II period		
	SL	1944	no races during World War II period		
	SL	1945	no races during World War II period		
—	SL	10 March 1946	(Czechoslovakia) Antonín Šponar	(Austria) Karl Koller	(Austria) Toni Seelos
—	SL	9 March 1947	(Austria) Christian Pravda	(Austria) Engelbert Haider	(Austria) Eberhard Kneisl
—	SL	14 March 1948	(Austria) Thaddäus Schwabl	(Austria) Edi Mall	(Austria) Hellmut Lantschner
—	SL	6 March 1949	(Austria) Egon Schöpf	(Austria) Luis Seyrling	(Austria) Pepi Salvenmoser
—	SL	11 March 1950	(West Germany) Sepp Folger	(Austria) Fritz Huber	(Austria) Alois Zauner
—	SL	7–9 February 1951	(Austria) Christian Pravda	(Austria) Engelbert Haider	(Austria) Fritz Huber
	SL	1952	race was not in plan this year		
FIS–A
—	SL	18 January 1953	(Austria) Andreas Molterer	(Austria) Walter Schuster	(Switzerland) Martin Julen
—	GS	18 January 1953	(France) Guy de Huertas	(Austria) Andreas Molterer	(Switzerland) Martin Julen
"Vorderganslern" course; exceptionally no Hahnenkamm trophy awarded in 1954 (International Winter Sports III)
—	GS	22 January 1954	(Austria) Toni Spiß	(Norway) Stein Eriksen	(Austria) Christian Pravda
—	SL	24 January 1954	(Austria) Toni Spiß	(Switzerland) Georges Schneider	(Austria) Ernst Hinterseer
"Ganslern" course
—	SL	16 January 1955	(Austria) Toni Spiß	(Austria) Andreas Molterer	(Austria) Ernst Hinterseer
—	SL	15 January 1956	(Austria) Toni Sailer	(Austria) Josl Rieder	(West Germany) Sepp Behr
—	SL	20 January 1957	(Austria) Josl Rieder	(Austria) Ernst Hinterseer	(France) François Bonlieu
—	GS	17 January 1958	(Austria) Toni Sailer	(Austria) Ernst Hinterseer	(United States) Bud Werner
—	SL	19 January 1958	(Austria) Andreas Molterer	(Austria) Ernst Hinterseer	(France) Charles Bozon
—	SL	18 January 1959	(Austria) Andreas Molterer	(Austria) Egon Zimmermann	(Austria) Pepi Stiegler
—	GS	15 January 1960	(Austria) Karl Schranz	(West Germany) Hans Peter Lanig	(West Germany) Fritz Wagnerberger
—	SL	17 January 1960	(France) Adrien Duvillard	(Austria) Pepi Stiegler	(West Germany) Willy Bogner
—	SL	22 January 1961	(Austria) Gerhard Nenning	(France) Guy Périllat	(West Germany) Ludwig Leitner
—	SL	21 January 1962	(United States) Chuck Ferries	(France) Guy Périllat	(Austria) Pepi Stiegler
—	SL	20 January 1963	(West Germany) Ludwig Leitner	(France) Guy Périllat	(Switzerland) Adolf Mathis
	SL	1964	race was announced; then cancelled		
—	GS	22 January 1965	(Switzerland) Willy Favre	(France) Guy Périllat	(France) Jean-Claude Killy
—	SL	24 January 1965	(France) Jean-Claude Killy	(Austria) Karl Schranz	(Norway) Per Martin Sunde
—	SL	23 January 1966	(France) Jean-Claude Killy	(France) Jules Melquiond	(France) Guy Périllat
World Cup
7	SL	22 January 1967	(France) Jean-Claude Killy	(Sweden) Bengt-Erik Grahn	(France) Louis Jauffret
23	SL	21 January 1968	(Switzerland) Dumeng Giovanoli	(Austria) Alfred Matt	(France) Jean-Claude Killy
44	SL	19 January 1969	(France) Patrick Russel	(Austria) Herbert Huber	(Switzerland) Dumeng Giovanoli
68	GS	17 January 1970	(Switzerland) Dumeng Giovanoli	(Poland) Andrzej Bachleda	(Austria) Karl Schranz
69	SL	18 January 1970	(France) Patrick Russel	(Italy) Gustav Thöni	(France) Jean-Noël Augert
—	SL	23 January 1971	additional slalom race; did not count for classic Hahnenkamm		
98	SL	24 January 1971	(France) Jean-Noël Augert	(France) Alain Penz	(Austria) Harald Rofner
120	SL	16 January 1972	(France) Jean-Noël Augert	(Switzerland) Edmund Bruggmann	(Poland) Andrzej Bachleda
146	SL	28 January 1973	(France) Jean-Noël Augert	(Italy) Gustav Thöni	(Poland) Andrzej Bachleda
172	SL	27 January 1974	(Austria) Hansi Hinterseer	(Austria) Hans Kniewasser	(Italy) Gustav Thöni
190	SL	19 January 1975	(Italy) Piero Gros	(Sweden) Ingemar Stenmark	(Italy) Paolo De Chiesa
221	SL	24 January 1976	(Sweden) Ingemar Stenmark	(Italy) Gustav Thöni	(Italy) Piero Gros
241	SL	16 January 1977	(Sweden) Ingemar Stenmark	(Italy) Piero Gros	(Italy) Franco Bieler
276	SL	22 January 1978	(Austria) Klaus Heidegger	(Bulgaria) Petăr Popangelov	(Liechtenstein) Andreas Wenzel
301	SL	21 January 1979	(West Germany) Christian Neureuther	(Sweden) Ingemar Stenmark	(United States) Phil Mahre
329	SL	13 January 1980	(Liechtenstein) Andreas Wenzel	(West Germany) Christian Neureuther	(Switzerland) Jacques Lüthy
361	SL	18 January 1981	(Sweden) Ingemar Stenmark	(Soviet Union) Vladimir Andreyev	(Austria) Christian Orlainsky
395	SL	17 January 1982	(Sweden) Ingemar Stenmark	(United States) Phil Mahre	(Italy) Paolo De Chiesa (United States) Steve Mahre
429	SL	23 January 1983	(Sweden) Ingemar Stenmark	(Austria) Christian Orlainsky	(United States) Phil Mahre
469	SL	22 January 1984	(Luxembourg) Marc Girardelli	(Austria) Franz Gruber	(Socialist Federal Republic of Yugoslavia) Bojan Križaj
503	SL	13 January 1985	(Luxembourg) Marc Girardelli	(Italy) Oswald Tötsch	(Socialist Federal Republic of Yugoslavia) Bojan Križaj
539	SL	19 January 1986	(Liechtenstein) Paul Frommelt	(Sweden) Ingemar Stenmark	(Austria) Dietmar Köhlbichler (Liechtenstein) Andreas Wenzel
591	SL	25 January 1987	(Socialist Federal Republic of Yugoslavia) Bojan Križaj	(Austria) Mathias Berthold	(West Germany) Armin Bittner
	SL	17 January 1988	lack of snow; replaced in Bad Kleinkirchheim on the same date		
648	SL	15 January 1989	(West Germany) Armin Bittner	(Italy) Alberto Tomba	(Austria) Rudolf Nierlich
681	SL	21 January 1990	(Austria) Rudolf Nierlich	(Norway) Ole Kristian Furuseth	(West Germany) Armin Bittner
712	SL	13 January 1991	(Luxembourg) Marc Girardelli	(Norway) Ole Kristian Furuseth	(Austria) Rudolf Nierlich
744	SL	19 January 1992	(Italy) Alberto Tomba	(France) Patrice Bianchi	(Germany) Armin Bittner
	SL	17 January 1993	lack of snow; replaced in Lech am Arlberg on the same date		
811	SL	16 January 1994	(Austria) Thomas Stangassinger	(Austria) Thomas Sykora	(Italy) Alberto Tomba
843	SL	15 January 1995	(Italy) Alberto Tomba	(Slovenia) Jure Košir	(Norway) Ole Kristian Furuseth
879	SL	14 January 1996	(Austria) Thomas Sykora	(Italy) Alberto Tomba	(Slovenia) Jure Košir
918	SL	26 January 1997	(Austria) Mario Reiter	(Italy) Alberto Tomba	(Norway) Finn Christian Jagge
"Vorderganslern - Streif Finish" course
958	SL	25 January 1998	(Austria) Thomas Stangassinger	(Austria) Thomas Sykora	(Norway) Ole Kristian Furuseth
960	SL	26 January 1998	(Austria) Thomas Sykora	(Norway) Hans Petter Buraas	(Austria) Thomas Stangassinger
"Ganslern" course
994	SL	24 January 1999	(Slovenia) Jure Košir	(France) Didier Plaschy	(Italy) Giorgio Rocca
1025	SL	23 January 2000	(Austria) Mario Matt	(Slovenia) Matjaž Vrhovnik	(Austria) Benjamin Raich
1064	SL	21 January 2001	(Austria) Benjamin Raich	(Slovenia) Jure Košir	(Norway) Hans Petter Buraas
1100	SL	20 January 2002	(Austria) Rainer Schönfelder	(Austria) Kilian Albrecht	(United States) Bode Miller
1137	SL	26 January 2003	(Finland) Kalle Palander	(Austria) Rainer Schönfelder	(Austria) Heinz Schilchegger
1172	SL	25 January 2004	(Finland) Kalle Palander	(Canada) Thomas Grandi	(Austria) Rainer Schönfelder
1211	SL	23 January 2005	(Austria) Manfred Pranger	(Austria) Mario Matt	(Croatia) Ivica Kostelić
1248	SL	22 January 2006	(France) Jean-Pierre Vidal	(Austria) Reinfried Herbst	(Austria) Benjamin Raich
"Vorderganslern - Streif Finish" course
1283	SL	27 January 2007	(Sweden) Jens Byggmark	(Austria) Mario Matt	(Germany) Alois Vogl
1284	SL	28 January 2007	(Sweden) Jens Byggmark	(Austria) Mario Matt	(Italy) Manfred Mölgg
1320	SL	20 January 2008	(France) Jean-Baptiste Grange	(Sweden) Jens Byggmark	(Austria) Mario Matt
"Ganslern" course
1360	SL	25 January 2009	(France) Julien Lizeroux	(France) Jean-Baptiste Grange	(Italy) Patrick Thaler
1396	SL	24 January 2010	(Germany) Felix Neureuther	(France) Julien Lizeroux	(Italy) Giuliano Razzoli
1428	SL	23 January 2011	(France) Jean-Baptiste Grange	(Croatia) Ivica Kostelić	(Italy) Giuliano Razzoli
1464	SL	22 January 2012	(Italy) Cristian Deville	(Austria) Mario Matt	(Croatia) Ivica Kostelić
1511	SL	27 January 2013	(Austria) Marcel Hirscher	(Germany) Felix Neureuther	(Croatia) Ivica Kostelić
1541	SL	24 January 2014	(Germany) Felix Neureuther	(Norway) Henrik Kristoffersen	(Italy) Patrick Thaler
1579	SL	25 January 2015	(Sweden) Mattias Hargin	(Austria) Marcel Hirscher	(Germany) Felix Neureuther
1615	SL	24 January 2016	(Norway) Henrik Kristoffersen	(Austria) Marcel Hirscher	(Germany) Fritz Dopfer
1658	SL	22 January 2017	(Austria) Marcel Hirscher	(United Kingdom) Dave Ryding	(Russia) Aleksandr Khoroshilov
1697	SL	21 January 2018	(Norway) Henrik Kristoffersen	(Austria) Marcel Hirscher	(Switzerland) Daniel Yule
1733	SL	26 January 2019	(France) Clément Noël	(Austria) Marcel Hirscher	(France) Alexis Pinturault
1770	SL	26 January 2020	(Switzerland) Daniel Yule	(Austria) Marco Schwarz	(France) Clément Noël
	SL	24 January 2021	COVID-19 pandemic; replaced in Flachau on 17 January 2021		
1840	SL	22 January 2022	(United Kingdom) Dave Ryding	(Norway) Lucas Braathen	(Norway) Henrik Kristoffersen
1877	SL	22 January 2023	(Switzerland) Daniel Yule	(United Kingdom) Dave Ryding	(Norway) Lucas Braathen
1911	SL	21 January 2024	(Germany) Linus Strasser	(Sweden) Kristoffer Jakobsen	(Switzerland) Daniel Yule
1950	SL	26 January 2025	(France) Clément Noël	(Italy) Alex Vinatzer	(Brazil) Lucas Pinheiro Braathen
1989	SL	25 January 2026	(Austria) Manuel Feller	(Switzerland) Loïc Meillard	(Germany) Linus Straßer

Not part of classic Hahnenkamm Races. Replaced Madonna di Campiglio (1998), Wengen (2007).
GS in 1950s and 1960s didn't count for Hahnenkamm combined. And in 1970 did together with SL (dowhnill cancelled)

=== Women ===
Type	Year	Winner
International Hahnenkamm Races
"Ehrenbachhöhe" course
SL	1932	(Austria) Rini Andretta
"Hahnenkamm" course
SL	1935	(Netherlands) Gratia Schimmelpenninck
"Ehrenbachhöhe" course
SL	1936	(Austria) Grete Weikert
"Ganslern" course
SL	1937	(Nazi Germany) Lisa Resch
SL	1946	(Austria) Anneliese Schuh-Proxauf
SL	1947	(Austria) Gundl Baur
SL	1948	(Austria) Sophie Nogler
SL	1949	(Austria) Resi Hammerer
SL	1950	(West Germany) Hannelore Glaser-Franke
SL	1951	(United States) Andrea Mead Lawrence
FIS–A
GS	1953	(France) Lucienne Schmidt-Couttet
SL	1953	(Austria) Trude Klecker
GS	1954	(West Germany) Mirl Buchner
SL	1954	(Austria) Regina Schöpf
SL	1955	(Austria) Putzi Frandl
SL	1956	(Norway) Astrid Sandvik
SL	1957	(Austria) Putzi Frandl
GS	1958	(Switzerland) Annemarie Waser
SL	1958	(Switzerland) Renée Colliard
SL	1959	(Switzerland) Annemarie Waser
GS	1960	(France) Thérèse Leduc
SL	1960	(United States) Linda Meyers
SL	1961	(Austria) Traudl Hecher

== Course ==
The slope has numerous changes of terrain and lies at an oblique angle making it one of, if not the hardest and most challenging slalom course in the World Cup, located next to the final straight of the Streif.

It has its own finishing arena. The name "Ganslernhang" comes from a farmstead that stood there until 1993 and took its name from a stream, the Gänsbach, which flowed past it.

In 2009, before relatively short course, was lengthened by moving start higher up in the hill, at the same time new lift was built, with more comfortable standing area.

== Club5+ ==
In 1986, elite Club5 was originally founded by prestigious classic downhill organizers: Kitzbühel, Wengen, Garmisch, Val d’Isère, and Val Gardena/Gröden, with goal to bring alpine ski sport on the highest levels possible.

Later over the years other classic longterm organizers joined the now named Club5+: Alta Badia, Cortina, Kranjska Gora, Maribor, Lake Louise, Schladming, Adelboden, Kvitfjell, St. Moritz, and Åre.
