= Austria at the 1960 Winter Olympics =

- IOC code: AUT
- NOC: Austrian Olympic Committee
- Website: www.olympia.at (in German)

in Squaw Valley
- Competitors: 26 (17 men, 9 women) in 5 sports
- Flag bearer: Norbert Felsinger (figure skating)
- Medals Ranked 9th: Gold 1 Silver 2 Bronze 3 Total 6

Winter Olympics appearances (overview)
- 1924; 1928; 1932; 1936; 1948; 1952; 1956; 1960; 1964; 1968; 1972; 1976; 1980; 1984; 1988; 1992; 1994; 1998; 2002; 2006; 2010; 2014; 2018; 2022; 2026

Austria participated at the 1960 Winter Olympics in Squaw Valley, United States, held between 18 and 28 February 1960. The country's participation in the Games marked its eighth appearance at the Winter Olympics since its debut in the 1924 Games.

The Austrian team consisted of 26 athletes including nine women who competed across five sports. Skater Norbert Felsinger was the country's flag-bearer during the opening ceremony. Austria was ranked ninth in the overall medal table with six medals including one gold, two silver, and three bronze.

== Background ==
There were several organizations that were forerunners of the Austrian Olympic Committee including temporary committees during the early years of the Olympic Games. In 1908, Zentrales Sportkomitee was founded as the first National Olympic Committee of Austria. The organization wen through several changes, and renaming before being established as the Austrian Olympic Committee (Österreichisches Olympisches Comité) in June 1935. It was briefly merged with the German Olympic Committee from 1938 to 1946 before being restored in December 1946. The nation made its debut in the Winter Olympics at the first Games held in 1924 held in Chamonix, France. This edition of the Games marked the nation's eighth appearance at the Winter Games.

The 1960 Winter Olympics were held in Squaw Valley, United States between 18 and 28 February 1960. The Austrian delegation consisted of 26 athletes competing across five sports. Skater Norbert Felsinger was the country's flag-bearer in the Parade of Nations during the opening ceremony.

== Medalists ==
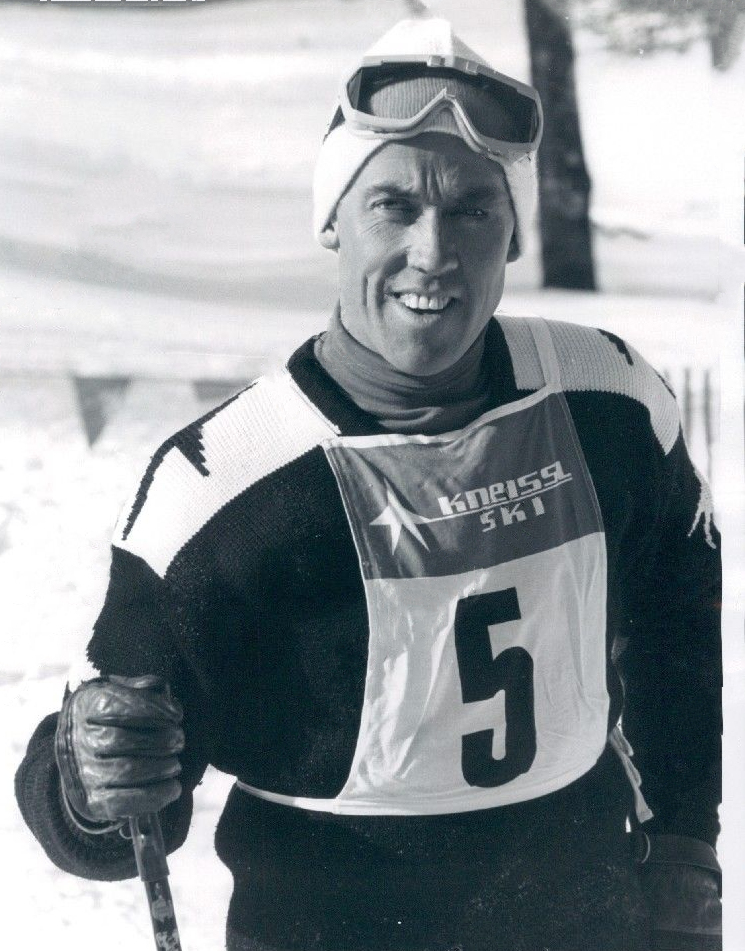
Ernst Hinterseer won a gold and a bronze medal in Alpine skiing

Austria was ranked ninth in the overall medal table with six medals including one gold, two silver, and three bronze.

Medal	Name	Sport	Event
Gold	Ernst Hinterseer	Alpine skiing	Men's slalom
Silver	Pepi Stiegler	Alpine skiing	Men's giant slalom
Silver	Hias Leitner	Alpine skiing	Men's slalom
Bronze	Ernst Hinterseer	Alpine skiing	Men's giant slalom
Bronze	Traudl Hecher	Alpine skiing	Women's downhill
Bronze	Otto Leodolter	Ski jumping	Men's normal hill

== Competitors ==
There were 26 athletes including nine women who took part in the medal events across five sports.

Sport	Men	Women	Athletes
Alpine skiing	7	6	13
Figure skating	4	3	7
Nordic combined	1	0	1
Ski jumping	4	0	4
Speed skating	2	0	2
Total	17	9	26 (Note: Overall count will not add upto the individual tally as there are athletes who competed in multiple sports.)

== Alpine skiing ==
Alpine skiing at the 1960 Winter Olympics took place at Squaw Valley Ski Resort and consisted of six events. Austria entered 13 competitors across six events. Ernst Hinterseer won a gold and bronze in the men's slalom and giant slalom events respectively. Pepi Stiegler and Hias Leitner won silver medals in the men's giant slalom and slalom competitions respectively. Traudl Hecher won bronze in the women's downhill event.

Men

Athlete	Event	Race 1		Race 2		Total	
Athlete	Event	Time	Rank	Time	Rank	Time	Rank
Anderl Molterer	Downhill	—N/a				2:15.1	19
Pepi Stiegler	Downhill	—N/a				2:13.1	15
Egon Zimmermann	Downhill	—N/a				2:09.8	10
Karl Schranz	Downhill	—N/a				2:09.2	7
Anderl Molterer	Giant Slalom	—N/a				1:51.6	12
Karl Schranz	Giant Slalom	—N/a				1:50.8	7
Ernst Hinterseer	Giant Slalom	—N/a				1:49.1	3rd place, bronze medalist(s)
Pepi Stiegler	Giant Slalom	—N/a				1:48.7	2nd place, silver medalist(s)
Ernst Oberaigner	Slalom	DSQ	–	—N/a		DSQ	–
Pepi Stiegler	Slalom	1:11.5	10	59.6	3	2:11.1	5
Hias Leitner	Slalom	1:11.1	9	59.2	2	2:10.3	2nd place, silver medalist(s)
Ernst Hinterseer	Slalom	1:10.7	5	58.2	1	2:08.9	1st place, gold medalist(s)

Women

Athlete	Event	Race 1		Race 2		Total	
Athlete	Event	Time	Rank	Time	Rank	Time	Rank
Herlinde Beutlhauser	Downhill	—N/a				DSQ	–
Putzi Frandl	Downhill	—N/a				2:11.6	39
Erika Netzer	Downhill	—N/a				1:41.1	8
Traudl Hecher	Downhill	—N/a				1:38.9	3rd place, bronze medalist(s)
Erika Netzer	Giant Slalom	—N/a				DSQ	–
Traudl Hecher	Giant Slalom	—N/a				1:46.7	25
Putzi Frandl	Giant Slalom	—N/a				1:45.7	21
Hilde Hofherr	Giant Slalom	—N/a				1:41.9	9
Putzi Frandl	Slalom	59.2	16	1:03.8	23	2:03.0	16
Hilde Hofherr	Slalom	59.0	14	59.0	5	1:58.0	5
Traudl Hecher	Slalom	58.6	11	DSQ	–	DSQ	–
Marianne Jahn-Nutt	Slalom	55.5	2	DSQ	–	DSQ	–

== Figure skating ==
Figure skating competitions were held between 19 and 26 February at Blyth Memorial Arena. Austria entered seven athletes across three categories in the competition. While the team achieved three top ten finishes across the women's and pair categories, it did not win a medal.

Men

Athlete	CF	FS	Points	Places	Rank
Norbert Felsinger	6	DNF	–	–	DNF
Peter Jonas	14	15	1213.2	115	13
Hubert Köpfler	12	14	1217.0	114	11

Women

Athlete	CF	FS	Points	Places	Rank
Karen Frohner	9	11	1266.0	99	9
Regine Heitzer	7	4	1327.9	58	7

Pairs

Athletes	Points	Places	Rank
Diana Hinko; Heinz Döpfl	69.8	54.5	8

== Nordic combined ==
The Nordic combined event consisted of ski jumping and 15 km (9.3 mi) cross-country skiing. It was held between 22 and 24 February at Olympic Jumping Hill. The lone participant Alois Leodolter was ranked 21st in the overall classification.

Athlete	Event	Ski Jumping				Cross-country			Total	
Athlete	Event	Distance 1	Distance 2	Points	Rank	Time	Points	Rank	Points	Rank
Alois Leodolter	Individual	60.5	62.5	205.5	14	1'06:21.9	209.484	25	414.984	21

== Ski jumping ==
Ski jumping event was held on 21 February at Olympic Jumping Hill. Austria had four entrants to the competition. Otto Leodolter won the bronze medal in the event with a combined score of 219.4.

Men

Athlete	Event	Jump 1			Jump 2			Total	
Athlete	Event	Distance	Points	Rank	Distance	Points	Rank	Points	Rank
Willi Egger	Normal hill	78.5	88.1	37	76.0	97.3	28	185.4	34
Walter Steinegger	Normal hill	87.5	103.3	14	79.5	102.6	16	205.9	16
Alwin Plank	Normal hill	87.5	105.3	10	75.5	101.4	22	206.7	14
Otto Leodolter	Normal hill	88.5	107.6	6	83.5	111.8	2	219.4	3rd place, bronze medalist(s)

== Speed skating ==
Speed skating events were held at the Speed Skating Oval. Franz Offenberger and Hermann Strutz competed across four events in the competition, but failed to win a medal.

Men

Event	Athlete	Race	
Event	Athlete	Time	Rank
500 m	Franz Offenberger	43.0	29
500 m	Hermann Strutz	44.4	40
1500 m	Franz Offenberger	DNF	–
1500 m	Hermann Strutz	2:19.4	24
5000 m	Franz Offenberger	8:38.2	29
5000 m	Hermann Strutz	8:21.9	18
10000 m	Hermann Strutz	17:06.5	19
