= Austrian Alpine Ski Championships 1959 =

The 1959 Austrian Alpine Ski Championships (Österreichischen Alpinen Skimeisterschaften 1959) took place from 27 February to 1 March in Kitzbühel.

== Men ==
=== Downhill ===
Place	Name	Time
1	Mathias Leitner	2:31.3 min
2	Egon Zimmermann	2:32.0 min
3	Pepi Gramshammer	2:34.1 min
4	Josef Stiegler	2:34.2 min
5	Ernst Hinterseer	2:34.4 min
6	Toni Mark	2:35.1 min
	Kurt Pair]	2:35.1 min
8	Helmut Schaller	2:36.6 min
9	Ernst Oberaigner	2:37.0 min
10	Franz Tritscher	2:38.5 min

- Date: 28 February 1959
- Place: Kitzbühel
- Piste: Streif
- Run length: 3,600 m
- Gates: 17

=== Giant slalom ===
Place	Name	Time
1	Mathias Leitner	1:30.1 min
2	Andreas Molterer	1:30.7 min
	Ernst Hinterseer	1:30.7 min
4	Toni Mark	1:30.8 min
5	Josef Rieder	1:31.4 min
6	Egon Zimmermann	1:31.9 min
7	Pepi Gramshammer	1:32.0 min
8	Josef Stiegler	1:32.4 min
9	Otto Wiedmann	1:33.1 min
10	Helmut Schaller	1:33.2 min

- Date: 27 February 1959
- Place: Kitzbühel
- Piste: Hausberg

=== Slalom ===
Place	Name	Time
1	Andreas Molterer	2:18.0 min
2	Toni Mark	2:20.4 min
3	Ernst Oberaigner	2:22.7 min

- Date: 1 March 1959
- Place: Kitzbühel
- Piste: Ganslernhang

=== Combination ===
The combination combines the results of the slalom, giant slalom and downhill.

Place	Name	Points
1	Toni Mark	4.30
2	Josef Stiegler	6.97
3	Mathias Leitner	8.44
4	Ernst Hinterseer	9.01
5	Ernst Oberaigner	12.85

== Ladies ==
=== Downhill ===
Place	Name	time
1	Erika Netzer	2:13.5 min
2	Grete Haslauer	2:17.3 min
3	Hilde Hofherr	2:18.2 min
	Herlinde Beutlhauser	2:18.2 min
5	Christl Staffner	2:19.1 min
6	Kathi Hörl	2:20.1 min
7	Helga Hanel	2:21.1 min
8	Helga Herdy	2:23.8 min

- Date: 28 February 1959
- Place: Kitzbühel
- Piste: Seidlalm

=== Giant slalom ===
Place	Name	Time
1	Grete Haslauer	1:17.7 min
2	Hilde Hofherr	1:18.1 min
3	Helga Hanel	1:18.7 min
4	Kathi Hörl	1:19.5 min
5	Erika Netzer	1:20.2 min
6	Herlinde Beutlhauser	1:20.3 min
7	Christl Machek	1:21.5 min
8	Christl Staffner	1:22.1 min
9	Rosl Pfeiffer	1:22.5 min

- Date: 27 February 1959
- Place: Kitzbühel

=== Slalom ===
Place	Name	Time
1	Erika Netzer	1:31.7 min
2	Helga Hanel	1:34.7 min
3	Christl Machek	1:35.7 min

- Date: 1 March 1959
- Place: Kitzbühel

=== Combination ===
The combination combines the results of the slalom, giant slalom and downhill.

Place	Name	Points
1	Erika Netzer	2.63
2	Grete Haslauer	8.11
3	Helga Hanel	8.91
4	Hilde Hofherr	10.30
5	Kathi Hörl	10.94
