= FIS Alpine World Ski Championships 1954 =

Skiing event in Åre, Sweden

Coordinates: 63.415°N 13.062°E

- Host city: Åre
- Country: Sweden
- Events: 8
- Opening: 28 February 1954
- Closing: 7 March 1954
- Opened by: Gustaf VI Adolf

Location in Europe

The FIS Alpine World Ski Championships 1954 were held in Åre, Sweden, from 28 February to 7 March.

Olympic champion Stein Eriksen of Norway won three gold medals and was eighth in the downhill. The combined event returned as a "paper race" (through 1980), based on the best average finish in all three events, all of which had to be completed.

The World Championships returned to Åre in 2007 and 2019.

== Men's competitions ==
Location in Sweden

=== Downhill ===
Sunday, 7 March 1954

Place	Country	Athlete
1	Austria (AUT)	Christian Pravda
2	Austria (AUT)	Martin Strolz
3	Austria (AUT)	Ernst Obereigner

=== Giant slalom ===
Wednesday, 3 March 1954

Place	Country	Athlete
1	Norway (NOR)	Stein Eriksen
2	France (FRA)	François Bonlieu
3	Austria (AUT)	Anderl Molterer

=== Slalom ===
Sunday, 28 February 1954

Place	Country	Athlete
1	Norway (NOR)	Stein Eriksen
2	West Germany (FRG)	Beni Obermüller
3	Austria (AUT)	Toni Spiß

=== Combination ===
Place	Country	Athlete
1	Norway (NOR)	Stein Eriksen
2	Austria (AUT)	Christian Pravda
3	Sweden (SWE)	Stig Sollander

== Women's competitions ==
=== Downhill ===
Monday, 1 March 1954

Place	Country	Athlete
1	Switzerland (SUI)	Ida Schöpfer
2	Austria (AUT)	Trude Klecker
3	France (FRA)	Lucienne Schmith

=== Giant slalom ===
Thursday, 4 March 1954

Place	Country	Athlete
1	France (FRA)	Lucienne Schmith
2	Switzerland (SUI)	Madeleine Berthod
3	United States (USA)	Jannette Burr

=== Slalom ===
Saturday, 6 March 1954

Place	Country	Athlete
1	Austria (AUT)	Trude Klecker
2	Switzerland (SUI)	Ida Schöpfer
3	Sweden (SWE)	Sarah Thomasson

=== Combination ===
Place	Country	Athlete
1	Switzerland (SUI)	Ida Schöpfer
2	Switzerland (SUI)	Madeleine Berthod
3	France (FRA)	Lucienne Schmith

== Medals table ==
Place	Nation	Gold	Silver	Bronze	Total
1	Norway (NOR)	3	-	-	3
2	Austria (AUT)	2	3	3	8
3	Switzerland (SUI)	2	3	-	5
4	France (FRA)	1	1	2	4
5	West Germany (FRG)	-	1	-	1
6	Sweden (SWE)	-	-	2	2
7	United States (USA)	-	-	1	1
