= Molterer =

Molterer is an Austrian surname. Notable people with the surname include:

- Anderl Molterer (1931–2023), Austrian skier
- Wilhelm Molterer (born 1955), Austrian politician
