= Thomas Hauser (disambiguation) =

Thomas Hauser (born 1946) is an American author.

Thomas Hauser may also refer to:

- Thomas Hauser (alpine skier) (born 1953), Austrian former alpine skier
- Thomas Hauser (footballer) (born 1965), German retired football player
