= Hinterseer =

Hinterseer is a surname. Notable people with the surname include:

- Ernst Hinterseer (born 1932), Austrian alpine skier
- Guido Hinterseer (born 1964), Austrian alpine skier
- Hansi Hinterseer (born 1954), Austrian singer, actor, and alpine skier
- Lukas Hinterseer (born 1991), Austrian footballer
