= Kurt Engl =

Austrian alpine skier

Kurt Engl is a retired Austrian alpine skier.

He won the bronze medal in slalom at the 1998 Junior World Championships, and then the silver medal in both slalom and downhill at the 1999 Junior World Championships.

He made his World Cup debut in January 2000 in Wengen. Several years later he collected his first World Cup points, finishing 12th in a Kitzbühel slalom in January 2003. His career best was a 5th place in February 2004 in St. Anton, remaining a consistent top-20 finisher throughout his career. He only finished below the top 20 once, albeit failing to finish several races as well. He also competed at the 2005 World Championships without finishing there either. His last World Cup outing came in January 2008 in Kitzbühel.
