= Stefan Niederseer =

Austrian alpine skier (born 1962)

Stefan Niederseer (born 29 September 1962 in Saalbach-Hinterglemm) is an Austrian former alpine skier. He won the Men's Downhill at the 1985 Austrian Alpine Ski Championships.
