= Karin Köllerer =

Austrian alpine skier

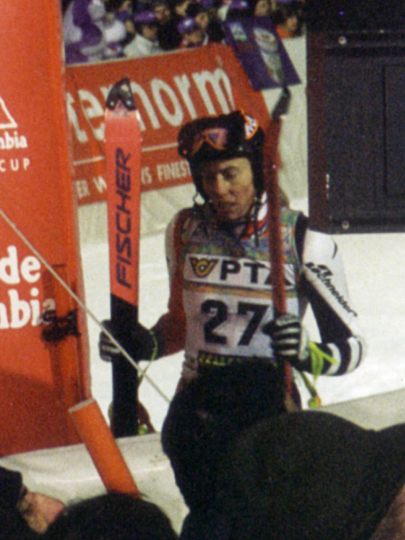
- Köllerer in 1998

Personal information
- Born: 8 October 1970 (age 55) Kuchl, Austria
- Height: 1.74 m (5 ft 9 in)

Skiing career
- Sport: Alpine skiing
- Club: SC Kuchl
- Retired: 2002
- Disciplines: Technical events
- World Cup debut: 1989

World Championships
- Teams: 4

World Cup
- Seasons: 14
- Podiums: 4
Medal record
Women's alpine skiing
Representing Austria
World Cup race podiums
Event	1st	2nd	3rd
Slalom	0	2	2

Karin Köllerer (born 8 October 1970) is a former Austrian alpine skier who won the Europa Cup overall title in 1995.

== Career ==
During her career she has achieved 4 results among the top 3 in the World Cup.

== World Cup results ==
Top 3

Date	Place	Discipline	Rank
18-02-2001	(Germany) Garmisch-Partenkirchen	Slalom	3
14-01-2001	(Austria) Flachau	Slalom	2
29-12-1999	(Austria) Lienz	Slalom	3
28-03-1993	(Sweden) Are	Slalom	2

== Europa Cup results ==
Köllerer has won an overall Europa Cup and one discipline cup.

- FIS Alpine Ski Europa Cup
  - Overall: 1994–95 FIS Alpine Ski Europa Cup 1995
  - Super-G: 1990

== National titles ==
Köllerer has won five national championships at individual senior level.

- Austrian Alpine Ski Championships
  - Slalom: 1995, 1998, 2000 (3)
  - Combined: 1988, 1993 (2)
