= Alfons Walde =

Austrian artist and architect

Cover of a monography (ISBN 3702216413) showing the typical painting style of Walde

Alfons Walde (8 February 1891 – 11 December 1958) was an Austrian artist and architect.

== Art ==
Walde is known best for his winter landscapes and farming images, especially skiing and sporting scenes, painted in tempera or impastoed oil paint. Many of his paintings can be seen in the Museum gallery in Kitzbühel.

== Life and career ==
Walde was born in Oberndorf (near Kitzbühel) in Tyrol. He produced his first watercolour and tempera paintings during his school days. From 1910 to 1914 he studied architecture at the Technische Hochschule in Vienna, while continuing his education as a painter. In the Danubian metropolis he moved in artistic circles that included Egon Schiele and Gustav Klimt, and he became influenced by Ferdinand Hodler.

In 1911 Walde had his first exhibition in Innsbruck, and in 1913 presented four farm pictures at the prestigious Vienna Secession exhibition. From 1914 to 1917 he actively participated in World War I as a Tyrolean Kaiserschütze in the high mountains. After returning to Kitzbühel, he fully devoted himself to painting and participated again in exhibitions of the Secession and the Vienna Künstlerhaus throughout the 1920s. He was active as a graphic artist, and beginning in 1926 designed many posters.

By around 1928 Walde had finally found his own characteristic style, one that gave expression to both the Tyrolean mountain scenery – particularly the living winter landscapes – and its robust people through the use of highly reduced drawings and pastel colouring. Throughout the rest of his artistic career his work stayed with the subject of his homeland, and retained the same distinct native style.

Alfons Walde died of heart failure on 11 December 1958 in Kitzbühel.
