= Guido Hinterseer =

Austrian alpine skier (born 1964)

Personal information
- Born: 7 May 1964 (age 62) Kitzbühel, Austria

Skiing career
- Sport: Alpine skiing
- Retired: 1988
- Disciplines: Technical events
- World Cup debut: 1982

World Cup
- Seasons: 7

Guido Hinterseer (born 7 May 1964) is an Austrian former alpine skier.

== World Cup results ==
Top 5

Date	Place	Discipline	Position
17-12-1984	(Italy) Madonna di Campiglio	Super G	5
23-01-1984	(Austria) Kirchberg	Giant Slalom	5
22-01-1984	(Austria) Kitzbühel	Combined	4
19-12-1983	(Italy) Val Gardena	Super G	5
