= Lucienne Schmidt-Couttet =

French alpine skier (1926–2022)

Medal record

Representing France

Women's Alpine skiing

World Championships
Gold medal – first place	1954 Åre	Giant slalom
Bronze medal – third place	1950 Aspen	Giant slalom
Bronze medal – third place	1954 Åre	Downhill
Bronze medal – third place	1954 Åre	Combined

Lucienne Schmidt-Couttet (27 November 1926 – 4 October 2022) was a French alpine skier and world champion, who competed in the 1948 Winter Olympics.

Schmidt received a gold medal at the 1954 World Championships in Åre, winning the giant slalom.

Schmidt-Couttet died on 4 October 2022, at the age of 95.
