= Annelore Zückert =

Austrian alpine skier (1925–2009)

Annelore Zückert (5 February 1925 – 29 September 2009) was an Austrian alpine skier who competed in the 1948 Winter Olympics.
