= Hias Leitner =

Austrian alpine skier (born 1935)

Medal record

Men's alpine skiing

Representing Austria

Olympic Games
Silver medal – second place	1960 Squaw Valley	Slalom

Matthias "Hias" Leitner (born 22 September 1935) is an Austrian former alpine skier.

He was born in Kitzbühel.

At the 1960 Winter Olympics in Squaw Valley, United States he won silver in the slalom competition. At the 1964 Winter Olympics in Innsbruck, Austria he ranked 21st in the slalom competition. In 1966, 1967, and 1968 he won the Alpine skiing professional ski racing circuit.
