= Hermann Strutz =

Austrian speed skater

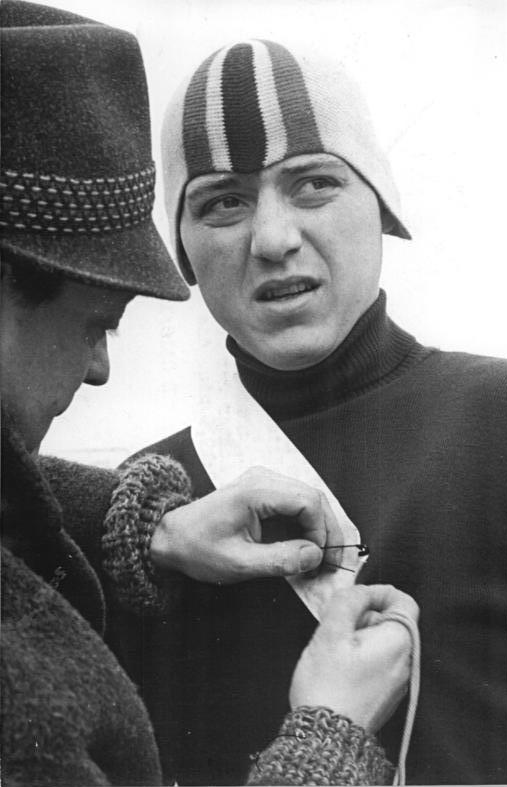
- Hermann Strutz in 1963

Personal information
- Nationality: Austrian
- Born: 2 December 1938 (age 86); Trautmannsdorf in Oststeiermark, Nazi Germany

Sport
- Sport: Speed skating

Hermann Strutz (born 2 December 1938) is an Austrian speed skater. He competed at the 1960 Winter Olympics, the 1964 Winter Olympics and the 1968 Winter Olympics.
