= Christine Sponring =

Austrian alpine skier (born 1983)

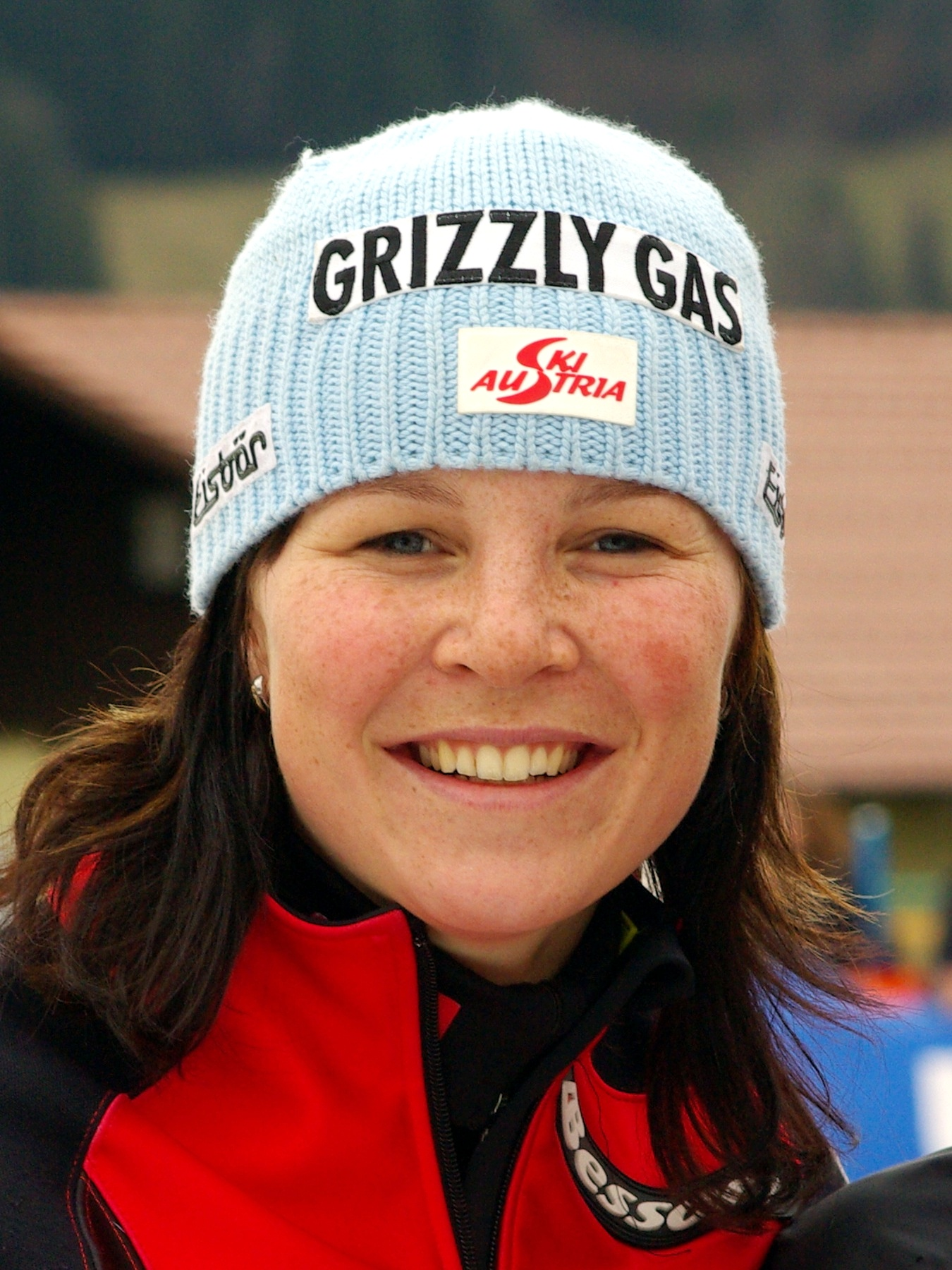
Christine Sponring in 2008

Christine Sponring (born 22 June 1983 in Schwaz) is an Austrian former alpine skier who competed in the 2002 Winter Olympics.
