= Egon Schöpf =

Austrian alpine skier

Egon Schöpf (born 16 October 1925) is an Austrian alpine skier who competed in the 1948 Winter Olympics and in the 1952 Winter Olympics. He was born in Innsbruck the capital of Tyrol. In 1948 he finished fifth in the alpine skiing downhill event and sixth in the alpine skiing slalom competition. Four years later he participated in the 1952 downhill event and in the giant slalom competition but he was not able to finish one of these races.
