= Kitzbühel =

Town in Tyrol, Austria

Kitzbühel Kitzbiché (Bavarian)
- Municipality
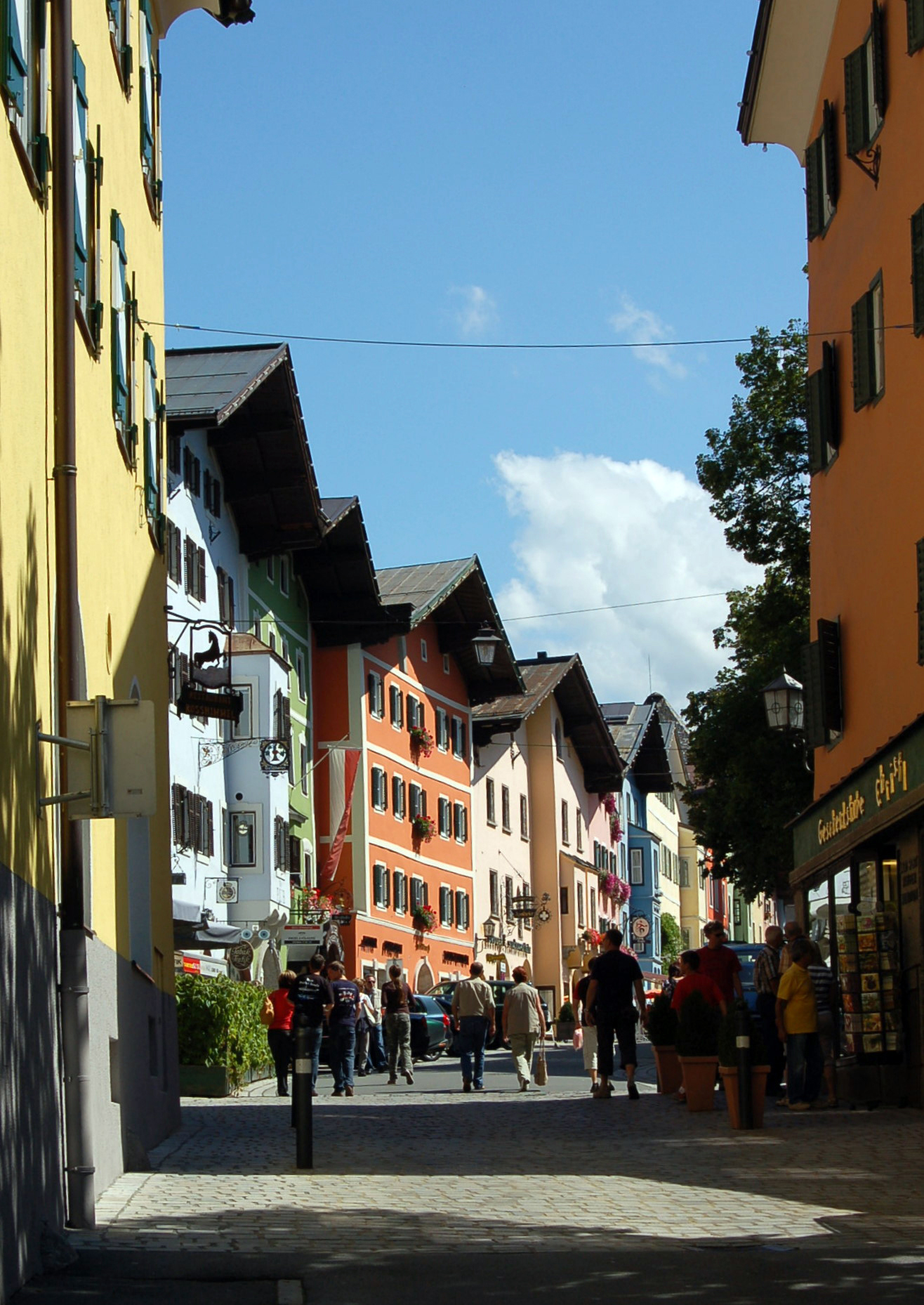
- Kitzbühel in mid-August 2008

- Flag Coat of arms

- Location within Austria Kitzbühel (Tyrol, Austria)
- Coordinates: 47°26′47″N 12°23′31″E
- Country: Austria
- State: Tyrol
- District: Kitzbühel

Government
  - Mayor: Klaus Winkler (ÖVP)

Area
  - Total: 58.01 km^{2} (22.40 sq mi)
- Elevation: 762 m (2,500 ft)

Population (2018-01-01)
  - Total: 8,272
  - Density: 142.6/km^{2} (369.3/sq mi)
- Time zone: UTC+1 (CET)
  - Summer (DST): UTC+2 (CEST)
- Postal code: 6370
- Area code: 05356
- Vehicle registration: KB
- Website: Kitzbühel

Kitzbühel (German: [ˈkɪtsbyːl] or [ˈkɪtsbyːəl]; Bavarian: Kitzbiché [ˈkxɪtspɪxɪ]) is a medieval town situated in the Kitzbühel Alps along the river Kitzbüheler Ache in Tyrol, Austria, about 100 km (62 mi) east of the state capital Innsbruck, and is the administrative centre of the Kitzbühel District (Bezirk). Kitzbühel is one of the most famous and exclusive ski resorts in the world and is frequented by the international high society. The world's hardest ski race Hahnenkamm Races is a yearly event that attracts the attention of ski fans around the world. Kitzbühel's real estate continuously ranks among the world's most expensive. The proximity to Munich has made it a preferred location for vacation homes among the German elite.

== Geography ==
Kitzbühel is situated in the Kitzbühel Alps between Zell am See and Innsbruck. It lies in the Leukental valley on the Kitzbüheler Ache river.

The town is subdivided into the municipalities of Am Horn, Aschbachbichl, Badhaussiedlung, Bichlach, Ecking, Felseneck, Griesenau, Griesenauweg, Gundhabing, Hagstein, Hausstatt, Henntal, Jodlfeld, Kaps, Mühlau, Obernau, Schattberg, Seereith, Siedlung Frieden, Am Sonnberg, Sonnenhoffeld, Staudach, Stockerdörfl and Zephirau.

The neighbouring municipalities are Aurach bei Kitzbühel, Jochberg, Kirchberg in Tirol, Oberndorf in Tirol, Reith bei Kitzbühel, St. Johann in Tirol and Fieberbrunn.

Kitzbühel's historic centre is mainly car-free and hosts a large selection of luxury shops, cafés and fine dining restaurants.

=== Climate ===
Kitzbühel

Climate chart (precipitation, max. and min. temperature)
J	F	M	A	M	J	J	A	S	O	N	D
71 1 −8	67 4 −6	85 9 −3	82 13 1	109 19 6	157 21 9	172 23 11	151 23 11	103 19 8	74 14 3	82 6 −2	83 2 −6
- █ Average max. and min. temperatures in °C
- █ Precipitation totals in mm
- Source: ZAMG
Imperial conversion
J	F	M	A	M	J	J	A	S	O	N	D
2.8 34 18	2.6 39 21	3.3 48 27	3.2 55 34	4.3 66 43	6.2 70 48	6.8 73 52	5.9 73 52	4.1 66 46	2.9 57 37	3.2 43 28	3.3 36 21
- █ Average max. and min. temperatures in °F
- █ Precipitation totals in inches

Climate data for Kitzbühel (1971–2000)
Month	Jan	Feb	Mar	Apr	May	Jun	Jul	Aug	Sep	Oct	Nov	Dec	Year
Record high °C (°F)	12.1 (53.8)	16.0 (60.8)	22.5 (72.5)	27.6 (81.7)	30.0 (86.0)	34.6 (94.3)	36.3 (97.3)	34.8 (94.6)	29.9 (85.8)	25.0 (77.0)	20.4 (68.7)	15.6 (60.1)	36.3 (97.3)
Mean daily maximum °C (°F)	1.3 (34.3)	4.0 (39.2)	8.7 (47.7)	13.1 (55.6)	18.8 (65.8)	20.7 (69.3)	23.2 (73.8)	23.3 (73.9)	19.4 (66.9)	14.1 (57.4)	6.1 (43.0)	1.8 (35.2)	12.9 (55.2)
Daily mean °C (°F)	−4.1 (24.6)	−2.3 (27.9)	1.9 (35.4)	6.3 (43.3)	11.6 (52.9)	14.4 (57.9)	16.4 (61.5)	16.1 (61.0)	12.1 (53.8)	7.1 (44.8)	0.9 (33.6)	−2.8 (27.0)	6.5 (43.7)
Mean daily minimum °C (°F)	−7.7 (18.1)	−6.3 (20.7)	−2.5 (27.5)	1.3 (34.3)	5.7 (42.3)	9.0 (48.2)	11.1 (52.0)	11.0 (51.8)	7.5 (45.5)	3.0 (37.4)	−2.3 (27.9)	−5.8 (21.6)	2.0 (35.6)
Record low °C (°F)	−25.0 (−13.0)	−21.0 (−5.8)	−27.2 (−17.0)	−11.6 (11.1)	−5.8 (21.6)	1.6 (34.9)	1.2 (34.2)	2.0 (35.6)	−3.4 (25.9)	−9.0 (15.8)	−18.0 (−0.4)	−20.6 (−5.1)	−27.2 (−17.0)
Average precipitation mm (inches)	70.7 (2.78)	66.7 (2.63)	85.2 (3.35)	82.3 (3.24)	109.2 (4.30)	157.2 (6.19)	172.0 (6.77)	150.7 (5.93)	102.8 (4.05)	73.6 (2.90)	81.5 (3.21)	83.2 (3.28)	1,235.1 (48.63)
Average snowfall cm (inches)	43.3 (17.0)	46.7 (18.4)	35.6 (14.0)	8.6 (3.4)	0.2 (0.1)	0.0 (0.0)	0.0 (0.0)	0.0 (0.0)	0.0 (0.0)	0.5 (0.2)	20.4 (8.0)	50.3 (19.8)	205.6 (80.9)
Average precipitation days (≥ 1.0 mm)	9.5	9.2	12.2	12.2	12.8	15.5	15.4	13.8	10.8	9.3	10.6	11.0	142.3
Average relative humidity (%) (at 14:00)	70.4	58.9	50.5	46.7	45.0	52.2	50.8	50.1	52.8	56.5	68.2	76.9	56.6
Source: Central Institute for Meteorology and Geodynamics

== History ==
=== Earliest people ===
The first known settlers were Illyrians mining copper in the hills around Kitzbühel between 1100 and 800 BC.

Around 15 BC, the Romans under Emperor Augustus extended their empire to include the Alps and established the province of Noricum. After the fall of the western Roman Empire, Bavarii settled in the Kitzbühel region around 800 and started clearing forests.

=== Middle Ages ===
In the 12th century, the name Chizbuhel is mentioned for the first time in a document belonging to the Chiemsee monastery (where it refers to a "Marquard von Chizbuhel"), whereby Chizzo relates to a Bavarian clan and Bühel refers to the location of a settlement upon a hill. One hundred years later a source refers to the Vogtei of the Bamberg monastery in Kicemgespuchel and, in the 1271 document elevating the settlement to the status of a town, the place is called Chizzingenspuehel.

Kitzbühel became part of Upper Bavaria in 1255 when Bavaria was first partitioned. Duke Ludwig II of Bavaria granted Kitzbühel town rights on 6 June 1271, and it was fortified with defensive town walls. During the next centuries the town established itself as a market town, growing steadily and remaining unaffected by war and conflict. The town walls were eventually reduced to the level of a single storey building, and the stone used to build residential housing.

Historical population
Year	Pop.	±%
1869	2,982	—
1880	3,167	+6.2%
1890	3,290	+3.9%
1900	3,453	+5.0%
1910	4,021	+16.4%
1923	4,378	+8.9%
1934	5,294	+20.9%
1939	5,419	+2.4%
1951	7,211	+33.1%
1961	7,744	+7.4%
1971	8,020	+3.6%
1981	7,840	−2.2%
1991	8,119	+3.6%
2001	8,574	+5.6%
2008	8,437	−1.6%
2011	8,207	−2.7%
2017	8,341	+1.6%
Source: Statistik Austria

When Countess Margarete of Tyrol married the Bavarian, Duke Louis V the Brandenburger, in 1342, Kitzbühel was temporarily united with the County of Tyrol (that in turn became a Bavarian dominion as a result of the marriage until Louis' death). After the Peace of Schärding (1369) Kitzbühel was returned to Bavaria. Following the division of Bavaria, Kufstein went to the Landshut line of the House of Wittelsbach. During this time, silver and copper mining in Kitzbühel expanded steadily and comprehensive mining rights were issued to her that, later, were to become significant to the Bavarian dukedom. On 30 June 1504 Kitzbühel became a part of Tyrol permanently: the Emperor Maximilian reserved to himself the hitherto Landshut offices (Ämter) of Kitzbühel, Kufstein and Rattenberg as a part of his Cologne Arbitration (Kölner Schiedsspruch), that had ended the Landshut War of Succession.

However, the law of Louis of Bavaria continued to apply to the three aforementioned places until the 19th century, so that these towns had a special legal status within Tyrol. Maximilian enfeoffed Kitzbühel, with the result that it came under the rule of the Counts of Lamberg at the end of the 16th century, until 1 May 1840, when Kitzbühel was ceremonially transferred to the state.

An inscription in the Swedish Chapel dating to the Swedish War states "Bis hierher und nicht weiter kamen die schwedischen Reiter" ("The Swedish knights came as far as here but no further").

=== 18th century to modern day ===
The wars of the 18th and 19th century bypassed the town, even though its inhabitants participated in the Tyrolean Rebellion against Napoleon. Following the Treaty of Pressburg in 1805, Kitzbühel once more became part of Bavaria; it was reunited with Tyrol after the fall of Napoleon at the Congress of Vienna. Until 1918, the town (named Kitzbichl before 1895) was part of the Austrian monarchy (Austria side after the compromise of 1867), head of the district of the same name, one of the 21 Bezirkshauptmannschaften in the Tyrol province.

When Emperor Franz Joseph finally resolved the confusing constitutional situation, and following completion of the Salzburg-Tyrol Railway in 1875, the town's trade and industry flourished. In 1894, Kitzbühel hosted its first ski race, ushering in a new era of tourism and sport.

In 1924 Alban Ernan Forbes Dennis, a British diplomat and spy, with his wife, the novelist Phyllis Bottome, started the Tennerhof school in Kitzbühel. Based on the teaching of languages, the school was intended to be a community and an educational laboratory to determine how psychology (specifically the theories of Alfred Adler) and educational theory could cure the ills of nations. Among the pupils were the future authors Ralph Arnold, Nigel Dennis, Ian Fleming and Cyril Connolly.

Kitzbühel was the town to host the remnants of the Nazi made Serbian collaborationist government the Government of National Salvation from 1944 to the end of the war. Kitzbühel also had the good fortune to remain undamaged from the ravages of the First and Second World Wars. Since the year 2000 the town has been a member of the Climate Alliance of Tyrol.

The town's demographic evolution between 1869 and 2017 is shown in the list to the right.

== Places of interest ==
- St. Catherine's Church: built 1360–1365, High Gothic church in the heart of the town with a coppersmith altar; the high tower with its spire is a striking landmark in the town centre. Its carillon sounds at 11 am and 5 pm.
- Protestant Christ's Church in Kitzbühel: built in 1962 by Clemens Holzmeister
- Reisch Dance Cafe: built in 1928 by Lois Welzenbacher (architect of the Tiroler Moderne); the Plahl Medical Practice (Arzthaus) was also designed by him
- Berghaus Holzmeister, a guesthouse on Kitzbühel's local mountain, the Hahnenkamm; built in 1930 by Clemens Holzmeister
- Berghaus by Alfons Walde, 100m away
- Fresco by Max Weiler (1951) in Kitzbühel Primary School (Volksschule)
- Newly built tri-cable system by the firm of Doppelmayr, the cable car with the highest elevation above the ground (400 metres (1,300 ft)) in the world.
- Museum Kitzbühel - Collection Alfons Walde: the new renovated museum presents the history of the town, from 1000 years ago to the winter sports era; it also includes a larger permanent exhibition of the Tyrolean painter Alfons Walde.

== Notable people ==
In the 1950s, local celebrities like Ernst Hinterseer, Hias Leitner, Anderl Molterer, Christian Pravda, Fritz Huber Jr. and Toni Sailer are known for their skill in skiing. A more recent generation of Kitzbühel celebreties include names such as: Rosi Schipflinger, Axel Naglich, Kaspar Frauenschuh, and David Kreiner. Along with sporting achievements, fashion, and food, they are known for representing the city.

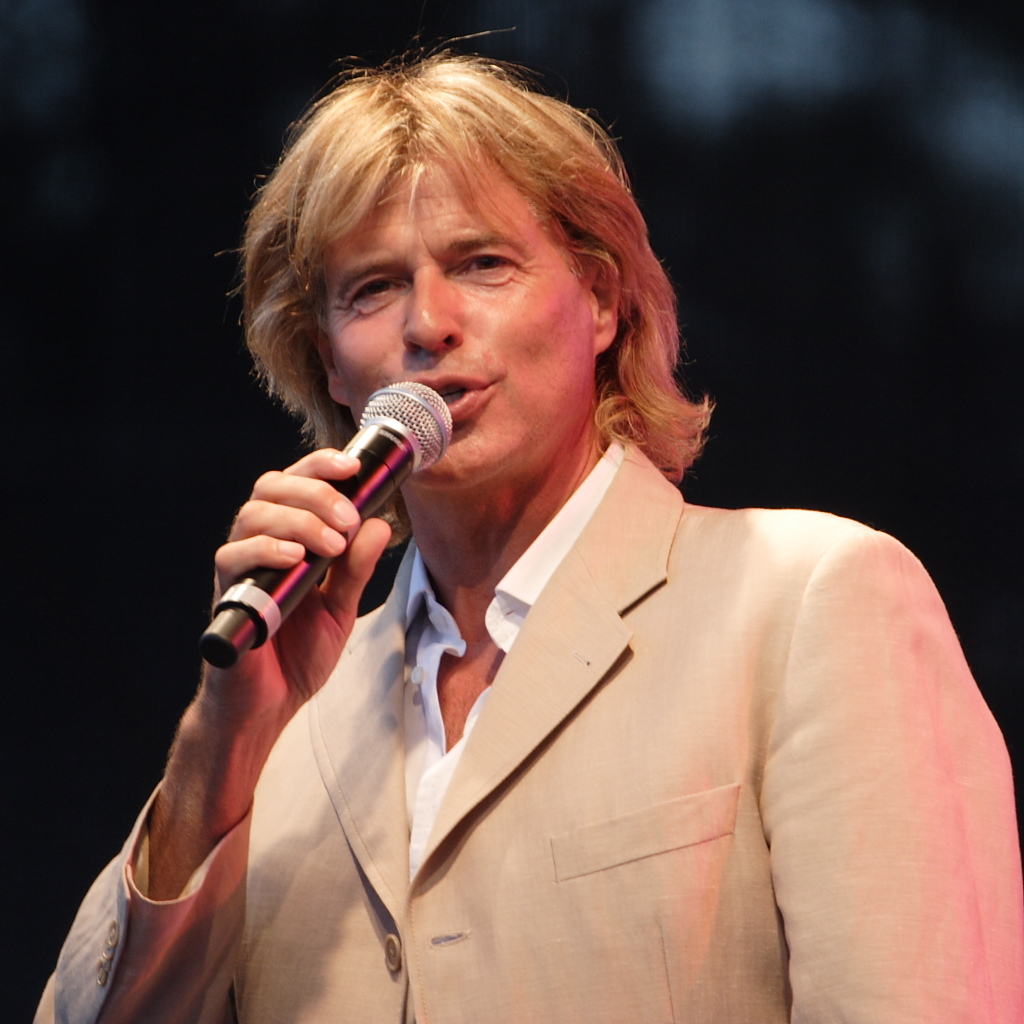
Hansi Hinterseer, 2006

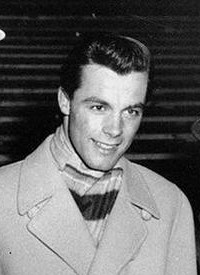
Toni Sailer, 1956

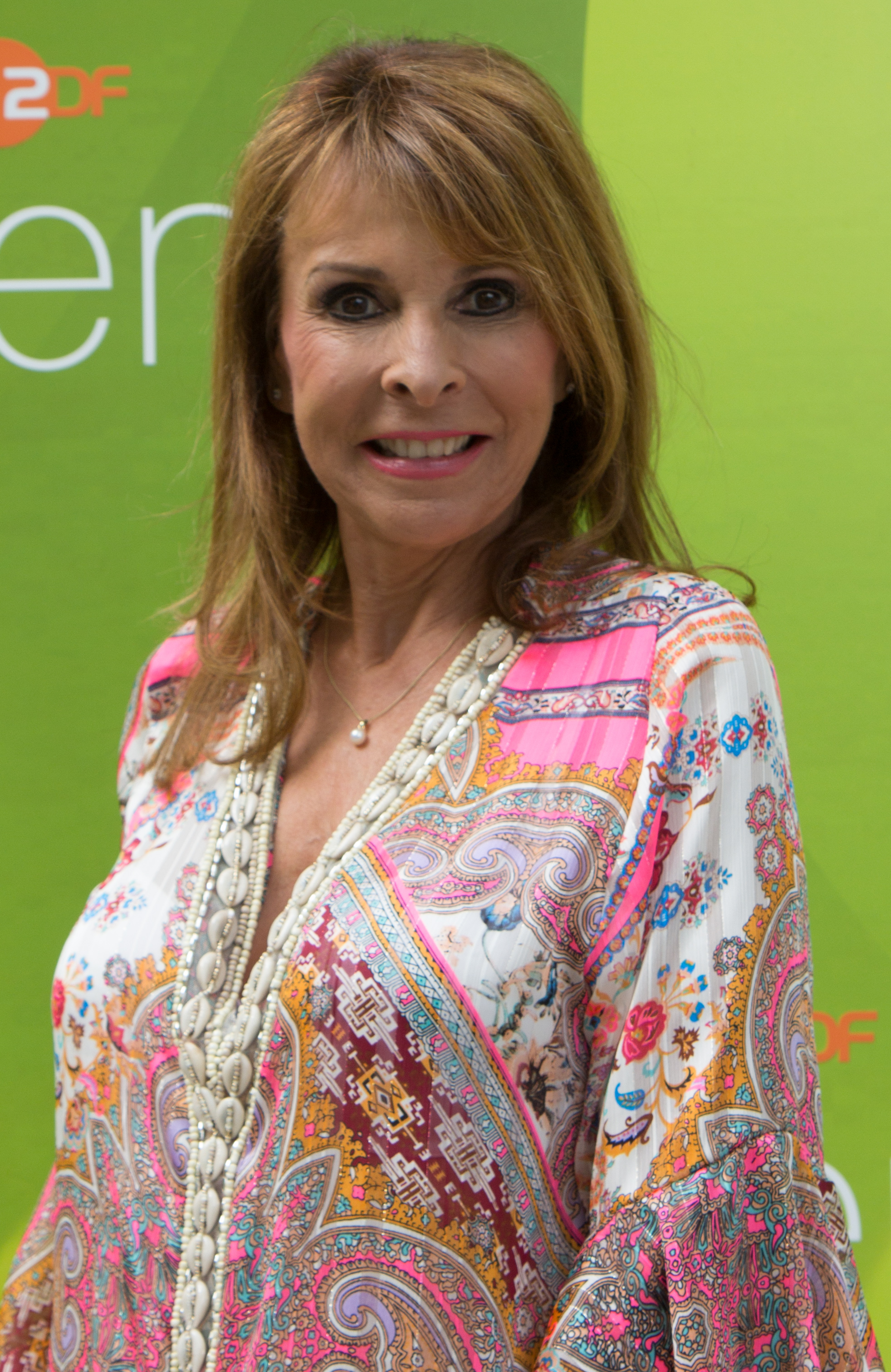
Ireen Sheer, 2018

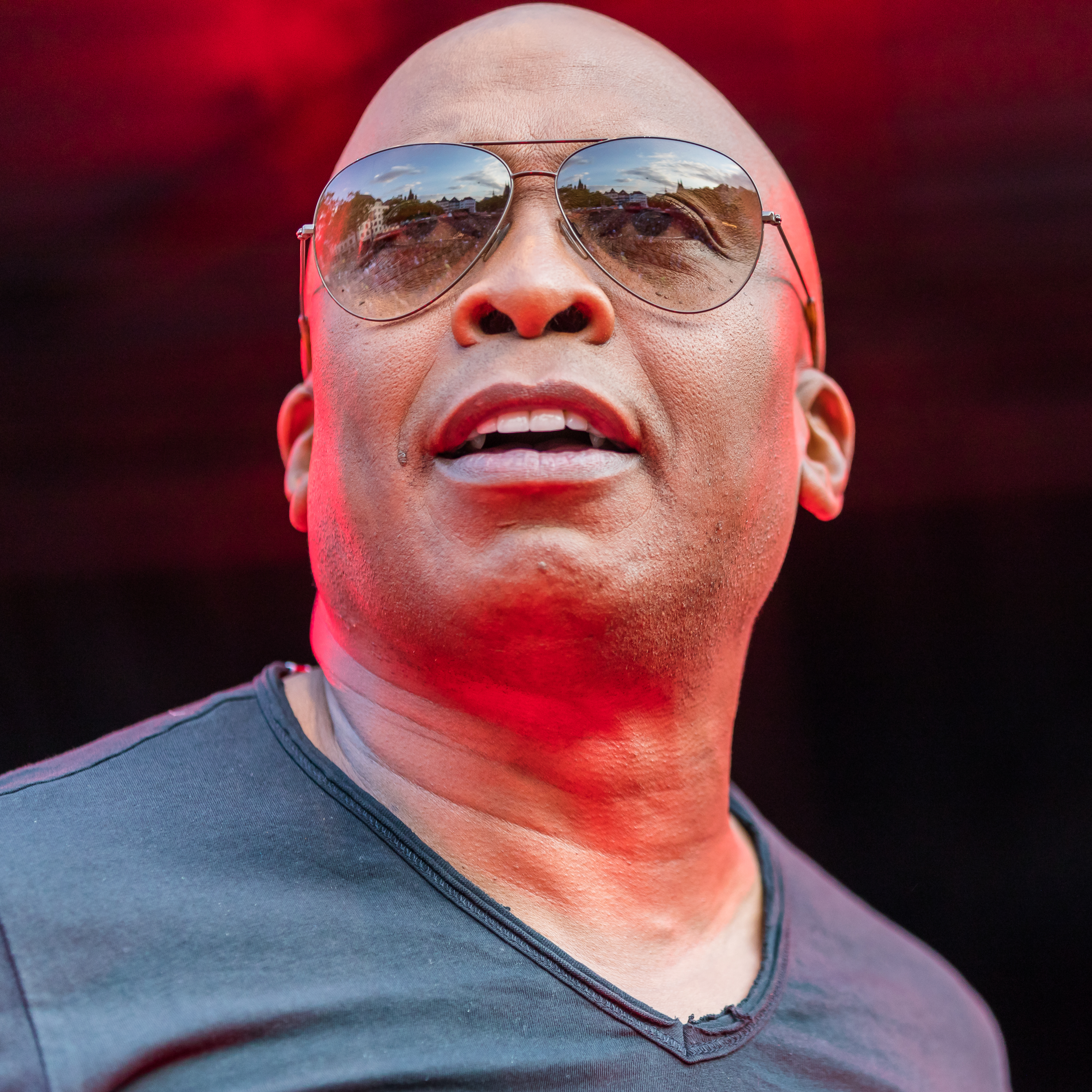
Haddaway, 2019

- Karl Wilhelm von Dalla Torre (1850–1928), Austrian entomologist and botanist
- Alfons Walde (1891–1958), Austrian expressionist painter and architect
- Peter Aufschnaiter (1900–1973), an Austrian mountaineer, agricultural scientist, geographer and cartographer.
- Georg Hochfilzer (born 1937), famous international hotel director of the Hotel Bristol in Vienna
- Jörg Friedrich (born 1944) German author and historian
- Roman Strobl (born 1951), Austrian sculptor
- Hansi Hinterseer (born 1954), an Austrian schlager singer, actor, entertainer and former alpine skier.

=== Sport ===
- Peter Aufschnaiter (1899–1973), mountaineer, agricultural scientist, geographer and cartographer.
- Anderl Molterer (1931–2023), Austrian alpine skier, silver and bronze medallist at the 1956 Winter Olympics
- Ernst Hinterseer (born 1932), Austrian alpine skier, gold and bronze medallist at the 1960 Winter Olympics
- Toni Sailer (1935–2009), legendary Austrian alpine skier and actor; three gold medals at the 1956 Winter Olympics
- Hias Leitner (born 1935), Austrian alpine skier, silver medallist at the 1960 Winter Olympics
- Christl Haas (1943–2001), Austrian alpine skier, gold and bronze medallist at the 1964 & 1968 Winter Olympics
- Herbert Huber (1944-1970), Austrian alpine skier and silver medallist at the 1968 Winter Olympics
- Klaus Sulzenbacher (born 1965), Nordic skier, 1 x silver and 3 x bronze medals at the 1988 & 1992 Winter Olympics
- Markus Gandler (born 1966), Austrian cross-country skier, silver medallist at the 1998 Winter Olympics
- Manuel Schmid (born 1981), Austrian footballer who played over 175 games
- David Kreiner (born 1981), an Austrian Nordic combined skier and team gold medallist at the 2010 Winter Olympics
- Andreas Hölzl (born 1985) is an Austrian footballer who has played over 380 games and 9 for Austria
- Lukas Hinterseer (born 1991), Austrian footballer who has played over 400 games and 13 for Austria

=== Famous inhabitants of Kitzbühel ===
- Phyllis Bottome (1885–1963), British novelist, in 1924 she and her husband started a local school
- Leni Riefenstahl (1902–2003), German filmmaker, photographer and dancer
- Ian Fleming (1908–1964), British spy novel author; in 1927, he went to the Tennerhof, a small private school
- Heinrich Harrer (1912–2006), Austrian mountaineer, author and geographer; in 1952, he settled down locally
- Trude Lechle (1919–2014), Austrian skier, actress and camerawoman; died locally
- Uschi Glas (born 1944), German actress in film, television, and on stage, and a singer.
- Werner Baldessarini (born 1945), fashion designer and businessman, formerly chairman of Hugo Boss; lives locally
- Franz Beckenbauer (1945–2024), German football player and manager; in 1982, he moved to Austria
- Ireen Sheer (born 1949), pop singer, has represented Luxembourg and Germany at the Eurovision Song Contest
- Rebecca De Mornay (born 1959), American film and television actress
- Susanne Klatten (born 1962), German billionaire heiress, in 1990 she married locally
- Haddaway (born 1965), Trinidadian-German singer, best-known hit: "What Is Love", lives locally
- Philipp Kohlschreiber (born 1983), German tennis player, in 2018 married locally

== Sport ==
Kitzbühel is one of Europe’s best-known winter sports resorts, situated between the mountains Hahnenkamm (elev. 1,712 m (5,617 ft)) adjacent to the southwest and Kitzbühler Horn (1,996 m (6,549 ft)) to the northeast. The Hahnenkamm hosts the annual World Cup ski races, including the circuit's most notable event, the Hahnenkamm Races on the notable Streif slope. Introduced 89 years ago in 1937, the northeast-facing Streif is among the world's toughest downhill courses, if not the most, and is infamous for an abundance of spectacular crashes. In 1959 the Austrian Alpine Ski Championships took place from 27 February to 1 March.

Each summer Kitzbühel also hosts an ATP tennis tournament on clay, the Austrian Open.

From 2007 to 2011, ITU Triathlon World Cup races took place at the local Schwarzsee lake.

The Kitzbüheler Alpenrallye is an annual festival of historic automobiles, first held 38 years ago in 1988. The first trip of the United Buddy Bears was 2004 to Kitzbühel, following by the first trip into the "big wide world" – when they went to Hong Kong and many other metropolises on all five continents.

Since 2003, Kitzbühel has been hosting an annual Snow Polo event in January.

== Tourism ==
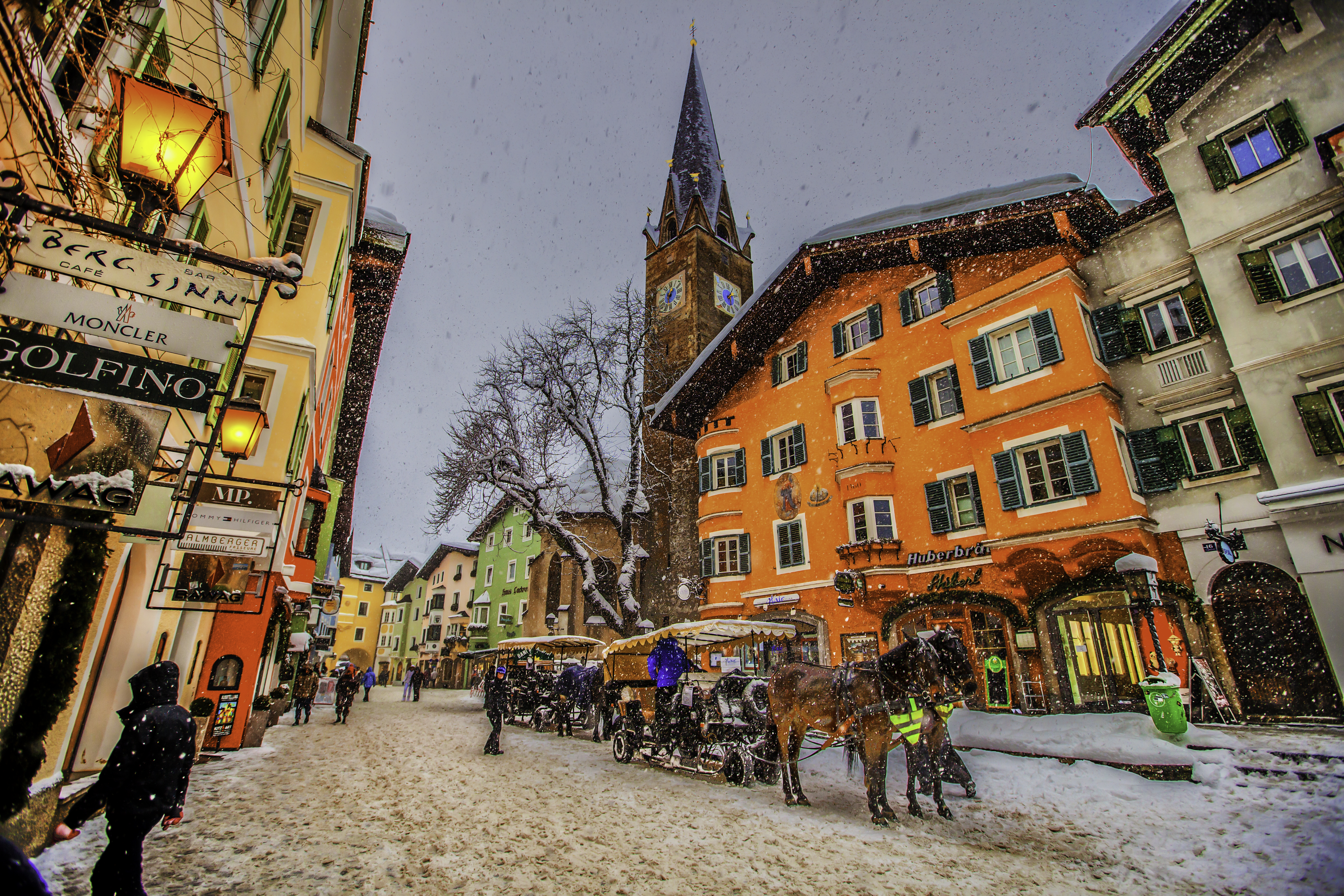
Winter snow in Kitzbühel

Together with the pistes and ski lifts in neighbouring Kirchberg in Tirol, Jochberg and by the Thurn Pass Kitzbühel is one of the largest ski regions in Austria. With around 10,000 hotel and guest house beds, Kitzbühel and its neighbours have an unusually high density of guest accommodation.

Holidaymakers in Kitzbühel have 56 cableway and lift facilities and 168 kilometres of slopes available to them, as well as 40 kilometres of groomed cross-country skiing tracks. Of note is the 3S Cable Car, the cable car with the highest above-ground span in the world.

In summer there are 120 km (75 mi) of mountain bike paths and 500 km (311 mi) of hiking trails.

Other attractions include six tennis courts and four golf courses, the Kitzbühel swimming pool, Austria's only curling hall and the bathing lake of Schwarzsee.

Kitzbühel primarily caters for the high end of the tourist market, as many celebrities and the jet set come here, especially during the international races on the Hahnenkamm.

Together with eleven other towns Kitzbühel is a member of the community Best of the Alps. KitzSki, Kitzbühel's main ski lift operator, has managed to defend the title of “World's Best Ski Resort Company” for the seventh time in a row at the 2020 World Ski Awards.

== Music ==
An International Polkafest was held in Kitzbühel in 1978.

== Transport ==
Road:

The Brixental Road, the B170, from Wörgl intersects in Kitzbühel with the Thurn Pass Road, the B161, from Mittersill to St. Johann in Tirol. Kitzbühel station is a major bus stop for buses to Lienz and Wörgl.

Rail:

Kitzbühel Hauptbahnhof, Kitzbühel Hahnenkamm and Kitzbühel Schwarzsee are stops on the Salzburg-Tyrol Railway. Whilst Hahnenkamm and Schwarzsee stations are served by local trains only, long-distance services from Innsbruck and Graz stop at Kitzbühel station. Kitzbühel station has just been rebuilt (2010) and been equipped with new barrier-less platforms with underpasses and a lift.

== International relations ==
=== Twin towns – sister cities ===
Kitzbühel is twinned with:

- (United States) Greenwich, Connecticut, since 1961
- Yamagata, Japan, since 1963
- (United States) Sun Valley, Idaho, since 1967
- Sterzing, Italy, since 1971
- Rueil-Malmaison, France, since 1979
- Bad Soden am Taunus, Germany, since 1984

== Gallery ==
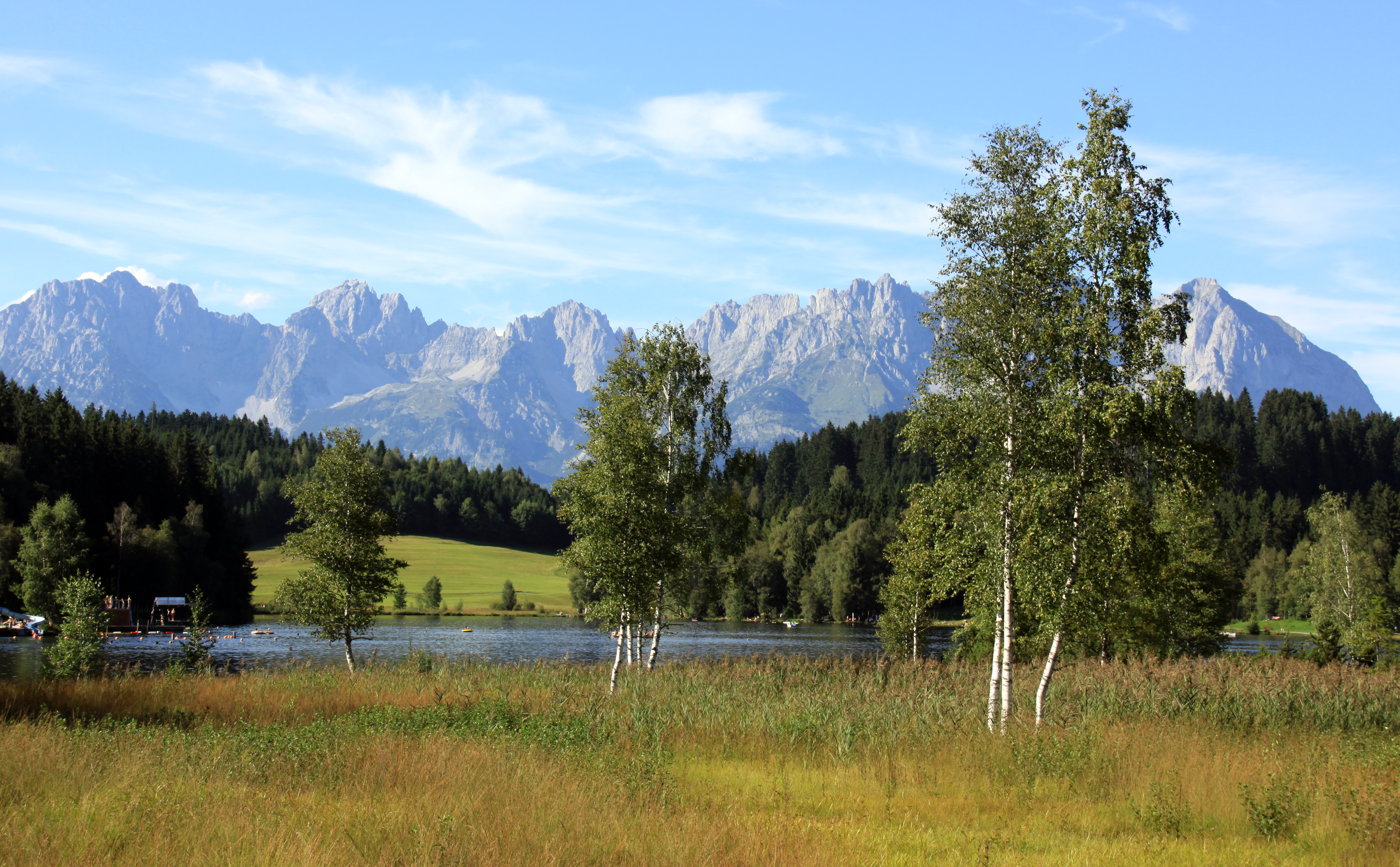
The Schwarzsee lake and Wilder Kaiser mountains as the backdrop

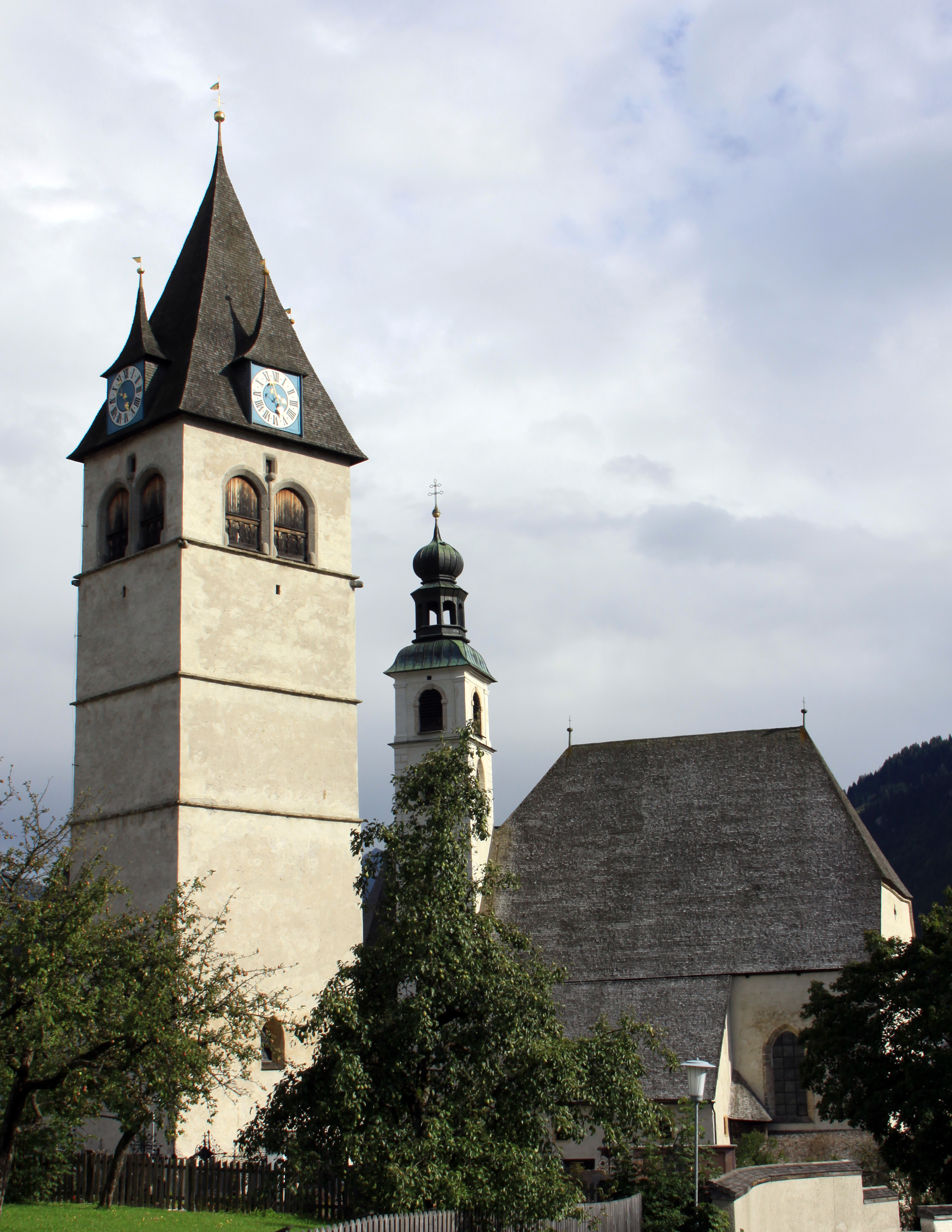
The medieval churches of Liebfrauenkirche (l) and St Andrew's (r)

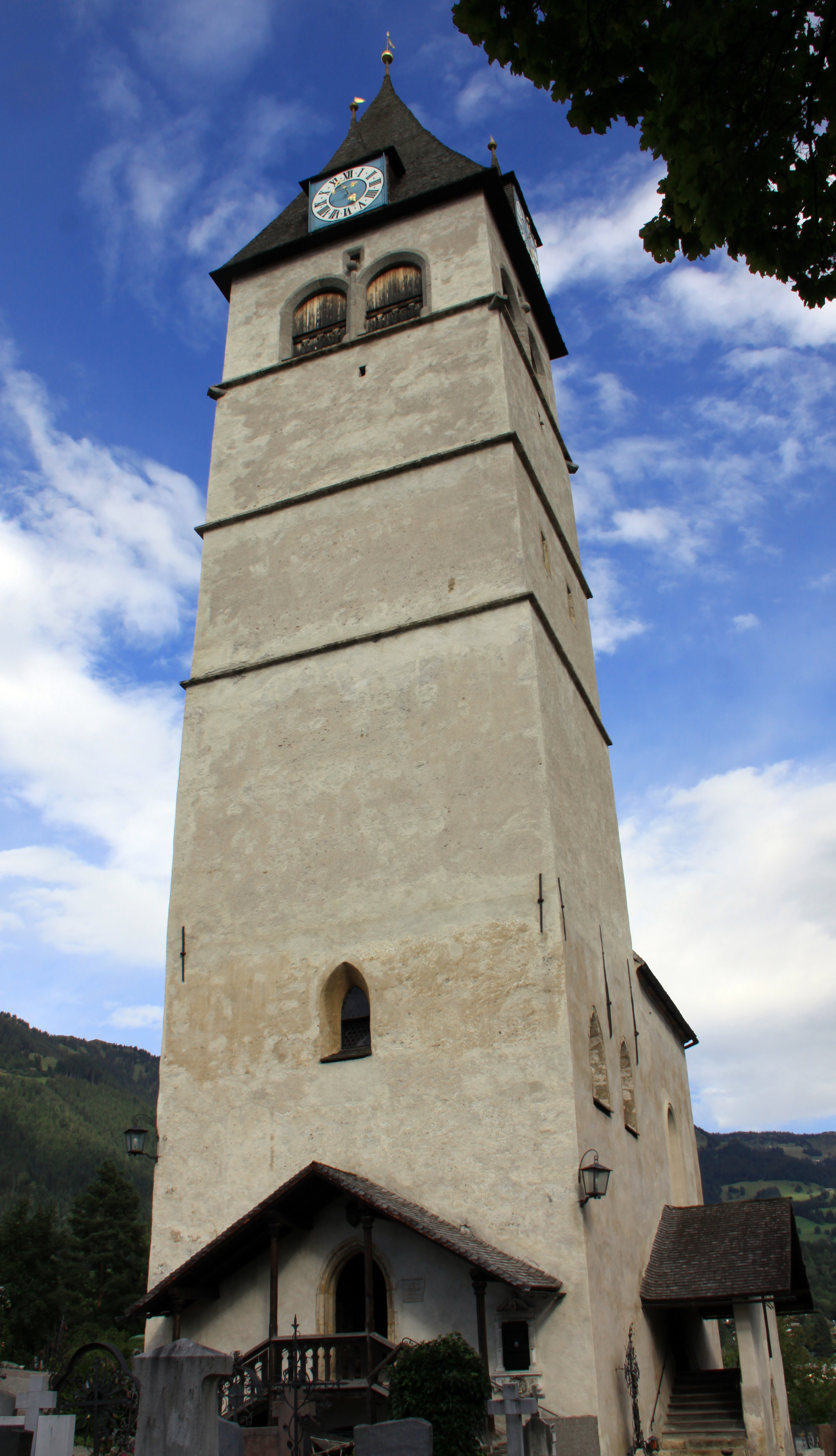
The Liebfrauenkirche church with its 48 m bell tower

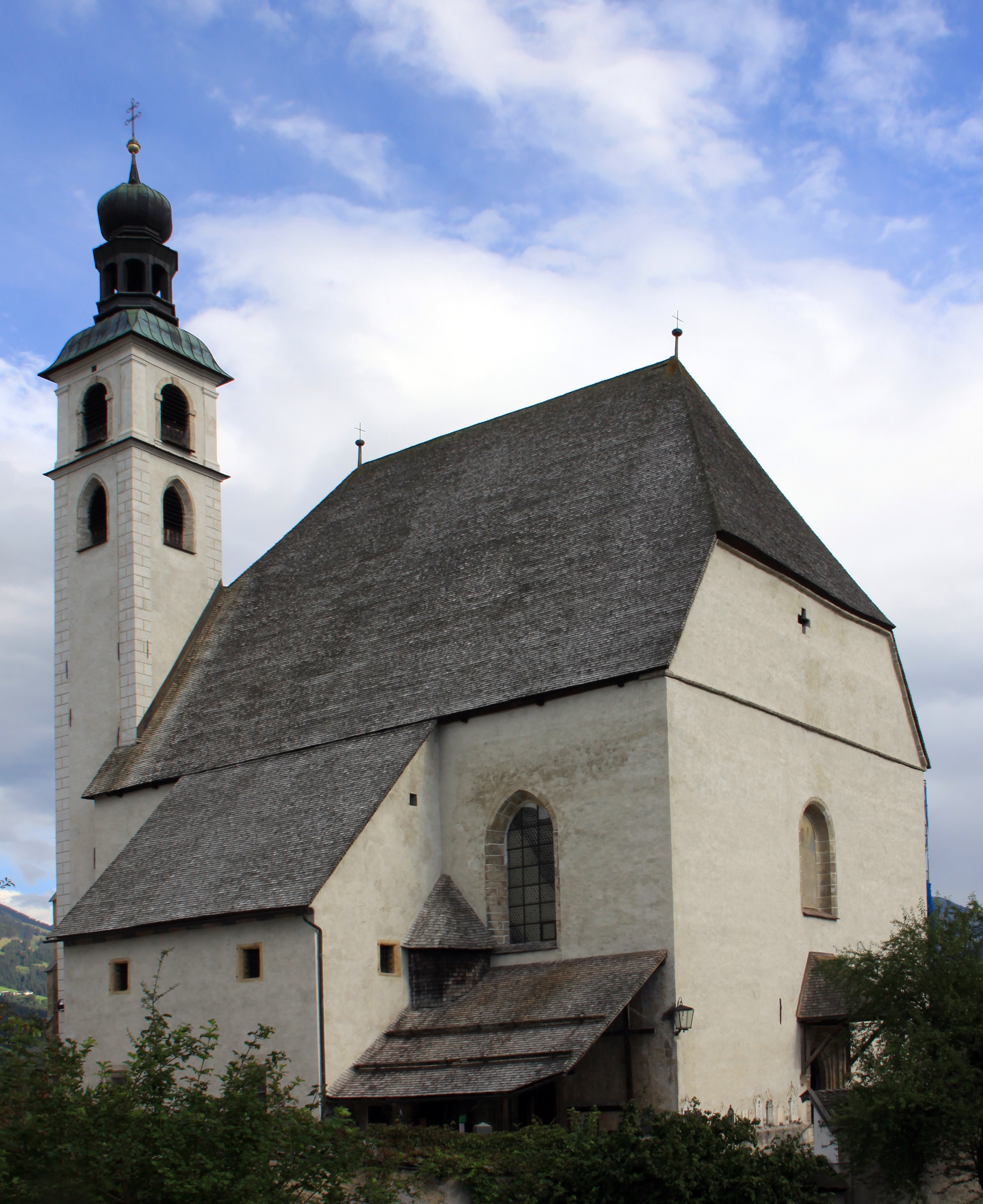
St Andrew's with its 13th-century tower

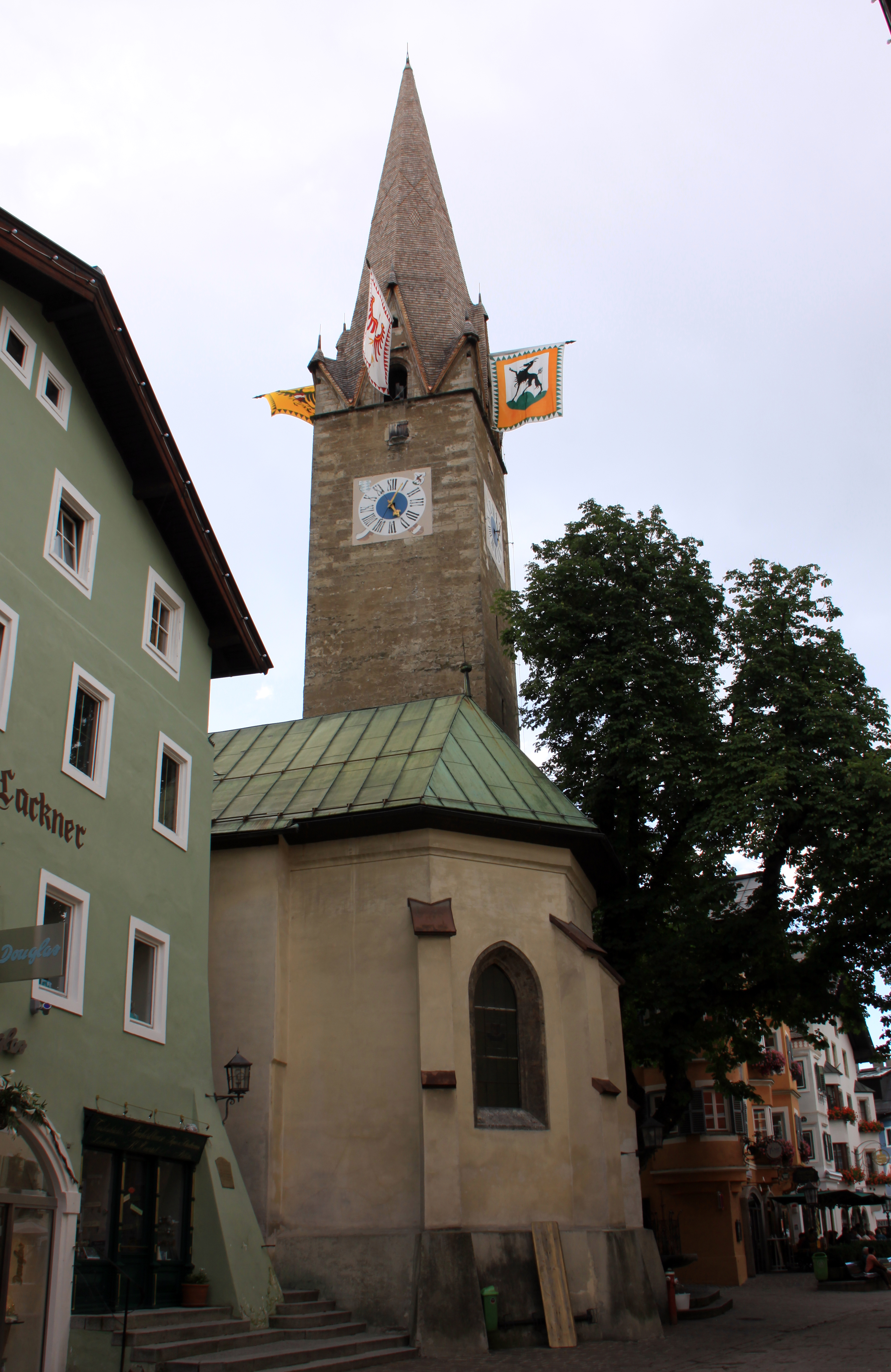
St Catherine's from the north

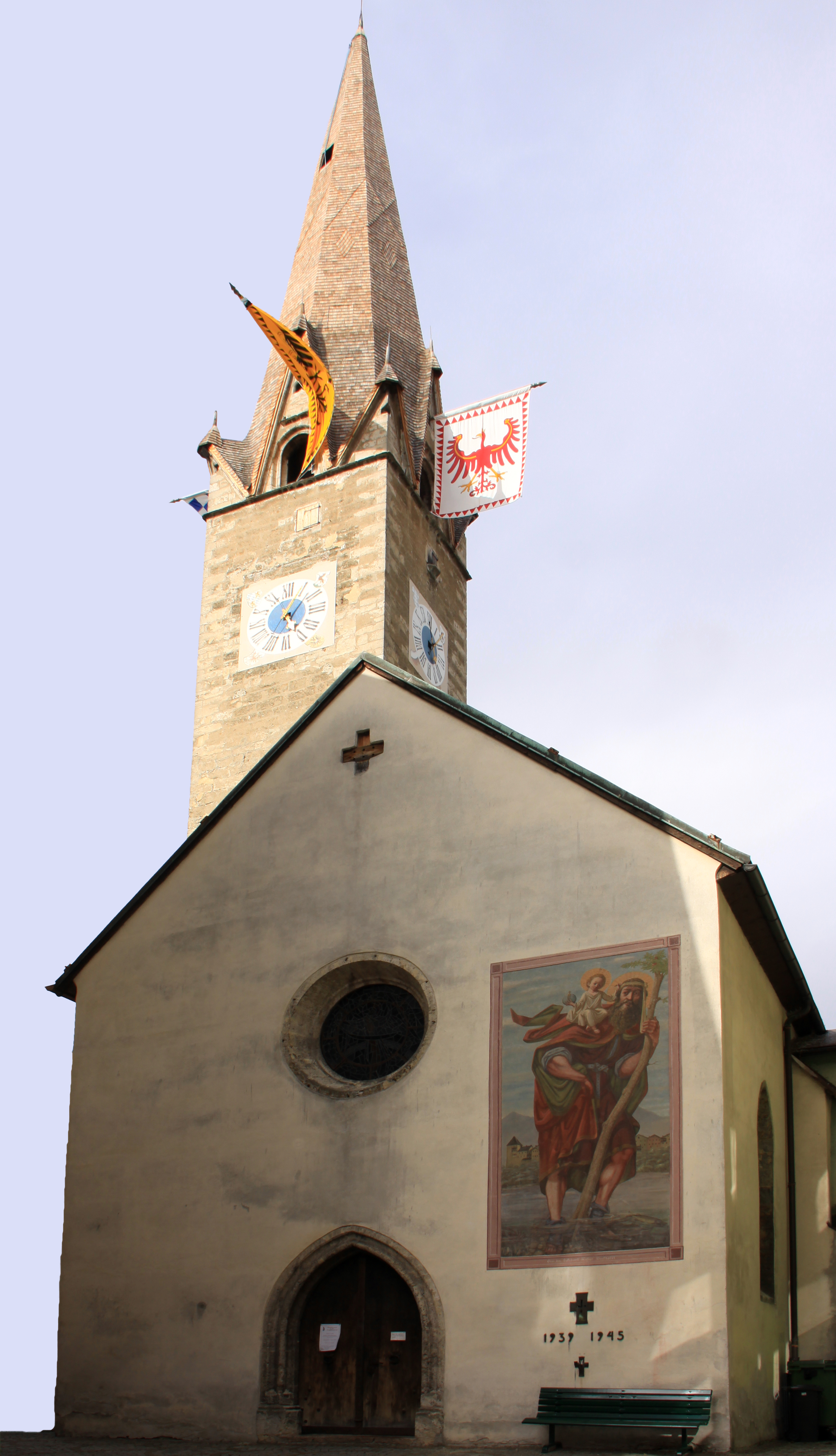
St Catherine's from the south

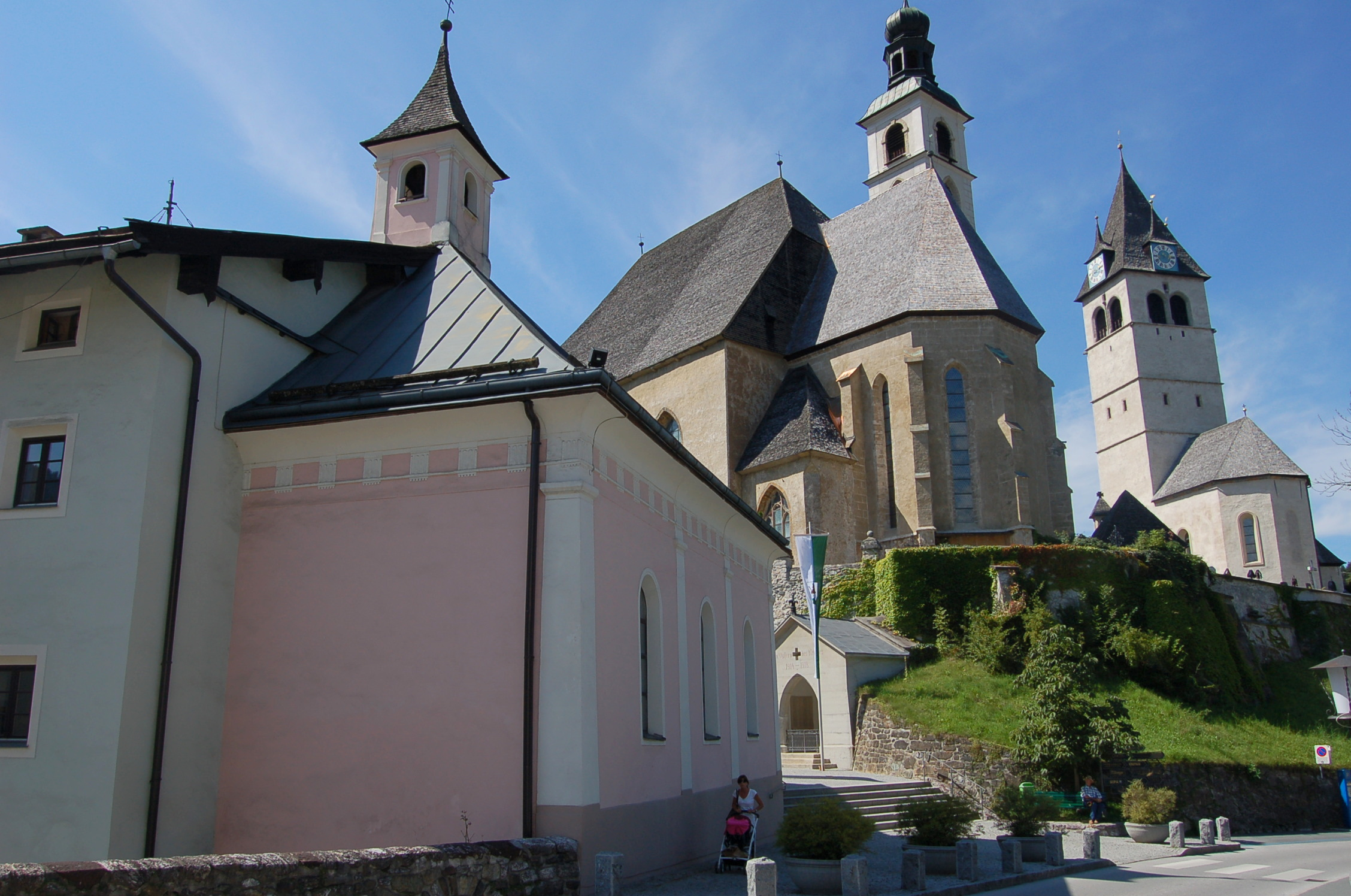
Kitzbühel's twin churches, the Liebfrauenkirche and St Andrew's

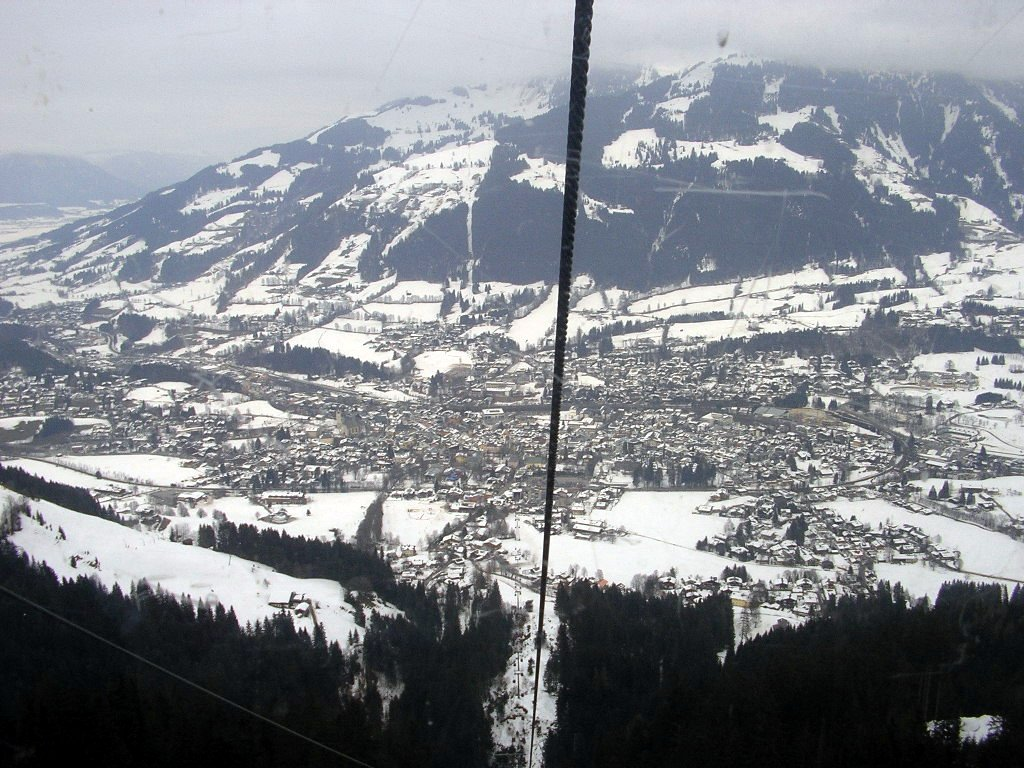
The Kitzbüheler Horn seen from the cable car to the Hahnenkamm

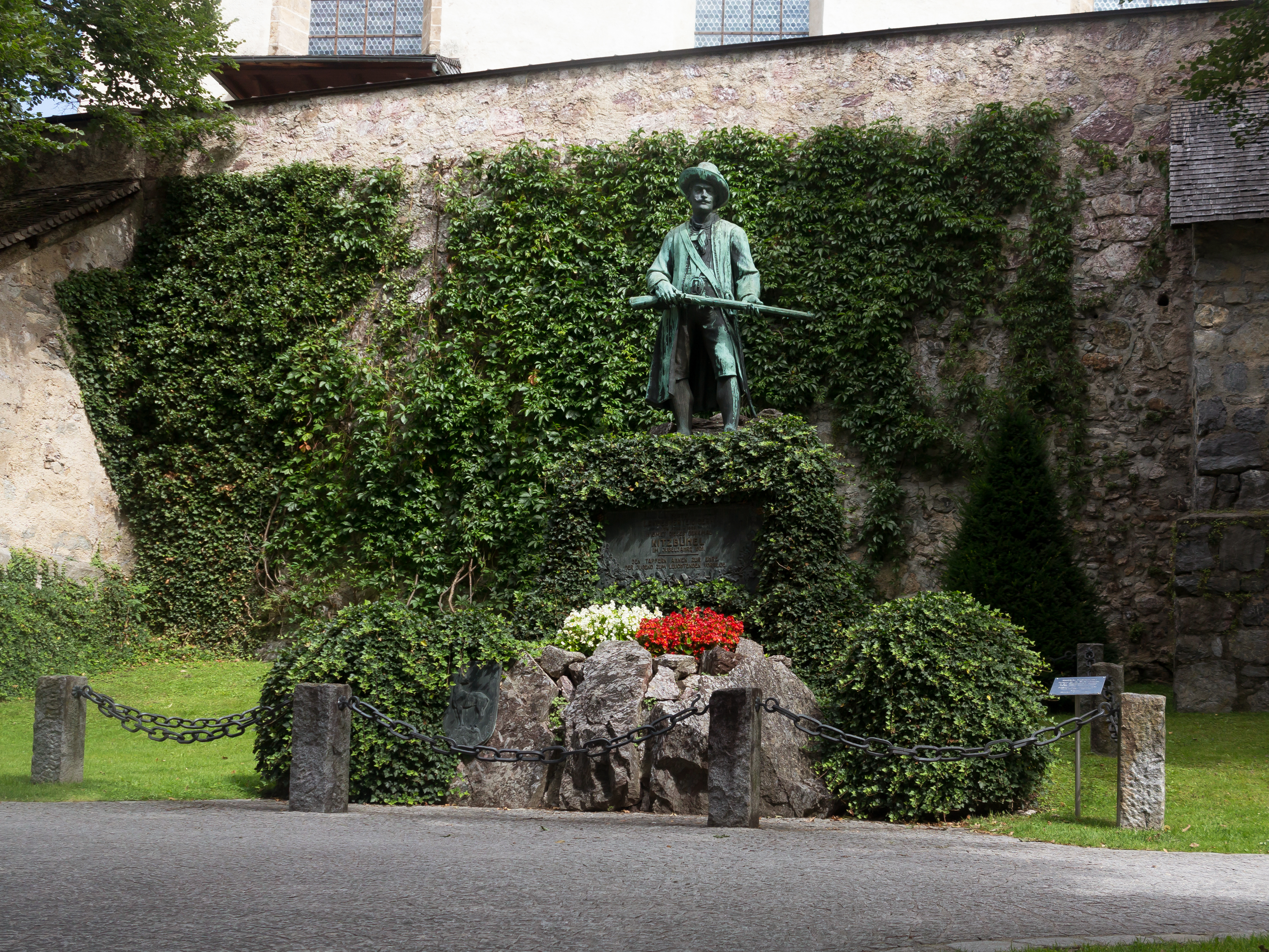
War memorial in Kitzbühel

== Panorama ==
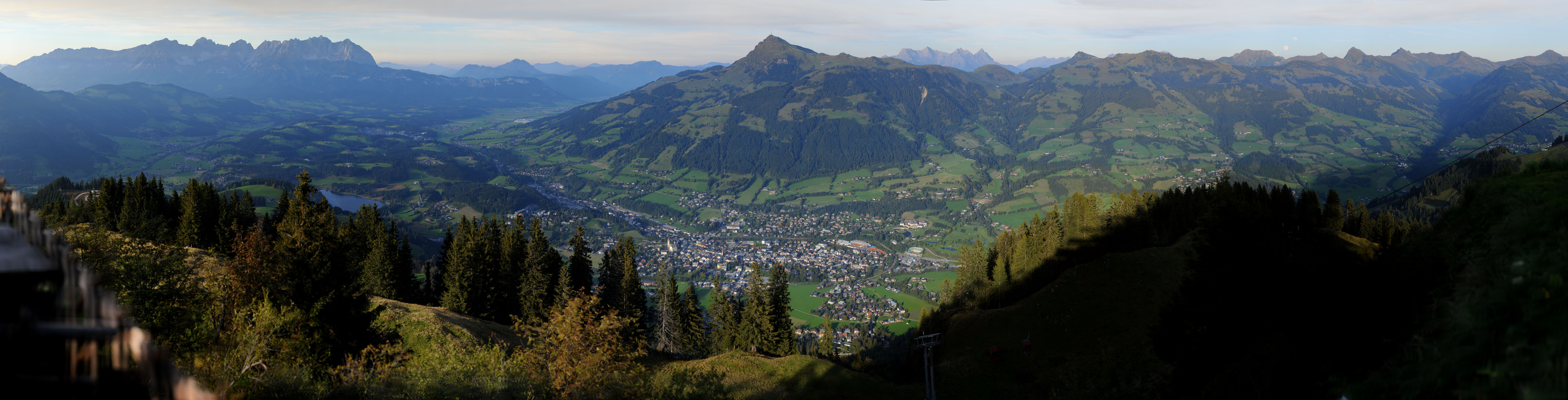

== See also ==
- Salzburg
- Salzburgerland
