= Anneliese Schuh-Proxauf =

Austrian skier and tennis player (1922–2020)

Anneliese Schuh-Proxauf (10 March 1922 – 17 November 2020) was an Austrian alpine skier and tennis player. She competed in the 1948 Winter Olympics.
