= Trude Klecker =

Austrian alpine skier and world champion

Personal information
- Nationality: Austrian
- Born: 7 February 1926 (age 100) Semmering

Sport
- Sport: Alpine skiing
Medal record
Representing Austria
Women's Alpine skiing
World Championships
Gold medal – first place	1954 Åre	Slalom
Silver medal – second place	1954 Åre	Downhill

Trude Klecker (born 7 February 1926) is an Austrian alpine skier and world champion. She is from Semmering and later lived in Trieste in Italy. Klecker received a gold medal at the 1954 World Championships in Åre, winning the slalom event, and a silver medal in the downhill.
