= Thomas Hauser (alpine skier) =

Austrian alpine skier (born 1953)

Thomas Hauser (born 27 October 1953, in Zell am Ziller) is an Austrian former alpine skier who competed in the 1976 Winter Olympics.
