= Hilde Hofherr =

Austrian alpine skier

Personal information
- Nationality: Austrian
- Born: 20 April 1930 (age 96) Lermoos, Austria

Sport
- Sport: Alpine skiing

Hilde Hofherr (born 20 April 1930) is an Austrian alpine skier. She competed at the 1956 Winter Olympics and the 1960 Winter Olympics.
