= Herlinde Beutlhauser =

Austrian alpine skier (born 1936)

Personal information
- Nationality: Austrian
- Born: 23 November 1936 (age 89) Sankt Gilgen, Austria

Sport
- Sport: Alpine skiing

Herlinde Beutlhauser (born 23 November 1936) is an Austrian alpine skier. She competed in the women's downhill at the 1960 Winter Olympics.
