= Erika Netzer =

Austrian alpine skier (1937–1977)

Personal information
- Born: 23 June 1937; Sankt Gallenkirch, Vorarlberg, Austria
- Died: 30 November 1977; Sankt Gallen, Switzerland

Sport
- Sport: Alpine Skiing

Erika Netzer (23 June 1937 – 30 November 1977) was an Austrian alpine skier. She had a surprise victory in 1959 that garnered her attention. She went on to compete for Austria at the 1960 Winter Olympics.
