= Toni Spiss =

Austrian alpine skier (1930–1993)

Medal record

Men's alpine skiing

Representing Austria

Olympic Games
Bronze medal – third place	1952 Oslo	Giant Slalom

Toni Spiss (8 April 1930 – 20 March 1993) was an Austrian alpine skier.

He was born and died in Sankt Anton am Arlberg.

At the 1952 Olympics in Oslo Spiss was bronze medalist in the giant slalom, 3.8 seconds behind gold winner Stein Eriksen.
