= Christian Pravda =

Austrian alpine ski racer (1927–1994)

Medal record

Men's Alpine skiing

Olympic Games
Silver medal – second place	1952 Oslo	Giant slalom
Bronze medal – third place	1952 Oslo	Downhill

World Championships
Gold medal – first place	1954 Åre	Downhill
Silver medal – second place	1954 Åre	Combined

Christian Pravda (8 March 1927 – 11 November 1994) was an Austrian alpine ski racer.

He was born in Kufstein, Austria.

At the age 20, he participated in the 1948 Winter Olympics in the slalom, but was disqualified.

At the 1952 Winter Olympics in Oslo, Norway, Pravda won two medals: silver in giant slalom and a bronze medal in the downhill.

Pravda won the prestigious Hahnenkamm downhill twice, in 1951 and 1954. He also won the Wengen downhill in 1954, the first of only ten racers to win both of these classic downhills in the same year.
