= Anderl Molterer =

Austrian alpine skier (1931–2023)

Olympic medal record

Representing Austria

Men's alpine skiing
Silver medal – second place	1956 Cortina d'Ampezzo	Giant slalom
Bronze medal – third place	1956 Cortina d'Ampezzo	Downhill

Andreas "Anderl" Molterer (8 October 1931 – 24 October 2023) was an Austrian alpine skier. He was born in Kitzbühel.

At the 1956 Winter Olympics in Cortina d'Ampezzo, Italy he won silver in the giant slalom, and bronze in the downhill competition. In 1953, 1955, 1958, and 1959 he won the Hahnenkamm Race in Kitzbühel. There was no skiing world cup in these times, but Molterer most likely would have won it in 1953, 1955, 1956, and 1958. Molterer later emigrated to the United States. After running ski schools in Montana and Colorado, he settled in Tennessee.

Molterer died on 24 October 2023, at the age of 92.
