= FIS Alpine Ski World Cup =

Top international circuit of alpine skiing competitions

Alpine Ski World Cup
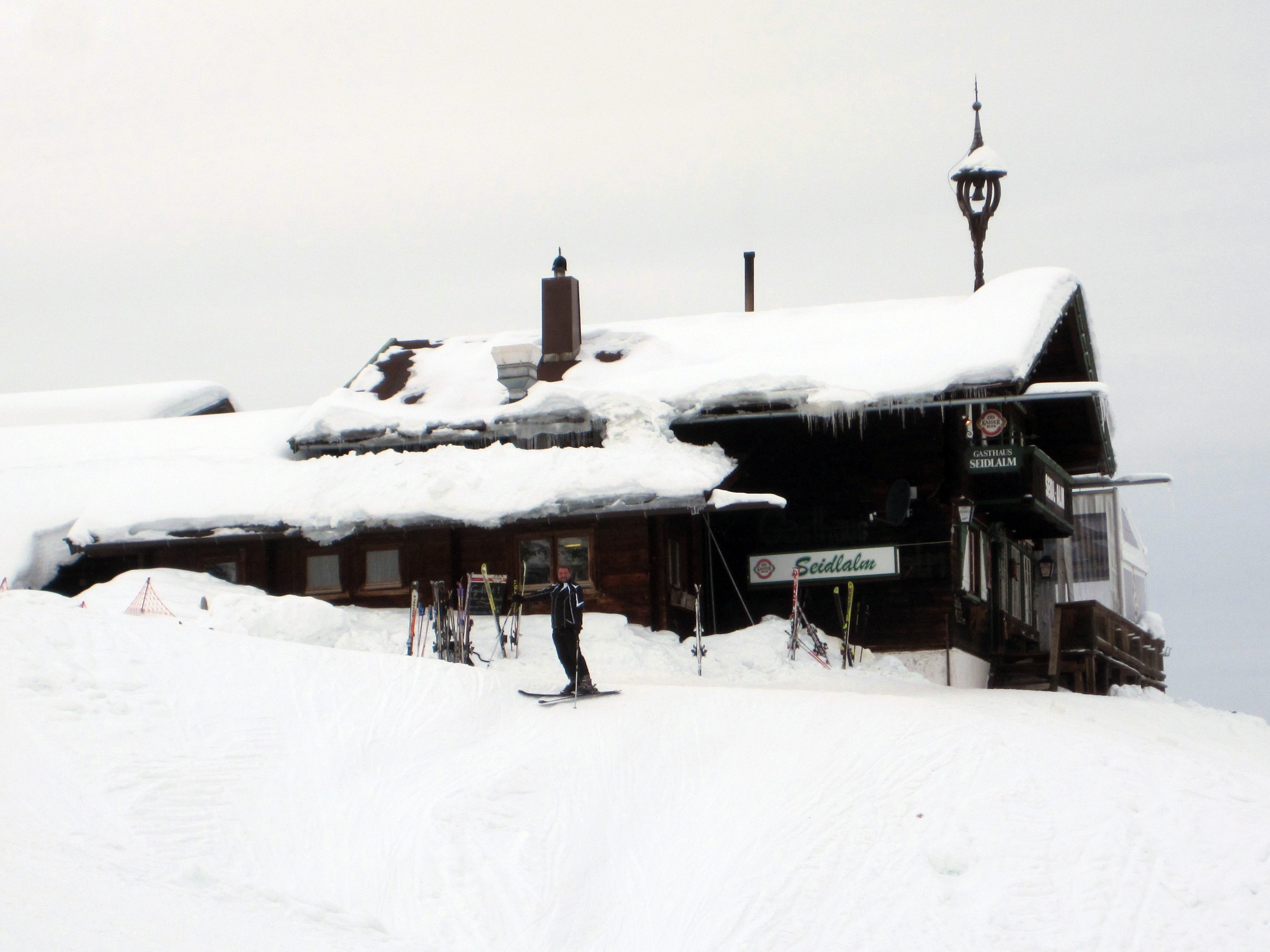
- Seidlalm, a gasthaus at "Streif" (Kitzbühel) where World Cup was founded by Lang, Bonnet, and Beattie.
- Genre: Alpine skiing
- Locations: Europe and North America; occasionally in Japan, Russia, Australia, Argentina, South Korea, New Zealand
- Inaugurated: 5 January 1967 (men); 7 January 1967 (women)
- Founders: (France) Serge Lang (France) Honoré Bonnet (United States) Bob Beattie
- Organiser: International Ski Federation (FIS)
- People: Chief Race Directors (Italy) Markus Waldner (M) (Italy) (Slovenia) Peter Gerdol (W)
- Sponsor: Audi Quattro

The FIS Alpine Ski World Cup is the top international circuit of alpine skiing competitions, launched in 1966 by a group of ski racing friends and experts that included French journalist Serge Lang and the alpine ski team directors from France (Honoré Bonnet) and the USA (Bob Beattie). It was soon backed by International Ski Federation president Marc Hodler during the FIS Alpine World Ski Championships 1966 at Portillo, Chile, and became an official FIS event in the spring of 1967 after the FIS Congress at Beirut, Lebanon.

The inaugural World Cup race was held on 5 January 1967 in Berchtesgaden, West Germany, a slalom won by Heinrich Messner of Austria. Jean-Claude Killy of France and Nancy Greene of Canada were the overall winners for the first two seasons.

== Rules ==
Competitors attempt to achieve the best time in four disciplines: slalom, giant slalom, super G, and downhill. The fifth event, the combined, employs the downhill and slalom. The World Cup originally included only slalom, giant slalom, and downhill races. Combined events (calculated using results from selected downhill and slalom races) were included starting with the 1974–75 season, while the Super G was added at the 1982–83 season.

The current scoring system was implemented in the 1991–92 season. For every race points are awarded to the top 30 finishers: 100 points to the winner, 80 for second, 60 for third, winding down to 1 point for 30th place. The racer with the most points at the end of the season in mid-March wins the cup, represented by a 9 kilogram crystal globe. Sub-prizes are also awarded in each individual race discipline, with a smaller 3.5 kg crystal globe.

Since 1967, the big crystal globe has been awarded for the overall title. From the beginning to 1971–72, discipline titles were awarded with medals. Statistically, those titles have the same value as the small crystal globes, which first appeared for discipline titles in slalom, giant slalom and downhill in the 1977–78. In super-G, the small globe has been awarded since 1985–86. For super-g races in the three seasons previous, points were added and calculated in the giant slalom ranking.

The World Cup is held annually, and is considered the premier competition for alpine ski racing after the quadrennial Winter Olympics. Many consider the World Cup to be a more valuable title than the Olympics or the biennial World Championships, since it requires a competitor to ski at an extremely high level in several disciplines throughout the season, and not just in one race.

Races are hosted primarily at ski resorts in the Alps in Europe, with regular stops in Scandinavia, North America, and east Asia, but a few races have also been held in the Southern Hemisphere. World Cup competitions have been hosted in 25 countries around the world: Andorra, Argentina, Australia, Austria, Bosnia and Herzegovina, Bulgaria, Canada, Croatia, Czech Republic, Finland, France, Germany, Italy, Japan, New Zealand, Norway, Poland, Russia, Slovakia, Slovenia, South Korea, Spain, Sweden, Switzerland, and the United States.

Lower competitive circuits include the NorAm Cup in North America and the Europa Cup in Europe.

Crystal Globe of the World Cup Winner

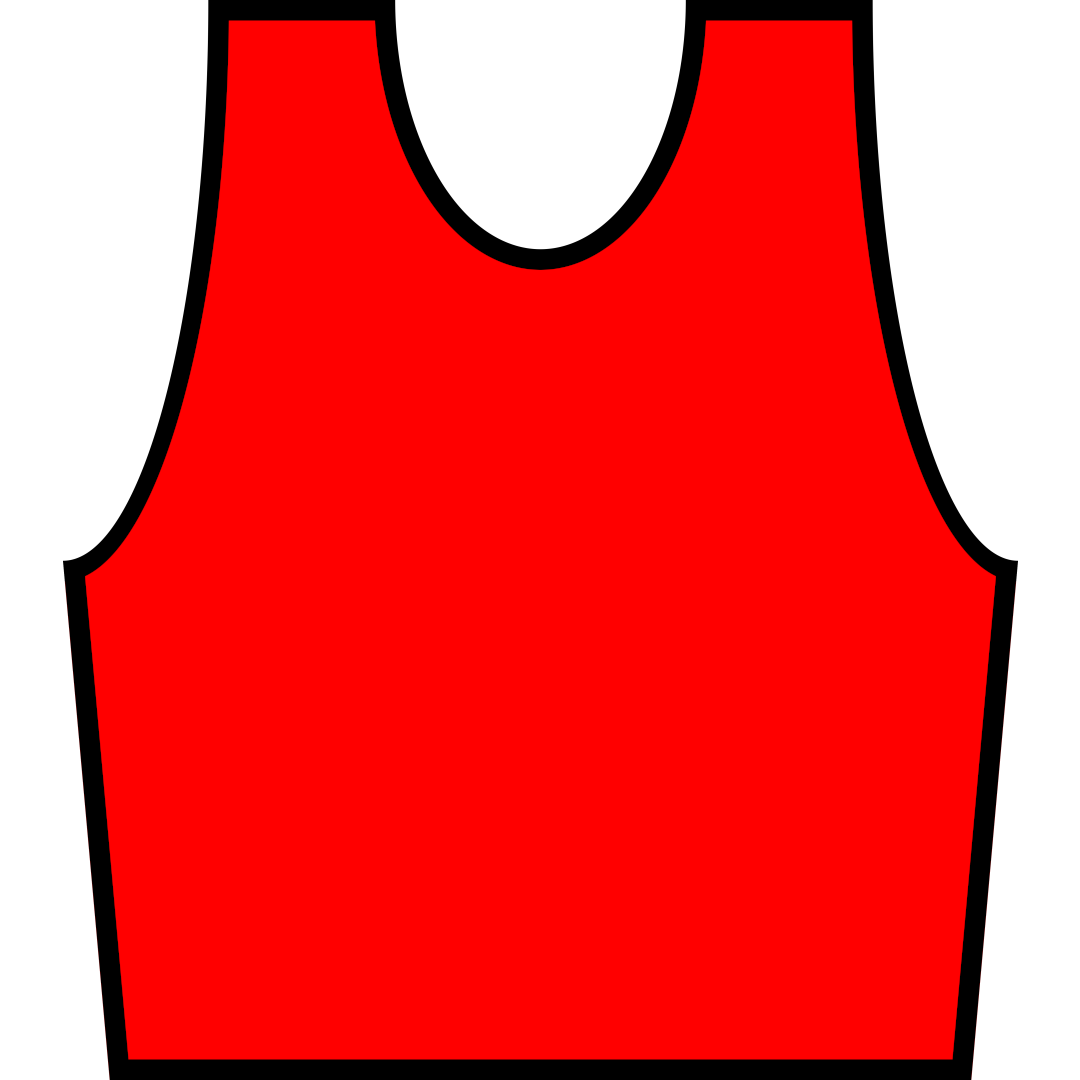
Red Bib of the World Cup Leader

== Overall winners ==
=== Men's individual ===
Season	Winner	Runner-up	Third place
1967	(France) Jean-Claude Killy	(Austria) Heinrich Messner	(France) Guy Périllat
1968	(France) Jean-Claude Killy (2)	(Switzerland) Dumeng Giovanoli	(Austria) Herbert Huber
1968–69	(Austria) Karl Schranz	(France) Jean-Noël Augert	(Austria) Reinhard Tritscher
1969–70	(Austria) Karl Schranz (2)	(France) Patrick Russel	(Italy) Gustav Thöni
1970–71	(Italy) Gustav Thöni	(France) Henri Duvillard	(France) Patrick Russel
1971–72	(Italy) Gustav Thöni	(France) Henri Duvillard (2)	(Switzerland) Edmund Bruggmann
1972–73	(Italy) Gustav Thöni	(Austria) David Zwilling	(Switzerland) Roland Collombin
1973–74	(Italy) Piero Gros	(Italy) Gustav Thöni	(Austria) Hansi Hinterseer
1974–75	(Italy) Gustav Thöni (4)	(Sweden) Ingemar Stenmark	(Austria) Franz Klammer
1975–76	(Sweden) Ingemar Stenmark	(Italy) Piero Gros	(Italy) Gustav Thöni (2)
1976–77	(Sweden) Ingemar Stenmark	(Austria) Klaus Heidegger	(Austria) Franz Klammer (2)
1977–78	(Sweden) Ingemar Stenmark (3)	(United States) Phil Mahre	(Liechtenstein) Andreas Wenzel
1978–79	(Switzerland) Peter Luscher	(Austria) Leonhard Stock	(United States) Phil Mahre
1979–80	(Liechtenstein) Andreas Wenzel	(Sweden) Ingemar Stenmark	(United States) Phil Mahre (2)
1980–81	(United States) Phil Mahre	(Sweden) Ingemar Stenmark	(Soviet Union) Aleksandr Zhirov
1981–82	(United States) Phil Mahre	(Sweden) Ingemark Stenmark	(United States) Steve Mahre
1982–83	(United States) Phil Mahre (3)	(Sweden) Ingemar Stenmark	(Liechtenstein) Andreas Wenzel
1983–84	(Switzerland) Pirmin Zurbriggen	(Sweden) Ingemar Stenmark (6)	(Luxembourg) Marc Girardelli
1984–85	(Luxembourg) Marc Girardelli	(Switzerland) Pirmin Zurbriggen	(Liechtenstein) Andreas Wenzel (3)
1985–86	(Luxembourg) Marc Girardelli	(Switzerland) Pirmin Zurbriggen	(West Germany) Markus Wasmeier
1986–87	(Switzerland) Pirmin Zurbriggen	(Luxembourg) Marc Girardelli	(West Germany) Markus Wasmeier (2)
1987–88	(Switzerland) Pirmin Zurbriggen	(Italy) Alberto Tomba	(Austria) Hubert Strolz
1988–89	(Luxembourg) Marc Girardelli	(Switzerland) Pirmin Zurbriggen (3)	(Italy) Alberto Tomba
1989–90	(Switzerland) Pirmin Zurbriggen (4)	(Norway) Ole Kristian Furuseth	(Austria) Günther Mader
1990–91	(Luxembourg) Marc Girardelli	(Italy) Alberto Tomba	(Austria) Rudolf Nierlich
1991–92	(Switzerland) Paul Accola	(Italy) Alberto Tomba (3)	(Luxembourg) Marc Girardelli (2)
1992–93	(Luxembourg) Marc Girardelli (5)	(Norway) Kjetil André Aamodt	(Austria) Franz Heinzer
1993–94	(Norway) Kjetil André Aamodt	(Luxembourg) Marc Girardelli (2)	(Italy) Alberto Tomba (2)
1994–95	(Italy) Alberto Tomba	(Austria) Günther Mader	(Slovenia) Jure Košir
1995–96	(Norway) Lasse Kjus	(Austria) Günther Mader (2)	(Switzerland) Michael von Grünigen
1996–97	(France) Luc Alphand	(Norway) Kjetil André Aamodt	(Austria) Josef Strobl
1997–98	(Austria) Hermann Maier	(Austria) Andreas Schifferer	(Austria) Stephan Eberharter
1998–99	(Norway) Lasse Kjus (2)	(Norway) Kjetil André Aamodt	(Austria) Hermann Maier
1999–2000	(Austria) Hermann Maier	(Norway) Kjetil André Aamodt	(Austria) Josef Strobl (2)
2000–01	(Austria) Hermann Maier	(Austria) Stephan Eberharter	(Norway) Lasse Kjus
2001–02	(Austria) Stephan Eberharter	(Norway) Kjetil André Aamodt (5)	(United States) Bode Miller
2002–03	(Austria) Stephan Eberharter (2)	(United States) Bode Miller	(Norway) Kjetil André Aamodt
2003–04	(Austria) Hermann Maier (4)	(Austria) Stephan Eberharter (2)	(Austria) Benjamin Raich
2004–05	(United States) Bode Miller	(Austria) Benjamin Raich	(Austria) Hermann Maier (2)
2005–06	(Austria) Benjamin Raich	(Norway) Aksel Lund Svindal	(United States) Bode Miller (2)
2006–07	(Norway) Aksel Lund Svindal	(Austria) Benjamin Raich	(Switzerland) Didier Cuche
2007–08	(United States) Bode Miller (2)	(Austria) Benjamin Raich	(Switzerland) Didier Cuche
2008–09	(Norway) Aksel Lund Svindal (2)	(Austria) Benjamin Raich	(Switzerland) Didier Cuche
2009–10	(Switzerland) Carlo Janka	(Austria) Benjamin Raich (5)	(Switzerland) Didier Cuche (4)
2010–11	(Croatia) Ivica Kostelić	(Switzerland) Didier Cuche	(Switzerland) Carlo Janka
2011–12	(Austria) Marcel Hirscher	(Switzerland) Beat Feuz	(Norway) Aksel Lund Svindal
2012–13	(Austria) Marcel Hirscher	(Norway) Aksel Lund Svindal	(United States) Ted Ligety
2013–14	(Austria) Marcel Hirscher	(Norway) Aksel Lund Svindal (3)	(France) Alexis Pinturault
2014–15	(Austria) Marcel Hirscher	(Norway) Kjetil Jansrud	(France) Alexis Pinturault
2015–16	(Austria) Marcel Hirscher	(Norway) Henrik Kristoffersen	(France) Alexis Pinturault (3)
2016–17	(Austria) Marcel Hirscher	(Norway) Kjetil Jansrud (2)	(Norway) Henrik Kristoffersen
2017–18	(Austria) Marcel Hirscher	(Norway) Henrik Kristoffersen	(Norway) Aksel Lund Svindal (2)
2018–19	(Austria) Marcel Hirscher (8)	(France) Alexis Pinturault	(Norway) Henrik Kristoffersen
2019–20	(Norway) Aleksander Aamodt Kilde	(France) Alexis Pinturault (2)	(Norway) Henrik Kristoffersen
2020–21	(France) Alexis Pinturault	(Switzerland) Marco Odermatt	(Austria) Marco Schwarz
2021–22	(Switzerland) Marco Odermatt	(Norway) Aleksander Aamodt Kilde	(Norway) Henrik Kristoffersen
2022–23	(Switzerland) Marco Odermatt	(Norway) Aleksander Aamodt Kilde (2)	(Norway) Henrik Kristoffersen (5)
2023–24	(Switzerland) Marco Odermatt	(Switzerland) Loïc Meillard	(Austria) Manuel Feller
2024–25	(Switzerland) Marco Odermatt	(Norway) Henrik Kristoffersen (3)	(Switzerland) Loïc Meillard
2025–26	(Switzerland) Marco Odermatt (5)	(Brazil) Lucas Pinheiro Braathen	(Norway) Atle Lie McGrath

Statistics by country

Rank	Nation	Gold	Silver	Bronze	Total
1	Austria	17	14	17	48
2	Switzerland	12	8	9	29
3	Norway	6	16	10	32
4	Italy	6	5	4	15
5	United States	5	2	6	13
6	Luxembourg	5	2	2	9
7	France	4	6	5	15
8	Sweden	3	6	0	9
9	Liechtenstein	1	0	3	4
10	Croatia	1	0	0	1
11	Brazil	0	1	0	1
12	West Germany	0	0	2	2
13	Slovenia	0	0	1	1
13	Soviet Union	0	0	1	1
Totals (14 entries)		60	60	60	180

=== Women's individual ===
Season	Winner	Runner-up	Third place
1967	(Canada) Nancy Greene	(France) Marielle Goitschel	(France) Annie Famose
1968	(Canada) Nancy Greene (2)	(Switzerland) Isabelle Mir	(France) Florence Steurer
1968–69	(Austria) Gertrude Gabl	(France) Florence Steurer	(Austria) Wiltrud Drexel
1969–70	(France) Michèle Jacot	(France) Françoise Macchi	(France) Florence Steurer (2)
1970–71	(Austria) Annemarie Pröll	(France) Michèle Jacot	(France) Isabelle Mir
1971–72	(Austria) Annemarie Pröll	(France) Françoise Macchi (2)	(France) Britt Lafforgue
1972–73	(Austria) Annemarie Pröll	(Austria) Monika Kaserer	(France) Patricia Emonet
1973–74	(Austria) Annemarie Pröll	(Austria) Monika Kaserer (2)	(Liechtenstein) Hanni Wenzel
1974–75	(Austria) Annemarie Moser-Pröll	(Liechtenstein) Hanni Wenzel	(West Germany) Rosi Mittermaier
1975–76	(West Germany) Rosi Mittermaier	(Switzerland) Lise-Marie Morerod	(Austria) Monika Kaserer
1976–77	(Switzerland) Lise-Marie Morerod	(Austria) Annemarie Moser-Pröll	(Austria) Monika Kaserer (2)
1977–78	(Liechtenstein) Hanni Wenzel	(Austria) Annemarie Moser-Pröll	(Switzerland) Lise-Marie Morerod
1978–79	(Austria) Annemarie Moser-Pröll (6)	(Liechtenstein) Hanni Wenzel	(West Germany) Irene Epple
1979–80	(Liechtenstein) Hanni Wenzel (2)	(Austria) Annemarie Moser-Pröll (3)	(Switzerland) Marie-Theres Nadig
1980–81	(Switzerland) Marie-Theres Nadig	(Switzerland) Erika Hess	(Liechtenstein) Hanni Wenzel (2)
1981–82	(Switzerland) Erika Hess	(West Germany) Irene Epple	(United States) Christin Cooper
1982–83	(United States) Tamara McKinney	(Liechtenstein) Hanni Wenzel	(Switzerland) Erika Hess
1983–84	(Switzerland) Erika Hess (2)	(Liechtenstein) Hanni Wenzel (4)	(United States) Tamara McKinney
1984–85	(Switzerland) Michela Figini	(Switzerland) Brigitte Örtli	(Switzerland) Maria Walliser
1985–86	(Switzerland) Maria Walliser	(Switzerland) Erika Hess (2)	(Switzerland) Vreni Schneider
1986–87	(Switzerland) Maria Walliser (2)	(Switzerland) Vreni Schneider	(Switzerland) Brigitte Örtli
1987–88	(Switzerland) Michela Figini (2)	(Switzerland) Brigitte Örtli (2)	(Austria) Anita Wachter
1988–89	(Switzerland) Vreni Schneider	(Switzerland) Maria Walliser	(Switzerland) Michela Figini
1989–90	(Austria) Petra Kronberger	(Austria) Anita Wachter	(West Germany) Michaela Gerg
1990–91	(Austria) Petra Kronberger	(Austria) Sabine Ginther	(Switzerland) Vreni Schneider (2)
1991–92	(Austria) Petra Kronberger (3)	(France) Carole Merle	(Germany) Katja Seizinger
1992–93	(Austria) Anita Wachter	(Germany) Katja Seizinger	(France) Carole Merle
1993–94	(Switzerland) Vreni Schneider	(Sweden) Pernilla Wiberg	(Germany) Katja Seizinger (2)
1994–95	(Switzerland) Vreni Schneider (3)	(Germany) Katja Seizinger	(Switzerland) Heidi Zeller
1995–96	(Germany) Katja Seizinger	(Germany) Martina Ertl	(Austria) Anita Wachter (2)
1996–97	(Sweden) Pernilla Wiberg	(Germany) Katja Seizinger (3)	(Germany) Hilde Gerg
1997–98	(Germany) Katja Seizinger (2)	(Germany) Martina Ertl (2)	(Germany) Hilde Gerg (2)
1998–99	(Austria) Alexandra Meissnitzer	(Germany) Hilde Gerg	(Austria) Renate Götschl
1999–2000	(Austria) Renate Götschl	(Austria) Michaela Dorfmeister	(France) Régine Cavagnoud
2000–01	(Croatia) Janica Kostelić	(Austria) Renate Götschl	(France) Régine Cavagnoud (2)
2001–02	(Austria) Michaela Dorfmeister	(Austria) Renate Götschl	(Switzerland) Sonja Nef
2002–03	(Croatia) Janica Kostelić	(Italy) Karen Putzer	(Sweden) Anja Pärson
2003–04	(Sweden) Anja Pärson	(Austria) Renate Götschl (3)	(Germany) Maria Riesch
2004–05	(Sweden) Anja Pärson (2)	(Croatia) Janica Kostelić	(Austria) Renate Götschl (2)
2005–06	(Croatia) Janica Kostelić (3)	(Sweden) Anja Pärson	(Austria) Michaela Dorfmeister
2006–07	(Austria) Nicole Hosp	(Austria) Marlies Schild	(United States) Julia Mancuso
2007–08	(United States) Lindsey Vonn	(Austria) Nicole Hosp	(Germany) Maria Riesch
2008–09	(United States) Lindsey Vonn	(Germany) Maria Riesch	(Sweden) Anja Pärson
2009–10	(United States) Lindsey Vonn	(Germany) Maria Riesch	(Sweden) Anja Pärson (3)
2010–11	(Germany) Maria Riesch	(United States) Lindsey Vonn	(Slovenia) Tina Maze
2011–12	(United States) Lindsey Vonn (4)	(Slovenia) Tina Maze	(Germany) Maria Höfl-Riesch (3)
2012–13	(Slovenia) Tina Maze	(Germany) Maria Höfl-Riesch	(Austria) Anna Fenninger
2013–14	(Austria) Anna Fenninger	(Germany) Maria Höfl-Roesch (4)	(Switzerland) Lara Gut
2014–15	(Austria) Anna Fenninger (2)	(Slovenia) Tina Maze (2)	(United States) Lindsey Vonn
2015–16	(Switzerland) Lara Gut	(United States) Lindsey Vonn (2)	(Germany) Viktoria Rebensburg
2016–17	(United States) Mikaela Shiffrin	(Slovenia) Ilka Štuhec	(Italy) Sofia Goggia
2017–18	(United States) Mikaela Shiffrin	(Switzerland) Wendy Holdener	(Germany) Viktoria Rebensburg (2)
2018–19	(United States) Mikaela Shiffrin	(Slovakia) Petra Vlhová	(Switzerland) Wendy Holdener
2019–20	(Italy) Federica Brignone	(United States) Mikaela Shiffrin	(Slovakia) Petra Vlhová
2020–21	(Slovakia) Petra Vlhová	(Switzerland) Lara Gut-Behrami	(Switzerland) Michelle Gisin
2021–22	(United States) Mikaela Shiffrin	(Slovakia) Petra Vlhová (2)	(Italy) Federica Brignone
2022–23	(United States) Mikaela Shiffrin	(Switzerland) Lara Gut-Behrami	(Slovakia) Petra Vlhová (2)
2023–24	(Switzerland) Lara Gut-Behrami (2)	(Italy) Federica Brignone	(United States) Mikaela Shiffrin
2024–25	(Italy) Federica Brignone (2)	(Switzerland) Lara Gut-Behrami (3)	(Italy) Sofia Goggia (2)
2025–26	(United States) Mikaela Shiffrin (6)	(Germany) Emma Aicher	(Switzerland) Camille Rast

Statistics by country

Rank	Nation	Gold	Silver	Bronze	Total
1	Austria	17	13	9	39
2	Switzerland	13	12	14	39
3	United States	11	3	5	19
4	Germany	3	11	9	23
5	Sweden	3	2	3	8
6	Croatia	3	1	0	4
7	Liechtenstein	2	4	2	8
8	Italy	2	2	3	7
9	Canada	2	0	0	2
10	France	1	6	9	16
11	Slovenia	1	3	1	5
12	Slovakia	1	2	2	5
13	West Germany	1	1	3	5
Totals (13 entries)		60	60	60	180

=== Individual titles by country ===
Nation	Total	Men	Women
Austria	34	17	17
Switzerland	24	11	13
United States	16	5	11
Italy	8	6	2
Norway	6	6	–
Sweden	6	3	3
France	5	4	1
Luxembourg	5	5	–
Croatia	4	1	3
Germany	3	–	3
Liechtenstein	3	1	2
Canada	2	–	2
Slovakia	1	–	1
Slovenia	1	–	1
West Germany	1	–	1

=== Men overall titles ===
The following skiers have at least three overall alpine World Cup titles.

Name	Career	Overall	Disciplines				
Name	Career	Overall	DH	SG	GS	SL	KB
(Austria) Marcel Hirscher	2007–2019	8	–	–	6	6	–
(Luxembourg) Marc Girardelli	1980–1996	5	2	–	1	3	4
(Switzerland) Marco Odermatt	2016–active	5	3	4	4	–	–
(Italy) Gustav Thöni	1969–1980	4	–	N/A	3	2	–
(Switzerland) Pirmin Zurbriggen	1981–1990	4	2	4	1	–	3
(Austria) Hermann Maier	1996–2009	4	2	5	3	–	–
(United States) Phil Mahre	1975–1984	3	–	–	2	1	4
(Sweden) Ingemar Stenmark	1973–1989	3	–	N/A	7	8	–

=== Women overall titles ===
The following skiers have at least three overall alpine World Cup titles.

Name	Career	Overall	Disciplines				
Name	Career	Overall	DH	SG	GS	SL	KB
(Austria) Annemarie Moser-Pröll	1969–1980	6	7	N/A	3	–	
(United States) Mikaela Shiffrin	2011–active	6	–	1	2	9	–
(United States) Lindsey Vonn	2001–active	4	8	5	–	–	3
(Austria) Petra Kronberger	1987–1992	3	–	–	–	1	–
(Switzerland) Vreni Schneider	1984–1995	3	–	–	5	6	–
(Croatia) Janica Kostelić	1998–2006	3	–	–	–	3	4

== Discipline winners ==
=== Individual titles men ===
- The four main disciplines

Season	Slalom	Giant Slalom	Super-G	Downhill
1967	(France) Jean-Claude Killy	(France) Jean-Claude Killy	No competition	(France) Jean-Claude Killy
1968	(Switzerland) Dumeng Giovanoli	(France) Jean-Claude Killy (2)	No competition	(Austria) Gerhard Nenning
1968–69	(France) Patrick Russel, (Austria) Alfred Matt, (France) Alain Penz, (France) Jean-Noël Augert	(Austria) Karl Schranz	No competition	(Austria) Karl Schranz
1969–70	(France) Patrick Russel (2), (France) Alain Penz (2)	(Italy) Gustav Thöni	No competition	(Austria) Karl Schranz (2), (Austria) Karl Cordin
1970–71	(France) Jean-Noël Augert	(France) Patrick Russel, (Italy) Gustav Thöni	No competition	(Switzerland) Bernhard Russi
1971–72	(France) Jean-Noël Augert (3)	(Italy) Gustav Thöni (3)	No competition	(Switzerland) Bernhard Russi (2)
1972–73	(Italy) Gustav Thöni	(Austria) Hansi Hinterseer	No competition	(Switzerland) Roland Collombin
1973–74	(Italy) Gustav Thöni (2)	(Italy) Piero Gros	No competition	(Switzerland) Roland Collombin (2)
1974–75	(Sweden) Ingemar Stenmark	(Sweden) Ingemar Stenmark	No competition	(Austria) Franz Klammer
1975–76	(Sweden) Ingemar Stenmark	(Sweden) Ingemar Stenmark	No competition	(Austria) Franz Klammer
1975–76	(Sweden) Ingemar Stenmark	(Sweden) Ingemar Stenmark	No competition	(Austria) Franz Klammer
1977–78	(Sweden) Ingemar Stenmark	(Sweden) Ingemar Stenmark	No competition	(Austria) Franz Klammer
1978–79	(Sweden) Ingemar Stenmark	(Sweden) Ingemar Stenmark	No competition	(Switzerland) Peter Müller
1979–80	(Sweden) Ingemar Stenmark	(Sweden) Ingemar Stenmark	No competition	(Switzerland) Peter Müller (2)
1980–81	(Sweden) Ingemar Stenmark	(Sweden) Ingemar Stenmark	No competition	(Austria) Harti Weirather
1981–82	(United States) Phil Mahre	(United States) Phil Mahre	No competition	(Canada) Steve Podborski
1982–83	(Sweden) Ingemar Stenmark (8)	(United States) Phil Mahre (2)		(Austria) Franz Klammer (5)
1983–84	(Luxembourg) Marc Girardelli	(Sweden) Ingemar Stenmark (8)		(Switzerland) Urs Räber
1984–85	(Luxembourg) Marc Girardelli	(Luxembourg) Marc Girardelli		(Austria) Helmut Höflehner
1985–86	(Socialist Federal Republic of Yugoslavia) Rok Petrovič	(Switzerland) Joël Gaspoz	(West Germany) Markus Wasmeier	(Austria) Peter Wirnsberger
1986–87	(Socialist Federal Republic of Yugoslavia) Bojan Križaj	(Switzerland) Pirmin Zurbriggen	(Switzerland) Pirmin Zurbriggen	(Switzerland) Pirmin Zurbriggen
1987–88	(Italy) Alberto Tomba	(Italy) Alberto Tomba	(Switzerland) Pirmin Zurbriggen	(Switzerland) Pirmin Zurbriggen (2)
1988–89	(West Germany) Armin Bittner	(Norway) Ole Kristian Furuseth, (Switzerland) Pirmin Zurbriggen (2)	(Switzerland) Pirmin Zurbriggen	(Luxembourg) Marc Girardelli
1989–90	(West Germany) Armin Bittner (2)	(Norway) Ole Kristian Furuseth (2), (Austria) Günther Mader	(Switzerland) Pirmin Zurbriggen (4)	(Austria) Helmut Höflehner
1990–91	(Luxembourg) Marc Girardelli (3)	(Italy) Alberto Tomba	(Switzerland) Franz Heinzer	(Switzerland) Franz Heinzer
1991–92	(Italy) Alberto Tomba	(Italy) Alberto Tomba	(Switzerland) Paul Accola	(Switzerland) Franz Heinzer
1992–93	(Sweden) Thomas Fogdö	(Norway) Kjetil André Aamodt	(Norway) Kjetil André Aamodt	(Switzerland) Franz Heinzer (3)
1993–94	(Italy) Alberto Tomba	(Austria) Christian Mayer	(Norway) Jan Einar Thorsen	(Luxembourg) Marc Girardelli (2)
1994–95	(Italy) Alberto Tomba (3)	(Italy) Alberto Tomba (4)	(Italy) Peter Runggaldier	(France) Luc Alphand
1995–96	(France) Sébastien Amiez	(Switzerland) Michael von Grünigen	(Norway) Atle Skårdal	(France) Luc Alphand
1996–97	(Austria) Thomas Sykora	(Switzerland) Michael von Grünigen	(France) Luc Alphand	(France) Luc Alphand (3)
1997–98	(Austria) Thomas Sykora (2)	(Austria) Hermann Maier	(Austria) Hermann Maier	(Austria) Andreas Schifferer
1998–99	(Austria) Thomas Stangassinger	(Switzerland) Michael von Grünigen	(Austria) Hermann Maier	(Norway) Lasse Kjus
1999–2000	(Norway) Kjetil André Aamodt	(Austria) Hermann Maier	(Austria) Hermann Maier	(Austria) Hermann Maier
2000–01	(Austria) Benjamin Raich	(Austria) Hermann Maier (3)	(Austria) Hermann Maier	(Austria) Hermann Maier (2)
2001–02	(Croatia) Ivica Kostelić	(France) Frédéric Covili	(Austria) Stephan Eberharter	(Austria) Stephan Eberharter
2002–03	(Finland) Kalle Palander	(Switzerland) Michael von Grünigen (4)	(Austria) Stephan Eberharter (2)	(Austria) Stephan Eberharter
2003–04	(Austria) Rainer Schönfelder	(United States) Bode Miller	(Austria) Hermann Maier (5)	(Austria) Stephan Eberharter (3)
2004–05	(Austria) Benjamin Raich	(Austria) Benjamin Raich	(United States) Bode Miller	(Austria) Michael Walchofer
2005–06	(Italy) Giorgio Rocca	(Austria) Benjamin Raich	(Norway) Aksel Lund Svindal	(Austria) Michael Walchofer
2006–07	(Austria) Benjamin Raich (3)	(Austria) Benjamin Raich (3)	(Norway) Aksel Lund Svindal	(Austria) Michael Walchofer
2007–08	(Italy) Manfred Mölgg	(United States) Ted Ligety	(Austria) Hannes Reichelt	(Switzerland) Didier Cuche
2008–09	(France) Jean-Baptiste Grange	(Switzerland) Didier Cuche	(Norway) Aksel Lund Svindal	(Austria) Michael Walchofer (4)
2009–10	(Austria) Reinfried Herbst	(United States) Ted Ligety	(Canada) Erik Guay	(Switzerland) Didier Cuche
2010–11	(Croatia) Ivica Kostelić (2)	(United States) Ted Ligety	(Switzerland) Didier Cuche	(Switzerland) Didier Cuche (3)
2011–12	(Sweden) André Myhrer	(Austria) Marcel Hirscher	(Norway) Aksel Lund Svindal	(Austria) Klaus Kröll
2012–13	(Austria) Marcel Hirscher	(United States) Ted Ligety	(Norway) Aksel Lund Svindal	(Norway) Aksel Lund Svindal
2013–14	(Austria) Marcel Hirscher	(United States) Ted Ligety (5)	(Norway) Aksel Lund Svindal (6)	(Norway) Aksel Lund Svindal (2)
2014–15	(Austria) Marcel Hirscher	(Austria) Marcel Hirscher	(Norway) Kjetil Jansrud	(Norway) Kjetil Jansrud
2015–16	(Norway) Henrik Kristoffersen	(Austria) Marcel Hirscher	(Norway) Kjetil Jansrud	(Italy) Peter Fill
2016–17	(Austria) Marcel Hirscher	(Austria) Marcel Hirscher	(Norway) Kjetil Jansrud	(Italy) Peter Fill (2)
2017–18	(Austria) Marcel Hirscher	(Austria) Marcel Hirscher	(Norway) Kjetil Jansrud (4)	(Switzerland) Beat Feuz
2018–19	(Austria) Marcel Hirscher (6)	(Austria) Marcel Hirscher (6)	(Italy) Dominik Paris	(Switzerland) Beat Feuz
2019–20	(Norway) Henrik Kristoffersen	(Norway) Henrik Kristoffersen	(Switzerland) Mauro Caviezel	(Switzerland) Beat Feuz
2020–21	(Austria) Marco Schwarz	(France) Alexis Pinturault	(Austria) Vincent Kriechmayr	(Switzerland) Beat Feuz (4)
2021–22	(Norway) Henrik Kristoffersen	(Switzerland) Marco Odermatt	(Norway) Aleksander Aamodt Kilde	(Norway) Aleksander Aamodt Kilde
2022–23	(Norway) Lucas Braathen	(Switzerland) Marco Odermatt	(Switzerland) Marco Odermatt	(Norway) Aleksander Aamodt Kilde (2)
2023–24	(Austria) Manuel Feller	(Switzerland) Marco Odermatt	(Switzerland) Marco Odermatt	(Switzerland) Marco Odermatt
2024–25	(Norway) Henrik Kristoffersen (4)	(Switzerland) Marco Odermatt (4)	(Switzerland) Marco Odermatt	(Switzerland) Marco Odermatt
2025–26	(Norway) Atle Lie McGrath	(Brazil) Lucas Pinheiro Braathen	(Switzerland) Marco Odermatt (4)	(Switzerland) Marco Odermatt (3)

== Individual titles women ==
- The four main disciplines

Season	Slalom	Giant Slalom	Super-G	Downhill
1967	(France) Annie Famose	(Canada) Nancy Greene	No competition	(France) Marielle Goitschel
1968	(France) Marielle Goitschel	(Canada) Nancy Greene	No competition	(France) Isabelle Mir
1968–69	(Austria) Gertrude Gabl	(United States) Marilyn Cochran	No competition	(Austria) Wiltrud Drexel
1969–70	(France) Ingrid Lafforgue	(France) Françoise Macchi, (France) Michèle Jacot	No competition	(France) Isabelle Mir
1970–71	(France) Britt Lafforgue, (Canada) Betsy Clifford	(Austria) Annemarie Pröll	No competition	(Austria) Annemarie Pröll
1971–72	(France) Britt Lafforgue (2)	(Austria) Annemarie Pröll	No competition	(Austria) Annemarie Pröll
1972–73	(France) Patricia Emonet	(Austria) Monika Kaserer	No competition	(Austria) Annemarie Pröll
1973–74	(West Germany) Christa Zechmeister	(Liechtenstein) Hanni Wenzel	No competition	(Austria) Annemarie Pröll
1974–75	(Switzerland) Lise-Marie Morerod	(Austria) Annemarie Moser-Pröll (3)	No competition	(Austria) Annemarie Moser-Pröll
1975–76	(West Germany) Rosi Mittermaier	(Switzerland) Lise-Marie Morerod	No competition	(Austria) Brigitte Totschnig
1976–77	(Switzerland) Lise-Marie Morerod (2)	(Switzerland) Lise-Marie Morerod	No competition	(Austria) Brigitte Totschnig (2)
1977–78	(Liechtenstein) Hanni Wenzel	(Switzerland) Lise-Marie Morerod (3)	No competition	(Austria) Annemarie Moser-Pröll
1978–79	(Austria) Regina Sackl	(West Germany) Christa Kinshofer	No competition	(Austria) Annemarie Moser-Pröll (7)
1979–80	(France) Perrine Pelen	(Liechtenstein) Hanni Wenzel (2)	No competition	(Switzerland) Marie-Theres Nadig
1980–81	(Switzerland) Erika Hess	(United States) Tamara McKinney	No competition	(Switzerland) Marie-Theres Nadig (2)
1981–82	(Switzerland) Erika Hess	(West Germany) Irene Epple	No competition	(France) Marie-Cécile Gros-Gaudenier
1982–83	(Switzerland) Erika Hess	(United States) Tamara McKinney		(Switzerland) Doris de Agostini
1983–84	(United States) Tamara McKinney	(United States) Tamara McKinney (3)		(Switzerland) Maria Walliser
1984–85	(Switzerland) Erika Hess (4)	(West Germany) Marina Kiehl		(Switzerland) Michela Figini
1985–86	(Austria) Roswitha Steiner	(Switzerland) Vreni Schneider	(West Germany) Marina Kiehl	(Switzerland) Maria Walliser (2)
1986–87	(Switzerland) Corinne Schmidhauser	(Switzerland) Vreni Schneider, (Switzerland) Maria Walliser	(Switzerland) Maria Walliser	(Switzerland) Michela Figini
1987–88	(Austria) Roswitha Steiner (2)	(Socialist Federal Republic of Yugoslavia) Mateja Svet	(Switzerland) Michela Figini	(Switzerland) Michela Figini
1988–89	(Switzerland) Vreni Schneider	(Switzerland) Vreni Schneider	(France) Carole Merle	(Switzerland) Michela Figini (4)
1989–90	(Switzerland) Vreni Schneider	(Austria) Anita Wachter	(France) Carole Merle	(West Germany) Katharina Gutensohn
1990–91	(Austria) Petra Kronberger	(Switzerland) Vreni Schneider	(France) Carole Merle	(Switzerland) Chantal Bournissen
1991–92	(Switzerland) Vreni Schneider	(France) Carole Merle	(France) Carole Merle (4)	(Germany) Katja Seizinger
1992–93	(Switzerland) Vreni Schneider	(France) Carole Merle (2)	(Germany) Katja Seizinger	(Germany) Katja Seizinger
1993–94	(Switzerland) Vreni Schneider	(Austria) Anita Wachter (2)	(Germany) Katja Seizinger	(Germany) Katja Seizinger
1994–95	(Switzerland) Vreni Schneider (6)	(Switzerland) Vreni Schneider (5)	(Germany) Katja Seizinger	(United States) Picabo Street
1995–96	(Austria) Elfi Eder	(Germany) Martina Ertl	(Germany) Katja Seizinger	(United States) Picabo Street (2)
1996–97	(Sweden) Pernilla Wiberg	(Italy) Deborah Compagnoni	(Germany) Hilde Gerg	(Austria) Renate Götschl
1997–98	(Sweden) Ylva Nowén	(Germany) Martina Ertl (2)	(Germany) Katja Seizinger (5)	(Germany) Katja Seizinger (4)
1998–99	(Austria) Sabine Egger	(Austria) Alexandra Meissnitzer	(Austria) Alexandra Meissnitzer	(Austria) Renate Götschl
1999–2000	(Slovenia) Špela Pretnar	(Austria) Michaela Dorfmeister	(Austria) Renate Götschl	(Germany) Regina Häusl
2000–01	(Croatia) Janica Kostelić	(Switzerland) Sonja Nef	(France) Régine Cavagnoud	(Italy) Isolde Kostner
2001–02	(France) Laure Pequegnot	(Switzerland) Sonja Nef (2)	(Germany) Hilde Gerg (2)	(Italy) Isolde Kostner (2)
2002–03	(Croatia) Janica Kostelić	(Sweden) Anja Pärson	(France) Carole Montillet	(Austria) Michaela Dorfmeister
2003–04	(Sweden) Anja Pärson	(Sweden) Anja Pärson	(Austria) Renate Götschl	(Austria) Renate Götschl
2004–05	(Finland) Tanja Poutiainen	(Finland) Tanja Poutiainen	(Austria) Michaela Dorfmeister	(Austria) Renate Götschl
2005–06	(Croatia) Janica Kostelić (3)	(Sweden) Anja Pärson (3)	(Austria) Michaela Dorfmeister (2)	(Austria) Michaela Dorfmeister (2)
2006–07	(Austria) Marlies Schild	(Austria) Nicole Hosp	(Austria) Renate Götschl (3)	(Austria) Renate Götschl (5)
2007–08	(Austria) Marlies Schild	(Italy) Denise Karbon	(Germany) Maria Riesch	(United States) Lindsey Vonn
2008–09	(Germany) Maria Riesch	(Finland) Tanja Poutiainen (2)	(United States) Lindsey Vonn	(United States) Lindsey Vonn
2009–10	(Germany) Maria Riesch (2)	(Germany) Kathrin Hölzl	(United States) Lindsey Vonn	(United States) Lindsey Vonn
2010–11	(Austria) Marlies Schild	(Germany) Viktoria Rebensburg	(United States) Lindsey Vonn	(United States) Lindsey Vonn
2011–12	(Austria) Marlies Schild (4)	(Germany) Viktoria Rebensburg	(United States) Lindsey Vonn	(United States) Lindsey Vonn
2012–13	(United States) Mikaela Shiffrin	(Slovenia) Tina Maze	(Slovenia) Tina Maze	(United States) Lindsey Vonn
2013–14	(United States) Mikaela Shiffrin	(Austria) Anna Fenninger	(Switzerland) Lara Gut	(Germany) Maria Höfl-Riesch
2014–15	(United States) Mikaela Shiffrin	(Austria) Anna Fenninger (2)	(United States) Lindsey Vonn (5)	(United States) Lindsey Vonn
2015–16	(Sweden) Frida Hansdotter	(Austria) Eva-Maria Brem	(Switzerland) Lara Gut	(United States) Lindsey Vonn (8)
2016–17	(United States) Mikaela Shiffrin	(France) Tessa Worley	(Liechtenstein) Tina Weirather	(Slovenia) Ilka Štuhec
2017–18	(United States) Mikaela Shiffrin	(Germany) Viktoria Rebensburg (3)	(Liechtenstein) Tina Weirather (2)	(Italy) Sofia Goggia
2018–19	(United States) Mikaela Shiffrin	(United States) Mikaela Shiffrin	(United States) Mikaela Shiffrin	(Austria) Nicole Schmidhofer
2019–20	(Slovakia) Petra Vlhová	(Italy) Federica Brignone	(Switzerland) Corinne Suter	(Switzerland) Corinne Suter
2020–21	(Austria) Katharina Liensberger	(Italy) Marta Bassino	(Switzerland) Lara Gut-Behrami	(Italy) Sofia Goggia
2021–22	(Slovakia) Petra Vlhová (2)	(France) Tessa Worley (2)	(Italy) Federica Brignone	(Italy) Sofia Goggia
2022–23	(United States) Mikaela Shiffrin	(United States) Mikaela Shiffrin (2)	(Switzerland) Lara Gut-Behrami	(Italy) Sofia Goggia (4)
2023–24	(United States) Mikaela Shiffrin	(Switzerland) Lara Gut-Behrami	(Switzerland) Lara Gut-Behrami	(Austria) Cornelia Hütter
2024–25	(Croatia) Zrinka Ljutić	(Italy) Federica Brignone (2)	(Switzerland) Lara Gut-Behrami (6)	(Italy) Federica Brignone
2025–26	(United States) Mikaela Shiffrin (9)	(Austria) Julia Scheib	(Italy) Sofia Goggia	(Italy) Laura Pirovano

=== Top ten small crystal globe podiums ===
Still active

==== Men ====
#	Skier	Period	1st	2nd	3rd
1	(Sweden) Ingemar Stenmark	1975–1987	15	7	1
2	(Austria) Marcel Hirscher	2012–2019	12	3	1
3	(Switzerland) Marco Odermatt	2020–active	11	4	1
4	(Luxembourg) Marc Girardelli	1982–1996	10	5	6
5	(Switzerland) Pirmin Zurbriggen	1983–1990	10	5	3
5	(Austria) Hermann Maier	1998–2006	10	5	3
7	(Norway) Aksel Lund Svindal	2006–2019	9	3	3
8	(Italy) Alberto Tomba	1988–1996	8	5	0
9	(Austria) Benjamin Raich	2001–2010	8	4	5
10	(Norway) Kjetil André Aamodt	1993–2003	8	4	2

==== Women ====
#	Skier	Period	1st	2nd	3rd
1	(United States) Lindsey Vonn	2001–active	16	5	6
2	(United States) Mikaela Shiffrin	2011–active	12	6	5
3	(Austria) Annemarie Moser-Pröll	1969–1980	12	5	5
4	(Switzerland) Vreni Schneider	1984–1995	11	5	3
5	(Austria) Renate Götschl	1993–2009	10	9	3
6	(Germany) Katja Seizinger	1989–1999	9	5	2
7	(Liechtenstein) Hanni Wenzel	1972–1984	7	6	4
8	(Switzerland) Lara Gut-Behrami	2008–active	7	4	4
9	(Croatia) Janica Kostelić	1998–2007	7	2	2
10	(Italy) Federica Brignone	2010-active	6	7	3

=== Most small globes per discipline ===
Combined crystal globes were officially awarded from 2007 to 2012. Here are counted all season titles, official and unofficial. The records for most World Cup titles in each discipline are as follows:

==== Men ====
Discipline		Country	Titles
Downhill	Franz Klammer	Austria	5
Super-G	Hermann Maier	Austria	5
Super-G	Aksel Lund Svindal	Norway	5
Giant slalom	Ingemar Stenmark	Sweden	7
Slalom	Ingemar Stenmark	Sweden	8
Combined	Alexis Pinturault	France	6

==== Women ====
Discipline		Country	Titles
Downhill	Lindsey Vonn	United States	8
Super-G	Lara Gut-Behrami	Switzerland	6
Giant slalom	Vreni Schneider	Switzerland	5
Slalom	Mikaela Shiffrin	United States	9
Combined	Brigitte Oertli	Switzerland	4
Combined	Janica Kostelić	Croatia	4

=== Multiple disciplines small crystal globe winners ===
Only four men's and three women's racers have ever managed to win a small crystal globe in four or more different alpine skiing disciplines during their career, as listed in the tables below.

==== Men ====
	Career	Different discipline titles won	Wins	DH	SG	GS	SL	KB
(Luxembourg) Marc Girardelli	1980–1997	4	10	2	-	1	3	4
(Switzerland) Pirmin Zurbriggen	1981–1990	4	10	2	4	1	-	3
(Norway) Aksel Lund Svindal	2003-2019	4	9	2	5	1	-	1
(Norway) Kjetil André Aamodt	1990–2006	4	8	-	1	1	1	5

==== Women ====
	Career	Different discipline titles won	Wins	DH	SG	GS	SL	KB
(Switzerland) Maria Walliser	1981–1990	4	5	2	1	1	-	1
(Germany) Maria Höfl-Riesch	2001–2014	4	5	1	1	-	2	1
(Italy) Federica Brignone	2010–active	4	5	1	1	2	-	1

== Wins ==
=== Most race wins in each discipline ===
As of 26 Mar 2026

==== Men ====
Rank	Downhill	Wins
1	(Austria) Franz Klammer	25
2	(Italy) Dominik Paris	20
3	(Switzerland) Peter Müller	19
4	(Austria) Stephan Eberharter	18
5	(Switzerland) Franz Heinzer	15
5	(Austria) Hermann Maier	15

Rank	Super-G	Wins
1	(Austria) Hermann Maier	24
2	(Norway) Aksel Lund Svindal	17
	(Switzerland) Marco Odermatt	17
4	(Norway) Kjetil Jansrud	13
5	(Switzerland) Pirmin Zurbriggen	10
5	(Austria) Vincent Kriechmayr	10

Rank	Giant slalom	Wins
1	(Sweden) Ingemar Stenmark	46
2	(Austria) Marcel Hirscher	31
3	(Switzerland) Marco Odermatt	29
4	(United States) Ted Ligety	24
5	(Switzerland) Michael von Grünigen	23

Rank	Slalom	Wins
1	(Sweden) Ingemar Stenmark	40
2	(Italy) Alberto Tomba	35
3	(Austria) Marcel Hirscher	32
4	(Norway) Henrik Kristoffersen	26
5	(Luxembourg) Marc Girardelli	16

Rank	Combined	Wins
1	(United States) Phil Mahre	11
1	(Switzerland) Pirmin Zurbriggen	11
1	(Luxembourg) Marc Girardelli	11
4	(France) Alexis Pinturault	10
5	(Croatia) Ivica Kostelić	9

=== Women ===
Rank	Downhill	Wins
1	(United States) Lindsey Vonn	45
2	(Austria) Annemarie Moser-Pröll	36
3	(Austria) Renate Götschl	24
4	(Italy) Sofia Goggia	19
5	(Switzerland) Michela Figini	17

Rank	Super-G	Wins
1	(United States) Lindsey Vonn	28
2	(Switzerland) Lara Gut-Behrami	24
3	(Austria) Renate Götschl	17
4	(Germany) Katja Seizinger	16
5	(Italy) Federica Brignone	13

Rank	Giant slalom	Wins
1	(United States) Mikaela Shiffrin	22
2	(Switzerland) Vreni Schneider	20
3	(Italy) Federica Brignone	17
4	(Austria) Annemarie Moser-Pröll	16
4	(France) Tessa Worley	16

Rank	Slalom	Wins
1	(United States) Mikaela Shiffrin	73
2	(Austria) Marlies Schild	35
3	(Switzerland) Vreni Schneider	34
4	(Slovakia) Petra Vlhová	22
5	(Switzerland) Erika Hess	21

Rank	Combined	Wins
1	(Liechtenstein) Hanni Wenzel	8
2	(Austria) Annemarie Moser-Pröll	7
2	(Switzerland) Brigitte Oertli	7
4	(Croatia) Janica Kostelić	6
5	(Switzerland) Marie-Theres Nadig	5
5	(United States) Lindsey Vonn	5
5	(Italy) Federica Brignone	5

=== Most races won ===
The following skiers have won at least 20 World Cup races:

==== Men ====
Rank	Men	Career	Wins	DH	SG	GS	SL	KB	PSL	CE	PGS	K.O.
1	(Sweden) Ingemar Stenmark	1973–1989	86	–	–	46	40	–	–	N/A	N/A	N/A
2	(Austria) Marcel Hirscher	2007–2019	67	–	1	31	32	–	N/A	2	1	N/A
3	(Austria) Hermann Maier	1996–2009	54	15	24	14	–	1	–	N/A	N/A	–
	(Switzerland) Marco Odermatt	2016–active	54	8	17	29	–	–	–	–	–	N/A
5	(Italy) Alberto Tomba	1986–1998	50	–	–	15	35	–	–	N/A	N/A	N/A
6	(Luxembourg) Marc Girardelli	1980–1996	46	3	9	7	16	11	–	N/A	N/A	N/A
7	(Switzerland) Pirmin Zurbriggen	1981–1990	40	10	10	7	2	11	–	N/A	N/A	N/A
8	(Austria) Benjamin Raich	1996–2015	36	–	1	14	14	7	–	–	N/A	–
	(Norway) Aksel Lund Svindal	2001–2019	36	14	17	4	–	1	–	–	–	–
10	(France) Alexis Pinturault	2009–2026	34	–	1	18	3	10	N/A	1	1	N/A
	(Norway) Henrik Kristoffersen	2012–active	34	–	–	8	26	–	–	–	–	NA
12	(United States) Bode Miller	1997–2017	33	8	5	9	5	6	–	–	–	–
13	(Austria) Stephan Eberharter	1989–2004	29	18	6	5	–	–	–	N/A	N/A	–
14	(United States) Phil Mahre	1975–1984	27	–	–	7	9	11	–	N/A	N/A	N/A
15	(Austria) Franz Klammer	1972–1985	26	25	–	–	–	1	–	N/A	N/A	N/A
	(Croatia) Ivica Kostelić	1998–2017	26	–	1	–	14	9	–	1	–	1
	(Italy) Dominik Paris	2008–active	26	20	6	–	–	–	–	–	–	N/A
18	(United States) Ted Ligety	2004–2021	25	–	–	24	–	1	–	–	–	N/A
19	(Italy) Gustav Thöni	1969–1980	24	–	N/A	11	8	4	1	N/A	N/A	N/A
	(Switzerland) Peter Müller	1977–1992	24	19	2	–	–	3	N/A	N/A	N/A	N/A
21	(Switzerland) Michael von Grünigen	1989–2003	23	–	–	23	–	–	–	N/A	N/A	–
	(Norway) Kjetil Jansrud	2003–2022	23	8	13	–	–	1	–	–	1	–
23	(Norway) Kjetil André Aamodt	1989–2006	21	1	5	6	1	8	–	N/A	N/A	–
	(Switzerland) Didier Cuche	1993–2012	21	12	6	3	–	–	–	–	N/A	–
	(Norway) A. Aamodt Kilde	2013–active	21	12	9	–	–	–	–	–	–	N/A
26	(Austria) Vincent Kriechmayr	2011–active	20	10	10	–	–	–	–	–	–	N/A

update: 25 March 2026

==== Women ====
Rank	Women	Career	Wins	DH	SG	GS	SL	KB	PSL	CE	PGS	K.O.
1	(United States) Mikaela Shiffrin	2011–active	110	4	5	22	73	1	2	3	–	N/A
2	(United States) Lindsey Vonn	2001–active	84	45	28	4	2	5	–	–	N/A	
3	(Austria) Annemarie Moser-Pröll	1969–1980	62	36	N/A	16	3	7	–	N/A	N/A	N/A
4	(Switzerland) Vreni Schneider	1984–1995	55	–	–	20	34	1	–	N/A	N/A	N/A
5	(Switzerland) Lara Gut-Behrami	2008–active	48	13	24	10	–	1	–	–	–	N/A
6	(Austria) Renate Götschl	1993–2009	46	24	17	–	1	4	–	N/A	N/A	–
7	(Sweden) Anja Pärson	1998–2012	42	6	4	11	17	3	–	–	N/A	1
8	(Austria) Marlies Schild	2001–2014	37	–	–	1	35	1	–	–	N/A	–
	(Italy) Federica Brignone	2008–active	37	2	13	17	–	5	–	–	–	N/A
10	(Germany) Katja Seizinger	1989–1998	36	16	16	4	–	–	–	N/A	N/A	N/A
11	(Liechtenstein) Hanni Wenzel	1972–1984	33	2	–	12	11	8	–	N/A	N/A	N/A
12	(Switzerland) Erika Hess	1978–1987	31	–	–	6	21	4	–	N/A	N/A	N/A
	(Slovakia) Petra Vlhová	2013–active	31	–	–	6	22	–	1	1	1	N/A
14	(Croatia) Janica Kostelić	1998–2006	30	1	1	2	20	6	–	N/A	N/A	–
15	(Italy) Sofia Goggia	2012–active	29	19	10	–	–	–	–	–	–	N/A
16	(Germany) Maria Höfl-Riesch	2001–2014	27	11	3	–	9	4	–	–	N/A	–
17	(Switzerland) Michela Figini	1983–1990	26	17	3	2	–	4	–	N/A	N/A	N/A
	(Slovenia) Tina Maze	1999–2015	26	4	1	14	4	3	–	–	N/A	–
19	(Switzerland) Maria Walliser	1980–1990	25	14	3	6	–	2	–	N/A	N/A	N/A
	(Austria) Michaela Dorfmeister	1991–2006	25	7	10	8	–	–	–	N/A	N/A	–
21	(Switzerland) Lise-Marie Morerod	1973–1980	24	–	N/A	14	10	–	–	N/A	N/A	N/A
	(Switzerland) Marie-Theres Nadig	1971–1981	24	13	N/A	6	–	5	–	N/A	N/A	N/A
	(Sweden) Pernilla Wiberg	1990–2002	24	2	3	2	14	3	–	N/A	N/A	N/A
24	(France) Carole Merle	1981–1994	22	–	12	10	–	–	–	N/A	N/A	N/A
25	(Germany) Hilde Gerg	1993–2005	20	7	8	–	1	3	1	N/A	N/A	–

=== Twenty or more speed and technical wins ===
==== Speed events ====
As of 21 March 2026

Rank	Men	Wins (DH + SG)
1	(Austria) Hermann Maier	39
2	(Norway) Aksel Lund Svindal	31
3	(Italy) Dominik Paris	26
4	(Austria) Franz Klammer	25*
	(Switzerland) Marco Odermatt	25
6	(Austria) Stephan Eberharter	24
7	(Switzerland) Peter Müller	21
	(Norway) Kjetil Jansrud	21
	(Norway) Aleksander Aamodt Kilde	21
10	(Switzerland) Pirmin Zurbriggen	20

Rank	Women	Wins (DH + SG)
1	(United States) Lindsey Vonn	73
2	(Austria) Renate Götschl	41
3	(Switzerland) Lara Gut-Behrami	37
4	(Austria) Annemarie Moser-Pröll	36*
5	(Germany) Katja Seizinger	32
6	(Italy) Sofia Goggia	29
7	(Switzerland) Michela Figini	20
8	(Switzerland) Maria Walliser	17
	(Austria) Michaela Dorfmeister	17
10	(Germany) Hilde Gerg	15
	(Italy) Isolde Kostner	15
	(Italy) Federica Brignone	15

- NOTE: Super G not contested at that time.
- NOTE: Parallel events are not included in the list as slalom wins.

==== Technical events ====
As of 26 March 2026

Rank	Men	Wins (GS + SL)
1	(Sweden) Ingemar Stenmark	86
2	(Austria) Marcel Hirscher	63
3	(Italy) Alberto Tomba	50
4	(Norway) Henrik Kristoffersen	34
5	(Switzerland) Marco Odermatt	29
6	(Austria) Benjamin Raich	28
7	(United States) Ted Ligety	24
8	(Luxembourg) Marc Girardelli	23
	(Switzerland) Michael von Grünigen	23
10	(France) Alexis Pinturault	21

Rank	Women	Wins (GS + SL)
1	(United States) Mikaela Shiffrin	95
2	(Switzerland) Vreni Schneider	54
3	(Austria) Marlies Schild	36
4	(Sweden) Anja Pärson	29
5	(Slovakia) Petra Vlhová	28
6	(Switzerland) Erika Hess	27
7	(Switzerland) Lise-Marie Morerod	24
8	(Liechtenstein) Hanni Wenzel	23
9	(Croatia) Janica Kostelić	22

=== All-event winners ===
Only a few racers have ever managed to win races in all five classic World Cup alpine skiing disciplines during their career, as listed in the table below. Marc Girardelli (1988–89), Petra Kronberger (1990–91), Janica Kostelić (2005–06) and Tina Maze (2012–13) are the only skiers to have won all five events in a single season. Bode Miller is the only skier with at least five World Cup victories in all five disciplines. Alpine combined was dropped from the World Cup circuit in the 2020–21 season and, as such, no longer counts toward the total number of wins across all disciplines.

==== Men ====
	Career	Times	Seasons	Wins	DH	SG	GS	SL	KB	PGS	PSL	CE
(United States) Bode Miller	1997–2017	5	0	33	8	5	9	5	6	–	–	–
(Luxembourg) Marc Girardelli	1980–1996	3	1	46	3	9	7	16	11	N/A	–	N/A
(Switzerland) Pirmin Zurbriggen	1981–1990	2	0	40	10	10	7	2	11	N/A	–	N/A
(Norway) Kjetil André Aamodt	1989–2006	1	0	21	1	5	6	1	8	N/A	–	N/A
(Austria) Günther Mader	1982–1998	1	0	14	1	6	2	1	4	N/A	–	N/A

==== Women ====
	Career	Times	Seasons	Wins	DH	SG	GS	SL	KB	PGS	PSL	CE
(United States) Mikaela Shiffrin	2011–active	4	0	110	4	5	22	73	1	–	2	3
(Sweden) Anja Pärson	1998–2012	4	0	42	6	4	11	18	3	N/A	–	–
(United States) Lindsey Vonn	2001–active	2	0	84	45	28	4	2	5	N/A	–	–
(Sweden) Pernilla Wiberg	1990–2002	2	0	24	2	3	2	14	3	N/A	–	N/A
(Austria) Petra Kronberger	1987–1992	2	1	16	6	2	3	3	2	N/A	N/A	N/A
(Croatia) Janica Kostelić	1998–2006	1	1	30	1	1	2	20	6	N/A	–	N/A
(Slovenia) Tina Maze	1999–2015	1	1	26	4	1	14	4	3	N/A	–	–

- Mikaela Shiffrin is the only skier in history who has won in six different disciplines—i.e., aside from the classic five disciplines, she has also won in parallel slalom.

=== Most race wins in a single season ===
The following skiers have won at least ten World Cup races in a single season (events not available in a given season are marked "NA"):

==== Men ====
	Season	Wins	DH	SG	GS	SL	KB
(Sweden) Ingemar Stenmark	1978–1979	13	–	NA	10	3	–
(Austria) Hermann Maier	2000–2001	13	5	3	5	–	–
(Austria) Marcel Hirscher	2017–2018	13	—	—	6	7	–
(Switzerland) Marco Odermatt	2022–2023	13	–	6	7	–	NA
(Switzerland) Marco Odermatt	2023–2024	13	2	2	9	–	NA
(France) Jean-Claude Killy	1967	12	5	NA	4	3	NA
(Sweden) Ingemar Stenmark	1979–1980	11	–	NA	6	5	–
(Luxembourg) Marc Girardelli	1984–1985	11	–	2	2	7	–
(Switzerland) Pirmin Zurbriggen	1986–1987	11	5	1	3	–	2
(Italy) Alberto Tomba	1994–1995	11	–	–	4	7	–
(Sweden) Ingemar Stenmark	1976–1977	10	–	NA	3	7	–
(Sweden) Ingemar Stenmark	1980–1981	10	–	NA	6	4	–
(Austria) Hermann Maier	1997–1998	10	2	4	3	–	1
(Austria) Hermann Maier	1999–2000	10	3	4	3	–	–
(Austria) Stephan Eberharter	2001–2002	10	6	3	1	–	–

==== Women ====
	Season	Wins	DH	SG	GS	SL	KB	PSL+CE
(United States) Mikaela Shiffrin	2018–2019	17	–	3	4	8	–	2
(United States) Mikaela Shiffrin	2022–2023	14	–	1	7	6	NA	NA
(Switzerland) Vreni Schneider	1988–1989	14	–	–	6	7	1	–
(United States) Lindsey Vonn	2011–2012	12	5	4	2	–	1	NA
(United States) Mikaela Shiffrin	2017–2018	12	1	–	2	7	–	2
(Austria) Annemarie Moser-Pröll	1972–1973	11	8	NA	3	–	NA	NA
(Sweden) Anja Pärson	2003–2004	11	–	–	5	6	–	NA
(United States) Lindsey Vonn	2009–2010	11	6	4	–	–	1	NA
(Slovenia) Tina Maze	2012–2013	11	1	1	5	2	2	–
(United States) Mikaela Shiffrin	2016–2017	11	–	–	3	6	1	1
(Austria) Annemarie Moser-Pröll	1974–1975	10	2	NA	5	–	3	–
(Italy) Federica Brignone	2024–2025	10	2	3	5	–	NA	NA

== Hosts ==
=== Men's ===
==== Total ====
Rank	Host	Events
1	(Austria) Kitzbühel	192
2	(Switzerland) Wengen	135
3	(France) Val d'Isere	105
4	(Italy) Val Gardena	97
5	(Germany) Garmisch-Partenkirchen	93
6	(Slovenia) Kranjska Gora	91
7	(Switzerland) Adelboden	79
8	(United States) Beaver Creek	76
9	(Norway) Kvitfjell	71
10	(Italy) Madonna di Campiglio	58

==== Downhill ====
Rank	Host	Events
1	(Austria) Kitzbühel	71
2	(Italy) Val Gardena	65
3	(Switzerland) Wengen	53
4	(Norway) Kvitfjell	41
5	(Germany) Garmisch-Partenkirchen	40

==== Super-G ====
Rank	Host	Events
1	(Norway) Kvitfjell	29
2	(United States) Beaver Creek	24
	(Italy) Val Gardena	24
4	(Germany) Garmisch-Partenkirchen	23
	(Austria) Kitzbühel	23

==== Giant slalom ====
Rank	Host	Events
1	(Switzerland) Adelboden	55
2	(Slovenia) Kranjska Gora	48
3	(Italy) Alta Badia	43
4	(France) Val d'Isere	35
5	(Austria) Sölden	25

==== Slalom ====
Rank	Host	Events
1	(Austria) Kitzbühel	59
2	(Switzerland) Wengen	47
3	(Italy) Madonna di Campiglio	43
	(Slovenia) Kranjska Gora	43
5	(Austria) Schladming	32

Updated: 15 November 2026

=== Women's ===
==== Total ====
Rank	Host	Events
1	(Italy) Cortina d'Ampezzo	104
2	(France) Val d'Isere	93
3	(Canada) Lake Louise	85
4	(Sweden) Åre	74
5	(Slovenia) Maribor	68
6	(Switzerland) St. Moritz	57
7	(United States) Aspen	45
8	(Germany) Garmisch-Partenkirchen	41
9	(Switzerland) Crans-Montana	39
10	(Austria) Altenmarkt-Zauchensee	37

==== Downhill ====
Rank	Host	Events
1	(Canada) Lake Louise	55
2	(Italy) Cortina d'Ampezzo	45
3	(France) Val d'Isere	36
4	(Switzerland) St. Moritz	21
5	(Switzerland) Crans-Montana	17

==== Super-G ====
Rank	Host	Events
1	(Italy) Cortina d'Ampezzo	37
2	(Canada) Lake Louise	28
3	(Switzerland) St. Moritz	22
4	(France) Val d'Isere	21
5	(Germany) Garmisch-Partenkirchen	18

==== Giant slalom ====
Rank	Host	Events
1	(Slovenia) Maribor	29
2	(Austria) Sölden	28
3	(Sweden) Åre	27
4	(France) Val d'Isere	19
5	(United States) Aspen	17

==== Slalom ====
Rank	Host	Events
1	(Slovenia) Maribor	37
2	(Finland) Levi	26
3	(Sweden) Åre	25
4	(United States) Aspen	18
	(Austria) Semmering	18
	(Austria) Flachau	18

== Most podiums and top ten results ==
As of 24 March 2026.

Still active

=== Career podiums ===
Rank	Men	1st	2nd	3rd	Total
1	(Sweden) Ingemar Stenmark	86	43	26	155
2	(Austria) Marcel Hirscher	67	47	24	138
3	(Switzerland) Marco Odermatt	54	30	19	103
4	(Norway) Henrik Kristoffersen	34	38	30	102
5	(Luxembourg) Marc Girardelli	46	28	26	100
6	(Austria) Hermann Maier	54	21	21	96
7	(Austria) Benjamin Raich	36	29	27	92
8	(Italy) Alberto Tomba	50	26	12	88
9	(Switzerland) Pirmin Zurbriggen	40	26	17	83
10	(Norway) Aksel Lund Svindal	36	19	25	80

Rank	Women	1st	2nd	3rd	Total
1	(United States) Mikaela Shiffrin	110	28	30	168
2	(United States) Lindsey Vonn	84	38	23	145
3	(Austria) Annemarie Moser-Pröll	62	32	19	113
4	(Austria) Renate Götschl	46	37	27	110
5	(Switzerland) Lara Gut-Behrami	48	28	25	101
5	(Switzerland) Vreni Schneider	55	28	18	101
7	(Sweden) Anja Pärson	42	29	24	95
8	(Liechtenstein) Hanni Wenzel	33	25	31	89
9	(Italy) Federica Brignone	37	27	21	85
10	(Germany) Maria Höfl-Riesch	27	27	27	81
10	(Slovenia) Tina Maze	26	28	27	81

=== Career top ten results ===
Rank	Men	Top 10s
1	(Norway) Kjetil André Aamodt	233
2	(Austria) Benjamin Raich	227
3	(Luxembourg) Marc Girardelli	212
4	(Sweden) Ingemar Stenmark	205
5	(Norway) Henrik Kristoffersen	192
6	(France) Alexis Pinturault	188
7	(Switzerland) Didier Cuche	186
8	(Norway) Aksel Lund Svindal	181
9	(Austria) Marcel Hirscher	179
10	(Switzerland) Pirmin Zurbriggen	170

Rank	Women	Top 10s
1	(United States) Mikaela Shiffrin	246
2	(United States) Lindsey Vonn	225
3	(Switzerland) Lara Gut-Behrami	217
4	(Austria) Renate Götschl	198
5	(Sweden) Anja Pärson	196
6	(Liechtenstein) Hanni Wenzel	189
7	(Germany) Martina Ertl	188
8	(Italy) Federica Brignone	187
9	(Germany) Maria Höfl-Riesch	175
10	(Austria) Annemarie Moser-Pröll	172
10	(Slovenia) Tina Maze	172

- Note: Only parallel events from (1975, 1997, 2011–2013, 2016) which count for overall ranking, included on this list, are considered as official individual World Cup victories.

== Greatest alpine skiers of all time ==
Based on ski-database super ranking system (since 1966), this scoring system is calculated using points from three categories: Olympic Games, World Championships, and World Cup (overall titles, discipline titles and individual top ten results).

As of 26 Mar 2026

=== Men's super ranking ===
#	Overall	Points
1	(Austria) Marcel Hirscher	359.40
2	(Sweden) Ingemar Stenmark	290.10
3	(Switzerland) Marco Odermatt	253.50
4	(Austria) Hermann Maier	252.10
5	(Luxembourg) Marc Girardelli	227.50
6	(Norway) Aksel Lund Svindal	224.00
7	(Switzerland) Pirmin Zurbriggen	211.20
8	(Norway) Kjetil André Aamodt	201.45
9	(Italy) Alberto Tomba	195.60
10	(United States) Bode Miller	176.15

#	Downhill	Points
1	(Austria) Franz Klammer	76.3
2	(Switzerland) Beat Feuz	73.9
3	(Norway) Aksel Lund Svindal	72.0
4	(Switzerland) Peter Müller	66.0
5	(Switzerland) Bernhard Russi	54.5
6	(Austria) Michael Walchhofer	53.6
7	(Switzerland) Pirmin Zurbriggen	51.4
8	(Switzerland) Didier Cuche	49.8
9	(Switzerland) Franz Heinzer	48.9
10	(Austria) Stephan Eberharter	43.5

#	Super-G	Points
1	(Austria) Hermann Maier	88.2
2	(Norway) Kjetil André Aamodt	68.9
3	(Norway) Aksel Lund Svindal	67.3
4	(Norway) Kjetil Jansrud	55.0
5	(Switzerland) Marco Odermatt	52.4
6	(Austria) Stephan Eberharter	47.6
7	(Switzerland) Pirmin Zurbriggen	45.9
8	(Austria) Matthias Mayer	40.6
9	(United States) Bode Miller	38.4
10	(Austria) Vincent Kriechmayr	35.6

#	Giant slalom	Points
1	(Sweden) Ingemar Stenmark	120.0
2	(Austria) Marcel Hirscher	104.1
3	(United States) Ted Ligety	97.3
4	(Switzerland) Marco Odermatt	83.8
5	(Italy) Alberto Tomba	80.9
6	(Switzerland) Michael von Grünigen	73.7
7	(Austria) Hermann Maier	59.8
8	(Austria) Benjamin Raich	57.0
9	(Italy) Gustav Thöni	55.0
10	(France) Alexis Pinturault	43.5

#	Slalom	Points
1	(Sweden) Ingemar Stenmark	124.8
2	(Austria) Marcel Hirscher	105.8
3	(Italy) Alberto Tomba	98.5
4	(Norway) Henrik Kristoffersen	75.2
5	(Austria) Benjamin Raich	69.6
6	(Austria) Mario Matt	55.8
7	(Luxembourg) Marc Girardelli	52.8
8	(Croatia) Ivica Kostelić	50.2
9	(Italy) Gustav Thöni	47.0
10	(Austria) Thomas Stangassinger	46.4

=== Women's super ranking ===
#	Overall	Points
1	(United States) Mikaela Shiffrin	411.70
2	(United States) Lindsey Vonn	301.00
3	(Austria) A. Moser-Pröll	272.50
4	(Switzerland) Vreni Schneider	255.10
5	(Sweden) Anja Pärson	217.40
6	(Croatia) Janica Kostelić	203.65
7	(Germany) Katja Seizinger	194.40
8	(Switzerland) Lara Gut-Behrami	194.00
9	(Italy) Federica Brignone	185.40
10	(Slovenia) Tina Maze	167.00

#	Downhill	Points
1	(United States) Lindsey Vonn	129.7
2	(Austria) A. Moser-Pröll	115.4
3	(Austria) Renate Götschl	78.6
4	(Germany) Katja Seizinger	76.0
5	(Italy) Sofia Goggia	69.8
6	(Switzerland) Michela Figini	68.0
7	(Switzerland) Maria Walliser	55.4
8	(Austria) Michaela Dorfmeister	51.4
9	(Switzerland) M. Therese Nadig	48.9
10	(Switzerland) Corinne Suter	43.3

#	Super-G	Points
1	(Switzerland) Lara Gut-Behrami	92.8
2	(United States) Lindsey Vonn	77.5
3	(Germany) Katja Seizinger	60.3
4	(Austria) Michaela Dorfmeister	57.8
5	(Austria) Renate Götschl	47.2
6	(Italy) Federica Brignone	44.4
7	(France) Carole Merle	43.0
8	(Austria) Anna Veith	39.0
9	(Austria) Alexandra Meissnitzer	34.1
10	(Italy) Isolde Kostner	30.1

#	Giant slalom	Points
1	(Switzerland) Vreni Schneider	87.5
2	(Italy) Federica Brignone	76.6
3	(United States) Mikaela Shiffrin	72.5
4	(Italy) Deborah Compagnoni	70.0
5	(Germany) Viktoria Rebensburg	62.6
6	(Slovenia) Tina Maze	60.8
7	(Sweden) Anja Pärson	57.6
8	(France) Tessa Worley	54.1
9	(Austria) Anita Wachter	47.6
10	(Austria) A. Moser-Pröll	45.5

#	Slalom	Points
1	(United States) Mikaela Shiffrin	199.1
2	(Switzerland) Vreni Schneider	110.3
3	(Austria) Marlies Schild	90.5
4	(Croatia) Janica Kostelić	71.2
5	(Switzerland) Erika Hess	67.8
6	(Slovakia) Petra Vlhová	62.4
7	(Sweden) Anja Pärson	57.5
8	(Liechtenstein) Hanni Wenzel	51.0
9	(Germany) Maria Höfl-Riesch	49.1
10	(France) Marielle Goitschel	43.3

== Parallel events ==
=== Parallel slalom ===
Parallel slaloms from 1976 to 1991 counted for Nations Cup. There were no limitations regarding the number of athletes who could enter the competition, but each main event was limited to 32 competitors.

==== Men ====
Date	Place	Season	Winner	Second	Third
Nations Cup
20 March 1976	(Canada) Mont St. Anne	1975/76	(Italy) Franco Bieler	(Sweden) Ingemar Stenmark	(Canada) Jim Hunter
26 March 1977	(Spain) Sierra Nevada	1976/77	(Austria) Manfred Brunner	(Austria) Klaus Heidegger	(Italy) Bruno Nöckler
19 March 1978	(Switzerland) Arosa	1977/78	(United States) Phil Mahre	(Sweden) Ingemar Stenmark	(Austria) Leonhard Stock
14 December 1978	(Italy) Madonna di Campiglio	1978/79	(Sweden) Ingemar Stenmark	(Italy) Mauro Bernardi	(Italy) Karl Trojer
14 March 1980	(Austria) Saalbach	1979/80	(Austria) Anton Steiner	(Sweden) Ingemar Stenmark	(Norway) Jarle Halsnes
30 March 1981	(Switzerland) Laax	1980/81	(Sweden) Ingemar Stenmark	(Norway) Jarle Halsnes	(United States) Phil Mahre
28 March 1982	(France) Montgenèvre	1981/82	(United States) Phil Mahre	(Sweden) Ingemar Stenmark	(Austria) Hans Enn
21 March 1983	(Japan) Furano	1982/83	(Sweden) Ingemar Stenmark (3)	(United States) Phil Mahre	(Liechtenstein) Andreas Wenzel
25 March 1984	(Norway) Oslo	1983/84	(Austria) Hans Enn	(Austria) Anton Steiner	(Sweden) Ingemar Stenmark
6 January 1986	(Austria) Vienna	1985/86	(Italy) Ivano Edalini	(Germany) Markus Wasmeier	(Austria) Anton Steiner
22 March 1986	(Canada) Bromont	1985/86	(Liechtenstein) Paul Frommelt	(Italy) Marco Tonazzi	(Luxembourg) Marc Girardelli
28 December 1986	(West Germany) Berlin	1986/87	(Austria) Leonhard Stock	(Socialist Federal Republic of Yugoslavia) Bojan Križaj	(West Germany) Michael Eder
22 December 1987	(Italy) Bormio	1987/88	(Switzerland) Pirmin Zurbriggen	(Switzerland) Joël Gaspoz	(Switzerland) Martin Hangl
27 March 1988	(Austria) Saalbach	1987/88	(Italy) Alberto Tomba	(Switzerland) Pirmin Zurbriggen	(Austria) Helmut Mayer
11 March 1989	(Japan) Shiga Kōgen	1988/89	(Austria) Bernhard Gstrein	(Switzerland) Pirmin Zurbriggen	(Austria) Rudolf Nierlich
24 March 1991	(United States) Waterville	1990/91	(Switzerland) Urs Kälin	(Switzerland) Paul Accola	(Norway) Ole Kristian Furuseth
Promotional event
2 January 2009	(Russia) Moscow	2008/09	(Germany) Felix Neureuther	(France) Jean-Baptiste Grange	(United States) Bode Miller
21 November 2009	(Russia) Moscow	2009/10	(Austria) Marcel Hirscher	(France) Steve Missillier	(Canada) Michael Janyk
World Cup
23 March 1975	(Italy) Val Gardena	1974/75	(Italy) Gustav Thöni	(Sweden) Ingemar Stenmark	(Switzerland) Walter Tresch
24 October 1997	(France) Tignes	1997/98	(Austria) Josef Strobl	(Norway) Kjetil André Aamodt	(Austria) Hermann Maier

==== Women ====
Date	Place	Season	Winner	Second	Third
Nations Cup
20 March 1976	(Canada) Mont St. Anne	1975/76	(Switzerland) Bernadette Zurbriggen	(West Germany) Irene Epple	(Austria) Monika Kaserer
26 March 1977	(Spain) Sierra Nevada	1976/77	(West Germany) Christa Zechmeister	(Switzerland) Marie-Theres Nadig	(Austria) Annemarie Moser-Pröll
19 March 1978	(Switzerland) Arosa	1977/78	(Austria) Annemarie Moser-Pröll	(West Germany) Christa Zechmeister	(United States) Viki Fleckenstein
16 March 1980	(Austria) Saalbach	1979/80	(Austria) Annemarie Moser-Pröll (2)	(Italy) Claudia Giordani	(West Germany) Maria Epple
30 March 1981	(Switzerland) Laax	1980/81	(United States) Tamara McKinney	(West Germany) Traudl Hächer	(Liechtenstein) Hanni Wenzel
28 March 1982	(France) Montgenèvre	1981/82	(West Germany) Maria Epple	(Austria) Lea Sölkner	(France) Perrine Pelen
21 March 1983	(Japan) Furano	1982/83	(France) Anne-Flore Rey	(Liechtenstein) Hanni Wenzel	(Austria) Anni Kronbichler
25 March 1984	(Norway) Oslo	1983/84	(Czechoslovakia) Olga Charvátová	(Switzerland) Erika Hess	(United States) Tamara McKinney
22 March 1986	(Canada) Bromont	1985/86	(Switzerland) Vreni Schneider	(Switzerland) Maria Walliser	(Switzerland) Corinne Schmidhauser
18 January 1987	(Germany) Munich	1986/87	(United States) Tamara McKinney	(France) Małgorzata Tlałka-Mogore	(Switzerland) Corinne Schmidhauser
22 December 1987	(Italy) Bormio	1987/88	(Switzerland) Brigitte Oertli	(Switzerland) Corinne Schmidhauser	(Switzerland) Michela Figini
27 March 1988	(Austria) Saalbach	1987/88	(West Germany) Christina Meier	(Austria) Ulrike Maier	(Austria) Roswitha Steiner
11 March 1989	(Japan) Shiga Kōgen	1988/89	(Switzerland) Chantal Bournissen	(West Germany) Michaela Gerg-Leitner	(United States) Tamara McKinney
24 March 1991	(United States) Waterville	1990/91	(Austria) Anita Wachter	(Austria) Ingrid Salvenmoser	(Switzerland) Chantal Bournissen
Promotional event
21 November 2009	(Russia) Moscow	2009/10	(Sweden) Therese Borssén	(Germany) Maria Riesch	(Sweden) Frida Hansdotter
World Cup
24 March 1975	(Italy) Val Gardena	1974/75	(Austria) Monika Kaserer	(Italy) Claudia Giordani	(France) Fabienne Serrat
24 October 1997	(France) Tignes	1997/98	(France) Leila Piccard	(Sweden) Ylva Nowén	(Austria) Alexandra Meissnitzer
28 November 1997	(United States) Mammoth Mountain	1997/98	(Germany) Hilde Gerg	(Germany) Martina Ertl	(Austria) Alexandra Meissnitzer
20 December 2017	(France) Courchevel	2017/18	(United States) Mikaela Shiffrin	(Slovakia) Petra Vlhová	(Italy) Irene Curtoni
9 December 2018	(Switzerland) St. Moritz	2018/19	(United States) Mikaela Shiffrin (2)	(Slovakia) Petra Vlhová	(Switzerland) Wendy Holdener
15 December 2019	(Switzerland) St. Moritz	2019/20	(Slovakia) Petra Vlhová	(Sweden) Anna Swenn-Larsson	(Austria) Franziska Gritsch

not counted as an official World cup win

=== City event ===
Parallel city event is a version of parallel slalom where only Top16 ranked are allowed to compete. Length of the track and course/gates setting are also different from classic parallel slalom, and as of 2019/20 season, they are completely replaced with normal parallel races with qualification run.

==== Men ====
Date	Place	Season	Winner	Second	Third
2 January 2011	(Germany) Munich	2010/11	(Croatia) Ivica Kostelić	(France) Julien Lizeroux	(United States) Bode Miller
21 February 2012	(Russia) Moscow	2011/12	(France) Alexis Pinturault	(Germany) Felix Neureuther	(Sweden) André Myhrer
1 January 2013	(Germany) Munich	2012/13	(Germany) Felix Neureuther	(Austria) Marcel Hirscher	(France) Alexis Pinturault
29 January 2013	(Russia) Moscow	2012/13	(Austria) Marcel Hirscher	(Sweden) André Myhrer	(Croatia) Ivica Kostelić
23 February 2016	(Sweden) Stockholm	2015/16	(Austria) Marcel Hirscher (2)	(Sweden) André Myhrer	(Italy) Stefano Gross
31 January 2017	(Sweden) Stockholm	2016/17	(Germany) Linus Straßer	(France) Alexis Pinturault	(Sweden) Mattias Hargin
1 January 2018	(Norway) Oslo	2017/18	(Sweden) André Myhrer	(Austria) Michael Matt	(Germany) Linus Straßer
30 January 2018	(Sweden) Stockholm	2017/18	(Switzerland) Ramon Zenhäusern	(Sweden) André Myhrer	(Germany) Linus Straßer
1 January 2019	(Norway) Oslo	2018/19	(Austria) Marco Schwarz	(United Kingdom) Dave Ryding	(Switzerland) Ramon Zenhäusern
19 February 2019	(Sweden) Stockholm	2018/19	(Switzerland) Ramon Zenhäusern (2)	(Sweden) André Myhrer	(Austria) Marco Schwarz

==== Women ====
Date	Place	Season	Winner	Second	Third
2 January 2011	(Germany) Munich	2010/11	(Sweden) Maria Pietilä-Holmner	(Slovenia) Tina Maze	(Austria) Elisabeth Görgl
21 February 2012	(Russia) Moscow	2011/12	(United States) Julia Mancuso	(Austria) Michaela Kirchgasser	(United States) Lindsey Vonn
1 January 2013	(Germany) Munich	2012/13	(Slovakia) Veronika Velez-Zuzulová	(Slovenia) Tina Maze	(Austria) Michaela Kirchgasser
29 January 2013	(Russia) Moscow	2012/13	(Germany) Lena Dürr	(Slovakia) Veronika Velez-Zuzulová	(United States) Mikaela Shiffrin
23 February 2016	(Sweden) Stockholm	2015/16	(Switzerland) Wendy Holdener	(Sweden) Frida Hansdotter	(Sweden) Maria Pietilä-Holmner
31 January 2017	(Sweden) Stockholm	2016/17	(United States) Mikaela Shiffrin	(Slovakia) Veronika Velez-Zuzulová	(Norway) Nina Løseth
1 January 2018	(Norway) Oslo	2017/18	(United States) Mikaela Shiffrin (2)	(Switzerland) Wendy Holdener	(Switzerland) Mélanie Meillard
30 January 2018	(Sweden) Stockholm	2017/18	(Norway) Nina Haver-Løseth	(Switzerland) Wendy Holdener	(Slovakia) Petra Vlhová
1 January 2019	(Norway) Oslo	2018/19	(Slovakia) Petra Vlhová	(United States) Mikaela Shiffrin	(Switzerland) Wendy Holdener
19 February 2019	(Sweden) Stockholm	2018/19	(United States) Mikaela Shiffrin (3)	(Germany) Christina Geiger	(Sweden) Anna Swenn-Larsson

=== Knockout slalom ===
There were a total of two races (one in the men's category and one in the women's category) and it was in 2002/03 season. The points were added together with slalom races.

==== Men ====
Date	Place	Season	Winner	Second	Third
16 December 2002	(Italy) Sestriere	2002/03	(Croatia) Ivica Kostelić	(Italy) Giorgio Rocca	(Norway) Truls Ove Karlsen

==== Women ====
Date	Place	Season	Winner	Second	Third
15 December 2002	(Italy) Sestriere	2002/03	(Sweden) Anja Pärson	(Finland) Tanja Poutiainen	(Austria) Nicole Hosp

=== Parallel giant slalom ===
Introduced by the International Ski Federation to the World Cup as a spectator-friendly event in late 2015, the parallel giant slalom competition, or shortened parallel-G, joining the parallel slalom, is intended to lure more speed specialists into the faster of the two technical disciplines, along with attracting their fans to watch the races at the venue, on-line, and on television. Few venues offer the slope and conditions required to host an extremely short Giant slalom course that can be readily viewed in its entirety by a compact gallery of fans. Modified or not, the Federation has not suggested that they will push the format to lower-level tours like the NorAm and Europa Cup.

==== Format ====
The Chief Race Director of the inaugural event at Alta Badia, Markus Waldner, on 20 December 2015 stated that "great performances" and "head-to-head fights" between the best giant slalom racers is the goal of the competition. The course for the first race was very compact at about 20–22 seconds duration, or about one-third of a normal GS run. The pace and cadence was the same as Giant slalom, not standard Slalom. Gates were set at roughly the same distances as GS and on a slope of about the same pitch. The field of thirty-two were drawn following an invitational format. The top four men in the overall World Cup rankings were automatic invitees, if they chose to compete. Another 16 racers were selected from the top of the current GS start list rankings, and the final twelve competitors were selected from the 1st run efforts at the standard GS event the day prior at the same venue. Overlapping qualifications allowed the sponsors to invite lower ranked participants to fill in gaps, as needed, and to replace individuals who declined to participate. Points were awarded and accumulated according to current standards for the race season in all relevant categories: the GS discipline, Overall and Nations Cup. The field was filled with thirty-two first round participants, each getting a run on either course. The best combined times moved the fastest racer to the second round through bracket preference protocols. From the second round, skiers the head-to-head competitions were held over one run only, with the faster skier from the previous round granted course selection between the 'red-right' or 'blue-left' course. At about one-third the time of a standard GS event, top performers/finalists were able to make multiple runs without the fatigue of a longer event. The course was methodically set with lasers, and a GPS-equipped Snowcat, to guarantee that both courses on the hill were as identical as possible to ensure equity and a fair competition. The Race Director suggested the difference between the two lanes were within "1–to–2 centimeters" tolerance of one another.

==== Events ====
Men's World Cup parallel giant slalom events
Venue	Date	Winner	Second	Third	Fourth	Notes
(Italy) Alta Badia	21 December 2015	(Norway) Kjetil Jansrud	(Norway) Aksel Lund Svindal	(Sweden) Andre Myhrer	(Germany) Dominik Schwaiger	
(Italy) Alta Badia	19 December 2016	(France) Cyprien Sarrazin	(Switzerland) Carlo Janka	(Norway) Kjetil Jansrud	(Norway) Leif Kristian Haugen	
(Italy) Alta Badia	18 December 2017	(Sweden) Matts Olsson	(Norway) Henrik Kristoffersen	(Austria) Marcel Hirscher	(Norway) Aleksander Aamodt Kilde	
(Italy) Alta Badia	17 December 2018	(Austria) Marcel Hirscher	(France) Thibaut Favrot	(France) Alexis Pinturault	(Sweden) Matts Olsson	
(Italy) Alta Badia	23 December 2019	(Norway) Rasmus Windingstad	(Germany) Stefan Luitz	(Austria) Roland Leitinger	(Norway) Leif Kristian Nestvold-Haugen	
(France) Chamonix	9 February 2020	(Switzerland) Loïc Meillard	(Switzerland) Thomas Tumler	(Germany) Alexander Schmid	(United States) Tommy Ford	
(Austria) Lech/Zürs	27 November 2020	(France) Alexis Pinturault	(Norway) Henrik Kristoffersen	(Germany) Alexander Schmid	(Austria) Adrian Pertl	
(Austria) Lech/Zürs	14 November 2021	(Austria) Christian Hirschbühl	(Austria) Dominik Raschner	(Norway) Atle Lie McGrath	(Norway) Henrik Kristoffersen	

Women's World Cup parallel giant slalom events
Venue	Date	Winner	Second	Third	Fourth	Notes
(Italy) Sestriere	19 January 2020	(France) Clara Direz	(Austria) Elisa Mörzinger	(Italy) Marta Bassino	(Italy) Federica Brignone	
(Austria) Lech/Zürs	26 November 2020	(Slovakia) Petra Vlhová	(United States) Paula Moltzan	(Switzerland) Lara Gut-Behrami	(Sweden) Sara Hector	
(Austria) Lech/Zürs	13 November 2021	(Slovenia) Andreja Slokar	(Norway) Thea Louise Stjernesund	(Norway) Kristin Lysdahl	(Italy) Marta Bassino	

== Various records ==
=== Men ===
Category	Season(s)		Record
Prize money in CHF (single season)	2023	(Switzerland) Marco Odermatt	941,200
Overall points	2023	(Switzerland) Marco Odermatt	2042
Margin of victory	2024	(Switzerland) Marco Odermatt	874
Avg. points per race (all participated races - career)	2008-2018	(Austria) Marcel Hirscher	55,69
Avg. points per race (all races in a season)	2024	(Switzerland) Marco Odermatt	55,63
Avg. points per race (all participed races)	2018	(Austria) Marcel Hirscher	81
Overall titles	2012–2019	(Austria) Marcel Hirscher	8
Consecutive overall titles	2012–2019	(Austria) Marcel Hirscher	8
Discipline titles	1975–1984	(Sweden) Ingemar Stenmark	15
Discipline titles (single season)	1987	(Switzerland) Pirmin Zurbriggen	4
Total wins	1975–1989	(Sweden) Ingemar Stenmark	86
Wins (single season)	1979; 2001; 2018; 2023; 2024	(Sweden) Ingemar Stenmark (Austria) Hermann Maier (Austria) Marcel Hirscher (Switzerland) Marco Odermatt (Switzerland) Marco Odermatt	13
Most wins at one venue (all disciplines)	2012–2019	(Austria) Marcel Hirscher	9
Most wins at one venue (single discipline)	2016–2026	(Italy) Dominik Paris	8
Most wins (within one calendar year)	2018	(Austria) Marcel Hirscher	14
Consecutive wins (all disciplines)	1977–1978	(Sweden) Ingemar Stenmark	10
Consecutive wins (single discipline)	1978–1980	(Sweden) Ingemar Stenmark	14
Total podiums	1974–1989	(Sweden) Ingemar Stenmark	155
Podiums (single season)	2000; 2023	(Austria) Hermann Maier (Switzerland) Marco Odermatt	22
Consecutive podiums (all disciplines)	1979–1981	(Sweden) Ingemar Stenmark	41
Consecutive podiums (single discipline)	1977–1982	(Sweden) Ingemar Stenmark	37
Top ten results	1990–2006	(Norway) Kjetil André Aamodt	233
Top tens (single season)	1999	(Norway) Kjetil André Aamodt	28
World Cup starts	1996–2015	(Austria) Benjamin Raich	441
Participated races (complete season)	2000	(Norway) Kjetil André Aamodt	37
Winner with the highest start No.	1994	(Liechtenstein) Markus Foser	66
Youngest race winner	1973	(Italy) Piero Gros	18.1
Oldest race winner	2012	(Switzerland) Didier Cuche	37.5
Top speed	2013	(France) Johan Clarey	161.9 km/h (101 mph)

=== Women ===
Category	Season(s)		Record
Prize money in CHF (single season)	2023	(United States) Mikaela Shiffrin	964,200
Overall points	2013	(Slovenia) Tina Maze	2414
Margin of victory	2013	(Slovenia) Tina Maze	1313
Avg. points per race (all participated races - career)	2012-2019	(United States) Mikaela Shiffrin	59.14
Avg. points per race (all races in a season)	2013	(Slovenia) Tina Maze	69
Avg. points per race (all participed races in a season)	2019	(United States) Mikaela Shiffrin	85
Overall titles	1969–1980; 2012–2026	(Austria) Annemarie Moser-Pröll (United States) Mikaela Shiffrin	6
Consecutive overall titles	1971–1975	(Austria) Annemarie Moser-Pröll	5
Discipline titles	2008–2016	(United States) Lindsey Vonn	16
Discipline titles (single season)	2010–2012; 2019	(United States) Lindsey Vonn (United States) Mikaela Shiffrin	3
Total wins	2012–2026	(United States) Mikaela Shiffrin	110
Wins (single season)	2019	(United States) Mikaela Shiffrin	17
Most wins at one venue (all disciplines)	2005–2015	(United States) Lindsey Vonn	18
Most wins at one venue (single discipline)	2005–2016	(United States) Lindsey Vonn	14
Most wins (within one calendar year)	2018	(United States) Mikaela Shiffrin	15
Most wins (in one discipline in one season, slalom)	2025–2026	(United States) Mikaela Shiffrin	9
Consecutive wins (all disciplines)	1989	(Switzerland) Vreni Schneider	10
Consecutive wins (single discipline)	1972–1974	(Austria) Annemarie Moser-Pröll	11
Total podiums	2012–2026	(United States) Mikaela Shiffrin	168
Podiums (single season)	2013	(Slovenia) Tina Maze	24
Consecutive podiums (all disciplines)	1979–1980	(Switzerland) Marie-Therese Nadig	14
Consecutive podiums (single discipline)	1971–1974	(Austria) Annemarie Moser-Pröll	23
Top ten results	2012–2026	(United States) Mikaela Shiffrin	245
Top tens (single season)	2013	(Slovenia) Tina Maze	32
World Cup starts	2000–2025	(United States) Lindsey Vonn	416
Participated races (complete season)	2013	(Slovenia) Tina Maze	35
Winner with the highest start No.	1994	(Slovenia) Katja Koren	66
Youngest race winner	1974	(Germany) Christa Zechmeister	16.0
Oldest race winner	2025	(United States) Lindsey Vonn	41.2
Top speed	2022	(Austria) Ramona Siebenhofer	143.2 km/h (89 mph)

== Scoring system ==
The World Cup scoring system is based on awarding a number of points for each place in a race, but the procedure for doing so and the often-arcane method used to calculate the annual champions has varied greatly over the years. Originally, points were awarded only to the top ten finishers in each race, with 25 points for the winner, 20 for second, 15 for third, 11 for fourth, 8 for fifth, 6 for sixth, 4 for seventh, then decreasing by one point for each lower place. To determine the winner for each discipline World Cup, only a racer's best three results counted, from a typical six to eight races in each discipline (consistent with the then-current classification of skiers as amateurs, who couldn't be expected compete all the time). For the overall Cup, only these best three results in each discipline were included. Until 1970, the results of Winter Olympic Games races and Alpine World Ski Championship races were also included in the World Cup points valuation (i.e., Grenoble 1968 and Val Gardena 1970); this was abandoned after 1970, mainly due to the limited number of racers per nation who are permitted to take part in these events. Beginning with the 1971–72 season (the sixth season), the number of results counted was increased to five in each discipline. The formula used to determine the overall winner varied almost every year over the next decade, with some seasons divided into two portions with a fixed number of results in each period counting toward the overall, while in other seasons the best three or four results in each discipline would count.

Starting with the 1979–80 season (the 14th season), points were awarded to the top 15 finishers in each race. After 1980–81, the formula for the overall title stabilized for several years, counting the best 5 results in the original disciplines (slalom, giant slalom, and downhill) plus the best three results in combined. When Super G events were introduced for the 1982–83 season, the results were included with giant slalom for the first three seasons, before a separate Cup for the discipline was awarded starting in 1985–86 and the top 3 Super G results were counted toward the overall. The formula for the overall was changed yet again the following season, with the top four results in each discipline counting, along with all combined results (although the combined was nearly eliminated from the schedule, reduced to one or two events per season).

This perennial tweaking of the scoring formula was a source of ongoing uncertainty to the World Cup racers and to fans. The need for a complete overhaul of the scoring system had grown increasingly urgent with each successive year, especially once the FIS and the International Olympic Committee accepted after 1984 that the skiers were fully professional and not amateurs, so they no longer needed an artificial limitation on their number of events.

In 1987–88 (the 22nd season), the FIS decided to simplify the system: all results would now count in each discipline and in the overall. This new system was an immediate success, and the practice of counting all results has been maintained in every subsequent season.

With the ongoing expansion of the number and quality of competitors in World Cup races over the years, another major change to the scoring system was implemented in the 1991–92 season (the 26th season). Instead of only the top 15 skiers scoring points, with 25 points awarded for winning, 20 for second, and 15 for third (as had been done every season after the end of 1978-79), the top 30 finishers in each race would now earn points, with 100 for the winner, 80 for second, 60 for third, and then decreasing by smaller increments for each lower place. The point values were adjusted slightly the following season (to adjust and reduce the points for places 4th through 20th), and the scoring system has not been changed again since that year.

The table below compares the point values under all five scoring systems which have been in use:

Place	1	2	3	4	5	6	7	8	9	10	11	12	13	14	15	16	17	18	19	20	21	22	23	24	25	26	27	28	29	30
Current system 1993–	100	80	60	50	45	40	36	32	29	26	24	22	20	18	16	15	14	13	12	11	10	9	8	7	6	5	4	3	2	1
1992 system 1992	100	80	60	55	51	47	43	40	37	34	31	28	26	24	22	20	18	16	14	12	10	9	8	7	6	5	4	3	2	1
Top 15 system 1980–1991	25	20	15	12	11	10	9	8	7	6	5	4	3	2	1
1979 system † 1979	25	24	23	22	21	20	19	18	17	16	15	14	13	12	11	10	9	8	7	6	5	4	3	2	1
Original system 1967–1979	25	20	15	11	8	6	4	3	2	1

Place	1	2	3	4	T5 (4)	T9 (8)
Parallel slalom	100	80	60	50	40	15

† The scoring system changed during the 1978–79 season; this special system was used for the last two men's downhills and the last three races in every other discipline except combined.

=== Statistical analysis ===
Since the Top 30 scoring system was implemented in 1991–92., the number of completed men's or women's World Cup races each year has ranged from 30 to 44, so the maximum possible point total for an individual racer is about 3000–4400 under the current scoring system. Very few racers actually ski in all events. Bode Miller is the only skier who competed in every World Cup race during the three seasons from 2003 to 2005. The current record for total World Cup points in a season is Tina Maze's 2414 points in 2012–13, with the men's record of 2042 points set by Marco Odermatt in 2022–2023. The fewest points for an overall champion under the current system thus far have been 1009 for men by Aksel Lund Svindal in 2008–09 and 1248 for women by Vreni Schneider in 1994–95. The largest margin of victory in the overall has been Maze's 1313 points in 2012–13, more than doubling second-place finisher Maria Höfl-Riesch's total, while the largest men's margin was 743 points by Hermann Maier in 2000–01. Note that in the early days of World Cup (when the first place was awarded only 25 points), even larger relative margins of victory were recorded in 1967 by Jean-Claude Killy with 225 points over Heinrich Messner with 114 points and in 1973–74 by Annemarie Moser-Pröll with 268 points over Monika Kaserer with 153 points. The closest finishes since 1992 have been minuscule margins of 6 points in 1994–95 (Vreni Schneider over Katja Seizinger), 3 points in 2004–05 (Anja Pärson over Janica Kostelić) and in 2010–11 (Maria Riesch over Lindsey Vonn), and only 2 points in 2008–09 (Aksel Lund Svindal over Benjamin Raich). The current men's record for total World Cup points in one month of the season is Ivica Kostelić's 999 points from January 2011.

The tables below contain a brief statistical analysis of the overall World Cup standings during the 21 seasons since the Top 30 scoring system was implemented in 1991–92. In general, over 1000 points are needed to contend for the overall title. At least 1 man and 1 woman has scored 1000 points in each of these seasons, but no more than 5 men's or women's racers have crossed that threshold in any single season. Of the 42 men's and women's overall champions in these years, 38 scored over 1200 points, 30 had over 1300 points, 19 reached 1500 points, and only 7 amassed more than 1700 points during their winning seasons. As for the runners-up, 37 of the 42 second-place finishers scored over 1000 points, 18 had over 1300 points, and only 4 reached 1500 points yet failed to win. Most overall titles have been won quite convincingly, by more than 200 points in 23 of 42 cases, while only 11 margins of victory have been tighter than 50 points.

Annual Statistics Calculated for the 1992–2012 Seasons
	Men's overall World Cup
	Races Completed	1st Place Points	Margin of Victory	2nd Place Points	3rd Place Points	Number of Skiers per Season:
	Races Completed	1st Place Points	Margin of Victory	2nd Place Points	3rd Place Points	> 1000 Pts	> 500 Pts	> 200 Pts
Maximum	44	2000	743	1454	1307	5	21	50
Average	35.4	1414	258	1155	1001	2.5	14	41
Minimum	30	1009	2	775	760	1	8	37
	Women's overall World Cup
	Races Completed	1st Place Points	Margin of Victory	2nd Place Points	3rd Place Points	Number of Skiers per Season:
	Races Completed	1st Place Points	Margin of Victory	2nd Place Points	3rd Place Points	> 1000 Pts	> 500 Pts	> 200 Pts
Maximum	39	1980	578	1725	1391	5	19	45
Average	33.4	1570	244	1326	1117	3.3	13	37
Minimum	30	1248	3	931	904	1	9	32

Aggregate Statistics Calculated for the 1992–2012 Seasons
	Men's and Women's overall World Cups: Total Numbers Across 21 Seasons
	> 1700 Pts	> 1500 Pts	> 1300 Pts	> 1200 Pts	> 1100 Pts	> 1000 Pts	> 900 Pts	> 800 Pts
First place	7	19	30	38	41	42	42	42
Second place	1	4	18	24	28	37	40	41
Third place	–	–	4	7	15	27	36	40
	> 600 Pts	> 500 Pts	> 400 Pts	> 300 Pts	> 200 Pts	> 100 Pts	>= 50 Pts	< 50 Pts
Margin of Victory	2	6	10	19	23	28	31	11

== Finals ==
Since 1993 the International Ski Federation (FIS) has hosted a World Cup Final at the end of each season in March. During five days, men's and women's races are held in four disciplines: slalom, giant slalom, Super G, and downhill, as well as a team event. Only a limited number of racers are invited to ski at the Finals, including the top 25 in the World Cup standings in each discipline, the current junior World Champions in each discipline, and any skiers with at least 500 points in the general classification. Because of the smaller field, World Cup points are only awarded to the top 15 finishers in each race.

From their inception, the finals took place during one week, with the speed events held during the week and the technical events during the weekend. However, in 2024, the schedule was changed so that the finals took up two weekends, with the technical events held during the first weekend and the speed events held during the second. However, that backfired when a snowstorm hit on the last day of the fortnight, cancelling both downhills. Then, beginning in 2025, the finals were changed again to take up a week and a half, with the downhill training runs held during the first week, the speed event finals held that weekend, and the technical events held on weekdays during the second week.

=== Hosts ===
- 1993 Åre, Sweden
- 1994 Vail, U.S.
- 1995 Bormio, Italy
- 1996 Lillehammer, Norway
- 1997 Vail, U.S. (2)
- 1998 Crans-Montana, Switzerland
- 1999 Sierra Nevada, Spain
- 2000 Bormio, Italy (2)
- 2001 Åre, Sweden (2)
- 2002 Altenmarkt-Zauchensee, Austria
- 2003 Lillehammer, Norway (2)
- 2004 Sestriere, Italy
- 2005 Lenzerheide, Switzerland
- 2006 Åre, Sweden (3)
- 2007 Lenzerheide, Switzerland (2)
- 2008 Bormio, Italy (3)
- 2009 Åre, Sweden (4)
- 2010 Garmisch-Partenkirchen, Germany
- 2011 Lenzerheide, Switzerland (3)
- 2012 Schladming, Austria
- 2013 Lenzerheide, Switzerland (4)
- 2014 Lenzerheide, Switzerland (5)
- 2015 Méribel, France
- 2016 St. Moritz, Switzerland
- 2017 Aspen, U.S.
- 2018 Åre, Sweden (5)
- 2019 Soldeu, Andorra
- 2020 CANCELLED
- 2021 Lenzerheide, Switzerland (6)
- 2022 Méribel/Courchevel, France (2)
- 2023 Soldeu, Andorra (2)
- 2024 Saalbach-Hinterglemm, Austria
- 2025 Sun Valley, U.S.
- 2026 Hafjell/Kvitfjell, Norway (Lillehammer, 3)
- 2027 Sun Valley, U.S. (2)
- 2028 Narvik, Norway

== Winners by country ==
The table below lists those nations which have won at least one World Cup race (current as of 15 November 2026).

=== Men ===
Rank	Nation	Total	Wins by disciplines								
Rank	Nation	Total	DH	SG	GS	SL	KB	PSL	PGS	CE	K.O.
1	Austria	560	193	89	114	134	24	1	2	3	–
2	Switzerland	363	142	54	107	26	31	–	1	2	–
3	Norway	213	53	50	33	61	14	–	2	–	–
4	Italy	199	49	21	49	74	5	1	–	–	–
5	France	175	33	7	44	75	13	–	2	1	–
6	United States	130	31	10	45	25	19	–	–	–	–
7	Sweden	120	–	3	53	62	–	–	1	1	–
8	Germany	56	11	8	3	30	2	–	–	2	–
9	Luxembourg	46	3	9	7	16	11	–	–	–	–
10	Canada	39	31	6	2	–	–	–	–	–	–
11	Croatia	29	–	1	3	14	9	–	–	1	1
12	Slovenia	27	4	–	3	20	–	–	–	–	–
13	Liechtenstein	24	3	3	4	8	6	–	–	–	–
14	Finland	14	–	–	4	10	–	–	–	–	–
15	Soviet Union	5	1	–	3	1	–	–	–	–	–
16	Brazil	5	–	–	3	2	–	–	–	–	–
17	Australia	2	1	1	–	–	–	–	–	–	–
	Bulgaria	2	–	–	–	2	–	–	–	–	–
19	Spain	1	–	–	–	1	–	–	–	–	–
	Russia	1	–	–	–	1	–	–	–	–	–
	Poland	1	–	–	–	1	–	–	–	–	–
	Great Britain	1	–	–	–	1	–	–	–	–	–
	Czech Republic	1	–	1	–	–	–	–	–	–	–
Total		2014	554	264	477	564	134	2	8	10	1

=== Women ===
Rank	Nation	Total	Wins by disciplines								
Rank	Nation	Total	DH	SG	GS	SL	KB	PSL	PGS	CE	K.O.
1	Austria	401	127	64	98	89	22	1	–	–	–
2	Switzerland	343	100	48	84	82	28	–	–	1	–
3	United States	277	73	38	44	106	10	2	–	4	–
4	Germany	196	51	47	52	32	12	1	–	1	–
5	France	163	24	24	53	60	–	1	1	–	–
6	Italy	149	45	36	50	12	6	–	–	–	–
7	Sweden	93	8	8	23	46	6	–	–	1	1
8	Slovenia	62	11	7	21	18	4	–	1	–	–
9	Liechtenstein	45	3	7	14	13	8	–	–	–	–
10	Canada	42	15	5	13	6	3	–	–	–	–
11	Slovakia	36	–	–	6	26	–	1	1	2	–
12	Croatia	33	1	1	2	23	6	–	–	–	–
13	Norway	15	2	4	5	3	–	–	–	1	–
14	Finland	11	–	–	5	6	–	–	–	–	–
	Spain	11	1	–	7	3	–	–	–	–	–
	New Zealand	12	–	1	6	5	–	–	–	–	–
17	Czech Republic	6	2	2	–	2	–	–	–	–	–
18	Russia	5	4	1	–	–	–	–	–	–	–
19	Czechoslovakia	3	1	–	–	1	1	–	–	–	–
20	Australia	1	–	–	–	1	–	–	–	–	–
	Poland	1	–	–	–	1	–	–	–	–	–
	Albania	1	–	–	–	1	–	–	–	–	–
Total		1906	468	293	483	536	106	6	3	10	1

=== Alpine team event ===
Rank	Nation	Total	By disciplines	
Rank	Nation	Total	PSL	PGS
1	Switzerland	5	–	5
2	Austria	3	2	1
	Sweden	3	–	3
4	Germany	2	–	2
	Norway	2	–	2
6	Italy	1	1	–
	Czech Republic	1	–	1
Total		17	3	14

Individual race wins are counted in this table, along with the nations team events held at World Cup Finals since 2006 (counts double as men and women in mixed competition contribute to a win). The "parallel race" is a head-to-head slalom race format used occasionally from the 1970s through 1990s, and again in 2011. Team event wins are doubled (because on one team event race competed both women and men; so it's counted separately each for women and men). Results for West Germany and Germany are counted together in this table. All of Yugoslavia's wins are currently lumped in with Slovenia, since the skiers who won races for former Yugoslavia were all Slovenes from Slovenia (one of six Yugoslav Republics), and thus are listed under Slovenia in online databases. The Soviet Union and Russia are counted separately, as are Czechoslovakia and the Czech Republic.

A total of 25 countries have won World Cup races, with 21 countries winning men's races and a different 21 winning women's races. As expected, the top ten nations in this list are the ten nations listed in the Nations Cup summary table (with slight changes in order).

Marc Girardelli accounted for all of Luxembourg's 46 wins, making Luxembourg the country that has won the most races among men without winning any among women. Slovakia, with 36 wins (31 from Petra Vlhová), has the most wins among women without any wins among men. Janica Kostelić has 30 of Croatia's 62 wins and her brother Ivica had 26. Ingemar Stenmark still has about 40% of Sweden's 212 wins more than three decades after his retirement. Liechtenstein has 69 wins in total, mostly coming from one family: Hanni Wenzel had 33, her brother Andreas had 14, and her daughter Tina Weirather had 9 (for a total of 56).

Some nations specialize in either speed (downhill and Super G) or technical (slalom and GS) disciplines, while others are strong across the board. Among nations with 30+ wins, the Canadian team has won 71% of its races in speed events, while Slovakia has won 100%, Croatia 93%, and Sweden 91% of their races in technical events, especially notable in Sweden's case given its large number of wins. Several nations with under 30 wins have almost 100% of them in technical events, led by Finland and Spain. In contrast Germany and Norway have the most even distribution without disproportionate strength or weakness in any one discipline. Some nations have strong teams in only one gender, as 93% of Norway's wins have come from their men, and 77% of Germany's and 67% of the United States's wins have come from their women, while the Swiss, French and Canadian totals are split almost equally.

== Nations Cup ==
The Nations Cup standings are calculated by adding up all points each season for all racers from a given nation.

The total number of top-three placings for each nation in the Nations Cup (through the 2024–25 season) are summarized below:

Nation	Total standings			Men's standings			Women's standings		
Nation	First	Second	Third	First	Second	Third	First	Second	Third
Austria	42	16	1	42	13	2	35	15	7
Switzerland	12	26	12	11	26	12	12	14	10
France	5	2	2	3	7	5	6	3	4
Italy	–	10	21	3	6	20	3	3	11
United States	–	3	10	–	2	3	–	10	9
Germany	–	1	9	–	–	1	4	12	13
Norway	–	1	2	–	5	12	–	–	–
Canada	–	–	1	–	–	–	–	–	1
Liechtenstein	–	–	1	–	–	–	–	–	1
Sweden	–	–	–	–	–	4	–	1	2

Note: Results for West Germany and Germany are counted together in this table.

== See also ==
Other world competitions

- Alpine skiing at the Winter Olympics
- FIS Alpine World Ski Championships
- List of FIS Alpine World Ski Championships medalists

Statistics

- List of FIS Alpine Ski World Cup men's champions
- List of FIS Alpine Ski World Cup women's champions
- List of FIS Alpine Ski World Cup men's race winners
- List of FIS Alpine Ski World Cup women's race winners
- List of FIS Alpine Ski World Cup winners of men's discipline titles
- List of FIS Alpine Ski World Cup winners of women's discipline titles
- List of FIS Alpine Ski World Cup host
  - List of FIS Alpine Ski World Cup men's hosts
  - List of FIS Alpine Ski World Cup women's hosts
- List of men's downhill races in the FIS Alpine Ski World Cup
- List of FIS Alpine Ski World Cup races calendar
- List of FIS Alpine Ski World Cup Nations Cup standings
