= List of FIS Alpine Ski World Cup hosts =

Statistics on the Alpine Ski World Cup

This is a list of all FIS Alpine Ski World Cup hosts from 1967 to present.

== Locations that have hosted World Cup competitions ==
Country	Place	Seasons																																																													Country
Country	Place	'67	'68	'69	'70	'71	'72	'73	'74	'75	'76	'77	'78	'79	'80	'81	'82	'83	'84	'85	'86	'87	'88	'89	'90	'91	'92	'93	'94	'95	'96	'97	'98	'99	'00	'01	'02	'03	'04	'05	'06	'07	'08	'09	'10	'11	'12	'13	'14	'15	'16	'17	'18	'19	'20	'21	'22	'23	'24	'25	'26	'27	Country
Andorra	Soldeu																																														•				•			•				•	•		•	•	(Andorra)
Argentina	Las Leñas																				•	•			•																																						(Argentina)
Australia	Thredbo																								•																																						(Australia)
Austria	Altenmarkt-Zauchensee															•							•			•			•				•		•		•			•		•		•		•			•		•	•			•		•		•		•		(Austria)
Austria	Bad Gastein		•		•		•		•		•		•		•		•		•		•		•																																								(Austria)
Austria	Bad Kleinkirchheim												•				•			•			•			•		•				•									•		•				•			×			•										(Austria)
Austria	Flachau																												•	•	•			•		•			•	•					•	•	•	•	•	•	•	•	•	•	•	•		•	•	•	•	•	(Austria)
Austria	Fulpmes									•																																																					(Austria)
Austria	Gosau																																																													•	(Austria)
Austria	Gurgl																																																										•	•	•	•	(Austria)
Austria	Haus im Ennstal															•			•						•			•		•						•			•						•																		(Austria)
Austria	Hinterstoder																					•			•		•		•		•				•							•				•					•				•								(Austria)
Austria	Innsbruck									•																								•	•			•											•														(Austria)
Austria	Kirchberg																•		•					•																																							(Austria)
Austria	Kitzbühel	•	•	•	•	•	•	•	•	•	•	•	•	•	•	•	•	•	•	•	•	•		•	•	•	•		•	•	•	•	•	•	•	•	•	•	•	•	•	•	•	•	•	•	•	•	•	•	•	•	•	•	•	•	•	•	•	•	•	•	(Austria)
Austria	Kühtai																																																	•													(Austria)
Austria	Lech/Zürs																						•				•	•	•	•																										•	•	×					(Austria)
Austria	Lienz				•																		•										•		•		•		•		•		•		•		•		•		•		•		•		•		•				(Austria)
Austria	Mellau													•								•		•																																							(Austria)
Austria	Reiteralm																																									•	•																				(Austria)
Austria	Saalbach							•	•	•					•		•					•	•			1st place, gold medalist(s)			•	•			•		•		•													•				•	•	•			•	1st place, gold medalist(s)		•	(Austria)
Austria	St. Anton			•				•				•		•		•		•			•			•				•	•		•			•	•	1st place, gold medalist(s)			•				•					•			×			×		•		•		•			(Austria)
Austria	Schladming								•		•			•		•	1st place, gold medalist(s)		•	•	•		•	•	•							•	•	•	•	•	•	•	•	•	•	•	•	•	•	•	•	1st place, gold medalist(s)	•	•	•	•	•	•	•	•	•	•	•	•	•	•	(Austria)
Austria	Schruns	•		•		•		•		•		•		•		•		•									•																																				(Austria)
Austria	Schwarzenberg																							•																																							(Austria)
Austria	Semmering																														•	•		•		•		•		•		•		•		•		•		×		•		•		•		•		•	•		(Austria)
Austria	Sölden																												•			•		•		•	•	•	•	•	•	×	•	•	•	•	•	•	•	•	•	•		•	•	•	•	•	•	•	•	•	(Austria)
Austria	Steinach													•																																																	(Austria)
Austria	Vienna																				•																																										(Austria)
Austria	Zell am See								•			•			•																																																(Austria)
Bosnia and Herzegovina	Sarajevo									•								•				•																																									(Bosnia and Herzegovina)
Bulgaria	Bansko																																											•		•				•				•	•	•			•				(Bulgaria)
Bulgaria	Borovets															•			•																																												(Bulgaria)
Canada	Banff						•													•	•																																										(Canada)
Canada	Bromont																				•																																										(Canada)
Canada	Garibaldi									•																																																					(Canada)
Canada	Lake Louise														•			•						•		•		•		•	•	•	•	•	•	•	•	•	•	•	•	•	•	•	•	•	•	•	•	•	•	•	•	•	•		•	•					(Canada)
Canada	Mont St. Anne			•		•		•			•				•				•						•																																						(Canada)
Canada	Mont Tremblant																	•																																									•	×	•	•	(Canada)
Canada	Nakiska																					•																																									(Canada)
Canada	Panorama																			•					•		•																•																				(Canada)
Canada	Rossland		•																				•																																								(Canada)
Canada	Stoneham																												•																																		(Canada)
Canada	Vancouver				•																																																										(Canada)
Canada	Whistler																•		•		•			•				•	•	•													•																				(Canada)
China	Yanqing																																																						×								(China)
Croatia	Zagreb																																							•	•	•	•	•	•	•	•	•	×	•	×	•	•	•	•	•	•	•					(Croatia)
Czech Republic	Špindlerův Mlýn																																								•		•			•								•				•			•		(Czech Republic)
Finland	Levi																																						•		•	•	×	•	•	•	×	•	•	•	×	•	•	•	•	•	•	•	•	•	•	•	(Finland)
France	Alpe d'Huez																•																																														(France)
France	Avoriaz								•																																																						(France)
France	Chamonix		•					•		•			•		•		•												•			•			•			×	•	•	•	×	•			•	•				•				•	•		•	•			•	(France)
France	Courchevel													•																																•	•	•	•	×	•	×	•	•	•	•	•	1st place, gold medalist(s)	•	•	•	•	(France)
France	La Mongie																			•																																											(France)
France	Les Arcs																																			•																											(France)
France	Les Contamines							•																																																							(France)
France	Les Gets								•		•			•		•																																															(France)
France	Les Houches												•																																																		(France)
France	Les Menuires																							•	•																																						(France)
France	Markstein																	•				•																																									(France)
France	Megève	•		•	•	•		•		•		•	•			•		•	•		•	•					•										×		•			×																					(France)
France	Méribel		•																						•	•				•																		•		•							•	1st place, gold medalist(s)					(France)
France	Montgenèvre																•																																														(France)
France	Morzine								•		•	•		•		•	•				•					•	•	•	•																																		(France)
France	Pra-Loup					•	•								•																																																(France)
France	Puy St. Vincent																		•	•	•																																										(France)
France	St. Gervais	•	•	•	•	•	•	•		•		•	•		•		•	•	•	•	•	•					•				•																																(France)
France	Serre Chevalier																										•								•																												(France)
France	Tignes																						•	•					•	•	•		•		•																												(France)
France	Val d'Isère			•	•	•	•	•	•	•	•	•	•	•	•	•	•	•	•		•	•	•	•	•	•		•	•	•	•	•	•	•	•	•	•	•		•	•	•	•	1st place, gold medalist(s)	•	•	×	•	•	•	•	•	•	•	•	•	•	•	•	•	•	•	(France)
France	Valloire																									•					•																																(France)
France	Val Thorens																							•																																							(France)
Germany	Bad Wiessee																•			•																																											(Germany)
Germany	Berchtesgaden	•		•		•	•		•		•	•	•	•	•		•				•													•	•		•																										(Germany)
Germany	Berlin																					•																																									(Germany)
Germany	Bischofswiesen																					•																																									(Germany)
Germany	Garmisch-Partenkirchen				•			•	•	•	•	•	1st place, gold medalist(s)	•		•	•	•	•	•		•				•	•	•	•	•	•	•	•		•	•	•	•	•	•	•	•	•	•	•	1st place, gold medalist(s)	•	•	×	•	•	•	•	•	•	•	•	•	•	•	•	•	(Germany)
Germany	Hindelang		•		•																																																										(Germany)
Germany	Lenggries														•		•																																														(Germany)
Germany	Munich																					•																								•	×	•	×	×	×												(Germany)
Germany	Oberstaufen	•	•	•	•	•	•					•	•		•	•	•				•						•																																				(Germany)
Germany	Ofterschwang																																	•		•					•		•	•			•	•			×		•		×								(Germany)
Germany	Pfronten							•	•			•	•	•	•	•	•			•		•																																									(Germany)
Germany	Todtnau																	•				•													•																												(Germany)
Germany	Zwiesel										•		•			•			•			•				•						•							•			•	×			•																	(Germany)
Italy	Abetone		•		•	•		•	•																																																						(Italy)
Italy	Alta Badia																				•	•	•		•	•	•	•	•	•	•	•	•	•	•		•	•	•	•	•	•	•	•	•	•	•	•	•	•	•	•	•	•	•	•	•	•	•	•	•	•	(Italy)
Italy	Aprica										•						•																																														(Italy)
Italy	Bardonecchia					•																																																									(Italy)
Italy	Bormio															•				1st place, gold medalist(s)			•						•	•	•	•	•	•	•	•	•	•		1st place, gold medalist(s)	•	•	•	•	•	•	•	•	•				•	•	•	•	•	•	•	•		•	(Italy)
Italy	Cervinia												•																																													×	×				(Italy)
Italy	Cortina d'Ampezzo			•						•	•	•	•		•		•		•						•			•	•	•	•	•	•	•	•	•	•	•	•	•	•	•	•	•	•	•	•	•	•	•	•	•	•	•	×	1st place, gold medalist(s)	•	•	•	•		•	(Italy)
Italy	Courmayeur											•						•	•	•		•	•	•	•																																						(Italy)
Italy	Kronplatz																																																			•	•	•		•	•	•	•	•	•	•	(Italy)
Italy	La Thuile																																																		•				•					•			(Italy)
Italy	Limone Piemonte														•	•		•	•																																												(Italy)
Italy	Livigno																																																												•		(Italy)
Italy	Madonna di Campiglio	•			•	•	•	•		•	•	•	•	•	•	•	•	•	•	•	•	•	•	•		•	•	•	•		•	•			•	•	•		•		•							•		•	•	•	•	•	•	•	•	•	•	•	•	•	(Italy)
Italy	Monte Bondone	•																																																													(Italy)
Italy	Piancavallo													•	•	•	•	•	•		•		•		•		•																																				(Italy)
Italy	Pila																•																																														(Italy)
Italy	San Sicario																•	•		•																				•		•																					(Italy)
Italy	Santa Caterina																			•					•		•		•						•					1st place, gold medalist(s)										•	•	•				•							(Italy)
Italy	Sestriere	•				•	•												•	•	•	•	•	•	•	•	•	•	•	•	•	1st place, gold medalist(s)	•	•	•	•		•	•	•			•	•		×						•			•			•		•			(Italy)
Italy	Tarvisio																																									•		•		•															•		(Italy)
Italy	Val di Fassa																																																							•			×		•	•	(Italy)
Italy	Val Gardena			•	1st place, gold medalist(s)		•	•		•		•	•	•	•	•	•	•	•	•	•	•	•	•	•	•	•	•	•		•	•		•	•	×	•	•	•	•	•	•	•	•	•	•	•	•	•	•	•	•	•	•	•	•	•	•	•	•	•	•	(Italy)
Italy	Val Zoldana																				•	•		•		•																																					(Italy)
Italy	Vipiteno			•					•		•																																																				(Italy)
Japan	Furano											•		•		•		•		•	•	•		•		•				•																																	(Japan)
Japan	Happo One																														•	•																															(Japan)
Japan	Morioka																										•	1st place, gold medalist(s)																																			(Japan)
Japan	Naeba							•		•																																									•				•								(Japan)
Japan	Shiga Kogen																							•								•				•		•			•																						(Japan)
New Zealand	Mount Hutt																									•																																					(New Zealand)
Norway	Geilo																				•				•																																						(Norway)
Norway	Hemsedal																				•				•																																						(Norway)
Norway	Lillehammer (Hafjell)																				•					•		•			•										•																			•	•		(Norway)
Norway	Lillehammer (Kvitfjell)																											•		•	•	•	•	•	•	•	•	•	•	•		•	•	•	•	•	•	•	•	•	•	•	•	•	•	×	•	•	•	•	•	•	(Norway)
Norway	Narvik																										•				•																																(Norway)
Norway	Oppdal																		•				•		•			•																																			(Norway)
Norway	Oslo		•											•		•			•																																		•	•									(Norway)
Norway	Stranda																								•																																						(Norway)
Norway	Voss				•				•			•				•																																															(Norway)
Poland	Zakopane								•																																																						(Poland)
Russia	Moscow																																														•	•															(Russia)
Russia	Rosa Khutor																																														•							×	•								(Russia)
Slovakia	Vysoké Tatry			•					•						•			•			•																																										(Slovakia)
Slovakia	Jasná													•			•		•																																•					•			•			•	(Slovakia)
Slovenia	Kranjska Gora		•	•	•						•			•			•	•	•	•	•	•	•	•	•	•	•	•		•	•	•	•	•	•		•	•	•	•	•	•	•	•	•	•	•	•	•	•	•	•	•	•	•	•	•	•	×	•	•	•	(Slovenia)
Slovenia	Maribor				•	•	•	•				•	•	•	•	•	•	•	•	•	•	•		•	•		•	•	•	•	•	•		•	•	•	•	•	•	•	•	×	•	•	•	×	×	•	×	•	•	•	×	•	×		×						(Slovenia)
South Korea	Yongpyong																																•		•			•			•																						(South Korea)
South Korea	Jeongseon																																																		•	•											(South Korea)
Spain	La Molina																																											•																			(Spain)
Spain	Sierra Nevada											•																•	•		1st place, gold medalist(s)			•								•																					(Spain)
Sweden	Åre			•		•						•		•		•			•		•		•		•			•		•			•	•	•	•	•	•	•	•	•	1st place, gold medalist(s)	•	•		•	•	•	•	•	•		•	1st place, gold medalist(s)	×	•	•	•	•	•	•	•	(Sweden)
Sweden	Gällivare																	•																																													(Sweden)
Sweden	Klövsjö																								•																																						(Sweden)
Sweden	Sälen																								•																																						(Sweden)
Sweden	Stockholm																																																		•	•	•	•									(Sweden)
Sweden	Sundsvall																										•																																				(Sweden)
Sweden	Tärnaby																	•																																													(Sweden)
Sweden	Vemdalen																								•			•																																			(Sweden)
Switzerland	Adelboden	•	•	•	•	•	•	•	•	•	•	•	•	•	•	•	•	•	•	•	•	•	•			•	•		•	•	•	•	•	•	•	•	•	•	•	•	•	•	•	•	•	•	•	•	•	•	•	•	•	•	•	•	•	•	•	•	•	•	(Switzerland)
Switzerland	Arosa											•	•		•		•			•																																											(Switzerland)
Switzerland	Crans-Montana											•		•		•	•				•	1st place, gold medalist(s)					•		•			•	•										•		•		•		•		•	•	•	•	•		•	•	•	•	•	1st place, gold medalist(s)	(Switzerland)
Switzerland	Davos																	•		•																																											(Switzerland)
Switzerland	Ebnat-Kappel											•				•																																															(Switzerland)
Switzerland	Flühli																					•																																									(Switzerland)
Switzerland	Grindelwald	•	•	•	•	•	•	•	•	•							•							•			•																																				(Switzerland)
Switzerland	Haute-Nendaz															•																																															(Switzerland)
Switzerland	Laax											•	•			•			•			•		•								•																															(Switzerland)
Switzerland	Lenzerheide																													•					•	•	•	•		•	•					•		•	•		•		•			•	•					•	(Switzerland)
Switzerland	Les Diablerets								•		•		•	•		•		•	•																																												(Switzerland)
Switzerland	Les Mosses												•																																																		(Switzerland)
Switzerland	Leukerbad																						•																																								(Switzerland)
Switzerland	Meiringen										•			•												•																																					(Switzerland)
Switzerland	Mürren					•																																																									(Switzerland)
Switzerland	Parpan																	•	•		•																																										(Switzerland)
Switzerland	Pontresina																	•																																													(Switzerland)
Switzerland	Saas-Fee																						•																																								(Switzerland)
Switzerland	St. Moritz					•	•	•	1st place, gold medalist(s)	•						•																		•	•	•	•	1st place, gold medalist(s)	•	•	•	×	•	•	•	•	•	•	•	•	•	1st place, gold medalist(s)	•	•	•	×	•	•	•	•	•	•	(Switzerland)
Switzerland	Verbier																	•	•																																												(Switzerland)
Switzerland	Veysonnaz																								•			•	•		•		•	•					•																								(Switzerland)
Switzerland	Villars													•																																																	(Switzerland)
Switzerland	Wangs-Pizol															•																																															(Switzerland)
Switzerland	Wengen	•	•	•	•		•	•	•	•	•	•	•		•	•	•		•	•	•	•		•	×	•	•			•		•	•	•	•	•	•	•	•	•	•	•	•	•	•	•	•	•	•	•	•	•	•	•	•	×	•	•	•	•	•	•	(Switzerland)
Switzerland	Zermatt																																																									×	×				(Switzerland)
Switzerland	Zinal																						•																																								(Switzerland)
United States	Anchorage							•																																																							(United States)
United States	Aspen		•								•			•		•	•	•	•	•	•	•	•	•		•	•	•	•					•		•	•	•		•	•	•	•	•	•	•	•	•		•	•	•						•	•				(United States)
United States	Beaver Creek																						•								•		•	1st place, gold medalist(s)	•	•	×	•	•	•	•	•	•	•	•	•	•	•	•	1st place, gold medalist(s)	•	×	•	•	•		•	•	×	•	•	•	(United States)
United States	Breckenridge																										•					•																															(United States)
United States	Copper Mountain										•																								•		•																								•	•	(United States)
United States	Crystal Mountain						•																																																								(United States)
United States	Franconia	•																																																													(United States)
United States	Heavenly Valley		•		•	•	•	•				•		•						•	•																																										(United States)
United States	Jackson Hole	•			•					•																																																					(United States)
United States	Killington																																																			•	•	•	•		•	•	•	•		•	(United States)
United States	Lake Placid													•					•	•	•																																										(United States)
United States	Mammoth Mountain																												•			•	•	•																													(United States)
United States	Ogden																																			×																											(United States)
United States	Palisades Tahoe (Squaw Valley)			•																																																•						•	•				(United States)
United States	Park City																			•	•	•			•		•	•	•	•	•	•	•	•		•	×	•	•																								(United States)
United States	Stratton Mountain												•																																																		(United States)
United States	Steamboat Springs																							•	•			•																																			(United States)
United States	Sugarloaf					•																																																									(United States)
United States	Sun Valley									•		•																																																•		•	(United States)
United States	Vail	•																•	•	•	•	•		1st place, gold medalist(s)	•	•	•	•	•	•	•	•		1st place, gold medalist(s)	•															1st place, gold medalist(s)													(United States)
United States	Waterville Valley			•									•		•		•	•	•	•	•	•			•	•																																					(United States)

• Locations that hosted the World Cup
× Locations present in the calendar, but whose races have all been cancelled
Locations that hosted the Winter Olympics
(gold) Locations that hosted the World Championships
