= List of FIS Alpine Ski World Cup races calendar =

Statistics on the Alpine Ski World Cup

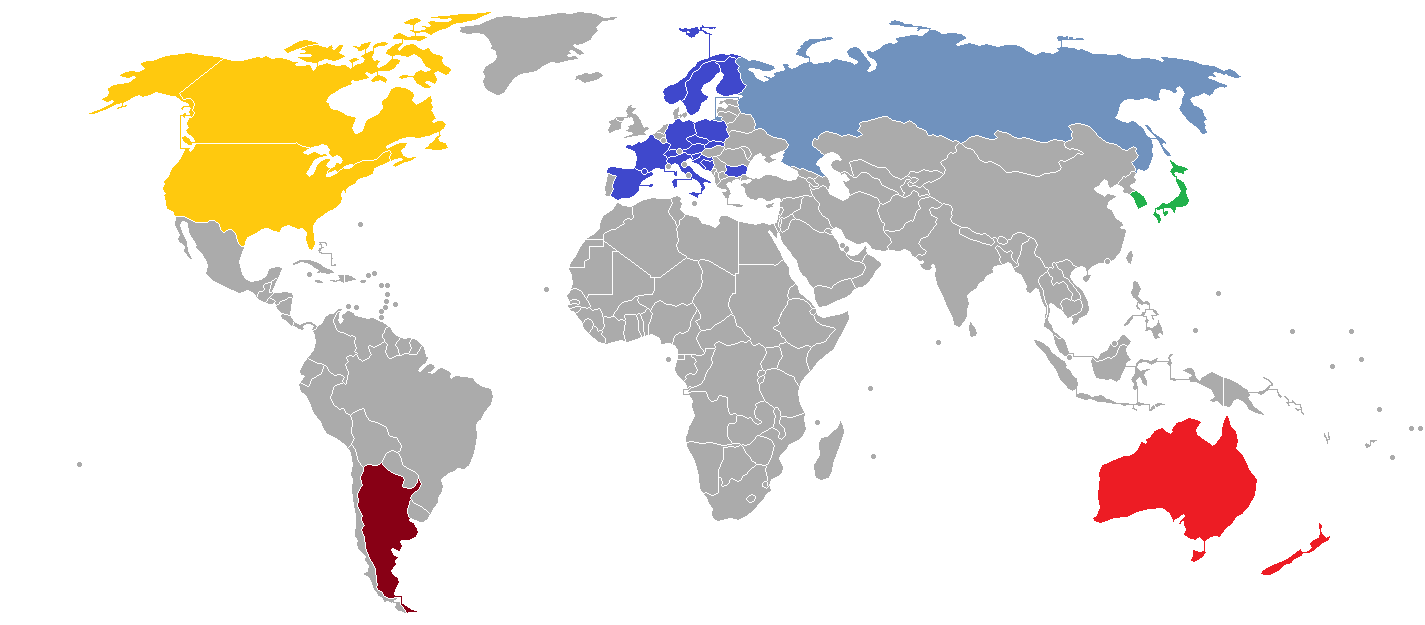
World Cup hosting countries

This calendar lists all the men's, women's, and team races of the FIS Alpine Ski World Cup from 1967 to the present.

== World Cup timeline ==
KB – Classic/Super/Alpine combined; PS – Parallel slalom; CE – City event (parallel); PG – Parallel giant slalom; K.O. – Knockout slalom
Season	Men										Ladies										Team		
Season	DH	SG	GS	SL	KB	PS	CE	PG	K.O.	Total	DH	SG	GS	SL	KB	PS	CE	PG	K.O.	Total	SC	PG	Total
1967	5	N/A	5	7	N/A	N/A	N/A	N/A	N/A	17	4	N/A	6	7	N/A	N/A	N/A	N/A	N/A	17	N/A	N/A	N/A
1968	5	N/A	7	8	N/A	N/A	N/A	N/A	N/A	20	6	N/A	7	10	N/A	N/A	N/A	N/A	N/A	23	N/A	N/A	N/A
1968–69	6	N/A	7	9	N/A	N/A	N/A	N/A	N/A	22	4	N/A	7	9	N/A	N/A	N/A	N/A	N/A	20	N/A	N/A	N/A
1969–70	6	N/A	11	11	N/A	N/A	N/A	N/A	N/A	28	5	N/A	9	12	N/A	N/A	N/A	N/A	N/A	26	N/A	N/A	N/A
1970–71	7	N/A	8	9	N/A	N/A	N/A	N/A	N/A	24	6	N/A	8	9	N/A	N/A	N/A	N/A	N/A	23	N/A	N/A	N/A
1971–72	7	N/A	7	7	N/A	N/A	N/A	N/A	N/A	21	7	N/A	7	7	N/A	N/A	N/A	N/A	N/A	21	N/A	N/A	N/A
1972–73	8	N/A	8	8	N/A	N/A	N/A	N/A	N/A	24	8	N/A	8	8	N/A	N/A	N/A	N/A	N/A	24	N/A	N/A	N/A
1973–74	7	N/A	7	7	N/A	N/A	N/A	N/A	N/A	21	5	N/A	6	6	N/A	N/A	N/A	N/A	N/A	17	N/A	N/A	N/A
1974–75	9	N/A	7	7	3	1	N/A	N/A	N/A	27	8	N/A	7	7	3	1	N/A	N/A	N/A	26	N/A	N/A	N/A
1975–76	8	N/A	7	7	3	N/A	N/A	N/A	N/A	25	7	N/A	8	8	3	N/A	N/A	N/A	N/A	26	N/A	N/A	N/A
1976–77	10	N/A	10	10	3	N/A	N/A	N/A	N/A	33	8	N/A	8	8	3	N/A	N/A	N/A	N/A	27	N/A	N/A	N/A
1977–78	8	N/A	7	7	—	N/A	N/A	N/A	N/A	22	7	N/A	8	7	N/A	N/A	N/A	N/A	N/A	22	N/A	N/A	N/A
1978–79	9	N/A	10	10	4	N/A	N/A	N/A	N/A	33	7	N/A	7	8	4	N/A	N/A	N/A	N/A	26	N/A	N/A	N/A
1979–80	7	N/A	8	8	4	N/A	N/A	N/A	N/A	27	7	N/A	8	9	4	N/A	N/A	N/A	N/A	28	N/A	N/A	N/A
1980–81	10	N/A	11	10	5	N/A	N/A	N/A	N/A	36	10	N/A	9	9	5	N/A	N/A	N/A	N/A	33	N/A	N/A	N/A
1981–82	10	N/A	9	9	5	N/A	N/A	N/A	N/A	33	8	N/A	9	10	4	N/A	N/A	N/A	N/A	31	N/A	N/A	N/A
1982–83	11	3	7	11	5	N/A	N/A	N/A	N/A	37	8	2	7	9	4	N/A	N/A	N/A	N/A	30	N/A	N/A	N/A
1983–84	10	4	8	10	5	N/A	N/A	N/A	N/A	37	8	2	7	11	6	N/A	N/A	N/A	N/A	34	N/A	N/A	N/A
1984–85	10	5	6	10	5	N/A	N/A	N/A	N/A	36	8	4	7	10	4	N/A	N/A	N/A	N/A	33	N/A	N/A	N/A
1985–86	13	5	7	13	7	N/A	N/A	N/A	N/A	45	10	5	8	9	5	N/A	N/A	N/A	N/A	37	N/A	N/A	N/A
1986–87	11	5	8	8	2	N/A	N/A	N/A	N/A	34	7	5	8	10	1	N/A	N/A	N/A	N/A	31	N/A	N/A	N/A
1987–88	10	4	6	8	2	N/A	N/A	N/A	N/A	30	8	4	6	8	2	N/A	N/A	N/A	N/A	28	N/A	N/A	N/A
1988–89	10	4	6	8	3	N/A	N/A	N/A	N/A	31	8	4	7	7	2	N/A	N/A	N/A	N/A	28	N/A	N/A	N/A
1989–90	9	6	7	10	2	N/A	N/A	N/A	N/A	34	8	6	8	9	2	N/A	N/A	N/A	N/A	33	N/A	N/A	N/A
1990–91	8	3	7	9	1	N/A	N/A	N/A	N/A	28	9	5	6	7	2	N/A	N/A	N/A	N/A	29	N/A	N/A	N/A
1991–92	9	6	7	9	3	N/A	N/A	N/A	N/A	34	7	6	7	8	2	N/A	N/A	N/A	N/A	30	N/A	N/A	N/A
1992–93	10	7	6	8	3	N/A	N/A	N/A	N/A	34	9	6	7	8	2	N/A	N/A	N/A	N/A	32	N/A	N/A	N/A
1993–94	11	5	9	8	2	N/A	N/A	N/A	N/A	35	7	6	9	10	2	N/A	N/A	N/A	N/A	34	N/A	N/A	N/A
1994–95	9	5	7	9	2	N/A	N/A	N/A	N/A	32	9	7	8	7	1	N/A	N/A	N/A	N/A	32	N/A	N/A	N/A
1995–96	9	6	9	9	2	N/A	N/A	N/A	N/A	35	9	7	7	10	1	N/A	N/A	N/A	N/A	34	N/A	N/A	N/A
1996–97	11	6	8	10	2	N/A	N/A	N/A	N/A	37	8	7	7	9	1	N/A	N/A	N/A	N/A	32	N/A	N/A	N/A
1997–98	11	5	9	9	2	1	N/A	N/A	N/A	37	6	6	8	9	2	2	N/A	N/A	N/A	33	N/A	N/A	N/A
1998–99	10	6	8	9	2	N/A	N/A	N/A	N/A	35	9	8	9	8	2	N/A	N/A	N/A	N/A	36	N/A	N/A	N/A
1999–00	11	7	9	11	2	N/A	N/A	N/A	N/A	40	10	8	11	10	1	N/A	N/A	N/A	N/A	40	N/A	N/A	N/A
2000–01	9	5	9	9	1	N/A	N/A	N/A	N/A	33	8	8	8	9	1	N/A	N/A	N/A	N/A	34	N/A	N/A	N/A
2001–02	10	6	8	9	2	N/A	N/A	N/A	N/A	35	9	5	9	9	2	N/A	N/A	N/A	N/A	34	N/A	N/A	N/A
2002–03	11	6	8	9	2	N/A	N/A	N/A	1	37	6	8	9	8	1	N/A	N/A	N/A	1	33	N/A	N/A	N/A
2003–04	12	7	7	11	2	N/A	N/A	N/A	N/A	39	9	8	8	10	N/A	N/A	N/A	N/A	N/A	35	N/A	N/A	N/A
2004–05	11	7	8	9	1	N/A	N/A	N/A	N/A	36	8	8	8	8	1	N/A	N/A	N/A	N/A	33	N/A	N/A	N/A
2005–06	9	6	8	10	4	N/A	N/A	N/A	N/A	37	8	8	9	9	2	N/A	N/A	N/A	N/A	36	1	N/A	1
2006–07	11	5	6	10	4	N/A	N/A	N/A	N/A	36	9	7	7	9	3	N/A	N/A	N/A	N/A	35	1	N/A	1
2007–08	9	7	8	11	5	N/A	N/A	N/A	N/A	40	9	7	7	9	3	N/A	N/A	N/A	N/A	35	—	N/A	—
2008–09	9	5	8	10	4	N/A	N/A	N/A	N/A	36	7	7	8	9	3	N/A	N/A	N/A	N/A	34	1	N/A	1
2009–10	8	6	7	9	4	N/A	N/A	N/A	N/A	34	8	7	7	8	2	N/A	N/A	N/A	N/A	32	N/A	1	1
2010–11	9	6	6	10	4	N/A	1	N/A	N/A	36	8	6	6	9	3	N/A	1	N/A	N/A	33	N/A	1	1
2011–12	11	8	9	11	4	N/A	1	N/A	N/A	44	8	7	9	10	2	N/A	1	N/A	N/A	37	N/A	1	1
2012–13	8	5	8	9	2	N/A	2	N/A	N/A	34	7	6	9	9	2	N/A	2	N/A	N/A	35	N/A	1	1
2013–14	9	6	8	9	2	N/A	N/A	N/A	N/A	34	9	6	8	8	1	N/A	N/A	N/A	N/A	32	N/A	2	2
2014–15	10	7	8	10	2	N/A	N/A	N/A	N/A	37	8	7	7	9	1	N/A	N/A	N/A	N/A	32	N/A	1	1
2015–16	11	8	10	10	3	N/A	1	1	N/A	44	9	8	9	10	3	N/A	1	N/A	N/A	40	N/A	1	1
2016–17	8	6	8	10	2	N/A	1	1	N/A	36	8	7	9	9	3	N/A	1	N/A	N/A	37	N/A	1	1
2017–18	9	6	7	9	2	N/A	2	1	N/A	36	8	8	8	9	2	1	2	N/A	N/A	38	N/A	1	1
2018–19	8	7	8	10	2	N/A	2	1	N/A	38	8	6	8	9	1	1	2	N/A	N/A	35	N/A	1	1
2019–20	9	6	7	9	3	N/A	N/A	2	N/A	36	8	6	6	6	2	1	N/A	1	N/A	30	N/A	—	—
2020–21	7	6	10	11	N/A	N/A	N/A	1	N/A	35	7	6	8	9	N/A	N/A	N/A	1	N/A	31	N/A	1	1
2021–22	11	7	8	10	N/A	N/A	N/A	1	N/A	37	9	9	9	9	N/A	N/A	N/A	1	N/A	37	N/A	1	1
Total events	514	230	437	518	134	2	10	8	1	1854	433	253	435	487	106	6	10	3	1	1734	3	13	16
Double wins	4	4	1	2	—	—	—	—	—	11	3	3	5	4	—	—	—	—	—	15	—	—	—
Triple wins	—	—	—	—	—	—	—	—	—	—	—	1	1	—	—	—	—	—	—	2	—	—	—
Total winners	519	234	438	520	134	2	10	8	1	1866	436	259	442	491	106	6	10	3	1	1754	3	13	16
Diff. winners	119	83	101	117	40	2	8	8	1	303	100	82	101	110	41	5	8	3	1	254	2	7	7

Last updated: 20 March 2022
