= 1967 Alpine Skiing World Cup – Men's overall =

1967 men's overall World Cup
Previous: none	Next: 1968

Men's overall World Cup 1966/1967

== Final point standings ==
In men's overall World Cup 1966/67 the best three downhills, best three giant slaloms and best three slaloms count. Deductions are given in ().

Place	Name	Country	Total points	Total deduction	Downhill		Giant slalom		Slalom
1	Jean-Claude Killy	France	225	(121)	75	(50)	75	(40)	75	(31)
2	Heinrich Messner	Austria	114	(24)	31	(10)	32	(7)	51	(7)
3	Guy Périllat	France	108	(15)	37		13	(1)	58	(14)
4	Léo Lacroix	France	93		24		39		30
5	Georges Mauduit	France	82		0		60		22
6	Jimmy Heuga	United States	70		0		42		28
7	Karl Schranz	Austria	62	(5)	9		21		32	(5)
8	Herbert Huber	Austria	58	(3)	0		14		44	(3)
9	Werner Bleiner	Austria	48		4		27		17
10	Louis Jauffret	France	46	(11)	0		0		46	(11)
	Jules Melquiond	France	46	(6)	0		0		46	(6)
	Dumeng Giovanoli	Switzerland	46		0		23		23
13	Gerhard Nenning	Austria	44	(3)	33	(3)	3		8
14	Franz Vogler	West Germany	36		36		0		0
15	Scott Henderson	Canada	32		0		16		16
16	Hans Peter Rohr	Switzerland	31		31		0		0
17	Bernard Orcel	France	30	(2)	28	(2)	0		2
18	Egon Zimmermann	Austria	23		19		0		4
19	Jean-Daniel Dätwyler	Switzerland	22	(1)	22	(1)	0		0
	Ivo Mahlknecht	Italy	22		16		3		3
21	Willy Favre	Switzerland	20		0		20		0
	Bengt-Erik Grahn	Sweden	20		0		0		20
23	Carlo Senoner	Italy	16		0		0		16
24	Jim Barrows	United States	15		15		0		0
25	Josef Minsch	Switzerland	12	(1)	12	(1)	0		0
26	Stefan Kälin	Switzerland	11		0		11		0
27	Peter Rohr	Switzerland	10		10		0		0
	Rod Hebron	Canada	10		0		2		8
29	Roger Rossat-Mignod	France	8		0		8		0
	Jakob Tischhauser	Switzerland	8		0		8		0
	Alain Penz	France	8		0		0		8
	Olle Rolén	Sweden	8		0		0		8
	Robert Swan	Canada	8		0		4		4
34	Spider Sabich	United States	6		0		0		6
35	Rudi Sailer	Austria	4		0		4		0
36	Gerhard Mussner	Italy	3		3		0		0
	Rune Lindström	Sweden	3		0		0		3
	Stefan Sodat	Austria	3		3		0		0
	John Clough	United States	3		0		0		3
	Andreas Sprecher	Switzerland	3		1		0		2
41	Willi Lesch	West Germany	2		0		0		2
	Edmund Bruggmann	Switzerland	2		0		2		0
	Dennis McCoy	United States	2		0		0		2
44	Bruno Piazzalunga	Italy	1		0		1		0
	Henri Duvillard	France	1		0		0		1
	Lars Olsson	Sweden	1		0		0		1
	Rick Chaffee	United States	1		0		1		0

Alpine skiing World Cup
Men

Overall | Downhill | Giant slalom | Slalom

1967
