= 1967 Alpine Skiing World Cup – Men's downhill =

1967 Men's downhill World Cup
Previous: none	Next: 1968

Men's downhill World Cup 1966/1967

== Calendar ==
Round	Race no.	Place	Country	Date	Winner	Second	Third
1	4	Wengen	Switzerland	January 14, 1967	(France) Jean-Claude Killy	(France) Léo Lacroix	(Switzerland) Jean-Daniel Dätwyler
2	6	Kitzbühel	Austria	January 21, 1967	(France) Jean-Claude Killy	(West Germany) Franz Vogler	(Austria) Heinrich Messner
3	8	Megève	France	January 27, 1967	(France) Jean-Claude Killy	(Switzerland) Hans Peter Rohr	(West Germany) Franz Vogler
4	11	Sestriere	Italy	March 3, 1967	(France) Jean-Claude Killy	(France) Bernard Orcel	(France) Guy Périllat
5	12	Franconia	United States	March 10, 1967	(France) Jean-Claude Killy	(France) Guy Périllat	(United States) Jim Barrows

== Final point standings ==
The best three results count. Deductions are given in parentheses.

Place	Name	Country	Total points	Deduction	4 (Switzerland)	6 (Austria)	8 (France)	11 (Italy)	12 (United States)
1	Jean-Claude Killy	France	75	(50)	25	25	25	(25)	(25)
2	Guy Périllat	France	37		-	2	-	15	20
3	Franz Vogler	West Germany	36		1	20	15	-	-
4	Gerhard Nenning	Austria	33	(3)	(1)	11	11	11	(2)
5	Heinrich Messner	Austria	31	(10)	(4)	15	(6)	8	8
5	Hans Peter Rohr	Switzerland	31		-	-	20	-	11
7	Bernard Orcel	France	28	(2)	2	6	(2)	20	-
8	Léo Lacroix	France	24		20	1	3	-	-
9	Jean-Daniel Dätwyler	Switzerland	22	(1)	15	4	(1)	-	3
10	Egon Zimmermann	Austria	19		11	8	-	-	-
11	Ivo Mahlknecht	Italy	16		8	-	8	-	-
12	Jim Barrows	United States	15		-	-	-	-	15
13	Josef Minsch	Switzerland	12	(1)	6	-	4	2	(1)
14	Peter Rohr	Switzerland	10		-	-	-	6	4
15	Karl Schranz	Austria	9		-	3	-	-	6
16	Werner Bleiner	Austria	4		-	-	-	4	-
17	Gerhard Mussner	Italy	3		3	-	-	-	-
	Stefan Sodat	Austria	3		-	-	-	3	-
19	Andreas Sprecher	Switzerland	1		-	-	-	1	-

== Men's downhill team results ==
All points are shown including individual deduction. Bold indicates highest score; italics indicate race wins.

Place	Country	Total points	4 (Switzerland)	6 (Austria)	8 (France)	11 (Italy)	12 (United States)	Racers	Wins
1	France	216	47	34	30	**60**	45	4	5
2	Austria	112	16	37	17	26	16	6	0
3	Switzerland	78	21	4	25	9	19	5	0
4	West Germany	36	1	20	15	-	-	1	0
5	Italy	19	11	-	8	-	-	2	0
6	United States	15	-	-	-	-	15	1	0

**Alpine Skiing World Cup**
**Men**

Overall | Downhill | Giant slalom | Slalom

**1967**
