= 1968 Alpine Skiing World Cup – Men's downhill =

1968 Men's downhill World Cup
| Previous: 1967 | Next: 1969 |

Men's downhill World Cup 1967/1968

== Calendar ==
| Round | Race no. | Place | Country | Date | Winner | Second | Third |
|---|---|---|---|---|---|---|---|
| 1 | 3 | Wengen | Switzerland | January 13, 1968 | (Austria) Gerhard Nenning | (Austria) Karl Schranz | (Switzerland) Edmund Bruggmann |
| 2 | 5 | Kitzbühel | Austria | January 20, 1968 | (Austria) Gerhard Nenning | (France) Jean-Claude Killy | (Switzerland) Andreas Sprecher |
| 3 | 7 | Grenoble | France | February 9, 1968 | (France) Jean-Claude Killy | (France) Guy Périllat | (Switzerland) Jean-Daniel Dätwyler |
| 4 | 10 | Chamonix | France | February 24, 1968 | (France) Bernard Orcel | (Switzerland) Kurt Huggler | (France) Guy Périllat |
| 5 | 15 | Aspen | United States | March 15, 1968 | (Austria) Gerhard Nenning | (Austria) Heinrich Messner | (France) Jean-Claude Killy |

Note: Round 3/Race 7 was the Olympic event, which counts also for the World Cup. See also 1968 Winter Olympics and Alpine skiing at the 1968 Winter Olympics.

== Final point standings ==
The best three results count. Deductions are given in parentheses.

| Place | Name | Country | Total points | Deduction | 3 (Switzerland) | 5 (Austria) | 7 (France) | 10 (France) | 15 (United States) |
|---|---|---|---|---|---|---|---|---|---|
| 1 | Gerhard Nenning | Austria | 75 | (2) | 25 | 25 | (2) | - | 25 |
| 2 | Jean-Claude Killy | France | 60 | | - | 20 | 25 | - | 15 |
| 3 | Karl Schranz | Austria | 39 | (8) | 20 | 11 | 8 | - | (8) |
| 4 | Bernard Orcel | France | 37 | (3) | 4 | 8 | (3) | 25 | - |
| | Guy Périllat | France | 37 | | 2 | - | 20 | 15 | - |
| | Jean-Daniel Dätwyler | Switzerland | 37 | (3) | 11 | - | 15 | 11 | (3) |
| 7 | Heinrich Messner | Austria | 31 | | - | - | 11 | - | 20 |
| 8 | Kurt Huggler | Switzerland | 20 | | - | - | - | 20 | - |
| 9 | Edmund Bruggmann | Switzerland | 17 | | 15 | 1 | 1 | - | - |
| | Billy Kidd | United States | 17 | | - | 6 | - | - | 11 |
| 11 | Andreas Sprecher | Switzerland | 15 | | - | 15 | - | - | - |
| 12 | Josef Minsch | Switzerland | 10 | | 8 | 2 | - | - | - |
| | Franz Vogler | West Germany | 10 | | - | - | - | 8 | 2 |
| | Rudi Sailer | Austria | 10 | | 3 | - | - | 6 | 1 |
| 15 | Dodge Phelps | United States | 8 | | - | - | - | - | 8 |
| 16 | Dumeng Giovanoli | Switzerland | 6 | | 6 | - | - | - | - |
| | Ivo Mahlknecht | Italy | 6 | | - | - | 6 | - | - |
| 18 | Ludwig Leitner | West Germany | 4 | | - | 4 | - | - | - |
| | Gerhard Mussner | Italy | 4 | | - | 4 | - | - | - |
| | Gerhard Prinzing | West Germany | 4 | | - | - | 4 | - | - |
| | Hansjörg Schlager | West Germany | 4 | | - | - | - | 4 | - |
| | Spider Sabich | United States | 4 | | - | - | - | - | 4 |
| 23 | Peter Rohr | Switzerland | 3 | | - | - | - | 3 | - |
| 24 | Hans Zingre | Switzerland | 2 | | - | - | - | 2 | - |
| 25 | Egon Zimmermann | Austria | 1 | | 1 | - | - | - | - |
| | Michel Dätwyler | Switzerland | 1 | | - | - | - | 1 | - |

Alpine Skiing World Cup
Men

Overall | Downhill | Giant slalom | Slalom

1968
