= 1967 FIS Alpine Ski World Cup =

International sports competition

FIS Alpine Ski World Cup 1967
Discipline	Men	Women
Overall	(France) Jean-Claude Killy	(Canada) Nancy Greene
Downhill	(France) Jean-Claude Killy	(France) Marielle Goitschel
Giant slalom	(France) Jean-Claude Killy	(Canada) Nancy Greene
Slalom	(France) Jean-Claude Killy	(France) Annie Famose
Nations Cup	France	France
- Nations Cup overall: France

Competition
Locations	10	9
Individual	17	17

The 1st World Cup races began in early January in West Germany and concluded in late March in the United States. Jean-Claude Killy of France dominated the men's competition, winning each of the three disciplines and the overall title. Nancy Greene of Canada edged out Marielle Goitschel of France for the women's overall title, her first of two consecutive titles, defending successfully in 1968.

Killy's 12 race wins for the season (amazingly, out of only 17 races during the season) stood as the record for wins in a season by a skier (male or female) until Ingemar Stenmark won 13 races in 1978-79.

== Calendar ==
=== Men ===
Event key: DH – Downhill, SL – Slalom, GS – Giant slalom
Race	Season	Date	Place	Type	Winner	Second	Third
1	1	5 January 1967	(West Germany) Berchtesgaden	SL _{001}	(Austria) Heinrich Messner	(France) Jules Melquiond	(Switzerland) Dumeng Giovanoli
2	2	6 January 1967	(West Germany) Berchtesgaden	GS _{001}	(France) Georges Mauduit	(France) Léo Lacroix	(France) Jean-Claude Killy
3	3	9 January 1967	(Switzerland) Adelboden	GS _{002}	(France) Jean-Claude Killy	(Switzerland) Willy Favre	(France) Georges Mauduit
4	4	14 January 1967	(Switzerland) Wengen	DH _{001}	(France) Jean-Claude Killy	(France) Léo Lacroix	(Switzerland) Jean-Daniel Dätwyler
5	5	15 January 1967	(Switzerland) Wengen	SL _{002}	(France) Jean-Claude Killy	(Austria) Heinrich Messner	(France) Jules Melquiond
6	6	21 January 1967	(Austria) Kitzbühel	DH _{002}	(France) Jean-Claude Killy	(West Germany) Franz Vogler	(Austria) Heinrich Messner
7	7	22 January 1967	(Austria) Kitzbühel	SL _{003}	(France) Jean-Claude Killy	(Sweden) Bengt Erik Grahn	(France) Louis Jauffret
8	8	27 January 1967	(France) Megève	DH _{003}	(France) Jean-Claude Killy	(Switzerland) Hans Peter Rohr	(West Germany) Franz Vogler
9	9	29 January 1967	(France) Megève	SL _{004}	(France) Guy Périllat	(France) Jean-Claude Killy	(Austria) Karl Schranz
10	10	5 February 1967	(Italy) Madonna di Campiglio	SL _{005}	(France) Guy Périllat	(France) Louis Jauffret	(France) Léo Lacroix
11	11	3 March 1967	(Italy) Sestriere	DH _{004}	(France) Jean-Claude Killy	(France) Bernard Orcel	(France) Guy Périllat
12	12	10 March 1967	(United States) Franconia	DH _{005}	(France) Jean-Claude Killy	(France) Guy Périllat	(United States) Jim Barrows
13	13	11 March 1967	(United States) Franconia	SL _{006}	(France) Jean-Claude Killy	(United States) Jimmy Heuga	(Austria) Herbert Huber
14	14	12 March 1967	(United States) Franconia	GS _{003}	(France) Jean-Claude Killy	(France) Georges Mauduit	(Switzerland) Dumeng Giovanoli
15	15	19 March 1967	(United States) Vail	GS _{004}	(France) Jean-Claude Killy	(United States) Jimmy Heuga	(Austria) Heinrich Messner
16	16	25 March 1967	(United States) Jackson Hole	GS _{005}	(France) Jean-Claude Killy	(United States) Jimmy Heuga	(Austria) Werner Bleiner
17	17	26 March 1967	(United States) Jackson Hole	SL _{007}	(Austria) Herbert Huber	(France) Georges Mauduit	(Austria) Werner Bleiner

=== Women ===
Event key: DH – Downhill, SL – Slalom, GS – Giant slalom
Race	Season	Date	Place	Type	Winner	Second	Third
1	1	7 January 1967	(West Germany) Oberstaufen	SL _{001}	(Canada) Nancy Greene	(Switzerland) Fernande Bochatay	(France) Annie Famose
2	2	8 January 1967	(West Germany) Oberstaufen	GS _{001}	(Canada) Nancy Greene	(West Germany) Burgl Färbinger	(Switzerland) Fernande Bochatay
3	3	10 January 1967	(Switzerland) Grindelwald	SL _{002}	(France) Annie Famose	(United Kingdom) Gina Hathorn	(France) Isabelle Mir
4	4	11 January 1967	(Switzerland) Grindelwald	GS _{002}	(Canada) Nancy Greene	(France) Annie Famose	(France) Marielle Goitschel
5	5	13 January 1967	(Switzerland) Grindelwald	DH _{001}	(Canada) Nancy Greene	(France) Isabelle Mir	(France) Florence Steurer
6	6	18 January 1967	(Austria) Schruns	DH _{002}	(France) Marielle Goitschel	(Austria) Erika Schinegger	(France) Annie Famose
7	7	19 January 1967	(Austria) Schruns	SL _{003}	(France) Marielle Goitschel	(France) Annie Famose	(Canada) Nancy Greene
8	8	26 January 1967	(France) St. Gervais	SL _{004}	(France) Annie Famose	(France) Marielle Goitschel	(France) Florence Steurer
9	9	28 January 1967	(France) St. Gervais	GS _{003}	(Austria) Erika Schinegger	(France) Marielle Goitschel	(France) Annie Famose
10	10	1 February 1967	(Italy) Monte Bondone	SL _{005}	(West Germany) Burgl Färbinger	(France) Annie Famose	(Austria) Traudl Hecher
11	11	3 March 1967	(Italy) Sestriere	DH _{003}	(Italy) Giustina Demetz (France) Marielle Goitschel		(France) Florence Steurer
12	12	10 March 1967	(United States) Franconia	DH _{004}	(France) Isabelle Mir	(Austria) Erika Schinegger	(France) Annie Famose
13	13	11 March 1967	(United States) Franconia	GS _{004}	(France) Christine Béranger	(France) Florence Steurer	(Canada) Nancy Greene
14	14	12 March 1967	(United States) Franconia	SL _{006}	(France) Marielle Goitschel	(France) Isabelle Mir	(France) Annie Famose
15	15	19 March 1967	(United States) Vail	GS _{005}	(Canada) Nancy Greene	(Austria) Erika Schinegger	(France) Annie Famose
16	16	24 Mar 1967	(United States) Jackson Hole	GS _{006}	(Canada) Nancy Greene	(Austria) Erika Schinegger	(Austria) Traudl Hecher
17	17	26 Mar 1967	(United States) Jackson Hole	SL _{007}	(Canada) Nancy Greene	(France) Marielle Goitschel	(France) Florence Steurer

== Men ==
For the overall title and in each discipline standings in 1967, the best three downhills, best three giant slaloms and best three slaloms count. Point deduction is given in ().

=== Overall ===
see complete table

Killy won 12 of 15, no points in two events. He won the overall with max points.
Place	Name	Country	Total	DH	GS	SL
1	Jean-Claude Killy	France	225	75	75	75
2	Heinrich Messner	Austria	114	31	32	51
3	Guy Périllat	France	108	37	13	58
4	Léo Lacroix	France	93	24	39	30
5	Georges Mauduit	France	82	0	60	22
6	Jimmy Heuga	United States	70	0	42	28
7	Karl Schranz	Austria	62	9	21	32
8	Herbert Huber	Austria	58	0	14	44
9	Werner Bleiner	Austria	48	4	27	17
10	Louis Jauffret	France	46	0	0	46

=== Downhill ===
see complete table

Jean-Claude Killy won the cup with maximum points by winning all 5 events.
Place	Name	Country	Total	4 (Switzerland)	6 (Austria)	8 (France)	11 (Italy)	12 (United States)
1	Jean-Claude Killy	France	75	25	25	25	(25)	(25)
2	Guy Périllat	France	37	–	2	–	15	20
3	Franz Vogler	West Germany	36	1	20	15	–	–
4	Gerhard Nenning	Austria	33	(1)	11	11	11	(2)
5	Heinrich Messner	Austria	31	(4)	15	(6)	8	8
5	Hans Peter Rohr	Switzerland	31	–	–	20	–	11
7	Bernard Orcel	France	28	2	6	(2)	20	–
8	Léo Lacroix	France	24	20	1	3	–	–
9	Jean-Daniel Dätwyler	Switzerland	22	15	4	(1)	–	3
10	Egon Zimmermann	Austria	19	11	8	–	–	–

=== Giant slalom ===
see complete table

Jean-Claude Killy won the cup with maximum points.
Place	Name	Country	Total	2 (Germany)	3 (Switzerland)	14 (United States)	15 (United States)	16 (United States)
1	Jean-Claude Killy	France	75	(15)	25	25	25	(25)
2	Georges Mauduit	France	60	25	15	20	–	–
3	Jimmy Heuga	United States	42	–	2	–	20	20
4	Léo Lacroix	France	39	20	11	–	8	–
5	Heinrich Messner	Austria	32	(3)	(4)	11	15	6
6	Werner Bleiner	Austria	27	–	8	4	–	15
7	Dumeng Giovanoli	Switzerland	23	–	–	15	–	8
8	Karl Schranz	Austria	21	4	–	6	11	–
9	Willy Favre	Switzerland	20	–	20	–	–	–
10	Scott Henderson	Canada	16	–	–	8	6	2

=== Slalom ===
see complete table

Jean-Claude Killy won the cup with maximum points.
Place	Name	Country	Total	1 (Germany)	5 (Switzerland)	7 (Austria)	9 (France)	10 (Italy)	13 (United States)	17 (United States)
1	Jean-Claude Killy	France	75	(11)	25	25	(20)	–	25	–
2	Guy Périllat	France	58	(6)	8	(8)	25	25	–	–
3	Heinrich Messner	Austria	51	25	20	(4)	(3)	6	–	–
4	Louis Jauffret	France	46	–	11	15	(11)	20	–	–
	Jules Melquiond	France	46	20	15	–	–	11	(6)	–
6	Herbert Huber	Austria	44	(3)	–	–	–	4	15	25
7	Karl Schranz	Austria	32	(4)	6	11	15	–	(1)	–
8	Léo Lacroix	France	30	–	–	–	4	15	–	11
9	Jimmy Heuga	United States	28	–	–	2	6	–	20	–
10	Dumeng Giovanoli	Switzerland	23	15	–	–	–	–	–	8

== Women ==
=== Overall ===
see complete table

For the overall title in 1967, the best three downhills, best three giant slaloms and best three slaloms counted. 11 racers had a point deduction. The championship was decided in the last race of the season.

Place	Name	Country	Total	DH	GS	SL
1	Nancy Greene	Canada	176	36	75	65
2	Marielle Goitschel	France	172	56	46	70
3	Annie Famose	France	158	38	50	70
4	Isabelle Mir	France	115	47	22	46
5	Florence Steurer	France	114	34	39	41
6	Erika Schinegger	Austria	110	40	65	5
7	Burgl Färbinger	West Germany	65	5	22	38
	Traudl Hecher	Austria	65	13	20	32
9	Giustina Demetz	Italy	64	42	15	7
10	Christine Béranger	France	48	0	37	11
11	Fernande Bochatay	Switzerland	39	0	19	20
12	Inge Jochum	Austria	30	8	22	0
13	Penny McCoy	United States	25	0	3	22
14	Gina Hathorn	United Kingdom	23	0	0	23
15	Annerösli Zryd	Switzerland	22	22	0	0

=== Downhill ===
see complete table

In women's downhill World Cup 1966/67 the best 3 results count. Two racers had a point deduction, which are given in (). For the very first time there was a shared win, when Marielle Goitschel and Giustina Demetz tied at Sestriere.

Place	Name	Country	Total	5 (Switzerland)	6 (Austria)	11 (Italy)	12 (United States)
1	Marielle Goitschel	France	56	6	25	25	–
2	Isabelle Mir	France	47	20	2	–	25
3	Giustina Demetz	Italy	42	11	(1)	25	6
4	Erika Schinegger	Austria	40	–	20	–	20
5	Annie Famose	France	38	–	15	8	15
6	Nancy Greene	Canada	36	25	11	–	–
7	Florence Steurer	France	34	15	4	15	(4)
8	Annerösli Zryd	Switzerland	22	–	–	11	11
9	Traudl Hecher	Austria	13	3	8	–	2
10	Suzy Chaffee	United States	12	8	3	–	1

=== Giant slalom ===
see complete table

In women's giant slalom World Cup 1966/67 the best 3 results count. Eight racers had a point deduction, which are given in (). Nancy Greene won four races. She won the cup with maximum points.

Place	Name	Country	Total	2 (Germany)	4 (Switzerland)	9 (France)	13 (United States)	15 (United States)	16 (United States)
1	Nancy Greene	Canada	75	25	25	–	(15)	25	(25)
2	Erika Schinegger	Austria	65	–	–	25	(11)	20	20
3	Annie Famose	France	50	–	20	15	(3)	15	(8)
4	Marielle Goitschel	France	46	(8)	15	20	(4)	(6)	11
5	Florence Steurer	France	39	(6)	8	11	20	(4)	–
6	Christine Béranger	France	37	–	11	–	25	1	–
7	Burgl Färbinger	West Germany	22	20	2	–	–	–	–
	Inge Jochum	Austria	22	11	–	–	–	11	–
	Isabelle Mir	France	22	(2)	–	8	–	8	6
10	Traudl Hecher	Austria	20	3	–	2	(2)	(2)	15

=== Slalom ===
see complete table

In women's slalom World Cup 1966/67 the best 3 results count. Six racers had a point deduction, which are given in ().

Place	Name	Country	Total	1 (Germany)	3 (Switzerland)	7 (Austria)	8 (France)	10 (Italy)	14 (United States)	17 (United States)
1	Annie Famose	France	70	(15)	25	20	25	(20)	(15)	–
	Marielle Goitschel	France	70	–	(11)	25	20	–	25	(20)
3	Nancy Greene	Canada	65	25	–	15	–	–	–	25
4	Isabelle Mir	France	46	–	15	–	(8)	–	20	11
5	Florence Steurer	France	41	11	–	–	15	–	–	15
6	Burgl Färbinger	West Germany	38	2	–	11	–	25	–	–
7	Traudl Hecher	Austria	32	6	(2)	–	11	15	–	–
8	Gina Hathorn	United Kingdom	23	–	20	–	–	3	–	–
9	Penny McCoy	United States	22	–	8	–	6	–	8	–
10	Fernande Bochatay	Switzerland	20	20	–	–	–	–	–	–

== Nations Cup ==
=== Overall ===
Place	Country	Total	Men	Ladies
1	France	1547	802	745
2	Austria	684	391	293
3	Canada	274	50	224
4	Switzerland	264	167	97
5	United States	174	97	77
6	Italy	127	42	85
7	West Germany	115	38	77
8	Sweden	32	32	0
9	United Kingdom	23	0	23

=== Men ===
French racers won 15 races out of 17 – Austrian races were only able to win the first and the last event.

Place	Country	Total	DH	GS	SL	Racers	Wins
1	France	802	216	236	350	11	15
2	Austria	391	112	108	171	8	2
3	Switzerland	167	78	64	25	9	0
4	United States	97	15	43	39	6	0
5	Canada	50	0	22	28	3	0
6	Italy	42	19	4	19	4	0
7	West Germany	38	36	0	2	2	0
8	Sweden	32	0	0	32	4	0

=== Women ===
Place	Country	Total	DH	GS	SL	Racers	Wins
1	France	745	183	235	327	7	8
2	Austria	293	72	143	78	8	1
3	Canada	224	36	115	73	2	7
4	Switzerland	97	26	31	40	5	0
5	Italy	85	45	15	25	3	1
6	West Germany	77	11	22	44	3	1
	United States	77	12	9	56	8	0
8	United Kingdom	23	0	0	23	1	0

== Medal table ==
Rank	Nation	Gold	Silver	Bronze	Total
1	France	23	18	18	59
2	Canada	7	0	2	9
3	Austria	3	5	8	16
4	Germany	1	2	1	4
5	Italy	1	0	0	1
6	Switzerland	0	3	4	7
7	United States	0	3	1	4
8	Great Britain	0	1	0	1
8	Sweden	0	1	0	1
Totals (9 entries)		35	33	34	102
