= 1967 Alpine Skiing World Cup – Men's slalom =

1967 Men's slalom World Cup
Previous: none	Next: 1968

Men's slalom World Cup 1966/1967

== Calendar ==
Round	Race No	Place	Country	Date	Winner	Second	Third
1	1	Berchtesgaden	West Germany	January 5, 1967	(Austria) Heinrich Messner	(France) Jules Melquiond	(Switzerland) Dumeng Giovanoli
2	5	Wengen	Switzerland	January 15, 1967	(France) Jean-Claude Killy	(Austria) Heinrich Messner	(France) Jules Melquiond
3	7	Kitzbühel	Austria	January 22, 1967	(France) Jean-Claude Killy	(Sweden) Bengt-Erik Grahn	(France) Louis Jauffret
4	9	Megève	France	January 29, 1967	(France) Guy Périllat	(France) Jean-Claude Killy	(Austria) Karl Schranz
5	10	Madonna di Campiglio	Italy	February 5, 1967	(France) Guy Périllat	(France) Louis Jauffret	(France) Léo Lacroix
6	13	Franconia	United States	March 11, 1967	(France) Jean-Claude Killy	(United States) Jimmy Heuga	(Austria) Herbert Huber
7	17	Jackson Hole	United States	March 26, 1967	(Austria) Herbert Huber	(France) Georges Mauduit	(Austria) Werner Bleiner

== Final point standings ==
In 1967, only the best three results counted; deductions are given in ().
Points were only awarded for top ten finishes (see scoring system).

Place	Name	Country	Total points	Deduction	1 (Germany)	5 (Switzerland)	7 (Austria)	9 (France)	10 (Italy)	13 (United States)	17 (United States)
1	Jean-Claude Killy	France	75	(31)	(11)	25	25	(20)	-	25	-
2	Guy Périllat	France	58	(14)	(6)	8	(8)	25	25	-	-
3	Heinrich Messner	Austria	51	(7)	25	20	(4)	(3)	6	-	-
4	Louis Jauffret	France	46	(11)	-	11	15	(11)	20	-	-
	Jules Melquiond	France	46	(6)	20	15	-	-	11	(6)	-
6	Herbert Huber	Austria	44	(3)	(3)	-	-	-	4	15	25
7	Karl Schranz	Austria	32	(5)	(4)	6	11	15	-	(1)	-
8	Léo Lacroix	France	30		-	-	-	4	15	-	11
9	Jimmy Heuga	United States	28		-	-	2	6	-	20	-
10	Dumeng Giovanoli	Switzerland	23		15	-	-	-	-	-	8
11	Georges Mauduit	France	22		-	2	-	-	-	-	20
12	Bengt-Erik Grahn	Sweden	20		-	-	20	-	-	-	-
13	Werner Bleiner	Austria	17		-	-	-	-	-	2	15
14	Carlo Senoner	Italy	16		8	-	6	-	2	-	-
	Scott Henderson	Canada	16		-	1	-	-	-	11	4
16	Gerhard Nenning	Austria	8		-	3	2	-	-	3	-
	Alain Penz	France	8		-	-	-	8	-	-	-
	Olle Rolén	Sweden	8		-	-	-	-	8	-	-
	Rod Hebron	Canada	8		-	-	-	-	-	8	-
20	Spider Sabich	United States	6		-	-	-	-	-	-	6
21	Egon Zimmermann	Austria	4		-	4	-	-	-	-	-
	Robert Swan	Canada	4		-	-	-	-	-	4	-
23	Rune Lindström	Sweden	3		-	-	3	-	-	-	-
	Ivo Mahlknecht	Italy	3		-	-	-	-	3	-	-
	John Clough	United States	3		-	-	-	-	-	-	3
26	Willi Lesch	West Germany	2		2	-	-	-	-	-	-
	Bernard Orcel	France	2		-	-	-	2	-	-	-
	Dennis McCoy	United States	2		-	-	-	-	-	-	2
	Andreas Sprecher	Switzerland	2		1	-	-	-	-	-	1
30	Henri Duvillard	France	1		-	-	-	1	-	-	-
	Lars Olsson	Sweden	1		-	-	-	-	1	-	-

== Men's slalom team results ==
All points were shown including individual deduction. bold indicate highest score - italics indicate race wins

Place	Country	Total points	1 (Germany)	3 (Switzerland)	7 (Austria)	8 (France)	10 (Italy)	14 (United States)	17 (United States)	Racers	Wins
1	France	350	37	61	48	**71**	**71**	31	31	9	5
2	Austria	171	32	33	17	18	10	21	40	6	2
3	United States	39	-	-	2	6	-	20	11	4	0
4	Sweden	32	-	-	23	-	9	-	-	4	0
5	Canada	28	-	1	-	-	-	23	4	3	0
6	Switzerland	25	16	-	-	-	-	-	9	2	0
7	Italy	19	8	-	6	-	5	-	-	2	0
8	West Germany	2	2	-	-	-	-	-	-	1	0

**Alpine Skiing World Cup**
**Men**

Overall | Downhill | Giant slalom | **Slalom**

**1967**
