= 1967 Alpine Skiing World Cup – Men's giant slalom =

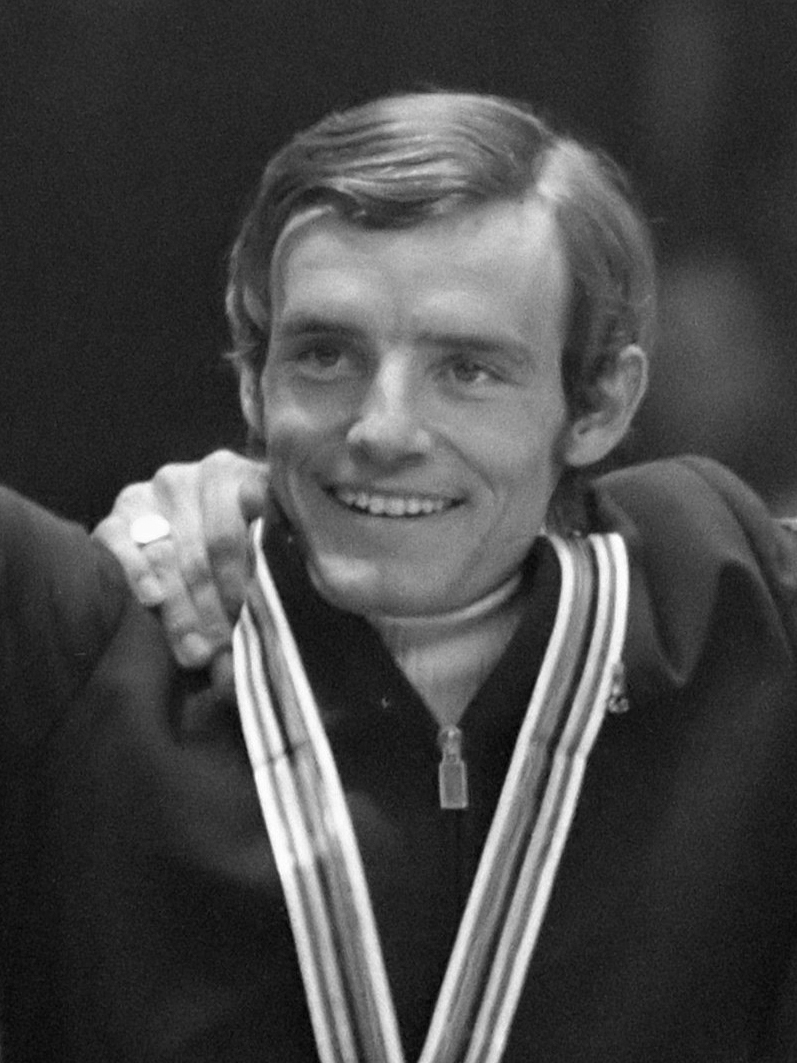
1967 Men's Giant Slalom Cup: Jean-Claude Killy, the title winner; 1967 Men's World Cup; Overall • Downhill; Giant slalom • Slalom
Previous: 1966	Next: 1968

The Men's Giant Slalom event at the 1967 Alpine Skiing World Cup involved 5 events. Jean-Claude Killy won the individual gold title, which France winning in the team results.

== Calendar ==
Round	Race No	Place	Country	Date	Winner	Second	Third
1	2	Berchtesgaden	West Germany	January 6, 1967	(France) Georges Mauduit	(France) Léo Lacroix	(France) Jean-Claude Killy
2	3	Adelboden	Switzerland	January 9, 1967	(France) Jean-Claude Killy	(Switzerland) Willy Favre	(France) Georges Mauduit
3	14	Franconia	United States	March 12, 1967	(France) Jean-Claude Killy	(France) Georges Mauduit	(Switzerland) Dumeng Giovanoli
4	15	Vail	United States	March 19, 1967	(France) Jean-Claude Killy	(United States) Jimmy Heuga	(Austria) Heinrich Messner
5	16	Jackson Hole	United States	March 25, 1967	(France) Jean-Claude Killy	(United States) Jimmy Heuga	(Austria) Werner Bleiner

== Standings ==
In men's giant slalom World Cup 1966/67 the best 3 results count. Deductions are given in ().

Place	Name	Country	Total points	Deduction	2 (Germany)	3 (Switzerland)	14 (United States)	15 (United States)	16 (United States)
1	Jean-Claude Killy	France	75	(40)	(15)	25	25	25	(25)
2	Georges Mauduit	France	60		25	15	20	-	-
3	Jimmy Heuga	United States	42		-	2	-	20	20
4	Léo Lacroix	France	39		20	11	-	8	-
5	Heinrich Messner	Austria	32	(7)	(3)	(4)	11	15	6
6	Werner Bleiner	Austria	27		-	8	4	-	15
7	Dumeng Giovanoli	Switzerland	23		-	-	15	-	8
8	Karl Schranz	Austria	21		4	-	6	11	-
9	Willy Favre	Switzerland	20		-	20	-	-	-
10	Scott Henderson	Canada	16		-	-	8	6	2
11	Herbert Huber	Austria	14		1	-	2	-	11
12	Guy Périllat	France	13	(1)	6	3	-	(1)	4
13	Stefan Kälin	Switzerland	11		11	-	-	-	-
14	Roger Rossat-Mignod	France	8		8	-	-	-	-
	Jakob Tischhauser	Switzerland	8		-	8	-	-	-
16	Rudi Sailer	Austria	4		-	-	-	4	-
	Robert Swan	Canada	4		-	-	1	3	-
18	Ivo Mahlknecht	Italy	3		-	-	3	-	-
	Gerhard Nenning	Austria	3		-	-	-	-	3
20	Edmund Bruggmann	Switzerland	2		2	-	-	-	-
	Rod Hebron	Canada	2		-	-	-	2	-
22	Bruno Piazzalunga	Italy	1		-	1	-	-	-
	Rick Chaffee	United States	1		-	-	-	-	1

== Team Results ==
All points were shown including individual deduction. bold indicate highest score - italics indicate race wins

Place	Country	Total points	2 (Germany)	3 (Switzerland)	14 (United States)	15 (United States)	16 (United States)	Racers	Wins
1	France	256	**74**	**74**	45	34	29	6	5
2	Austria	108	8	12	23	30	35	6	0
3	Switzerland	44	13	8	15	-	8	4	0
4	United States	43	-	2	-	20	21	2	0
5	Canada	22	-	-	9	11	2	3	0
6	Italy	4	-	1	3	-	-	2	0
