= Hahnenkamm Races =

Ski race

Hahnenkamm Races Hahnenkamm Renen
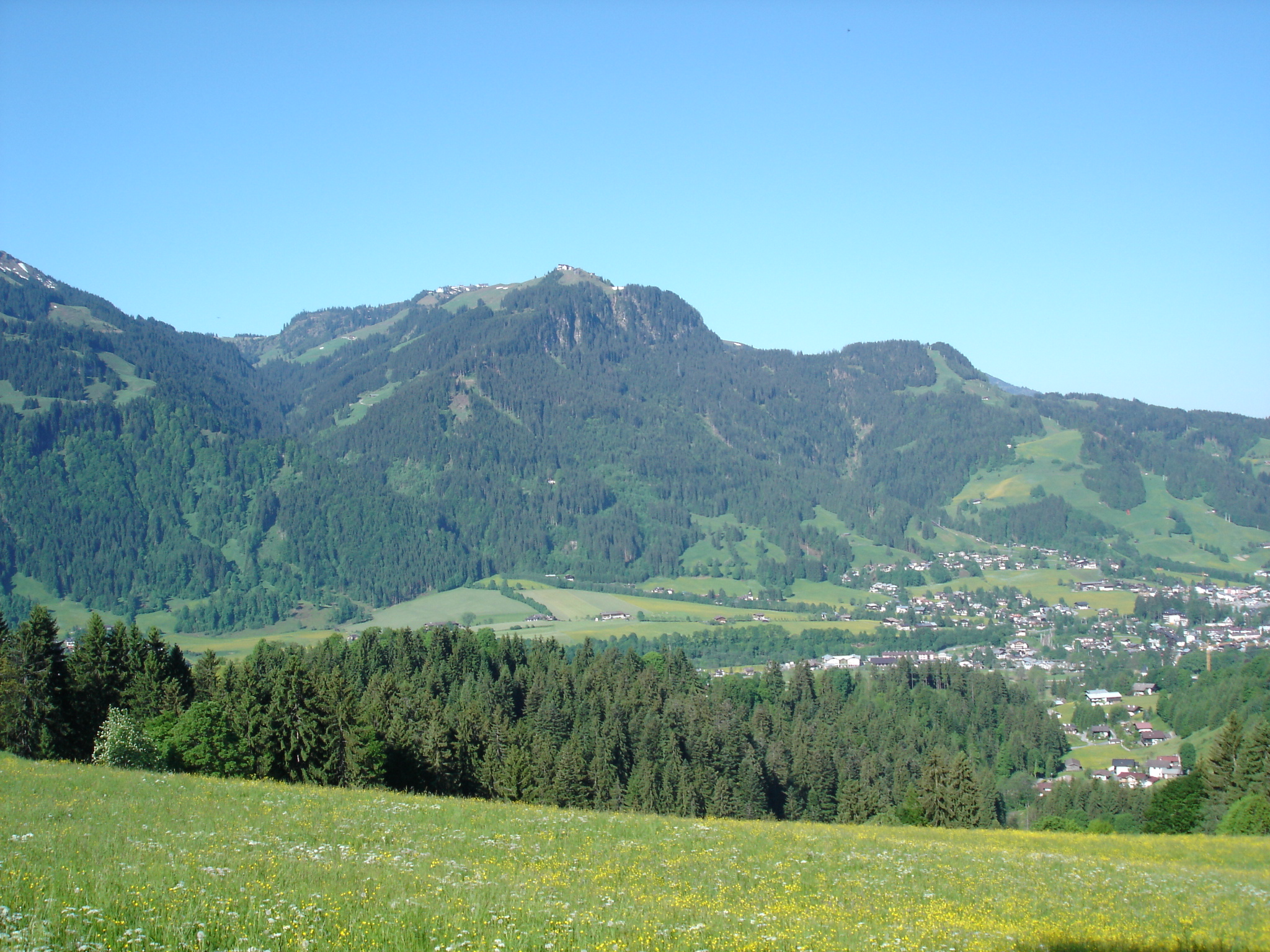
- Hahnenkamm mountain above Kitzbühel
- Status: Active
- Genre: FIS Alpine Ski World Cup
- Date: January
- Frequency: Annual
- Venue: Streif (DH), Streifalm (SG), Ganslernhang (SL)
- Locations: Kitzbühel, Austria (Hahnenkamm mountain)
- Inaugurated: 1931
- Organiser: International Ski Federation

The Hahnenkamm Race (German: Hahnenkamm Rennen or Rooster Comb Races) is one of the world's most prestigious FIS Alpine Ski World Cup races in Kitzbühel, Austria, held annually since 1931.

This is the world's second oldest alpine skiing competition after Lauberhorn, with the second most esteemed ski trophy after the Lauberhorn race.

In first six years, before the competition moved to the current location, it was held in five different slopes: Fleckalm, Stickelberg, Pengelstein, Ehrenbachhöhe and Hahnenkamm.

Since 1937, the competition has been held on Streif and Ganslernhang, both famous downhill and slalom slopes, next to each other on Hahnenkamm in Kitzbühel Alps.

The combined competition was ended in 2017. There are now three races, first the Kitzbühel Downhill on Friday followed by the traditional races on the weekend—Saturday's race the Hahnenkamm Downhill and Sunday's race the Hahnenkamm Slalom.

== List of winners ==
=== Hahnenkamm classic ===
Combined winner was also Hanhenkamm trophy champion.

Year	Downhill	Slalom	Combined	Notes
	Flecklam	Hahnenkamm	DH + SL best time	
1931	(Austria) Ferdl Friedensbacher	(Austria) Hans Mariacher	(United Kingdom) Gordon Cleaver	
	Stickelberg	Ehrenbachhöhe	DH + SL best time	
1932	(Switzerland) Walter Prager	(Austria) Hans Hauser	(Austria) Hans Hauser	
1933	planned, but not announced; due to political reasons			
1934	planned, but not announced; due to political reasons			
	Stickelberg	Hahnenkamm	DH + SL best time	
1935	(Austria) Siegfried Engl	(Austria) Siegfried Engl	(Austria) Siegfried Engl	
	Pengelstein	Ehrenbachhöhe	DH + SL best time	
1936	(Austria) Friedl Pfeifer	(Austria) Rudolph Matt	(Austria) Rudolph Matt	
	Streif	Ganslernhang	DH + SL best time	
1937	(Austria) Thaddäus Schwabl	(Austria) Wilhelm Walch	(Austria) Wilhelm Walch	moved to current slopes
1938	lack of snow			
1939	lack of snow			
1946	(Austria) Thaddäus Schwabl	(Czechoslovakia) Antonín Šponar	(Austria) Karl Koller	
1947	(Austria) Karl Feix	(Austria) Christian Pravda	(Austria) Christian Pravda	
1948	(Austria) Hellmut Lantschner	(Austria) Thaddäus Schwabl	(Austria) Hellmut Lantschner	
1949	(Austria) Egon Schöpf	(Austria) Egon Schöpf	(Austria) Egon Schöpf	
1950	(Austria) Fritz Huber	(West Germany) Sepp Folger	(Austria) Fritz Huber	
1951	(Austria) Christian Pravda	(Austria) Christian Pravda	(Austria) Christian Pravda	
FIS--A
1953	(Switzerland) Bernhard Perren	(Austria) Andreas Molterer	(Austria) Andreas Molterer	first FIS-A event (then highest level competition)
1954	(Austria) Christian Pravda	(Austria) Toni Spiss	(Austria) Christian Pravda	SL -- held on the Vorderganslern slope
1955	(Austria) Andreas Molterer	(Austria) Toni Spiss	(Austria) Andreas Molterer	
1956	(Austria) Toni Sailer	(Austria) Toni Sailer	(Austria) Toni Sailer	
1957	(Austria) Toni Sailer	(Austria) Josef Rieder	(Austria) Josef Rieder	
1958	(Austria) Andreas Molterer	(Austria) Andreas Molterer	(Austria) Andreas Molterer	
1959	(United States) Buddy Werner	(Austria) Andreas Molterer	(Austria) Andreas Molterer	ORF -- first live broadcast (four cameras)
1960	(France) Adrien Duvillard	(France) Adrien Duvillard	(France) Adrien Duvillard	
1961	(France) Guy Périllat	(Austria) Gerhard Nenning	(France) Guy Périllat	
1962	(Switzerland) Willi Forrer	(United States) Chuck Ferries	(Austria) Gerhard Nenning	
1963	(Austria) Egon Zimmermann	(West Germany) Ludwig Leitner	(Austria) Egon Zimmermann	
1964	lack of snow			
1965	(West Germany) Ludwig Leitner	(France) Jean-Claude Killy	(France) Jean-Claude Killy	
1966	(Austria) Karl Schranz	(France) Jean-Claude Killy	(Austria) Karl Schranz	
World Cup
1967	(France) Jean-Claude Killy	(France) Jean-Claude Killy	(France) Jean-Claude Killy	World Cup premiere
1968	(Austria) Gerhard Nenning	(Switzerland) Dumeng Giovanoli	(France) Jean-Claude Killy	
1969	(Austria) Karl Schranz	(France) Patrick Russel	(France) Guy Périllat	
1970	(Switzerland) Dumeng Giovanoli (GS)	(France) Patrick Russel	(France) Patrick Russel (GS+SL)	GS -- instead of downhill; the one time exception
1971	lack of snow	(France) Jean-Noël Augert	(France) Henri Duvillard	DH -- rescheduled to Mégève, counted for Combined
1972	(Austria) Karl Schranz	(France) Jean-Noël Augert	(France) Henri Duvillard	DH -- snow (Hausberg bypassed by Vorderganslern)
1973	(Switzerland) Roland Collombin	(France) Jean-Noël Augert	(United States) Bob Cochran	
1974	(Switzerland) Roland Collombin	(Austria) Hansi Hinterseer	(Italy) Gustav Thöni	
1975	(Austria) Franz Klammer	(Italy) Piero Gros	(Italy) Gustav Thöni	
1976	(Austria) Franz Klammer	(Sweden) Ingemar Stenmark	(Switzerland) Walter Tresch	snowfall -- switch (SL on Saturday, DH on Sunday)
1977	(Austria) Franz Klammer	(Sweden) Ingemar Stenmark	(Italy) Gustav Thöni	
1978	(Austria) Josef Walcher (West Germany) Sepp Ferstl	(Austria) Klaus Heidegger	(France) Patrice Pellat-Finet	High-safety A-Nets used for the first time
1979	(West Germany) Sepp Ferstl	(West Germany) Christian Neureuther	(Austria) Anton Steiner	ORF -- eight cameras used in broadcast the first time
1980	(Canada) Ken Read	(Liechtenstein) Andreas Wenzel	(Liechtenstein) Andreas Wenzel	
1981	(Canada) Steve Podborski	(Sweden) Ingemar Stenmark	(Czechoslovakia) Bohumír Zeman	
1982	(Canada) Steve Podborski	(Sweden) Ingemar Stenmark	(United States) Phil Mahre	SL -- first use of flex poles; DH -- first use of williy bags
1983	(Canada) Todd Brooker	(Sweden) Ingemar Stenmark	(United States) Phil Mahre	first use of artificial snowmaking machinery
1984	(Austria) Franz Klammer	(Luxembourg) Marc Girardelli	(Austria) Anton Steiner	ABC broadcast the DH race to the United States
1985	(Switzerland) Pirmin Zurbriggen	(Luxembourg) Marc Girardelli	(Liechtenstein) Andreas Wenzel	
1986	(Austria) Peter Wirnsberger	(Liechtenstein) Paul Frommelt	(Switzerland) Pirmin Zurbriggen	
1987	(Switzerland) Pirmin Zurbriggen	(Socialist Federal Republic of Yugoslavia) Bojan Križaj	(Switzerland) Pirmin Zurbriggen	
1988	lack of snow			
1989	(Switzerland) Daniel Mahrer	(West Germany) Armin Bittner	(Luxembourg) Marc Girardelli	
1990	(Norway) Atle Skårdal	(Austria) Rudolf Nierlich	(Switzerland) Pirmin Zurbriggen	DH -- snow, two runs (lower start: Alte Schneise); Hausberg, Zielschuss bypassed over Vorderganslern
1991	(Switzerland) Franz Heinzer	(Luxembourg) Marc Girardelli	(Luxembourg) Marc Girardelli	
1992	(Switzerland) Franz Heinzer	(Italy) Alberto Tomba	(Switzerland) Paul Accola	
1993	lack of snow			
1994	(Austria) Patrick Ortlieb	(Austria) Thomas Stangassinger	(Norway) Lasse Kjus	
1995	(France) Luc Alphand	(Italy) Alberto Tomba	(Luxembourg) Marc Girardelli	DH -- heavy snowfall (lower start: Steilhang)
1996	(Austria) Günther Mader	(Austria) Thomas Sykora	(Austria) Günther Mader	
1997	(Austria) Fritz Strobl	(Austria) Mario Reiter	(Norway) Lasse Kjus	DH -- Strobl set full course record at 1:51.58
1998	(Italy) Kristian Ghedina	(Austria) Thomas Stangassinger	(Norway) Kjetil André Aamodt	DH -- Hausberg bypassed over Vorderganslern; SL -- start: Vorderganslern, finish: Streif
1999	(Austria) Hans Knauß	(Slovenia) Jure Košir	(Norway) Kjetil André Aamodt	99,000 -- record attendance (DH record at 53,000)
2000	(Austria) Fritz Strobl	(Austria) Mario Matt	(Norway) Kjetil André Aamodt	DH -- heavy snow (lower start: Mausefalle_bottom)
2001	(Austria) Hermann Maier	(Austria) Benjamin Raich	(Norway) Lasse Kjus	
2002	(Austria) Stephan Eberharter	(Austria) Rainer Schönfelder	(Norway) Kjetil André Aamodt	
2003	(United States) Daron Rahlves	(Finland) Kalle Palander	(Austria) Michael Walchhofer	DH -- fog (lower start: Alte Schneise)
2004	(Austria) Stephan Eberharter	(Finland) Kalle Palander	(United States) Bode Miller	
2005	lack of snow	(Austria) Manfred Pranger	not awarded	
2006	(Austria) Michael Walchhofer	(France) Jean-Pierre Vidal	(Austria) Benjamin Raich	DH -- strong wind (lower start: Mausefalle_bottom)
2007	lack of snow	(Sweden) Jens Byggmark	not awarded	SL -- hurricane (start: Vorderganslern - finish: Streif)
2008	(Switzerland) Didier Cuche	(France) Jean-Baptiste Grange	(United States) Bode Miller	DH -- strong wind (lower start: Mausefalle_top); SL -- start: Vorderganslern, finish: Streif
2009	(Switzerland) Didier Défago	(France) Julien Lizeroux	(Switzerland) Silvan Zurbriggen	
2010	(Switzerland) Didier Cuche	(Germany) Felix Neureuther	(Croatia) Ivica Kostelić	
2011	(Switzerland) Didier Cuche	(France) Jean-Baptiste Grange	(Croatia) Ivica Kostelić	
2012	(Switzerland) Didier Cuche	(Italy) Cristian Deville	(Croatia) Ivica Kostelić	DH -- heavy snowfall (lower start: Alte Schneise)
2013	(Italy) Dominik Paris	(Austria) Marcel Hirscher	(Croatia) Ivica Kostelić	
2014	(Austria) Hannes Reichelt	(Germany) Felix Neureuther	(France) Alexis Pinturault	DH -- snow lack (Hausberg, Zielschuss bypassed)
2015	(Norway) Kjetil Jansrud	(Sweden) Mattias Hargin	(France) Alexis Pinturault	DH -- thick fog (lower start: Seidlalmsprung)
2016	(Italy) Peter Fill	(Norway) Henrik Kristoffersen	(France) Alexis Pinturault	DH -- wind, snow (lower start: Mausefalle_top)
2017	(Italy) Dominik Paris	(Austria) Marcel Hirscher	KB no more on the calendar; from now on they are all considered Hahnenkamm winners	
2018	(Germany) Thomas Dreßen	(Norway) Henrik Kristoffersen	KB no more on the calendar; from now on they are all considered Hahnenkamm winners	
2019	(Italy) Dominik Paris	(France) Clément Noël	KB no more on the calendar; from now on they are all considered Hahnenkamm winners	DH -- on Friday instead of Saturday (bad forecast)
2020	(Austria) Matthias Mayer	(Switzerland) Daniel Yule	KB no more on the calendar; from now on they are all considered Hahnenkamm winners	
2021	(Switzerland) Beat Feuz	COVID-19 pandemic	KB no more on the calendar; from now on they are all considered Hahnenkamm winners	DH -- on Sunday instead of Saturday (bad forecast)
2022	(Switzerland) Beat Feuz	(United Kingdom) David Ryding	KB no more on the calendar; from now on they are all considered Hahnenkamm winners	
2023	(Norway) Aleksander Aamodt Kilde	(Switzerland) Daniel Yule	KB no more on the calendar; from now on they are all considered Hahnenkamm winners	
2024	(France) Cyprien Sarrazin	(Germany) Linus Strasser	KB no more on the calendar; from now on they are all considered Hahnenkamm winners	
2025	(Canada) James Crawford	(France) Clément Noël	KB no more on the calendar; from now on they are all considered Hahnenkamm winners	
2026	(Italy) Giovanni Franzoni	(Austria) Manuel Feller	KB no more on the calendar; from now on they are all considered Hahnenkamm winners	

=== Other additional races ===
Regular, rescheduled or replaced races that didn't count for classic Hahnenkamm.

Year	Winner	Event	Notes
1932	(Austria) Rudolph Matt	3KB	3 combined disciplines; with ski jumping
1936	(Austria) Hans Hauser	4KB	4 combined disciplines
1937	(Austria) Hubert Hammerschmidt	4KB	4 combined disciplines
1948	(Austria) Edi Mall	DH	additional downhill race
1950	(Austria) Fritz Huber	DH	additional downhill race
1951	(Austria) Christian Pravda	DH	additional downhill race
1953	(France) Guy de Huertas	GS	
1954	(Austria) Toni Spiss	GS	
1958	(Austria) Toni Sailer	GS	
1960	(Austria) Karl Schranz	GS	
1965	(Switzerland) Willy Favre	GS	
1971	(France) Jean-Noël Augert	SL	additional slalom, counted only for FIS points
World Cup
1971	(Switzerland) Bernhard Russi	DH	race rescheduled to Megève, counted for combined
1972	(Austria) Karl Schranz	DH	additional race; replaced event from Val d'Isere
1978	(Austria) Josef Walcher	DH	additional race; replaced event from Heavenly Valley
1982	(Austria) Harti Weirather	DH	additional race; replaced event from Morzine
1983	(Switzerland) Bruno Kernen	DH	additional race; replaced event from Wengen
1985	(Switzerland) Pirmin Zurbriggen	DH	additional race; replaced event from Val d'Isere
1986	(Austria) Peter Wirnsberger	DH	additional race; replaced event from Ga-Pa
1989	(Luxembourg) Marc Girardelli	DH	additional race; replaced event from Las Leñas
1992	(Switzerland) Franz Heinzer	DH	additional race; replaced event from St. Anton
1995	(France) Luc Alphand	DH	additional race; replaced St. Anton (start: Steilhang)
1995	(Austria) Günther Mader	SG	additional race; replaced event from Bad Kleinkirchheim
1997	(France) Luc Alphand	DH	downhill sprint in two short runs (start: Alte Schneise)
1998	(Switzerland) Didier Cuche	DH	downhill sprint in two short runs (start: Alte Schneise); Hausberg, Zielschuss bypassed over Vorderganslern
1998	(Austria) Thomas Sykora	SL	additional race; replaced Madonna di Campiglio
1999	(Norway) Lasse Kjus	DH	downhill sprint in two short runs (start: Alte Schneise)
2000	(Austria) Hermann Maier	SG	in the calendar; regular super-G race
2001	(Austria) Hermann Maier	SG	in the calendar; regular super-G race
2002	(Austria) Stephan Eberharter	SG	in the calendar; regular super-G race
2003	(Austria) Hermann Maier	SG	in the calendar; regular (moved from Friday to Monday)
2004	(Norway) Lasse Kjus	DH	additional race; replaced event from Bormio
2004	(United States) Daron Rahlves	SG	in the calendar; regular super-G race
2005	(Austria) Hermann Maier	SG	in the calendar; regular (moved from Friday to Monday)
2006	(Austria) Hermann Maier	SG	in the calendar; regular super-G race
2007	(Sweden) Jens Byggmark	SL	additional race; replaced event from Wengen
2008	(Liechtenstein) Marco Büchel	SG	in the calendar; regular super-G race
2009	(Austria) Klaus Kröll	SG	in the calendar; regular super-G race
2010	(Switzerland) Didier Cuche	SG	in the calendar; regular super-G race
2011	(Croatia) Ivica Kostelić	SG	in the calendar; regular super-G race
2012	(Switzerland) Didier Cuche	SG	canceled due to rain; replaced in Crans-Montana
2013	(Norway) Aksel Lund Svindal	SG	in the calendar; regular super-G race
2014	(Switzerland) Didier Défago	SG	in the calendar; regular (Sunday, start: Seidlalm Sprung)
2015	(Italy) Dominik Paris	SG	in the calendar; regular super-G race
2016	(Norway) Aksel Lund Svindal	SG	in the calendar; regular super-G race
2017	(Austria) Matthias Mayer	SG	in the calendar; regular super-G race
2018	(Norway) Aksel Lund Svindal	SG	in the calendar; regular super-G race
2019	(Germany) Josef Ferstl	SG	in the calendar; regular (moved from Friday to Sunday)
2020	(Norway) Kjetil Jansrud	SG	in the calendar; regular super-G race
2021	(Switzerland) Beat Feuz	DH	additional race; replaced event from Wengen
2021	(Austria) Vincent Kriechmayr	SG	in the calendar; regular (moved from Sunday to Monday)
2022	(Norway) Aleksander Aamodt Kilde	DH	in the calendar; regular; on Friday
2023	(Austria) Vincent Kriechmayr	DH	in the calendar; regular; on Friday
2024	(France) Cyprien Sarrazin	DH	in the calendar; regular; on Friday
