= Downhill (ski competition) =

Alpine skiing competition

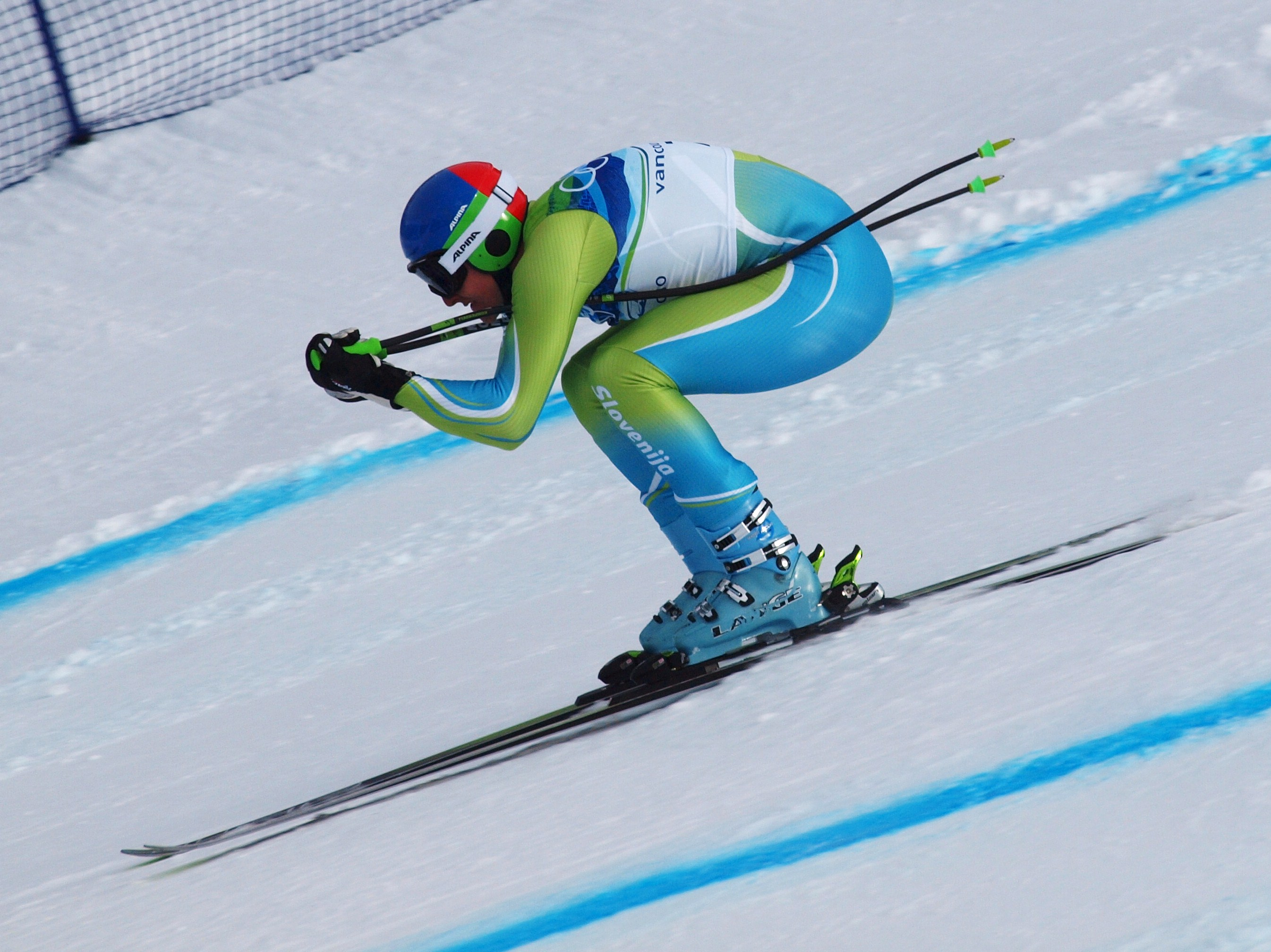
Slovenia's Andrej Šporn at the 2010 Winter Olympics downhill in a typical downhill body position

Downhill is a form of alpine skiing competition. Whereas the other alpine skiing events (slalom, giant slalom, super giant slalom, and combined) emphasize turning and technique, downhill emphasizes "the six components of technique, courage, speed, risk, physical condition and judgement", according to the FIS "International Ski Competition Rules (ICR)". Speeds of up to 130 km/h (81 mph) are common in international competition. Athletes must have an aerodynamically efficient tuck position to minimize drag and increase speed.

The term, "downhill skiing", is also used as a synonym for alpine skiing as a recreational activity.

== History ==
The rules for downhill skiing competitions were originally developed by Sir Arnold Lunn for the 1925 British National Ski Championships. A speed of 100 miles per hour (161 km/h) was first achieved by Johan Clarey at the 2013 Lauberhorn World Cup, beating the previous record of 98 mph (158 km/h), set by Italian Stefan Thanei in 2005.

== Course ==
The FIS has rules for downhill courses that encompass their general characteristics, width, safety precautions, vertical drop, course length, style and placement of gates.

- General characteristics – As a test of "technique, courage, speed, risk, physical condition and judgement", the course requires the athlete to adapt to the technically demanding terrain and layout of gates.
- Width – Courses are typically 30 metres (100 ft) wide with allowances for the approaches to "lips, drop-offs and jumps".
- Safety – Obstacles on courses are expected to be protected with nets, fences, or pads.
- Vertical drop – Vertical drop ranges from 450 to 1,100 metres (1,480 to 3,610 ft) for men and 450 to 800 metres (1,480 to 2,620 ft) for women. Races with two runs may be shorter.
- Course length – Courses require an accurate means of measurement for length.
- Gates – Gates consist of pairs of twin poles with a rectangular panel between the poles. Gates have an 8-metre (26 ft) or larger opening.

== Equipment ==
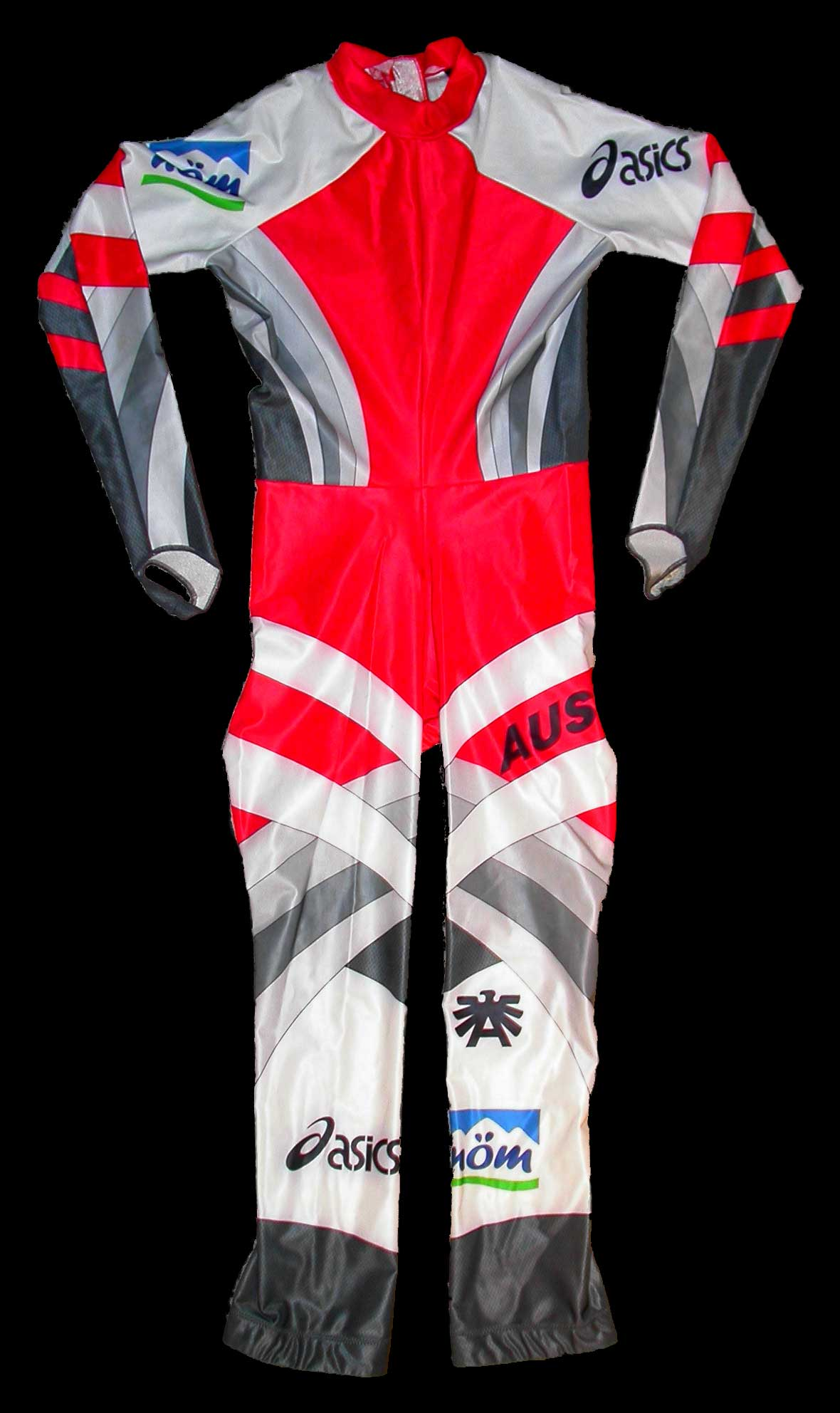
Austrian Downhill racing suit

Equipment for the downhill is different from the alpine events that are lower-speed. Skis are 30% longer than those used in slalom, for more stability at high speed. They usually have rounded, low-profile tips rather than pointed tips. Ski poles are bent so as to curve around the body as the racer stays in a "tuck position" and may have aerodynamic, cone-shaped baskets. As in other alpine disciplines, downhill racers wear skin-tight suits to minimize drag, and helmets are mandatory.

In an attempt to increase safety, the 2003–2004 season saw the FIS increase the minimum sidecut radius for downhill skis to 45 metres (148 ft) from 40 metres (131 ft), and impose minimum ski lengths for the first time: 218 cm (7 ft 2 in) for men, and 210 cm (6 ft 11 in) for women. For the 2024–2025 season, the FIS began mandating the use of an airbag device, which inflates automatically when a skier crashes, for all athletes competing in speed disciplines at the world cup level.

== Races ==
In all forms of downhill, both at a local youth-level as well as the higher FIS international level, racers are allowed extensive preparation for the race, which includes daily course inspection and discussion with their coaches and teammates as well as several practice runs before the actual race. Racers do not make any unnecessary turns while on the course, and try to do everything they can to maintain the most aerodynamic position while negotiating turns and jumps.

Unlike slalom and giant slalom, where racers have the times of two runs combined, the downhill race is a single run. Times are typically between 1½ and 2½ minutes for World Cup courses and must be over 1 minute in duration to meet international minimum standards. Tenths and hundredths and, occasionally, thousandths of seconds count: World Cup races and Olympic medals have sometimes been decided by as little as one or two hundredths of a second, and ties are not unheard of.

The most successful all-time winners of World Cup downhill races are Annemarie Moser-Pröll of Austria (36 wins, 7 women's titles) and Franz Klammer of Austria (25 wins, 5 men's titles). Lindsey Vonn of the U.S. is currently dominant in woman's downhill racing with a lifetime total of 37 World Cup downhill wins and 7 women's titles.

== Risks ==
On some courses, such as the Lauberhorn course in Wengen, Switzerland, and the Hahnenkamm course in Kitzbühel, Austria, speeds of up to 150 km/h (93 mph) are common. Safety netting and padding are placed where race officials anticipate potential crashes. Despite these safety precautions, the ski racing community is well aware of the inherent risks of downhill skiing, for it is possible for racers to suffer serious injury or death while practising or competing. Three deaths among World Cup racers in the past 40 years in downhill training or during a race were those of Austrians Gernot Reinstadler (1991) and Ulrike Maier (1994), and Frenchman Régine Cavagnoud (2001). Also in 2001, Swiss downhiller Silvano Beltrametti was paralyzed in a high-speed crash and 1984 Olympic gold medalist Bill Johnson suffered permanent brain damage that eventually led to a crippling stroke which left him unable to function without assistance. Most recently Frenchman David Poisson was killed in a training crash in 2017. Speaking to media after Poisson's death, French former downhiller Luc Alphand noted that "eliminating risk entirely in downhill is impossible".

== Men's World Cup podiums ==
In the following table men's downhill World Cup podium results in the World Cup since the first season in 1967. Winners receive a distinctive crystal globe.

Season	1st	2nd	3rd
1967	(France) Jean-Claude Killy	(France) Guy Périllat	(Germany) Franz Vogler
1968	(Austria) Gerhard Nenning	(France) Jean-Claude Killy	(Austria) Karl Schranz
1969	(Austria) Karl Schranz	(France) Henri Duvillard	(Austria) Heinrich Messner
1970	(Austria) Karl Cordin	(Austria) Karl Schranz	(France) Henri Duvillard
1971	(Switzerland) Bernhard Russi	(France) Bernard Orcel	(Austria) Karl Cordin
1972	(Switzerland) Bernhard Russi	(Austria) Karl Schranz	(United States) Mike Lafferty
1973	(Switzerland) Roland Collombin	(Switzerland) Bernhard Russi	(Italy) Marcello Varallo
1974	(Switzerland) Roland Collombin	(Austria) Franz Klammer	(Italy) Herbert Plank
1975	(Austria) Franz Klammer	(Austria) Werner Grissmann	(Italy) Herbert Plank
1976	(Austria) Franz Klammer	(Italy) Herbert Plank	(Switzerland) Bernhard Russi
1977	(Austria) Franz Klammer	(Austria) Josef Walcher	(Switzerland) Bernhard Russi
1978	(Austria) Franz Klammer	(Austria) Josef Walcher	(Italy) Herbert Plank
1979	(Switzerland) Peter Müller	(Austria) Peter Wirnsberger	(Switzerland) Toni Bürgler
1980	(Switzerland) Peter Müller	(Canada) Ken Read	(Italy) Herbert Plank
1981	(Austria) Harti Weirather	(Canada) Steve Podborski	(Switzerland) Peter Müller
1982	(Canada) Steve Podborski	(Switzerland) Peter Müller	(Austria) Harti Weirather
1983	(Austria) Franz Klammer	(Switzerland) Conradin Cathomen	(Austria) Harti Weirather
1984	(Switzerland) Urs Räber	(Austria) Erwin Resch	(United States) Bill Johnson
1985	(Austria) Helmut Höflehner	(Switzerland) Peter Müller	(Switzerland) Karl Alpiger
1986	(Austria) Peter Wirnsberger	(Switzerland) Peter Müller	(Italy) Michael Mair
1987	(Switzerland) Pirmin Zurbriggen	(Switzerland) Peter Müller	(Switzerland) Franz Heinzer
1988	(Switzerland) Pirmin Zurbriggen	(Italy) Michael Mair	(Canada) Rob Boyd
1989	(Luxembourg) Marc Girardelli	(Austria) Helmut Höflehner	(Switzerland) Daniel Mahrer
1990	(Austria) Helmut Höflehner	(Norway) Atle Skårdal	(Switzerland) Pirmin Zurbriggen
1991	(Switzerland) Franz Heinzer	(Norway) Atle Skårdal	(Switzerland) Daniel Mahrer
1992	(Switzerland) Franz Heinzer	(Switzerland) Daniel Mahrer	(United States) A.J. Kitt
1993	(Switzerland) Franz Heinzer	(Norway) Atle Skårdal	(Switzerland) William Besse
1994	(Luxembourg) Marc Girardelli	(Austria) Hannes Trinkl	(Austria) Patrick Ortlieb
1995	(France) Luc Alphand	(Italy) Kristian Ghedina	(Austria) Patrick Ortlieb
1996	(France) Luc Alphand	(Austria) Guenther Mader	(Austria) Patrick Ortlieb
1997	(France) Luc Alphand	(Italy) Kristian Ghedina	(Austria) Fritz Strobl
1998	(Austria) Andreas Schifferer	(Austria) Hermann Maier	(France) Nicolas Burtin
1999	(Norway) Lasse Kjus	(Austria) Andreas Schifferer	(Austria) Werner Franz
2000	(Austria) Hermann Maier	(Italy) Kristian Ghedina	(Austria) Josef Strobl
2001	(Austria) Hermann Maier	(Austria) Stephan Eberharter	(Austria) Fritz Strobl
2002	(Austria) Stephan Eberharter	(Austria) Fritz Strobl	(Italy) Kristian Ghedina
2003	(Austria) Stephan Eberharter	(United States) Daron Rahlves	(Austria) Michael Walchhofer
2004	(Austria) Stephan Eberharter	(United States) Daron Rahlves	(Austria) Hermann Maier
2005	(Austria) Michael Walchhofer	(United States) Bode Miller	(Austria) Hermann Maier
2006	(Austria) Michael Walchhofer	(Austria) Fritz Strobl	(United States) Daron Rahlves
2007	(Switzerland) Didier Cuche	(Liechtenstein) Marco Büchel	(Canada) Erik Guay
2008	(Switzerland) Didier Cuche	(United States) Bode Miller	(Austria) Michael Walchhofer
2009	(Austria) Michael Walchhofer	(Austria) Klaus Kröll	(Switzerland) Didier Défago
2010	(Switzerland) Didier Cuche	(Switzerland) Carlo Janka	(Italy) Werner Heel
2011	(Switzerland) Didier Cuche	(Austria) Michael Walchhofer	(Austria) Klaus Kröll
2012	(Austria) Klaus Kröll	(Switzerland) Beat Feuz	(Switzerland) Didier Cuche
2013	(Norway) Aksel Lund Svindal	(Austria) Klaus Kröll	(Italy) Dominik Paris
2014	(Norway) Aksel Lund Svindal	(Austria) Hannes Reichelt	(Canada) Erik Guay
2015	(Norway) Kjetil Jansrud	(Austria) Hannes Reichelt	(France) Guillermo Fayed
2016	(Italy) Peter Fill	(Norway) Aksel Lund Svindal	(Italy) Dominik Paris
2017	(Italy) Peter Fill	(Norway) Kjetil Jansrud	(Italy) Dominik Paris
2018	(Switzerland) Beat Feuz	(Norway) Aksel Lund Svindal	(Germany) Thomas Dreßen
2019	(Switzerland) Beat Feuz	(Italy) Dominik Paris	(Austria) Vincent Kriechmayr
2020	(Switzerland) Beat Feuz	(Germany) Thomas Dreßen	(Austria) Matthias Mayer
2021	(Switzerland) Beat Feuz	(Austria) Matthias Mayer	(Italy) Dominik Paris
2022	(Norway) Aleksander Aamodt Kilde	(Switzerland) Beat Feuz	(Italy) Dominik Paris
2023	(Norway) Aleksander Aamodt Kilde	(Austria) Vincent Kriechmayr	(Switzerland) Marco Odermatt
2024	(Switzerland) Marco Odermatt	(France) Cyprien Sarrazin	(Italy) Dominik Paris

== Women's World Cup podiums ==
In the following table women's downhill World Cup podium results in the World Cup since the first season in 1967. Winners receive a distinctive crystal globe.

Season	1st	2nd	3rd
1967	(France) Marielle Goitschel	(France) Isabelle Mir	(Italy) Giustina Demetz
1968	(France) Isabelle Mir (Austria) Olga Pall		(Austria) Christl Haas
1969	(Austria) Wiltrud Drexel	(France) Isabelle Mir	(Austria) Olga Pall
1970	(France) Isabelle Mir	(France) Annie Famose	(France) Florence Steurer
1971	(Austria) Annemarie Moser-Pröll	(Austria) Wiltrud Drexel	(France) Françoise Macchi
1972	(Austria) Annemarie Moser-Pröll	(Austria) Wiltrud Drexel	(Switzerland) Marie-Thérèse Nadig
1973	(Austria) Annemarie Moser-Pröll	(Austria) Wiltrud Drexel	(France) Jacqueline Rouvier
1974	(Austria) Annemarie Moser-Pröll	(Switzerland) Marie-Thérèse Nadig	(Austria) Wiltrud Drexel
1975	(Austria) Annemarie Moser-Pröll	(Switzerland) Bernadette Zurbriggen	(Switzerland) Marie-Thérèse Nadig
1976	(Austria) Brigitte Totschnig	(Switzerland) Bernadette Zurbriggen	(Austria) Nicola Spieß
1977	(Austria) Brigitte Totschnig	(Austria) Annemarie Moser-Pröll	(Switzerland) Marie-Thérèse Nadig
1978	(Austria) Annemarie Moser-Pröll	(United States) Cindy Nelson	(Switzerland) Marie-Thérèse Nadig
1979	(Austria) Annemarie Moser-Pröll	(Switzerland) Bernadette Zurbriggen	(Switzerland) Marie-Thérèse Nadig
1980	(Switzerland) Marie-Thérèse Nadig	(Austria) Annemarie Moser-Pröll	(Liechtenstein) Hanni Wenzel
1981	(Switzerland) Marie-Thérèse Nadig	(Switzerland) Doris De Agostini	(Austria) Cornelia Pröll
1982	(France) Marie-Cécile Gros-Gaudenier	(Switzerland) Doris De Agostini (United States) Holly Flanders	
1983	(Switzerland) Doris De Agostini	(Switzerland) Maria Walliser	(Austria) Elisabeth Kirchler
1984	(Switzerland) Maria Walliser	(Germany) Irene Epple	(Liechtenstein) Hanni Wenzel
1985	(Switzerland) Michela Figini	(Switzerland) Maria Walliser	(Switzerland) Brigitte Oertli
1986	(Switzerland) Maria Walliser	(Austria) Katrin Gutensohn	(Canada) Laurie Graham
1987	(Switzerland) Michela Figini	(Switzerland) Maria Walliser	(Canada) Laurie Graham
1988	(Switzerland) Michela Figini	(Switzerland) Brigitte Oertli	(Switzerland) Maria Walliser
1989	(Switzerland) Michela Figini	(Switzerland) Maria Walliser	(Germany) Michaela Gerg
1990	(Germany) Katrin Gutensohn	(Austria) Petra Kronberger	(Switzerland) Michela Figini (Germany) Michaela Gerg
1991	(Switzerland) Chantal Bournissen	(Austria) Sabine Ginther	(Austria) Petra Kronberger
1992	(Germany) Katja Seizinger	(Austria) Petra Kronberger	(Germany) Miriam Vogt
1993	(Germany) Katja Seizinger	(Germany) Regina Häusl	(Canada) Kerrin Lee-Gartner
1994	(Germany) Katja Seizinger	(Canada) Kate Pace	(France) Mélanie Suchet
1995	(United States) Picabo Street	(United States) Hilary Lindh	(Germany) Katja Seizinger
1996	(United States) Picabo Street	(Germany) Katja Seizinger	(Italy) Isolde Kostner (Switzerland) Heidi Zurbriggen
1997	(Austria) Renate Götschl	(Switzerland) Heidi Zurbriggen	(Russia) Varvara Zelenskaya
1998	(Germany) Katja Seizinger	(Austria) Renate Götschl	(Italy) Isolde Kostner
1999	(Austria) Renate Götschl	(Austria) Alexandra Meissnitzer	(Austria) Michaela Dorfmeister
2000	(Germany) Regina Häusl	(Austria) Renate Götschl	(Italy) Isolde Kostner
2001	(Italy) Isolde Kostner	(Austria) Renate Götschl	(France) Régine Cavagnoud
2002	(Italy) Isolde Kostner	(Austria) Michaela Dorfmeister	(Switzerland) Corinne Rey-Bellet
2003	(Austria) Michaela Dorfmeister	(Austria) Renate Götschl	(United States) Kirsten Clark
2004	(Austria) Renate Götschl	(Germany) Hilde Gerg	(France) Carole Montillet
2005	(Austria) Renate Götschl	(Germany) Hilde Gerg	(Austria) Michaela Dorfmeister
2006	(Austria) Michaela Dorfmeister	(United States) Lindsey Kildow	(Austria) Renate Götschl
2007	(Austria) Renate Götschl	(United States) Julia Mancuso	(United States) Lindsey Kildow
2008	(United States) Lindsey Vonn	(Austria) Renate Götschl	(Canada) Britt Janyk
2009	(United States) Lindsey Vonn	(Austria) Andrea Fischbacher	(Germany) Maria Riesch
2010	(United States) Lindsey Vonn	(Germany) Maria Riesch	(Sweden) Anja Pärson
2011	(United States) Lindsey Vonn	(Germany) Maria Riesch	(United States) Julia Mancuso
2012	(United States) Lindsey Vonn	(Liechtenstein) Tina Weirather	(Austria) Elisabeth Görgl
2013	(United States) Lindsey Vonn	(Slovenia) Tina Maze	(Germany) Maria Höfl-Riesch
2014	(Germany) Maria Höfl-Riesch	(Austria) Anna Fenninger	(Slovenia) Tina Maze
2015	(United States) Lindsey Vonn	(Austria) Anna Fenninger	(Slovenia) Tina Maze
2016	(United States) Lindsey Vonn	(Switzerland) Fabienne Suter	(Canada) Larisa Yurkiw
2017	(Slovenia) Ilka Stuhec	(Italy) Sofia Goggia	(Switzerland) Lara Gut
2018	(Italy) Sofia Goggia	(United States) Lindsey Vonn	(Liechtenstein) Tina Weirather
2019	(Austria) Nicole Schmidhofer	(Austria) Stephanie Venier	(Austria) Ramona Siebenhofer
2020	(Switzerland) Corinne Suter	(Czech Republic) Ester Ledecka	(Italy) Federica Brignone
2021	(Italy) Sofia Goggia	(Switzerland) Corinne Suter	(Switzerland) Lara Gut-Behrami
2022	(Italy) Sofia Goggia	(Switzerland) Corinne Suter	(Czech Republic) Ester Ledecká
2023	(Italy) Sofia Goggia	(Slovenia) Ilka Stuhec	(Switzerland) Corinne Suter
2024	(Austria) Cornelia Hütter	(Switzerland) Lara Gut-Behrami	(Italy) Sofia Goggia

== Downhill at the "big competitions" ==
=== Medal table ===
Country	Gold	Silver	Bronze	All	Host nation
Austria	28	12	26	66	7 (2 x WOG, 5 x WCH)
Switzerland	18	21	14	53	4 (4 x WCH)
France	8	9	6	23	3 (2 x WOG, 1 x WCH)
United States	7	9	10	26	6 (3 x WOG, 3 x WCH)
Germany	6	6	7	19	2 (2 x WCH)
Canada	7	4	5	16	2 (2 x WOG)
Norway	4	12	2	18	1 (1 x WOG)
Slovenia	4	0	0	4	0
Italy	1	8	6	15	6 (2 x WOG, 5 x WCH)
Sweden	1	1	3	5	2 (2 x WCH)
(Croatia) Croatia	1	0	0	1	0
(Liechtenstein) Liechtenstein	0	1	1	2	0
(Australia) Australia	0	0	1	1	0
(Czech Republic) Czechoslovakia	0	0	1	1	0
(Soviet Union) USSR	0	0	1	1	0

=== Medalists ===
Year	Competition	Venue	Champions		2nd Place		3rd Place	
2022	Winter Olympic Games	(China) Beijing	(Switzerland) Beat Feuz	(Switzerland) Corinne Suter	(France) Johan Clarey	(Italy) Sofia Goggia	(Austria) Matthias Mayer	(Italy) Nadia Delago
2021	FIS Alpine World Ski Championships	(Italy) Cortina d'Ampezzo	(Austria) Vincent Kriechmayr	(Switzerland) Corinne Suter	(Germany) Andreas Sander	(Germany) Kira Weidle	(Switzerland) Beat Feuz	(Switzerland) Lara Gut-Behrami
2019	FIS Alpine World Ski Championships	(Sweden) Åre	(Norway) Kjetil Jansrud	(Slovenia) Ilka Štuhec	(Norway) Aksel Lund Svindal	(Switzerland) Corinne Suter	(Austria) Vincent Kriechmayr	(United States) Lindsey Vonn
2018	Winter Olympic Games	(South Korea) Pyeongchang	(Norway) Aksel Lund Svindal	(Italy) Sofia Goggia	(Norway) Kjetil Jansrud	(Norway) Ragnhild Mowinckel	(Switzerland) Beat Feuz	(United States) Lindsey Vonn
2017	FIS Alpine World Ski Championships	(Switzerland) St. Moritz	(Switzerland) Beat Feuz	(Slovenia) Ilka Štuhec	(Canada) Erik Guay	(Austria) Stephanie Venier	(Austria) Max Franz	(United States) Lindsey Vonn
2015	FIS Alpine World Ski Championships	(United States) Beaver Creek and Vail	(Switzerland) Patrick Küng	(Slovenia) Tina Maze	(United States) Travis Ganong	(Austria) Anna Fenninger	(Switzerland) Beat Feuz	(Switzerland) Lara Gut
2014	Winter Olympic Games	(Russia) Sochi	(Austria) Matthias Mayer	(Slovenia) Tina Maze	(Italy) Christof Innerhofer	not awarded	(Norway) Kjetil Jansrud	(Switzerland) Lara Gut
2014	Winter Olympic Games	(Russia) Sochi	(Austria) Matthias Mayer	(Switzerland) Dominique Gisin	(Italy) Christof Innerhofer	not awarded	(Norway) Kjetil Jansrud	(Switzerland) Lara Gut
2013	FIS Alpine World Ski Championships	(Austria) Schladming	(Norway) Aksel Lund Svindal	(France) Marion Rolland	(Italy) Dominik Paris	(Italy) Nadia Fanchini	(France) David Poisson	(Germany) Maria Höfl-Riesch
2011	FIS Alpine World Ski Championships	(Germany) Garmisch-Partenkirchen	(Canada) Erik Guay	(Austria) Elisabeth Görgl	(Switzerland) Didier Cuche	(United States) Lindsey Vonn	(Italy) Christof Innerhofer	(Germany) Maria Riesch
2010	Winter Olympic Games	(Canada) Vancouver	(Switzerland) Didier Defago	(United States) Lindsey Vonn	(Norway) Aksel Lund Svindal	(United States) Julia Mancuso	(United States) Bode Miller	(Austria) Elisabeth Görgl
2009	FIS Alpine World Ski Championships	(France) Val d'Isere	(Canada) John Kucera	(United States) Lindsey Vonn	(Switzerland) Didier Cuche	(Switzerland) Lara Gut	(Switzerland) Carlo Janka	(Italy) Nadia Fanchini
2007	FIS Alpine World Ski Championships	(Sweden) Åre	(Norway) Aksel Lund Svindal	(Sweden) Anja Pärson	(Canada) Jan Hudec	(United States) Lindsey C. Kildow	(Sweden) Patrik Järbyn	(Austria) Nicole Hosp
2006	Winter Olympic Games	(Italy) Torino	(France) Antoine Dénériaz	(Austria) Michaela Dorfmeister	(Austria) Michael Walchhofer	(Switzerland) Martina Schild	(Switzerland) Bruno Kernen	(Sweden) Anja Pärson
2005	FIS Alpine World Ski Championships	(Italy) Bormio	(United States) Bode Miller	(Croatia) Janica Kostelić	(United States) Daron Rahlves	(Italy) Elena Fanchini	(Austria) Michael Walchhofer	(Austria) Renate Götschl
2003	FIS Alpine World Ski Championships	(Switzerland) St. Moritz	(Austria) Michael Walchhofer	(Canada) Mélanie Turgeon	(Norway) Kjetil André Aamodt	(Switzerland) Corinne Rey-Bellet	(Switzerland) Bruno Kernen	(Austria) Alexandra Meissnitzer
2002	Winter Olympic Games	(United States) Salt Lake City	(Austria) Fritz Strobl	(France) Carole Montillet	(Norway) Lasse Kjus	(Italy) Isolde Kostner	(Austria) Stephan Eberharter	(Austria) Renate Götschl
2001	FIS Alpine World Ski Championships	(Austria) St. Anton	(Austria) Hannes Trinkl	(Austria) Michaela Dorfmeister	(Austria) Hermann Maier	(Austria) Renate Götschl	(Germany) Florian Eckert	(Austria) Selina Heregger
1999	FIS Alpine World Ski Championships	(United States) Beaver Creek and Vail	(Austria) Hermann Maier	(Austria) Renate Götschl	(Norway) Lasse Kjus	(Austria) Michaela Dorfmeister	(Norway) Kjetil André Aamodt	(Austria) Stefanie Schuster
1998	Winter Olympic Games	(Japan) Nagano	(France) Jean-Luc Crétier	(Germany) Katja Seizinger	(Norway) Lasse Kjus	(Sweden) Pernilla Wiberg	(Austria) Hannes Trinkl	(France) Florence Masnada
1997	FIS Alpine World Ski Championships	(Italy) Sestriere	(Switzerland) Bruno Kernen	(United States) Hilary Lindh	(Norway) Lasse Kjus	(Switzerland) Heidi Zurbriggen	(Italy) Kristian Ghedina	(Sweden) Pernilla Wiberg
1996	FIS Alpine World Ski Championships	(Spain) Sierra Nevada	(Austria) Patrick Ortlieb	(United States) Picabo Street	(Italy) Kristian Ghedina	(Germany) Katja Seizinger	(France) Luc Alphand	(United States) Hilary Lindh
1994	Winter Olympic Games	(Norway) Lillehammer	(United States) Tommy Moe	(Germany) Katja Seizinger	(Norway) Kjetil André Aamodt	(United States) Picabo Street	(Canada) Ed Podivinsky	(Italy) Isolde Kostner
1993	FIS Alpine World Ski Championships	(Japan) Morioka	(Switzerland) Urs Lehmann	(Canada) Kate Pace	(Norway) Atle Skårdal	(Norway) Astrid Lødemel	(United States) A.J. Kitt	(Austria) Anja Haas
1992	Winter Olympic Games	(France) Albertville	(Austria) Patrick Ortlieb	(Canada) Kerrin Lee-Gartner	(France) Franck Piccard	(United States) Hilary Lindh	(Austria) Günther Mader	(Austria) Veronika Wallinger
1991	FIS Alpine World Ski Championships	(Austria) Saalbach-Hinterglemm	(Switzerland) Franz Heinzer	(Austria) Petra Kronberger	(Italy) Peter Runggaldier	(France) Nathalie Bouvier	(Switzerland) Daniel Mahrer	(Soviet Union) Svetlana Gladisheva
1989	FIS Alpine World Ski Championships	(United States) Vail	(Germany) Hans-Jörg Tauscher	(Switzerland) Maria Walliser	(Switzerland) Peter Müller	(Canada) Karen Percy	(Switzerland) Karl Alpiger	(Germany) Karin Dedler
1988	Winter Olympic Games	(Canada) Calgary	(Switzerland) Pirmin Zurbriggen	(Germany) Marina Kiehl	(Switzerland) Peter Müller	(Switzerland) Brigitte Oertli	(France) Franck Piccard	(Canada) Karen Percy
1987	FIS Alpine World Ski Championships	(Switzerland) Crans-Montana	(Switzerland) Peter Müller	(Switzerland) Maria Walliser	(Switzerland) Pirmin Zurbriggen	(Switzerland) Michela Figini	(Switzerland) Karl Alpiger	(Germany) Regine Mösenlechner
1985	FIS Alpine World Ski Championships	(Italy) Bormio	(Switzerland) Pirmin Zurbriggen	(Switzerland) Michela Figini	(Switzerland) Peter Müller	(Switzerland) Ariane Ehrat	(United States) Doug Lewis	(Austria) Katharina Gutensohn
1984	Winter Olympic Games	(Socialist Federal Republic of Yugoslavia) Sarajevo	(United States) Bill Johnson	(Switzerland) Michela Figini	(Switzerland) Peter Müller	(Switzerland) Maria Walliser	(Austria) Anton Steiner	(Czech Republic) Olga Charvátová
1982	FIS Alpine World Ski Championships	(Austria) Schladming	(Austria) Harti Weirather	(Canada) Gerry Sorensen	(Switzerland) Conradin Cathomen	(United States) Cindy Nelson	(Austria) Erwin Resch	(Canada) Laurie Graham
1980	Winter Olympic Games *	(United States) Lake Placid	(Austria) Leonhard Stock	(Austria) Annemarie Moser-Pröll	(Austria) Peter Wirnsberger	(Liechtenstein) Hanni Wenzel	(Canada) Steve Podborski	(Switzerland) Marie-Theres Nadig
1978	FIS Alpine World Ski Championships	(Germany) Garmisch-Partenkirchen	(Austria) Josef Walcher	(Austria) Annemarie Moser-Pröll	(Germany) Michael Veith	(Germany) Irene Epple	(Austria) Werner Grissmann	(Switzerland) Doris de Agostini
1976	Winter Olympic Games *	(Austria) Innsbruck	(Austria) Franz Klammer	(Germany) Rosi Mittermaier	(Switzerland) Bernhard Russi	(Austria) Brigitte Totschnig	(Italy) Herbert Plank	(United States) Cindy Nelson
1974	FIS Alpine World Ski Championships	(Switzerland) St. Moritz	(Austria) David Zwilling	(Austria) Annemarie Pröll	(Austria) Franz Klammer	(Canada) Betsy Clifford	(Liechtenstein) Willi Frommelt	(Austria) Wiltrud Drexel
1972	Winter Olympic Games *	(Japan) Sapporo	(Switzerland) Bernhard Russi	(Switzerland) Marie-Theres Nadig	(Switzerland) Roland Collombin	(Austria) Annemarie Pröll	(Austria) Heini Messner	(United States) Susan Corrock
1970	FIS Alpine World Ski Championships	(Italy) Val Gardena	(Switzerland) Bernhard Russi	(Switzerland) Annerösli Zryd	(Austria) Karl Cordin	(France) Isabelle Mir	(Australia) Malcolm Milne	(Austria) Annemarie Pröll
1968	Winter Olympic Games *	(France) Grenoble	(France) Jean-Claude Killy	(Austria) Olga Pall	(France) Guy Périllat	(France) Isabelle Mir	(Switzerland) Jean-Daniel Dätwyler	(Austria) Christl Haas
1966	FIS Alpine World Ski Championships	(Chile) Portillo	(France) Jean-Claude Killy	(France) Marielle Goitschel	(France) Léo Lacroix	(France) Annie Famose	(Germany) Franz Vogler	(Germany) Burgl Färbinger
1964	Winter Olympic Games *	(Austria) Innsbruck	(Austria) Egon Zimmermann	(Austria) Christl Haas	(France) Léo Lacroix	(Austria) Edith Zimmermann	(Germany) Wolfgang Bartels	(Austria) Traudl Hecher
1962	FIS Alpine World Ski Championships	(France) Chamonix	(Austria) Karl Schranz	(Austria) Christl Haas	(France) Émile Viollat	(Italy) Pia Riva	(Austria) Egon Zimmermann	(United States) Barbara Ferries
1960	Winter Olympic Games *	(United States) Squaw Valley	(France) Jean Vuarnet	(Germany) Heidi Biebl	(Germany) Hans Peter Lanig	(United States) Penny Pitou	(France) Guy Périllat	(Austria) Traudl Hecher
1958	FIS Alpine World Ski Championships	(Austria) Bad Gastein	(Austria) Toni Sailer	Lucile Wheeler	(Switzerland) Roger Staub	(Switzerland) Frieda Dänzer	(France) Jean Vuarnet	(Italy) Carla Marchelli
1956	Winter Olympic Games *	(Italy) Cortina d'Ampezzo	(Austria) Toni Sailer	(Switzerland) Madeleine Berthod	(Switzerland) Raymond Fellay	(Switzerland) Frieda Dänzer	(Austria) Anderl Molterer	Lucile Wheeler

(*) - also served as WCH (GS and Combined were competed as well but did not count four WOG)

== See also ==
- List of men's World Cup downhill title winners
- List of women's World Cup downhill title winners
- List of Olympic medalists in men's downhill
- List of Olympic medalists in women's downhill
- List of Paralympic medalists in men's downhill
- List of Paralympic medalists in women's downhill
- List of World Champions in downhill
- List of men's downhill races in the FIS Alpine Ski World Cup
