= List of men's downhill races in the FIS Alpine Ski World Cup =

This is a list of Men's Downhill races in FIS Alpine Ski World Cup from 1967 to 2017.

Venue	1960s			1970s										1980s										1990s										2000s										2010s										Total
Venue	7	8	9	0	1	2	3	4	5	6	7	8	9	0	1	2	3	4	5	6	7	8	9	0	1	2	3	4	5	6	7	8	9	0	1	2	3	4	5	6	7	8	9	0	1	2	3	4	5	6	7	8	9	
(Austria) Altenmarkt im Pongau																																				●																		1
(Sweden) Åre																				●●		●					●●											●					●			●								8
(United States) Aspen		●								●					●●	●●	●	●	●	●	●		●		●●	●		●●																							●			18
(France) Avoriaz								●																																														1
(Austria) Bad Kleinkirchheim																			●			●																																2
(United States) Beaver Creek																						●●										●●		●	●		●	●●	●	●	●	●	●	●		●	●	●	●	●				20
(Italy) Bormio																												●	●	●	●	●●	●	●		●●	●●		●	●	●●	●	●	●	●	●	●	●						23
(Canada) Calgary																					●																																	1
(France) Chamonix		●																										●			●			●				●	●			●			●	●●				●				11
(Italy) Cortina d'Ampezzo			●									●						●						●●																														5
(Switzerland) Crans-Montana													●			●																●																						3
(United States) Crystal Mountain									●●																																													2
(United States) Franconia	●																																																					1
(Japan) Furano																			●		●																																	2
(Germany) Garmisch-Partenkirchen				●			●●	●	●		●		●		●	●		●	●		●				●	●	●●			●	●	●		●	●		●	●●	●●	●	●●			●		●	●		●	●	●●			36
(France) Chamrousse		●																																																				1
(Switzerland) Grindelwald							●																																															1
(United States) Heavenly Valley											●●																																											2
(Austria) Innsbruck									●																																													1
(United States) Jackson Hole				●					●																																													2
(South Korea) Jeongseon																																																		●				1
(Austria) Kitzbühel	●	●	●			●●	●	●	●	●	●	●●	●	●	●	●●	●●	●	●●	●●	●		●●	●	●	●●		●	●●	●	●●	●●	●●	●	●	●	●	●●		●		●	●	●	●	●	●	●	●	●	●			58
(Norway) Kvitfjell																											●●		●	●	●	●	●●	●●	●●	●	●	●	●		●	●●	●●	●	●●	●	●	●	●	●	●●			31
(Switzerland) Laax											●	●●									●		●																															5
(Canada) Lake Louise														●			●	●							●									●	●		●	●	●	●	●	●	●	●	●	●	●	●	●	●				20
(United States) Lake Placid													●																																									1
(Argentina) Las Leñas																				●●	●●																																	4
(Switzerland) Lenzerheide																																							●		●				●			●						4
(France) Les Houches												●																																										1
(Switzerland) Leukerbad																									●●																													2
(Italy) Madonna di Campiglio										●																																												1
(France) Megève	●		●	●	●●				●																																													6
(France) Méribel																																																	●					1
(France) Morzine										●	●●		●										●●																															6
(Canada) Panorama																			●							●●																												3
(Switzerland) Pontresina																	●																																					1
(France) Pra-Loup														●																																								1
(Austria) Saalbach-Hinterglemm																												●																					●					2
(Bosnia and Herzegovina) Sarajevo																	●																																					1
(Austria) Schladming								●		●			●					●		●		●		●																						●								8
(Italy) Sestriere	●				●																																	●																3
(Spain) Sierra Nevada																											●						●																					2
(Russia) Sochi																																														●								1
(Austria) Sankt Anton am Arlberg			●				●								●		●						●				●											●																7
(Switzerland) Saint Moritz					●	●	●		●						●																		●															●		●				8
(Italy) Santa Caterina																																																	●	●				2
(United States) Sugarloaf					●●																																																	2
(United States) Vail																												●		●	●																							3
(France) Val-d'Isère				●	●	●	●	●	●	●		●		●	●	●	●●	●		●	●	●●		●●	●	●			●●	●	●		●		●●	●	●		●	●	●										●			35
(Italy) Val Gardena			●	●		●	●		●		●●	●	●●	●	●●	●	●●	●	●	●	●	●	●●	●	●●	●	●●	●●		●	●●		●●	●●		●●	●	●	●	●	●	●	●	●	●		●	●	●	●	●			54
(Switzerland) Veysonnaz																											●			●●																								3
(Switzerland) Villars-sur-Ollon													●																																									1
(Switzerland) Wengen	●	●	●	●				●	●	●●	●			●●	●	●		●	●●		●		●●			●		●	●●		●	●●	●	●		●	●●		●	●	●	●	●	●	●	●	●	●	●	●	●			43
(Canada) Whistler																●		●		●			●				●	●	●																									7
(Austria) Zell am See								●																																														1
Number of races	5	5	6	6	7	7	8	7	9	8	10	8	9	7	10	10	11	10	10	13	11	10	10	9	8	9	10	11	9	9	11	11	10	11	9	10	11	12	11	9	11	9	9	8	9	11	8	9	10	11	9			471
