= Gerhard Mussner =

Italian alpine skier (born 1943)

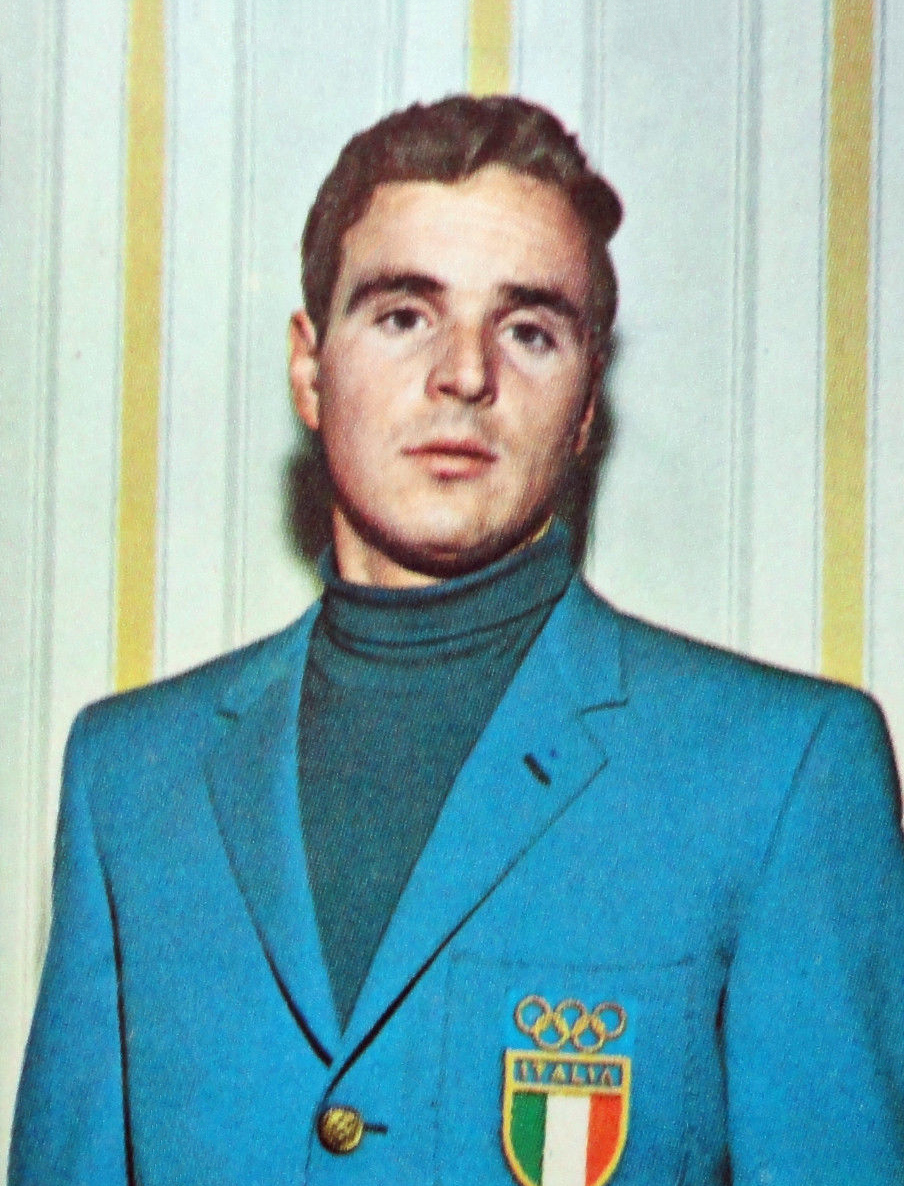
- Gerhard Mussner c. 1968

Personal information
- Born: 5 October 1943 (age 82) Selva di Val Gardena, Italy
- Height: 1.75 m (5 ft 9 in)
- Weight: 75 kg (165 lb)

Sport
- Sport: Alpine skiing

Gerhard Mussner (born 5 October 1943) is an Italian former alpine skier. He competed at the 1968 Winter Olympics in the downhill, slalom and giant slalom events with the best result of 11th place in the downhill.
