= Robert Swan (alpine skier) =

Canadian alpine skier (born 1943)

Robert Swan (born 26 February 1943 in Winnipeg, Manitoba) is a Canadian former alpine skier who competed in the 1964 Winter Olympics and 1968 Winter Olympics.

Consistent with Robert Swan's commitment to Alpine skiing, he donated his used equipment every year to the kids of a remote community in the Chelsea, Quebec area, where he lived throughout his teenage years. His generosity was inspirational and widely appreciated.
