= Jim Barrows =

American alpine skier (1944–2024)

Jim Barrows (25 April 1944 – 28 June 2024) was an American alpine skier who competed in the 1968 Winter Olympics. He later taught Ski History at Colorado Mountain College in Steamboat Springs, Colorado. Barrows died in Steamboat Springs on June 28, 2024, at the age of 80.
