= Peter Rohr =

Swiss alpine skier

Personal information
- Born: 4 February 1945 (age 81)

Skiing career
- Sport: Alpine skiing
- Retired: 1970
- Disciplines: Speed events
- World Cup debut: 1967

World Cup
- Seasons: 4
- Podiums: 1

Peter Rohr (born 4 February 1945) is a former Swiss alpine skier.

== Career ==
During his career he has achieved 5 results among the top 10 (one podium) in the World Cup.

== World Cup results ==
Top 10

Date	Place	Discipline	Rank
14-12-1969	(France) Val d'Isere	Downhill	9
14-02-1969	(Italy) Val Gardena	Downhill	9
09-02-1969	(Italy) Cortina d'Ampezzo	Downhill	3
24-02-1968	(France) Chamonix	Downhill	8
03-03-1967	(Italy) Sestriere	Downhill	6
