= Jules Melquiond =

French alpine skier

Personal information
- Born: 19 August 1941 (age 84) Serre Chevalier, France

Skiing career
- Sport: Alpine skiing
- Retired: 1976
- Disciplines: Technical events
- World Cup debut: 1967

World Cup
- Seasons: 1
- Podiums: 2
Medal record
Men's alpine skiing
Representing France
World Cup race podiums
Event	1st	2nd	3rd
Slalom	0	1	1

Jules Melquiond (born 19 August 1941) is a former French alpine skier.

He is the father of Benjamin Melquiond, Super G junior world champion in 1994.

== Career ==
During his career he has achieved 4 results among the top 10 (2 podiums) in the World Cup.

== World Cup results ==
Top 10

Date	Place	Discipline	Rank
11 March 1967	(United States) Franconia	Slalom	6
5 February 1967	(Italy) Madonna di Campiglio	Slalom	4
15 January 1967	(Switzerland) Wengen	Slalom	3
5 January 1967	(Germany) Berchtesgaden	Slalom	2
