= Hans Peter Rohr =

Swiss alpine skier

Personal information
- Born: 4 September 1943 (age 82)

Skiing career
- Sport: Alpine skiing
- Retired: 1970
- Disciplines: Speed events
- World Cup debut: 1967

World Cup
- Seasons: 4
- Podiums: 2

Hans Peter Rohr (born 4 September 1943) is a former Swiss alpine skier.

== Career ==
During his career he has achieved 6 results among the top 10 (2 podiums) in the World Cup.

== World Cup results ==
Top 3

Date	Place	Discipline	Rank
09-02-1969	(Italy) Cortina d'Ampezzo	Downhill	3
27-01-1967	(France) Megeve	Downhill	2
