= Louis Jauffret =

French alpine skier

Personal information
- Born: 21 February 1943 (age 83) Montgenèvre, France

Skiing career
- Sport: Alpine skiing
- Retired: 1967
- Disciplines: Technical events
- World Cup debut: 1967

World Championships
- Teams: 1
- Medals: 1

World Cup
- Seasons: 1
- Wins: 2
Medal record
Men's alpine skiing
Representing France
World Cup race podiums: Event / 1st / 2nd / 3rd; Slalom / 0 / 1 / 1
World Championships
Bronze medal – third place	1966 Portillo	Slalom

Louis Jauffret (born 21 February 1943) is a former French alpine skier.

== Career ==
During his career he has achieved 4 results among the top 10 (2 podiums) in the World Cup.

== World Cup results ==
Top 10

Date	Place	Discipline	Rank
05-02-1967	(Italy) Madonna di Campiglio	Slalom	2
29-01-1967	(France) Megeve	Slalom	4
22-01-1967	(Austria) Kitzbuehel	Slalom	3
15-01-1967	(Switzerland) Wengen	Slalom	4
