= Andreas Sprecher =

Swiss alpine skier (born 1944)

Andreas Sprecher (born 8 November 1944 in Davos) is a Swiss former alpine skier who competed in the 1968 Winter Olympics and 1972 Winter Olympics.
