= Werner Bleiner =

Austrian alpine skier (born 1946)

Werner Bleiner (born 26 May 1946) is an Austrian former alpine skier who competed in the 1968 Winter Olympics and 1972 Winter Olympics.
