= Franz Vogler =

German alpine skier (born 1944)

Franz Vogler (born 15 August 1944 in Oberstdorf) is a German former alpine skier who competed in the 1968 Winter Olympics and 1972 Winter Olympics.
