= Jean-Daniel Dätwyler =

Swiss alpine skier (born 1945)

Medal record

Representing Switzerland

Men's Alpine skiing

Olympic Games
Bronze medal – third place	1968 Grenoble	Downhill

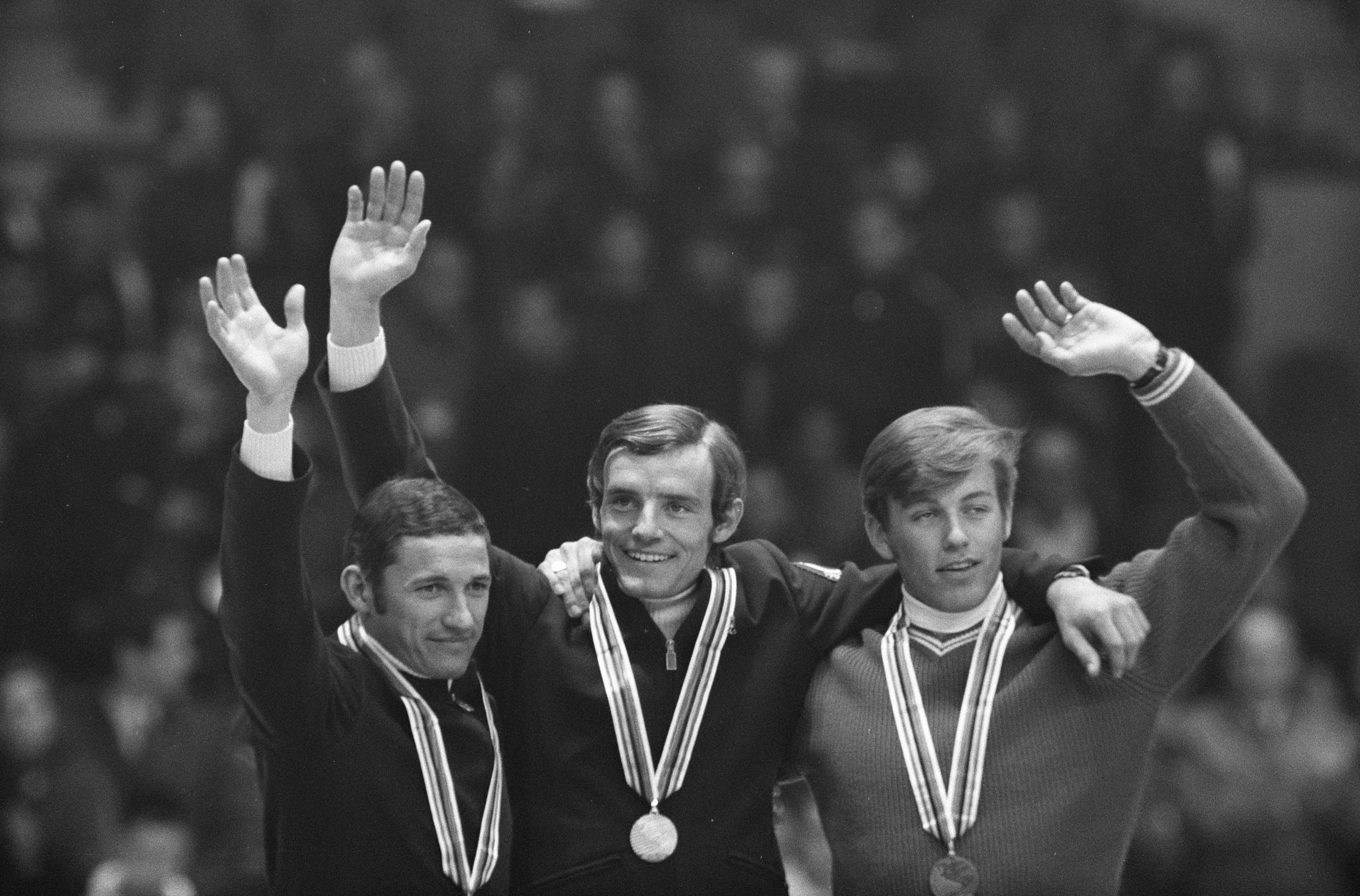
Olympische Spelen Grenoble, afdaling ceremony, in midden Killy (Frankrijk), Bestanddeelnr 921-0677.jpg

Jean-Daniel Dätwyler (born 2 April 1945) is a Swiss former alpine skier and Olympic medalist. He received a bronze medal in the downhill at the 1968 Winter Olympics in Grenoble.

== See also ==
- Villars-sur-Ollon
