= Léo Lacroix (skier) =

French alpine skier (born 1937)

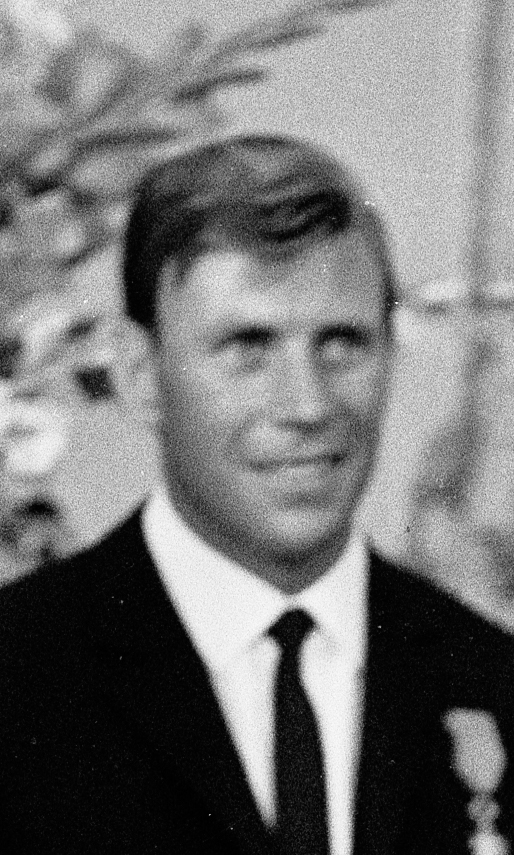
- Lacroix, pictured in 1964

Personal information
- Born: November 26, 1937 (age 88)
Medal record
Men's alpine skiing
Representing France
Olympic Games
Silver medal – second place	1964 Innsbruck	Downhill

Léo Lacroix (born 26 November 1937) is a French alpine skier who competed in the 1960s. Competing in two Winter Olympics, he won a silver medal in the men's downhill event at Innsbruck in 1964.
