= Guy Périllat =

French alpine skier (born 1940)

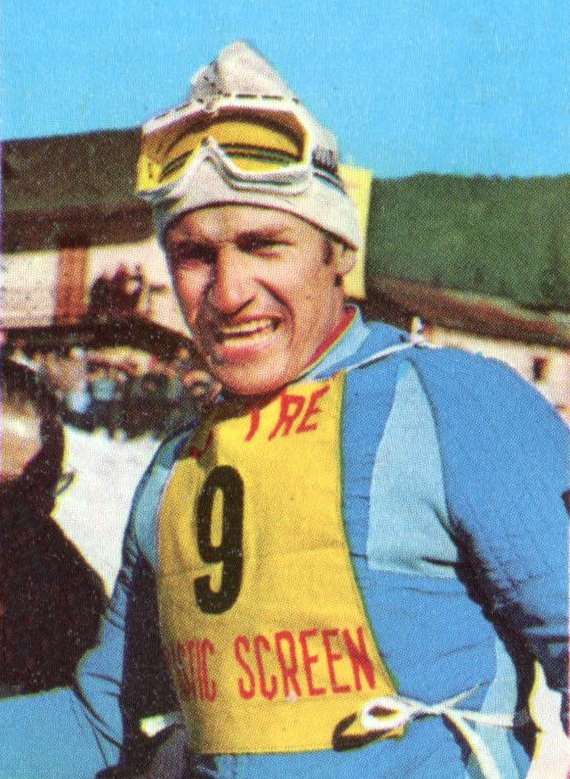
- circa 1966

Personal information
- Born: 24 February 1940 (age 86) Annecy, Haute-Savoie, France
- Height: 1.68 m (5 ft 6 in)
- Weight: 68 kg (150 lb)

Sport
- Sport: Alpine skiing
- Club: Club Ski de La Clusaz
Medal record
Men's alpine skiing
Representing France
Olympic Games
Silver medal – second place	1968 Grenoble	Downhill
Bronze medal – third place	1960 Squaw Valley	Downhill
World Championships
Gold medal – first place	1960 Squaw Valley	Combined
Gold medal – first place	1966 Portillo	Giant slalom
Silver medal – second place	1962 Chamonix	Slalom
Silver medal – second place	1966 Portillo	Slalom

Guy Périllat Merceroz (born 24 February 1940) is a former World Cup alpine ski racer from the resort of La Clusaz, Haute-Savoie, one of the top ski racers of the 1960s.

== Biography ==
On his twentieth birthday at the 1960 Winter Olympics, Périllat won the gold medal in the combined, a non-Olympic event at the time, but a World Championship title. Two days earlier, he won a bronze medal in the downhill. The following year, Périllat won both the classic downhills of Wengen and Kitzbühel, at the time only the third racer to have accomplished the feat in the same season.

The count now includes ten racers, with Austrians as the only multiple double-winners; Toni Sailer twice (1956–57), and Franz Klammer three consecutive (1975–77). The others are Christian Pravda of Austria (1954), Jean-Claude Killy of France (1967), Karl Schranz of Austria (1969), Roland Collombin of Switzerland (1974), Ken Read of Canada (1980), Franz Heinzer of Switzerland (1992), and Stephan Eberharter of Austria (2002).

At the 1962 World Championships in Chamonix, France, Périllat took second in the slalom. Four years later at Portillo, Chile in August 1966, he won the world championship in the giant slalom and again took the silver in the slalom.

While most of his success came before the World Cup era, Périllat won two slalom races in the first season of 1967.

Périllat took the silver medal in the downhill at the 1968 Winter Olympics, finishing behind countryman Jean-Claude Killy. Périllat retired from international competition following the 1969 season at age 29.

== World Cup results ==
=== Season standings ===
Season	Age	Overall	Slalom	Giant Slalom	Super G	Downhill	Combined
1967	27	3	2	12	not run	2	not awarded
1968	28	5	25	6	not run	4	not awarded
1969	29	30	25	32	not run	13	not awarded

=== Race victories ===
Season	Date	Location	Race
1967	29 January 1967	(France) Megève	Slalom
1967	5 February 1967	(Italy) Madonna di Campiglio	Slalom

== World Championship results ==
Year	Age	Slalom	Giant Slalom	Super-G	Downhill	Combined
1960	20	6	6	not run	3	1
1962	21	2	DSQ	not run	6	—
1964	23	12	10	not run	6	5
1966	26	2	1	not run	63	11
1968	27	DSQ2	4	not run	2	—

From 1948 through 1980, the Winter Olympics were also the World Championships for alpine skiing.
At the World Championships from 1954 through 1980, the combined was a "paper race" using the results of the three events (DH, GS, SL).

== Olympic results ==
Year	Age	Slalom	Giant Slalom	Super-G	Downhill	Combined
1960	20	6	6	not run	3	not run
1964	23	12	10	not run	6	not run
1968	27	DSQ2	4	not run	2	not run
