= Heinrich Messner =

Austrian alpine skier (1939–2023)

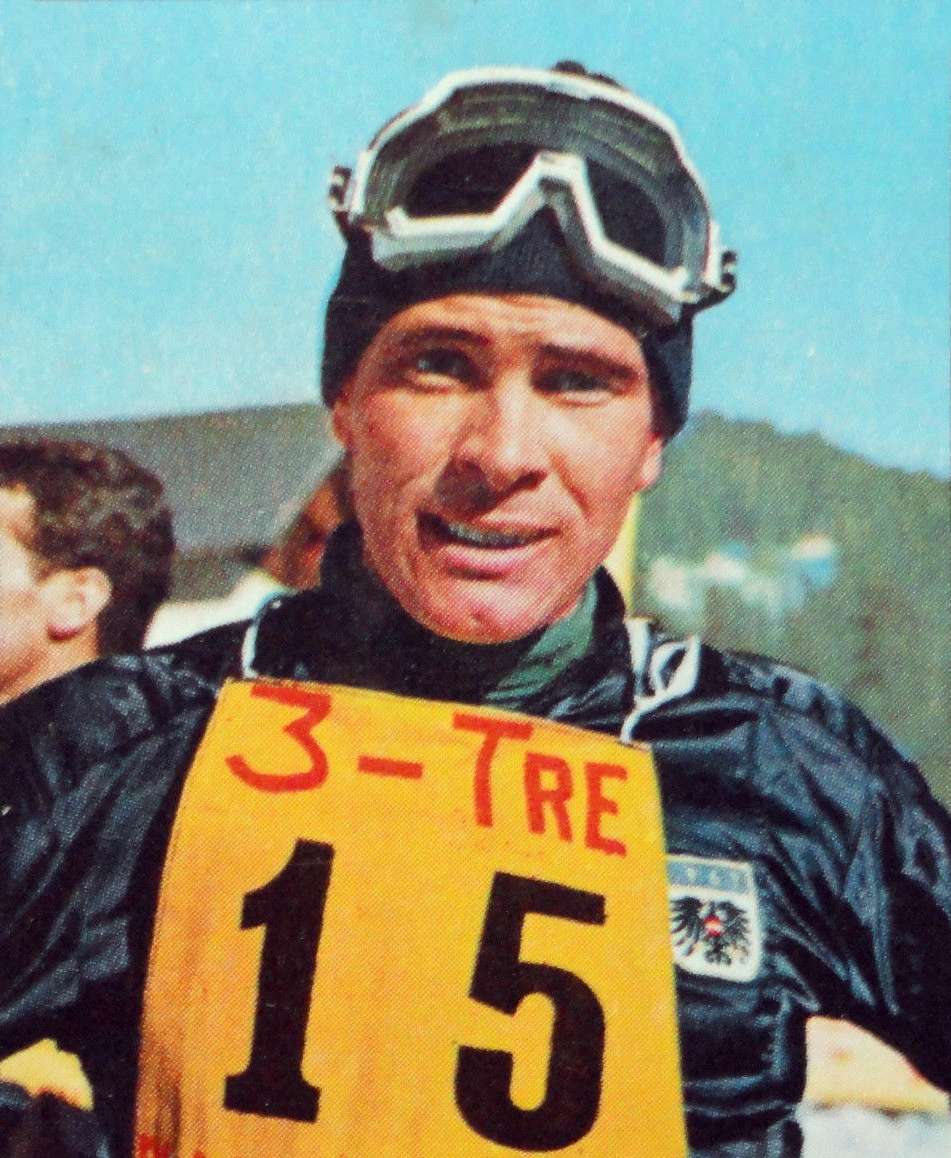
- Messner in 1968

Personal information
- Born: 1 September 1939 Obernberg am Brenner, Reichsgau Tirol-Vorarlberg, Germany (now Tyrol, Austria)
- Died: 19 October 2023 (aged 84) Austria
- Height: 1.76 m (5 ft 9 in)

Skiing career
- Sport: Alpine skiing
- Club: Sportverein Tirol
- Retired: 1972
- Disciplines: Polyvalent
- World Cup debut: 1967

Olympics
- Teams: 3
- Medals: 2

World Championships
- Teams: 5
- Medals: 3

World Cup
- Seasons: 5
- Wins: 1
- Podiums: 16
Medal record
Men's alpine skiing
Representing Austria
World Cup race podiums
Event	1st	2nd	3rd
Slalom	1	2	1
Giant slalom	0	0	2
Downhill	0	7	3
Total	1	9	6
International competitions
Event	1st	2nd	3rd
Olympic Games	0	0	2
World Championships	0	0	3
Total	0	0	5
Olympic Games
Bronze medal – third place	1968 Grenoble	Giant slalom
Bronze medal – third place	1972 Sapporo	Downhill
World Championships
Bronze medal – third place	1968 Grenoble	Combined

Heinrich "Heini" Messner (1 September 1939 – 19 October 2023) was an Austrian alpine skier. He competed at the 1964, 1968, and 1972 Olympics and won two bronze medals: in the giant slalom in 1968 and in the downhill in 1972.

== Biography ==
On 5 January 1967, Messner won the first race ever held in the World Cup - a slalom. He had 15 more World Cup podium finishes later in his career. In the 1970s, he pioneered the use of short skis in the technical races. Messner retired after the 1972 season and for two years trained the Austrian women’s team. He then moved to Steinach am Brenner where he ran a ski school, a boarding house, and a ski rental service.

Messner died in October 2023, at the age of 84.

== National titles ==
Messner won five national championships at individual senior level.

- Austria Alpine Ski Championships
  - Downhill: 1961
  - Giant slalom: 1967
  - Slalom: 1964, 1965, 1967
