= Karl Schranz =

Austrian alpine skier (born 1938)

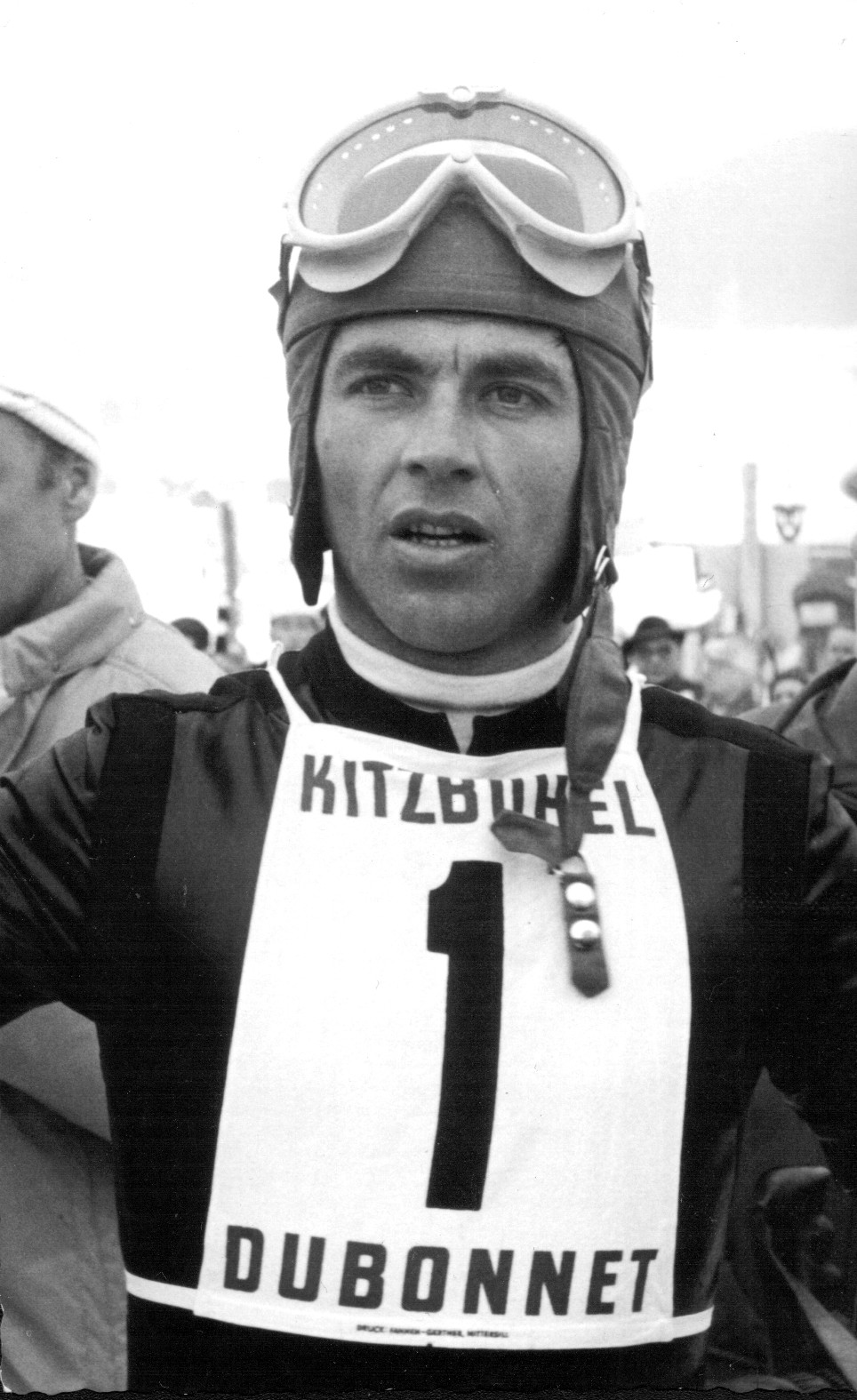
- Schranz at Kitzbühel

Personal information
- Born: 18 November 1938 (age 87) St. Anton, Tyrol, Austria
- Height: 175 cm (5 ft 9 in)
- Website: karlschranz.com

Skiing career
- Sport: Alpine skiing
- Retired: February 1972 (age 33)
- Disciplines: Downhill, giant slalom, slalom, combined
- World Cup debut: January 1967 (age 28) inaugural season

Olympics
- Teams: 3 – (1960, 1964, 1968)
- Medals: 1 (0 gold)

World Championships
- Teams: 6 – (1960–70) includes three Olympics
- Medals: 6 (3 gold)

World Cup
- Seasons: 6 – (1967–1972)
- Wins: 12 – (8 DH, 4 GS)
- Podiums: 23 – (12 DH, 9 GS, 2 SL)
- Overall titles: 2 – (1969, 1970)
- Discipline titles: 3 – (2 DH, 1 GS)
Medal record
Men's alpine skiing
Representing Austria
World Cup race podiums
| Event | 1st | 2nd | 3rd |
|---|---|---|---|
| Slalom | 0 | 1 | 1 |
| Giant slalom | 4 | 1 | 4 |
| Downhill | 8 | 1 | 3 |
| Total | 12 | 3 | 8 |
Olympic Games
| Silver medal – second place | 1964 Innsbruck | Giant slalom |
World Championships
| Gold medal – first place | 1962 Chamonix | Downhill |
| Gold medal – first place | 1962 Chamonix | Combined |
| Gold medal – first place | 1970 Val Gardena | Giant slalom |
| Silver medal – second place | 1962 Chamonix | Giant slalom |
| Bronze medal – third place | 1966 Portillo | Giant slalom |

Karl Schranz (born 18 November 1938) is a former champion alpine ski racer from Austria, one of the best of the 1960s and early 1970s.

Born and raised in St. Anton, Tyrol, Schranz had a lengthy ski racing career, from 1957 to 1972. He won twenty major downhills, many major giant slalom races and several major slaloms. Late in his career he was the successor to Jean-Claude Killy as the World Cup overall champion; Schranz won the title at age 30 in the third World Cup season of 1969, and repeated in 1970. He was also the downhill champion for those two seasons and was the giant slalom season champion in 1969. Schranz won both the "classic downhills" four times each: the Hahnenkamm at Kitzbühel, Austria (1966, 1969, 1972, 1972), and the Lauberhorn at Wengen, Switzerland (1959, 1963, 1966, 1969). He also excelled at the legendary Arlberg-Kandahar events, winning nine times, from 1957 (Chamonix) to 1970 (Garmisch-Partenkirchen).

== Early years ==
Schranz' father was a tunnel worker in St. Anton, which led to an early death from tuberculosis; his widow was left to raise five children. In addition to the hardship, their hut burned down. At age 12, Schranz became an apprentice ski maker, then worked in a sawmill, and later became a ski tester. Schranz began skiing before age five on salvaged broken skis, left by tourists and reworked by his father.

At age 18, he won the first of three consecutive Arlberg-Kandahar downhill and combined titles at Chamonix in March 1957. Schranz won again the following year, rotated back to his hometown at St. Anton, and also in 1959 at Garmisch, West Germany. He missed the 1958 World Championships in Bad Gastein due to illness.

== Olympics ==
The Olympics were unfortunately Schranz's nemesis. His disqualification from his fourth Olympics in 1972 for acknowledging that he, like all other top racers, was not a pure amateur caused a furor and subsequent reform of the IOC. In his first Olympics in 1960, at age 21, Schranz was injured but started anyway and finished seventh in both the downhill and giant slalom. He won a silver medal in giant slalom in 1964 at Innsbruck, despite being ill with the flu.

In 1968 at Grenoble, France, Schranz competed in all three alpine events, held at Chamrousse. He finished fifth in the downhill and sixth in the giant slalom, both won by rival Jean-Claude Killy of the host country. In his first run in the slalom, Schranz's time was only 0.32 behind. His second run was run in a very dense fog, which hampered his visibility, and Schranz claimed he was impeded by a race official which affected his race. He was given another chance to run the second run and took the lead, but was later informed that his first attempt at run two should have been counted as he missed a gate before encountering the race official, and Schranz was disqualified. A jury upheld the decision and Killy was declared the winner for a third Olympic gold medal in the same games. There was a great deal of controversy over the suspicion that partisan French officials were attempting unfairly to prevent Schranz from winning so that Killy would sweep all three races, duplicating Toni Sailer's 1956 sweep.

Schranz had better success at the world championships of non-Olympic years: gold in the downhill and combined in 1962 and gold in the giant slalom in 1970. (From 1948 through 1980, the Winter Olympics were also the world championships for alpine skiing.)

Classified as a professional by the International Olympic Committee, Schranz was banned from the 1972 Winter Olympics and retired from the World Cup circuit in mid-February at age 33. In July 1973, he joined the pro ski racing circuit.

Schranz later became a hotel owner in his hometown of St. Anton and played a key role in organizing the 2001 World Championships. The downhill course developed for those championships was named Karl-Schranz-Piste.

== World Cup results ==
=== Season titles ===
- 5 titles - (2 overall, 2 DH, 1 GS)

| Season | Discipline |
|---|---|
| 1969 | Overall |
| 1969 | Downhill |
| 1969 | Giant slalom |
| 1970 | Overall |
| 1970 | Downhill |

=== Season standings ===
| Season | Age | Overall | Slalom | Giant Slalom | Super G | Downhill | Combined |
|---|---|---|---|---|---|---|---|
| 1967 | 28 | 7 | 7 | 8 | not run | 13 | not awarded |
| 1968 | 29 | 8 | 20 | 11 | not run | 3 | not awarded |
| 1969 | 30 | 1 | 9 | 1 | not run | 1 | not awarded |
| 1970 | 31 | 1 | 13 | 4 | not run | 1 | not awarded |
| 1971 | 32 | 11 | — | 12 | not run | 8 | not awarded |
| 1972 | 33 | 8 | — | — | not run | 2 | not awarded |

Results from the 1968 Winter Olympics and 1970 World Championships were included the World Cup standings.

=== Race victories ===
- 12 wins - (8 DH, 4 GS)
- 23 podiums - (12 DH, 9 GS, 2 SL)

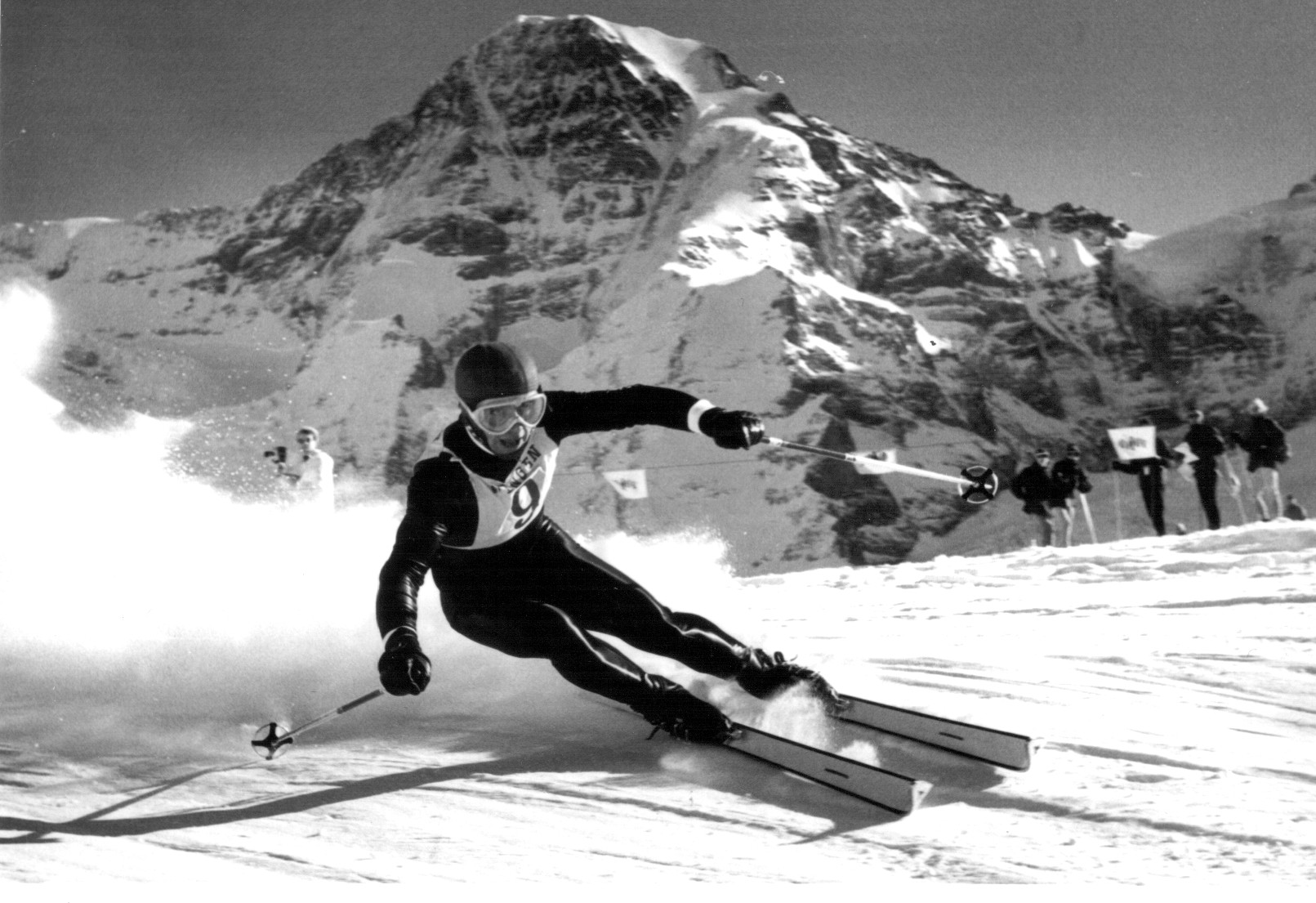
Schranz winning at Wengen in 1966, prior to the first World Cup season

| Season | Date | Location | Discipline |
|---|---|---|---|
| 1969 | 12 December 1968 | Val-d'Isère, France | Giant slalom |
| 1969 | 11 January 1969 | Wengen, Switzerland | Downhill |
| 1969 | 18 January 1969 | Kitzbühel, Austria | Downhill |
| 1969 | 1 February 1969 | St. Anton, Austria | Downhill |
| 1969 | 15 March 1969 | Mont St. Anne, Canada | Giant slalom |
| 1970 | 5 January 1970 | Adelboden, Switzerland | Giant slalom |
| 1970 | 23 January 1970 | Megève, France | Downhill |
| 1970 | 1 February 1970 | Garmisch, West Germany | Downhill |
| 1970 | 10 February 1970 | Val Gardena, Italy | Giant slalom |
| 1972 | 12 December 1971 | Val-d'Isère, France | Downhill |
| 1972 | 14 January 1972 | Kitzbühel, Austria | Downhill |
| 1972 | 15 January 1972 | Kitzbühel, Austria | Downhill |

== World Championship results ==
| Year | Age | Slalom | Giant Slalom | Super-G | Downhill | Combined |
|---|---|---|---|---|---|---|
| 1958 | 19 | — | — | not run | — | — |
| 1960 | 21 | — | 7 | not run | 7 | — |
| 1962 | 23 | 4 | 2 | not run | 1 | 1 |
| 1964 | 25 | 24 | 2 | not run | 11 | 6 |
| 1966 | 27 | DNF1 | 3 | not run | 9 | — |
| 1968 | 29 | DSQ2 | 6 | not run | 5 | — |
| 1970 | 31 | DNF2 | 1 | not run | 4 | — |
| 1972 | 33 | — | — | not run | — | — |

From 1948 through 1980, the Winter Olympics were also the World Championships for alpine skiing.
At the World Championships from 1954 through 1980, the combined was a "paper race" using the results of the three events (DH, GS, SL).

1958: illness
1972: banned by IOC

== Olympic results ==
| Year | Age | Slalom | Giant Slalom | Super-G | Downhill | Combined |
|---|---|---|---|---|---|---|
| 1960 | 21 | — | 7 | not run | 7 | not run |
| 1964 | 25 | 24 | 2 | not run | 11 | not run |
| 1968 | 29 | DSQ2 | 6 | not run | 5 | not run |
| 1972 | 33 | — | — | not run | — | not run |
