= Gerhard Nenning =

Austrian alpine skier (1940–1995)

Medal record

Men's alpine skiing

Representing Austria

World Championships
Silver medal – second place	1964 Innsbruck	Combined

Gerhard Nenning (29 September 1940 in Lech – 22 June 1995 in Bregenz) was an Austrian alpine skier who competed in the 1964 Winter Olympics (6th in the giant slalom, 7th in the downhill and 7th in the slalom) and 1968 Winter Olympics (8th in the giant slalom, 9th in the slalom).

== Biography ==
He could have won the silver medal in the Alpine Combined in that 1964 Winter Olympics, but that medal did only count for the FIS Alpine Skiing World Championships. In another FIS Alpine Skiing World Championships he could achieve a silver medal in the Alpine Combined and bronze medal in the slalom (and placed 5th in the downhill and 8th in the giant slalom) in 1962, and place 7th in the downhill and 13th in the slalom in 1966 (he didn't finish the second leg in the giant slalom).

Before establishing the World Cup, he did win several relevant races like the slalom at Kitzbühel in 1961, die Alpine Combined at Kitzbühel in 1962, the giant slalom at Madonna di Campiglio in 1963, the Alpine Combined at Wengen in 1964, the slalom and Alpine Combined at St. Anton am Arlberg in 1965, the slalom at Mürren and the slalom at Banff (all in 1966). He could win another downhill race on February 12, 1967, in the so-called "Alpen Cup" at Bad Gastein (a race outside of the World Cup). He became an Austrian Champion in the Combined 1963 and in the downhill 1967.

In the World Cup he could gain his first points when he was placed 8th in the downhill at Wengen on January 14, 1967. He won three downhill races and became 4th in the downhill World Cup 1967 but won the downhill World Cup in the next year (and became 4th in the overall World Cup). For he did win the high-class downhill races at Wengen (January 13, 1968) and at Kitzbühel (January 20, 1968), the previous downhill races of the Olympic downhill race, he was a cofavorite but he couldn't show his performance at Chamrousse and had to be content with the disappointing ninth place. Because winning the finish downhill race of the season, on March 15, at Aspen he could achieve the Downhill World Cup 1967-68. He did retire after the season 1969-70.
