= 1968 Alpine Skiing World Cup – Men's overall =

1968 men's overall World Cup
Previous: 1967	Next: 1969

Men's overall World Cup 1967/1968

== Final point standings ==
In men's overall World Cup 1967/68 the best three downhills, best three giant slaloms and best three slaloms count. Deductions are given in ().

Place	Name	Country	Total points	Total deduction	Downhill		Giant slalom		Slalom
1	Jean-Claude Killy	France	200	(37)	60		75	(22)	65	(15)
2	Dumeng Giovanoli	Switzerland	119	(22)	6		43	(11)	70	(11)
3	Herbert Huber	Austria	112	(15)	0		52		60	(15)
4	Gerhard Nenning	Austria	102	(2)	75	(2)	10		17
5	Guy Périllat	France	83	(6)	37		41	(6)	5
6	Edmund Bruggmann	Switzerland	80	(6)	17		60	(6)	3
7	Billy Kidd	United States	73		17		30		26
8	Karl Schranz	Austria	69	(8)	39	(8)	22		8
9	Patrick Russel	France	67		0		6		61
10	Heinrich Messner	Austria	63		31		15		17
11	Georges Mauduit	France	57	(3)	0		51	(3)	6
12	Håkon Mjøen	Norway	52		0		11		41
13	Alfred Matt	Austria	51	(26)	0		1		50	(26)
14	Rick Chaffee	United States	46		0		8		38
15	Jean-Pierre Augert	France	44		0		14		30
16	Reinhard Tritscher	Austria	43		0		35		8
17	Spider Sabich	United States	41	(3)	4		0		37	(3)
18	Bernard Orcel	France	39	(3)	37	(3)	2		0
19	Jean-Daniel Dätwyler	Switzerland	37	(3)	37	(3)	0		0
	Stefan Kälin	Switzerland	37		0		16		21
21	Werner Bleiner	Austria	31		0		28		3
22	Willy Favre	Switzerland	28		0		28		0
23	Kurt Huggler	Switzerland	26		20		6		0
24	Franz Digruber	Austria	20		0		0		20
25	Andreas Sprecher	Switzerland	15		15		0		0
26	Andrzej Bachleda	Poland	14		0		0		14
27	Peter Frei	Switzerland	13		0		4		9
28	Jimmy Heuga	United States	13		0		1		12
29	Rune Lindström	Sweden	11		0		0		11
	Norbert Wendner	Austria	11		0		0		11
	Miroslav Pažout	Czechoslovakia	11		0		11		0
32	Josef Minsch	Switzerland	10		10		0		0
	Franz Vogler	West Germany	10		10		0		0
	Rudi Sailer	Austria	10		10		0		0
35	Jakob Tischhauser	Switzerland	8		0		8		0
	Stefan Sodat	Austria	8		0		0		8
	Sepp Heckelmiller	West Germany	8		0		8		0
	Dodge Phelps	United States	8		8		0		0
39	Gerhard Mussner	Italy	7		4		3		0
40	Ivo Mahlknecht	Italy	6		6		0		0
	Josef Loidl	Austria	6		0		6		0
	Peter Lakota	Yugoslavia	6		0		0		6
	Josef Pechtl	Austria	6		0		6		0
44	Alain Penz	France	5		0		0		5
45	Ludwig Leitner	West Germany	4		4		0		0
	Gerhard Prinzing	West Germany	4		4		0		0
	Hansjörg Schlager	West Germany	4		4		0		0
	Bjarne Strand	Norway	4		0		4		0
	H. Hinterholzer	Austria	4		0		0		4
	Dennis McCoy	United States	4		0		0		4
51	Kurt Schnider	Switzerland	3		0		3		0
	Peter Rohr	Switzerland	3		3		0		0
	Gerhardt Riml	Austria	3		0		3		0
	R. Schaller	Austria	3		0		0		3
	Jean-Luc Pinel	France	3		0		3		0
	Peter Duncan	Canada	3		0		0		3
57	Carlo Senoner	Italy	2		0		0		2
	Hans Zinge	Switzerland	2		2		0		0
	Blaž Jakopič	Yugoslavia	2		0		0		2
	Jeremy Palmer-Tomkinson	United Kingdom	2		0		2		0
	Robert Swan	Canada	2		0		0		2
62	Egon Zimmermann	Austria	1		1		0		0
	Otto Tschudi	Norway	1		0		0		1
	Michel Dätwyler	Switzerland	1		1		0		0
	Jon Terje Overland	Norway	1		0		0		1
	E. Wurner	Yugoslavia	1		0		0		1
	Michel Bozon	France	1		0		1		0

Alpine skiing World Cup
Men

Overall | Downhill | Giant slalom | Slalom

1968
