= 1969 Alpine Skiing World Cup – Men's giant slalom =

1969 Men's giant slalom World Cup
Previous: 1968	Next: 1970

Men's giant slalom World Cup 1968/1969

== Final point standings ==
In men's giant slalom World Cup 1968/69 the best 3 results count. Deductions are given in ().

Place	Name	Country	Total points	Deduction	1 (France)	3 (Switzerland)	11 (Sweden)	15 (Socialist Federal Republic of Yugoslavia)	18 (United States)	19 (Canada)	21 (United States)
1	Karl Schranz	Austria	70	(32)	25	(15)	-	(6)	(11)	25	20
2	Reinhard Tritscher	Austria	61	(3)	-	11	-	25	25	(3)	-
3	Jean-Noël Augert	France	58		-	25	25	-	-	-	8
4	Jakob Tischhauser	Switzerland	55	(19)	-	(4)	20	-	20	15	(15)
5	Dumeng Giovanoli	Switzerland	48		-	-	-	3	-	20	25
6	Alain Penz	France	32	(7)	6	-	15	-	(3)	(4)	11
7	Bernard Orcel	France	26		20	6	-	-	-	-	-
	Heinrich Messner	Austria	26		-	-	-	-	15	11	-
9	Henri Duvillard	France	22		15	-	-	-	-	6	1
10	Jean-Pierre Augert	France	20		-	20	-	-	-	-	-
	Alfred Matt	Austria	20		-	-	-	20	-	-	-
12	Franz Digruber	Austria	15		-	-	-	15	-	-	-
	Pier Lorenzo Clataud	Italy	15		-	-	11	-	4	-	-
	Billy Kidd	United States	15		-	3	-	-	6	-	6
	Patrick Russel	France	15		11	-	-	-	-	-	4
	Edmund Bruggmann	Switzerland	15		-	-	-	11	-	2	2
17	Claudio de Tasis	Italy	13		-	-	-	-	2	8	3
18	Spider Sabich	United States	12		-	-	-	4	8	-	-
19	Kurt Schnider	Switzerland	8		8	-	-	-	-	-	-
	Gerhard Nenning	Austria	8		-	8	-	-	-	-	-
	Rune Lindström	Sweden	8		-	-	8	-	-	-	-
	Sepp Heckelmiller	West Germany	8		-	-	-	8	-	-	-
23	Georges Mauduit	France	6		-	-	6	-	-	-	-
	Rick Chaffee	United States	6		-	1	4	-	-	1	-
25	Roger Rossat-Mignod	France	4		4	-	-	-	-	-	-
	David Zwilling	Austria	4		-	2	2	-	-	-	-
	Eberhard Schmalzl	Italy	4		-	-	3	1	-	-	-
28	Rudi Sailer	Austria	3		3	-	-	-	-	-	-
29	Jean-Louis Ambroise	France	2		2	-	-	-	-	-	-
	Andrzej Bachleda	Poland	2		-	-	-	2	-	-	-
	Herbert Huber	Austria	2		-	-	1	-	1	-	-
32	Hans Zingre	Switzerland	1		1	-	-	-	-	-	-
	Guy Périllat	France	1		1	-	-	-	-	-	-

Alpine Skiing World Cup
Men

Overall | Downhill | Giant slalom | Slalom

1969
