= 1969 Alpine Skiing World Cup – Men's slalom =

1969 Men's slalom World Cup
Previous: 1968	Next: 1970

Men's slalom World Cup 1968/1969

== Final point standings ==
In 1969, only the best three results counted; deductions are given in ().
Points were only awarded for top ten finishes (see scoring system).

Place	Name	Country	Total points	Deduction	2 (Germany)	5 (Switzerland)	7 (Austria)	9 (France)	12 (Sweden)	16 (Socialist Federal Republic of Yugoslavia)	17 (United States)	20 (Canada)	22 (United States)
1	Patrick Russel	France	65	(41)	15	-	25	-	25	-	(15)	(11)	(15)
	Alfred Matt	Austria	65	(12)	25	(11)	(1)	-	15	-	-	25	-
	Alain Penz	France	65	(14)	(6)	-	(8)	25	-	20	20	-	-
	Jean-Noël Augert	France	65	(6)	-	-	(6)	-	20	-	-	20	25
5	Herbert Huber	Austria	60	(41)	(3)	-	20	20	(11)	(15)	(8)	(4)	20
6	Reinhard Tritscher	Austria	47	(14)	11	25	11	(11)	-	-	(3)	-	-
7	Spider Sabich	United States	43	(8)	-	20	(4)	15	-	(3)	(1)	8	-
8	Billy Kidd	United States	40		-	-	-	-	-	-	25	15	-
9	Karl Schranz	Austria	37	(4)	20	-	-	-	6	11	(4)	-	-
10	Edmund Bruggmann	Switzerland	32		1	-	-	-	-	25	-	6	-
11	Dumeng Giovanoli	Switzerland	31	(19)	8	8	15	-	(4)	(4)	-	(3)	(8)
12	Peter Frei	Switzerland	26		-	15	-	8	3	-	-	-	-
13	Rick Chaffee	United States	24		-	-	-	2	-	-	11	-	11
14	Andreas Sprecher	Switzerland	18	(1)	-	(1)	-	-	-	6	6	-	6
15	Andrzej Bachleda	Poland	10		-	-	-	-	-	8	2	-	-
16	Henri Duvillard	France	9		-	4	-	3	-	-	-	2	-
17	Rune Lindström	Sweden	8		-	-	-	-	8	-	-	-	-
	Håkon Mjøen	Norway	8		4	-	2	-	2	-	-	-	-
19	Claudio de Tasis	Italy	7		-	6	-	1	-	-	-	-	-
20	Francisco Fernández Ochoa	Spain	6		-	-	-	6	-	-	-	-	-
21	Jean-Pierre Augert	France	5		-	3	-	-	-	2	-	-	-
	Olle Rolén	Sweden	5		2	-	-	-	1	-	-	-	2
23	Franz Digruber	Austria	4		-	-	-	4	-	-	-	-	-
	Lasse Hamre	Norway	4		-	-	-	-	-	-	-	-	4
25	Heinrich Messner	Austria	3		-	2	-	-	-	-	-	-	1
	Guy Périllat	France	3		-	-	3	-	-	-	-	-	-
	Hank Kashiwa	United States	3		-	-	-	-	-	-	-	-	3
28	Bengt-Erik Grahn	Sweden	1		-	-	-	-	-	1	-	-	-
	Harald Roffner	Austria	1		-	-	-	-	-	-	-	1	-

Alpine skiing World Cup
Men

Overall | Downhill | Giant slalom | Slalom

1969
