= 1968 Alpine Skiing World Cup – Men's giant slalom =

1968 Men's giant slalom World Cup
Previous: 1967	Next: 1969

Men's giant slalom World Cup 1967/1968

== Calendar ==
Round	Race No	Place	Country	Date	Winner	Second	Third
1	1	Hindelang	West Germany	January 4, 1968	(Switzerland) Edmund Bruggmann	(France) Jean-Claude Killy	(Switzerland) Dumeng Giovanoli
2	2	Adelboden	Switzerland	January 8, 1968	(France) Jean-Claude Killy	(Switzerland) Edmund Bruggmann	(Switzerland) Stefan Kälin
3	8	Grenoble	France	February 12, 1968	(France) Jean-Claude Killy	(Switzerland) Willy Favre	(Austria) Heinrich Messner
4	11	Oslo	Norway	February 24, 1968	(Austria) Werner Bleiner	(Switzerland) Dumeng Giovanoli	(Switzerland) Edmund Bruggmann
5	14	Méribel	France	March 10, 1968	(France) Jean-Claude Killy	(France) Georges Mauduit	(France) Guy Périllat
6	18	Rossland	Canada	March 31, 1968	(Austria) Herbert Huber	(Austria) Reinhard Tritscher	(France) Guy Périllat
7	19	Heavenly Valley	United States	April 6, 1968	(Austria) Herbert Huber	(France) Georges Mauduit	(Austria) Reinhard Tritscher

Note: Round 3/Race 8 was the Olympic event, which counts also for the World Cup. See also 1968 Winter Olympics and Alpine skiing at the 1968 Winter Olympics

== Final point standings ==
In men's giant slalom World Cup 1967/68 the best 3 results count. Deductions are given in ().

Place	Name	Country	Total points	Deduction	1 (Germany)	2 (Switzerland)	8 (France)	11 (Norway)	14 (France)	18 (Canada)	19 (United States)
1	Jean-Claude Killy	France	75	(22)	(20)	25	25	-	25	(2)	-
2	Edmund Bruggmann	Switzerland	60	(6)	25	20	-	15	-	(6)	-
3	Herbert Huber	Austria	52		-	2	-	-	-	25	25
4	Georges Mauduit	France	51	(3)	(1)	-	(2)	-	20	11	20
5	Dumeng Giovanoli	Switzerland	43	(11)	15	(6)	(4)	20	-	8	(1)
6	Guy Périllat	France	41	(6)	-	-	11	-	15	15	(6)
7	Reinhard Tritscher	Austria	35		-	-	-	-	-	20	15
8	Billy Kidd	United States	30		11	11	8	-	-	-	-
9	Willy Favre	Switzerland	28		4	4	20	-	-	-	-
	Werner Bleiner	Austria	28		2	1	-	25	-	-	-
11	Karl Schranz	Austria	22		8	8	6	-	-	-	-
12	Stefan Kälin	Switzerland	16		-	15	-	1	-	-	-
13	Heinrich Messner	Austria	15		-	-	15	-	-	-	-
14	Jean-Pierre Augert	France	14		-	-	-	-	-	3	11
15	Håkon Mjøen	Norway	11		-	-	-	11	-	-	-
	Miroslav Pažout	Czechoslovakia	11		-	-	-	-	11	-	-
17	Gerhard Nenning	Austria	10		3	-	3	-	-	4	-
18	Jakob Tischhauser	Switzerland	8		-	-	-	8	-	-	-
	Sepp Heckelmiller	West Germany	8		-	-	-	-	8	-	-
	Rick Chaffee	United States	8		-	-	-	-	-	-	8
21	Kurt Huggler	Switzerland	6		6	-	-	-	-	-	-
	Josef Loidl	Austria	6		-	-	-	6	-	-	-
	Josef Pechtl	Austria	6		-	-	-	-	6	-	-
	Patrick Russel	France	6		-	-	-	2	-	-	4
25	Bjarne Strand	Norway	4		-	-	-	4	-	-	-
	Peter Frei	Switzerland	4		-	-	-	-	4	-	-
27	Kurt Schneider	Switzerland	3		-	3	-	-	-	-	-
	Gerhardt Riml	Austria	3		-	-	-	3	-	-	-
	Jean-Luc Pinel	France	3		-	-	-	-	3	-	-
	Gerhard Mussner	Italy	3		-	-	-	-	-	-	3
31	Jeremy Palmer-Tomkinson	United Kingdom	2		-	-	-	-	2	-	-
	Bernard Orcel	France	2		-	-	-	-	-	-	2
33	Jimmy Heuga	United States	1		-	-	1	-	-	-	-
	Michel Bozon	France	1		-	-	-	-	1	-	-
	Alfred Matt	Austria	1		-	-	-	-	-	1	-

Alpine Skiing World Cup
Men

Overall | Downhill | Giant slalom | Slalom

1968
