= 1968 Alpine Skiing World Cup – Men's slalom =

1968 Men's slalom World Cup
Previous: 1967	Next: 1969

Men's slalom World Cup 1967/1968

== Calendar ==
Round	Race No	Place	Country	Date	Winner	Second	Third
1	4	Wengen	Switzerland	January 14, 1968	(Switzerland) Dumeng Giovanoli	(Norway) Håkon Mjøen	(Austria) Alfred Matt
2	6	Kitzbühel	Austria	January 21, 1968	(Switzerland) Dumeng Giovanoli	(Austria) Alfred Matt	(France) Jean-Claude Killy
3	9	Grenoble	France	February 17, 1968	(France) Jean-Claude Killy	(Austria) Herbert Huber	(Austria) Alfred Matt
4	12	Oslo	Norway	February 25, 1968	(France) Patrick Russel	(Switzerland) Dumeng Giovanoli	(Norway) Håkon Mjøen
5	13	Kranjska Gora	Yugoslavia	March 1, 1968	(France) Patrick Russel	(Austria) Franz Digruber	(Switzerland) Stefan Kälin
6	16	Aspen	United States	March 16, 1968	(United States) Billy Kidd	(Austria) Herbert Huber	(Austria) Alfred Matt
7	17	Rossland	Canada	March 29, 1968	(France) Jean-Claude Killy	(France) Jean-Pierre Augert	(United States) Rick Chaffee
8	20	Heavenly Valley	United States	April 7, 1968	(United States) Spider Sabich	(Austria) Herbert Huber	(United States) Rick Chaffee

Note: Round 3/Race 9 was the Olympic event, which counts also for the World Cup. See also 1968 Winter Olympics and Alpine skiing at the 1968 Winter Olympics

== Final point standings ==
In 1968, only the best three results counted; deductions are given in ().
Points were only awarded for top ten finishes (see scoring system).

Place	Name	Country	Total points	Deduction	4 (Switzerland)	6 (Austria)	9 (France)	12 (Norway)	13 (Socialist Federal Republic of Yugoslavia)	16 (United States)	17 (Canada)	20 (United States)
1	Dumeng Giovanoli	Switzerland	70	(11)	25	25	(11)	20	-	-	-	-
2	Jean-Claude Killy	France	65	(15)	-	15	25	-	-	(11)	25	(4)
3	Patrick Russel	France	61		-	-	-	25	25	-	-	11
4	Herbert Huber	Austria	60	(15)	(4)	(11)	20	-	-	20	-	20
5	Alfred Matt	Austria	50	(26)	15	20	15	-	-	(15)	(11)	-
6	Håkon Mjøen	Norway	41		20	6	-	15	-	-	-	-
7	Rick Chaffee	United States	38		-	(3)	(2)	8	-	-	15	15
8	Spider Sabich	United States	37	(3)	(3)	-	8	-	-	-	4	25
9	Jean-Pierre Augert	France	30		-	4	-	-	-	-	20	6
10	Billy Kidd	United States	26		1	-	-	-	-	25	-	-
11	Stefan Kälin	Switzerland	21		-	-	-	6	15	-	-	-
12	Franz Digruber	Austria	20		-	-	-	-	20	-	-	-
13	Gerhard Nenning	Austria	17		11	-	-	-	-	-	6	-
	Heinrich Messner	Austria	17		6	-	-	-	-	8	3	-
15	Andrzej Bachleda	Poland	14		-	-	6	-	-	-	8	-
16	Jimmy Heuga	United States	12		-	-	4	2	-	6	-	-
17	Rune Lindström	Sweden	11		-	-	-	11	-	-	-	-
	Norbert Wendner	Austria	11		-	-	-	-	11	-	-	-
19	Peter Frei	Switzerland	9		8	-	1	-	-	-	-	-
20	Karl Schranz	Austria	8		-	8	-	-	-	-	-	-
	Stefan Sodat	Austria	8		-	-	-	-	8	-	-	-
	Reinhard Tritscher	Austria	8		-	-	-	-	-	-	-	8
23	Georges Mauduit	France	6		-	-	-	4	-	-	-	2
24	Peter Lakota	Yugoslavia	6		-	-	-	-	6	-	-	-
25	Alain Penz	France	5		2	-	3	-	-	-	-	-
	Guy Périllat	France	5		-	-	-	-	-	-	2	3
27	H. Hinterholzer	Austria	4		-	-	-	-	4	-	-	-
	Dennis McCoy	United States	4		-	-	-	-	-	4	-	-
29	Werner Bleiner	Austria	3		-	-	-	3	-	-	-	-
	R. Schaller	Austria	3		-	-	-	-	3	-	-	-
	Peter Duncan	Canada	3		-	-	-	-	-	3	-	-
	Edmund Bruggmann	Switzerland	3		-	-	-	-	-	2	1	-
33	Carlo Senoner	Italy	2		-	2	-	-	-	-	-	-
	Blaž Jakopič	Yugoslavia	2		-	-	-	-	2	-	-	-
	Robert Swan	Canada	2		-	-	-	-	-	1	-	1
36	Otto Tschudi	Norway	1		-	1	-	-	-	-	-	-
	Jon Terje Overland	Norway	1		-	-	-	1	-	-	-	-
	E. Wurner	Yugoslavia	1		-	-	-	-	1	-	-	-

Alpine Skiing World Cup
Men

Overall | Downhill | Giant slalom | Slalom

1968
