= 1968–69 FIS Alpine Ski World Cup =

International sports competition

FIS Alpine Ski World Cup 1968/69
Discipline	Men	Women
Overall	(Austria) Karl Schranz	(Austria) Gertrude Gabl
Downhill	(Austria) Karl Schranz	(Austria) Wiltrud Drexel
Giant slalom	(Austria) Karl Schranz	(United States) Marilyn Cochran
Slalom	(France) Patrick Russel (Austria) Alfred Matt (France) Alain Penz (France) Jean-Noël Augert	(Austria) Gertrude Gabl
Nations Cup	Austria	France
- Nations Cup overall: Austria

Competition
Locations	14	11
Individual	22	20

The third World Cup season began in December 1968 and concluded in March 1969. This was the first season in which the races began prior to 1 January, and that change immediately became permanent. Karl Schranz of Austria won the first of two consecutive overall titles. Gertrude Gabl of Austria won the women's overall title. For the first and only (as of 2016) time in World Cup history, a discipline trophy was shared by more than two people, as four men (three French, one Austrian) tied for the men's slalom trophy.

The race footage for the film Downhill Racer was shot during this season, primarily in January 1969.

== Calendar ==
=== Men ===
Event key: DH – Downhill, SL – Slalom, GS – Giant slalom
Race	Season	Date	Place	Type	Winner	Second	Third
38	1	12 December 1968	(France) Val d'Isère	GS _{013}	(Austria) Karl Schranz	(France) Bernard Orcel	(France) Henri Duvillard
39	2	3 January 1969	(West Germany) Berchtesgaden	SL _{016}	(Austria) Alfred Matt	(Austria) Karl Schranz	(France) Patrick Russel
40	3	6 January 1969	(Switzerland) Adelboden	GS _{014}	(France) Jean-Noël Augert	(France) Jean-Pierre Augert	(Austria) Karl Schranz
41	4	11 January 1969	(Switzerland) Wengen	DH _{011}	(Austria) Karl Schranz	(Austria) Heinrich Messner	(Austria) Karl Cordin
42	5	12 January 1969	(Switzerland) Wengen	SL _{017}	(Austria) Reinhard Tritscher	(United States) Spider Sabich	(Switzerland) Peter Frei
43	6	18 January 1969	(Austria) Kitzbühel	DH _{012}	(Austria) Karl Schranz	(Switzerland) Jean-Daniel Dätwyler	(Austria) Karl Cordin (France) Henri Duvillard
44	7	19 January 1969	(Austria) Kitzbühel	SL _{018}	(France) Patrick Russel	(Austria) Herbert Huber	(Switzerland) Dumeng Giovanoli
45	8	24 January 1969	(France) Megève	DH _{013}	(France) Henri Duvillard	(Austria) Heinrich Messner	(Austria) Alfred Matt
46	9	26 January 1969	(France) Megève	SL _{019}	(France) Alain Penz	(Austria) Herbert Huber	(United States) Spider Sabich
47	10	1 February 1969	(Austria) St. Anton	DH _{014}	(Austria) Karl Schranz	(Austria) Heinrich Messner	(West Germany) Franz Vogler
48	11	8 February 1969	(Sweden) Åre	GS _{015}	(France) Jean-Noël Augert	(Switzerland) Jakob Tischhauser	(France) Alain Penz
49	12	9 February 1969	(Sweden) Åre	SL _{020}	(France) Patrick Russel	(France) Jean-Noël Augert	(Austria) Alfred Matt
50	13	9 February 1969	(Italy) Cortina d'Ampezzo	DH _{015}	(Switzerland) Josef Minsch	(France) Jean-Pierre Augert	(Switzerland) Hans Peter Rohr
51	14	14 February 1969	(Italy) Val Gardena	DH _{016}	(Switzerland) Jean-Daniel Dätwyler	(France) Henri Duvillard	(Austria) Rudi Sailer
52	15	16 February 1969	(Socialist Federal Republic of Yugoslavia) Kranjska Gora	GS _{016}	(Austria) Reinhard Tritscher	(Austria) Alfred Matt	(Austria) Franz Digruber
53	16	17 February 1969	(Socialist Federal Republic of Yugoslavia) Kranjska Gora	SL _{021}	(Switzerland) Edmund Bruggmann	(France) Alain Penz	(Austria) Herbert Huber
54	17	28 February 1969	(United States) Squaw Valley	SL _{022}	(United States) Billy Kidd	(France) Alain Penz	(France) Patrick Russel
55	18	1 March 1969	(United States) Squaw Valley	GS _{017}	(Austria) Reinhard Tritscher	(Switzerland) Jakob Tischhauser	(Austria) Heinrich Messner
56	19	15 March 1969	(Canada) Mont St. Anne	GS _{018}	(Austria) Karl Schranz	(Switzerland) Dumeng Giovanoli	(Switzerland) Jakob Tischhauser
57	20	16 March 1969	(Canada) Mont St. Anne	SL _{023}	(Austria) Alfred Matt	(France) Jean-Noël Augert	(United States) Billy Kidd
58	21	21 March 1969	(United States) Waterville Valley	GS _{019}	(Switzerland) Dumeng Giovanoli	(Austria) Karl Schranz	(Switzerland) Jakob Tischhauser
59	22	22 March 1969	(United States) Waterville Valley	SL _{024}	(France) Jean-Noël Augert	(Austria) Herbert Huber	(France) Patrick Russel

Note: Race 12 and 13 were held on the same day.

=== Women ===
Event key: DH – Downhill, SL – Slalom, GS – Giant slalom
Race	Season	Date	Place	Type	Winner	Second	Third
41	1	11 December 1968	(France) Val d'Isère	GS _{014}	(France) Françoise Macchi	(West Germany) Rosi Mittermaier	(France) Annie Famose
42	2	3 January 1969	(West Germany) Oberstaufen	GS _{015}	(United States) Kiki Cutter	(Austria) Gertrude Gabl (Austria) Olga Pall	
43	3	4 January 1969	(West Germany) Oberstaufen	SL _{018}	(Austria) Gertrude Gabl	(United States) Judy Nagel	(United States) Marilyn Cochran
44	4	7 January 1969	(Switzerland) Grindelwald	SL _{019}	(Austria) Gertrude Gabl	(France) Annie Famose	(United States) Kiki Cutter
45	5	10 January 1969	(Switzerland) Grindelwald	DH _{011}	(Austria) Wiltrud Drexel	(West Germany) Rosi Mittermaier	(France) Isabelle Mir
46	6	15 January 1969	(Austria) Schruns	DH _{012}	(Austria) Wiltrud Drexel	(France) Florence Steurer	(France) Annie Famose
47	7	16 January 1969	(Austria) Schruns	SL _{020}	(West Germany) Rosi Mittermaier	(Austria) Gertrude Gabl	(United States) Kiki Cutter
48	8	23 January 1969	(France) St. Gervais	SL _{021}	(France) Ingrid Lafforgue	(France) Annie Famose	(United States) Judy Nagel
49	9	25 January 1969	(France) St. Gervais	DH _{013}	(France) Isabelle Mir	(France) Annie Famose (Austria) Annemarie Pröll	
50	10	31 January 1969	(Austria) St. Anton	DH _{014}	(Austria) Olga Pall	(France) Isabelle Mir	(Austria) Wiltrud Drexel
51	11	8 February 1969	(Italy) Sterzing	SL _{022}	(United States) Judy Nagel	(United States) Cathy Nagel	(France) Florence Steurer
52	12	9 February 1969	(Italy) Sterzing	GS _{016}	(France) Michèle Jacot	(United States) Marilyn Cochran	(France) Ingrid Lafforgue
53	13	16 February 1969	(Czechoslovakia) Vysoké Tatry	SL _{023}	(Austria) Gertrude Gabl	(United States) Kiki Cutter	(France) Ingrid Lafforgue
54	14	17 February 1969	(Czechoslovakia) Vysoké Tatry	GS _{017}	(Austria) Gertrude Gabl	(United States) Marilyn Cochran	(France) Florence Steurer
55	15	28 February 1969	(United States) Squaw Valley	SL _{024}	(Austria) Bernadette Rauter	(France) Ingrid Lafforgue	(United States) Judy Nagel
56	16	1 March 1969	(United States) Squaw Valley	GS _{018}	(France) Florence Steurer	(United States) Marilyn Cochran	(Austria) Bernadette Rauter
57	17	14 March 1969	(Canada) Mont St. Anne	GS _{019}	(France) Michèle Jacot	(United States) Marilyn Cochran	(Austria) Wiltrud Drexel
58	18	15 March 1969	(Canada) Mont St. Anne	SL _{025}	(United States) Kiki Cutter	(France) Ingrid Lafforgue	(France) Florence Steurer
59	19	20 March 1969	(United States) Waterville Valley	GS _{020}	(Austria) Bernadette Rauter	(United States) Marilyn Cochran (United States) Karen Budge	
60	20	22 March 1969	(United States) Waterville Valley	SL _{026}	(United States) Kiki Cutter	(West Germany) Rosi Mittermaier	(United States) Judy Nagel

== Men ==
=== Overall ===
In men's overall World Cup 1968/69 the best three downhills, best three giant slaloms and best three slaloms count. 17 racers had a point deduction.

Place	Name	Country	Total	DH	GS	SL
1	Karl Schranz	Austria	182	75	70	37
2	Jean-Noël Augert	France	123	0	58	65
3	Reinhard Tritscher	Austria	108	0	61	47
4	Alfred Matt	Austria	104	19	20	65
5	Alain Penz	France	98	1	32	65
6	Henri Duvillard	France	91	60	22	9
7	Heinrich Messner	Austria	89	60	26	3
8	Patrick Russel	France	80	0	15	65
9	Dumeng Giovanoli	Switzerland	79	0	48	31
10	Herbert Huber	Austria	62	0	2	60
11	Spider Sabich	United States	58	3	12	43
12	Jean-Daniel Dätwyler	Switzerland	56	56	0	0
13	Jakob Tischhauser	Switzerland	55	0	55	0
	Billy Kidd	United States	55	0	15	40
15	Jean-Pierre Augert	France	49	24	20	5

=== Downhill ===
see complete table

In men's downhill World Cup 1968/69 the best 3 results count. Karl Schranz won the cup with maximum points.

Place	Name	Country	Total	4 (Switzerland)	6 (Austria)	8 (France)	10 (Austria)	13 (Italy)	14 (Italy)
1	Karl Schranz	Austria	75	25	25	–	25	–	–
2	Heinrich Messner	Austria	60	20	–	20	20	–	(3)
	Henri Duvillard	France	60	–	15	25	(6)	(6)	20
4	Jean-Daniel Dätwyler	Switzerland	56	11	20	(11)	(11)	(2)	25
5	Josef Minsch	Switzerland	44	8	–	(3)	(4)	25	11
6	Karl Cordin	Austria	41	15	15	–	–	11	(8)
7	Rudi Sailer	Austria	31	–	(6)	–	8	8	15
8	Jean-Pierre Augert	France	24	4	–	–	–	20	–
9	Alfred Matt	Austria	19	–	2	15	2	–	–
10	Hans Peter Rohr	Switzerland	17	–	–	–	–	15	2

=== Giant slalom ===
see complete table

In men's giant slalom World Cup 1968/69 the best 3 results count. Four racers had a point deduction, which are given in ().

Place	Name	Country	Total	1 (France)	3 (Switzerland)	11 (Sweden)	15 (Socialist Federal Republic of Yugoslavia)	18 (United States)	19 (Canada)	21 (United States)
1	Karl Schranz	Austria	70	25	(15)	–	(6)	(11)	25	20
2	Reinhard Tritscher	Austria	61	–	11	–	25	25	(3)	–
3	Jean-Noël Augert	France	58	–	25	25	–	–	–	8
4	Jakob Tischhauser	Switzerland	55	–	(4)	20	–	20	15	(15)
5	Dumeng Giovanoli	Switzerland	48	–	–	–	3	–	20	25
6	Alain Penz	France	32	6	–	15	–	(3)	(4)	11
7	Bernard Orcel	France	26	20	6	–	–	–	–	–
	Heinrich Messner	Austria	26	–	–	–	–	15	11	–
9	Henri Duvillard	France	22	15	–	–	–	–	6	1
10	Jean-Pierre Augert	France	20	–	20	–	–	–	–	–
	Alfred Matt	Austria	20	–	–	–	20	–	–	–

=== Slalom ===
see complete table

In men's slalom World Cup 1968/69 the best 3 results count. The one and only World Cup ever shared by more than two racers. Three French athletes tied with one Austrian.

Place	Name	Country	Total	2 (Germany)	5 (Switzerland)	7 (Austria)	9 (France)	12 (Sweden)	16 (Socialist Federal Republic of Yugoslavia)	17 (United States)	20 (Canada)	22 (United States)
1	Patrick Russel	France	65	15	–	25	–	25	–	(15)	(11)	(15)
	Alfred Matt	Austria	65	25	(11)	(1)	–	15	–	–	25	–
	Alain Penz	France	65	(6)	–	(8)	25	–	20	20	–	–
	Jean-Noël Augert	France	65	–	–	(6)	–	20	–	–	20	25
5	Herbert Huber	Austria	60	(3)	–	20	20	(11)	(15)	(8)	(4)	20
6	Reinhard Tritscher	Austria	47	11	25	11	(11)	–	–	(3)	–	–
7	Spider Sabich	United States	43	–	20	(4)	15	–	(3)	(1)	8	–
8	Billy Kidd	United States	40	–	–	–	–	–	–	25	15	–
9	Karl Schranz	Austria	37	20	–	–	–	6	11	(4)	–	–
10	Edmund Bruggmann	Switzerland	32	1	–	–	–	–	25	–	6	–

== Women ==
=== Overall ===
In women's overall World Cup 1968/69 the best three downhills, best three giant slaloms and best three slaloms count. 15 racers had a point deduction.

Place	Name	Country	Total	DH	GS	SL
1	Gertrude Gabl	Austria	131	3	53	75
2	Florence Steurer	France	112	20	51	41
3	Wiltrud Drexel	Austria	111	65	34	12
4	Kiki Cutter	United States	107	0	37	70
5	Ingrid Lafforgue	France	103	6	32	65
6	Annie Famose	France	101	35	15	51
7	Rosi Mittermaier	West Germany	98	20	27	51
8	Michèle Jacot	France	92	19	56	17
9	Isabelle Mir	France	86	60	17	9
10	Judy Nagel	United States	85	3	22	60
11	Bernadette Rauter	Austria	82	0	41	41
12	Marilyn Cochran	United States	76	1	60	15
13	Olga Pall	Austria	61	36	23	2
14	Karen Budge	United States	40	9	31	0
15	Françoise Macchi	France	38	8	30	0

=== Downhill ===
see complete table

In women's downhill World Cup 1968/69 the best 3 results count. Three racers had a point deduction, which are given in ().

Place	Name	Country	Total	5 (Switzerland)	6 (Austria)	9 (France)	10 (Austria)
1	Wiltrud Drexel	Austria	65	25	25	(3)	15
2	Isabelle Mir	France	60	15	(11)	25	20
3	Olga Pall	Austria	36	–	–	11	25
4	Annie Famose	France	35	–	15	20	–
5	Rosi Mittermaier	West Germany	20	20	–	–	–
	Florence Steurer	France	20	–	20	–	–
	Annemarie Pröll	Austria	20	–	–	20	–
8	Michèle Jacot	France	19	11	4	4	(3)
9	Giustina Demetz	Italy	14	3	–	–	11
10	Erica Skinger	United States	10	2	8	–	–
	Annerösli Zryd	Switzerland	10	–	6	–	4

=== Giant slalom ===
see complete table

In women's giant slalom World Cup 1968/69 the best 3 results counted. Eight racers had a point deduction, which are given in (). Marilyn Cochran won the cup without a win, but was runner-up in the final five races.

Place	Name	Country	Total	1 (France)	2 (Germany)	12 (Italy)	14 (Czechoslovakia)	16 (United States)	17 (Canada)	19 (United States)
1	Marilyn Cochran	United States	60	–	(1)	20	20	20	(20)	(20)
2	Michèle Jacot	France	56	–	–	25	6	–	25	(2)
3	Gertrude Gabl	Austria	53	–	20	–	25	8	–	(6)
4	Florence Steurer	France	51	–	–	–	15	25	(4)	11
5	Bernadette Rauter	Austria	41	1	–	–	–	15	–	25
6	Kiki Cutter	United States	37	–	25	6	–	–	6	(4)
7	Wiltrud Drexel	Austria	34	(3)	8	–	–	11	15	(8)
8	Ingrid Lafforgue	France	32	–	11	15	(4)	6	–	–
9	Karen Budge	United States	31	–	–	–	8	–	3	20
10	Françoise Macchi	France	30	25	4	–	–	–	1	–

=== Slalom ===
see complete table

In women's slalom World Cup 1968/69 the best 3 results count. 11 racers had a point deduction, which are given in (). Gertrude Gabl won the cup with maximum points.

Place	Name	Country	Total	3 (Germany)	4 (Switzerland)	7 (Austria)	8 (France)	11 (Italy)	13 (Czechoslovakia)	15 (United States)	18 (Canada)	20 (United States)
1	Gertrude Gabl	Austria	75	25	25	(20)	(2)	–	25	–	–	–
2	Kiki Cutter	United States	70	(4)	(15)	(15)	(4)	–	20	–	25	25
3	Ingrid Lafforgue	France	65	(2)	(1)	(3)	25	(8)	(15)	20	20	(11)
4	Judy Nagel	United States	60	20	(11)	–	15	25	–	(15)	–	(15)
5	Annie Famose	France	51	11	20	(11)	20	–	–	–	–	–
	Rosi Mittermaier	West Germany	51	–	6	25	–	–	(6)	–	–	20
7	Florence Steurer	France	41	(3)	(4)	–	(3)	15	11	–	15	(6)
	Bernadette Rauter	Austria	41	–	–	–	–	–	8	25	8	–
9	Cathy Nagel	United States	37	6	–	–	11	20	–	–	–	–
10	Barbara Ann Cochran	United States	27	–	–	8	8	(3)	–	–	11	(3)

== Nations Cup ==
=== Overall ===
Place	Country	Total	Men	Ladies
1	Austria	1291	776	515
2	France	1217	580	637
3	United States	678	157	521
4	Switzerland	494	445	49
5	West Germany	138	25	113
6	Italy	75	46	29
7	Canada	39	14	25
8	United Kingdom	32	0	32
9	Sweden	22	22	0
10	Poland	12	12	0
	Norway	12	12	0
12	Spain	6	6	0

=== Men ===
Place	Country	Total	DH	GS	SL	Racers	Wins
1	Austria	776	244	244	288	11	10
2	France	580	114	193	273	10	7
3	Switzerland	445	172	146	127	11	4
4	United States	157	3	33	121	5	1
5	Italy	46	3	32	11	6	0
6	West Germany	25	17	8	0	3	0
7	Sweden	22	0	8	14	3	0
8	Canada	14	13	0	1	3	0
9	Poland	12	0	2	10	1	0
	Norway	12	0	0	12	2	0
11	Spain	6	0	0	6	1	0

=== Women ===
Place	Country	Total	DH	GS	SL	Racers	Wins
1	France	637	162	213	262	8	6
2	United States	521	23	198	300	9	4
3	Austria	515	142	192	181	9	9
4	West Germany	113	20	35	58	3	1
5	Switzerland	49	10	20	19	2	0
6	United Kingdom	32	0	15	17	2	0
7	Italy	29	14	4	11	4	0
8	Canada	25	15	2	8	2	0

== Medal table ==
Rank	Nation	Gold	Silver	Bronze	Total
1	Austria	19	13	12	44
2	France	13	15	14	42
3	United States	5	10	8	23
4	Switzerland	4	4	5	13
5	Germany	1	3	1	5
Totals (5 entries)		42	45	40	127
