= 1969 Alpine Skiing World Cup – Men's downhill =

1969 Men's downhill World Cup
Previous: 1968	Next: 1970

Men's downhill World Cup 1968/1969

== Final point standings ==
The best three results count. Deductions are given in parentheses.

Place	Name	Country	Total points	Deduction	4 (Switzerland)	6 (Austria)	8 (France)	10 (Austria)	13 (Italy)	14 (Italy)
1	Karl Schranz	Austria	75		25	25	-	25	-	-
2	Heinrich Messner	Austria	60	(3)	20	-	20	20	-	(3)
	Henri Duvillard	France	60	(12)	-	15	25	(6)	(6)	20
4	Jean-Daniel Dätwyler	Switzerland	56	(24)	11	20	(11)	(11)	(2)	25
5	Josef Minsch	Switzerland	44	(7)	8	-	(3)	(4)	25	11
6	Karl Cordin	Austria	41	(8)	15	15	-	-	11	(8)
7	Rudi Sailer	Austria	31	(6)	-	(6)	-	8	8	15
8	Jean-Pierre Augert	France	24		4	-	-	-	20	-
9	Alfred Matt	Austria	19		-	2	15	2	-	-
10	Hans Peter Rohr	Switzerland	17		-	-	-	-	15	2
11	Franz Vogler	West Germany	15		-	-	-	15	-	-
12	Andreas Sprecher	Switzerland	14		-	4	6	-	-	4
13	Guy Périllat	France	8		-	8	-	-	-	-
	Rod Hebron	Canada	8		-	-	8	-	-	-
15	Bernard Orcel	France	6		6	-	-	-	-	-
	Kurt Huggler	Switzerland	6		-	-	-	-	-	6
17	Keith Shepard	Canada	5		-	-	4	-	1	-
18	Hans Zingre	Switzerland	4		3	-	-	1	-	-
	Gerhard Mussner	Italy	4		-	-	-	-	4	-
20	Roger Rossat-Mignod	France	3		-	3	-	-	-	-
	Spider Sabich	United States	3		-	-	-	3	-	-
	Dennis McCoy	United States	3		-	-	-	-	3	-
23	Willi Lesch	West Germany	2		2	-	-	-	-	-
	Michele Stefani	Italy	2		-	-	2	-	-	-
25	Gerhard Nenning	Austria	1		1	-	-	-	-	-
	Gerry Rinaldi	Canada	1		-	1	-	-	-	-
	Alain Penz	France	1		-	-	1	-	-	-
	Helmuth Schmalzl	Italy	1		-	-	-	-	-	1

Alpine Skiing World Cup
Men

Overall | Downhill | Giant slalom | Slalom

1969
