= Schlossberg (ski course) =

Ski course in Austria

Coordinates: 46.83°N 12.752778°E

- Interactive map of Schlossberg
- Location within Austria
- Location: Lienz, Tyrol, Austria
- Mountain: Lienz Dolomites
- Opened: 1969

Giant slalom
- Start: 1,008 m (3,307 ft) (AA)
- Finish: 680 m (2,231 ft)
- Vertical drop: 328 m (1,076 ft)
- Length: 1,300 m (0.808 mi)
- Max incline: 25.2 degrees (47%)
- Avg incline: 13 degrees (23%)
- Min incline: 10.2 degrees (18%)
- Most Wins (W): (Sweden) Anja Pärson (2x) (Austria) Anna Fenninger (2x)

Slalom
- Start: 880 m (2,887 ft) (AA)
- Finish: 680 m (2,231 ft)
- Vertical drop: 200 m (656 ft)
- Length: 644 m (0.400 mi)
- Max incline: 25.2 degrees (47%)
- Avg incline: 13 degrees (23%)
- Min incline: 10.2 degrees (18%)
- Most Wins (W): (Austria) Marlies Schild (4x)

Schlossberg is a World Cup technical ski course in Austria on Lienz Dolomites above Lienz, Tyrol. The race course debuted in 1969 and is part of Hochstein Ski Resort.

Schlossberg alternates with the Panorama course in Semmering in hosting women's technical events on the World Cup circuit. Events here have never yet been cancelled.

== World Cup ==
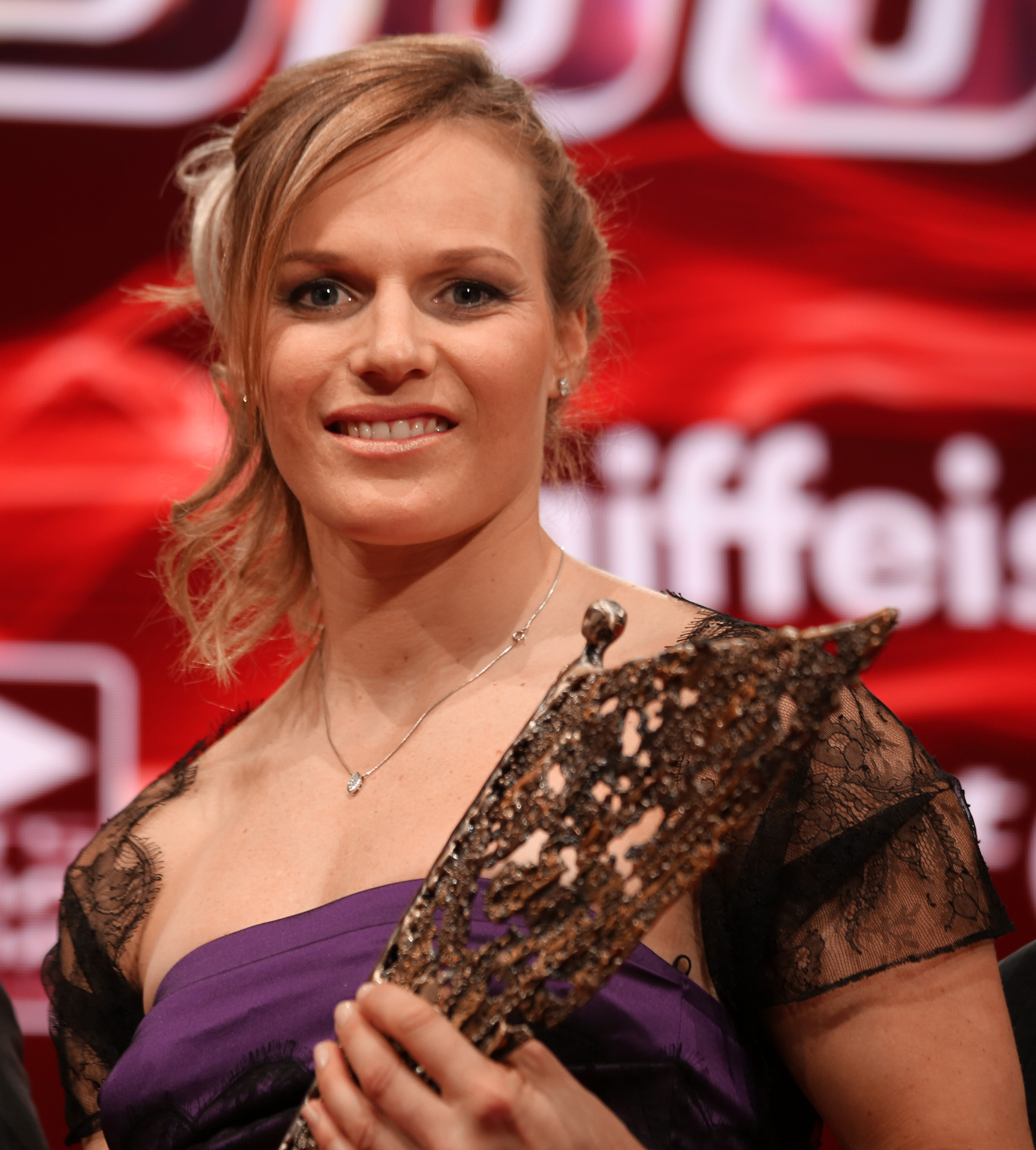
Marlies Schild won record 4 events in total (all in slalom)

This course hosted total of 28 World Cup events for women (16th of all-time) and 3 World Cup events for men (70th of all-time).

=== Men ===
No.	Type	Season	Date	Winner	Second	Third
62	GS	1969/70	20 December 1969	(France) Patrick Russel	(Italy) Gustav Thöni	(Switzerland) Jakob Tischhauser
63	SL	1969/70	21 December 1969	(France) Jean-Noël Augert	(Austria) Herbert Huber	(United States) Spider Sabich
.613.	SL	1987/88	12 January 1988	(Austria) Bernhard Gstrein	(Italy) Alberto Tomba	(Sweden) Jonas Nilsson

=== Women ===
No.	Type	Season	Date	Winner	Second	Third
63	GS	1969/70	19 December 1969	(United States) Judy Nagel	(France) Michèle Jacot	(United States) Barbara Ann Cochran
64	SL	1969/70	20 December 1969	(United States) Judy Nagel	(France) Ingrid Lafforgue	(Austria) Bernadette Rauter
882	SL	1997/98	27 December 1997	(Sweden) Ylva Nowén	(Italy) Deborah Compagnoni	(Slovenia) Urška Hrovat
883	SL	1997/98	28 December 1997	(Sweden) Ylva Nowén	(United States) Kristina Koznick	(Italy) Deborah Compagnoni
950	GS	1999/00	28 December 1999	(Austria) Anita Wachter	(Canada) Allison Forsyth	(Liechtenstein) Birgit Heeb
951	SL	1999/00	29 December 1999	(Austria) Sabine Egger	(Slovenia) Nataša Bokal	(Austria) Karin Köllerer
1022	GS	2001/02	28 December 2001	(Sweden) Anja Pärson	(Germany) Monika Bergmann (United States) Kristina Koznick	
1023	SL	2001/02	29 December 2001	(Switzerland) Lilian Kummer	(Italy) Karen Putzer	(Sweden) Ylva Nowén (Sweden) Anja Pärson
1088	GS	2003/04	28 December 2003	(Austria) Nicole Hosp	(Austria) Renate Götschl	(United States) Kirsten Clark
1089	SL	2003/04	29 December 2003	(Sweden) Anja Pärson	(Austria) Nicole Hosp	(Germany) Monika Bergmann
1157	GS	2005/06	28 December 2005	(Sweden) Anja Pärson	(Austria) Nicole Hosp	(Slovenia) Tina Maze
1158	SL	2005/06	29 December 2005	(Austria) Marlies Schild	(Austria) Nicole Hosp	(Croatia) Janica Kostelić
1229	GS	2007/08	28 December 2007	(Italy) Denise Karbon	(United States) Julia Mancuso	(Italy) Nicole Gius
1230	SL	2007/08	29 December 2007	(Italy) Chiara Costazza	(Austria) Nicole Hosp	(Finland) Tanja Poutiainen
1297	GS	2009/10	28 December 2009	(Germany) Kathrin Hölzl	(Italy) Manuela Mölgg	(France) Taïna Barioz
1298	SL	2009/10	29 December 2009	(Austria) Marlies Schild	(France) Sandrine Aubert	(Austria) Kathrin Zettel
1360	GS	2011/12	28 December 2011	(Austria) Anna Fenninger	(Italy) Federica Brignone	(France) Tessa Worley
1361	SL	2011/12	29 December 2011	(Austria) Marlies Schild	(Slovenia) Tina Maze	(United States) Mikaela Shiffrin
1436	GS	2013/14	28 December 2013	(Austria) Anna Fenninger	(Sweden) Jessica Lindell-Vikarby	(United States) Mikaela Shiffrin
1437	SL	2013/14	29 December 2013	(Austria) Marlies Schild	(United States) Mikaela Shiffrin	(Germany) Maria Höfl-Riesch
1499	GS	2015/16	28 December 2015	(Switzerland) Lara Gut	(Liechtenstein) Tina Weirather	(Germany) Viktoria Rebensburg
1500	SL	2015/16	29 December 2015	(Sweden) Frida Hansdotter	(Switzerland) Wendy Holdener	(Slovakia) Petra Vlhová
1576	SL	2017/18	28 December 2017	(United States) Mikaela Shiffrin	(Switzerland) Wendy Holdener	(Sweden) Frida Hansdotter
1577	GS	2017/18	29 December 2017	(Italy) Federica Brignone	(Germany) Viktoria Rebensburg	(United States) Mikaela Shiffrin
1647	GS	2019/20	28 December 2019	(United States) Mikaela Shiffrin	(Italy) Marta Bassino	(Austria) Katharina Liensberger
1648	SL	2019/20	29 December 2019	(United States) Mikaela Shiffrin	(Slovakia) Petra Vlhová	(Switzerland) Michelle Gisin
1712	GS	2021/22	28 December 2021	(France) Tessa Worley	(Slovakia) Petra Vlhová	(Sweden) Sara Hector
1713	SL	2021/22	29 December 2021	(Slovakia) Petra Vlhová	(Austria) Katharina Liensberger	(Switzerland) Michelle Gisin
1785	GS	2023/24	28 December 2023	(United States) Mikaela Shiffrin	(Italy) Federica Brignone	(Sweden) Sara Hector
1786	SL	2023/24	29 December 2023	(United States) Mikaela Shiffrin	(Germany) Lena Dürr	(Switzerland) Michelle Gisin

== Course sections ==
- SCL Kante, Russenweg, Gamsgangl, Jasdorferschuß, Bärental, Gribelekante, Schibrücke, Schlußhang
