= 1970–71 FIS Alpine Ski World Cup =

International sports competition

FIS Alpine Ski World Cup 1970/71
Discipline	Men	Women
Overall	(Italy) Gustav Thöni	(Austria) Annemarie Pröll
Downhill	(Switzerland) Bernhard Russi	(Austria) Annemarie Pröll
Giant slalom	(France) Patrick Russel (Italy) Gustav Thöni	(Austria) Annemarie Pröll
Slalom	(France) Jean-Noël Augert	(France) Britt Lafforgue (Canada) Betsy Clifford
Nations Cup	France	France
- Nations Cup overall: France

Competition
Locations	13	14
Individual	24	23

The 5th World Cup season began in December 1970 in Italy and concluded in March 1971 in Sweden. Gustav Thöni of Italy won the first of his three consecutive overall titles. Annemarie Pröll of Austria won the women's overall title, her first of five consecutive.

== Calendar ==
=== Men ===
Event key: DH – Downhill, SL – Slalom, GS – Giant slalom
Race	Season	Date	Place	Type	Winner	Second	Third
88	1	13 December 1970	(Italy) Sestriere	DH _{023}	(France) Henri Duvillard	(France) Bernard Orcel	(Austria) Karl Schranz
89	2	17 December 1970	(France) Val d'Isère	GS _{031}	(France) Patrick Russel	(France) Jean-Noël Augert	(Italy) Gustav Thöni
90	3	20 December 1970	(France) Val d'Isère	DH _{024}	(Austria) Karl Cordin	(France) Bernard Orcel	(Austria) Karl Schranz
91	4	5 January 1971	(West Germany) Berchtesgaden	GS _{032}	(Switzerland) Edmund Bruggmann	(France) Patrick Russel	(Austria) David Zwilling
92	5	6 January 1971	(West Germany) Berchtesgaden	SL _{036}	(France) Jean-Noël Augert	(Austria) Heinrich Messner	(West Germany) Max Rieger
93	6	9 January 1971	(Italy) Madonna di Campiglio	GS _{033}	(France) Henri Duvillard	(France) Patrick Russel	(Italy) Gustav Thöni
94	7	10 January 1971	(Italy) Madonna di Campiglio	SL _{037}	(Italy) Gustav Thöni	(France) Jean-Noël Augert	(France) Patrick Russel
95	8	16 January 1971	(Switzerland) St. Moritz	DH _{025}	(Switzerland) Walter Tresch	(Switzerland) Bernhard Russi	(Switzerland) Andreas Sprecher
96	9	17 January 1971	(Switzerland) St. Moritz	SL _{038}	(United States) Tyler Palmer	(Austria) Harald Rofner	(Italy) Gustav Thöni
97	10	18 January 1971	(Switzerland) Adelboden	GS _{034}	(France) Patrick Russel	(Italy) Gustav Thöni	(France) Henri Duvillard
98	11	24 January 1971	(Austria) Kitzbühel	SL _{039}	(France) Jean-Noël Augert	(France) Alain Penz	(Austria) Harald Rofner
99	12	29 January 1971	(France) Megève	DH _{026}	(Switzerland) Jean-Daniel Dätwyler	(France) Bernard Orcel	(Switzerland) Walter Tresch
100	13	30 January 1971	(France) Megève	SL _{040}	(France) Jean-Noël Augert	(Italy) Gustav Thöni	(West Germany) Christian Neureuther
101	14	31 January 1971	(France) Megève	DH _{027}	(Switzerland) Bernhard Russi	(West Germany) Franz Vogler	(Switzerland) Michael Dätwyler
102	15	7 February 1971	(Switzerland) Mürren	SL _{041}	(France) Jean-Noël Augert	(United States) Tyler Palmer	(France) Patrick Russel
103	16	13 February 1971	(Canada) Mont St. Anne	GS _{035}	(Switzerland) Bernhard Russi	(Switzerland) Edmund Bruggmann	(Austria) Werner Bleiner
104	17	14 February 1971	(Canada) Mont St. Anne	SL _{042}	(France) Patrick Russel	(Italy) Gustav Thöni	(France) Alain Penz
105	18	18 February 1971	(United States) Sugarloaf	DH _{028}	(Switzerland) Bernhard Russi	(France) Henri Duvillard	(Italy) Stefano Anzi
106	19	19 February 1971	(United States) Sugarloaf	DH _{029}	(Italy) Stefano Anzi	(Austria) Karl Cordin	(Italy) Gustav Thöni
107	20	21 February 1971	(United States) Sugarloaf	GS _{036}	(Italy) Gustav Thöni	(Switzerland) Edmund Bruggmann	(France) Henri Duvillard
108	21	25 February 1971	(United States) Heavenly Valley	SL _{043}	(Italy) Gustav Thöni	(West Germany) Christian Neureuther	(United States) Tyler Palmer
109	22	27 February 1971	(United States) Heavenly Valley	GS _{037}	(Italy) Gustav Thöni	(France) Henri Duvillard	(West Germany) Sepp Heckelmiller
110	23	13 March 1971	(Sweden) Åre	GS _{038}	(Austria) David Zwilling	(West Germany) Sepp Heckelmiller	(France) Patrick Russel
111	24	14 March 1971	(Sweden) Åre	SL _{044}	(France) Jean-Noël Augert	(Italy) Gustav Thöni	(Switzerland) Edmund Bruggmann

=== Ladies ===
Event key: DH – Downhill, SL – Slalom, GS – Giant slalom
Race	Season	Date	Place	Type	Winner	Second	Third
87	1	12 December 1970	(Italy) Bardonecchia	DH _{020}	(France) Françoise Macchi	(Austria) Annemarie Pröll	(France) Isabelle Mir
88	2	16 December 1970	(France) Val d'Isère	SL _{039}	(Canada) Betsy Clifford	(France) Florence Steurer	(Austria) Wiltrud Drexel
89	3	19 December 1970	(France) Val d'Isère	DH _{021}	(France) Isabelle Mir	(Austria) Wiltrud Drexel	(France) Michèle Jacot
90	4	4 January 1971	(Socialist Federal Republic of Yugoslavia) Maribor	SL _{040}	(Austria) Annemarie Pröll	(Austria) Bernadette Rauter	(United States) Barbara Ann Cochran
91	5	5 January 1971	(Socialist Federal Republic of Yugoslavia) Maribor	GS _{030}	(France) Françoise Macchi	(Austria) Gertrude Gabl	(Austria) Annemarie Pröll
92	6	8 January 1971	(West Germany) Oberstaufen	GS _{031}	(France) Michèle Jacot	(France) Britt Lafforgue	(France) Jocelyn Périllat
93	7	9 January 1971	(West Germany) Oberstaufen	SL _{041}	(France) Michèle Jacot	(Austria) Gertrude Gabl	(France) Jocelyn Périllat
94	8	14 January 1971	(Switzerland) Grindelwald	SL _{042}	(France) Britt Lafforgue	(France) Michèle Jacot	(France) Danièle Debernard
95	9	20 January 1971	(Austria) Schruns	DH _{022}	(France) Michèle Jacot	(France) Françoise Macchi	(Austria) Wiltrud Drexel
96	10	21 January 1971	(Austria) Schruns	SL _{043}	(Canada) Betsy Clifford	(France) Britt Lafforgue	(Austria) Wiltrud Drexel
97	11	28 January 1971	(France) Pra-Loup	DH _{023}	(Austria) Wiltrud Drexel	(Austria) Annemarie Pröll	(France) Jacqueline Rouvier
98	12	29 January 1971	(France) St. Gervais	SL _{044}	(Austria) Annemarie Pröll	(United States) Barbara Ann Cochran	(West Germany) Rosi Mittermaier
99	13	4 February 1971	(Switzerland) Mürren	SL _{045}	(France) Britt Lafforgue	(France) Florence Steurer	(France) Danièle Debernard
100	14	12 February 1971	(Canada) Mont St. Anne	GS _{032}	(France) Isabelle Mir	(France) Jacqueline Rouvier	(France) Françoise Macchi
101	15	13 February 1971	(Canada) Mont St. Anne	SL _{046}	(United States) Marilyn Cochran	(United States) Barbara Ann Cochran	(Austria) Wiltrud Drexel
102	16	18 February 1971	(United States) Sugarloaf	DH _{024}	(Austria) Annemarie Pröll	(France) Jacqueline Rouvier	(France) Isabelle Mir
103	17	19 February 1971	(United States) Sugarloaf	DH _{025}	(Austria) Annemarie Pröll	(France) Jacqueline Rouvier	(France) Annie Famose
104	18	20 February 1971	(United States) Sugarloaf	GS _{033}	(France) Michèle Jacot	(Austria) Annemarie Pröll	(West Germany) Rosi Mittermaier
105	19	24 February 1971	(United States) Heavenly Valley	SL _{047}	(United States) Barbara Ann Cochran	(Canada) Betsy Clifford	(Austria) Annemarie Pröll
106	20	26 February 1971	(United States) Heavenly Valley	GS _{034}	(United States) Barbara Ann Cochran	(United States) Karen Budge	(France) Isabelle Mir
107	21	10 March 1971	(Italy) Abetone	GS _{035}	(Austria) Annemarie Pröll	(France) Michèle Jacot	(France) Françoise Macchi
108	22	11 March 1971	(Italy) Abetone	GS _{036}	(Austria) Annemarie Pröll	(France) Françoise Macchi	(Austria) Gertrude Gabl
109	23	13 March 1971	(Sweden) Åre	GS _{037}	(Austria) Annemarie Pröll	(United States) Marilyn Cochran	(Austria) Gertrude Gabl

== Men ==
=== Overall ===
In men's overall World Cup 1970/71 the best three downhills, best three giant slaloms and best three slaloms count. 22 racers had a point deduction.

Place	Name	Country	Total	DH	GS	SL
1	Gustav Thöni	Italy	155	15	70	70
2	Henri Duvillard	France	135	53	60	22
3	Patrick Russel	France	125	0	70	55
4	Jean-Noël Augert	France	107	0	32	75
5	Bernhard Russi	Switzerland	95	70	25	0
6	Edmund Bruggmann	Switzerland	94	0	65	29
7	David Zwilling	Austria	86	2	51	33
8	Christian Neureuther	West Germany	66	0	25	41
9	Bernard Orcel	France	63	60	0	3
10	Tyler Palmer	United States	60	0	0	60
11	Karl Schranz	Austria	57	38	19	0
12	Karl Cordin	Austria	56	56	0	0
13	Walter Tresch	Switzerland	52	46	0	6
14	Harald Rofner	Austria	51	0	5	46
	Alain Penz	France	51	0	13	38

=== Downhill ===
In men's downhill World Cup 1970/71 the best 3 results count. Seven racers had a point deduction, which are given in ().

Place	Name	Country	Total	1 (Italy)	3 (France)	8 (Switzerland)	12 (France)	14 (France)	18 (United States)	19 (United States)
1	Bernhard Russi	Switzerland	70	(11)	(11)	20	(11)	25	25	(8)
2	Bernard Orcel	France	60	20	20	-	20	(11)	(4)	-
3	Karl Cordin	Austria	56	-	25	11	(6)	-	(6)	20
4	Henri Duvillard	France	53	25	8	(4)	-	(2)	20	(6)
5	Walter Tresch	Switzerland	46	6	-	25	15	-	(3)	-
6	Jean-Daniel Dätwyler	Switzerland	44	-	(4)	-	25	(6)	8	11
7	Stefano Anzi	Italy	40	-	-	-	-	-	15	25
8	Karl Schranz	Austria	38	15	15	-	8	(1)	-	(1)
9	Andreas Sprecher	Switzerland	25	8	-	15	-	-	2	-
	Franz Vogler	West Germany	25	3	-	-	-	20	-	2

=== Giant slalom ===
In men's giant slalom World Cup 1970/71 the best 3 results count. 12 racers had a point deduction, which are given in ().

Place	Name	Country	Total	2 (France)	4 (West Germany)	6 (Italy)	10 (Switzerland)	16 (Canada)	20 (United States)	22 (United States)	23 (Sweden)
1	Patrick Russel	France	70	25	20	(20)	25	-	(8)	-	(15)
	Gustav Thöni	Italy	70	(15)	-	(15)	20	(4)	25	25	(8)
3	Edmund Bruggmann	Switzerland	65	-	25	(8)	-	20	20	-	(3)
4	Henri Duvillard	France	60	(11)	-	25	15	(8)	(15)	20	-
5	David Zwilling	Austria	51	-	15	-	(1)	-	11	-	25
6	Sepp Heckelmiller	West Germany	46	(1)	11	-	(8)	-	-	15	20
7	Jean-Noël Augert	France	32	20	6	-	6	-	(3)	-	(1)
8	Bernhard Russi	Switzerland	25	-	-	-	-	25	-	-	-
	Werner Bleiner	Austria	25	4	-	6	(4)	15	-	-	-
	Christian Neureuther	West Germany	25	-	-	3	-	-	-	11	11

=== Slalom ===
In men's slalom World Cup 1970/71 the best 3 results count. 11 racers had a point deduction, which are given in (). Jean-Noël Augert won five races and won the cup with maximum points

Place	Name	Country	Total	5 (Germany)	7 (Italy)	9 (Switzerland)	11 (Austria)	13 (France)	15 (Switzerland)	17 (Canada)	21 (United States)	24 (Sweden)
1	Jean-Noël Augert	France	75	25	(20)	-	25	25	(25)	-	-	(25)
2	Gustav Thöni	Italy	70	-	25	(15)	-	20	-	(20)	25	(20)
3	Tyler Palmer	United States	60	(11)	-	25	-	(4)	20	-	15	(4)
4	Patrick Russel	France	55	-	15	-	-	-	15	25	-	-
5	Harald Rofner	Austria	46	-	11	20	15	-	-	-	-	-
6	Christian Neureuther	West Germany	41	-	6	(2)	(4)	15	-	-	20	-
7	Alain Penz	France	38	-	3	-	20	-	-	15	-	-
8	David Zwilling	Austria	33	-	(1)	11	11	-	-	(4)	11	(11)
9	Edmund Bruggmann	Switzerland	29	(4)	8	6	-	-	-	(6)	(3)	15
10	Rick Chaffee	United States	28	-	-	(3)	(1)	11	11	-	6	-

== Ladies ==
=== Overall ===
In women's overall World Cup 1970/71 the best three downhills, best three giant slaloms and best three slaloms count. 18 racers had a point deduction.

Place	Name	Country	Total	DH	GS	SL
1	Annemarie Pröll	Austria	210	70	75	65
2	Michèle Jacot	France	177	51	70	56
3	Isabelle Mir	France	133	55	48	30
4	Wiltrud Drexel	Austria	124	60	19	45
5	Françoise Macchi	France	122	56	60	6
6	Britt Lafforgue	France	112	0	42	70
7	Jacqueline Rouvier	France	101	55	42	4
8	Barbara Ann Cochran	United States	90	0	25	65
9	Gertrude Gabl	Austria	87	0	50	37
10	Betsy Clifford	Canada	76	0	6	70
11	Marilyn Cochran	United States	74	7	34	33
12	Bernadette Rauter	Austria	63	0	26	37
13	Florence Steurer	France	61	9	1	51
14	Rosi Mittermaier	West Germany	59	5	29	25
15	Annie Famose	France	45	29	2	10

=== Downhill ===
In women's downhill World Cup 1970/71 the best 3 results count. Eight racers had a point deduction, which are given in ().

Place	Name	Country	Total	1 (Italy)	3 (France)	9 (Austria)	11 (France)	16 (United States)	17 (United States)
1	Annemarie Pröll	Austria	70	20	(8)	(11)	(20)	25	25
2	Wiltrud Drexel	Austria	60	(4)	20	15	25	(11)	-
3	Françoise Macchi	France	56	25	11	20	(6)	-	(8)
4	Isabelle Mir	France	55	15	25	(8)	(8)	15	(11)
	Jacqueline Rouvier	France	55	(3)	(6)	(3)	15	20	20
6	Michèle Jacot	France	51	(6)	15	25	11	(4)	(4)
7	Annie Famose	France	29	-	(2)	6	-	8	15
8	Divina Galica	United Kingdom	11	11	-	-	-	-	-
9	Florence Steurer	France	9	8	-	1	-	-	-
	Margret Hafen	West Germany	9	-	-	4	-	3	2

=== Giant slalom ===
In women's giant slalom World Cup 1970/71 the best 3 results count. 11 racers had a point deduction, which are given in (). Annemarie Pröll won the cup with maximum points by winning the last three competitions.

Place	Name	Country	Total	5 (Socialist Federal Republic of Yugoslavia)	6 (West Germany)	14 (Canada)	18 (United States)	20 (United States)	21 (Italy)	22 (Italy)	23 (Sweden)
1	Annemarie Pröll	Austria	75	(15)	(4)	(11)	(20)	-	25	25	25
2	Michèle Jacot	France	70	-	25	(1)	25	-	20	-	-
3	Françoise Macchi	France	60	25	-	15	(1)	-	(15)	20	-
4	Gertrude Gabl	Austria	50	20	-	(2)	-	-	(4)	15	15
5	Isabelle Mir	France	48	-	8	25	-	15	(6)	-	-
6	Jacqueline Rouvier	France	42	(3)	11	20	11	-	-	-	-
	Britt Lafforgue	France	42	-	20	-	(2)	11	11	(3)	-
8	Marilyn Cochran	United States	34	-	-	6	8	(6)	-	(6)	20
9	Rosi Mittermaier	West Germany	29	8	6	-	15	-	-	-	-
10	Karen Budge	United States	28	-	-	4	4	20	-	-	(3)
11	Bernadette Rauter	Austria	26	11	-	-	-	4	(2)	(2)	11
12	Barbara Ann Cochran	United States	25	-	-	-	-	25	-	-	-

=== Slalom ===
In women's slalom World Cup 1970/71 the best 3 results count. Ten racers had a point deduction, which are given in ().

Place	Name	Country	Total	2 (France)	4 (Socialist Federal Republic of Yugoslavia)	7 (Germany)	8 (Switzerland)	10 (Austria)	12 (France)	13 (Switzerland)	15 (Canada)	19 (United States)
1	Britt Lafforgue	France	70	(11)	(8)	-	25	20	-	25	(8)	-
	Betsy Clifford	Canada	70	25	-	-	-	25	(8)	-	(3)	20
3	Barbara Ann Cochran	United States	65	(8)	(15)	-	(11)	-	20	-	20	25
	Annemarie Pröll	Austria	65	-	25	-	(3)	-	25	(3)	(11)	15
5	Michèle Jacot	France	56	-	-	25	20	-	11	-	-	-
6	Florence Steurer	France	51	20	11	-	(8)	(3)	-	20	(4)	-
7	Wiltrud Drexel	Austria	45	15	-	-	-	15	-	-	15	-
8	Gertrude Gabl	Austria	37	(1)	6	20	-	11	-	-	-	-
	Bernadette Rauter	Austria	37	6	20	-	-	(4)	(6)	-	-	11
10	Danièle Debernard	France	33	-	3	-	15	-	-	15	-	-
	Marilyn Cochran	United States	33	-	-	-	6	-	-	2	25	-

== Nations Cup ==
=== Overall ===
Place	Country	Total	Men	Ladies
1	France	1660	690	970
2	Austria	1076	400	676
3	Switzerland	475	467	8
4	United States	450	153	297
5	Italy	323	320	3
6	West Germany	259	188	71
7	Canada	112	0	112
8	Poland	43	43	0
9	Spain	42	15	27
10	United Kingdom	22	0	22
11	Australia	7	7	0
12	Norway	4	4	0

=== Men ===
Place	Country	Total	DH	GS	SL	Racers	Wins
1	France	690	149	267	274	9	10
2	Switzerland	467	276	125	66	13	6
3	Austria	400	119	136	145	9	2
4	Italy	320	78	112	130	5	5
5	West Germany	188	25	86	77	5	0
6	United States	153	14	20	119	8	1
7	Poland	43	0	16	27	1	0
8	Spain	15	0	0	15	2	0
9	Australia	7	7	0	0	1	0
10	Norway	4	0	0	4	1	0

=== Ladies ===
Place	Country	Total	DH	GS	SL	Racers	Wins
1	France	970	332	316	322	11	10
2	Austria	676	184	266	226	7	8
3	United States	297	22	122	153	7	3
4	Canada	112	4	7	101	2	2
5	West Germany	71	14	29	28	3	0
6	Spain	27	0	11	16	1	0
7	United Kingdom	22	11	4	7	2	0
8	Switzerland	8	3	5	0	2	0
9	Italy	3	0	0	3	1	0

== Medal table ==
Rank	Nation	Gold	Silver	Bronze	Total
1	France	20	21	18	59
2	Austria	10	10	13	33
3	Switzerland	6	3	4	13
4	Italy	5	4	5	14
5	United States	4	5	2	11
6	Canada	2	1	0	3
7	Germany	0	3	5	8
Totals (7 entries)		47	47	47	141
