= Augert =

Augert is a surname. Notable people with the surname include:

- Jean-Noël Augert (born 1949), French alpine skier
- Jean-Pierre Augert (1946–1976), French alpine skier, uncle of Jean-Noël
