= Jean-Pierre Vidal =

French alpine skier (born 1977)

Medal record

Representing France

Men's alpine skiing

Olympic Games
Gold medal – first place	2002 Salt Lake City	Slalom

World Championships
Bronze medal – third place	2005 Bormio	Nations' Team

World Military Ski Championships
Gold medal – first place	2004 Åre	Giant Slalom

Universiade
Gold medal – first place	1999 Poprad Tatry	Giant Slalom
Bronze medal – third place	1999 Poprad Tatry	Slalom

French Championships (FIS)
Gold medal – first place	2001 Courchevel	Slalom
Gold medal – first place	2001 Courchevel	Giant Slalom
Gold medal – first place	2003 Les Menuires	Slalom
Gold medal – first place	2004 Flaine	Giant Slalom
Gold medal – first place	2005 Alpe d'Huez	Giant Slalom

Jean-Pierre Vidal (born 24 February 1977 in Saint-Jean-de-Maurienne, Savoie) is a French alpine skier. As a young skier, he focused mainly on downhill. After hurting his knee, however, he decided to go for slalom. In 2002, he had his best year, winning a gold medal in the 2002 Winter Olympics and taking a World Cup win in Kranjska Gora. A song was called after him (Slalom dans la tête) and in the French ski resort Les Sybelles, a lift was named after his gold medal as well (Médaille d'Or in La Toussuire). After this fantastic year, it took Vidal until 2006 to return to the highest level of skiing competition. In January 2006, he won a World Cup race in Kitzbühel. Barely a month later, on February 24, 2006, he broke his forearm during a training session in Turin. He then decided to stop his professional career. At this time, the 2006 Winter Olympics were not over yet.

He is the brother of alpine skier Vanessa Vidal and the nephew of alpine skiers Jean-Noël Augert and Jean-Pierre Augert.

== World Cup victories ==
Date	Location	Race
22 December 2001	(Slovenia) Kranjska Gora	Slalom
22 January 2006	(Austria) Kitzbühel	Slalom
