= FIS Alpine World Ski Championships 1970 =

Skiing event in Val Gardena, Italy

- Host city: Val Gardena
- Country: Italy
- Events: 8
- Opening: 8 February 1970
- Closing: 15 February 1970
- Opened by: Giuseppe Saragat

Location in the Alps of Europe

The FIS Alpine World Ski Championships 1970 were held from 8 to 15 February in Gröden/Val Gardena, Italy.

For the only time, results from a World Championships were included in the World Cup points standings, then in its fourth season. Two seasons earlier, results from the Winter Olympics (concurrent World Championships) were also included in the World Cup standings.

The French team again led with ten medals: three gold, five silver, and two bronze.

== Men's competitions ==
=== Downhill ===
Sunday, 15 February

Place	Athlete	Country	Time	Diff.
1st place, gold medalist(s)	Bernhard Russi	Switzerland (SUI)	2:24.57	—
2nd place, silver medalist(s)	Karl Cordin	Austria (AUT)	2:24.79	+ 0.22
3rd place, bronze medalist(s)	Malcolm Milne	Australia (AUS)	2:25.09	+ 0.52
4	Karl Schranz	Austria (AUT)	2:25.46	+ 0.89
5	Marcello Varallo	Italy (ITA)	2:25.52	+ 0.95
5	Billy Kidd	United States (USA)	2:25.52	+ 0.95
7	Rudi Sailer	Austria (AUT)	2:26.12	+ 1.55
8	Jean-Luc Pinel	France (FRA)	2:26.59	+ 2.02
9	Anders Hansson	Sweden (SWE)	2:26.89	+ 2.32
10	Jon Terje Øverland	Norway (NOR)	2:27.05	+ 2.48

=== Giant slalom ===
Monday, 9 February (run 1)
Tuesday, 10 February (run 2)

Place	Athlete	Country	Time	Diff.
1st place, gold medalist(s)	Karl Schranz	Austria (AUT)	4:19.19	—
2nd place, silver medalist(s)	Werner Bleiner	Austria (AUT)	4:19.58	+ 0.39
3rd place, bronze medalist(s)	Dumeng Giovanoli	Switzerland (SUI)	4:21.15	+ 1.96
4	Heini Messner	Austria (AUT)	4:22.11	+ 2.92
4	Max Rieger	West Germany (FRG)	4:22.11	+ 2.92
6	Andrzej Bachleda	Poland (POL)	4:22.76	+ 3.57
7	Kurt Schnider	Switzerland (SUI)	4:22.81	+ 3.62
8	Patrick Russel	France (FRA)	4:22.97	+ 3.78
9	Alain Penz	France (FRA)	4:23.04	+ 3.85
10	Erik Håker	Norway (NOR)	4:24.49	+ 5.30

Schranz led after the first run at 2:15.15; Bleiner was next, 0.30 seconds back.

=== Slalom ===
Sunday, 8 February

Place	Athlete	Country	Time	Diff.
1st place, gold medalist(s)	Jean-Noël Augert	France (FRA)	1:39.47	—
2nd place, silver medalist(s)	Patrick Russel	France (FRA)	1:39.51	+ 0.04
3rd place, bronze medalist(s)	Billy Kidd	United States (USA)	1:39.53	+ 0.06
4	Gustav Thöni	Italy (ITA)	1:40.23	+ 0.76
5	Alain Penz	France (FRA)	1:40.54	+ 1.07
6	Dumeng Giovanoli	Switzerland (SUI)	1:42.38	+ 2.91
7	Peter Frei	Switzerland (SUI)	1:43.33	+ 3.86
8	Håkan Bjørge	Norway (NOR)	1:43.59	+ 4.12
9	F. Fernández Ochoa	Spain (ESP)	1:43.73	+ 4.26
10	Andrzej Bachleda	Poland (POL)	1:43.94	+ 4.47

=== Combined ===
Place	Athlete	Country	Points	DH	GS	SL
1st place, gold medalist(s)	Billy Kidd	United States (USA)	21.25	5	15	3rd place, bronze medalist(s)
2nd place, silver medalist(s)	Patrick Russel	France (FRA)	50.15	43	8	2nd place, silver medalist(s)
3rd place, bronze medalist(s)	Andrzej Bachleda	Poland (POL)	60.90	32	6	10
4	Max Rieger	West Germany (FRG)	66.31	36	4	13
5	Edmund Bruggmann	Switzerland (SUI)	69.29	12	14	16
6	Hansjörg Schlager	West Germany (FRG)	70.08	16	18	14
7	Peter Duncan	Canada (CAN)	72.48	28	25	12
8	Aurelio García	Spain (ESP)	91.81	21	32	15
9	F. Fernández Ochoa	Spain (ESP)	92.23	42	33	9
10	Keith Shepherd	Canada (CAN)	99.31	19	22	21

At the World Championships from 1954 through 1980, the combined was a "paper race" using the results of the three events (DH, GS, SL).

== Women's competitions ==
=== Downhill ===
Wednesday, 11 February

Placing	Country	Athlete	Time
1	Switzerland (SUI)	Annerösli Zryd	1:58.34
2	France (FRA)	Isabelle Mir	1:58.84
3	Austria (AUT)	Annemarie Pröll	2:00.43

=== Giant slalom ===
Saturday, 14 February

Placing	Country	Athlete	Time
1	Canada (CAN)	Betsy Clifford	1:20.46
2	France (FRA)	Ingrid Lafforgue	1:20.53
3	France (FRA)	Françoise Macchi	1.20.60

=== Slalom ===
Friday, 13 February

Placing	Country	Athlete	Time
1	France (FRA)	Ingrid Lafforgue	1:40.44
2	United States (USA)	Barbara Ann Cochran	1:42.15
3	France (FRA)	Michèle Jacot	1:42.20

=== Combined ===
Placing	Country	Athlete	Points
1	France (FRA)	Michèle Jacot	30.31
2	France (FRA)	Florence Steurer	37.69
3	United States (USA)	Marilyn Cochran	41.84

At the World Championships from 1954 through 1980, the combined was a "paper race" using the results of the three events (DH, GS, SL).

== Medals table ==
Place	Nation	Gold	Silver	Bronze	Total
1	France (FRA)	3	5	2	10
2	Switzerland (SUI)	2	–	1	3
3	Austria (AUT)	1	2	1	4
4	United States (USA)	1	1	2	4
5	Canada (CAN)	1	–	–	1
6	Australia (AUS)	–	–	1	1
6	Poland (POL)	–	–	1	1
