= Vanessa Vidal =

French alpine skier (born 1974)

Personal information
- Born: 21 December 1974 (age 51) Saint-Jean-de-Maurienne, Savoie (France)
- Height: 5 ft 6 in (1.68 m)
- Website: www.vanessa-vidal.com/vanessa-vidal/index.html

Skiing career
- Sport: Alpine skiing ♀
- Disciplines: Slalom, combined

Olympics
- Teams: 2 – (2002–2006)
- Medals: 0 (0 gold)

World Cup
- Seasons: 12
- Wins: 0
- Podiums: 0
- Overall titles: 0
- Discipline titles: 0

Vanessa Vidal (born 21 December 1974) is a former alpine skier from France, who competed in the 2002 Winter Olympics and 2006 Winter Olympics. She is the sister of former Olympic slalom champion Jean-Pierre Vidal and the niece of former alpine skiers Jean-Noël Augert and Jean-Pierre Augert.

== Career ==
Vidal, born in Saint-Jean-de-Maurienne, Savoie, made her debut in the Alpine Ski World Cup during the 1994–95 season, and was classified 104th overall. She won her first major championship in 1997, when she won the combined category of the French National Championship. Vidal's best World Cup finish came in the 1999–2000 season, when she was classified 35th; she also took a career-best fourth at Bormio during this season, in the slalom. She was ranked seventh in the 2002 Winter Olympics, and 26th in the 2006 Winter Olympics. In 2006, she won the slalom category of the French National Championship.
