= Rune Lindström =

Rune Lindström may refer to:

- Rune Lindström (screenwriter) (1916–1973), Swedish screenwriter and actor
- Rune Lindström (alpine skier) (born 1944), Swedish former alpine skier
