= Tyler Palmer =

American alpine skier (born 1950)

Tyler Palmer (born June 22, 1950) is a former American alpine skier who competed in the 1972 Winter Olympics. In the World Cup between March 1970 and December 1971, he achieved four podiums, nine top ten finishes and won two slalom races: 17 January 1971, at St. Moritz, and 19 December 1971, at Sestriere. In the 1971 Alpine Skiing World Cup, he finished 10th in the overall standings and 3rd in the slalom.
