= Rick Chaffee =

American alpine skier (born 1945)

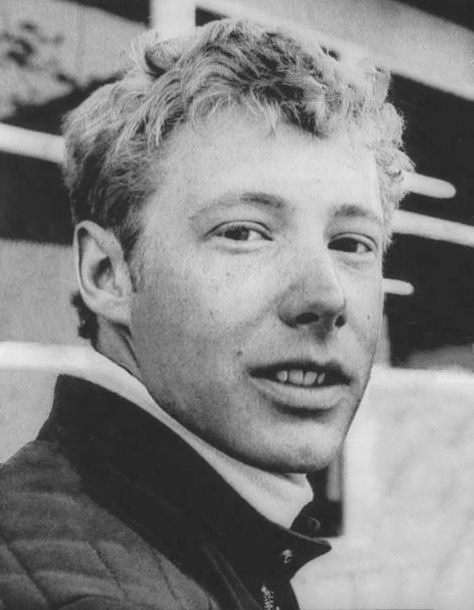
- Chaffee in 1970

Personal information
- Born: January 10, 1945 (age 81) Rutland, Vermont, U.S.
- Height: 5 ft 10 in (1.78 m)

Skiing career
- Sport: Alpine skiing
- Club: University of Denver
- Retired: March 1972 (age 27)
- Disciplines: Slalom, giant slalom
- World Cup debut: March 1967 (age 22)

Olympics
- Teams: 2 – (1968, 1972)
- Medals: 0

World Championships
- Teams: 3 – (1968, 1970, 1972) includes two Olympics
- Medals: 0

World Cup
- Seasons: 5 – (1968–1972)
- Wins: 0
- Podiums: 3 – (3 SL)
- Overall titles: 0 – (14th in 1968)
- Discipline titles: 0 – (7th in SL, 1968)

Frederick Stoddard "Rick" Chaffee II (born January 10, 1945) is a former World Cup alpine ski racer from the United States. He competed in the Winter Olympics in 1968 and 1972. Chaffee finished ninth in the slalom in 1968 to join teammates Spider Sabich and Jimmie Heuga in the top ten.

Born in Rutland, Vermont, Chaffee raced for the University of Denver and won individual and team NCAA titles; he took the individual titles in slalom and the combined in 1965 at Crystal Mountain, Washington, as the Pioneers won their fifth of seven consecutive team titles.

His brother Kim, sister Suzy, and cousin Jon are also former competitive skiers.

== World Cup results ==
=== Race podiums ===
- 3 podiums – (3 SL)
- 23 top tens – (16 SL, 7 GS)

Season	Date	Location	Discipline	Place
1968	29 Mar 1968	Rossland, Canada	Slalom	3rd
1968	7 Apr 1968	(United States) Heavenly Valley, USA	Slalom	3rd
1970	6 Mar 1970	(United States) Heavenly Valley, USA	Slalom	2nd

=== Season standings ===
Season	Age	Overall	Slalom	Giant Slalom	Super G	Downhill	Combined
1967	22	42	—	22	not run	—	not awarded
1968	23	14	7	18	not run	—	not awarded
1969	24	22	13	23	not run	—	not awarded
1970	25	24	10	27	not run	—	not awarded
1971	26	21	10	21	not run	—	not awarded
1972	27				not run	—	not awarded

Points were only awarded for top ten finishes (see scoring system).

== World Championship results ==
Year	Age	Slalom	Giant Slalom	Super-G	Downhill	Combined
1968	23	9	15	not run	—	—
1970	25	—	21	not run	—	—
1972	27	DNF1	30	not run	—	—

From 1948 through 1980, the Winter Olympics were also the World Championships for alpine skiing.
At the World Championships from 1954 through 1980, the combined was a "paper race" using the results of the three events (DH, GS, SL).

== Olympic results ==
Year	Age	Slalom	Giant Slalom	Super-G	Downhill	Combined
1968	23	9	15	not run	—	not run
1972	27	DNF1	30	not run	—	not run
