= Michel Bozon =

French alpine skier

Michel Bozon (July 6, 1950 – 23 January 1970), was a World Cup alpine ski racer from France.

Bozon, age 19, was killed on the Piste Emile Allais at Megève during a World Cup downhill event. He came off the course at the bottom of the Mur de Borné, an extremely steep section of about 250 metres (820 ft), fractured his skull and leg, and died several hours later.

After his death, changes were made to improve safety, but the course was taken off the World Cup circuit after February 1975.

He was a cousin of Charles Bozon, the French alpine skier who died in an avalanche in 1964.
