= Henri Duvillard =

French alpine skier

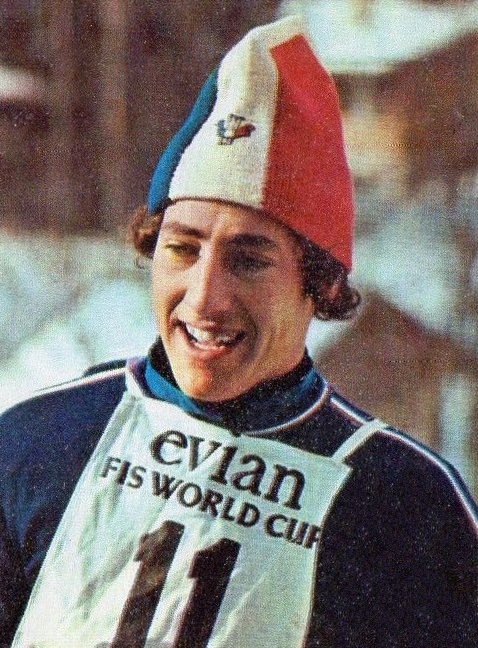
- Duvillard in 1972

Personal information
- Born: 23 December 1947 (age 78) Megève, France
- Height: 1.69 m (5 ft 7 in)

Skiing career
- Sport: Alpine skiing
- Club: Mont Blanc
- Retired: 1973 (age 25)
- World Cup debut: January 1967 (age 19) inaugural season

Olympics
- Teams: 1 – (1972)
- Medals: 0

World Championships
- Teams: 1 – (1972) (includes Olympics)
- Medals: 0

World Cup
- Wins: 6 – (3 DH, 2 GS, 1 SL)
- Podiums: 20 – (10 DH, 8 GS, 2 SL)
- Overall titles: 0 – (2nd in 1971, 1972)
- Discipline titles: 0 – (2nd in DH, 1969)
Medal record
Men's alpine skiing
Representing Austria
World Cup race podiums
Event	1st	2nd	3rd
Slalom	1	0	1
Giant slalom	2	2	4
Downhill	3	4	3
Total	6	6	8

Henri Duvillard (born 23 December 1947) is a retired French World Cup alpine ski racer. He is one of just seven men to win World Cup races in every discipline contested at the time. Duvillard competed at the 1972 Olympics in the slalom, giant slalom, and downhill events with the best result of fourth place in the slalom.

== Career ==
Duvillard's World Cup career lasted from its inception in 1967 until 1973, during which time he won six races, including the prestigious Lauberhorn downhill in Wengen, Switzerland. His best results came in 1971 and 1972, when he finished second in the overall standings, behind the legendary Gustav Thöni in consecutive seasons.

Troubles with the French national team leadership led him to retire from World Cup competition, and he moved on to the United States. In November 1974, Duvillard joined the U.S. pro tour and finished second (to American Hank Kashiwa) for the 1975 season (Duvillard won more money, but Kashiwa won on points). Duvillard dominated the tour in 1976, and became the pro champion at age 28.

After retiring from competition, Duvillard launched an eponymous French skiwear label. His mother-in-law May Nilsson, father-in-law Maurice Lafforgue, wife Britt Lafforgue, elder brother Adrien Duvillard, nephew Adrien Duvillard and son-in-law Frédéric Covili are all Olympic alpine skiers.

== World Cup results ==
=== Season standings ===
Season	Age	Overall	Slalom	Giant Slalom	Super G	Downhill	Combined
1967	19	42	30	—	not run	—	not run
1968	20	—	—	—	not run	—	not run
1969	21	6	16	9	not run	2	not run
1970	22	8	18	16	not run	3	not run
1971	23	2	13	4	not run	4	not run
1972	24	2	6	5	not run	6	not run
1973	25	11	6	8	not run	13	not run

Points were only awarded for top ten finishes (see scoring system).

=== Race victories ===
- 6 wins – (3 DH, 2 GS, 1 SL)
- 20 podiums – (10 DH, 8 GS, 2 SL)

Season	Date	Location	Discipline
1969	21 January 1969	Megève, France	Downhill
1970	10 January 1970	Wengen, Switzerland	Downhill
1971	13 December 1970	Sestriere, Italy	Downhill
1971	9 January 1971	Madonna di Campiglio, Italy	Giant slalom
1972	9 January 1972	Berchtesgaden, West Germany	Slalom
1973	19 January 1973	Megève, France	Giant slalom

== Olympic results ==
Year	Age	Slalom	Giant Slalom	Super-G	Downhill	Combined
1972	24	4	DNF1	not run	19	not run

From 1948 through 1980, the Winter Olympics were also the World Championships for alpine skiing.
