= Karl Cordin =

Austrian alpine skier (born 1948)

Personal information
- Born: 3 November 1948 (age 77) Dornbirn, Austria

Skiing career
- Sport: Alpine skiing
- Disciplines: Speed events
Medal record
World Championships
Silver medal – second place	1970 Val Gardena	Downhill

Karl Cordin (born 3 November 1948) is an Austrian former alpine skier who did only compete in Downhill Races; he competed in the 1972 Winter Olympics, becoming 7th silver medal at FIS Alpine World Ski Championships 1970 in downhill.

== Biography ==
Cording did win three World Cup races: on 21 February 1970 at Jackson Hole, on 20 December 1970 at Val-d’Isère, and on 18 December 1973 at Zell am See; he did become five-times second and twice third too. He also could achieve the Downhill World Cup in 1969-70. He won the silver medal in the FIS Alpine Skiing World Championships 1970 and became fourth in the FIS Alpine Skiing World Championships 1974; in both races he was overtaken by a racer with a higher number. In 1970, he was in lead (and it looked that he could gain the gold medal) - but Bernhard Russi did win. In 1974, he was on the way to win the bronze medal, but Willi Frommelt did catch it.
