= Dennis McCoy (alpine skier) =

American alpine skier (born 1945)

Dennis McCoy (born May 27, 1945) is a former World Cup alpine ski racer from the United States. He competed in the 1968 Winter Olympics and finished 21st in the downhill and had three top ten finishes in World Cup competition.

McCoy is the brother of Penny McCoy, the bronze medalist in the women's slalom at the 1966 World Championships. Their father is Dave McCoy (b. 1915), the founder of Mammoth Mountain Ski Area in California, and the family of six children was raised in nearby Bishop.
