= Sepp Heckelmiller =

German alpine skier (born 1943)

Sepp Heckelmiller (born 5 November 1943 in Bad Hindelang) is a German former alpine skier who competed in the 1968 Winter Olympics and 1972 Winter Olympics.
