= Patrick Russel =

French alpine skier

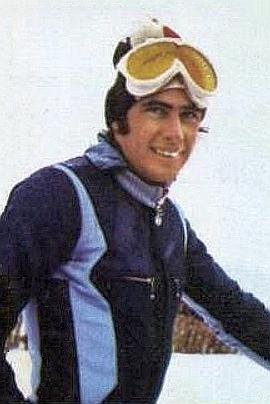

Personal information
- Born: 22 December 1946 (age 79) Chamonix, France

Skiing career
- Sport: Alpine skiing
- Retired: 1872
- World Cup debut: 1968

World Championships
- Teams: 1
- Medals: 2

World Cup
- Seasons: 5
- Wins: 13
- Podiums: 26
- Overall titles: 0 (2nd in 1970)
- Discipline titles: 3
Medal record
Men's alpine skiing
Representing France
World Cup race podiums
Event	1st	2nd	3rd
Slalom	9	1	6
Giant slalom	4	4	2
Total	13	5	8
World Championships
Silver medal – second place	1970 Val Gardena	Slalom
Silver medal – second place	1970 Val Gardena	Combined

Patrick Russel (born 22 December 1946) is a French former Alpine ski racer and World Cup champion. He specialized in the technical disciplines (giant slalom and slalom) and won three discipline championships in the World Cup: slalom in 1969 and 1970 and giant slalom in 1971. He also won two silver medals in slalom and combined at the 1970 World Championships at Val Gardena, Italy.

== Career ==
Russel was the son of Lee Russel, who was a marketing executive at the French ski manufacturer Rossignol. He competed on the World Cup circuit from 1968 through 1972 and became the first male to win World Cup races in three straight years (1968–70) and in four straight years (1968–71). Overall, he won 13 World Cup races and achieved 26 podiums during his career, as well as three discipline championships (slalom in 1969 and 1970; giant slalom in 1971) and two World Championship silver medals in 1970. In 1970, he finished second overall in the World Cup (only 3 points) behind Karl Schranz, and in 1971 he was third overall behind Gustav Thöni.

In 1972, Russel broke his leg during a giant slalom in Berchtesgaden, West Germany, three weeks before the Winter Olympics and was unable to compete for the remainder of the season. After the French men failed to medal during the Olympics, the French ski coach was replaced, and the new coach fired French stars Russel, Henri Duvillard and Jean-Noël Augert from the World Cup team at the start of 1973. It has been suggested that a conflict between the two alpine cultures (alpine and urban) provoked by Bozon and Rossignol caused the firings, the three racers involved being encouraged to not take both training and races seriously just before they were fired. The coaches themselves resigned. Bozon got what he wanted and in the process destroyed the French ski team for years thereafter. All three skiers then turned professional and competed in the United States until their retirements.

After his retirement from competition, Russel became a ski instructor in France at Les Arcs.

== World Cup victories ==
=== Season titles ===
Season	Discipline
1969	Slalom
1970	Slalom
1971	Giant slalom

=== Individual victories ===
13 total wins (9 slalom, 4 giant slalom)

Date	Location	Race
25 February 1968	(Norway) Oslo	Slalom
10 March 1968	(Slovenia) Kranjska Gora	Slalom
19 January 1969	(Austria) Kitzbühel	Slalom
9 February 1969	(Sweden) Åre	Slalom
20 December 1969	(Austria) Lienz	Giant slalom
11 January 1970	(Switzerland) Wengen	Slalom
18 January 1970	(Austria) Kitzbühel	Slalom
25 February 1970	(France) Megève	Slalom
8 March 1970	(United States) Heavenly Valley	Giant slalom
15 March 1970	(Norway) Voss	Slalom
17 December 1970	(France) Val-d'Isère	Giant slalom
18 January 1971	(Switzerland) Adelboden	Giant slalom
14 February 1971	(Canada) Mont St. Anne	Slalom
