= Jean-Noël Augert =

French alpine skier

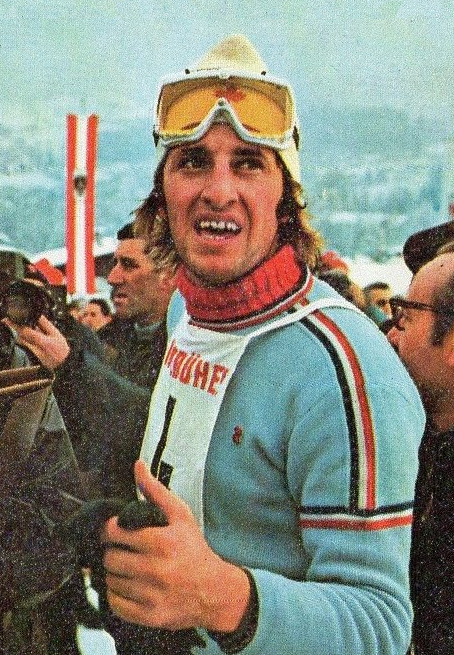
- Augert in 1972

Personal information
- Born: 17 August 1949 (age 76) Saint-Jean-de-Maurienne, France
- Height: 1.80 m (5 ft 11 in)

Skiing career
- Sport: Alpine skiing
- Club: Savoie Mont Blanc
- Retired: 1973
- Disciplines: Technical events
- World Cup debut: 1969

Olympics
- Teams: 1

World Championships
- Teams: 2
- Medals: 1 (1 gold)

World Cup
- Seasons: 5
- Wins: 15
- Podiums: 30
- Discipline titles: 3
Medal record
Men's alpine skiing
Representing France
World Cup race podiums
| Event | 1st | 2nd | 3rd |
|---|---|---|---|
| Slalom | 13 | 6 | 2 |
| Giant slalom | 2 | 3 | 4 |
| Total | 15 | 9 | 6 |
World Championships
| Gold medal – first place | 1970 Val Gardena | Slalom |

Jean-Noël Augert (born 17 August 1949) is a French former alpine skier. He competed at the 1972 Olympics and finished in fifth place in the slalom and giant slalom.

== Career ==
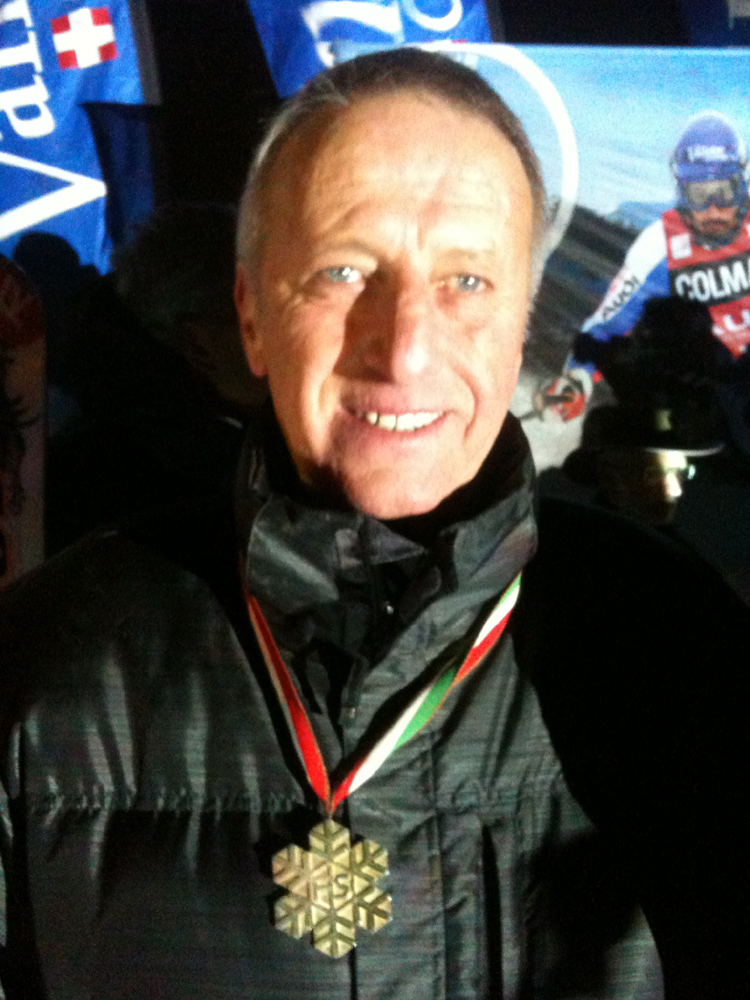
Jean-Noël Augert in 2011

Augert was born in Saint-Jean-de-Maurienne and grew at the La Toussuire ski resort, Savoy. he debuted in the Alpine Skiing World Cup with a victory, at the Adelboden giant slalom (6 January 1969). Nicknamed "Rosko", he was, however, a specialist of the slalom discipline, in which he won three World Cups in 1969, 1971 and 1972, and in which he won a gold medal at the 1970 World Championships in Val Gardena. He was also second in the overall classification of the 1969 World Cup and third in the giant slalom World Cup 1969. Besides his 15 wins in World Cup races, he finished 15 times at the podium (place two: 6 slaloms, 3 giant slaloms; place three: 2 slaloms, 4 giant slaloms). He came fifth in both the men's slalom and giant slalom at the 1972 Winter Olympics. Becoming fifth in the giant slalom at Sapporo did come up to his expectations, but the other fifth place didn't (it was disappointing). Because he did win the slalom Races at Lauberhorn and Hahnenkamm (known as the most difficult Slalom Races) a few weeks before - he was the odds-one favorite.

In the Hahnenkamm-Races in 1971, he could win two Slalom Races: One on 23 January, one on 24 January - but only the second one counted for the World Cup. The race on 23 January (it was called FIS-Race) was carried out instead of the downhill Race, which was cancelled because lack of snow.

Augert retired from the competitions aged 24, due to quarrels with the French Ski Federation (December 1973). In 1975 he married the fellow alpine skier Françoise Macchi. He is the uncle of Jean-Pierre Vidal, Olympic champion in slalom at the 2002 Winter Olympics, and fellow alpine skier Vanessa Vidal. He also is the nephew of Jean-Pierre Augert.

== World Cup victories ==
=== Season titles ===
| Season | Discipline |
|---|---|
| 1969 | Slalom |
| 1971 | Slalom |
| 1972 | Slalom |

=== Individual races ===
- 15 wins – (13 slalom, 2 giant slalom)

| Date | Location | Race |
|---|---|---|
| 6 January 1969 | (Switzerland) Adelboden | Giant slalom |
| 8 February 1969 | (Sweden) Åre | Giant slalom |
| 22 March 1969 | (United States) Waterville Valley | Slalom |
| 21 December 1969 | (Austria) Lienz | Slalom |
| 8 February 1970 | (Italy) Val Gardena † | Slalom |
| 6 January 1971 | (West Germany) Berchtesgaden | Slalom |
| 24 January 1971 | (Austria) Kitzbühel | Slalom |
| 30 January 1971 | (France) Megève | Slalom |
| 7 February 1971 | (Switzerland) Mürren | Slalom |
| 14 March 1971 | (Sweden) Åre | Slalom |
| 16 January 1972 | (Austria) Kitzbühel | Slalom |
| 23 January 1972 | (Switzerland) Wengen | Slalom |
| 28 January 1973 | (Austria) Kitzbühel | Slalom |
| 15 March 1973 | (Japan) Naeba | Slalom |
| 23 March 1973 | (United States) Heavenly Valley | Slalom |

† Results from the 1970 World Championships were included in the World Cup standings.
