= Håkon Mjøen =

Norwegian alpine skier (born 1944)

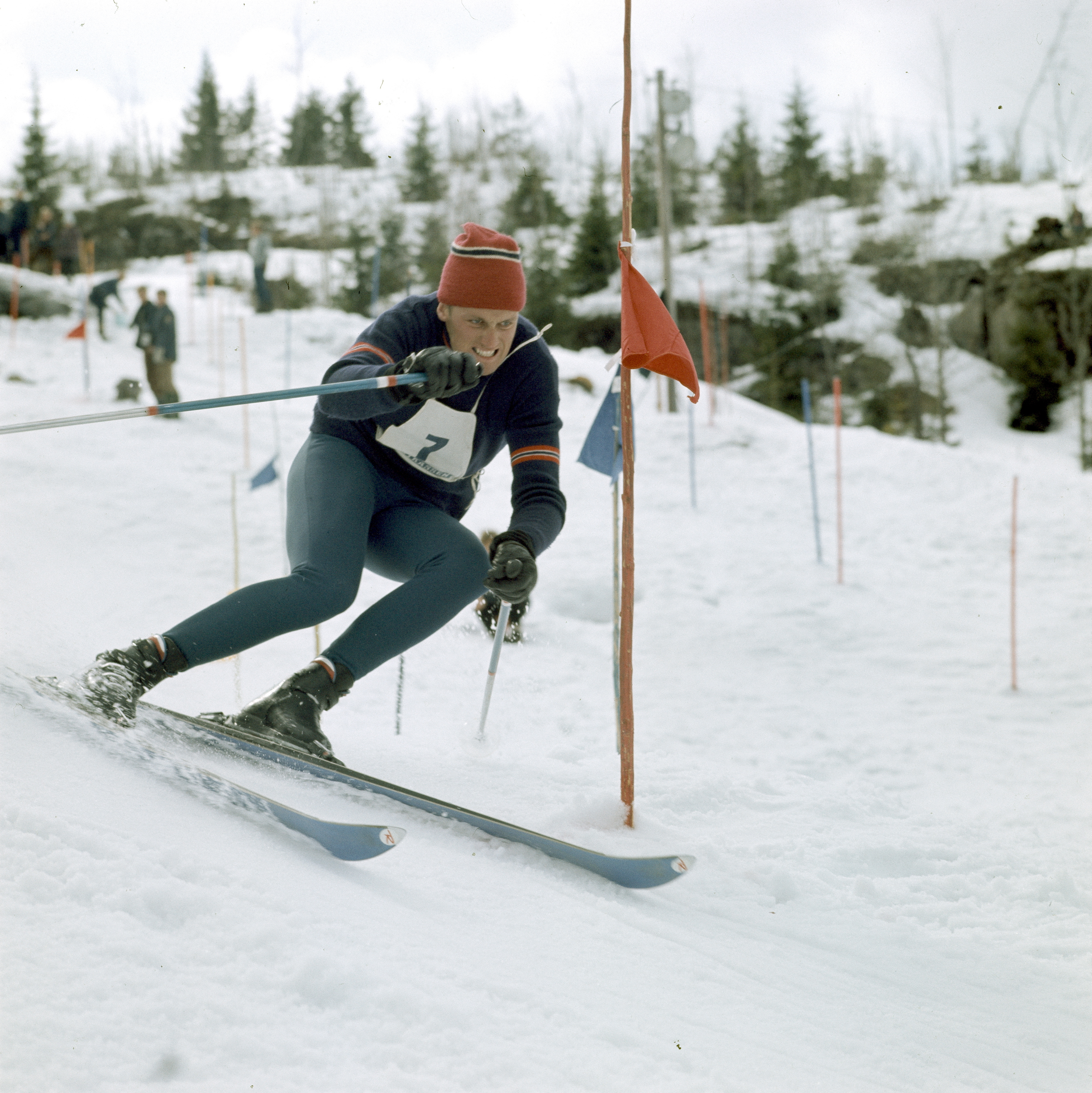

Personal information
- Born: 5 November 1944 (age 81) Oppdal Municipality, Norway

Sport
- Country: Norway
- Sport: Alpine skiing
- Event(s): slalom, giant slalom, alpine combined
- Club: Oppdal IL

Håkon Mjøen (born 5 November 1944) is a Norwegian alpine skier.

== Biography ==
Mjøen was born in Oppdal Municipality on 5 November 1944. He participated at the 1968 Winter Olympics in Grenoble, where he competed in slalom and giant slalom.

He became Norwegian champion in slalom in 1966, 1967 and 1970, in giant slalom in 1966,1967 and 1968, and in alpine combined in 1966 and 1967.
