= Spider Sabich =

American alpine skier (1945–1976)

Personal information
- Born: January 10, 1945 Sacramento, California, U.S.
- Died: March 21, 1976 (aged 31) Aspen, Colorado, U.S.
- Height: 5 ft 11 in (1.80 m)

Skiing career
- Country: United States
- Sport: Alpine skiing ♂
- Club: Red Hornet - Edelweiss, CA; University of Colorado
- Retired: April 1970 (age 26) (World Cup)
- Disciplines: Slalom, giant slalom, downhill, combined
- World Cup debut: January 1967 (age 22) inaugural season

Olympics
- Teams: 1 – (1968)
- Medals: 0

World Championships
- Teams: 2 – (1968, 1970) includes Olympics
- Medals: 0

World Cup
- Seasons: 4 – (1967–70)
- Wins: 1 – (1 SL)
- Podiums: 4 – (4 SL)
- Overall titles: 0 – (11th in 1969)
- Discipline titles: 0 – (7th in SL 1969)

Vladimir Peter Sabich Jr. (January 10, 1945 – March 21, 1976) was an American alpine ski racer, a member of the U.S. Ski Team on the World Cup circuit in the late 1960s. He competed at the 1968 Winter Olympics and was the pro ski racing champion in 1971 and 1972. Sabich was killed by gunshot in 1976, under controversial circumstances involving Claudine Longet.

== Early life ==
The grandson of Croatian immigrants, Sabich was the second child of Vladimir (1915–2001) and Frances Sabich (1911–2003). His lifelong nickname "Spider" was given by his father as a result of thin arms and legs at a premature birth. Spider's father was an officer of the California Highway Patrol and had volunteered in World War II as a North American B-25 Mitchell bomber pilot in the Air Force; he was held as an internee in Siberia by the Soviets for a year after his plane was shot up over northern Japan and forced down near Vladivostok. After the war, Vlad was a test pilot and then returned to his job with the Highway Patrol in Sacramento, and in 1950 he was transferred to Kyburz on Highway 50, southwest of Lake Tahoe.

The three Sabich children (Mary, Spider, and Steve) learned to ski at Edelweiss ski area, about a dozen miles (20 km) up the highway, a mile past Twin Bridges. They attended a one-room school in Kyburz, Silver Fork Elementary, and went to class in the summer and skied during the winter, frequently arriving in their father's patrol car.

Spider and Steve were altar boys at the Chapel of Our Lady of the Sierras Catholic church across the highway from the ski area and would often strap on their skis immediately following Mass. Their ski coach was Lutz Aynedter, a downhill champion from the 1940s who emigrated from Germany to California after the war. He taught the Sabich boys European-style ski racing, and Spider and Steve became junior stars among the fearless young racers of Edelweiss, who became known as the "Highway 50 Boys." The Edelweiss ski area closed in the early 1960s after a poor snow year; the location is now called Camp Sacramento.

Despite their outdated equipment, Spider and Steve established themselves as top junior ski racers in northern California in the early 1960s. After graduation from El Dorado High School in Placerville, both were offered skiing scholarships on the Colorado Buffaloes team at the University of Colorado Boulder, one of the dominant collegiate programs of the era. Head coach Bob Beattie was also the coach of the U.S. Ski Team, and the national team was heavy with University of Colorado skiers. While at Colorado, Spider majored in aeronautical engineering and was selected to the national team. Steve's career was ended by a knee injury while at University of Colorado.

== Olympics and World Cup ==
Sabich skied on the World Cup circuit for its first four seasons, and finished fifth in the slalom in the thick fog at the 1968 Winter Olympics at age 22. His sole World Cup victory came two months later in April, a slalom at Heavenly Valley at South Lake Tahoe, just east of his hometown of Kyburz. He finished eighth in the slalom standings for the 1968 season and was the U.S. downhill champion.

Sabich reached the World Cup podium (top three) three more times in the slalom in 1969. He finished seventh in the 1969 Alpine Skiing World Cup season standings for the slalom and 11th overall, but fell out of the top ten in the slalom the following year.

Sabich had 18 top ten finishes in Olympic and World Cup competition: two in downhill, three in giant slalom, and 13 in slalom.

== World Cup results ==
=== Season standings ===
Season	Age	Overall	Slalom	Giant Slalom	Super G	Downhill	Combined
1967	22	32	20	—	not run	—	not run
1968	23	17	8	—	not run	18	not run
1969	24	11	7	18	not run	20	not run
1970	25	30	16	17	not run	—	not run

Points were only awarded for top ten finishes (see scoring system).

=== Race podiums ===
- 1 win - (1 SL)
- 4 podiums - (4 SL), 18 top tens (2 DH, 3 GS, 13 SL)

Season	Date	Location	Discipline	Place
1968	7 Apr 1968	Heavenly Valley, United States	Slalom	1st
1969	12 Jan 1969	Wengen, Switzerland	Slalom	2nd
1969	26 Jan 1969	Megève, France	Slalom	3rd
1970	21 Dec 1969	Lienz, Austria	Slalom	3rd

== World Championship results ==
Year	Age	Slalom	Giant Slalom	Super-G	Downhill	Combined
1968	23	5	14	not run	—	—
1970	25	DNF2	DNF2	not run	—	—

From 1948 through 1980, the Winter Olympics were also the World Championships for alpine skiing.
At the World Championships from 1954 through 1980, the combined was a "paper race" using the results of the three events (DH, GS, SL).

== Olympic results ==
Year	Age	Slalom	Giant Slalom	Super-G	Downhill	Combined
1968	23	5	14	not run	—	not run

== World Pro Ski Tour ==
Sabich turned professional after the 1970 season, following his friend Billy Kidd, who joined the pro tour in mid-February 1970 and won the first title. Pro ski racing was conducted in a dual slalom (and giant slalom) format, with racers going head-to-head in elimination heats. It was staged primarily in the United States, rather than Europe, and was headed by his former coach, Bob Beattie.

The attractive and charismatic Sabich helped popularize skiing in the U.S. in the late 1960s and early 1970s; he was the suspected inspiration (along with Kidd) for the 1969 film Downhill Racer, starring Robert Redford (although Sabich was much more light-hearted than Redford's Dave Chappellet). Sabich won the pro championship in 1971 and 1972. The prize money was modest (he took home $21,189 as champion in 1971), but handsome endorsements for the era followed, which pushed his annual income well over $100,000. This allowed him to move from his collegiate (and Alpine Skiing World Cup) base of Boulder to the ski resort of Aspen in 1971.

With his brother's help, Sabich built a house in 1971 in the gated Starwood area northwest of Aspen, near the home of singer John Denver. (Sabich's chalet was originally built for $90,000; its estimated value was $250,000 in 1976 and $3 million by the mid-1990s.) A lifelong appreciator of aviation, Sabich earned his pilot's license and owned a twin-engine Piper Aztec that he flew to his pro skiing events in North America.

While chasing Jean-Claude Killy for the 1973 pro title, Sabich incurred a back injury (compressed vertebra) on the final weekend of the season at Aspen Highlands. In the semifinals of the giant slalom, he hurtled over the second jump at 50 mph (80 km/h) and caught his arm on a gate, and somersaulted onto the back of his neck in an explosion of snow and skis. He struggled to stand up, but was too stunned to walk and was hospitalized. Sabich was out of the next day's slalom, and Killy won the season title in his first (and only full season) on the pro tour. Sabich finished third on the money list, at $36,500.

Unfortunately, injuries curtailed Sabich's success over the next three seasons, and his last victory on the pro circuit was in early January 1974 at Mount Snow, Vermont. A few months later he hurt his knee in Sun Valley, and finished fifth on the money list in 1974 at $25,100, with Killy sitting out the season. Sabich had knee surgery in August, and was featured on the cover of GQ magazine in November as "pro skiing's richest racer," holding his tri-color K2 skis, but sat out the 1975 season. He returned to the circuit in 1976 but qualified for only two races, with just $800 in earnings.

== Death ==
Late in the afternoon on Sunday, March 21, 1976, Sabich returned from a training session at Aspen Highlands and a brief visit with Bob Beattie, whom he planned to meet for dinner. While preparing to shower, he was shot in the bathroom of his Starwood home by his live-in girlfriend, singer-actress Claudine Longet. The two had met at a pro-celebrity event four years earlier in 1972 in Bear Valley, California. She claimed the gun accidentally discharged as he was showing her how it worked. Sabich was hit by a single gunshot in the abdomen and lost a significant amount of blood before an ambulance arrived. He died on the way to Aspen Valley Hospital with Longet at his side, shortly after 5:00 p.m. Sabich was 31 years old.

Longet, 34, was arrested and charged with the shooting. At the trial, Longet repeated the claim that the gun had accidentally discharged when Sabich was showing her how to use it.

The Pitkin County Sheriffs who made the arrest made two procedural errors that aided Longet's defense: without warrants, they took a blood sample from her and confiscated her diary. According to prosecutors, the sample showed the presence of a trace amount of cocaine in her blood, and her diary reportedly contradicted her claim that her relationship with Sabich had not soured. In addition, the gun (which had a defective safety and an overly lubricated firing mechanism) was mishandled by non-weapons experts. Because they were unable to cite any of the disallowed material, prosecutors did use the autopsy report to suggest that when Sabich was struck, he was bent over, facing away, and at least 6 feet (1.8 m) away from Longet, which would be inconsistent with the position and relative distance of someone demonstrating the operation of a firearm.

The jury convicted her of a lesser charge—misdemeanor criminal negligence—and sentenced her to pay a small fine and spend 30 days in jail. The judge allowed Longet to choose the days she served, believing that this arrangement would allow her to spend the most time with her children, and she decided to work off most of her sentence on weekends. Critical reaction to the verdict and sentencing was exacerbated when she subsequently vacationed with her defense attorney, Ron Austin, who was married at the time. Longet and Austin later married and lived in Aspen until her death in 2026.

After the criminal trial, Sabich's parents filed a civil lawsuit against Longet in May 1977. The case was eventually resolved out of court in September 1979, with the provision that Longet never tell nor write about her story.

== Burial ==
Sabich is buried in northern California at Westwood Hills Memorial Park in Placerville, where he attended high school. His hometown of Kyburz, 25 miles (40 km) east and upstream, did not have a cemetery in 1976. Kidd delivered the eulogy at the brief service, with former coach Beattie and former teammates as pallbearers.

Sabich is buried next to his older sister, Mary Frances Sabich, a physician who died of brain cancer in 1988 at the age of 45. Younger brother Steve died of melanoma in 2004 at age 57, shortly after the deaths of their parents.

== Media portrayals ==
=== In music ===
- In 1980, Mick Jagger and Keith Richards wrote a song about Spider Sabich's death that was intended to be on the Rolling Stones album Emotional Rescue. The song, titled "Claudine", had lyrics that painted a graphic picture of some of the more salacious aspects of the affair and killing. It was deemed too controversial and was removed, although it was included on several bootleg Rolling Stones albums. In November 2011, the track "Claudine" was released on the deluxe reissue of their album Some Girls.
- The Geraldine Fibbers recorded a song called "Claudine" on their 1997 album Butch. Although an instrumental, the credits list vocals courtesy of the Spider Sabich Memorial Choir.

=== In television ===
- 1976: Saturday Night Live (season 1, episode 18 on April 24, 1976) featured a Weekend Update segment about "The Claudine Longet Invitational Ski Championship." It showed skiers making runs down the slopes until they are "accidentally" shot by Longet, resulting in abrupt wipeouts. Longet's attorneys wrote a cease-and-desist letter to Lorne Michaels and an apology was given in the next week's show.
- 2001: Gilmore Girls episode 1.12, "Double Date" (January 18, 2001), references Longet in a conversation between Rory, Lane, and Lorelai while her music plays in the background.
- 2003: City Confidential episode 4.13, "Aspen: Murder on the Slopes" (29 July 2003), featured the city of Aspen and the case.
- TV Series Dominick Dunne's Power, Privilege, and Justice aired an episode on the case in Season 6, Episode 5, "The Starlet And The Skier".

=== In art ===
- 2012: Artist Josh Agle created a piece titled "Love, Spider" for the Denver Modernism Show depicting a Colorado scene with a brunette in the foreground wearing a cast signed with a heart by "Spider".
