= Jakob Tischhauser =

Swiss alpine skier

Personal information
- Born: 26 March 1942 (age 84) Parpan, Switzerland

Skiing career
- Sport: Alpine skiing
- Retired: 1970
- Disciplines: Technical events
- World Cup debut: 1967

World Championships
- Teams: 1

World Cup
- Seasons: 4
- Podiums: 5
Medal record
Men's alpine skiing
Representing Switzerland
World Cup race podiums
Event	1st	2nd	3rd
Giant slalom	0	2	3

Jakob Tischhauser (born 26 March 1942) is a former Swiss alpine skier.

== Career ==
During his career he has achieved 5 results among the top 3 in the World Cup. He was 4th in giant slalom at the FIS Alpine World Ski Championships 1966.

== World Cup results ==
Top 3

Date	Place	Discipline	Rank
20 December 1969	(Austria) Lienz	Giant slalom	3
21 March 1969	(United States) Waterville Valley	Giant slalom	3
15 March 1969	(Canada) Mont-Sainte-Anne	Giant slalom	3
1 March 1969	(United States) Squaw Valley	Giant slalom	2
8 February 1969	(Sweden) Åre	Giant slalom	2

== National titles ==
Tischhauser has won two national championships at individual senior level.

- Swiss Alpine Ski Championships
  - Giant slalom: 1970
  - Slalom: 1967
