= Rune Lindström (alpine skier) =

Swedish alpine skier (born 1944)

Nils Rune Lindström (born 26 May 1944 in Sollefteå) is a Swedish former alpine skier who competed in the 1964 and 1968 Winter Olympics.
