= Billy Kidd =

American alpine skier (born 1943)

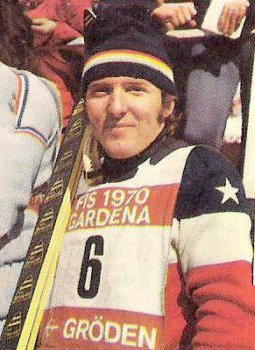
- Kidd after winning the world title in 1970

Personal information
- Born: April 13, 1943 (age 83) Burlington, Vermont, U.S.
- Height: 5 ft 9 in (175 cm)

Skiing career
- Sport: Alpine skiing

Olympics
- Teams: 2 – (1964, 1968)
- Medals: 1 (0 gold)

World Championships
- Teams: 5 – (1962–1970) includes two Olympics
- Medals: 4 (1 gold)

World Cup
- Seasons: 3 – (1968–1970)
- Wins: 2 – 2 (SL)
- Podiums: 4 – 4 (SL)
- Overall titles: 0 – (7th in 1968)
- Discipline titles: 0 – (8th in SL & GS, 1968)
Medal record
Men's alpine skiing
Representing the United States
Olympic Games
Silver medal – second place	1964 Innsbruck	Slalom
World Championships
Gold medal – first place	1970 Val Gardena	Combined
Bronze medal – third place	1964 Innsbruck	Combined
Bronze medal – third place	1970 Val Gardena	Slalom

William Winston Kidd (born April 13, 1943) is a former World Cup alpine ski racer, a member of the U.S. Ski Team from 1962 to 1970.

At the 1964 Winter Olympics at Innsbruck, Kidd and teammate Jimmie Heuga became the first American men to win Olympic medals in alpine skiing, winning silver and bronze in the slalom. Six years later, Kidd won a gold medal in the combined and a bronze in the slalom at the 1970 World Championships in Val Gardena, Italy. He promptly switched circuits and enjoyed a successful pro ski racing career from 1970 to 1972, winning the World Pro Ski Tour World Championships in 1970, becoming the only racer in history to win FIS and Pro titles the same year.

Since 1970, Kidd has enjoyed enduring "Legend" status in the sport, and remained in the public eye in his job (1970-2024) as Director of Skiing at Steamboat Ski Resort in Colorado.

== Early life ==
Born in Burlington, Vermont, Kidd grew up in the 1950s in the ski town of Stowe, where his parents, Bill and Betty, ran the Buccaneer Motel. With encouragement and coaching from his father, and with support from the town of Stowe, he became a top junior ski racer at Stowe with the Mount Mansfield Ski Team. Along with best friend and skiing rival Jimmie Heuga, Kidd was named to the U.S. Ski Team for the 1962 season.

== Ski racing ==
Kidd made a name for himself that first season at age 18 with an eighth place in the slalom and a 15th place in the giant slalom (GS) at the 1962 World Championships in Chamonix, France. After enduring a season hampered by injuries, Kidd entered the 1964 season with high hopes and gritty determination. A silver medalist in the slalom at the 1964 Winter Olympics in Innsbruck, Kidd was the first American man (along with Heuga, who took bronze in the same race) to earn an Olympic medal in alpine skiing. Both Kidd and Heuga were just 20 years old at the time. Kidd finished seventh in the giant slalom and 16th in the downhill. Completing all three races kept him eligible for the combined, then a non-medal event in the Olympics (but a World Championship medal event), and he took third for the FIS bronze.

In the final non-World Cup season of 1966, Kidd won three crucial races in Europe and was actually outracing Jean-Claude Killy. Kidd suffered the first of two major injuries that almost ended his career, a left ankle sprain in late January, which resulted in a tendon operation. Later the same year, he broke his right tibia in two places during downhill training at the 1966 World Championships, held in August in Portillo, Chile. The injury also kept him out of the first World Cup season of 1967. During this injury time, he returned to college at the University of Colorado Boulder.

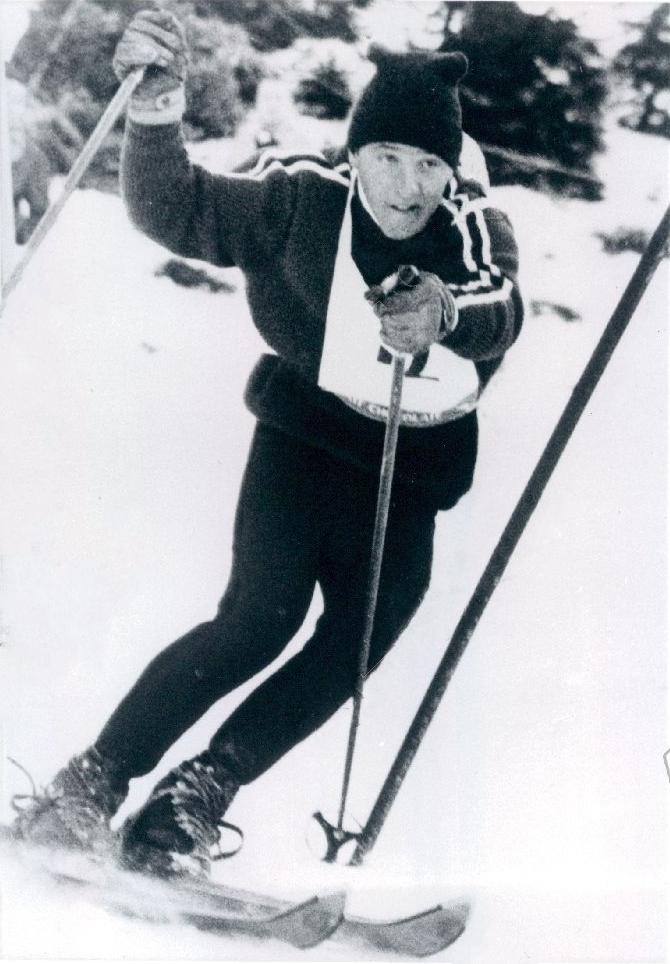
Kidd in 1965

The following year he took fifth in the giant slalom (GS) at the 1968 Winter Olympics in Grenoble, France. He took 15th in the downhill but did not finish the first run of the slalom, which was held in thick fog. Following those Olympics, he won a World Cup slalom in Aspen in March and finished 7th in the overall World Cup standings, the best from North America. For the 1968 World Cup season, Kidd finished in the top ten in all three events: 8th in giant slalom, 9th in downhill, and 10th in slalom. His first World Cup victory came a month later at the Roch Cup slalom in Aspen, Colorado. His second win came a year later, also a slalom on U.S. snow at Squaw Valley, California.

At the 1970 World Championships in Val Gardena, Italy, Kidd won the gold medal in the combined and the bronze in the slalom. On winning the gold, he said, "I'd always promised my mom I'd bring home a gold medal." Following the conclusion of the World Championships in mid-February 1970, Kidd retired from the World Cup circuit, and immediately joined the new pro circuit, started by former U.S. Ski Team coach (and Kidd's and Heuga's University of Colorado ski coach) Bob Beattie. Kidd won the pro championship the same year, the only racer to hold world titles in the two circuits at once. Nagging injuries led to few starts during the 1972 season, and he retired from the pro circuit that fall.

Kidd graduated from the University of Colorado Boulder in 1969 with a Bachelor of Science degree in economics. Hall of Fame inductions: 1976 The US Ski & Snowboard Hall of Fame 1986 The Colorado Snowsports Hall of Fame 1995 The Colorado Sports Hall of Fame 2013 The Vermont Sports Hall of Fame

== Steamboat Springs ==
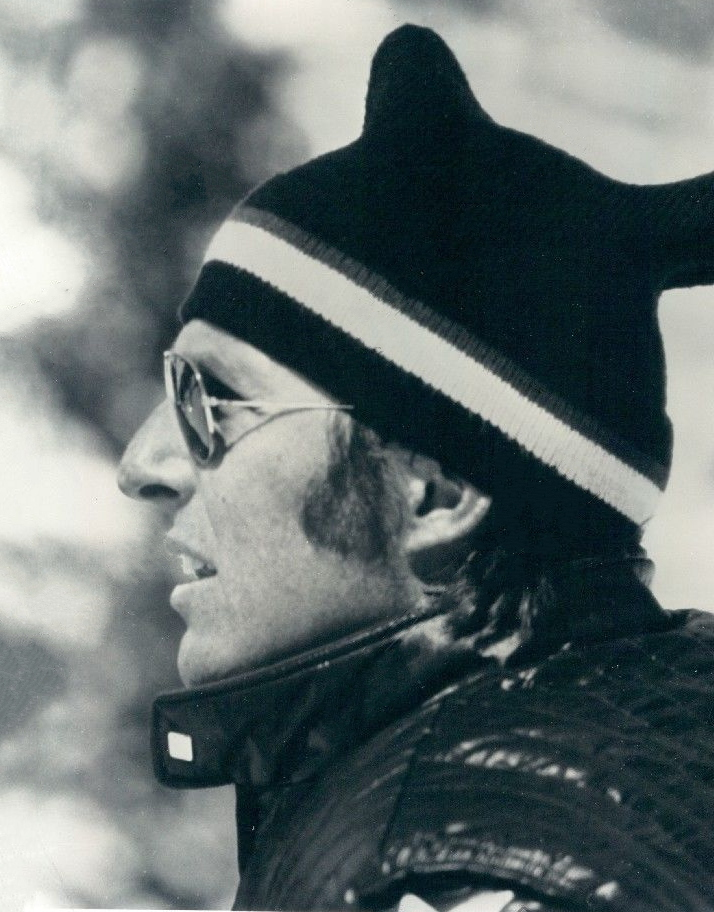
Kidd in 1972

Kidd moved to Steamboat Springs, Colorado, in 1970, and became associated with Steamboat Ski & Resort, where he served as Director of Skiing. In 2020, he marked his 50th year at the resort. Kidd has also represented the resort at public events and is known for wearing a Stetson cowboy hat. For more than 50 ski seasons, he hosted a free daily on-mountain ski clinic at the resort, during which participants skied the Heavenly Daze run and received skiing instruction from Kidd, who also discussed his experience competing in the Olympic Games.

At the invitation of Special Olympics founder Eunice Kennedy Shriver, Kidd served on the Board of Directors of Special Olympics International. He also served on the President's Council on Physical Fitness and on the board of the Jimmie Heuga Center (multiple sclerosis) in Vail. He regularly hosted Native American teens at Steamboat for annual "Future Olympians" weekends of skiing and snowboard instruction. Participants came mainly from the Ute reservation near Salt Lake City.

In the late 1980s, Kidd appeared in the award-winning American Express "Portraits" advertising campaign, photographed by Annie Leibovitz at The Billy Kidd Ranch near Steamboat. The campaign highlighted portraits of some of the most prominent people in the world, with the tagline "Achievers, visionaries, icons ... all with one thing in common." Besides Kidd, other AmEx card-carrying celebrities featured in the series included Ella Fitzgerald, Sofia Loren, Arnold Schwarzenegger, Tip O'Neill, Eric Heiden, Ray Charles, Willie Shoemaker, and Wilt Chamberlain.

Kidd has hosted corporate ski outings for companies including American Express, Rolex, UPS, American Airlines, Time, and Sports Illustrated magazines, and others.

Upon retiring from his Director of Skiing position at Steamboat Ski Resort, Kidd moved back to his college town of Boulder, Colorado.

== World Cup results ==
=== Season standings ===
Season	Age	Overall	Slalom	Giant Slalom	Super G	Downhill	Combined
1967	23	injured in August 1966, missed entire season					
1968	24	7	8	8	not run	9	not awarded
1969	25	13	8	12	not run	—	not awarded
1970	26	15	10	19	not run	12	not awarded

Results from the 1968 Winter Olympics and World Championships results were included in World Cup standings.

=== Race podiums ===
- 2 wins – (2 SL)
- 4 podiums, 19 top-ten finishes.

Season	Date	Location	Discipline	Place
1968	March 16, 1968	(United States) Aspen, USA	Slalom	1st
1969	February 28, 1969	(United States) Squaw Valley, USA	Slalom	1st
1969	March 16, 1969	Mont-Sainte-Anne, Canada	Slalom	3rd
1970	February 8, 1970	Val Gardena, Italy ^	Slalom	3rd

^ World Championships were also World Cup events in 1970

== World Championship results ==
Year	Age	Slalom	Giant Slalom	Super-G	Downhill	Combined
1962	18	8	15	not run	—	—
1964	20	2	7	not run	16	3
1966	23	—	—	not run	—	—
1968	24	DNF1	5	not run	18	—
1970	26	3	15	not run	5	1

From 1948 through 1980, the Winter Olympics were also the World Championships for alpine skiing.
At the World Championships from 1954 through 1980, the combined was a "paper race" using the results of the three events (DH, GS, SL).

- The 1966 championships were held in August in Chile; Kidd broke his leg during a downhill training run.

== Olympic results ==
Year	Age	Slalom	Giant Slalom	Super-G	Downhill	Combined
1964	20	2	7	not run	16	not run
1968	24	DNF1	5	not run	18	not run
