= Peter Frei =

Swiss alpine skier (born 1946)

Personal information
- Born: August 6, 1946 (age 79) Davos, Switzerland
- Height: 180

Skiing career
- Sport: Alpine skiing ♂
- Disciplines: Slalom, combined, giant slalom, Downhill

Olympics
- Teams: 1
- Medals: 0 (0 gold)

World Championships
- Teams: 1
- Medals: 0 (0 gold)

World Cup
- Wins: 0
- Podiums: 1
- Updated on 11 January 2022

Peter Frei (born 6 August 1946 in Davos) is a Swiss former alpine skier who competed in the 1968 Winter Olympics.

== Career ==
He raced for the SC Davos.

At the Lauberhorn ski races in 1968 he skied with the number 162 on the fifth place at the slalom.

In the 1968–69 FIS Alpine Ski World Cup he was third at the slalom of the Lauberhorn ski races.

In January 1970 he won the slalom at the "Coupe Vitranc".

In the off-season he rides bicycle.

== Private ==
He was a civil engineer and his hobbies are mountain tours and swimming.
