= Reinhard Tritscher =

Austrian alpine skier (1946–2018)

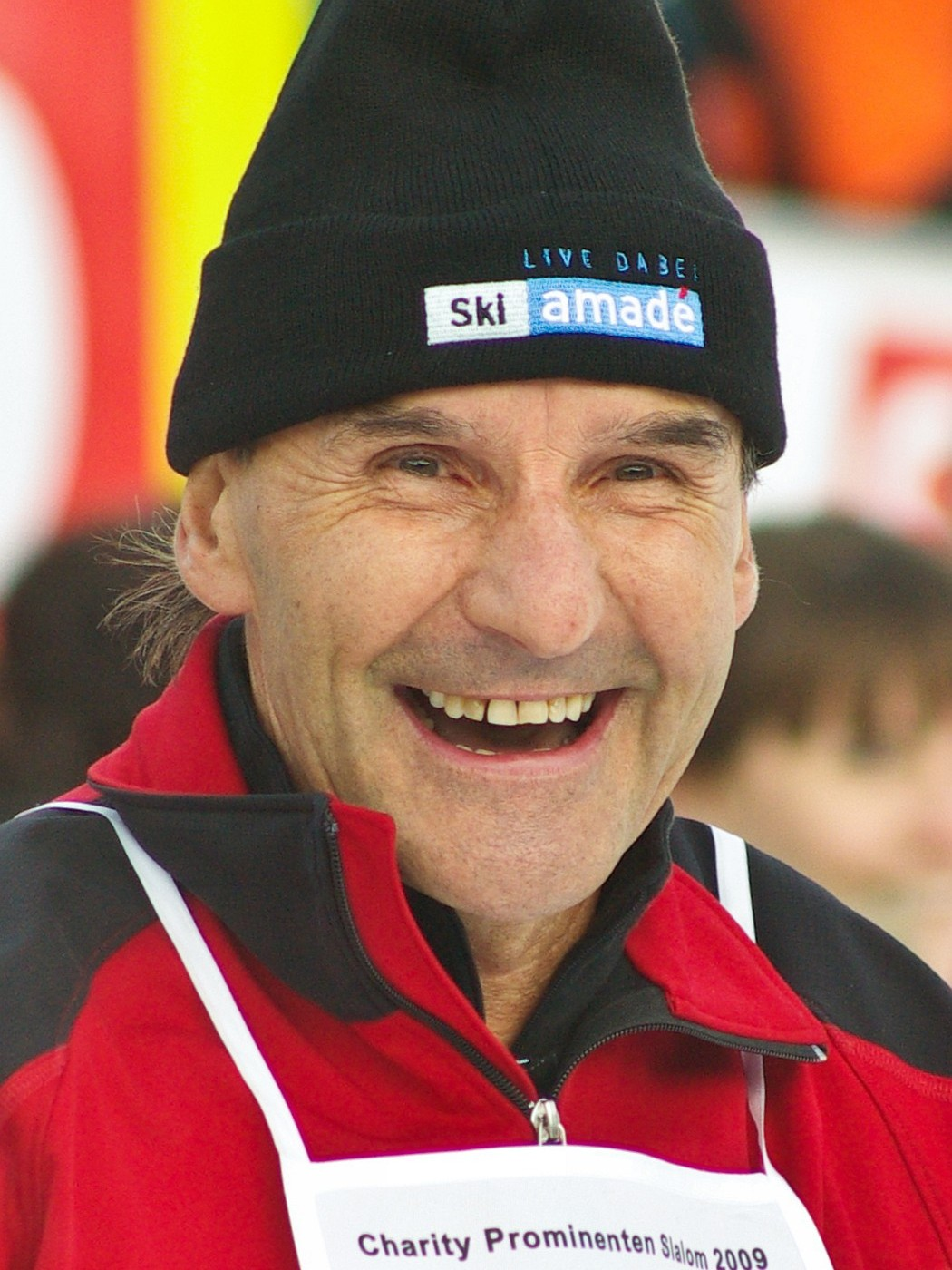
- Reinhard Tritscher in 2009

Personal information
- Born: 5 August 1946 Ramsau am Dachstein, Styria, Austria
- Died: 20 September 2018 (aged 72) Ramsau am Dachstein, Styria, Austria

Skiing career
- Sport: Alpine skiing

Olympics
- Teams: 1 – 1972

World Cup
- Wins: 4 – (1 DH, 2 GS, 1 S)
- Podiums: 8 – (2 DH, 5 GS, 1 S))

Reinhard Tritscher (5 August 1946 – 20 September 2018) was an Austrian alpine skier who competed in the 1972 Winter Olympics where he finished 8th in the giant slalom.

== Death ==
Tritscher's death on 20 September 2018 was a result of a climbing accident in Ramsau am Dachstein, Styria, at the age of 72.
