= Dumeng Giovanoli =

Swiss alpine skier (born 1941)

Medal record

Men's alpine skiing

Representing Switzerland

World Championships
Silver medal – second place	1968 Grenoble	Combined
Bronze medal – third place	1970 Görden/Val Gardena	Giant Slalom

Dumeng Giovanoli (born 23 January 1941) is a Swiss former alpine skier. In 1968, Giovanoli won the World Cup in Slalom. He also competed at the alpine skiing events at the 1964 and 1968 Winter Olympics.
