= Bernard Orcel =

French alpine skier (born 1945)

Bernard Orcel (born 2 April 1945) is a French former alpine skier who competed in the 1968 Winter Olympics and 1972 Winter Olympics.
