= Alfred Matt =

Austrian alpine skier (born 1948)

Medal record

Men's alpine skiing

Representing Austria

Olympic Games
Bronze medal – third place	1968 Grenoble	Slalom

Alfred Matt (born 11 May 1948) is an Austrian former alpine skier and Olympic medalist. He received a bronze medal in the slalom at the 1968 Winter Olympics in Grenoble. He also competed at the 1972 Winter Olympics.
