= Herbert Huber (skier) =

Austrian alpine skier (1944–1970)

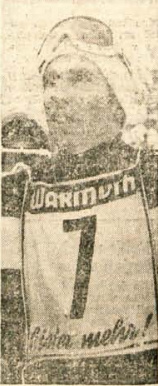

Personal information
- Born: 4 December 1944 Kitzbühel, Nazi Germany
- Died: 15 July 1970 (aged 25) Kitzbühel, Austria

Skiing career
- Sport: Alpine skiing
- Retired: 1970
- Disciplines: Technical events
- World Cup debut: 1967

Olympics
- Teams: 1
- Medals: 1

World Championships
- Teams: 1
- Medals: 1

World Cup
- Seasons: 4
- Wins: 3
- Podiums: 12
Medal record
Men's alpine skiing
Representing Austria
World Cup race podiums
Event	1st	2nd	3rd
Slalom	1	7	2
Giant slalom	2	0	0
Total	3	7	2
Olympic Games
Silver medal – second place	1968 Grenoble	Slalom

Herbert Huber (4 December 1944 - 15 July 1970) was an Austrian alpine skier and Olympic medalist. He received a silver medal in the slalom at the 1968 Winter Olympics in Grenoble.

== Death ==
Huber, who had a history of depression, committed suicide in 1970 in Kitzbühel.
