= Edmund Bruggmann =

Swiss alpine skier (1943–2014)

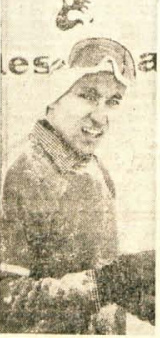

Personal information
- Born: 15 April 1943 Flums, Switzerland
- Died: 9 June 2014 (aged 71) Walenstadt, Switzerland
Medal record
Men's alpine skiing
Representing Switzerland
Olympic Games
Silver medal – second place	1972 Sapporo	Giant slalom

Edmund "Edy" Bruggmann (15 April 1943 – 9 June 2014) was a Swiss alpine skier. At the 1972 Winter Olympics, Bruggmann won the silver medal in Giant slalom.

He died of leukaemia on 9 June 2014.
