= Alain Penz =

French alpine skier (born 1947)

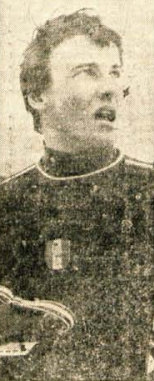

Personal information
- Born: 30 October 1947 (age 78) Sallanches, France

Skiing career
- Sport: Alpine skiing
- Retired: 1972
- Disciplines: Technical events
- World Cup debut: 1967

Olympics
- Teams: 2

World Championships
- Teams: 3

World Cup
- Seasons: 6
- Wins: 5
- Podiums: 12
- Discipline titles: 2
Medal record
Men's alpine skiing
Representing France
World Cup race podiums
Event	1st	2nd	3rd
Slalom	4	5	1
Giant slalom	1	0	1
Total	5	5	2

Alain Penz (born 30 October 1947 in Sallanches) is a French former alpine skier.

== Career ==
He competed in the 1968 Winter Olympics and 1972 Winter Olympics. He was the world no. 1 amateur slalom skier. He competed on the French team for the slalom World Cup, tying twice.
