= Jean-Pierre Augert =

French alpine skier (1946–1976)

Jean-Pierre Augert (13 January 1946 — 15 February 1976) was a French alpine skier who competed in the 1968 Winter Olympics.

== Personal life ==
Augert was married to French rally co-driver Michèle Petit.
