= 1970 Alpine Skiing World Cup – Men's downhill =

1970 Men's downhill World Cup
Previous: 1969	Next: 1971

Men's downhill World Cup 1969/1970

== Final point standings ==
In men's downhill World Cup 1969/70 the best 3 results count. Deductions are given in brackets.

Place	Name	Country	Total points	Deduction	2 (France)	7 (Switzerland)	12 (France)	17 (Germany)	20 (Italy)	21 (United States)
1	Karl Schranz	Austria	65	(25)	15	(8)	25	25	(11)	(6)
	Karl Cordin	Austria	65	(20)	-	20	-	20	(20)	25
3	Henri Duvillard	France	55	(3)	(3)	25	15	-	-	15
4	Malcolm Milne	Australia	48		25	-	-	-	15	8
5	Franz Vogler	West Germany	37		-	11	11	15	-	-
	Bernhard Russi	Switzerland	37		-	1	-	11	25	-
	Bernard Orcel	France	37		11	6	-	-	-	20
8	Heinrich Messner	Austria	35		-	15	20	-	-	-
9	Jean-Daniel Dätwyler	Switzerland	28	(3)	20	4	-	4	-	(3)
10	Jean-Luc Pinel	France	20	(3)	-	-	6	3	(3)	11
11	Josef Loidl	Austria	9		-	-	1	8	-	-
12	Mike Lafferty	United States	8		8	-	-	-	-	-
	Kurt Huggler	Switzerland	8		-	-	8	-	-	-
	Marcello Varallo	Italy	8		-	-	-	-	8	-
	Billy Kidd	United States	8		-	-	-	-	8	-
16	Rudi Sailer	Austria	7		-	3	-	-	4	-
	Rudd Pyles	United States	7		6	-	-	-	-	1
18	Andreas Sprecher	Switzerland	6		-	-	-	6	-	-
	Gerhard Nenning	Austria	6		-	-	4	2	-	-
20	David Zwilling	Austria	4		4	-	-	-	-	-
	Stefano Anzi	Italy	4		-	-	-	-	-	4
22	Keith Shepherd	Canada	3		-	-	3	-	-	-
	Bob Cochran	United States	3		-	-	3	-	-	-
24	Peter Rohr	Switzerland	2		2	-	-	-	-	-
	Roger Rossat-Mignod	France	2		-	2	-	-	-	-
	Anders Hansson	Sweden	2		-	-	-	-	2	-
	Rogers Little	United States	2		-	-	-	-	-	2
28	Bernard Grosfilley	France	1		1	-	-	-	-	-
	Hans Zingre	Switzerland	1		-	-	-	1	-	-
	Jon Terje Overland	Norway	1		-	-	-	-	1	-

Alpine Skiing World Cup
Men

Overall | Downhill | Giant slalom | Slalom

1970
