= Straddle (disambiguation) =

A straddle is a type of financial trading strategy using options. Straddle may also refer to:

- Straddle bets, a type of poker bet
- Straddle carrier, a large vehicle used to move containers around shipping ports
- Straddle position, a pose of the human body
- Straddle technique in high jump
- Straddle (skiing), a gate fault in ski racing
- Tax straddle, a technique for avoiding taxes
