= 1970 Alpine Skiing World Cup – Men's slalom =

1970 Men's slalom World Cup
Previous: 1969	Next: 1971

Men's slalom World Cup 1969/1970

Patrick Russel and Alain Penz shared the slalom title with maximum points, Jean-Noël Augert was third, and Henri Bréchu tied for fourth. All from France, these four won ten of the eleven slaloms; the other was taken by Gustav Thöni of Italy.

== Final point standings ==
In 1970, only the best three results counted; deductions are given in ().
Points were only awarded for top ten finishes (see scoring system).

Place	Name	Country	Total points	Deduction	4 (Austria)	5 (West Germany)	8 (Switzerland)	10 (Austria)	13 (France)	16 (Italy)	18 (Italy)	22 (United States)	24 (Canada)	25 (United States)	28 (Norway)
1	Patrick Russel	France	75	(80)	-	(20)	25	25	25	-	(20)	-	(15)	-	(25)
	Alain Penz	France	75	(37)	-	(3)	-	(6)	(20)	-	(8)	25	25	25	-
3	Jean-Noël Augert	France	70	(30)	25	(15)	-	(15)	-	-	25	-	-	-	20
4	Gustav Thöni	Italy	65	(57)	-	25	(11)	20	-	20	(11)	(15)	(20)	-	-
	Henri Bréchu	France	60	(40)	(8)	-	(15)	(2)	15	25	-	20	-	-	(15)
6	Dumeng Giovanoli	Switzerland	46	(23)	-	-	20	11	-	15	(6)	-	(11)	-	(6)
7	Heinrich Messner	Austria	31	(12)	-	(2)	-	-	(1)	8	-	8	(6)	15	(3)
8	Billy Kidd	United States	29	(4)	-	8	6	(4)	-	-	15	-	-	-	-
9	Harald Roffner	Austria	25		3	-	-	-	-	11	-	-	-	-	11
10	Rick Chaffee	United States	23		-	-	2	-	-	-	-	-	1	20	-
11	Max Rieger	West Germany	22	(1)	-	-	-	(1)	8	-	-	6	8	-	-
12	Herbert Huber	Austria	20		20	-	-	-	-	-	-	-	-	-	-
13	Karl Schranz	Austria	18	(4)	-	4	-	8	-	-	-	(4)	-	6	-
	Andrzej Bachleda	Poland	18	(1)	-	-	-	3	-	-	(1)	11	-	-	4
	Werner Bleiner	Austria	18		-	6	-	-	-	-	-	-	-	11	1
16	Spider Sabich	United States	17		15	-	-	-	-	-	-	2	-	-	-
17	Christian Neureuther	West Germany	16		-	-	1	-	11	4	-	-	-	-	-
18	Henri Duvillard	France	15		4	11	-	-	-	-	-	-	-	-	-
19	Peter Frei	Switzerland	14		6	-	-	-	4	-	4	-	-	-	-
20	David Zwilling	Austria	12		11	-	-	-	-	1	-	-	-	-	-
	Bob Cochran	United States	12		-	1	-	-	3	-	-	-	-	8	-
22	Heini Hemmi	Switzerland	10		-	-	8	-	-	2	-	-	-	-	-
23	Edmund Bruggmann	Switzerland	9		-	-	-	-	-	6	-	1	-	-	2
24	Walter Tresch	Switzerland	8		-	-	-	-	-	-	-	-	-	-	8
25	Eric Poulsen	United States	7		-	-	3	-	-	-	-	-	4	-	-
26	Olle Rolén	Sweden	6		-	-	-	-	6	-	-	-	-	-	-
27	Håkan Bjørge	Norway	5		-	-	-	-	2	-	3	-	-	-	-
	Bernard Orcel	France	5		2	-	-	-	-	-	-	-	-	3	-
29	Felice Denicolo	Italy	4		-	-	4	-	-	-	-	-	-	-	-
	Peter Duncan	Canada	4		-	-	-	-	-	-	-	-	-	4	-
31	Håkon Mjøen	Norway	3		-	-	-	-	-	3	-	-	-	-	-
	Hank Kashiwa	United States	3		-	-	-	-	-	-	-	3	-	-	-
	Otto Tschudi	Norway	3		-	-	-	-	-	-	-	-	3	-	-
34	Francisco Fernández Ochoa	Spain	2		-	-	-	-	-	-	2	-	-	-	-
	Jakob Tischhauser	Switzerland	2		-	-	-	-	-	-	-	-	2	-	-
	Paul Rachetto	United States	2		-	-	-	-	-	-	-	-	-	2	-
37	Bengt-Erik Grahn	Sweden	1		1	-	-	-	-	-	-	-	-	-	-
	Tyler Palmer	United States	1		-	-	-	-	-	-	-	-	-	1	-

Alpine Skiing World Cup
Men

Overall | Downhill | Giant slalom | Slalom

1970

== Bibliography ==
- fis-ski.com
