= 1971–72 FIS Alpine Ski World Cup =

International sports competition

FIS Alpine Ski World Cup 1971/72
Discipline	Men	Women
Overall	(Italy) Gustav Thöni	(Austria) Annemarie Pröll
Downhill	(Switzerland) Bernhard Russi	(Austria) Annemarie Pröll
Giant slalom	(Italy) Gustav Thöni	(Austria) Annemarie Pröll
Slalom	(France) Jean-Noël Augert	(France) Britt Lafforgue
Nations Cup	Switzerland	France
- Nations Cup overall: France

Competition
Locations	13	12
Individual	21	21
Cancelled	1	—

The 6th World Cup season began in December 1971 in Switzerland and concluded in March 1972 in France. Gustav Thöni of Italy won his second of three consecutive overall titles. Annemarie Pröll of Austria won the women's overall title, her second of five consecutive.

A break in the schedule in February was for the 1972 Winter Olympics in Sapporo, Japan. Prior to the Olympics, International Olympic Committee head Avery Brundage succeeded in having two-time men's overall World Cup champion Karl Schranz reclassified as a professional and therefore ineligible for the Olympics. Schranz retired from amateur competition immediately thereafter and joined the professional skiing tour in 1973.

The controversy over "professionalism" (based on endorsements, manufacturers' fees, et cetera) continued for two more seasons, and served to limit both participation and the number of events on the World Cup circuit. Prior to the 1975 season, Brundage's successor Lord Killanin led an effort that changed the rule to permit such payments to be made to national associations, which generally eliminated such disputes.

== Calendar ==
=== Men ===
Event key: DH – Downhill, SL – Slalom, GS – Giant slalom
Race	Season	Date	Place	Type	Winner	Second	Third
112	1	5 December 1971	(Switzerland) St. Moritz	DH _{030}	(Switzerland) Bernhard Russi	(Austria) Heinrich Messner	(Switzerland) Walter Tresch
113	2	9 December 1971	(France) Val d'Isère	GS _{039}	(Norway) Erik Håker	(France) Jean-Noël Augert	(France) Henri Duvillard
114	3	12 December 1971	(France) Val d'Isère	DH _{031}	(Austria) Karl Schranz	(Austria) Heinrich Messner	(Switzerland) Michael Dätwyler
115	4	19 December 1971	(Italy) Sestriere	SL _{045}	(United States) Tyler Palmer	(France) Jean-Noël Augert	(Austria) Harald Rofner
116	5	9 January 1972	(West Germany) Berchtesgaden	SL _{046}	(France) Henri Duvillard	(West Germany) Max Rieger	(Poland) Andrzej Bachleda
117	6	10 January 1972	(West Germany) Berchtesgaden	GS _{040}	(France) Roger Rossat-Mignod	(Italy) Gustav Thöni	(Switzerland) Walter Tresch
118	7	14 January 1972	(Austria) Kitzbühel	DH _{032}	(Austria) Karl Schranz	(France) Henri Duvillard	(Switzerland) Bernhard Russi
119	8	15 January 1972	(Austria) Kitzbühel	DH _{033}	(Austria) Karl Schranz	(France) Henri Duvillard	(Austria) Heinrich Messner
120	9	16 January 1972	(Austria) Kitzbühel	SL _{047}	(France) Jean-Noël Augert	(Switzerland) Edmund Bruggmann	(Poland) Andrzej Bachleda
121	10	23 January 1972	(Switzerland) Wengen	SL _{048}	(France) Jean-Noël Augert	(Italy) Gustav Thöni	(United States) Bob Cochran
122	11	24 January 1972	(Switzerland) Adelboden	GS _{041}	(Switzerland) Werner Mattle	(Switzerland) Adolf Rösti	(Italy) Gustav Thöni
1972 Winter Olympics (5–13 February)
123	12	18 February 1972	(Canada) Banff	GS _{042}	(Norway) Erik Håker	(West Germany) Sepp Heckelmiller	(Italy) Helmuth Schmalzl
124	13	19 February 1972	(Canada) Banff	SL _{049}	(Poland) Andrzej Bachleda	(France) Jean-Noël Augert	(Italy) Gustav Thöni
125	14	25 February 1972	(United States) Crystal Mountain	DH _{034}	(Switzerland) Bernhard Russi	(United States) Mike Lafferty	(Switzerland) Jean-Daniel Dätwyler
126	15	26 February 1972	(United States) Crystal Mountain	DH _{035}	(West Germany) Franz Vogler	(Switzerland) Bernhard Russi	(Switzerland) Jean-Daniel Dätwyler
127	16	2 March 1972	(United States) Heavenly Valley	GS _{043}	(Italy) Gustav Thöni	(France) Henri Duvillard	(Austria) David Zwilling
		4 March 1972	(United States) Heavenly Valley	SL _{cnx}	Cancelled: warm temperatures		
128	17	15 March 1972	(Italy) Val Gardena	DH _{036}	(Switzerland) Bernhard Russi	(Switzerland) René Berthod	(United States) Mike Lafferty
129	18	16 March 1972	(Italy) Val Gardena	GS _{044}	(Switzerland) Edmund Bruggmann	(Austria) Reinhard Tritscher	(Italy) Roland Thöni
130	19	17 March 1972	(Italy) Madonna di Campiglio	SL _{050}	(Italy) Roland Thöni	(France) Alain Penz	(Poland) Andrzej Bachleda
131	20	18 March 1972	(France) Pra-Loup	SL _{051}	(Italy) Roland Thöni	(Italy) Gustav Thöni	(Switzerland) Edmund Bruggmann
132	21	19 March 1972	(France) Pra-Loup	GS _{045}	(Switzerland) Edmund Bruggmann	(Italy) Gustav Thöni	(France) Roger Rossat-Mignod

Note:For the first time, the Olympic events no longer counted in the World Cup standings.

=== Ladies ===
Event key: DH – Downhill, SL – Slalom, GS – Giant slalom
Race	Season	Date	Place	Type	Winner	Second	Third
110	1	3 December 1971	(Switzerland) St. Moritz	DH _{026}	(Austria) Annemarie Pröll	(France) Françoise Macchi	(France) Jacqueline Rouvier
111	2	11 December 1971	(France) Val d'Isère	DH _{027}	(France) Jacqueline Rouvier	(Austria) Annemarie Pröll	(France) Françoise Macchi
112	3	17 December 1971	(Italy) Sestriere	DH _{028}	(Austria) Annemarie Pröll	(France) Jacqueline Rouvier	(France) Françoise Macchi
113	4	18 December 1971	(Italy) Sestriere	SL _{048}	(France) Françoise Macchi	(West Germany) Rosi Mittermaier	(Austria) Monika Kaserer
114	5	3 January 1972	(West Germany) Oberstaufen	GS _{038}	(France) Françoise Macchi	(Austria) Annemarie Pröll	(United States) Marilyn Cochran
115	6	4 January 1972	(West Germany) Oberstaufen	SL _{049}	(France) Françoise Macchi	(West Germany) Rosi Mittermaier	(France) Danièle Debernard
116	7	7 January 1972	(Socialist Federal Republic of Yugoslavia) Maribor	GS _{039}	(France) Françoise Macchi	(France) Michèle Jacot	(Austria) Annemarie Pröll
117	8	12 January 1972	(Austria) Badgastein	DH _{029}	(Austria) Annemarie Pröll	(Austria) Wiltrud Drexel	(France) Isabelle Mir
118	9	13 January 1972	(Austria) Badgastein	SL _{050}	(France) Britt Lafforgue	(France) Françoise Macchi	(Austria) Annemarie Pröll
119	10	18 January 1972	(Switzerland) Grindelwald	DH _{030}	(Austria) Annemarie Pröll	(Switzerland) Marie-Theres Nadig	(France) Isabelle Mir
120	11	19 January 1972	(Switzerland) Grindelwald	SL _{051}	(France) Britt Lafforgue	(Austria) Monika Kaserer	(United States) Barbara Ann Cochran
121	12	22 January 1972	(France) St. Gervais	GS _{040}	(Austria) Annemarie Pröll	(Austria) Monika Kaserer	(Switzerland) Marie-Theres Nadig
1972 Winter Olympics (5–13 February)
122	13	18 February 1972	(Canada) Banff	SL _{052}	(France) Britt Lafforgue	(United States) Barbara Ann Cochran	(France) Florence Steurer
123	14	19 February 1972	(Canada) Banff	GS _{041}	(Austria) Annemarie Pröll	(Austria) Wiltrud Drexel	(Austria) Monika Kaserer
124	15	25 February 1972	(United States) Crystal Mountain	DH _{031}	(Austria) Annemarie Pröll	(Austria) Wiltrud Drexel (Switzerland) Marie-Theres Nadig	
125	16	26 February 1972	(United States) Crystal Mountain	DH _{032}	(Austria) Wiltrud Drexel	(Austria) Annemarie Pröll	(Switzerland) Marie-Theres Nadig
126	17	1 March 1972	(United States) Heavenly Valley	GS _{042}	(Austria) Annemarie Pröll	(West Germany) Rosi Mittermaier	(France) Britt Lafforgue
127	18	3 March 1972	(United States) Heavenly Valley	SL _{053}	(France) Florence Steurer	(France) Michèle Jacot	(United States) Marilyn Cochran
128	19	17 March 1972	(France) Pra-Loup	SL _{054}	(France) Danièle Debernard	(West Germany) Pamela Behr	(West Germany) Rosi Mittermaier
129	20	18 March 1972	(France) Pra-Loup	GS _{043}	(France) Danièle Debernard	(Austria) Monika Kaserer	(Switzerland) Marie-Theres Nadig
130	21	18 March 1972	(France) Pra-Loup	GS _{044}	(France) Britt Lafforgue	(Austria) Annemarie Pröll	(Austria) Monika Kaserer

Note: for the first time, the Olympic events no longer counted in the World Cup standings.

== Men ==
=== Overall ===
In men's overall World Cup 1971/72 the best five downhills, best five giant slaloms and best five slaloms count. Four racers had a point deduction. Gustav Thöni won the cup with only one win!

Place	Name	Country	Total	DH	GS	SL
1	Gustav Thöni	Italy	154	4	84	66
2	Henri Duvillard	France	142	43	49	50
3	Edmund Bruggmann	Switzerland	140	0	78	62
4	Jean-Noël Augert	France	125	0	24	101
5	Bernhard Russi	Switzerland	114	110	4	0
6	Andrzej Bachleda	Poland	109	0	28	81
7	Roland Thöni	Italy	93	3	15	75
8	Karl Schranz	Austria	83	83	0	0
9	Mike Lafferty	United States	63	63	0	0
10	Heinrich Messner	Austria	61	61	0	0
11	Roger Rossat-Mignod	France	55	0	55	0
12	Erik Håker	Norway	50	0	50	0
13	Walter Tresch	Switzerland	49	19	26	4
14	Franz Vogler	West Germany	47	47	0	0
15	Alain Penz	France	46	0	18	28
	David Zwilling	Austria	46	0	38	8

=== Downhill ===
In men's downhill World Cup 1971/72 the best 5 results count. One racer had a point deduction, which is given in ().

Place	Name	Country	Total	1 (Switzerland)	3 (France)	7 (Austria)	8 (Austria)	14 (United States)	15 (United States)	17 (Italy)
1	Bernhard Russi	Switzerland	110	25	-	15	(11)	25	20	25
2	Karl Schranz	Austria	83	8	25	25	25	-	-	-
3	Mike Lafferty	United States	63	-	6	11	-	20	11	15
4	Heinrich Messner	Austria	61	20	20	-	15	-	-	6
5	Franz Vogler	West Germany	47	4	2	-	-	8	25	8
6	Henri Duvillard	France	43	-	3	20	20	-	-	-
7	Jean-Daniel Dätwyler	Switzerland	39	1	8	-	-	15	15	-
	Andreas Sprecher	Switzerland	39	-	1	-	8	11	8	11
9	Michel Dätwyler	Switzerland	37	11	15	-	-	6	3	2
10	René Berthod	Switzerland	32	3	-	-	-	3	6	20

=== Giant slalom ===
In men's giant slalom World Cup 1970/71 the best 5 results count. One racer had a point deduction, which is given in (). Gustav Thöni won the cup with only one win. He won his third Giant slalom World Cup in a row!

Place	Name	Country	Total	1 (France)	6 (West Germany)	11 (Switzerland)	12 (Canada)	16 (United States)	18 (Italy)	21 (France)
1	Gustav Thöni	Italy	84	-	20	15	-	25	4	20
2	Edmund Bruggmann	Switzerland	78	-	(2)	11	6	11	25	25
3	Roger Rossat-Mignod	France	55	1	25	6	8	-	-	15
4	Erik Håker	Norway	50	25	-	-	25	-	-	-
5	Henri Duvillard	France	49	15	-	-	-	20	3	11
6	David Zwilling	Austria	38	-	4	-	-	15	11	8
7	Alfred Hagn	West Germany	30	-	11	11	-	2	-	6
8	Sepp Heckelmiller	West Germany	28	-	-	-	20	8	-	-
	Adolf Rösti	Switzerland	28	-	-	20	2	6	-	-
	Andrzej Bachleda	Poland	28	11	8	2	-	3	-	4

=== Slalom ===
In men's slalom World Cup 1971/72 the best 5 results count. Three racers had a point deduction, which are given in ().

Place	Name	Country	Total	4 (Italy)	5 (West Germany)	9 (Austria)	10 (Switzerland)	13 (Canada)	19 (Italy)	20 (France)
1	Jean-Noël Augert	France	101	20	-	25	25	20	11	(1)
2	Andrzej Bachleda	Poland	81	(3)	15	15	11	25	15	-
3	Roland Thöni	Italy	75	11	-	6	8	-	25	25
4	Gustav Thöni	Italy	66	8	-	-	20	15	3	20
5	Edmund Bruggmann	Switzerland	62	(2)	11	20	-	8	8	15
6	Henri Duvillard	France	50	6	25	8	-	-	-	11
7	Alain Penz	France	28	-	8	-	-	-	20	-
8	Tyler Palmer	United States	25	25	-	-	-	-	-	-
9	Eberhard Schmalzl	Italy	24	-	3	11	-	4	6	-
10	Max Rieger	West Germany	20	-	20	-	-	-	-	-

== Ladies ==
=== Overall ===
In women's overall World Cup 1971/72 the best five downhills, best five giant slaloms and best five slaloms count. Three racers had a point deduction. Annemarie Pröll won eight races and was only unable to score points in four slaloms.

Place	Name	Country	Total	DH	GS	SL
1	Annemarie Pröll	Austria	269	125	115	29
2	Françoise Macchi	France	187	67	50	70
3	Britt Lafforgue	France	128	0	52	76
4	Monika Kaserer	Austria	120	7	76	37
5	Marie-Theres Nadig	Switzerland	111	71	37	3
6	Rosi Mittermaier	West Germany	110	12	32	66
7	Wiltrud Drexel	Austria	102	76	22	4
8	Florence Steurer	France	96	0	26	70
9	Danièle Debernard	France	90	0	28	62
10	Isabelle Mir	France	89	63	11	15
11	Michèle Jacot	France	70	12	27	31
12	Barbara Ann Cochran	United States	67	0	10	57
	Marilyn Cochran	United States	67	1	44	22
14	Jacqueline Rouvier	France	60	60	0	0
15	Pamela Behr	West Germany	29	0	0	29

=== Downhill ===
In women's downhill World Cup 1971/72 the best 5 results count. Three racers had a point deduction, which are given in (). Annemarie Pröll won the cup with maximum points.

Place	Name	Country	Total	1 (Switzerland)	2 (France)	3 (Italy)	8 (Austria)	10 (Switzerland)	15 (United States)	16 (United States)
1	Annemarie Pröll	Austria	125	25	(20)	25	25	25	25	(20)
2	Wiltrud Drexel	Austria	76	-	11	-	20	-	20	25
3	Marie-Theres Nadig	Switzerland	71	(6)	8	8	(8)	20	20	15
4	Françoise Macchi	France	67	20	15	15	6	11	-	-
5	Isabelle Mir	France	63	11	(4)	11	15	15	(8)	11
6	Jacqueline Rouvier	France	60	15	25	20	-	-	-	-
7	Susie Corrock	United States	15	-	-	-	1	3	3	8
8	Bernadette Zurbriggen	Switzerland	14	-	-	-	-	-	11	3
9	Brigitte Totschnig	Austria	13	-	2	3	-	8	-	-
10	Rosi Mittermaier	West Germany	12	4	-	6	2	-	-	-
	Michèle Jacot	France	12	-	-	-	11	-	-	1

=== Giant slalom ===
In women's giant slalom World Cup 1971/72 the best 5 results count. Only Annemarie Pröll had a point deduction, which is given in (). She won the cup by winning three races. All other events were won by French athletes.

Place	Name	Country	Total	5 (West Germany)	7 (Socialist Federal Republic of Yugoslavia)	12 (France)	14 (Canada)	17 (United States)	20 (France)	21 (France)
1	Annemarie Pröll	Austria	115	20	(15)	25	25	25	(3)	20
2	Monika Kaserer	Austria	76	-	6	20	15	-	20	15
3	Britt Lafforgue	France	52	-	-	-	1	15	11	25
4	Françoise Macchi	France	50	25	25	-	-	-	-	-
5	Marilyn Cochran	United States	44	15	-	6	-	11	6	6
6	Marie-Theres Nadig	Switzerland	37	-	3	15	-	-	15	4
7	Rosi Mittermaier	West Germany	32	-	-	4	-	20	-	8
8	Danièle Debernard	France	28	-	-	-	-	-	25	3
9	Michèle Jacot	France	27	3	20	-	3	-	-	1
10	Florence Steurer	West Germany	26	-	1	8	11	4	2	-

=== Slalom ===
In women's slalom World Cup 1971/72 the best 5 results count. No racer had a point deduction. Britt Lafforgue won the cup with only four results.

Place	Name	Country	Total	4 (Italy)	6 (West Germany)	9 (Austria)	11 (Switzerland)	13 (Canada)	18 (United States)	19 (France)
1	Britt Lafforgue	France	76	-	-	25	25	25	-	1
2	Françoise Macchi	France	70	25	25	20	-	-	-	-
	Florence Steurer	France	70	-	11	-	8	15	25	11
4	Rosi Mittermaier	West Germany	66	20	20	-	-	11	-	15
5	Danièle Debernard	France	62	-	15	11	11	-	-	25
6	Barbara Ann Cochran	United States	57	-	3	8	15	20	11	-
7	Monika Kaserer	Austria	37	15	2	-	20	-	-	-
8	Michèle Jacot	France	31	11	-	-	-	-	20	-
9	Pamela Behr	West Germany	29	-	-	-	3	-	6	20
	Annemarie Pröll	Austria	29	-	8	15	-	-	-	6

== Nations Cup ==
=== Overall ===
Place	Country	Total	Men	Ladies
1	France	1159	376	783
2	Austria	900	297	603
3	Switzerland	689	549	140
4	United States	333	125	208
5	West Germany	326	151	175
6	Italy	308	307	1
7	Poland	112	112	0
8	Canada	66	2	64
9	Norway	58	52	6
10	Spain	37	23	14
11	Australia	9	9	0
12	United Kingdom	6	0	6
13	Liechtenstein	1	0	1

=== Men ===
Place	Country	Total	DH	GS	SL	Racers	Wins
1	Switzerland	549	295	170	84	13	6
2	France	376	44	146	186	6	4
3	Italy	307	12	129	166	8	3
4	Austria	297	184	79	34	10	3
5	West Germany	151	47	61	43	6	1
6	United States	125	74	6	45	6	1
7	Poland	112	0	28	84	1	1
8	Norway	52	0	50	2	2	2
9	Spain	23	0	0	23	2	0
10	Australia	9	9	0	0	1	0
11	Canada	2	2	0	0	1	0

=== Ladies ===
Place	Country	Total	DH	GS	SL	Racers	Wins
1	France	783	218	212	353	11	12
2	Austria	603	270	247	86	8	9
3	United States	208	27	76	105	9	0
4	West Germany	175	20	55	100	4	0
5	Switzerland	140	99	38	3	3	0
6	Canada	64	30	34	0	5	0
7	Spain	14	0	2	12	1	0
8	Norway	6	6	0	0	1	0
	United Kingdom	6	0	0	6	1	0
10	Italy	1	0	1	0	1	0
	Liechtenstein	1	0	1	0	1	0

== Medal table ==
Rank	Nation	Gold	Silver	Bronze	Total
1	France	16	12	10	38
2	Austria	12	13	8	33
3	Switzerland	6	5	10	21
4	Italy	3	4	4	11
5	Norway	2	0	0	2
6	Germany	1	6	1	8
7	United States	1	2	5	8
8	Poland	1	0	3	4
Totals (8 entries)		42	42	41	125
