= Mount Bachelor ski area =

Ski area in Oregon, United States

Mount Bachelor

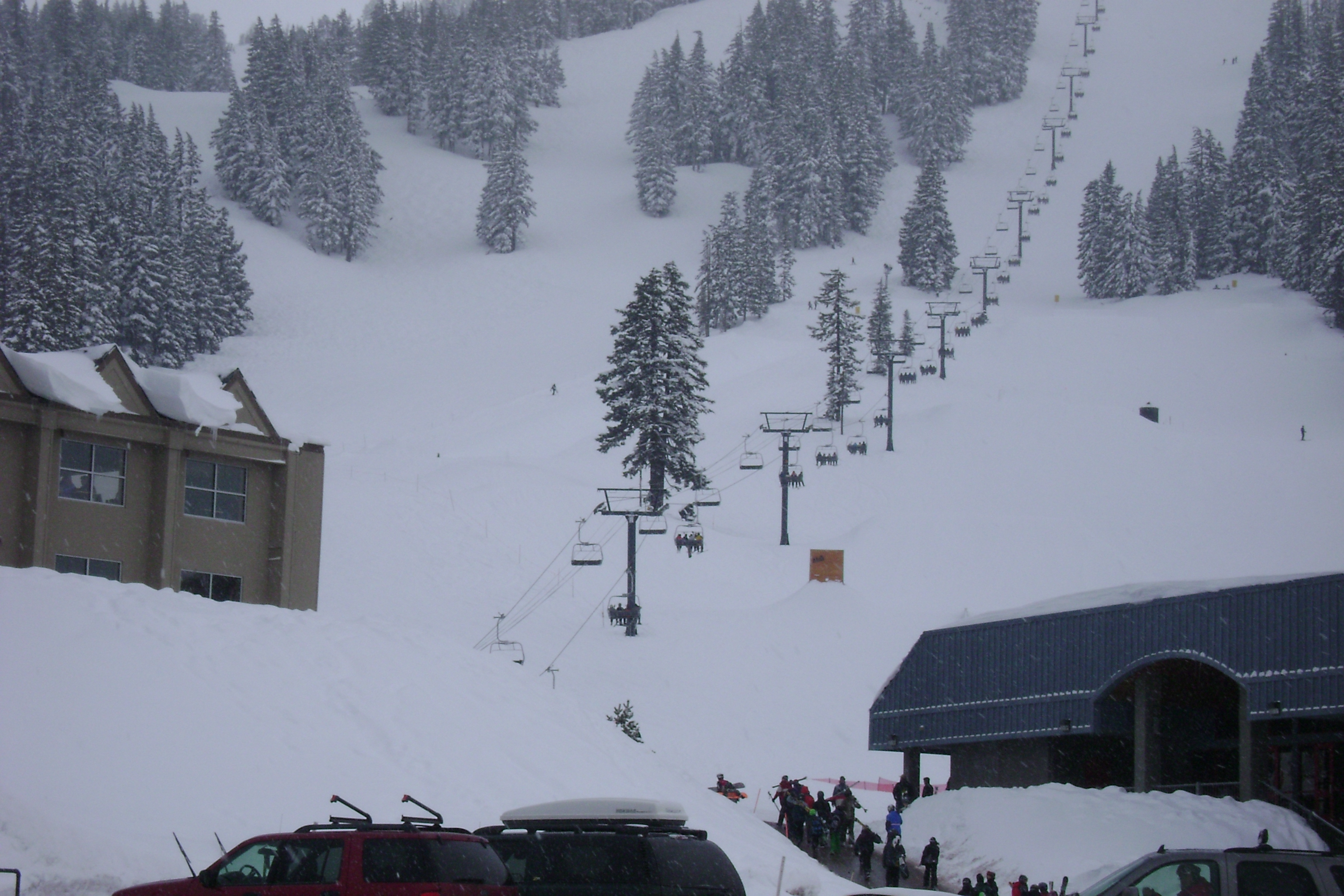
- Pine Marten Express chairlift in 2009

- Location in the United States Location in Oregon
- Location: Deschutes County, Oregon, United States
- Mountain: Mount Bachelor
- Nearest city: Bend: 22 mi (35 km) east
- Coordinates: 44.003°N 121.677°W
- Status: Operating
- Owner: POWDR
- Vertical: 3,365 ft (1,026 m) lift-served
- Top elevation: 9,065 ft (2,763 m); Summit Express
- Base elevation: 5,700 ft (1,737 m); Northwest Express; 6,350 ft (1,940 m); Pine Marten Express
- Skiable area: 4,323 acres (17.5 km^{2})
- Trails: 101 total: 15% novice; 35% intermediate; 30% advanced; 20% expert
- Longest run: 4 miles (6.4 km)
- Lift system: 12 total (9 high speed quads, 3 fixed grip triples, 3 surface lifts)
- Terrain parks: 15
- Snowfall: 462 inches (38.5 ft; 11.7 m)
- Snowmaking: Yes
- Night skiing: No
- Website: mtbachelor.com

Mount Bachelor ski resort (stylized as Mt. Bachelor) is a ski resort in the northwest United States located in Central Oregon, approximately 22 miles (35 km) west of Bend, along Century Drive Highway. The ski area is on the northern side of Mount Bachelor, a stratovolcano rising atop a volcanic shield in the Cascade Range.

Since 2001, the ski area has been owned by Powdr Corporation of Park City, Utah. It is the largest ski resort (by area) by more than 1,000 acres (4.0 km^{2}) in Oregon, the second largest single-mountain ski resort in the U.S., behind Vail in Colorado, and the sixth largest of all ski resorts in the nation.

Mount Bachelor offers one of the nation's longest ski seasons, mid-November through the end of May (weather permitting).

== History ==
The Mount Bachelor Ski Area was founded by former 10th Mountain Division Elite Force ski trooper Bill Healy on December 19, 1958, with $75,000 (equivalent to $837,000 today) and a one-year lease from the U.S. Forest Service for the land. The four other major stockholders were Felix Marcoulier, Dr. Bradford Pease, Oscar Murray, and Phil Gould. The founders raised $100,000 from local investors and made many important management decisions that would shape the path of Mount Bachelor and Central Oregon for decades to come.

The ski area opened as Bachelor Butte in October 1958 with a rope tow and a 3,100-foot (940 m)-long platter lift rising 1,000 ft (305 m); a lift ticket was three dollars (equivalent to $33.48 today). The name of the volcano was changed to Mount Bachelor in 1983 after the Bend Chamber of Commerce persuaded state and federal officials to adopt the more descriptive term "mountain." Well-known broadcaster and avid skier Lowell Thomas visited the young ski area in 1961, flying over from Sun Valley with agribusiness magnate J. R. Simplot.

The first chairlift was "black chair" in 1961, shortly followed by "red chair" in 1964. In 1967 and 1970, the yellow and blue chairlifts were added, and in 1973 the green and orange chairlifts were added. The "Outback chair" was added in 1976, "Rainbow" in 1980, and "Sunrise" in 1982. The first area of the mountain developed for skiing was the northeastern side. The northwestern side was not lift-served in 1973, but those who ventured for the "Outback Trail Tour" paid a dollar in advance and got a return ride by a snowcat to the lodge. A new trail was finished in 1975, and the Outback double chairlift was installed at a cost of $700,000. It was replaced by the $3 million high-speed quad (Outback Express) in the summer of 1987; with a capacity of 2,800 passengers per hour. The 8,377-foot (1.6 mi; 2.6 km)-long Northwest Express chairlift was added in 1996, a high-speed quad with 2,365-foot (721 m) vertical. This lift further expanded the terrain to the west and increased the resort's overall vertical, lowering the minimum lift-served elevation to 5,700 feet (1,740 m).

In 1976, Mount Bachelor had a severe drought and was only open January 2 through February 14, and February 26 through April 30. There was a loss of an estimated $4 million which took four years to recover. Following the drought, the Nordic initiative began and the main lodge expanded.

Plans for the first summit chairlift were announced in autumn 1979; the high-speed detachable triple was installed in the summer of 1983. At the time, it was just the second detachable chairlift installed in the world. It was upgraded to a quad in 1997. Original plans for a summit lodge and an accompanying service road were abandoned in 1982 to attain approval from the U.S. Forest Service.

Due to its challenging terrain parks and excellent snow conditions, Mount Bachelor is the official home training resort of many professional and Winter Olympic athletes, and hosts several professional USSA competitions each year.

On April 4, 1968, a single-engine light airplane crashed on the slopes of Mount Bachelor with three fatalities. Bound for Eugene from Boise and Billings, it was found three days later at the 8,100-foot (2,470 m) level by skiers after a multi-day regional air search in limited visibility.

== Terrain ==
The mountain is famous for its getting heavy amounts of snow off the Pacific Ocean, unfortunately, quite often the snow is quite wet and heavy, with typical snowfall of over 462 inches (1,170 cm) per year and a mid-winter base over 150 inches (380 cm). The resort boasts a lift-served vertical drop of 3,365 feet (1,026 m) with a lift running to 9,000 feet (2,743 m), just 65 feet (20 m) below the volcano's summit, which is accessible via a short hike. As one of the tallest mountains in the vicinity, Mount Bachelor often experiences high wind speeds causing the chairlift to the summit to be put on standby.

== Trails and lifts ==
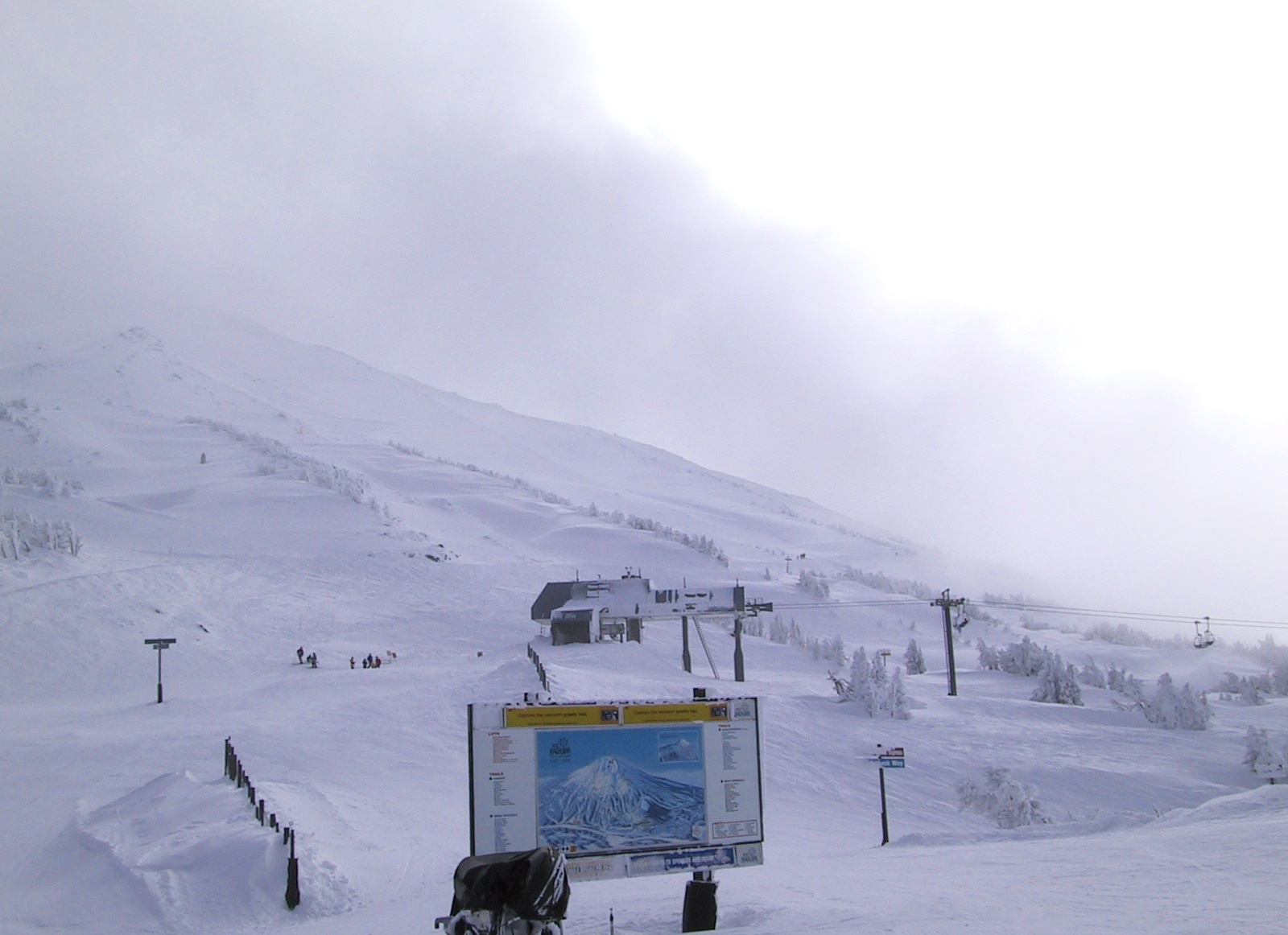
Ski area in the winter

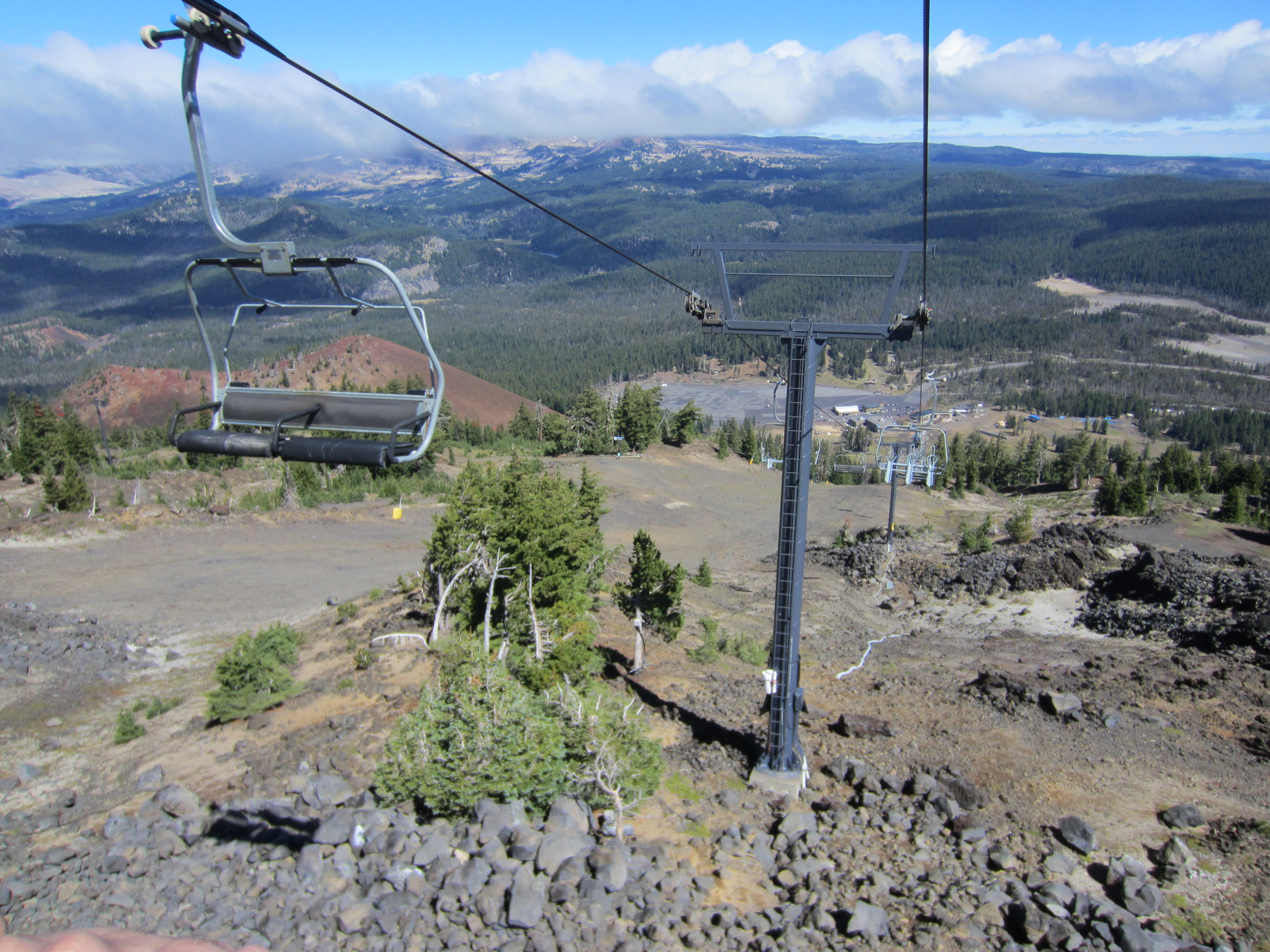
Chairlift in the summer

Total lift accessible area is 4,323 acres (17.5 km^{2}) with approximately 1,600 acres (6.5 km^{2}) groomed daily. The longest run is just over 4 miles (6.4 km). There are 12 chairlifts: Alpenglow, Early Riser, Northwest Express, Outback Express, Pine Marten Express, Rainbow Chair, Red Chair, Skyliner Express, Summit Express, Sunrise Express, Little Pine, and Cloudchaser. Northwest Express, Outback Express, Pine Marten Express, Skyliner Express, Summit Express, Sunrise Express, and Little Pine are express quads.

Following the Summit triple in 1983, the Pine Marten was the first express quad, installed in the summer of 1986. The accompanying lodge at the top of Pine Marten was built two years later. The Pine Marten Express was the world's first height-adjustable detachable quad. It was overhauled in 2006 for $3.5 million, with new terminals, cable, and all new moving parts. The Outback Express was installed in 1987 and the Skyliner Express in 1989.

Mount Bachelor has outlined in its master plan that it intends to replace its Sunrise Express to a high-speed six-pack, along with replacing its Rainbow triple chairlift with a high-speed quad. In addition, the ski area plans to expand its downhill mountain bike terrain.

In the early 1990s, Mount Bachelor had intentions of installing an 8 passenger high speed gondola which would run from the Sunriver access road. However, while marketed in ski magazines, this gondola was never built.

In recent years, Mount Bachelor has made sweeping efforts to attract freestyle skiers and snowboarders. A 400-foot (122 m) super pipe is among the best on the continent, and hosted the 2006 USSA Olympic Qualifier. The resort's Bachelor Parks terrain park encompasses 3 parks, is nearly a mile (1.5 km) long, descending 850 vertical feet (260 m) and featuring a number of jumps, rails, boxes, and jibs for freestyle riders. Other parks include "Slopestyle Arena", and "Sunshine Park" for beginners.

In 2003, Transworld Snowboarding magazine (editors & readers) ranked Bachelor as the fourth best snowboarding resort in North America.

Mount Bachelor also has a cross country skiing area with 12 groomed trails covering 35 miles (56 km) and 850 feet (260 m) of vertical.

== Activities ==
Skiing/ Snowboarding

Mount Bachelor offers lift accessed skiing and snowboarding seven days a week from late-November to the end of May. Hours are generally 9:00 a.m. to 4:00 p.m. On nice weather days Mount Bachelor offers skiing 360 degrees off the summit of the mountain. Bachelor holds some of the driest snow relative to the Cascades. The mountain's wide variety of elevation and aspect allows skiers and snowboarders to find good snow nearly every day of the season. Many avid skiers and snowboarders can access a bulge on the north side of the mountain referred to as 'the cone' by hiking before, during and after the resorts typical hours of operation.

Nordic skiing

Mount Bachelor has the longest groomed Nordic season in North America, running from late-November through late-May. Snow conditions may extend into June.

Mountain bike park

Starting in the summer of 2013, Mount Bachelor was granted a special use permit from the Forest Service allowing chairlift for downhill mountain bike laps. Mountain bike trail continue to be developed, varying from a family-friendly single track trail to "bad to the bone" downhill bike park. In addition, a zip-line system was installed in 2020 and is a three-span dual line system that spans over 1.3 miles. It offers panoramic views of the Three Sisters Wilderness and is considered the highest-elevation, steepest, and fastest in the Pacific Northwest, starting at 7,800 feet and descending nearly 1,400 vertical feet.

Other features at Mount Bachelor include snowshoeing, dog sledding, and on-mountain interpretive tours. Seven restaurants, three bars, and three coffeehouses on the premises are distributed in three day lodges. Additional accommodations and lodging are nearby at Sunriver and in the city of Bend.

Hiking

In the summer of 2024, Mt. Bachelor opened the Evergreen Trail, its first multi-use trail for both hikers and mountain bikers. Roughly 4.5 miles in length, this free and beginner friendly trail connects West Village with the Pine Marten Lodge. The trail features a 5% grade with a wide variety of scenic views.

== U.S. Ski Team ==
- Kiki Cutter (b. 1949), five World Cup victories, 1968 Olympian, runner-up in World Cup slalom standings and fourth overall in 1969
- Tommy Ford (b. 1989), World Cup racer, 2010 Olympian, eight U.S. Alpine titles
- Mike Lafferty, (b. 1948), 1972 Olympian, third in World Cup downhill standings and ninth overall in 1972
- Laurenne Ross (b. 1988), World Cup racer, 10th in downhill at the 2011 World Championships
