= 1970 Alpine Skiing World Cup – Men's giant slalom =

1970 Men's giant slalom World Cup
Previous: 1969	Next: 1971

Men's giant slalom World Cup 1969/1970

== Final point standings ==
In men's giant slalom World Cup 1969/70 the best 3 results count. Deductions are given in brackets. Gustav Thöni won the cup with maximum points.

Place	Name	Country	Total points	Deduction	1 (France)	3 (Austria)	6 (Switzerland)	9 (Austria)	11 (Socialist Federal Republic of Yugoslavia)	14 (Italy)	15 (Italy)	19 (Italy)	23 (Canada)	26 (United States)	27 (Norway)
1	Gustav Thöni	Italy	75	(26)	25	(20)	-	(6)	-	25	25	-	-	-	-
2	Dumeng Giovanoli	Switzerland	70	(39)	-	(3)	(15)	25	25	20	-	(15)	(2)	-	(4)
	Patrick Russel	France	70	(68)	20	25	(11)	(8)	(20)	-	-	(3)	(15)	25	(11)
4	Karl Schranz	Austria	65	(44)	-	(6)	25	(15)	-	-	-	25	(8)	15	(15)
	Werner Bleiner	Austria	65	(61)	(4)	(11)	(4)	-	(3)	(8)	(11)	20	20	(20)	25
6	Jean-Noël Augert	France	50	(21)	15	(1)	(3)	(2)	-	15	(15)	-	-	-	20
7	Alain Penz	France	44	(13)	-	-	8	(3)	-	-	-	(2)	25	11	(8)
8	Jakob Tischhauser	Switzerland	37	(20)	-	15	-	(4)	(8)	11	(8)	-	11	-	-
9	Andrzej Bachleda	Poland	32	(10)	-	(4)	-	20	(4)	(2)	6	6	-	-	-
10	Edmund Bruggmann	Switzerland	31		-	-	-	11	-	-	20	-	-	-	-
11	Sepp Heckelmiller	West Germany	29		-	-	20	-	-	-	3	-	-	-	6
12	Max Rieger	West Germany	23		-	-	-	-	-	6	-	11	6	-	-
13	Kurt Schnider	Switzerland	19	(2)	11	-	-	-	-	-	4	4	-	-	(2)
14	Georges Mauduit	France	18		-	-	-	-	15	3	-	-	-	-	-
15	Heinrich Messner	Austria	15		-	-	-	-	-	-	-	11	3	-	1
16	Heini Hemmi	Switzerland	11		-	-	-	-	11	-	-	-	-	-	-
	Henri Duvillard	France	11		-	8	-	-	-	-	-	-	-	-	3
18	Bernard Orcel	France	10		3	-	-	-	-	-	-	-	1	6	-
19	Billy Kidd	United States	8		8	-	-	-	-	-	-	-	-	-	-
	Christian Neureuther	West Germany	8		6	-	-	-	2	-	-	-	-	-	-
	Hank Kashiwa	United States	8		-	-	-	-	-	-	-	-	-	-	8
22	Peter Duncan	Canada	7		-	-	-	-	-	-	-	-	4	3	-
23	Jean-Pierre Augert	France	6		-	-	6	-	-	-	-	-	-	-	-
	Walter Tresch	Switzerland	6		-	-	-	-	6	-	-	-	-	-	-
25	David Zwilling	Austria	5		-	-	-	-	-	4	1	-	-	-	-
26	Eric Poulsen	United States	4		-	-	-	-	-	-	-	-	-	4	-
27	Henri Bréchu	France	2		2	-	-	-	-	-	-	-	-	-	-
	Herbert Huber	Austria	2		-	2	-	-	-	-	-	-	-	-	-
	Pierre Lorenzo Clataud	Italy	2		-	-	2	-	-	-	-	-	-	-	-
	Harald Roffner	Austria	2		1	-	-	-	1	-	-	-	-	-	-
	Eberhard Schmalzl	Italy	2		-	-	-	-	-	2	-	-	-	-	-
	Spider Sabich	United States	2		-	-	-	-	-	-	2	-	-	-	-
	Rick Chaffee	United States	2		-	-	-	-	-	-	-	-	-	2	-
34	Adolf Rösti	Switzerland	1		-	-	1	-	-	-	-	-	-	-	-
	Kurt Huggler	Switzerland	1		-	-	-	1	-	-	-	-	-	-	-
	Erik Håker	Norway	1		-	-	-	-	-	-	-	1	-	-	-
	Tyler Palmer	United States	1		-	-	-	-	-	-	-	-	-	1	-

Alpine Skiing World Cup
Men

Overall | Downhill | Giant slalom | Slalom

1970
