= Slalom skiing =

Alpine skiing discipline

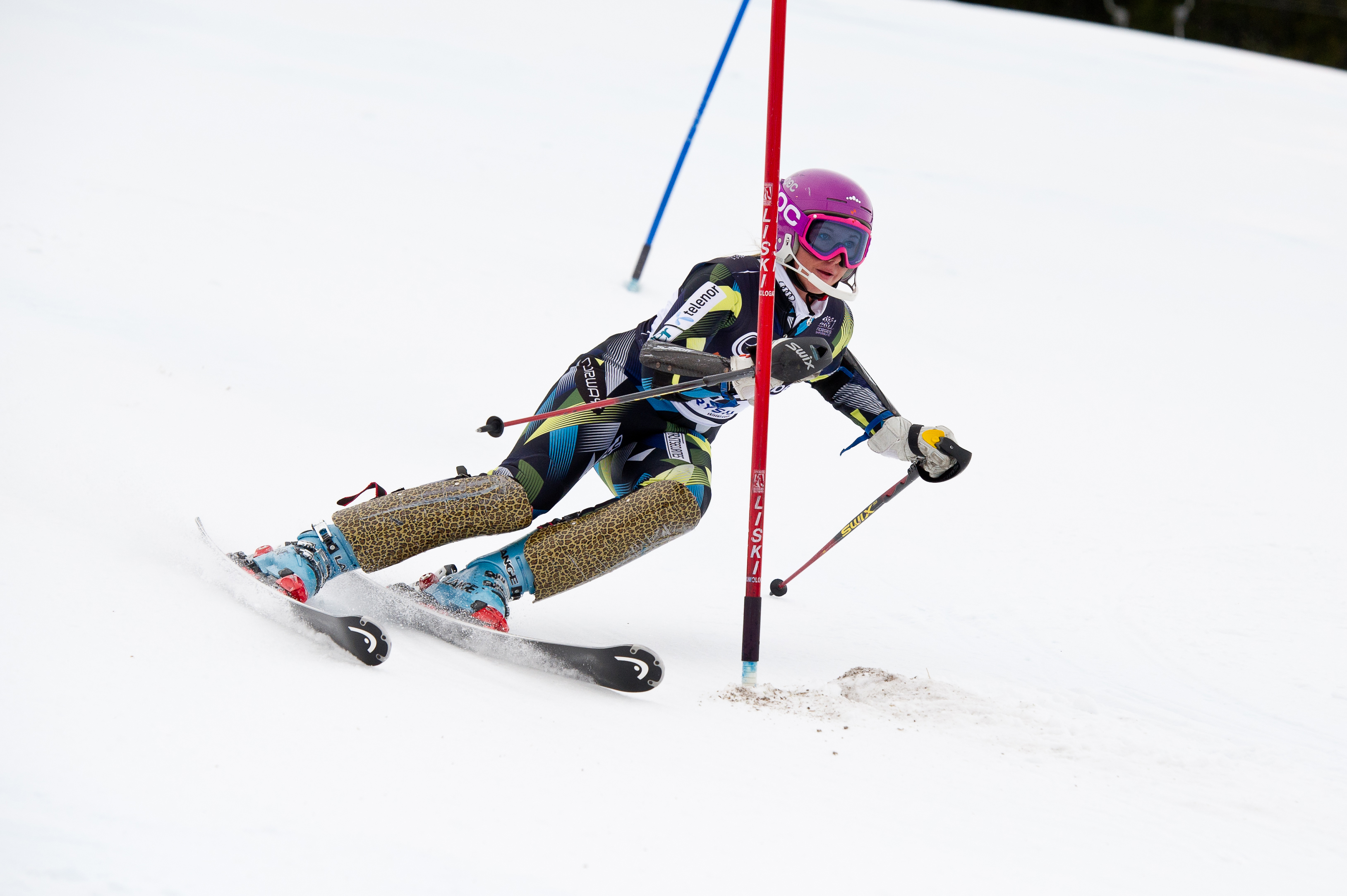
Tonje Sekse competes in the slalom

Slalom is an alpine skiing and alpine snowboarding discipline, involving skiing between poles or gates. These are spaced more closely than those in giant slalom, super giant slalom and downhill, necessitating quicker and shorter turns. Internationally, the sport is contested at the FIS Alpine World Ski Championships, and at the Olympic Winter Games.

== History ==
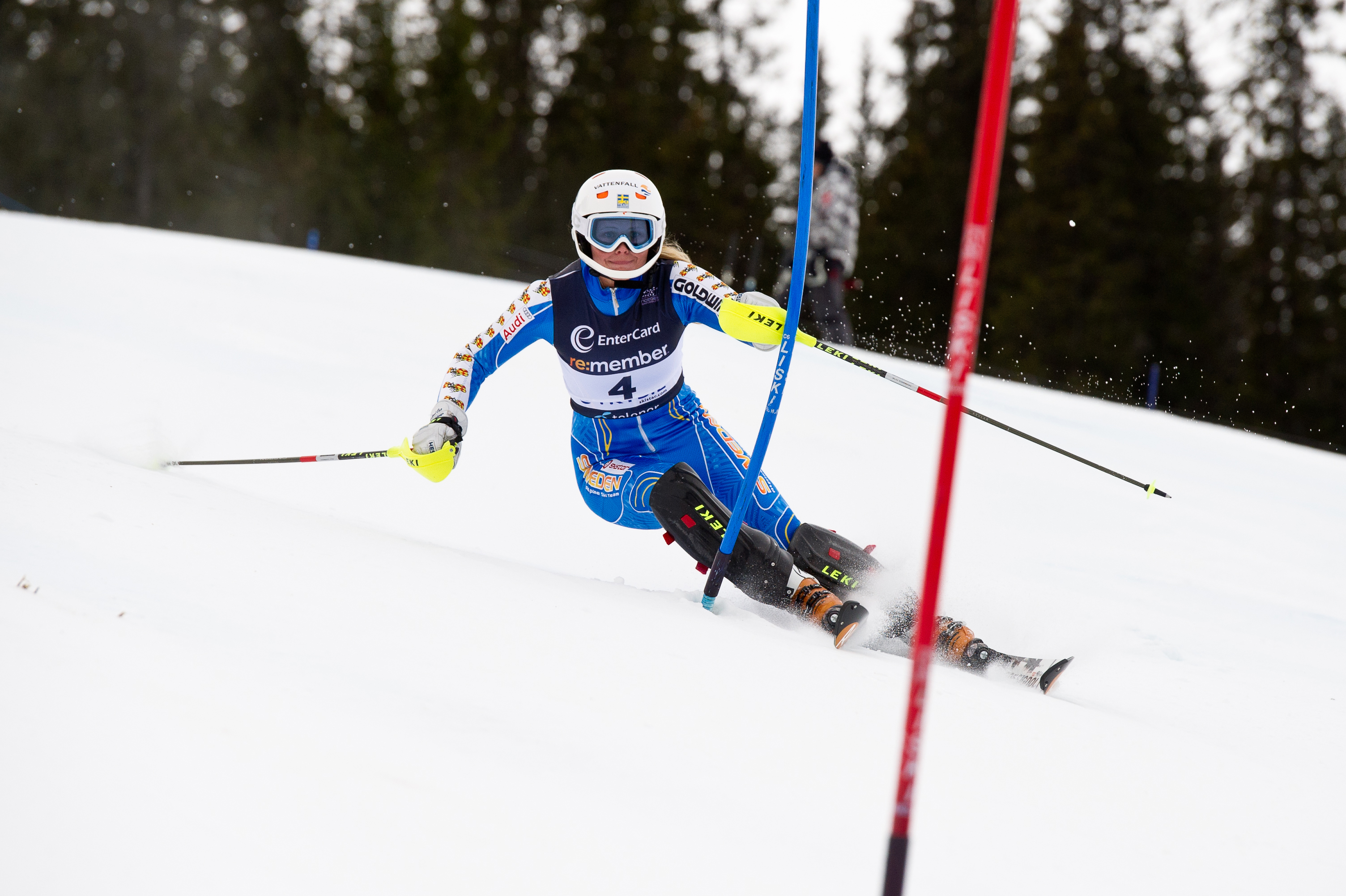
Nathalie Eklund skis slalom at Trysil Municipality, Norway in 2011

The term slalom comes from the Morgedal/Seljord dialect of the Norwegian word "slalåm": "sla", meaning "slightly inclining hillside", and "låm", meaning "track after skis". The inventors of modern skiing classified their trails according to their difficulty:

- Slalåm was a trail used in Telemark by boys and girls not yet able to try themselves on the more challenging runs.
- Ufsilåm was a trail with one obstacle (ufse) like a jump, a fence, a difficult turn, a gorge, a cliff (often more than 10 metres (33 ft) high), et cetera.
- Uvyrdslåm was a trail with several obstacles.

A Norwegian military downhill competition in 1767 included racing downhill among trees "without falling or breaking skis". Sondre Norheim and other skiers from Telemark practiced uvyrdslåm or "disrespectful/reckless downhill" where they raced downhill in difficult and untested terrain (i.e., off piste). The 1866 "ski race" in Oslo was a combined cross-country, jumping and slalom competition. In the slalom participants were allowed use poles for braking and steering, and they were given points for style (appropriate skier posture). During the late 19th century Norwegian skiers participated in all branches (jumping, slalom, and cross-country) often with the same pair of skis. Slalom and variants of slalom were often referred to as hill races. Around 1900 hill races were abandoned in the Oslo championships at Huseby and Holmenkollen. Mathias Zdarsky's development of the Lilienfeld binding helped change hill races into a specialty of the Alps region.

The rules for the modern slalom were developed by Arnold Lunn in 1922 for the British National Ski Championships, and adopted for alpine skiing at the 1936 Winter Olympics. Under these rules gates were marked by pairs of flags rather than single ones, were arranged so that the racers had to use a variety of turn lengths to negotiate them, and scoring was on the basis of time alone, rather than on both time and style.

== Course ==
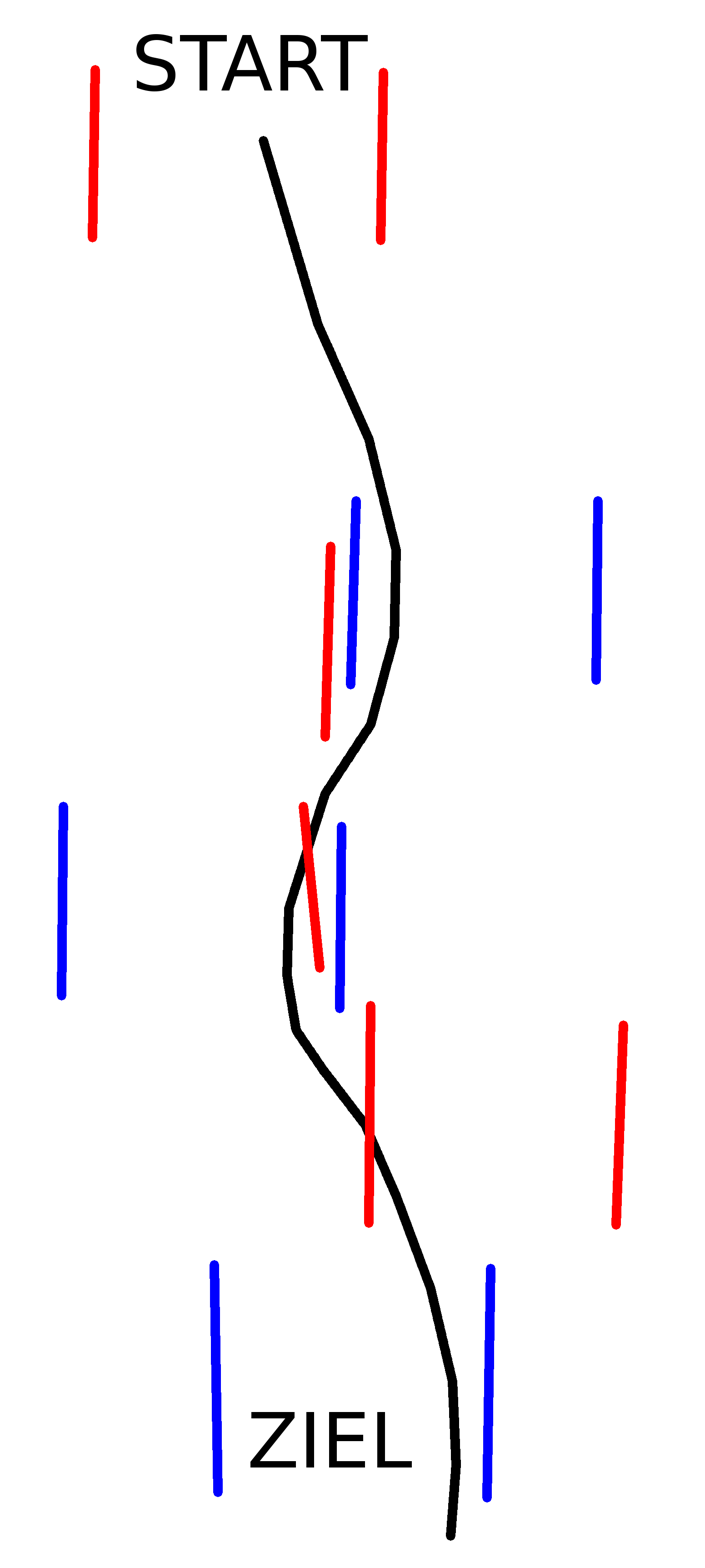
Example of a slalom course, whereby the skier passes through pairs of poles (gates) of alternating colors on this German language diagram. Ziel stands for the finish line.

A course is constructed by laying out a series of gates, formed by alternating pairs of red and blue poles. The skier must pass between the two poles forming the gate, with the tips of both skis and the skier's feet passing between the poles. A course has 55 to 75 gates for men and 40 to 60 for women. The vertical drop for a men's course is 180 to 220 m (591 to 722 ft) and measures slightly less for women. The gates are arranged in a variety of configurations to challenge the competitor.

== Clearing the gates ==
Traditionally, bamboo poles were used for gates, the rigidity of which forced skiers to maneuver their entire body around each gate. In the early 1980s, rigid poles were replaced by hard plastic poles, hinged at the base. The hinged gates require, according to FIS rules, only that the skis and boots of the skier go around each gate.

The new gates allow a more direct path down a slalom course through the process of cross-blocking or shinning the gates. Cross-blocking is a technique in which the legs go around the gate with the upper body inclined toward, or even across, the gate; in this case the racer's outside pole and shinguards hit the gate, knocking it down and out of the way. Cross-blocking is done by pushing the gate down with the arms, hands, or shins. By 1989, most of the top technical skiers in the world had adopted the cross-block technique.

If both feet and ski tips have not crossed the gate line, a fault is committed. This could be due to a straddle or other factors.

== Equipment ==
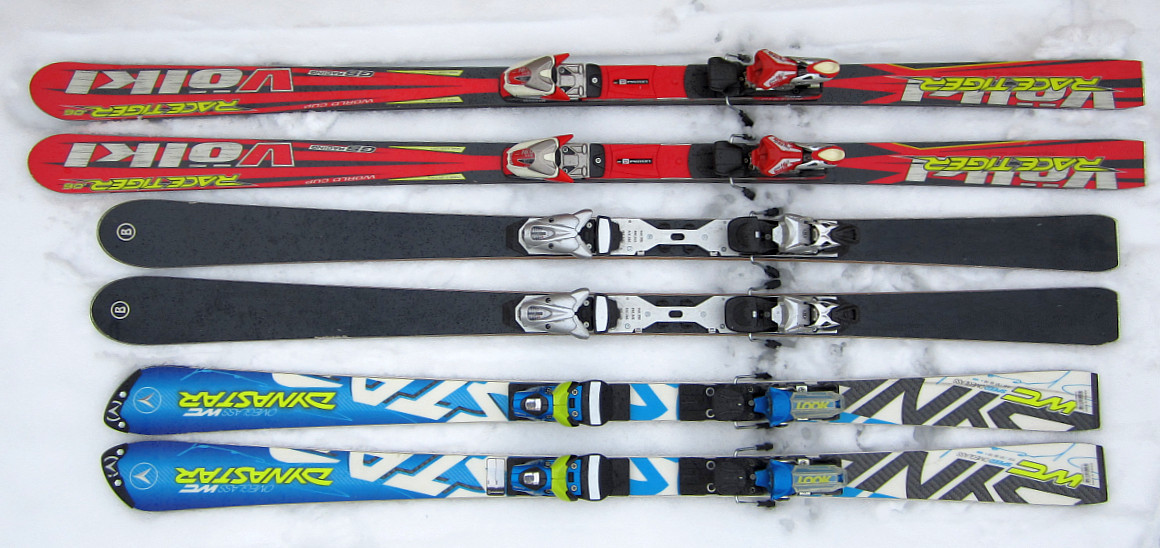
Bottom: 2013 FIS legal slalom race skis, top: giant slalom race skis from 2006

With the innovation of shaped skis around the turn of the 21st century, equipment used for slalom in international competition changed drastically. World Cup skiers commonly skied on slalom skis at a length of 203–207 centimetres (79.9–81.5 in) in the 1980s and 1990s but by the 2002 Olympic Winter Games in Salt Lake City, the majority of competitors were using skis measuring 160 cm (63.0 in) or less.

The downside of the shorter skis was that athletes found that recoveries were more difficult with a smaller platform underfoot. Out of concern for the safety of athletes, the FIS began to set minimum ski lengths for international slalom competition. The minimum was initially set at 155 cm (61.0 in) for men and 150 cm (59.1 in) for women, but was increased to 165 cm (65.0 in) for men and 157 cm (61.8 in) for women for the 2003–2004 season.

The equipment minimums and maximums imposed by the International Ski Federation (FIS) have created a backlash from skiers, suppliers, and fans. The main objection is that the federation is regressing the equipment, and hence the sport, by two decades.

American Bode Miller hastened the shift to the shorter, more radical sidecut skis when he achieved unexpected success after becoming the first Junior Olympic athlete to adopt the equipment in giant slalom and super-G in 1996. A few years later, the technology was adapted to slalom skis as well.

== Men's slalom World Cup podiums ==
In the following table men's slalom World Cup podiums in the World Cup since first season in 1967.

Season	1st	2nd	3rd
1967	(France) Jean-Claude Killy	(France) Guy Perillat	(Austria) Heinrich Messner
1968	(Switzerland) Dumeng Giovanoli	(France) Jean-Claude Killy	(France) Patrick Russel
1969	(France) Alain Penz (Austria) Alfred Matt (France) Jean-Noel Augert (France) Patrick Russel		
1970	(France) Alain Penz	(France) Jean-Noël Augert (France) Patrick Russel	
1971	(France) Jean-Noël Augert	(Italy) Gustav Thöni	(United States) Tyler Palmer
1972	(France) Jean-Noël Augert	(Poland) Andrzej Bachleda	(Italy) Roland Thöni
1973	(Italy) Gustav Thöni	(Germany) Christian Neureuther	(France) Jean-Noël Augert
1974	(Italy) Gustav Thöni	(Germany) Christian Neureuther	(Austria) Johann Kniewasser
1975	(Sweden) Ingemar Stenmark	(Italy) Gustav Thöni	(Italy) Piero Gros
1976	(Sweden) Ingemar Stenmark	(Italy) Piero Gros	(Italy) Gustav Thöni (Austria) Hans Hinterseer
1977	(Sweden) Ingemar Stenmark	(Austria) Klaus Heidegger	(Liechtenstein) Paul Frommelt
1978	(Sweden) Ingemar Stenmark	(Austria) Klaus Heidegger	(United States) Phil Mahre
1979	(Sweden) Ingemar Stenmark	(United States) Phil Mahre	(Germany) Christian Neureuther
1980	(Sweden) Ingemar Stenmark	(Socialist Federal Republic of Yugoslavia) Bojan Križaj	(Germany) Christian Neureuther
1981	(Sweden) Ingemar Stenmark	(United States) Phil Mahre	(Socialist Federal Republic of Yugoslavia) Bojan Križaj (United States) Steve Mahre
1982	(United States) Phil Mahre	(Sweden) Ingemar Stenmark	(United States) Steve Mahre
1983	(Sweden) Ingemar Stenmark	(Sweden) Stig Strand	(Liechtenstein) Andreas Wenzel
1984	(Luxembourg) Marc Girardelli	(Sweden) Ingemar Stenmark	(Austria) Franz Gruber
1985	(Luxembourg) Marc Girardelli	(Liechtenstein) Paul Frommelt	(Sweden) Ingemar Stenmark
1986	(Socialist Federal Republic of Yugoslavia) Rok Petrovič	(Socialist Federal Republic of Yugoslavia) Bojan Križaj (Sweden) Ingemar Stenmark (Liechtenstein) Paul Frommelt	
1987	(Socialist Federal Republic of Yugoslavia) Bojan Križaj	(Sweden) Ingemar Stenmark	(Germany) Armin Bittner
1988	(Italy) Alberto Tomba	(Austria) Günther Mader	(United States) Felix McGrath
1989	(Germany) Armin Bittner	(Italy) Alberto Tomba	(Luxembourg) Marc Girardelli (Norway) Ole Kristian Furuseth
1990	(Germany) Armin Bittner	(Italy) Alberto Tomba (Norway) Ole Kristian Furuseth	
1991	(Luxembourg) Marc Girardelli	(Norway) Ole Kristian Furuseth	(Austria) Rudolf Nierlich
1992	(Italy) Alberto Tomba	(Switzerland) Paul Accola	(Norway) Finn Christian Jagge
1993	(Sweden) Thomas Fogdö	(Italy) Alberto Tomba	(Austria) Thomas Stangassinger
1994	(Italy) Alberto Tomba	(Austria) Thomas Stangassinger	(Slovenia) Jure Košir
1995	(Italy) Alberto Tomba	(Austria) Michael Tritscher	(Slovenia) Jure Košir
1996	(France) Sebastien Amiez	(Italy) Alberto Tomba	(Austria) Thomas Sykora
1997	(Austria) Thomas Sykora	(Austria) Thomas Stangassinger	(Norway) Finn Christian Jagge
1998	(Austria) Thomas Sykora	(Austria) Thomas Stangassinger	(Norway) Hans Petter Buraas
1999	(Austria) Thomas Stangassinger	(Slovenia) Jure Košir	(Norway) Finn Christian Jagge
2000	(Norway) Kjetil André Aamodt	(Norway) Ole Kristian Furuseth	(Slovenia) Matjaž Vrhovnik
2001	(Austria) Benjamin Raich	(Austria) Heinz Schilchegger	(Austria) Mario Matt
2002	(Croatia) Ivica Kostelić	(United States) Bode Miller	(France) Jean-Pierre Vidal
2003	(Finland) Kalle Palander	(Croatia) Ivica Kostelić	(Austria) Rainer Schönfelder
2004	(Austria) Rainer Schönfelder	(Finland) Kalle Palander	(Austria) Benjamin Raich
2005	(Austria) Benjamin Raich	(Austria) Rainer Schönfelder	(Austria) Manfred Pranger
2006	(Italy) Giorgio Rocca	(Finland) Kalle Palander	(Austria) Benjamin Raich
2007	(Austria) Benjamin Raich	(Austria) Mario Matt	(Sweden) Jens Byggmark
2008	(Italy) Manfred Mölgg	(France) Jean-Baptiste Grange	(Austria) Reinfried Herbst
2009	(France) Jean-Baptiste Grange	(Croatia) Ivica Kostelić	(France) Julien Lizeroux
2010	(Austria) Reinfried Herbst	(France) Julien Lizeroux	(Switzerland) Silvan Zurbriggen
2011	(Croatia) Ivica Kostelić	(France) Jean-Baptiste Grange	(Sweden) André Myhrer
2012	(Sweden) André Myhrer	(Croatia) Ivica Kostelić	(Austria) Marcel Hirscher
2013	(Austria) Marcel Hirscher	(Germany) Felix Neureuther	(Croatia) Ivica Kostelić
2014	(Austria) Marcel Hirscher	(Germany) Felix Neureuther	(Norway) Henrik Kristoffersen
2015	(Austria) Marcel Hirscher	(Germany) Felix Neureuther	(Russia) Alexander Khoroshilov
2016	(Norway) Henrik Kristoffersen	(Austria) Marcel Hirscher	(Germany) Felix Neureuther
2017	(Austria) Marcel Hirscher	(Norway) Henrik Kristoffersen	(Italy) Manfred Mölgg
2018	(Austria) Marcel Hirscher	(Norway) Henrik Kristoffersen	(Sweden) André Myhrer
2019	(Austria) Marcel Hirscher	(France) Clément Noël	(Switzerland) Daniel Yule
2020	(Norway) Henrik Kristoffersen	(France) Clément Noël	(Switzerland) Daniel Yule
2021	(Austria) Marco Schwarz	(France) Clément Noël	(Switzerland) Ramon Zenhäusern
2022	(Norway) Henrik Kristoffersen	(Austria) Manuel Feller	(Norway) Atle Lie McGrath
2023	(Norway) Lucas Braathen	(Norway) Henrik Kristoffersen	(Switzerland) Ramon Zenhäusern
2024	(Austria) Manuel Feller	(Germany) Linus Straßer	(Norway) Timon Haugan

== Women's slalom World Cup podiums ==
In the following table women's slalom World Cup podiums in the World Cup since first season in 1967.

Season	1st	2nd	3rd
1967	(France) Annie Famose	(France) Marielle Goitschel	(Canada) Nancy Greene
1968	(France) Marielle Goitschel	(Austria) Gertrud Gabl (France) Florence Steurer	
1969	(Austria) Gertrud Gabl	(United States) Kiki Cutter	(Austria) Ingrid Lafforgue
1970	(France) Ingrid Lafforgue	(United States) Barbara Cochran (France) Michèle Jacot	
1971	(Canada) Betsy Clifford	(France) Britt Lafforgue	(United States) Barbara Cochran (Austria) Annemarie Moser-Pröll
1972	(France) Britt Lafforgue	(France) Françoise Macchi (France) Florence Steurer	
1973	(France) Patricia Emonet	(Germany) Rosi Mittermaier	(Austria) Monika Kaserer
1974	(Germany) Christa Zechmeister	(Germany) Rosi Mittermaier	(France) Fabienne Serrat
1975	(Switzerland) Lise-Marie Morerod	(Liechtenstein) Hanni Wenzel	(Germany) Christa Zechmeister
1976	(Germany) Rosi Mittermaier	(Switzerland) Lise-Marie Morerod	(France) Danièle Debernard
1977	(Switzerland) Lise-Marie Morerod	(France) Perrine Pelen	(Italy) Claudia Giordani
1978	(Liechtenstein) Hanni Wenzel	(France) Perrine Pelen	(France) Fabienne Serrat
1979	(Austria) Regina Sackl	(Austria) Annemarie Moser-Pröll	(Austria) Lea Sölkner
1980	(France) Perrine Pelen	(Liechtenstein) Hanni Wenzel	(Austria) Annemarie Moser-Pröll
1981	(Switzerland) Erika Hess	(United States) Christin Cooper	(Italy) Daniela Zini
1982	(Switzerland) Erika Hess	(Liechtenstein) Ursula Konzett	(United States) Christin Cooper
1983	(Switzerland) Erika Hess	(Austria) Roswitha Steiner	(Italy) Maria Rosa Quario
1984	(United States) Tamara McKinney	(Austria) Roswitha Steiner	(France) Perrine Pelen
1985	(Switzerland) Erika Hess	(United States) Tamara McKinney	(France) Perrine Pelen
1986	(Austria) Roswitha Steiner	(Switzerland) Erika Hess	(France) Perrine Pelen
1987	(Switzerland) Corinne Schmidhauser	(United States) Tamara McKinney	(Switzerland) Erika Hess
1988	(Austria) Roswitha Steiner	(Switzerland) Vreni Schneider	(Austria) Anita Wachter
1989	(Switzerland) Vreni Schneider	(Austria) Monika Maierhofer	(United States) Tamara McKinney
1990	(Switzerland) Vreni Schneider	(Austria) Claudia Strobl	(Austria) Ida Ladstätter
1991	(Austria) Petra Kronberger	(Sweden) Pernilla Wiberg	(Spain) Blanca Fernández Ochoa
1992	(Switzerland) Vreni Schneider	(Sweden) Pernilla Wiberg	(Spain) Blanca Fernández Ochoa
1993	(Switzerland) Vreni Schneider	(New Zealand) Annelise Coberger	(France) Patricia Chauvet
1994	(Switzerland) Vreni Schneider	(Sweden) Pernilla Wiberg	(Slovenia) Urska Hrovat
1995	(Switzerland) Vreni Schneider	(Sweden) Pernilla Wiberg	(Germany) Martina Ertl
1996	(Austria) Elfi Eder	(Slovenia) Urska Hrovat	(Sweden) Pernilla Wiberg
1997	(Sweden) Pernilla Wiberg	(New Zealand) Claudia Riegler	(Italy) Deborah Compagnoni
1998	(Sweden) Ylva Nowén	(United States) Kristina Koznick	(Germany) Hilde Gerg
1999	(Austria) Sabine Egger	(Sweden) Pernilla Wiberg	(Sweden) Anja Pärson
2000	(Slovenia) Špela Pretnar	(France) Christel Pascal	(Sweden) Anja Pärson
2001	(Croatia) Janica Kostelić	(Switzerland) Sonja Nef	(Germany) Martina Ertl
2002	(France) Laure Pequegnot	(United States) Kristina Koznick	(Sweden) Anja Pärson
2003	(Croatia) Janica Kostelić	(Sweden) Anja Pärson	(Finland) Tanja Poutiainen
2004	(Sweden) Anja Pärson	(Austria) Marlies Schild	(Germany) Monika Bergmann-Schmuderer
2005	(Finland) Tanja Poutiainen	(Croatia) Janica Kostelić	(Austria) Marlies Schild
2006	(Croatia) Janica Kostelić	(Austria) Marlies Schild	(Sweden) Anja Pärson
2007	(Austria) Marlies Schild	(Austria) Nicole Hosp	(Czech Republic) Veronika Zuzulová
2008	(Austria) Marlies Schild	(Austria) Nicole Hosp	(Czech Republic) Veronika Zuzulová
2009	(Germany) Maria Riesch	(Czech Republic) Šárka Záhrobská	(United States) Lindsey Vonn
2010	(Germany) Maria Riesch	(Austria) Kathrin Zettel	(Austria) Marlies Schild
2011	(Austria) Marlies Schild	(Finland) Tanja Poutiainen	(Germany) Maria Riesch
2012	(Austria) Marlies Schild	(Austria) Michaela Kirchgasser	(Slovenia) Tina Maze
2013	(United States) Mikaela Shiffrin	(Slovenia) Tina Maze	(Slovakia) Veronika Velez-Zuzulová
2014	(United States) Mikaela Shiffrin	(Sweden) Frida Hansdotter	(Austria) Marlies Schild
2015	(United States) Mikaela Shiffrin	(Sweden) Frida Hansdotter	(Slovenia) Tina Maze
2016	(Sweden) Frida Hansdotter	(Slovakia) Veronika Velez-Zuzulová	(Switzerland) Wendy Holdener
2017	(United States) Mikaela Shiffrin	(Slovakia) Veronika Velez-Zuzulová	(Switzerland) Wendy Holdener
2018	(United States) Mikaela Shiffrin	(Switzerland) Wendy Holdener	(Sweden) Frida Hansdotter
2019	(United States) Mikaela Shiffrin	(Slovakia) Petra Vlhová	(Switzerland) Wendy Holdener
2020	(Slovakia) Petra Vlhová	(United States) Mikaela Shiffrin	(Austria) Katharina Liensberger
2021	(Austria) Katharina Liensberger	(United States) Mikaela Shiffrin	(Slovakia) Petra Vlhová
2022	(Slovakia) Petra Vlhová	(United States) Mikaela Shiffrin	(Germany) Lena Dürr
2023	(United States) Mikaela Shiffrin	(Switzerland) Wendy Holdener	(Slovakia) Petra Vlhová
2024	(United States) Mikaela Shiffrin	(Germany) Lena Dürr	(Slovakia) Petra Vlhová
