= Crystal Mountain (Washington) =

Ski area in Washington, United States

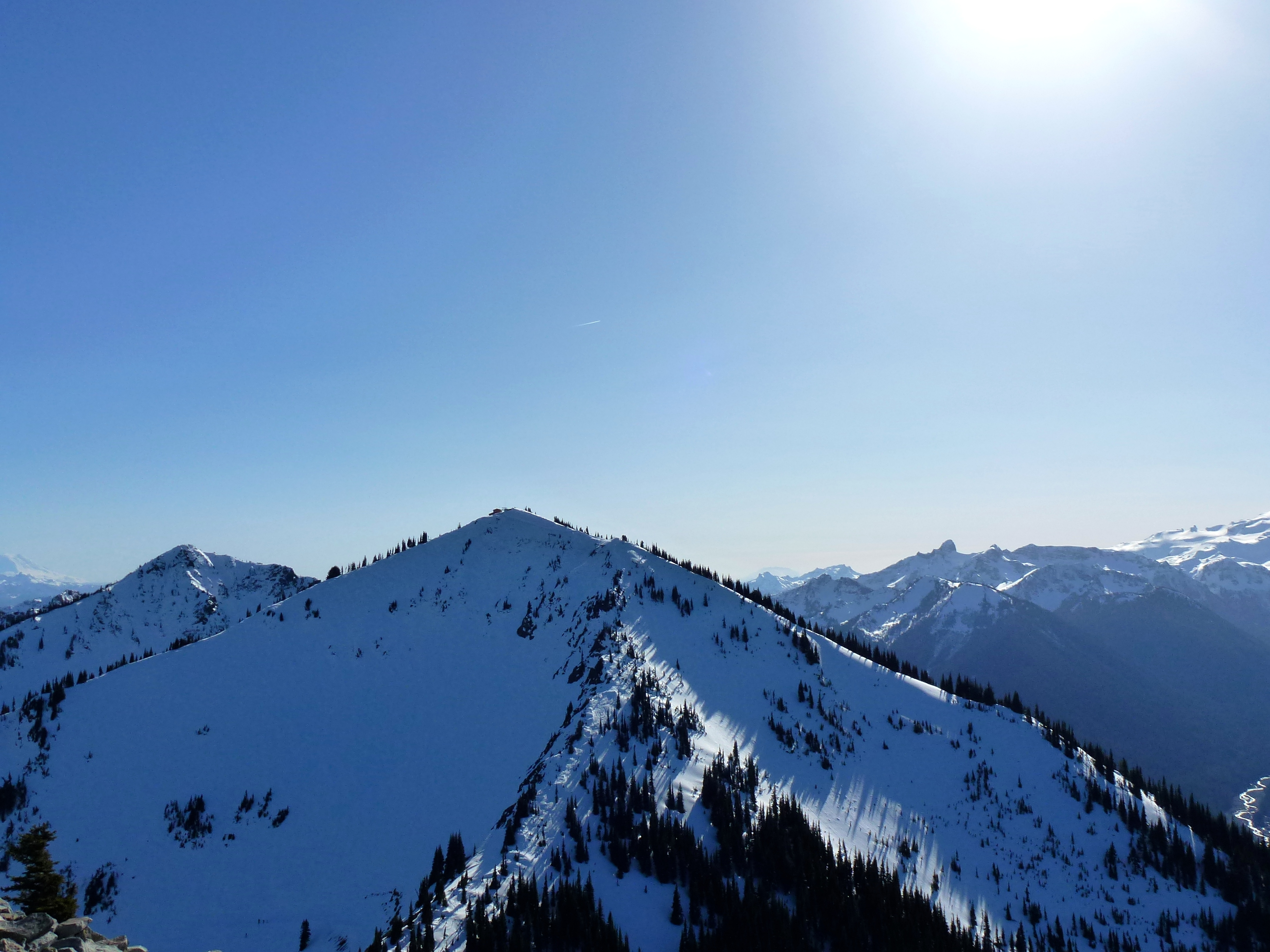
- Crystal in March 2015

- Location in Washington Location in the United States
- Location: Mount Baker-Snoqualmie National Forest; Pierce County, Washington, U.S.
- Nearest city: Enumclaw; 40 mi. (65 km) north
- Coordinates: 46.93°N 121.48°W
- Status: Operating
- Opened: December 1962; 63 years ago
- Owner: Alterra Mountain Company
- Vertical: 3,100 ft (945 m); 2,592 ft (790 m) - lifts
- Top elevation: 7,012 ft (2,137 m); 6,992 ft (2,131 m) - lifts
- Base elevation: 3,912 ft (1,192 m); 4,400 ft (1,341 m) - lifts
- Skiable area: 2,600 acres (10.5 km^{2}) lift serviced: 2,300 acres (9.3 km^{2}) inbounds backcountry: 300 acres (1.2 km^{2})
- Trails: 80 (57 designated trails): 11% easiest; 54% more difficult; 35% most difficult
- Longest run: 2.5 mi (4 km) "Northway"
- Lift system: 1 gondola 9 chairs 1 magic carpet
- Lift capacity: 19,888 / hr
- Terrain parks: Yes, 2
- Snowfall: 350 in (29.2 ft; 8.9 m)
- Snowmaking: Yes (added in 2015)
- Night skiing: Limited, until 6 p.m. or 8 p.m.
- Website: crystalmountainresort.com

Crystal Mountain is a mountain and alpine ski area in eastern Pierce County, Washington, United States, located in the Cascade Range southeast of Seattle. It is the largest ski resort in the state of Washington and lies within the Mount Baker–Snoqualmie National Forest. The resort is accessible from the Seattle–Tacoma metropolitan area via State Route 410.

Primarily a day-use area, Crystal has nine chairlifts, various dining locations, and multiple hotels. It is also home to the Mt. Rainier Gondola, which provides year-round access to the resort's summit and is the state's only high-speed gondola. The gondola was installed in 2010.

Crystal Mountain was acquired by the Alterra Mountain Company in 2018.

== Location ==
Crystal Mountain is accessible from Enumclaw, by driving to the Sunrise entrance of Mount Rainier National Park, past the small town of Greenwater.

The ski resort is located in the valley of the Silver Creek, a tributary of the White River, and on the east and north east slopes of Crystal Mountain. The main summit of Crystal, also called Silver King, is 7,002 ft (2,134 m) (NAVD88 elevation) and is the highest land in a 5-mile (8 km) radius. Subsidiary peaks on the north ridge of Silver King are The Throne (6,861 ft (2,091 m)), Silver Queen (ca. 6,990 ft (2,130 m)), Grubstake Point (ca. 6,875 ft (2,095 m)) and North Way Peak (6,780 ft (2,065 m)). The latter three can be reached by ski lifts, and the resort has a Summit House on a shoulder just south of Grubstake. The summits offer an unobstructed view of Mount Rainier, which is less than 13 miles (20 km) west-south-west.

== History ==
=== 1960s ===
Crystal Mountain Resort opened in December 1962 with two double chairlifts. The first of these lifts, Miner's Basin, was decommissioned in the summer of 2011. Its route was close to that of the Gondola and ended by the top of the Exterminator and Deerfly runs. The other original lift (Iceberg Ridge) was removed when the Rainier Express was built. The site, just northeast of Mount Rainier National Park, was chosen after some Tacoma skiers were unable to start a resort within the boundaries of the park. The Green Valley double chairlift was built the following summer, and the Quicksilver lift followed in 1964.

In 1965, Crystal hosted the collegiate ski championships in late March and the following week the U.S. Alpine Ski Championships, which included famous racers such as Karl Schranz of Austria, Olympic medalists Jimmie Heuga and Billy Kidd of the U.S., future triple gold medalist Jean-Claude Killy of France, and future gold medalist Nancy Greene of Canada.

Crystal hosted the national championships again in 1968, a few weeks after the Winter Olympics. Kidd, Heuga, and Greene were again in the field, as well as Spider Sabich. Back from the Olympics and the World Cup tour, local Judy Nagel won the women's slalom and combined titles at age sixteen. Five years earlier, her father Jack Nagel (1926–2004) and the racing school at Crystal were featured in Sports Illustrated, with her older sister Cathy, then fourteen, on the cover.

=== 1970s ===
The Campbell Basin chairlift opened in 1970, which opened Campbell Basin to skiing for the first time and traveled from the base area all the way to the site of the current Campbell Basin Lodge.

Two weeks after the 1972 Olympics, Crystal hosted the World Cup tour in late February 1972 with two downhills for both men and women, with the start above Campbell Basin. Weather forced a low start; the winning men's times were under 90 seconds. Newly-crowned Olympic downhill champion Bernhard Russi of Switzerland won the Saturday race and took second on Sunday. American Mike Lafferty of Eugene, Oregon, took second and fourth in the two downhills. A women's slalom scheduled for Sunday was cancelled due to weather.

In 1974, Crystal added its first triple chairlift, Bullion Basin. High Campbell, the highest lift at Crystal, was added in 1976. It was pre-owned, purchased from the defunct Yodelin Ski Area near Stevens Pass. High Campbell serves the summit of Silver Queen and provides access to The Throne, Silver King, Campbell Basin, Avalanche Basin, and Silver Basin.

=== 1980s ===
In 1984, Bullion Basin was moved to its current location as the Gold Hills lift. That same year, the Rendezvous and Discovery triple chairlifts were installed.

Washington's first high-speed detachable quad chairlift, the Rainier Express was installed in the summer of 1988, replacing the original chair 2. A fixed grip quad, Midway Shuttle, was added to connect the base area with Rainier Express. The Campbell Basin double was shortened because the lower half was no longer necessary. These upgrades were funded with money from investors, who in return would get future discounts on lift tickets and season passes. Today this group of investors is the Crystal Mountain Founder's Club.

=== 1990s ===
In the mid-1990s, Crystal Mountain became deeply in debt and was unable to pay for further important improvements such as new lifts and lodges. The original investors sold the area to Boyne Resorts in March 1997. The deal directed Boyne to spend at least $15 million in capital improvements during the first ten years. In the first two years, Doppelmayr constructed two high speed six passenger chairlifts, the Chinook and Forest Queen Express lifts to replace Midway Shuttle and Rendezvous, respectively (Midway Shuttle being relocated to Loup Loup Ski Bowl). Boyne also made other improvements such as a new rental facility, paved parking lots, and five new Bombardier snowcat grooming machines.

=== 2000s ===
The Green Valley double chairlift was replaced with a high-speed quad in the summer of 2000, constructed by Doppelmayr. In the summer of 2007, Crystal underwent a major expansion, building the Northway chairlift in the former North Backcountry. This increased developed terrain by 70% to 2,300 acres (9.3 km^{2}). In addition, the Summit House restaurant was remodeled.

=== 2010s ===
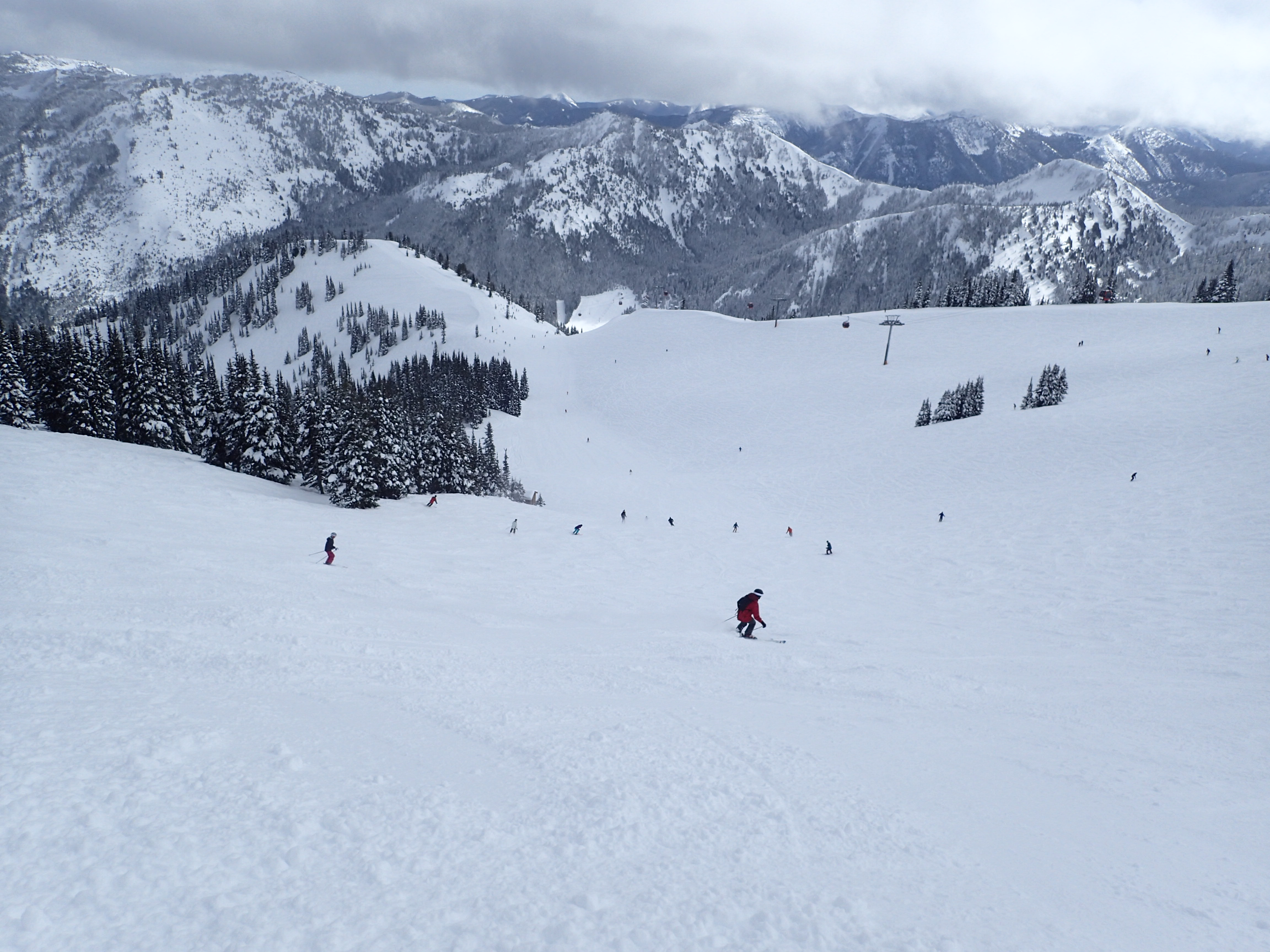
Crystal Mountain Near Summit House

During the summer of 2010, a terrain park was constructed and the Mt. Rainier Gondola was installed by Doppelmayr, which travels directly from the base area to the summit house, and its first day of operation was New Year's Day 2011. During an extremely severe avalanche period on March 10, 2014, the ski patrol triggered an avalanche as part of normal control work, which destroyed the High Campbell chairlift. During the summer of 2014 work to replace the High Campbell and Quicksilver chairs was initiated. A Skytrac double chairlift was built quickly to replace High Campbell, renamed Chair 6,. The Quicksilver chair was replaced with a fixed grip quad that had originally operated at Deer Valley Resort as Deer Crest. The top station was lowered 250 feet (75 m) to cut off the steep top part of the Quicksilver Run, now rated a green, over a blue. The ribbon-cutting ceremony for both chairs was held on January 8, 2015, at 9AM for Quicksilver and 10AM for Chair 6.

Crystal Mountain was acquired by John Kircher on March 31, 2017. This lasted one full season until Alterra Mountain Company agreed to purchase Crystal Mountain on September 6, 2018.

=== 2020s ===
In March 2022, Crystal Mountain Resort and Alterra Mountain Company announced a $100 million redevelopment program that would include a new food and retail building, a 100-room hotel, and additional parking lots. The announcement also brought a $700 increase in season pass costs for the 2022–23 season in addition to increased parking costs.

== World Cup alpine racers ==
- Susan Corrock (b.1951)
- Alan Lauba (b.1961)
- Libby Ludlow (b.1981)
- Scott Macartney (b.1978)
- Paul McDonald (b.1984)
- Cathy Nagel (b.1949)
- Judy Nagel (b.1951)
- Tatum Skoglund (b.1978)

== Master Development Plan ==
Following the acquisition by Boyne Resorts, Crystal Mountain submitted a Master Development Plan (MDP) to the U.S. Forest Service (USFS), which included six alternatives for redevelopment of the mountain. A draft environmental impact study was issued in 2001 and finalized in August 2004. John Phipps, Mt. Baker-Snoqualmie National Forest Supervisor, selected Alternative Six with modifications from the Final Environmental Impact Statement. It approves new facilities including an aerial tram to the summit, a new chairlift in Northback, a surface lift, existing chairlift upgrades, base facility renovations, employee housing and wastewater facilities. The plan is the largest in Washington's history, costing Boyne an estimated $40 million.

=== Completed projects ===
- Northway (C-12) provided direct lift access to the area north of the original ski area. Previously, this area was known as North Backcountry and required a long traverse or shuttle ride back to the base area. The new lift is a fixed-grip double chairlift from Doppelmayr CTEC, installed in the summer of 2007 with a top terminal on Northway Peak.
- Mt. Rainier Gondola provides direct access from the base area plaza to the summit, allowing for year-round access. Sightseers, skiers, hikers, and diners can all ride the gondola. This Doppelmayr CTEC 8-passenger lift was completed in 2010 and opened on January 1, 2011.
- High Campbell "Chair 6" Replacement (C-2) provided direct lift access to the area around Silver Queen and the Southback area. Previously, this area was served by a fixed-grip double known as High Campbell. The old chair was destroyed by an avalanche in March 2014 and was inoperable. The new lift is a fixed-grip double chairlift from Skytrac, installed in the summer of 2014 with a top terminal on Silver Queen at 7002', still providing access to Powder Bowl, Southback and Campbell Basin. The new chair can withstand higher winds than the original.
- Quicksilver Replacement (C-4) provides access to the green circle Quicksilver and black diamond Boondoggle runs and is accessed by the Discovery triple. Previously, this chair was served by a fixed-grip double installed and left untouched since 1964. Crystal Mountain wanted to make the terrain more beginner-friendly and lowered the top station by 250 feet to avoid the steep slope at the top. The Quicksilver run was previously a blue square but was changed to a green circle. The base station is equipped with a loading carpet to ease the loading process. The new lift is a fixed-grip quad chairlift from Garaventa CTEC, which originally had operated at Deer Valley Resort in Utah as the Deer Crest lift before being replaced with a high speed quad in 2012. Quicksilver was built with a top terminal altitude of around 5200'. The new chair has double the uphill capacity, and the Quicksilver trail was regraded over the summer to make it more beginner-friendly.

=== Proposed and approved ===
- Kelly's Gap Express (C-13) will rise westwards from the new Bullion Base and terminating above and to the north of Green Valley Express.
- Bullion Basin (C15) would rise eastwards on the other side of valley from the Bullion Base to an area that previously had a lift abandoned in 1983 (the footprint of a lift and trails can be viewed from the top of Rainier Express). This lift will also allow access to East Peak backcountry area for expert skiers. Rumors suggest that although this lift was included in the Record of Decision, the lift may not actually be built.
- Park N' Ride (C12) will provide access between the new Bullion Base and the current base area.
- Two new surface tows at the old base area (Ptarmigan, S1) and new Bullion Base (Pika, S2)
- High speed replacements for the Quicksilver and Discovery chairs with no additional trail development.

=== Rejected by Forest Service ===
- Silver King lift, this lift would have started on Queen's Run and serviced the summit of Silver King.
