= Tax straddle =

A tax straddle is a strategy used to create a tax shelter.

For example, an investor with a capital gain manipulates investments to create an artificial loss from an unrelated transaction to offset their gain in a current year, and postpone the gain till the following tax year. One position accumulates an unrealized gain, the other a loss. Then the position with the loss is closed prior to the completion of the tax year, countering the gain. When the new year for tax begins, a replacement position is created to offset the risk from the retained position. Through repeated straddling, gains can be postponed indefinitely over many years.
