= Straddle (skiing) =

Rule violation in skiing

To straddle or straddling a gate in skiing means a certain fault where the inside ski passes the wrong side of the gate pole and as a result the pole slides between inside and outside ski. Gate faults like that are especially common in alpine ski racing, but can also occur in other sports like ski cross or snowboarding.

== Rules ==
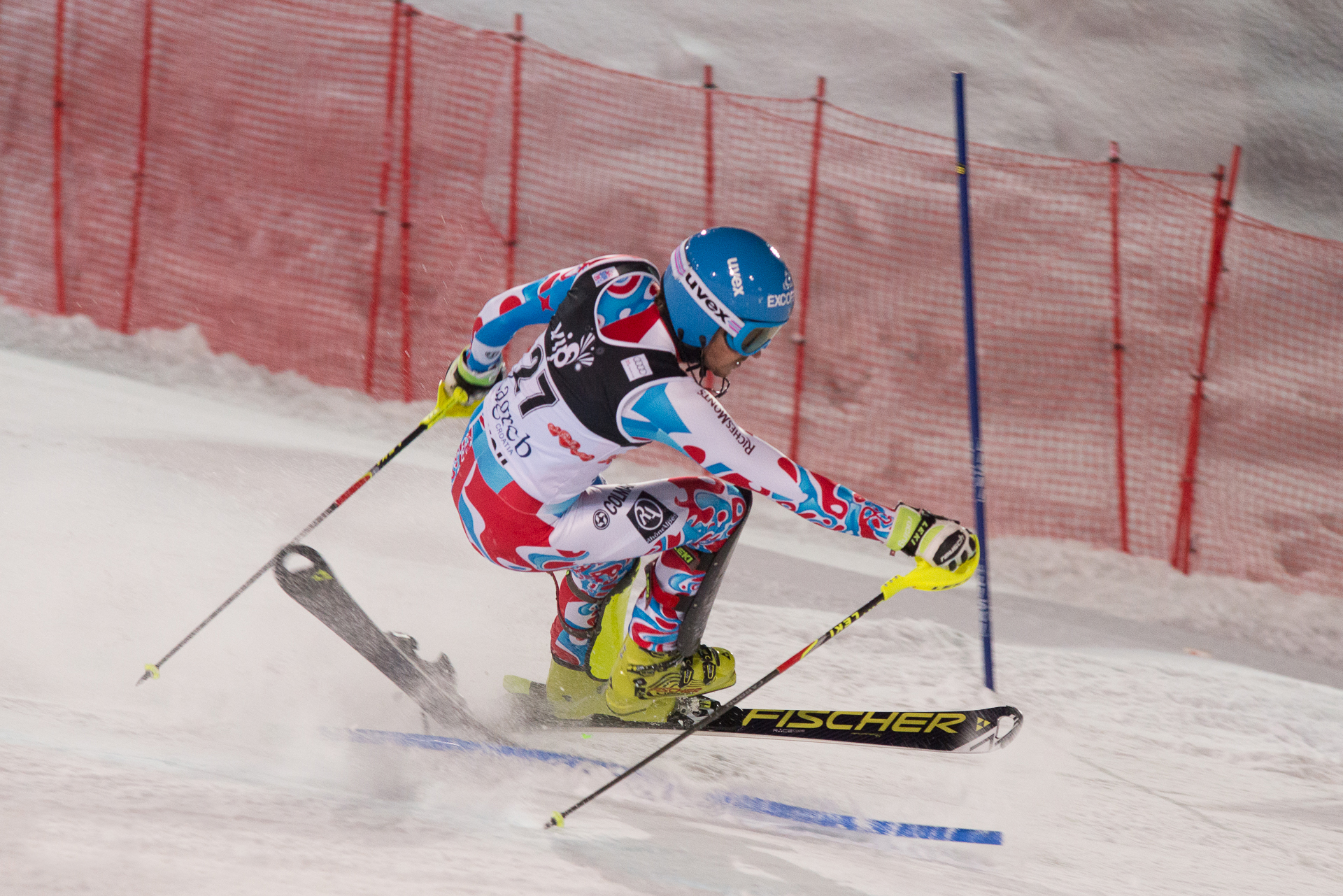
Steve Missillier right after straddling a slalom gate (Zagreb 2015)

According to rule 661.4 of the International Ski Federation's international ski competition rules (ICR) a gate is passed correctly if both ski tips and both feet cross an imaginary line between two gate poles. This is not the case for a straddle which means a gate fault is committed. Most frequently straddles happen in slalom skiing where the athletes are able to run the narrowest line due to the flex-pole technique. In some cases straddles lead to falls, especially when the pressure induced by the pole loosens the binding of the inside ski. Continuing the race after a straddle (ICR rule 628.8) – no matter whether it happens unnoticed or not – demands a disqualification and eventually a fine of 999 Swiss francs.

== Famous examples ==
In January 2012 several supposed straddles by Marcel Hirscher in the FIS Alpine Ski World Cup caused a controversy. After actually straddling a gate in the Wengen and Kitzbühel slaloms without noticing, rumours spread that he might have also straddled the first gates during his victory runs in Zagreb and Adelboden. His rival and contender for the overall world cup Ivica Kostelić was infuriated by that. After hours of video analysis, Hirscher and his mate Felix Neureuther who also was accused of straddling in the Zagreb race could be acquitted from the allegations. What was dubbed Einfädler-Affäre ('straddling affair') by Austrian media was settled by a public handshake between Hirscher/Neureuther and Kostelić before the slalom night race in Schladming. From that on Hirscher used special fixtures for his ski tips (in German Geierschnäbel) designed to reduce the straddling risk while skiing through the gates the narrowest line possible.

Possibly race-deciding straddles during important races occurred to Bode Miller and Benjamin Raich whilst competing for the Olympic gold medal at the alpine combined in Torino 2006 or Marcel Hirscher in the world championship slalom in Beaver Creek 2015. Stefan Luitz straddled the final gate of the first run during the Olympic giant slalom in Sochi 2014 just before crossing the finish line and setting the second best intermediate time. AJ Ginnis was disqualified 23 whole minutes after achieving first ever Greek victory in World Cup in Palisades Tahoe 2023's slalom; the straddle couldn't be verified by the organisers' cameras, due to heavy snowfall.
