= Mike Lafferty (alpine skier) =

American alpine skier

Personal information
- Born: May 20, 1948 (age 78) Eugene, Oregon, U.S.
- Height: 6 ft 0 in (1.83 m)

Skiing career
- Sport: Alpine skiing
- Club: Bend Skyliners; University of Colorado
- Retired: March 1974 (age 25)
- Disciplines: Downhill
- World Cup debut: January 1969 (age 20)

Olympics
- Teams: 1 – (1972)
- Medals: 0

World Championships
- Teams: 2 – (1970, 1972) includes Olympics
- Medals: 0

World Cup
- Seasons: 6 – (1969–74)
- Wins: 0
- Podiums: 2 – (2 DH)
- Overall titles: 0 – (9th in 1972)
- Discipline titles: 0 – (3rd in DH, 1972)

Michael McCormack Lafferty (born May 20, 1948) is a former World Cup alpine ski racer from the United States. He specialized in downhill and had two World Cup podiums and eleven top ten finishes, all in downhill. His best finish in the World Cup season standings was in 1972: third in downhill and ninth overall.

== Early years ==
Born in Eugene, Oregon, Lafferty was the third and youngest son of Paul and Jean Lafferty. His father Paul (1910–92) was a college ski team coach in the 1930s and an officer in the famed 10th Mountain Division of the U.S. Army in World War II.

Lafferty learned to ski at Willamette Pass and raced as a junior for the Bend Skyliners at Mt. Bachelor. Following graduation from South Eugene High School in 1966, he followed his brother Peter to the University of Colorado in Boulder, as a member of Beta Theta Pi. He raced for the Buffaloes for two years until named to the "B team" of the U.S. Ski Team in December 1968, then promoted to the "A team" later that month.

== Racing career ==
Lafferty's first top ten result in a World Cup race was in December 1969, with a fifth place in a downhill at Val-d'Isère, France. At the Winter Olympics in 1972 in Japan, Lafferty finished 14th in the downhill. Two years earlier, he was 31st at the World Championships in 1970 in Italy.

Lafferty's best World Cup result was his first podium, a runner-up finish at Crystal Mountain, Washington, in February 1972, the first event after the Olympics. The next day he had a fourth-place finish in another downhill and ascended another podium in Italy a few weeks later. Before the Olympics, he finished just off the podium in mid-January with a fourth place at storied Kitzbühel.

His third-place finish in the World Cup downhill season standings in 1972 was the best by an American male until 2003, when Daron Rahlves finished second. (Other third-place finishers were Bill Johnson in 1984 and A.J. Kitt in 1992.) Rahlves finished second again in 2004 and Bode Miller was also second in 2005 and 2008. Through 2014, a U.S. male has yet to win the season title in the downhill discipline.

== After racing ==
Following his final season in 1974, Lafferty returned to Oregon to help manage the family's successful cold storage business in Eugene and Albany. He briefly raced on the pro circuit in North America.

== World Cup results ==
=== Season standings ===
Season	Age	Overall	Slalom	Giant Slalom	Super G	Downhill	Combined
1969	20	(57)	—	—	not run	—	not run
1970	21	41	—	—	not run	12	not run
1971	22	50	—	—	not run	23	not run
1972	23	9	—	—	not run	3	not run
1973	24	41	—	—	not run	17	not run
1974	25	(63)	—	—	not run	—	not run

Points were only awarded for top ten finishes (see scoring system).

=== Top ten finishes ===
- 2 podiums - (2 DH)
- 11 top tens - (11 DH)

Season	Date	Location	Discipline	Place
1970	14 Dec 1969	Val-d'Isère, France	Downhill	5th
1971	29 Jan 1971	Megève, France	Downhill	9th
1972	12 Dec 1971	Val-d'Isère, France	Downhill	6th
1972	14 Jan 1972	Kitzbühel, Austria	Downhill	4th
1972	25 Feb 1972	(United States) Crystal Mountain, USA	Downhill	2nd
1972	26 Feb 1972	(United States) Crystal Mountain, USA	Downhill	4th
1972	15 Mar 1972	Val Gardena, Italy	Downhill	3rd
1973	15 Dec 1972	Val Gardena, Italy	Downhill	9th
1973	6 Jan 1973	Garmisch, West Germany	Downhill	9th
1973	7 Jan 1973	Garmisch, West Germany	Downhill	9th
1973	27 Jan 1973	Kitzbühel, Austria	Downhill	8th
