= Bernard Grosfilley =

French alpine skier (1949–2020)

Personal information
- Born: 3 August 1949 Saint-Claude, France
- Died: 16 January 2020 (aged 70) Annecy, France

Skiing career
- Country: France
- Sport: Alpine skiing
- Disciplines: Downhill
- World Cup debut: 1970

World Cup
- Seasons: 2 – (1970–1971)
- Overall titles: 0 – (34th in 1970)

Bernard Grosfilley (3 August 1949 – 16 January 2020) was a French alpine skier. He competed at the 1970 and 1971 FIS Alpine Ski World Cup.

Grossfilley died in Annecy on 16 January 2020, at the age of 79.
