= Roger Rossat-Mignod =

French alpine skier (born 1946)

Roger Rossat-Mignod (born 23 September 1946 in Flumet) is a French retired alpine skier who competed in the 1972 Winter Olympics.
