= Andrzej Bachleda (born 1947) =

Polish alpine skier (born 1947)

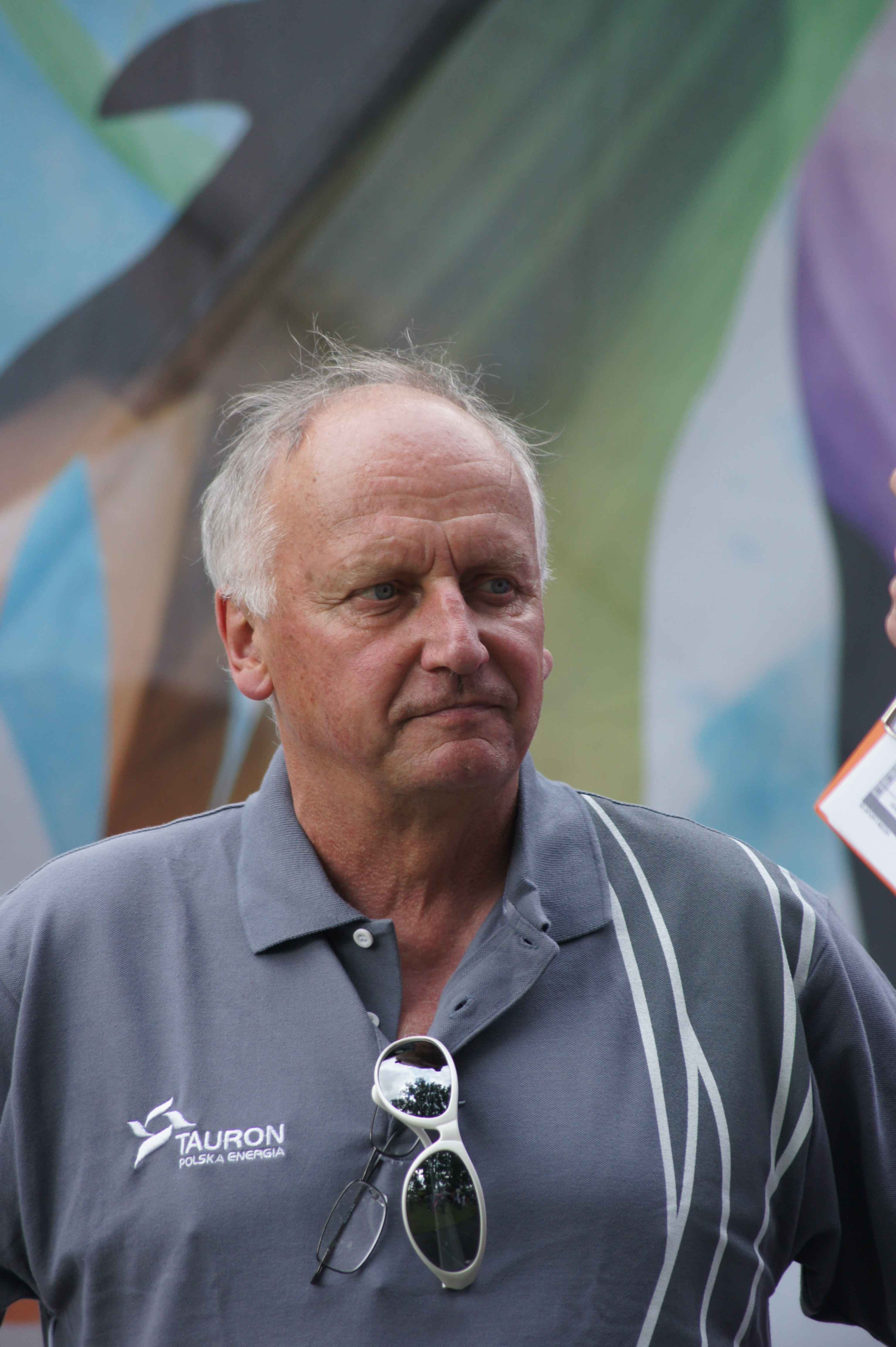
- Andrzej Bachleda-Curuś

Medal record

Men's Alpine Skiing

Representing Poland

World Championships
Silver medal – second place	1974 St. Moritz	Combined
Bronze medal – third place	1970 Val Gardena	Combined

Andrzej Jan Bachleda-Curuś (born 21 January 1947 in Zakopane) is a Polish former alpine skier who competed in the 1968 Winter Olympics and 1972 Winter Olympics. In 1968 he finished 6th in slalom race.

Olympic Games
Preceded by Stanisław Szczepaniak	Flagbearer for Poland; Sapporo 1972	Succeeded by Wojciech Truchan
