= 1970 Alpine Skiing World Cup – Women's giant slalom =

1970 Women's giant slalom World Cup
Previous: 1969	Next: 1971

Women's giant slalom World Cup 1969/1970

== Final point standings ==
In women's giant slalom World Cup 1969/70 the best 3 results count. Deductions are given in ().

Place	Name	Country	Total points	Deduction	1 (France)	3 (Austria)	6 (Germany)	11 (Socialist Federal Republic of Yugoslavia)	14 (France)	16 (Italy)	20 (Italy)	23 (Canada)	25 (Norway)
1	Françoise Macchi	France	70	(26)	25	(11)	20	-	25	-	(15)	-	-
	Michèle Jacot	France	70	(26)	(15)	20	25	-	-	-	(11)	25	-
3	Annemarie Pröll	Austria	60	(22)	(11)	(3)	(8)	25	20	-	-	-	15
4	Judy Nagel	United States	55	(15)	-	25	-	-	15	15	-	(15)	-
	Barbara Ann Cochran	United States	55	(42)	20	15	(15)	(15)	(8)	-	(2)	20	(2)
6	Ingrid Lafforgue	France	53	(24)	-	8	-	(8)	(6)	(2)	20	(8)	25
7	Betsy Clifford	Canada	41	(2)	8	-	(1)	-	-	8	25	(1)	-
8	Florence Steurer	France	37	(12)	-	-	(3)	20	11	6	(3)	(6)	-
9	Britt Lafforgue	France	32	(3)	-	-	(1)	-	3	25	-	(2)	4
10	Karen Budge	United States	28	(10)	(2)	-	11	(2)	(2)	11	-	(4)	6
11	Rosi Mittermaier	West Germany	25	(8)	6	-	-	(4)	-	-	(4)	11	8
12	Marilyn Cochran	United States	23	(11)	(4)	6	-	(4)	-	(3)	6	-	11
13	Marie France Jean-Georges	France	22		-	2	-	-	-	20	-	-	-
14	Gertrude Gabl	Austria	20	(4)	(3)	(1)	6	6	-	-	8	-	-
	Wiltrud Drexel	Austria	20		-	-	-	-	-	-	-	-	20
16	Bernadette Rauter	Austria	12		1	-	-	11	-	-	-	-	-
17	Dominique Mathieux	France	8		-	-	-	-	4	4	-	-	-
18	Julie Wolcott	United States	7	(1)	-	4	-	2	1	(1)	-	-	-
19	Annerösli Zryd	Switzerland	4		-	-	4	-	-	-	-	-	-
	Divina Galica	United Kingdom	4		-	-	-	-	-	-	1	3	-
21	Diane Culver	Canada	3		-	-	-	-	-	-	-	-	3
22	Edith Sprecher	Switzerland	2		-	-	2	-	-	-	-	-	-
23	Julie Spettel	Austria	1		-	-	-	-	-	-	-	-	1

Alpine skiing World Cup
Women

Overall | Downhill | Giant slalom | Slalom

1970
