= 1970 Alpine Skiing World Cup – Women's slalom =

1970 Women's slalom World Cup
Previous: 1969	Next: 1971

Women's slalom World Cup 1969/1970

== Final point standings ==
In women's slalom World Cup 1969/70 the best 3 results count. Deductions are given in ().

Place	Name	Country	Total points	Deduction	2 (France)	4 (Austria)	5 (Germany)	7 (Switzerland)	9 (Austria)	12 (Socialist Federal Republic of Yugoslavia)	13 (France)	17 (Italy)	19 (Italy)	22 (United States)	24 (Canada)	26 (Norway)
1	Ingrid Lafforgue	France	75	(96)	(6)	(20)	-	-	25	-	(20)	25	25	(25)	(25)	-
2	Barbara Ann Cochran	United States	65	(20)	20	-	-	-	-	25	-	-	20	(20)	-	-
	Michèle Jacot	France	65	(11)	25	(11)	-	25	-	-	-	-	15	-	-	-
4	Bernadette Rauter	Austria	55	(16)	-	15	25	-	-	15	(3)	(11)	(2)	-	-	-
	Betsy Clifford	Canada	55	(32)	-	-	(8)	20	20	-	-	(6)	(3)	15	(15)	-
	Britt Lafforgue	France	55	(25)	(3)	(4)	-	(1)	-	20	(6)	-	-	(11)	20	15
7	Judy Nagel	United States	53	(18)	-	25	-	-	-	-	-	20	8	(6)	(6)	(6)
8	Florence Steurer	France	50	(24)	15	(4)	-	(8)	-	-	15	-	(4)	(8)	-	20
9	Rosi Mittermaier	West Germany	42	(10)	(4)	-	-	-	6	(2)	-	-	-	(4)	11	25
10	Kiki Cutter	United States	40	(3)	-	-	-	(3)	-	11	25	4	-	-	-	-
11	Marilyn Cochran	United States	34	(6)	-	8	-	15	11	-	-	-	(6)	-	-	-
	Dominique Mathieux	France	34		-	-	-	-	15	4	-	15	-	-	-	-
13	Annie Famose	France	33	(13)	11	(6)	-	11	-	-	11	-	-	(3)	(4)	-
14	Françoise Macchi	France	31		-	-	15	-	8	-	8	-	-	-	-	-
15	Annemarie Pröll	Austria	27		-	-	-	-	-	8	-	8	-	-	-	11
16	Isabelle Mir	France	25		-	1	20	-	-	-	4	-	-	-	-	-
	Gertrude Gabl	Austria	25		8	-	-	6	-	-	-	-	11	-	-	-
18	Karen Budge	United States	23	(4)	(2)	-	11	4	-	-	(2)	-	-	-	8	-
19	Rosi Fortna	United States	13		-	-	6	-	4	-	-	3	-	-	-	-
20	Karianne Christiansen	Norway	12		1	-	-	-	-	3	-	-	-	-	-	8
21	Gina Hathorn	United Kingdom	10	(3)	-	-	-	2	2	6	(1)	-	(1)	-	(1)	-
22	Patty Boydstun	United States	6		-	-	4	-	-	-	-	2	-	-	-	-
	Susie Corrock	United States	6		-	-	-	-	3	-	-	-	-	-	3	-
	Toril Førland	Norway	4		-	-	-	-	-	-	-	-	-	-	-	4
	Judy Crawford	Canada	4		-	-	-	-	-	-	-	-	-	1	-	3
26	Margret Hafen	West Germany	3		-	-	3	-	-	-	-	-	-	-	-	-
	Julie Wolcott	United States	3		-	-	-	-	-	-	-	1	-	-	2	-
	Diane Culver	Canada	3		-	-	-	-	-	-	-	-	-	-	-	3
29	Traudl Treichl	West Germany	2		-	2	-	-	-	-	-	-	-	-	-	-
	Christine Rolland	France	2		-	-	2	-	-	-	-	-	-	-	-	-
	Divina Galica	United Kingdom	2		-	-	-	-	-	-	-	-	-	2	-	-
32	Christine Hintermaier	Austria	1		-	-	1	-	-	-	-	-	-	-	-	-
	Christiane Ray	France	1		-	-	-	-	1	-	-	-	-	-	-	-
	Karianne Ruud	Norway	1		-	-	-	-	-	1	-	-	-	-	-	-
	Felicity Field	United Kingdom	1		-	-	-	-	-	-	-	-	-	-	-	1
	Maria Roberta Schranz	Italy	1		-	-	-	-	-	-	-	-	-	-	-	1

Alpine skiing World Cup
Women

Overall | Downhill | Giant slalom | Slalom

1970
