= 1969 Alpine Skiing World Cup – Women's slalom =

1969 Women's slalom World Cup
Previous: 1968	Next: 1970

Women's slalom World Cup 1968/1969

== Final point standings ==
In women's slalom World Cup 1968/69 the best 3 results count. Deductions are given in brackets.

Place	Name	Country	Total points	Deduction	3 (Germany)	4 (Switzerland)	7 (Austria)	8 (France)	11 (Italy)	13 (Czechoslovakia)	15 (United States)	18 (Canada)	20 (United States)
1	Gertrude Gabl	Austria	75	(22)	25	25	(20)	(2)	-	25	-	-	-
2	Kiki Cutter	United States	70	(38)	(4)	(15)	(15)	(4)	-	20	-	25	25
3	Ingrid Lafforgue	France	65	(40)	(2)	(1)	(3)	25	(8)	(15)	20	20	(11)
4	Judy Nagel	United States	60	(41)	20	(11)	-	15	25	-	(15)	-	(15)
5	Annie Famose	France	51	(11)	11	20	(11)	20	-	-	-	-	-
	Rosi Mittermaier	West Germany	51	(6)	-	6	25	-	-	(6)	-	-	20
7	Florence Steurer	France	41	(16)	(3)	(4)	-	(3)	15	11	-	15	(6)
	Bernadette Rauter	Austria	41		-	-	-	-	-	8	25	8	-
9	Cathy Nagel	United States	37		6	-	-	11	20	-	-	-	-
10	Barbara Ann Cochran	United States	27	(6)	-	-	8	8	(3)	-	-	11	(3)
11	Michèle Jacot	France	17		-	-	-	6	11	-	-	-	-
12	Marilyn Cochran	United States	15		15	-	-	-	-	-	-	-	-
	Gina Hathorn	United Kingdom	15	(2)	-	3	6	-	6	-	-	(2)	-
14	Fernande Bochatay	Switzerland	12		-	8	4	-	-	-	-	-	-
	Wiltrud Drexel	Austria	12		-	-	-	-	-	-	8	-	4
16	Annemarie Pröll	Austria	11		-	-	-	-	-	-	11	-	-
	Monika Kaserer	Austria	11	(5)	(1)	-	-	-	4	3	4	(3)	(1)
	Britt Lafforgue	France	11	(1)	-	-	1	-	(1)	-	6	4	-
19	Glorianda Cipolla	Italy	10		8	2	-	-	-	-	-	-	-
20	Isabelle Mir	France	9		-	-	2	-	-	4	3	-	-
21	Betsy Clifford	Canada	8		-	-	-	-	-	-	-	-	8
22	Annerösli Zryd	Switzerland	7		-	-	-	-	-	-	1	6	-
23	Rosi Fortna	United States	3		-	-	-	-	-	-	3	-	-
24	Heidi Zimmermann	Austria	2		-	-	-	-	2	-	-	-	-
	Olga Pall	Austria	2		-	-	-	-	-	2	-	-	-
	Julie Wolcott	United States	2		-	-	-	-	-	-	-	-	2
27	Erica Skinger	United States	1		-	-	-	1	-	-	-	-	-
	Traudl Treichl	West Germany	1		-	-	-	-	-	1	-	-	-
	Maria Roberta Schranz	Italy	1		-	-	-	-	-	-	-	1	-

Alpine skiing World Cup
Women

Overall | Downhill | Giant slalom | Slalom

1969
