= 1970 Alpine Skiing World Cup – Women's downhill =

1970 Women's downhill World Cup
Previous: 1969	Next: 1971

Women's downhill World Cup 1969/1970

== Final point standings ==
In women's downhill World Cup 1969/70 the best 3 results count. Deductions are given in ().

Place	Name	Country	Total points	Deduction	8 (Switzerland)	10 (Austria)	15 (Germany)	18 (Italy)	21 (United States)
1	Isabelle Mir	France	75	(31)	25	25	(11)	(20)	25
2	Annie Famose	France	48	(3)	20	(3)	8	-	20
3	Florence Steurer	France	46	(6)	15	20	-	(6)	11
4	Michèle Jacot	France	45	(3)	-	15	15	(3)	15
5	Françoise Macchi	France	44	(6)	(6)	11	25	-	8
6	Wiltrud Drexel	Austria	31		11	-	20	-	-
7	Annerösli Zryd	Switzerland	27		-	-	2	25	-
8	Annemarie Pröll	Austria	23		8	-	-	15	-
9	Ingrid Gfölner	Austria	14		-	6	-	8	-
10	Judy Crawford	Canada	11		-	-	-	11	-
11	Judy Nagel	United States	10		-	-	4	-	6
12	Olga Pall	Austria	8		-	8	-	-	-
13	Margret Hafen	West Germany	7		-	-	3	4	-
	Rosi Mittermaier	West Germany	7		3	-	-	-	4
	Karen Budge	United States	7		-	-	6	-	1
16	Betsy Clifford	Canada	5		1	4	-	-	-
	Marilyn Cochran	United States	5		-	1	-	2	2
18	Ingrid Lafforgue	France	4		4	-	-	-	-
	Giustina Demetz	Italy	4		2	2	-	-	-
20	Divina Galica	United Kingdom	3		-	-	-	-	3
21	Jacqueline Rouvier	France	1		1	-	-	-	-
	Karianne Christiansen	Norway	1		-	-	-	1	-

Alpine skiing World Cup
Women

Overall | Downhill | Giant slalom | Slalom

1970
