= List of FIS Alpine Ski World Cup winners of women's discipline titles =

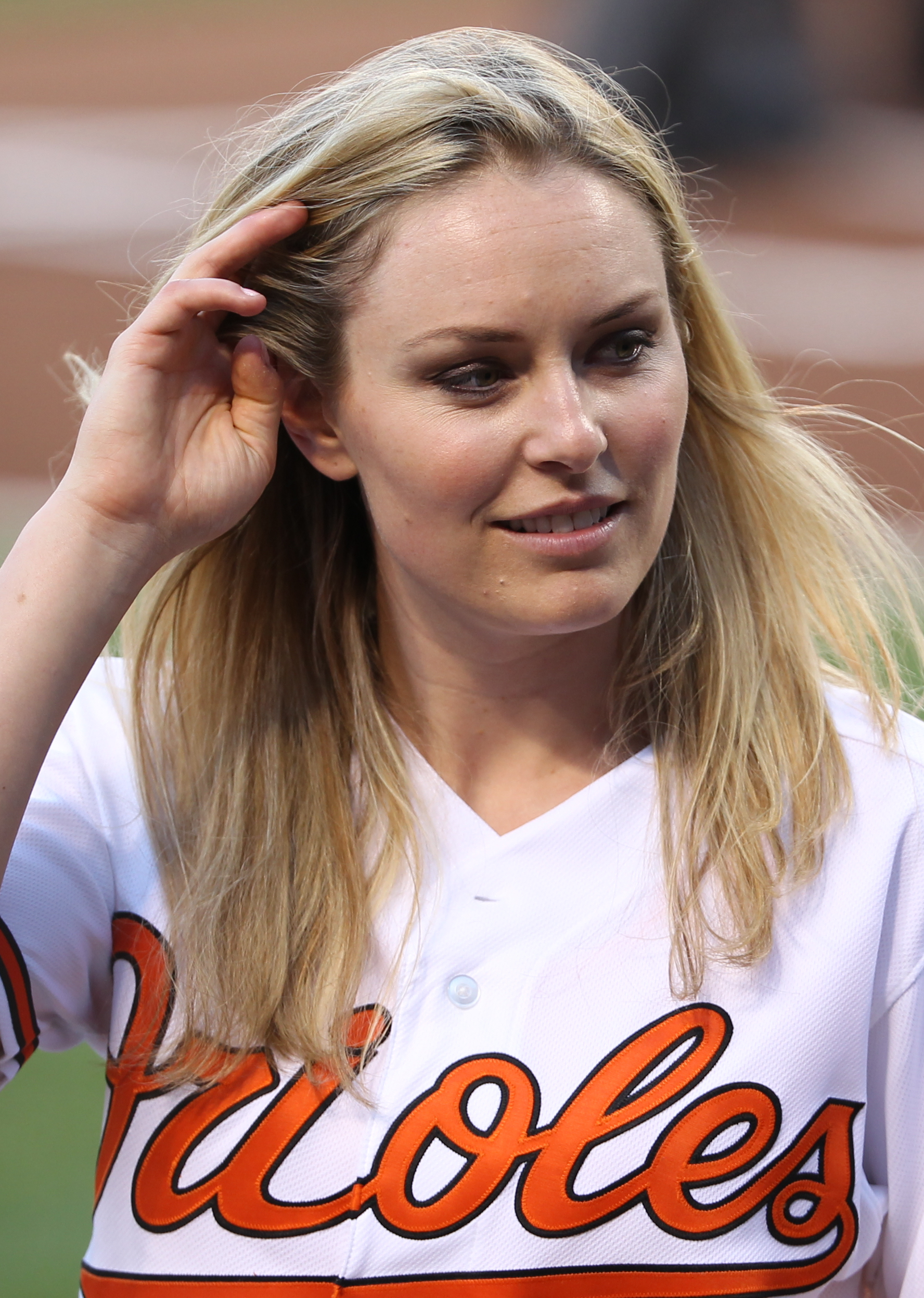
Lindsey Vonn, winner of 16 discipline titles

This is a complete list of FIS Alpine Ski World Cup winners of women's discipline titles, the list is completed by the second and third classified.

== Podiums standings ==
#	Skier	Period	1st	2nd	3rd
1	(United States) Lindsey Vonn	2001–active	16	5	6
2	(United States) Mikaela Shiffrin	2011–active	12	6	5
3	(Austria) Annemarie Moser-Pröll	1969–1980	12	5	5
4	(Switzerland) Vreni Schneider	1984–1995	11	5	3
5	(Austria) Renate Götschl	1993–2009	10	9	3
6	(Germany) Katja Seizinger	1989–1999	9	5	2
7	(Liechtenstein) Hanni Wenzel	1972–1984	7	6	4
8	(Switzerland) Lara Gut-Behrami	2008–active	7	4	4
9	(Croatia) Janica Kostelić	1998–2007	7	2	2
10	(Italy) Federica Brignone	2010-active	6	7	3

== Season-end podiums ==
=== Slalom ===
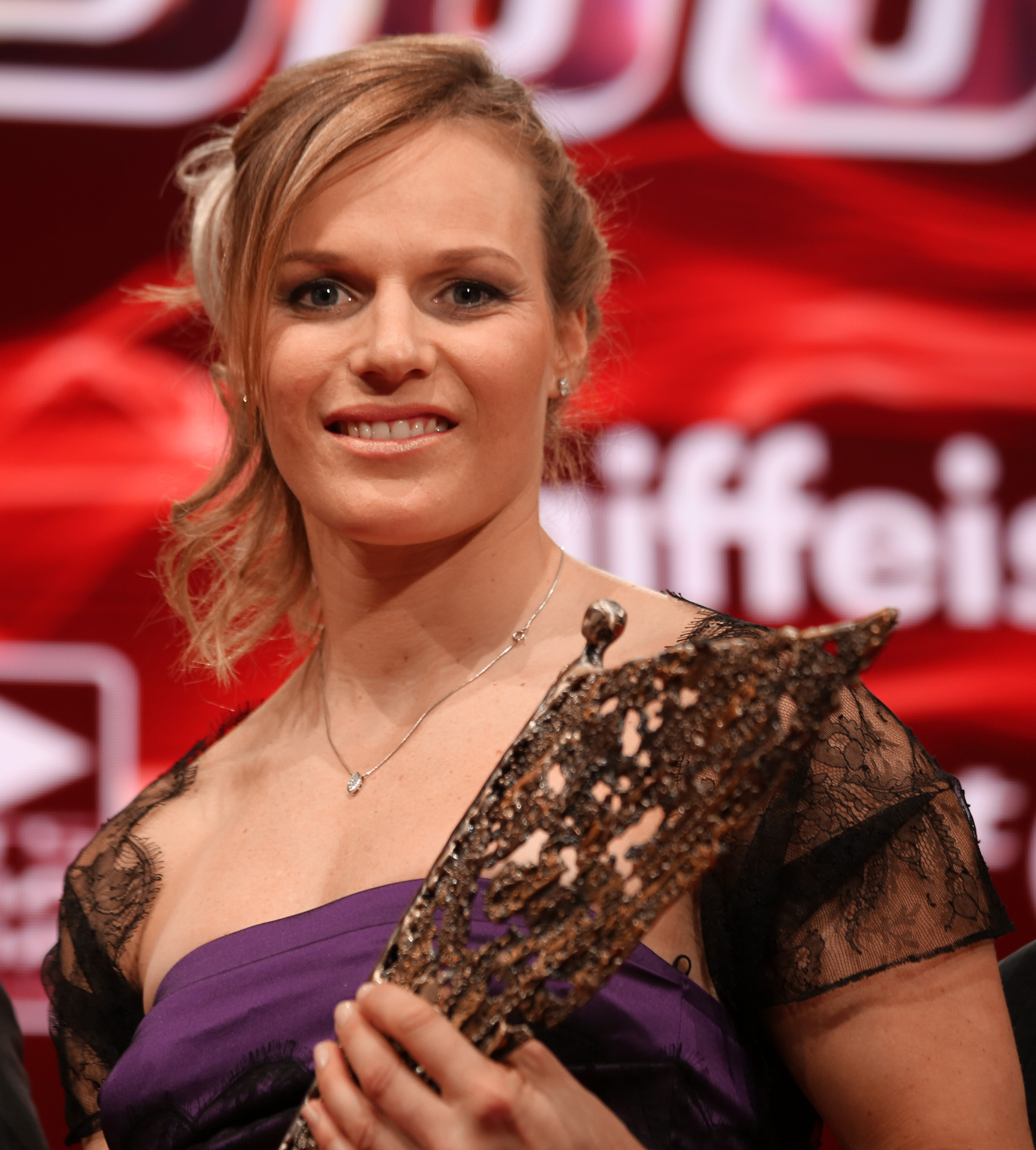
The Austrian Marlies Schild 4 discipline titles and 35 race victories in slalom.

In the following table ladies's slalom World Cup season-end podiums since first season in 1967.

Season	1st	2nd	3rd
1967	(France) Marielle Goitschel (France) Annie Famose		(Canada) Nancy Greene
1968	(France) Marielle Goitschel	(France) Florence Steurer (Austria) Gertrude Gabl	
1969	(Austria) Gertrude Gabl	(United States) Kiki Cutter	(France) Ingrid Lafforgue
1970	(France) Ingrid Lafforgue	(France) Michèle Jacot (United States) Barbara Cochran	
1971	(France) Britt Lafforgue (Canada) Betsy Clifford		(Austria) Annemarie Pröll (United States) Barbara Cochran
1972	(France) Britt Lafforgue	(France) Florence Steurer (France) Françoise Macchi	
1973	(France) Patricia Emonet	(Germany) Rosi Mittermaier	(Austria) Monika Kaserer
1974	(Germany) Christa Zechmeister	(Germany) Rosi Mittermaier	(France) Fabienne Serrat
1975	(Switzerland) Lise-Marie Morerod	(Liechtenstein) Hanni Wenzel	(Germany) Christa Zechmeister
1976	(Germany) Rosi Mittermaier	(Switzerland) Lise-Marie Morerod	(France) Danièle Debernard
1977	(Switzerland) Lise-Marie Morerod	(France) Perrine Pelen	(Italy) Claudia Giordani
1978	(Liechtenstein) Hanni Wenzel	(France) Perrine Pelen	(France) Fabienne Serrat
1979	(Austria) Regina Sackl	(Austria) Annemarie Moser-Pröll	(Austria) Lea Sölkner
1980	(France) Perrine Pelen	(Liechtenstein) Hanni Wenzel	(Austria) Annemarie Moser-Pröll
1981	(Switzerland) Erika Hess	(United States) Christin Cooper	(France) Perrine Pelen (Italy) Daniela Zini
1982	(Switzerland) Erika Hess	(Liechtenstein) Ursula Konzett	(United States) Christin Cooper
1983	(Switzerland) Erika Hess	(United States) Tamara McKinney	(Italy) Maria Rosa Quario
1984	(United States) Tamara McKinney	(Austria) Roswitha Steiner	(France) Perrine Pelen
1985	(Switzerland) Erika Hess	(United States) Tamara McKinney	(France) Perrine Pelen
1986	(Austria) Roswitha Steiner	(Switzerland) Erika Hess	(France) Perrine Pelen
1987	(Switzerland) Corinne Schmidhauser	(United States) Tamara McKinney	(Switzerland) Erika Hess
1988	(Austria) Roswitha Steiner	(Switzerland) Vreni Schneider	(Austria) Anita Wachter
1989	(Switzerland) Vreni Schneider	(Austria) Monika Maierhofer	(United States) Tamara McKinney
1990	(Switzerland) Vreni Schneider	(Austria) Claudia Strobl	(Austria) Ida Ladstätter
1991	(Austria) Petra Kronberger	(Sweden) Pernilla Wiberg	(Spain) Blanca Fernandez Ochoa
1992	(Switzerland) Vreni Schneider	(Sweden) Pernilla Wiberg	(Spain) Blanca Fernandez Ochoa
1993	(Switzerland) Vreni Schneider	(New Zealand) Annelise Coberger	(France) Patricia Chauvet
1994	(Switzerland) Vreni Schneider	(Sweden) Pernilla Wiberg	(Slovenia) Urška Hrovat
1995	(Switzerland) Vreni Schneider	(Sweden) Pernilla Wiberg	(Germany) Martina Ertl
1996	(Austria) Elfi Eder	(Slovenia) Urška Hrovat	(Sweden) Pernilla Wiberg
1997	(Sweden) Pernilla Wiberg	(New Zealand) Claudia Riegler	(Italy) Deborah Compagnoni
1998	(Sweden) Ylva Nowén	(United States) Kristina Koznick	(Germany) Hilde Gerg
1999	(Austria) Sabine Egger	(Sweden) Pernilla Wiberg	(Sweden) Anja Pärson
2000	(Slovenia) Špela Pretnar	(France) Christel Pascal	(Sweden) Anja Pärson
2001	(Croatia) Janica Kostelić	(Switzerland) Sonja Nef	(Germany) Martina Ertl-Renz
2002	(France) Laure Pequegnot	(United States) Kristina Koznick	(Sweden) Anja Pärson
2003	(Croatia) Janica Kostelić	(Sweden) Anja Pärson	(Finland) Tanja Poutiainen
2004	(Sweden) Anja Pärson	(Austria) Marlies Schild	(Germany) Monika Bergmann
2005	(Finland) Tanja Poutiainen	(Croatia) Janica Kostelić	(Austria) Marlies Schild
2006	(Croatia) Janica Kostelić	(Austria) Marlies Schild	(Sweden) Anja Pärson
2007	(Austria) Marlies Schild	(Austria) Nicole Hosp	(Czech Republic) Sarka Záhrobská
2008	(Austria) Marlies Schild	(Austria) Nicole Hosp	(Slovakia) Veronika Zuzulová
2009	(Germany) Maria Riesch	(Czech Republic) Sarka Záhrobská	(United States) Lindsey Vonn
2010	(Germany) Maria Riesch	(Austria) Kathrin Zettel	(Austria) Marlies Schild
2011	(Austria) Marlies Schild	(Finland) Tanja Poutiainen	(Germany) Maria Riesch
2012	(Austria) Marlies Schild	(Austria) Michaela Kirchgasser	(Slovenia) Tina Maze
2013	(United States) Mikaela Shiffrin	(Slovenia) Tina Maze	(Slovakia) Veronika Velez-Zuzulová
2014	(United States) Mikaela Shiffrin	(Sweden) Frida Hansdotter	(Austria) Marlies Schild
2015	(United States) Mikaela Shiffrin	(Sweden) Frida Hansdotter	(Slovenia) Tina Maze
2016	(Sweden) Frida Hansdotter	(Slovakia) Veronika Velez-Zuzulová	(Switzerland) Wendy Holdener
2017	(United States) Mikaela Shiffrin	(Slovakia) Veronika Velez-Zuzulová	(Switzerland) Wendy Holdener
2018	(United States) Mikaela Shiffrin	(Switzerland) Wendy Holdener	(Sweden) Frida Hansdotter
2019	(United States) Mikaela Shiffrin	(Slovakia) Petra Vlhová	(Switzerland) Wendy Holdener
2020	(Slovakia) Petra Vlhová	(United States) Mikaela Shiffrin	(Austria) Katharina Liensberger
2021	(Austria) Katharina Liensberger	(United States) Mikaela Shiffrin	(Slovakia) Petra Vlhová
2022	(Slovakia) Petra Vlhová	(United States) Mikaela Shiffrin	(Germany) Lena Dürr
2023	(United States) Mikaela Shiffrin	(Switzerland) Wendy Holdener	(Slovakia) Petra Vlhová
2024	(United States) Mikaela Shiffrin	(Germany) Lena Dürr	(Slovakia) Petra Vlhová
2025	(Croatia) Zrinka Ljutić	(Austria) Katharina Liensberger	(Switzerland) Camille Rast

=== Downhill ===
In the following table ladies's downhill World Cup season-end podiums since first season in 1967.

Season	1st	2nd	3rd
1967	(France) Marielle Goitschel	(France) Isabelle Mir	(Italy) Giustina Demetz
1968	(France) Isabelle Mir (Austria) Olga Pall		(Austria) Christl Haas
1969	(Austria) Wiltrud Drexel	(France) Isabelle Mir	(Austria) Olga Pall
1970	(France) Isabelle Mir	(France) Annie Famose	(France) Florence Steurer
1971	(Austria) Annemarie Pröll	(Austria) Wiltrud Drexel	(France) Françoise Macchi
1972	(Austria) Annemarie Pröll	(Austria) Wiltrud Drexel	(Switzerland) Marie-Theres Nadig
1973	(Austria) Annemarie Pröll	(Austria) Wiltrud Drexel	(France) Jacqueline Rouvier
1974	(Austria) Annemarie Moser-Pröll	(Switzerland) Marie-Theres Nadig	(Austria) Wiltrud Drexel
1975	(Austria) Annemarie Moser-Pröll	(Switzerland) Bernadette Zurbriggen	(Switzerland) Marie-Theres Nadig
1976	(Austria) Brigitte Totschnig	(Switzerland) Bernadette Zurbriggen	(Austria) Nicola Spiess
1977	(Austria) Brigitte Totschnig	(Austria) Annemarie Moser-Pröll	(Switzerland) Marie-Theres Nadig
1978	(Austria) Annemarie Moser-Pröll	(United States) Cindy Nelson	(Switzerland) Marie-Theres Nadig
1979	(Austria) Annemarie Moser-Pröll	(Switzerland) Bernadette Zurbriggen	(Switzerland) Marie-Theres Nadig
1980	(Switzerland) Marie-Theres Nadig	(Austria) Annemarie Moser-Pröll	(Liechtenstein) Hanni Wenzel
1981	(Switzerland) Marie-Theres Nadig	(Switzerland) Doris de Agostini	(Austria) Cornelia Pröll
1982	(France) M.-C. Gros-Gaudenier	(United States) Holly Flanders (Switzerland) Doris de Agostini	
1983	(Switzerland) Doris de Agostini	(Switzerland) Maria Walliser	(Austria) Elisabeth Kirchler
1984	(Switzerland) Maria Walliser	(Germany) Irene Epple	(Liechtenstein) Hanni Wenzel
1985	(Switzerland) Michela Figini	(Switzerland) Maria Walliser	(Switzerland) Brigitte Örtli
1986	(Switzerland) Maria Walliser	(Austria) Katharina Gutensohn	(Canada) Laurie Graham
1987	(Switzerland) Michela Figini	(Switzerland) Maria Walliser	(Canada) Laurie Graham
1988	(Switzerland) Michela Figini	(Switzerland) Brigitte Örtli	(Switzerland) Maria Walliser
1989	(Switzerland) Michela Figini	(Switzerland) Maria Walliser	(Germany) Michaela Gerg-Leitner
1990	(Germany) Katharina Gutensohn	(Austria) Petra Kronberger	(Germany) Michaela Gerg-Leitner (Switzerland) Michela Figini
1991	(Switzerland) Chantal Bournissen	(Austria) Sabine Ginther	(Austria) Petra Kronberger
1992	(Germany) Katja Seizinger	(Austria) Petra Kronberger	(Germany) Miriam Vogt
1993	(Germany) Katja Seizinger	(Germany) Regina Häusl	(Canada) Kerrin Lee-Gartner
1994	(Germany) Katja Seizinger	(Canada) Kate Pace	(France) Mélanie Suchet
1995	(United States) Picabo Street	(United States) Hilary Lindh	(Germany) Katja Seizinger
1996	(United States) Picabo Street	(Germany) Katja Seizinger	(Italy) Isolde Kostner (Switzerland) Heidi Zurbriggen
1997	(Austria) Renate Götschl	(Switzerland) Heidi Zurbriggen	(Russia) Varvara Zelenskaya
1998	(Germany) Katja Seizinger	(Austria) Renate Götschl	(Italy) Isolde Kostner
1999	(Austria) Renate Götschl	(Austria) Alexandra Meissnitzer	(Austria) Michaela Dorfmeister
2000	(Germany) Regina Häusl	(Austria) Renate Götschl	(Italy) Isolde Kostner
2001	(Italy) Isolde Kostner	(Austria) Renate Götschl	(France) Régine Cavagnoud
2002	(Italy) Isolde Kostner	(Austria) Michaela Dorfmeister	(Switzerland) Corinne Rey-Bellet
2003	(Austria) Michaela Dorfmeister	(Austria) Renate Götschl	(United States) Kirsten Clark
2004	(Austria) Renate Götschl	(Germany) Hilde Gerg	(France) Carole Montillet
2005	(Austria) Renate Götschl	(Germany) Hilde Gerg	(Austria) Michaela Dorfmeister
2006	(Austria) Michaela Dorfmeister	(United States) Lindsey Kildow	(Austria) Renate Götschl
2007	(Austria) Renate Götschl	(United States) Julia Mancuso	(United States) Lindsey Kildow
2008	(United States) Lindsey Vonn	(Austria) Renate Götschl	(Canada) Britt Janyk
2009	(United States) Lindsey Vonn	(Austria) Andrea Fischbacher	(Germany) Maria Riesch
2010	(United States) Lindsey Vonn	(Germany) Maria Riesch	(Sweden) Anja Pärson
2011	(United States) Lindsey Vonn	(Germany) Maria Riesch	(United States) Julia Mancuso
2012	(United States) Lindsey Vonn	(Liechtenstein) Tina Weirather	(Austria) Elisabeth Görgl
2013	(United States) Lindsey Vonn	(Slovenia) Tina Maze	(Germany) Maria Höfl-Riesch
2014	(Germany) Maria Höfl-Riesch	(Austria) Anna Fenninger	(Slovenia) Tina Maze
2015	(United States) Lindsey Vonn	(Austria) Anna Fenninger	(Slovenia) Tina Maze
2016	(United States) Lindsey Vonn	(Switzerland) Fabienne Suter	(Canada) Larisa Yurkiw
2017	(Slovenia) Ilka Štuhec	(Italy) Sofia Goggia	(Switzerland) Lara Gut
2018	(Italy) Sofia Goggia	(United States) Lindsey Vonn	(Liechtenstein) Tina Weirather
2019	(Austria) Nicole Schmidhofer	(Austria) Stephanie Venier	(Austria) Ramona Siebenhofer
2020	(Switzerland) Corinne Suter	(Czech Republic) Ester Ledecka	(Italy) Federica Brignone
2021	(Italy) Sofia Goggia	(Switzerland) Corinne Suter	(Switzerland) Lara Gut-Behrami
2022	(Italy) Sofia Goggia	(Switzerland) Corinne Suter	(Czech Republic) Ester Ledecká
2023	(Italy) Sofia Goggia	(Slovenia) Ilka Štuhec	(Switzerland) Corinne Suter
2024	(Austria) Cornelia Hütter	(Switzerland) Lara Gut-Behrami	(Italy) Sofia Goggia
2025	(Italy) Federica Brignone	(Austria) Cornelia Hütter	(Italy) Sofia Goggia

=== Giant slalom ===
In the following table ladies's giant slalom World Cup season-end podiums since first season in 1967.

Season	1st	2nd	3rd
1967	(Canada) Nancy Greene	(Austria) Erika Schinegger	(France) Annie Famose
1968	(Canada) Nancy Greene	(Switzerland) Fernande Bochatay	(France) Florence Steurer
1969	(United States) Marilyn Cochran	(France) Michèle Jacot	(Austria) Gertrude Gabl
1970	(France) Françoise Macchi (France) Michèle Jacot		(Austria) Annemarie Pröll
1971	(Austria) Annemarie Pröll	(France) Michèle Jacot	(France) Françoise Macchi
1972	(Austria) Annemarie Pröll	(Austria) Monika Kaserer	(France) Britt Lafforgue
1973	(Austria) Monika Kaserer	(Austria) Annemarie Pröll	(Liechtenstein) Hanni Wenzel
1974	(Liechtenstein) Hanni Wenzel	(France) Fabienne Serrat	(Austria) Monika Kaserer
1975	(Austria) Annemarie Moser-Pröll	(France) Fabienne Serrat	(Austria) Monika Kaserer
1976	(Switzerland) Lise-Marie Morerod	(Austria) Monika Kaserer	(Germany) Rosi Mittermaier
1977	(Switzerland) Lise-Marie Morerod	(Austria) Monika Kaserer	(Austria) Annemarie Moser-Pröll
1978	(Switzerland) Lise-Marie Morerod	(Liechtenstein) Hanni Wenzel	(Germany) Maria Epple
1979	(Germany) Christa Kinshofer	(Liechtenstein) Hanni Wenzel	(Germany) Irene Epple
1980	(Liechtenstein) Hanni Wenzel	(Switzerland) Marie-Theres Nadig (France) Perrine Pelen	
1981	(United States) Tamara McKinney	(Switzerland) Marie-Theres Nadig	(Switzerland) Erika Hess (Liechtenstein) Hanni Wenzel (Germany) Irene Epple
1982	(Germany) Irene Epple	(Germany) Maria Epple	(Switzerland) Erika Hess
1983	(United States) Tamara McKinney	(United States) Cindy Nelson	(Germany) Maria Epple
1984	(Switzerland) Erika Hess	(United States) Christin Cooper	(United States) Tamara McKinney
1985	(Germany) Marina Kiehl (Switzerland) Michela Figini		(Switzerland) Vreni Schneider
1986	(Switzerland) Vreni Schneider	(Germany) Traudl Hächer	(Socialist Federal Republic of Yugoslavia) Mateja Svet
1987	(Switzerland) Maria Walliser (Switzerland) Vreni Schneider		(Spain) Blanca Fernandez Ochoa
1988	(Socialist Federal Republic of Yugoslavia) Mateja Svet	(France) Catherine Quittet	(Switzerland) Vreni Schneider
1989	(Switzerland) Vreni Schneider	(Socialist Federal Republic of Yugoslavia) Mateja Svet	(Switzerland) Maria Walliser
1990	(Austria) Anita Wachter	(Socialist Federal Republic of Yugoslavia) Mateja Svet	(Austria) Petra Kronberger
1991	(Switzerland) Vreni Schneider	(Austria) Anita Wachter	(Sweden) Pernilla Wiberg
1992	(France) Carole Merle	(Switzerland) Vreni Schneider	(United States) Diann Roffe
1993	(France) Carole Merle	(Austria) Anita Wachter	(Germany) Martina Ertl
1994	(Austria) Anita Wachter	(Switzerland) Vreni Schneider	(Italy) Deborah Compagnoni
1995	(Switzerland) Vreni Schneider	(Switzerland) Heidi Zeller-Bähler	(Slovenia) Špela Pretnar
1996	(Germany) Martina Ertl	(Germany) Katja Seizinger	(Austria) Anita Wachter
1997	(Italy) Deborah Compagnoni	(Germany) Katja Seizinger	(Austria) Anita Wachter
1998	(Germany) Martina Ertl	(Italy) Deborah Compagnoni	(Austria) Alexandra Meissnitzer
1999	(Austria) Alexandra Meissnitzer	(Austria) Anita Wachter	(Norway) Andrine Flemmen
2000	(Austria) Michaela Dorfmeister	(Switzerland) Sonja Nef	(Austria) Anita Wachter
2001	(Switzerland) Sonja Nef	(Sweden) Anja Pärson	(Austria) Michaela Dorfmeister
2002	(Switzerland) Sonja Nef	(Austria) Michaela Dorfmeister	(Sweden) Anja Pärson
2003	(Sweden) Anja Pärson	(Italy) Karen Putzer	(Croatia) Janica Kostelic
2004	(Sweden) Anja Pärson	(Italy) Denise Karbon	(Spain) María José Rienda
2005	(Finland) Tanja Poutiainen	(Sweden) Anja Pärson	(Spain) María José Rienda
2006	(Sweden) Anja Pärson	(Spain) María José Rienda	(Croatia) Janica Kostelic
2007	(Austria) Nicole Hosp	(Finland) Tanja Poutiainen	(Austria) Michaela Kirchgasser
2008	(Italy) Denise Karbon	(Austria) Elisabeth Görgl	(Italy) Manuela Mölgg
2009	(Finland) Tanja Poutiainen	(Austria) Kathrin Zettel	(Slovenia) Tina Maze
2010	(Germany) Kathrin Hölzl	(Austria) Kathrin Zettel	(Slovenia) Tina Maze
2011	(Germany) Viktoria Rebensburg	(France) Tessa Worley	(Finland) Tanja Poutiainen
2012	(Germany) Viktoria Rebensburg	(United States) Lindsey Vonn	(France) Tessa Worley
2013	(Slovenia) Tina Maze	(Austria) Anna Fenninger	(Germany) Viktoria Rebensburg
2014	(Austria) Anna Fenninger	(Sweden) Jessica Lindell-Vikarby	(Sweden) Maria Pietilä Holmner
2015	(Austria) Anna Fenninger	(Austria) Eva-Maria Brem	(United States) Mikaela Shiffrin
2016	(Austria) Eva-Maria Brem	(Germany) Viktoria Rebensburg	(Switzerland) Lara Gut
2017	(France) Tessa Worley	(United States) Mikaela Shiffrin	(Italy) Sofia Goggia
2018	(Germany) Viktoria Rebensburg	(France) Tessa Worley	(United States) Mikaela Shiffrin
2019	(United States) Mikaela Shiffrin	(Slovakia) Petra Vlhová	(France) Tessa Worley
2020	(Italy) Federica Brignone	(Slovakia) Petra Vlhová	(United States) Mikaela Shiffrin
2021	(Italy) Marta Bassino	(United States) Mikaela Shiffrin	(France) Tessa Worley
2022	(France) Tessa Worley	(Sweden) Sara Hector	(United States) Mikaela Shiffrin
2023	(United States) Mikaela Shiffrin	(Switzerland) Lara Gut-Behrami	(Italy) Marta Bassino
2024	(Switzerland) Lara Gut-Behrami	(Italy) Federica Brignone	(Sweden) Sara Hector
2025	(Italy) Federica Brignone	(New Zealand) Alice Robinson	(Sweden) Sara Hector

=== Super G ===
In the following table ladies's Super-G World Cup season-end podiums since first season in 1986.

Season	1st	2nd	3rd
1986	(Germany) Marina Kiehl	(Canada) Liisa Savijarvi	(Italy) Michaela Marzola
1987	(Switzerland) Maria Walliser	(France) Catherine Quittet	(Germany) Marina Kiehl
1988	(Switzerland) Michela Figini	(Austria) Sylvia Eder	(Germany) Regine Mösenlechner (Spain) Blanca Fernández Ochoa
1989	(France) Carole Merle	(Austria) Sigrid Wolf	(Austria) Anita Wachter
1990	(France) Carole Merle	(Germany) Michaela Gerg-Leitner	(Austria) Sigrid Wolf
1991	(France) Carole Merle	(Austria) Petra Kronberger	(Germany) Michaela Gerg-Leitner
1992	(France) Carole Merle	(Norway) Merete Fjeldavlie	(Germany) Katja Seizinger
1993	(Germany) Katja Seizinger	(Austria) Ulrike Maier	(France) Carole Merle
1994	(Germany) Katja Seizinger	(Italy) Bibiana Perez	(Germany) Hilde Gerg
1995	(Germany) Katja Seizinger	(Switzerland) Heidi Zeller-Bähler	(Switzerland) Heidi Zurbriggen
1996	(Germany) Katja Seizinger	(Austria) Alexandra Meissnitzer	(Germany) Martina Ertl
1997	(Germany) Hilde Gerg	(Germany) Katja Seizinger	(Sweden) Pernilla Wiberg
1998	(Germany) Katja Seizinger	(Austria) Renate Götschl	(Italy) Isolde Kostner
1999	(Austria) Alexandra Meissnitzer	(Austria) Michaela Dorfmeister	(Germany) Martina Ertl
2000	(Austria) Renate Götschl	(Canada) Mélanie Turgeon	(Slovenia) Mojca Suhadolc
2001	(France) Régine Cavagnoud	(Austria) Renate Götschl	(France) Carole Montillet
2002	(Germany) Hilde Gerg	(Austria) Alexandra Meissnitzer	(Austria) Michaela Dorfmeister
2003	(France) Carole Montillet	(Austria) Renate Götschl	(Italy) Karen Putzer
2004	(Austria) Renate Götschl	(France) Carole Montillet	(Austria) Michaela Dorfmeister
2005	(Austria) Michaela Dorfmeister	(Austria) Renate Götschl	(United States) Lindsey Kildow
2006	(Austria) Michaela Dorfmeister	(Austria) Alexandra Meissnitzer	(Switzerland) Nadia Styger
2007	(Austria) Renate Götschl	(Austria) Nicole Hosp	(United States) Lindsey Kildow
2008	(Germany) Maria Riesch	(Austria) Elisabeth Görgl	(Switzerland) Fabienne Suter
2009	(United States) Lindsey Vonn	(Italy) Nadia Fanchini	(Switzerland) Fabienne Suter
2010	(United States) Lindsey Vonn	(Austria) Elisabeth Görgl	(Switzerland) Nadia Styger
2011	(United States) Lindsey Vonn	(Germany) Maria Riesch	(United States) Julia Mancuso
2012	(United States) Lindsey Vonn	(United States) Julia Mancuso	(Austria) Anna Fenninger
2013	(Slovenia) Tina Maze	(United States) Julia Mancuso	(Austria) Anna Fenninger
2014	(Switzerland) Lara Gut	(Austria) Anna Fenninger	(Liechtenstein) Tina Weirather
2015	(United States) Lindsey Vonn	(Austria) Anna Fenninger	(Slovenia) Tina Maze
2016	(Switzerland) Lara Gut	(Liechtenstein) Tina Weirather	(United States) Lindsey Vonn
2017	(Liechtenstein) Tina Weirather	(Slovenia) Ilka Štuhec	(Switzerland) Lara Gut
2018	(Liechtenstein) Tina Weirather	(Switzerland) Lara Gut	(Austria) Anna Veith
2019	(United States) Mikaela Shiffrin	(Austria) Nicole Schmidhofer	(Liechtenstein) Tina Weirather
2020	(Switzerland) Corinne Suter	(Italy) Federica Brignone	(Austria) Nicole Schmidhofer
2021	(Switzerland) Lara Gut-Behrami	(Italy) Federica Brignone	(Switzerland) Corinne Suter
2022	(Italy) Federica Brignone	(Italy) Elena Curtoni	(United States) Mikaela Shiffrin
2023	(Switzerland) Lara Gut-Behrami	(Italy) Federica Brignone	(Norway) Ragnhild Mowinckel
2024	(Switzerland) Lara Gut-Behrami	(Italy) Federica Brignone	(Austria) Cornelia Hütter
2025	(Switzerland) Lara Gut-Behrami	(Italy) Federica Brignone	(Italy) Sofia Goggia

=== Combined ===
In the following table ladies's combined World Cup season-end podiums since first season in 1975.

Season	1st	2nd	3rd
Classic Combined
1975	(Austria) Annemarie Moser-Pröll	(Liechtenstein) Hanni Wenzel	(Germany) Rosi Mittermaier
1976	(Germany) Rosi Mittermaier	(Switzerland) Bernadette Zurbriggen	(United States) Cindy Nelson
1977	(Liechtenstein) Hanni Wenzel	(Switzerland) Lise-Marie Morerod	(Austria) Annemarie Moser-Pröll
1978	not held		
1979	(Austria) Annemarie Moser-Pröll (Liechtenstein) Hanni Wenzel		(United States) Cindy Nelson
1980	(Liechtenstein) Hanni Wenzel	(Austria) Annemarie Moser-Pröll	(United States) Cindy Nelson
1981	(Switzerland) Marie-Theres Nadig	(Liechtenstein) Hanni Wenzel	(Germany) Christa Kinshofer
1982	(Germany) Irene Epple	(Switzerland) Erika Hess	(United States) Cindy Nelson
1983	(Liechtenstein) Hanni Wenzel	(Austria) Elisabeth Kirchler	(Germany) Irene Epple
1984	(Switzerland) Erika Hess	(Germany) Irene Epple	(Czech Republic) Olga Charvátová
1985	(Switzerland) Brigitte Örtli	(Switzerland) Michela Figini	(Switzerland) Maria Walliser
1986	(Switzerland) Maria Walliser	(Switzerland) Erika Hess	(Switzerland) Michela Figini
1987	(Switzerland) Brigitte Örtli	(Switzerland) Vreni Schneider	(Switzerland) Erika Hess
1988	(Switzerland) Brigitte Örtli	(Austria) Anita Wachter	(Canada) Karen Percy (Austria) Petra Kronberger
1989	(Switzerland) Brigitte Örtli	(Austria) Ulrike Maier	(Switzerland) Vreni Schneider
1990	(Austria) Anita Wachter	(Germany) Michaela Gerg-Leitner	(Austria) Petra Kronberger (Switzerland) Brigitte Örtli
1991	(Austria) Sabine Ginther (France) Florence Masnada		(Austria) Ingrid Stöckl
1992	(Austria) Sabine Ginther	(Germany) Miriam Vogt	(Austria) Anita Wachter
1993	(Austria) Anita Wachter	(Germany) Miriam Vogt	(Italy) Morena Gallizio
1994	(Sweden) Pernilla Wiberg	(Italy) Bibiana Perez	(Austria) Renate Götschl
1995	(Sweden) Pernilla Wiberg	(Switzerland) Vreni Schneider	(Germany) Martina Ertl
1996	(Austria) Anita Wachter	(Norway) Ingeborg Helen Marken	(Germany) Hilde Gerg
1997	(Sweden) Pernilla Wiberg	(Germany) Hilde Gerg	(Austria) Anita Wachter
1998	(Germany) Hilde Gerg	(Germany) Katja Seizinger (Germany) Martina Ertl	
1999	(Germany) Hilde Gerg	(Croatia) Janica Kostelic	(Norway) Trude Gimle
2000	(Austria) Renate Götschl	(United States) Caroline Lalive	(Norway) Andrine Flemmen
2001	(Croatia) Janica Kostelic	(United States) Caroline Lalive	(Austria) Renate Götschl
2002	(Austria) Renate Götschl	(Austria) Michaela Dorfmeister	(Austria) Brigitte Obermoser
2003	(Croatia) Janica Kostelic	(Germany) Martina Ertl	(Germany) Maria Riesch
2004	not held		
Super Combined
2005	(Croatia) Janica Kostelic	(Sweden) Anja Pärson	(Canada) Emily Brydon
2006	(Croatia) Janica Kostelic	(Sweden) Anja Pärson	(United States) Lindsey Kildow
2007	(Austria) Marlies Schild	(United States) Julia Mancuso	(Austria) Nicole Hosp
2008	(Germany) Maria Riesch	(United States) Lindsey Vonn	(Sweden) Anja Pärson
2009	(Sweden) Anja Pärson	(United States) Lindsey Vonn	(Austria) Kathrin Zettel
2010	(United States) Lindsey Vonn	(Sweden) Anja Pärson	(Austria) Michaela Kirchgasser
2011	(United States) Lindsey Vonn	(Slovenia) Tina Maze	(Germany) Maria Riesch
2012	(United States) Lindsey Vonn	(Slovenia) Tina Maze	(Austria) Nicole Hosp
2013	(Slovenia) Tina Maze	(Austria) Nicole Hosp	(Austria) Michaela Kirchgasser
2014	(Canada) Marie-Michèle Gagnon	(Austria) Michaela Kirchgasser	(Germany) Maria Höfl-Riesch
Alpine Combined
2015	(Austria) Anna Fenninger	(Slovenia) Tina Maze	(Austria) Kathrin Zettel
2016	(Switzerland) Wendy Holdener	(Switzerland) Lara Gut	(Austria) Michaela Kirchgasser
2017	(Slovenia) Ilka Štuhec	(Italy) Federica Brignone	(Switzerland) Wendy Holdener
2018	(Switzerland) Wendy Holdener	(Switzerland) Michelle Gisin	(Italy) Federica Brignone
2019	(Italy) Federica Brignone	(Canada) Roni Remme	(Switzerland) Wendy Holdener
2020	(Italy) Federica Brignone	(Switzerland) Wendy Holdener	(Czech Republic) Ester Ledecka
2021	not held		
2022	not held		
2023	not held		

=== Parallel ===
In the following table ladies's Parallel World Cup season-end podiums since first season in 2020.

Season	1st	2nd	3rd
2020	(Slovakia) Petra Vlhová	(France) Clara Direz	(Italy) Federica Brignone
2021	(Slovakia) Petra Vlhová	(United States) Paula Moltzan	(Switzerland) Lara Gut-Behrami
2022	(Slovenia) Andreja Slokar	(Norway) Thea Louise Stjernesund	(Norway) Kristin Lysdahl
2023	not held		

== See also ==
- List of FIS Alpine Ski World Cup winners of men's discipline titles
- List of FIS Alpine Ski World Cup men's champions
- List of FIS Alpine Ski World Cup women's champions
