= 1969 Alpine Skiing World Cup – Women's downhill =

1969 Women's downhill World Cup
Previous: 1968	Next: 1970

Women's downhill World Cup 1968/1969

== Final point standings ==
In women's downhill World Cup 1968/69 the best 3 results count. Deductions are given in brackets.

Place	Name	Country	Total points	Deduction	5 (Switzerland)	6 (Austria)	9 (France)	10 (Austria)
1	Wiltrud Drexel	Austria	65	(3)	25	25	(3)	15
2	Isabelle Mir	France	60	(11)	15	(11)	25	20
3	Olga Pall	Austria	36		-	-	11	25
4	Annie Famose	France	35		-	15	20	-
5	Rosi Mittermaier	West Germany	20		20	-	-	-
	Florence Steurer	France	20		-	20	-	-
	Annemarie Pröll	Austria	20		-	-	20	-
8	Michèle Jacot	France	19	(3)	11	4	4	(3)
9	Giustina Demetz	Italy	14		3	-	-	11
10	Erica Skinger	United States	10		2	8	-	-
	Annerösli Zryd	Switzerland	10		-	6	-	4
12	Betsy Clifford	Canada	9		8	1	-	-
	Karen Budge	United States	9		6	2	1	-
	Jutta Knobloch	Austria	9		1	-	-	8
15	Françoise Macchi	France	8		-	-	8	-
16	Judy Crawford	Canada	6		-	-	6	-
	Ingrid Lafforgue	France	6		4	-	2	-
	Heidi Zimmermann	Austria	6		-	-	-	6
19	Judy Nagel	United States	3		-	3	-	-
20	Gertrude Gabl	Austria	3		-	-	-	3
21	Marilyn Cochran	United States	1		-	-	-	1

Alpine skiing World Cup
Women

Overall | Downhill | Giant slalom | Slalom

1969
