= 1969 Alpine Skiing World Cup – Women's giant slalom =

1969 Women's giant slalom World Cup
Previous: 1968	Next: 1970

Women's giant slalom World Cup 1968/1969

== Final point standings ==
In women's giant slalom World Cup 1968/69 the best 3 results count. Deductions are given in brackets.

Place	Name	Country	Total points	Deduction	1 (France)	2 (Germany)	12 (Italy)	14 (Czechoslovakia)	16 (United States)	17 (Canada)	19 (United States)
1	Marilyn Cochran	United States	60	(41)	-	(1)	20	20	20	(20)	(20)
2	Michèle Jacot	France	56	(2)	-	-	25	6	-	25	(2)
3	Gertrude Gabl	Austria	53	(6)	-	20	-	25	8	-	(6)
4	Florence Steurer	France	51	(4)	-	-	-	15	25	(4)	11
5	Bernadette Rauter	Austria	41		1	-	-	-	15	-	25
6	Kiki Cutter	United States	37	(4)	-	25	6	-	-	6	(4)
7	Wiltrud Drexel	Austria	34	(11)	(3)	8	-	-	11	15	(8)
8	Ingrid Lafforgue	France	32	(4)	-	11	15	(4)	6	-	-
9	Karen Budge	United States	31		-	-	-	8	-	3	20
10	Françoise Macchi	France	30		25	4	-	-	-	1	-
11	Rosi Mittermaier	West Germany	27	(2)	20	-	4	(2)	-	-	3
12	Olga Pall	Austria	23		-	20	3	-	-	-	-
13	Judy Nagel	United States	22		-	-	-	11	-	11	-
14	Fernande Bochatay	Switzerland	19		8	-	11	-	-	-	-
15	Isabelle Mir	France	17		11	-	3	-	3	-	-
16	Annie Famose	France	15		15	-	-	-	-	-	-
17	Heidi Zimmermann	Austria	14		-	-	-	3	-	11	-
18	Gina Hathorn	United Kingdom	8		-	-	8	-	-	-	-
19	Divina Galica	United Kingdom	7		-	3	-	-	4	-	-
20	Burgl Färbinger	West Germany	6		6	-	-	-	-	-	-
	Inge Jochum	Austria	6		-	6	-	-	-	-	-
22	Clotilde Fasolis	Italy	4		4	-	-	-	-	-	-
	Monika Kaserer	Austria	4		-	2	-	1	1	-	-
24	Jacquline Rouvier	France	2		2	-	-	-	-	-	-
	Julie Wolcott	United States	2		-	-	-	-	2	-	-
	Betsy Clifford	Canada	2		-	-	-	-	-	2	-
27	Annerösli Zryd	Switzerland	1		-	-	1	-	-	-	-
	Barbara Ann Cochran	United States	1		-	-	-	-	-	-	1

Alpine Skiing World Cup
Women

Overall | Downhill | Giant slalom | Slalom

1969
