= 1969–70 FIS Alpine Ski World Cup =

International sports competition

FIS Alpine Ski World Cup 1969/70
Discipline	Men	Women
Overall	(Austria) Karl Schranz	(France) Michèle Jacot
Downhill	(Austria) Karl Schranz (Austria) Karl Cordin	(France) Isabelle Mir
Giant slalom	(Italy) Gustav Thöni	(France) Françoise Macchi (France) Michèle Jacot
Slalom	(France) Patrick Russel (France) Alain Penz	(France) Ingrid Lafforgue
Nations Cup	France	France
- Nations Cup overall: France

Competition
Locations	15	13
Individual	28	26

The 4th World Cup season began in December 1969 in France and concluded in March 1970 in Norway. Karl Schranz of Austria won his second consecutive overall title. Michèle Jacot of France won the women's overall title.

For the final time, the results of the World Championships, held in 1970 in Val Gardena, Italy, were included in the World Cup standings (except for the Alpine Combined results, because that discipline was not recognized in the World Cup until the 1974/75 season). Future Olympic and World Championship results were not included as World Cup races.

Malcolm Milne of Australia won the season's first downhill at Val d'Isère in December to become the first alpine racer from the Southern Hemisphere to win a World Cup event.

== Calendar ==
=== Men ===
Event key: DH – Downhill, SL – Slalom, GS – Giant slalom
Race	Season	Date	Place	Type	Winner	Second	Third
60	1	11 December 1969	(France) Val d'Isère	GS _{020}	(Italy) Gustav Thöni	(France) Patrick Russel	(France) Jean-Noël Augert
61	2	14 December 1969	(France) Val d'Isère	DH _{017}	(Australia) Malcolm Milne	(Switzerland) Jean-Daniel Dätwyler	(Austria) Karl Schranz
62	3	20 December 1969	(Austria) Lienz	GS _{021}	(France) Patrick Russel	(Italy) Gustav Thöni	(Switzerland) Jakob Tischhauser
63	4	21 December 1969	(Austria) Lienz	SL _{025}	(France) Jean-Noël Augert	(Austria) Herbert Huber	(United States) Spider Sabich
64	5	4 January 1970	(West Germany) Hindelang	SL _{026}	(Italy) Gustav Thöni	(France) Patrick Russel	(France) Jean-Noël Augert
65	6	5 January 1970	(Switzerland) Adelboden	GS _{022}	(Austria) Karl Schranz	(West Germany) Sepp Heckelmiller	(Switzerland) Dumeng Giovanoli
66	7	10 January 1970	(Switzerland) Wengen	DH _{018}	(France) Henri Duvillard	(Austria) Karl Cordin	(Austria) Heinrich Messner
67	8	11 January 1970	(Switzerland) Wengen	SL _{027}	(France) Patrick Russel	(Switzerland) Dumeng Giovanoli	(France) Henri Bréchu
68	9	17 January 1970	(Austria) Kitzbühel	GS _{023}	(Switzerland) Dumeng Giovanoli	(Poland) Andrzej Bachleda	(Austria) Karl Schranz
69	10	18 January 1970	(Austria) Kitzbühel	SL _{028}	(France) Patrick Russel	(Italy) Gustav Thöni	(France) Jean-Noël Augert
70	11	20 January 1970	(Socialist Federal Republic of Yugoslavia) Kranjska Gora	GS _{024}	(Switzerland) Dumeng Giovanoli	(France) Patrick Russel	(France) Georges Mauduit
71	12	23 January 1970	(France) Megève	DH _{019}	(Austria) Karl Schranz	(Austria) Heinrich Messner	(France) Henri Duvillard
72	13	25 January 1970	(France) Megève	SL _{029}	(France) Patrick Russel	(France) Alain Penz	(France) Henri Bréchu
73	14	29 January 1970	(Italy) Madonna di Campiglio	GS _{025}	(Italy) Gustav Thöni	(Switzerland) Dumeng Giovanoli	(France) Jean-Noël Augert
74	15	30 January 1970	(Italy) Madonna di Campiglio	GS _{026}	(Italy) Gustav Thöni	(Switzerland) Edmund Bruggmann	(France) Jean-Noël Augert
75	16	31 January 1970	(Italy) Madonna di Campiglio	SL _{030}	(France) Henri Bréchu	(Italy) Gustav Thöni	(Switzerland) Dumeng Giovanoli
76	17	1 February 1970	(West Germany) Garmisch	DH _{020}	(Austria) Karl Schranz	(Austria) Karl Cordin	(West Germany) Franz Vogler
77	18	8 February 1970	(Italy) Val Gardena (1970 World Championships)	SL _{031}	(France) Jean-Noël Augert	(France) Patrick Russel	(United States) Billy Kidd
78	19	10 February 1970	(Italy) Val Gardena (1970 World Championships)	GS _{027}	(Austria) Karl Schranz	(Austria) Werner Bleiner	(Switzerland) Dumeng Giovanoli
79	20	15 February 1970	(Italy) Val Gardena (1970 World Championships)	DH _{021}	(Switzerland) Bernhard Russi	(Austria) Karl Cordin	(Australia) Malcolm Milne
80	21	21 February 1970	(United States) Jackson Hole	DH _{022}	(Austria) Karl Cordin	(France) Bernard Orcel	(France) Henri Duvillard
81	22	22 February 1970	(United States) Jackson Hole	SL _{032}	(France) Alain Penz	(France) Henri Bréchu	(Italy) Gustav Thöni
82	23	27 February 1970	(Canada) Vancouver	GS _{028}	(France) Alain Penz	(Austria) Werner Bleiner	(France) Patrick Russel
83	24	28 February 1970	(Canada) Vancouver	SL _{033}	(France) Alain Penz	(Italy) Gustav Thöni	(France) Patrick Russel
84	25	6 March 1970	(United States) Heavenly Valley	SL _{034}	(France) Alain Penz	(United States) Rick Chaffee	(Austria) Heinrich Messner
85	26	8 March 1970	(United States) Heavenly Valley	GS _{029}	(France) Patrick Russel	(Austria) Werner Bleiner	(Austria) Karl Schranz
86	27	13 March 1970	(Norway) Voss	GS _{030}	(Austria) Werner Bleiner	(France) Jean-Noël Augert	(Austria) Karl Schranz
87	28	15 March 1970	(Norway) Voss	SL _{035}	(France) Patrick Russel	(France) Jean-Noël Augert	(France) Henri Bréchu

Note: Races 18, 19, and 20 were the events from the Alpine World Ski Championships in Val Gardena.
This was the final time that the World Championships (or Olympics) were counted in the World Cup standings.

=== Women ===
Event key: DH – Downhill, SL – Slalom, GS – Giant slalom
Race	Season	Date	Place	Type	Winner	Second	Third
61	1	10 December 1969	(France) Val d'Isère	GS _{021}	(France) Françoise Macchi	(United States) Barbara Ann Cochran	(France) Michèle Jacot
62	2	12 December 1969	(France) Val d'Isère	SL _{027}	(France) Michèle Jacot	(United States) Barbara Ann Cochran	(France) Florence Steurer
63	3	19 December 1969	(Austria) Lienz	GS _{022}	(United States) Judy Nagel	(France) Michèle Jacot	(United States) Barbara Ann Cochran
64	4	20 December 1969	(Austria) Lienz	SL _{028}	(United States) Judy Nagel	(France) Ingrid Lafforgue	(Austria) Bernadette Rauter
65	5	3 January 1970	(West Germany) Oberstaufen	SL _{029}	(Austria) Bernadette Rauter	(France) Isabelle Mir	(France) Françoise Macchi
66	6	4 January 1970	(West Germany) Oberstaufen	GS _{023}	(France) Michèle Jacot	(France) Françoise Macchi	(United States) Barbara Ann Cochran
67	7	6 January 1970	(Switzerland) Grindelwald	SL _{030}	(France) Michèle Jacot	(Canada) Betsy Clifford	(United States) Marilyn Cochran
68	8	9 January 1970	(Switzerland) Grindelwald	DH _{015}	(France) Isabelle Mir	(France) Annie Famose	(France) Florence Steurer
69	9	13 January 1970	(Austria) Badgastein	SL _{031}	(France) Ingrid Lafforgue	(Canada) Betsy Clifford	(France) Dominique Mathieux
70	10	15 January 1970	(Austria) Badgastein	DH _{016}	(France) Isabelle Mir	(France) Florence Steurer	(France) Michèle Jacot
71	11	17 January 1970	(Socialist Federal Republic of Yugoslavia) Maribor	GS _{024}	(Austria) Annemarie Pröll	(France) Florence Steurer	(United States) Barbara Ann Cochran
72	12	18 January 1970	(Socialist Federal Republic of Yugoslavia) Maribor	SL _{032}	(United States) Barbara Ann Cochran	(France) Britt Lafforgue	(Austria) Bernadette Rauter
73	13	22 January 1970	(France) St. Gervais	SL _{033}	(United States) Kiki Cutter	(France) Ingrid Lafforgue	(France) Florence Steurer
74	14	24 January 1970	(France) St. Gervais	GS _{025}	(France) Françoise Macchi	(Austria) Annemarie Pröll	(United States) Judy Nagel
75	15	30 January 1970	(West Germany) Garmisch	DH _{017}	(France) Françoise Macchi	(Austria) Wiltrud Drexel	(France) Michèle Jacot
76	16	1 February 1970	(Italy) Abetone	GS _{026}	(France) Britt Lafforgue	(France) Marie Jean-Georges	(United States) Judy Nagel
77	17	2 February 1970	(Italy) Abetone	SL _{034}	(France) Ingrid Lafforgue	(United States) Judy Nagel	(France) Dominique Mathieux
78	18	11 February 1970	(Italy) Val Gardena (1970 World Championships)	DH _{018}	(Switzerland) Annerösli Zryd	(France) Isabelle Mir	(Austria) Annemarie Pröll
79	19	13 February 1970	(Italy) Val Gardena (1970 World Championships)	SL _{035}	(France) Ingrid Lafforgue	(United States) Barbara Ann Cochran	(France) Michèle Jacot
80	20	14 February 1970	(Italy) Val Gardena (1970 World Championships)	GS _{027}	(Canada) Betsy Clifford	(France) Ingrid Lafforgue	(France) Françoise Macchi
81	21	21 February 1970	(United States) Jackson Hole	DH _{019}	(France) Isabelle Mir	(France) Annie Famose	(France) Michèle Jacot
82	22	22 February 1970	(United States) Jackson Hole	SL _{036}	(France) Ingrid Lafforgue	(United States) Barbara Ann Cochran	(Canada) Betsy Clifford
83	23	27 February 1970	(Canada) Vancouver	GS _{028}	(France) Michèle Jacot	(United States) Barbara Ann Cochran	(United States) Judy Nagel
84	24	1 March 1970	(Canada) Vancouver	SL _{037}	(France) Ingrid Lafforgue	(France) Britt Lafforgue	(Canada) Betsy Clifford
85	25	12 March 1970	(Norway) Voss	GS _{029}	(France) Ingrid Lafforgue	(Austria) Wiltrud Drexel	(Austria) Annemarie Pröll
86	26	14 March 1970	(Norway) Voss	SL _{038}	(West Germany) Rosi Mittermaier	(France) Florence Steurer	(France) Britt Lafforgue

Note: Races 18, 19, and 20 were the events from the Alpine World Ski Championships in Val Gardena.
This was the final time that the World Championships (or Olympics) were counted in the World Cup standings.

== Men ==
=== Overall ===
see complete table

In men's overall World Cup 1969/70 the best three downhills, best three giant slaloms and best three slaloms count. 18 racers had a point deduction.

Place	Name	Country	Total	DH	GS	SL
1	Karl Schranz	Austria	148	65	65	18
2	Patrick Russel	France	145	0	70	75
3	Gustav Thöni	Italy	140	0	75	65
4	Jean-Noël Augert	France	120	0	50	70
5	Alain Penz	France	119	0	44	75
6	Dumeng Giovanoli	Switzerland	116	0	70	46
7	Werner Bleiner	Austria	83	0	65	18
8	Henri Duvillard	France	81	55	11	15
	Heinrich Messner	Austria	81	35	15	31
10	Karl Cordin	Austria	65	65	0	0
11	Henri Bréchu	France	62	0	2	60
12	Bernard Orcel	France	52	37	10	5
13	Andrzej Bachleda	Poland	50	0	32	18
14	Malcolm Milne	Australia	48	48	0	0
15	Billy Kidd	United States	45	8	8	29
	Max Rieger	West Germany	45	0	23	22

=== Downhill ===
see complete table

In men's downhill World Cup 1969/70 the best 3 results count. Five racers had a point deduction, which are given in ().

Place	Name	Country	Total	2 (France)	7 (Switzerland)	12 (France)	17 (Germany)	20 (Italy)	21 (United States)
1	Karl Schranz	Austria	65	15	(8)	25	25	(11)	(6)
	Karl Cordin	Austria	65	–	20	–	20	(20)	25
3	Henri Duvillard	France	55	(3)	25	15	–	–	15
4	Malcolm Milne	Australia	48	25	–	–	–	15	8
5	Franz Vogler	West Germany	37	–	11	11	15	–	–
	Bernhard Russi	Switzerland	37	–	1	–	11	25	–
	Bernard Orcel	France	37	11	6	–	–	–	20
8	Heinrich Messner	Austria	35	–	15	20	–	–	–
9	Jean-Daniel Dätwyler	Switzerland	28	20	4	–	4	–	(3)
10	Jean-Luc Pinel	France	20	–	–	6	3	(3)	11

=== Giant slalom ===
see complete table

In men's giant slalom World Cup 1969/70 the best 3 results count. Ten racers had a point deduction, which are given in (). Gustav Thöni won the cup with maximum points.

Place	Name	Country	Total	1 (France)	3 (Austria)	6 (Switzerland)	9 (Austria)	11 (Socialist Federal Republic of Yugoslavia)	14 (Italy)	15 (Italy)	19 (Italy)	23 (Canada)	26 (United States)	27 (Norway)
1	Gustav Thöni	Italy	75	25	(20)	–	(6)	–	25	25	–	–	–	–
2	Dumeng Giovanoli	Switzerland	70	–	(3)	(15)	25	25	20	–	(15)	(2)	–	(4)
	Patrick Russel	France	70	20	25	(11)	(8)	(20)	–	–	(3)	(15)	25	(11)
4	Karl Schranz	Austria	65	–	(6)	25	(15)	–	–	–	25	(8)	15	(15)
	Werner Bleiner	Austria	65	(4)	(11)	(4)	–	(3)	(8)	(11)	20	20	(20)	25
6	Jean-Noël Augert	France	50	15	(1)	(3)	(2)	–	15	(15)	–	–	–	20
7	Alain Penz	France	44	–	–	8	(3)	–	–	–	(2)	25	11	(8)
8	Jakob Tischhauser	Switzerland	37	–	15	–	(4)	(8)	11	(8)	–	11	–	–
9	Andrzej Bachleda	Poland	32	–	(4)	–	20	(4)	(2)	6	6	–	–	–
10	Edmund Bruggmann	Switzerland	31	–	–	–	11	–	–	20	–	–	–	–

=== Slalom ===
see complete table

In men's slalom World Cup 1969/70 the best 3 results count. 11 racers had a point deduction, which are given in (). Patrick Russel and Alain Penz won the cup with maximum points. French athletes won 10 races out of 11!

Place	Name	Country	Total	4 (Austria)	5 (West Germany)	8 (Switzerland)	10 (Austria)	13 (France)	16 (Italy)	18 (Italy)	22 (United States)	24 (Canada)	25 (United States)	28 (Norway)
1	Patrick Russel	France	75	–	(20)	25	25	25	–	(20)	–	(15)	–	(25)
	Alain Penz	France	75	–	(3)	–	(6)	(20)	–	(8)	25	25	25	–
3	Jean-Noël Augert	France	70	25	(15)	–	(15)	–	–	25	–	–	–	20
4	Gustav Thöni	Italy	65	–	25	(11)	20	–	20	(11)	(15)	(20)	–	–
	Henri Bréchu	France	60	(8)	–	(15)	(2)	15	25	–	20	–	–	(15)
6	Dumeng Giovanoli	Switzerland	46	–	–	20	11	–	15	(6)	–	(11)	–	(6)
7	Heinrich Messner	Austria	31	–	(2)	–	–	(1)	8	–	8	(6)	15	(3)
8	Billy Kidd	United States	29	–	8	6	(4)	–	–	15	–	–	–	–
9	Harald Rofner	Austria	25	3	–	–	–	–	11	–	–	–	–	11
10	Rick Chaffee	United States	23	–	–	2	–	–	–	–	–	1	20	–

== Women ==
=== Overall ===
see complete table

In women's overall World Cup 1969/70 the best three results from each discipline (downhill, giant slalom, and slalom) counted. Nineteen racers had a point deduction.

Place	Name	Country	Total	DH	GS	SL
1	Michèle Jacot	France	180	45	70	65
2	Françoise Macchi	France	145	44	70	31
3	Florence Steurer	France	133	46	37	50
4	Ingrid Lafforgue	France	132	4	53	75
5	Barbara Ann Cochran	United States	120	0	55	65
6	Judy Nagel	United States	118	10	55	53
7	Annemarie Pröll	Austria	110	23	60	27
8	Betsy Clifford	Canada	101	5	41	55
9	Isabelle Mir	France	100	75	0	25
10	Britt Lafforgue	France	87	0	32	55
11	Annie Famose	France	81	48	0	33
12	Rosi Mittermaier	West Germany	74	7	25	42
13	Bernadette Rauter	Austria	67	0	12	55
14	Marilyn Cochran	United States	62	5	23	34
15	Karen Budge	United States	58	7	28	23

=== Downhill ===
see complete table

In women's downhill World Cup 1969/70 the best 3 results count. Five racers had a point deduction, which are given in (). Isabelle Mir won the cup with maximum points.

Place	Name	Country	Total	8 (Switzerland)	10 (Austria)	15 (Germany)	18 (Italy)	21 (United States)
1	Isabelle Mir	France	75	25	25	(11)	(20)	25
2	Annie Famose	France	48	20	(3)	8	–	20
3	Florence Steurer	France	46	15	20	–	(6)	11
4	Michèle Jacot	France	45	–	15	15	(3)	15
5	Françoise Macchi	France	44	(6)	11	25	–	8
6	Wiltrud Drexel	Austria	31	11	–	20	–	–
7	Annerösli Zryd	Switzerland	27	–	–	2	25	–
8	Annemarie Pröll	Austria	23	8	–	–	15	–
9	Ingrid Gfölner	Austria	14	–	6	–	8	–
10	Judy Crawford	Canada	11	–	–	–	11	–

=== Giant slalom ===
see complete table

In women's giant slalom World Cup 1969/70 the best 3 results count. 14 racers had a point deduction, which are given in ().

Place	Name	Country	Total	1 (France)	3 (Austria)	6 (Germany)	11 (Socialist Federal Republic of Yugoslavia)	14 (France)	16 (Italy)	20 (Italy)	23 (Canada)	25 (Norway)
1	Françoise Macchi	France	70	25	(11)	20	–	25	–	(15)	–	–
	Michèle Jacot	France	70	(15)	20	25	–	–	–	(11)	25	–
3	Annemarie Pröll	Austria	60	(11)	(3)	(8)	25	20	–	–	–	15
4	Judy Nagel	United States	55	–	25	–	–	15	15	–	(15)	–
	Barbara Ann Cochran	United States	55	20	15	(15)	(15)	(8)	–	(2)	20	(2)
6	Ingrid Lafforgue	France	53	–	8	–	(8)	(6)	(2)	20	(8)	25
7	Betsy Clifford	Canada	41	8	–	(1)	–	–	8	25	(1)	–
8	Florence Steurer	France	37	–	–	(3)	20	11	6	(3)	(6)	–
9	Britt Lafforgue	France	32	–	–	(1)	–	3	25	–	(2)	4
10	Karen Budge	United States	28	(2)	–	11	(2)	(2)	11	–	(4)	6

=== Slalom ===
see complete table

In women's slalom World Cup 1969/70 the best 3 results count. 14 racers had a point deduction, which are given in (). Ingrid Lafforgue won the cup with maximum points. She won five races and four of them in a row.

Place	Name	Country	Total	2 (France)	4 (Austria)	5 (Germany)	7 (Switzerland)	9 (Austria)	12 (Socialist Federal Republic of Yugoslavia)	13 (France)	17 (Italy)	19 (Italy)	22 (United States)	24 (Canada)	26 (Norway)
1	Ingrid Lafforgue	France	75	(6)	(20)	–	–	25	–	(20)	25	25	(25)	(25)	–
2	Barbara Ann Cochran	United States	65	20	–	–	–	–	25	–	–	20	(20)	–	–
	Michèle Jacot	France	65	25	(11)	–	25	–	–	–	–	15	–	–	–
4	Bernadette Rauter	Austria	55	–	15	25	–	–	15	(3)	(11)	(2)	–	–	–
	Betsy Clifford	Canada	55	–	–	(8)	20	20	–	–	(6)	(3)	15	(15)	–
	Britt Lafforgue	France	55	(3)	(4)	–	(1)	–	20	(6)	–	–	(11)	20	15
7	Judy Nagel	United States	53	–	25	–	–	–	–	–	20	8	(6)	(6)	(6)
8	Florence Steurer	France	50	15	(4)	–	(8)	–	–	15	–	(4)	(8)	–	20
9	Rosi Mittermaier	West Germany	42	(4)	–	–	–	6	(2)	–	–	–	(4)	11	25
10	Kiki Cutter	United States	40	–	–	–	(3)	–	11	25	4	–	–	–	–

== Nations cup ==
=== Overall ===
Place	Country	Total	Men	Ladies
1	France	2156	921	1235
2	Austria	974	635	339
3	United States	714	151	563
4	Switzerland	467	434	33
5	Italy	248	243	5
6	West Germany	240	136	104
7	Canada	170	14	156
8	Poland	61	61	0
9	Australia	48	48	0
10	Norway	31	13	18
11	United Kingdom	23	0	23
12	Sweden	9	9	0
13	Spain	2	2	0

=== Men ===
Place	Country	Total	DH	GS	SL	Racers	Wins
1	France	921	121	313	487	11	14
2	Austria	635	236	259	240	10	6
3	Switzerland	434	85	237	112	14	3
4	Italy	243	12	105	126	6	4
5	United States	151	28	25	98	11	0
6	West Germany	136	37	60	39	4	0
7	Poland	61	0	42	19	1	0
8	Australia	48	48	0	0	1	1
9	Canada	14	3	7	4	2	0
10	Norway	13	1	1	11	5	0
11	Sweden	9	2	0	7	3	0
12	Spain	2	0	0	2	1	0

=== Women ===
Place	Country	Total	DH	GS	SL	Racers	Wins
1	France	1235	312	383	540	12	17
2	United States	563	22	247	294	9	4
3	Austria	339	76	139	124	8	2
4	Canada	156	16	47	93	3	1
5	West Germany	104	14	33	57	3	1
6	Switzerland	33	27	6	0	2	1
7	United Kingdom	23	3	4	16	3	0
8	Norway	18	1	0	17	3	0
9	Italy	5	4	0	1	2	0

== Medal table ==
Rank	Nation	Gold	Silver	Bronze	Total
1	France	31	24	26	81
2	Austria	8	11	10	29
3	United States	4	7	9	20
4	Switzerland	4	4	4	12
5	Italy	4	4	1	9
6	Canada	1	2	2	5
7	Germany	1	1	1	3
8	Australia	1	0	1	2
9	Poland	0	1	0	1
Totals (9 entries)		54	54	54	162
