= List of FIS Alpine Ski World Cup women's champions =

This is a complete list of women's alpine skiing World Cup champions in the overall and each discipline. Multiple World Cups in the overall and in each discipline are marked with (#).

== History ==
Combined events (calculated using results from selected downhill and slalom races) were included starting with the 1974–75 season, but a discipline trophy was only awarded during the next season (1975–76) and then once again starting with the 1979–80 season. Prior to the 2006–7 season, no trophy had been officially awarded for the combined since the late 1980s. Note that no women's combined events were completed during the 2003–4 season. The table below lists the leader of the combined standings each season even if no trophy was awarded.

The super-G was added for the 1982–83 season, but from 1983 to 1985, super-G results were included with giant slalom, and a single trophy was awarded for giant slalom.

== Overall podium ==
Name	Career			
Name	Career	1st	2nd	3rd
(Austria) Annemarie Moser-Pröll	1969–1980	6	3	–
(United States) Mikaela Shiffrin	2012–active	6	1	1
(United States) Lindsey Vonn	2001–2019	4	2	1
(Switzerland) Vreni Schneider	1984–1995	3	1	2
(Croatia) Janica Kostelić	1998–2006	3	1	–
(Austria) Petra Kronberger	1987–1993	3	–	–

In addition to these champions with at least 3 Overall Titles, many women have attained multiple Overall Podiums. Among these, Liechtenstein's Hanni Wenzel, Germany's Maria Hofl-Reich and Mikaela Shiffrin form the USA achieved the most Overall Podiums with 8, second only to Annemarie Moser-Proll's 9.

Overall Podiums Year-By-Year:

Season	1st	2nd	3rd
1967	(Canada) Nancy Greene	(France) Marielle Goitschel	(France) Annie Famose
1968	(Canada) Nancy Greene (2)	(France) Isabelle Mir	(France) Florence Steurer
1968–69	(Austria) Gertrud Gabl	(France) Florence Steurer	(Austria) Wiltrud Drexel
1969–70	(France) Michèle Jacot	(France) Françoise Macchi	(France) Florence Steurer (2)
1970–71	(Austria) Annemarie Pröll	(France) Michèle Jacot	(France) Isabelle Mir
1971–72	(Austria) Annemarie Pröll (2)	(France) Françoise Macchi (2)	(France) Britt Lafforgue
1972–73	(Austria) Annemarie Pröll (3)	(Austria) Monika Kaserer	(France) Patricia Emonet
1973–74	(Austria) Annemarie Pröll (4)	(Austria) Monika Kaserer (2)	(Liechtenstein) Hanni Wenzel
1974–75	(Austria) Annemarie Moser-Pröll (5)	(Liechtenstein) Hanni Wenzel	(West Germany) Rosi Mittermaier
1975–76	(West Germany) Rosi Mittermaier	(Switzerland) Lise-Marie Morerod	(Austria) Monika Kaserer
1976–77	(Switzerland) Lise-Marie Morerod	(Austria) Annemarie Moser-Pröll	(Austria) Monika Kaserer (2)
1977–78	(Liechtenstein) Hanni Wenzel	(Austria) Annemarie Moser-Pröll (2)	(Switzerland) Lise-Marie Morerod
1978–79	(Austria) Annemarie Moser-Pröll (6)	(Liechtenstein) Hanni Wenzel (2)	(West Germany) Irene Epple
1979–80	(Liechtenstein) Hanni Wenzel (2)	(Austria) Annemarie Moser-Pröll (3)	(Switzerland) Marie-Theres Nadig
1980–81	(Switzerland) Marie-Theres Nadig	(Switzerland) Erika Hess	(Liechtenstein) Hanni Wenzel (2)
1981–82	(Switzerland) Erika Hess	(Germany) Irene Epple	(United States) Christin Cooper
1982–83	(United States) Tamara McKinney	(Liechtenstein) Hanni Wenzel (3)	(Switzerland) Erika Hess
1983–84	(Switzerland) Erika Hess (2)	(Liechtenstein) Hanni Wenzel (4)	(United States) Tamara McKinney
1984–85	(Switzerland) Michela Figini	(Switzerland) Brigitte Oertli	(Switzerland) Maria Walliser
1985–86	(Switzerland) Maria Walliser	(Switzerland) Erika Hess (2)	(Switzerland) Vreni Schneider
1986–87	(Switzerland) Maria Walliser (2)	(Switzerland) Vreni Schneider	(Switzerland) Brigitte Oertli
1987–88	(Switzerland) Michela Figini (2)	(Switzerland) Brigitte Oertli (2)	(Austria) Anita Wachter
1988–89	(Switzerland) Vreni Schneider	(Switzerland) Maria Walliser	(Switzerland) Michela Figini
1989–90	(Austria) Petra Kronberger	(Austria) Anita Wachter	(West Germany) Michaela Gerg
1990–91	(Austria) Petra Kronberger (2)	(Austria) Sabine Ginther	(Switzerland) Vreni Schneider (2)
1991–92	(Austria) Petra Kronberger (3)	(France) Carole Merle	(Germany) Katja Seizinger
1992–93	(Austria) Anita Wachter	(Germany) Katja Seizinger	(France) Carole Merle
1993–94	(Switzerland) Vreni Schneider (2)	(Sweden) Pernilla Wiberg	(Germany) Katja Seizinger (2)
1994–95	(Switzerland) Vreni Schneider (3)	(Germany) Katja Seizinger (2)	(Switzerland) Heidi Zeller
1995–96	(Germany) Katja Seizinger	(Germany) Martina Ertl	(Austria) Anita Wachter (2)
1996–97	(Sweden) Pernilla Wiberg	(Germany) Katja Seizinger (3)	(Germany) Hilde Gerg
1997–98	(Germany) Katja Seizinger (2)	(Germany) Martina Ertl (2)	(Germany) Hilde Gerg (2)
1998–99	(Austria) Alexandra Meissnitzer	(Germany) Hilde Gerg	(Austria) Renate Götschl
1999–00	(Austria) Renate Götschl	(Austria) Michaela Dorfmeister	(France) Regine Cavagnoud
2000–01	(Croatia) Janica Kostelić	(Austria) Renate Götschl	(France) Regine Cavagnoud (2)
2001–02	(Austria) Michaela Dorfmeister	(Austria) Renate Götschl (2)	(Switzerland) Sonja Nef
2002–03	(Croatia) Janica Kostelić (2)	(Italy) Karen Putzer	(Sweden) Anja Pärson
2003–04	(Sweden) Anja Pärson	(Austria) Renate Götschl (3)	(Germany) Maria Riesch
2004–05	(Sweden) Anja Pärson (2)	(Croatia) Janica Kostelić	(Austria) Renate Götschl (2)
2005–06	(Croatia) Janica Kostelić (3)	(Sweden) Anja Pärson	(Austria) Michaela Dorfmeister
2006–07	(Austria) Nicole Hosp	(Austria) Marlies Schild	(United States) Julia Mancuso
2007–08	(United States) Lindsey Vonn	(Austria) Nicole Hosp	(Germany) Maria Riesch (2)
2008–09	(United States) Lindsey Vonn (2)	(Germany) Maria Riesch	(Sweden) Anja Pärson (2)
2009–10	(United States) Lindsey Vonn (3)	(Germany) Maria Riesch (2)	(Sweden) Anja Pärson (3)
2010–11	(Germany) Maria Riesch	(United States) Lindsey Vonn	(Slovenia) Tina Maze
2011–12	(United States) Lindsey Vonn (4)	(Slovenia) Tina Maze	(Germany) Maria Höfl-Riesch (3)
2012–13	(Slovenia) Tina Maze	(Germany) Maria Höfl-Riesch (3)	(Austria) Anna Fenninger
2013–14	(Austria) Anna Fenninger	(Germany) Maria Höfl-Riesch (4)	(Switzerland) Lara Gut
2014–15	(Austria) Anna Fenninger (2)	(Slovenia) Tina Maze (2)	(United States) Lindsey Vonn
2015–16	(Switzerland) Lara Gut	(United States) Lindsey Vonn (2)	(Germany) Viktoria Rebensburg
2016–17	(United States) Mikaela Shiffrin	(Slovenia) Ilka Stuhec	(Italy) Sofia Goggia
2017–18	(United States) Mikaela Shiffrin (2)	(Switzerland) Wendy Holdener	(Germany) Viktoria Rebensburg (2)
2018–19	(United States) Mikaela Shiffrin (3)	(Slovakia) Petra Vlhová	(Switzerland) Wendy Holdener
2019–20	(Italy) Federica Brignone	(United States) Mikaela Shiffrin	(Slovakia) Petra Vlhová
2020–21	(Slovakia) Petra Vlhová	(Switzerland) Lara Gut-Behrami	(Switzerland) Michelle Gisin
2021–22	(United States) Mikaela Shiffrin (4)	(Slovakia) Petra Vlhová (2)	(Italy) Federica Brignone
2022–23	(United States) Mikaela Shiffrin (5)	(Switzerland) Lara Gut-Behrami (2)	(Slovakia) Petra Vlhová (2)
2023–24	(Switzerland) Lara Gut-Behrami (2)	(Italy) Federica Brignone	(United States) Mikaela Shiffrin
2024–25	(Italy) Federica Brignone (2)	(Switzerland) Lara Gut-Behrami (3)	(Italy) Sofia Goggia (2)
2025–26	(United States) Mikaela Shiffrin (6)	(Germany) Emma Aicher	(Switzerland) Camille Rast

== Winners by discipline ==
Discipline		Country	Titles
Downhill	Lindsey Vonn	United States	8
Super-G	Lara Gut-Behrami	Switzerland	6
Giant slalom	Vreni Schneider	Switzerland	5
Slalom	Mikaela Shiffrin	United States	9
Combined	Brigitte Oertli	Switzerland	4
Combined	Janica Kostelić	Croatia	4
Parallel	Petra Vlhová	Slovakia	2

Year	Overall	Downhill	Super-G	Giant slalom	Slalom	Combined	Parallel
2026	(United States) Mikaela Shiffrin (6)	(Italy) Laura Pirovano	(Italy) Sofia Goggia	(Austria) Julia Scheib	(United States) Mikaela Shiffrin (9)	--	--
2025	(Italy) Federica Brignone (2)	(Italy) Federica Brignone	(Switzerland) Lara Gut-Behrami (6)	(Italy) Federica Brignone (2)	(Croatia) Zrinka Ljutić	--	--
2024	(Switzerland) Lara Gut-Behrami (2)	(Austria) Cornelia Hütter	(Switzerland) Lara Gut-Behrami (5)	(Switzerland) Lara Gut-Behrami	(United States) Mikaela Shiffrin (8)	--	--
2023	(United States) Mikaela Shiffrin (5)	(Italy) Sofia Goggia (4)	(Switzerland) Lara Gut-Behrami (4)	(United States) Mikaela Shiffrin (2)	(United States) Mikaela Shiffrin (7)	--	--
2022	(United States) Mikaela Shiffrin (4)	(Italy) Sofia Goggia (3)	(Italy) Federica Brignone	(France) Tessa Worley (2)	(Slovakia) Petra Vlhová (2)	--	(Slovenia) Andreja Slokar
2021	(Slovakia) Petra Vlhová	(Italy) Sofia Goggia (2)	(Switzerland) Lara Gut-Behrami (3)	(Italy) Marta Bassino	(Austria) Katharina Liensberger	--	(Slovakia) Petra Vlhová (2)
2020	(Italy) Federica Brignone	(Switzerland) Corinne Suter	(Switzerland) Corinne Suter	(Italy) Federica Brignone	(Slovakia) Petra Vlhová	(Italy) Federica Brignone (2)	(Slovakia) Petra Vlhová
2019	(United States) Mikaela Shiffrin (3)	(Austria) Nicole Schmidhofer	(United States) Mikaela Shiffrin	(United States) Mikaela Shiffrin	(United States) Mikaela Shiffrin (6)	(Italy) Federica Brignone	--
2018	(United States) Mikaela Shiffrin (2)	(Italy) Sofia Goggia	(Liechtenstein) Tina Weirather (2)	(Germany) Viktoria Rebensburg (3)	(United States) Mikaela Shiffrin (5)	(Switzerland) Wendy Holdener (2)	--
2017	(United States) Mikaela Shiffrin	(Slovenia) Ilka Štuhec	(Liechtenstein) Tina Weirather	(France) Tessa Worley	(United States) Mikaela Shiffrin (4)	(Slovenia) Ilka Stuhec	--
2016	(Switzerland) Lara Gut	(United States) Lindsey Vonn (8)	(Switzerland) Lara Gut (2)	(Austria) Eva-Maria Brem	(Sweden) Frida Hansdotter	(Switzerland) Wendy Holdener	--
2015	(Austria) Anna Fenninger (2)	(United States) Lindsey Vonn (7)	(United States) Lindsey Vonn (5)	(Austria) Anna Fenninger (2)	(United States) Mikaela Shiffrin (3)	(Austria) Anna Fenninger	--
2014	(Austria) Anna Fenninger	(Germany) Maria Höfl-Riesch	(Switzerland) Lara Gut	(Austria) Anna Fenninger	(United States) Mikaela Shiffrin (2)	(Canada) Marie-Michele Gagnon	--
2013	(Slovenia) Tina Maze	(United States) Lindsey Vonn (6)	(Slovenia) Tina Maze	(Slovenia) Tina Maze	(United States) Mikaela Shiffrin	(Slovenia) Tina Maze	--
2012	(United States) Lindsey Vonn (4)	(United States) Lindsey Vonn (5)	(United States) Lindsey Vonn (4)	(Germany) Viktoria Rebensburg (2)	(Austria) Marlies Schild (4)	(United States) Lindsey Vonn (3)	--
2011	(Germany) Maria Riesch	(United States) Lindsey Vonn (4)	(United States) Lindsey Vonn (3)	(Germany) Viktoria Rebensburg	(Austria) Marlies Schild (3)	(United States) Lindsey Vonn (2)	--
2010	(United States) Lindsey Vonn (3)	(United States) Lindsey Vonn (3)	(United States) Lindsey Vonn (2)	(Germany) Kathrin Hölzl	(Germany) Maria Riesch (2)	(United States) Lindsey Vonn	--
2009	(United States) Lindsey Vonn (2)	(United States) Lindsey Vonn (2)	(United States) Lindsey Vonn	(Finland) Tanja Poutiainen (2)	(Germany) Maria Riesch	(Sweden) Anja Pärson	--
2008	(United States) Lindsey Vonn	(United States) Lindsey Vonn	(Germany) Maria Riesch	(Italy) Denise Karbon	(Austria) Marlies Schild (2)	(Germany) Maria Riesch	--
2007	(Austria) Nicole Hosp	(Austria) Renate Götschl (5)	(Austria) Renate Götschl (3)	(Austria) Nicole Hosp	(Austria) Marlies Schild	(Austria) Marlies Schild	--
2006	(Croatia) Janica Kostelić (3)	(Austria) Michaela Dorfmeister (2)	(Austria) Michaela Dorfmeister (2)	(Sweden) Anja Pärson (3)	(Croatia) Janica Kostelić (3)	(Croatia) Janica Kostelić (4)	--
2005	(Sweden) Anja Pärson (2)	(Austria) Renate Götschl (4)	(Austria) Michaela Dorfmeister	(Finland) Tanja Poutiainen	(Finland) Tanja Poutiainen	(Croatia) Janica Kostelić (3)	--
2004	(Sweden) Anja Pärson	(Austria) Renate Götschl (3)	(Austria) Renate Götschl (2)	(Sweden) Anja Pärson (2)	(Sweden) Anja Pärson	--	--
2003	(Croatia) Janica Kostelić (2)	(Austria) Michaela Dorfmeister	(France) Carole Montillet	(Sweden) Anja Pärson	(Croatia) Janica Kostelić (2)	(Croatia) Janica Kostelić (2)	--
2002	(Austria) Michaela Dorfmeister	(Italy) Isolde Kostner (2)	(Germany) Hilde Gerg (2)	(Switzerland) Sonja Nef (2)	(France) Laure Péquegnot	(Austria) Renate Götschl (2)	--
2001	(Croatia) Janica Kostelić	(Italy) Isolde Kostner	(France) Régine Cavagnoud	(Switzerland) Sonja Nef	(Croatia) Janica Kostelić	(Croatia) Janica Kostelić	--
2000	(Austria) Renate Götschl	(Germany) Regina Häusl	(Austria) Renate Götschl	(Austria) Michaela Dorfmeister	(Slovenia) Špela Pretnar	(Austria) Renate Götschl	--
1999	(Austria) Alexandra Meissnitzer	(Austria) Renate Götschl (2)	(Austria) Alexandra Meissnitzer	(Austria) Alexandra Meissnitzer	(Austria) Sabine Egger	(Germany) Hilde Gerg (2)	--
1998	(Germany) Katja Seizinger (2)	(Germany) Katja Seizinger (4)	(Germany) Katja Seizinger (5)	(Germany) Martina Ertl (2)	(Sweden) Ylva Nowén	(Germany) Hilde Gerg	--
1997	(Sweden) Pernilla Wiberg	(Austria) Renate Götschl	(Germany) Hilde Gerg	(Italy) Deborah Compagnoni	(Sweden) Pernilla Wiberg	(Sweden) Pernilla Wiberg (3)	--
1996	(Germany) Katja Seizinger	(United States) Picabo Street (2)	(Germany) Katja Seizinger (4)	(Germany) Martina Ertl	(Austria) Elfi Eder	(Austria) Anita Wachter (3)	--
1995	(Switzerland) Vreni Schneider (3)	(United States) Picabo Street	(Germany) Katja Seizinger (3)	(Switzerland) Vreni Schneider (5)	(Switzerland) Vreni Schneider (6)	(Sweden) Pernilla Wiberg (2)	--
1994	(Switzerland) Vreni Schneider (2)	(Germany) Katja Seizinger (3)	(Germany) Katja Seizinger (2)	(Austria) Anita Wachter (2)	(Switzerland) Vreni Schneider (5)	(Sweden) Pernilla Wiberg	--
1993	(Austria) Anita Wachter	(Germany) Katja Seizinger (2)	(Germany) Katja Seizinger	(France) Carole Merle (2)	(Switzerland) Vreni Schneider (4)	(Austria) Anita Wachter (2)	--
1992	(Austria) Petra Kronberger (3)	(Germany) Katja Seizinger	(France) Carole Merle (4)	(France) Carole Merle	(Switzerland) Vreni Schneider (3)	(Austria) Sabine Ginther (2)	--
1991	(Austria) Petra Kronberger (2)	(Switzerland) Chantal Bournissen	(France) Carole Merle (3)	(Switzerland) Vreni Schneider (4)	(Austria) Petra Kronberger	(Austria) Sabine Ginther (France) Florence Masnada	--
1990	(Austria) Petra Kronberger	(West Germany) Katharina Gutensohn	(France) Carole Merle (2)	(Austria) Anita Wachter	(Switzerland) Vreni Schneider (2)	(Austria) Anita Wachter	--
1989	(Switzerland) Vreni Schneider	(Switzerland) Michela Figini (4)	(France) Carole Merle	(Switzerland) Vreni Schneider (3)	(Switzerland) Vreni Schneider	(Switzerland) Brigitte Oertli (4)	--
1988	(Switzerland) Michela Figini (2)	(Switzerland) Michela Figini (3)	(Switzerland) Michela Figini	(Socialist Federal Republic of Yugoslavia) Mateja Svet	(Austria) Roswitha Steiner (2)	(Switzerland) Brigitte Oertli (3)	--
1987	(Switzerland) Maria Walliser (2)	(Switzerland) Michela Figini (2)	(Switzerland) Maria Walliser	(Switzerland) Vreni Schneider (2) (Switzerland) Maria Walliser	(Switzerland) Corinne Schmidhauser	(Switzerland) Brigitte Oertli (2)	--
1986	(Switzerland) Maria Walliser	(Switzerland) Maria Walliser (2)	(West Germany) Marina Kiehl	(Switzerland) Vreni Schneider	(Austria) Roswitha Steiner	(Switzerland) Maria Walliser	--
1985	(Switzerland) Michela Figini	(Switzerland) Michela Figini	--	(West Germany) Marina Kiehl	(Switzerland) Erika Hess (4)	(Switzerland) Brigitte Oertli	--
1984	(Switzerland) Erika Hess (2)	(Switzerland) Maria Walliser	--	(Switzerland) Erika Hess	(United States) Tamara McKinney	(Switzerland) Erika Hess	--
1983	(United States) Tamara McKinney	(Switzerland) Doris de Agostini	--	(United States) Tamara McKinney (2)	(Switzerland) Erika Hess (3)	(Liechtenstein) Hanni Wenzel (3)	--
1982	(Switzerland) Erika Hess	(France) Marie-Cécile Gros-Gaudenier	--	(West Germany) Irene Epple	(Switzerland) Erika Hess (2)	(West Germany) Irene Epple	--
1981	(Switzerland) Marie-Theres Nadig	(Switzerland) Marie-Theres Nadig (2)	--	(United States) Tamara McKinney	(Switzerland) Erika Hess	(Switzerland) Marie-Theres Nadig	--
1980	(Liechtenstein) Hanni Wenzel (2)	(Switzerland) Marie-Theres Nadig	--	(Liechtenstein) Hanni Wenzel (2)	(France) Perrine Pelen	(Liechtenstein) Hanni Wenzel (2)	--
1979	(Austria) Annemarie Moser-Pröll (6)	(Austria) Annemarie Moser-Pröll (7)	--	(West Germany) Christa Kinshofer	(Austria) Regina Sackl	(Austria) Annemarie Moser-Pröll (2)	--
1978	(Liechtenstein) Hanni Wenzel	(Austria) Annemarie Moser-Pröll (6)	--	(Switzerland) Lise-Marie Morerod (3)	(Liechtenstein) Hanni Wenzel	--	--
1977	(Switzerland) Lise-Marie Morerod	(Austria) Brigitte Totschnig (2)	--	(Switzerland) Lise-Marie Morerod (2)	(Switzerland) Lise-Marie Morerod (2)	(Liechtenstein) Hanni Wenzel	--
1976	(West Germany) Rosi Mittermaier	(Austria) Brigitte Totschnig	--	(Switzerland) Lise-Marie Morerod	(West Germany) Rosi Mittermaier	(West Germany) Rosi Mittermaier	--
1975	(Austria) Annemarie Moser-Pröll (5)	(Austria) Annemarie Moser-Pröll (5)	--	(Austria) Annemarie Moser-Pröll (3)	(Switzerland) Lise-Marie Morerod	(Austria) Annemarie Moser-Pröll	--
1974	(Austria) Annemarie Pröll (4)	(Austria) Annemarie Pröll (4)	--	(Liechtenstein) Hanni Wenzel	(West Germany) Christa Zechmeister	--	--
1973	(Austria) Annemarie Pröll (3)	(Austria) Annemarie Pröll (3)	--	(Austria) Monika Kaserer	(France) Patricia Emonet	--	--
1972	(Austria) Annemarie Pröll (2)	(Austria) Annemarie Pröll (2)	--	(Austria) Annemarie Pröll (2)	(France) Britt Lafforgue (2)	--	--
1971	(Austria) Annemarie Pröll	(Austria) Annemarie Pröll	--	(Austria) Annemarie Pröll	(France) Britt Lafforgue (Canada) Betsy Clifford	--	--
1970	(France) Michèle Jacot	(France) Isabelle Mir (2)	--	(France) Michèle Jacot (France) Françoise Macchi	(France) Ingrid Lafforgue	--	--
1969	(Austria) Gertrud Gabl	(Austria) Wiltrud Drexel	--	(United States) Marilyn Cochran	(Austria) Gertrud Gabl	--	--
1968	(Canada) Nancy Greene (2)	(France) Isabelle Mir (Austria) Olga Pall	--	(Canada) Nancy Greene (2)	(France) Marielle Goitschel (2)	--	--
1967	(Canada) Nancy Greene	(France) Marielle Goitschel	--	(Canada) Nancy Greene	(France) Marielle Goitschel (France) Annie Famose	--	--

== Milestones ==
- First to win 10 races in one event: Annemarie Moser-Pröll (downhill)
- First to win 20 races in one event: Annemarie Moser-Pröll (downhill)
- First to win 30 races in one event: Annemarie Moser-Pröll (downhill)
- First to win 40 races in one event: Lindsey Vonn (downhill)
- First to win 50 races in one event: Mikaela Shiffrin (slalom)
- First to win 60 races in one event: Mikaela Shiffrin (slalom)
- First to win 70 races in one event: Mikaela Shiffrin (slalom)
- First to win 10 races in two events: Annemarie Moser-Pröll (downhill and giant slalom)
- First to win 20 races in two events: Vreni Schneider (slalom and giant slalom)
- First to win races in three events: Nancy Greene (downhill, slalom and giant slalom)
- First to win races in four events: Annemarie Moser-Pröll (downhill, slalom, giant slalom and combined)
- First to win races in five events: Petra Kronberger (downhill, super G, slalom, giant slalom and combined)
- First to win races in six events: Mikaela Shiffrin (downhill, super G, slalom, giant slalom, combined and parallel slalom)
- First to win races in seven events: Mikaela Shiffrin (downhill, super G, slalom, giant slalom, combined, parallel slalom and city event)
- First to win 10 races in three events: Lara Gut-Behrami (downhill, super G and giant slalom)
- First to win 4 races in four events: Anja Parson, then Mikaela Shiffrin (downhill, super G, slalom, GS)
- First to win 9 races in one event in one season (2025-2026): Mikaela Shiffrin (slalom)
- First to win 90 World Cup races: Mikaela Shiffrin
- First to win 100 World Cup races: Mikaela Shiffrin
- First to win 110 World Cup races: Mikaela Shiffrin
- First to score 9 times more than 1.000 points in the World Cup: Mikaela Shiffrin (average score 1.650 points)
- First to score 3 times more than 2.000 points in the World Cup: Mikaela Shiffrin
- First to have a career average more than 1.000 points in the World Cup: Mikaela Shiffrin (average score 1.050)

== See also ==
- List of FIS Alpine Ski World Cup men's champions
- List of alpine skiing world champions
