= Henri Bréchu =

French alpine skier (born 1947)

Henri Bréchu (born 1 December 1947 in Gap, Hautes-Alpes) is a retired French alpine skier. He finished 11th overall in the 1969–70 FIS Alpine Ski World Cup.
