= Giant slalom =

Alpine skiing and alpine snowboarding discipline

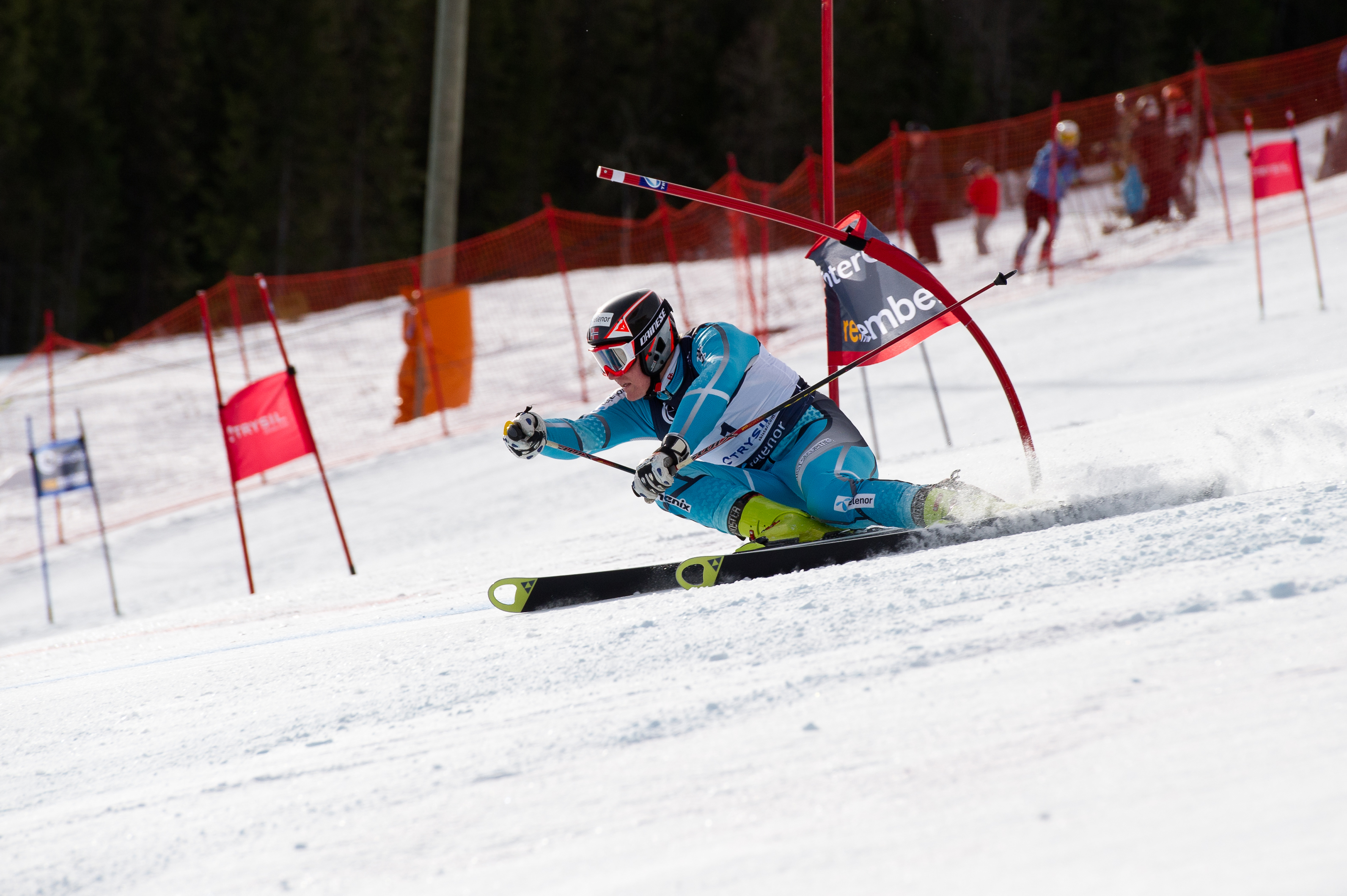
A skier attacks a gate in GS

Giant slalom (GS) is an alpine skiing and alpine snowboarding competitive discipline. It involves racing between sets of poles ("gates") spaced at a greater distance from each other than in slalom, but less than in Super-G.

Giant slalom and slalom make up the technical events in alpine ski racing. This category separates them from the speed events of Super-G and downhill. The technical events are normally composed of two runs, held on different courses on the same ski run.

== Course ==
The vertical drop for a GS course must be 250–450 m (820–1,480 ft) for men, and 250–400 m (820–1,310 ft) for women. The number of gates in this event is 56–70 for men and 46–58 for women. The number of direction changes in a GS course equals 11–15% of the vertical drop of the course in metres, 13–18% for children. As an example, a course with a vertical drop of 300 m (984 ft) would have 33–45 direction changes for an adult race.

== Speed ==
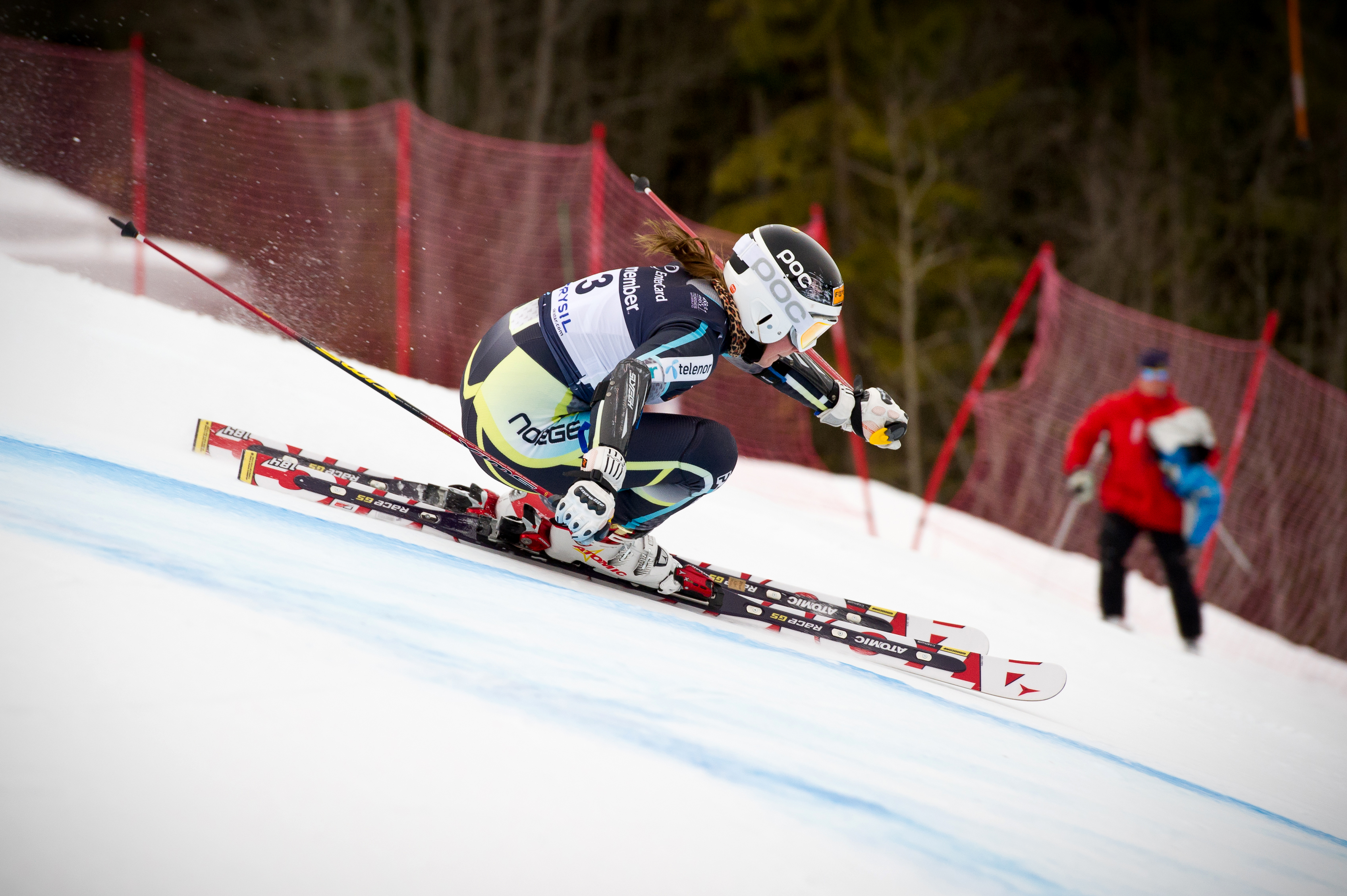
Olympian Lotte Smiseth Sejersted in a GS race

Although giant slalom is not the fastest event in skiing, on average a well-trained racer may reach average speeds of 80 km/h (50 mph).

== Equipment ==
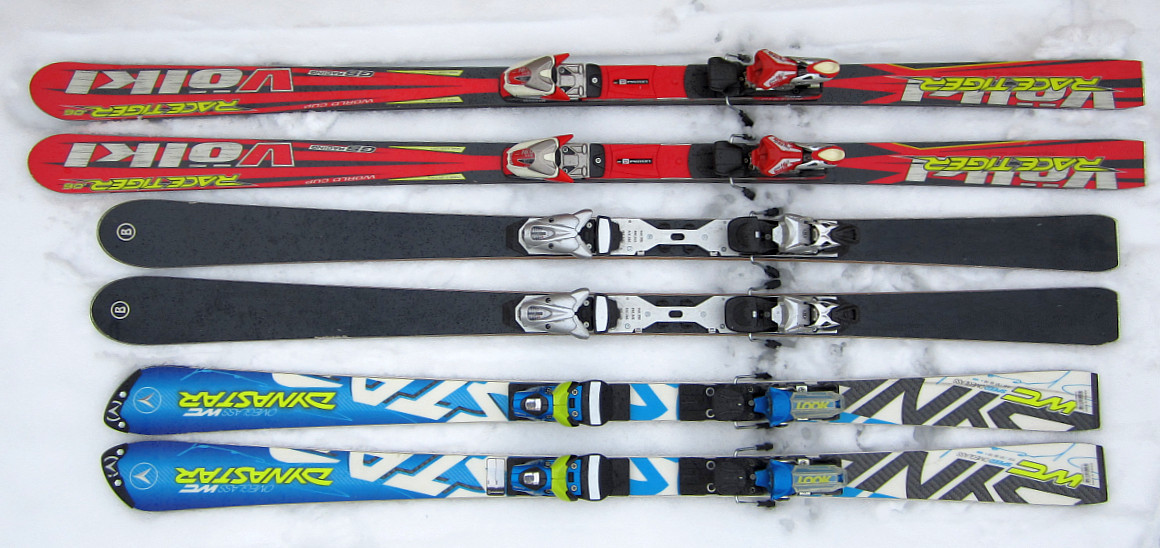
Top: giant slalom skis from 2006, bottom: slalom skis.

Giant slalom skis are shorter than super-G and downhill skis, and longer than slalom skis.

In an attempt to increase safety for the 2003–2004 season, the International Ski and Snowboard Federation (FIS) increased its minimum sidecut radius for giant slalom skis to 21 m (69 ft) and for the first time imposed minimum ski lengths for GS: 185 cm (72.8 in) for men and 180 cm (70.9 in) for women. A maximum stand height (the distance from the snow to the sole of the boot) of 55 mm (2.17 in) was also established for all disciplines.

In May 2006, the FIS announced further changes to the rules governing equipment. Beginning with the 2007–2008 season, the minimum radius for GS skis was increased to 27 m (89 ft) for men and 23 m (75 ft) for women. Additionally, the minimum ski width at the waist was increased from 60 to 65 mm (2.36 to 2.56 in), and the maximum stand height for all disciplines was reduced to 50 mm (1.97 in). The best skiers tended to use a bigger sidecut radius, like Ted Ligety at 29 m (95 ft), and Lindsey Vonn at 27 m (89 ft).

For the 2012–2013 season, the FIS increased the sidecut radius to 35 m (115 ft) and the minimum length to 195 cm (76.8 in). Many athletes criticized this decision. Often David Dodge was cited. Dodge argues that FIS used studies that do not represent a scientific proof. He states that it is well known that if one tips the ski 7° more the 35 m ski, will have the same turning radius as the 28 m ski. He states as well that knee injuries are decreasing since the 1990s, when carving skis started to be used.

According to the FIS Specification for Alpine Competition Equipment for the 2024–2025 season, the specifications for FIS World Cup GS skis are as follows: The minimum sidecut radius is 30 m (98 ft) for both men and women, and the minimum ski lengths are 188 cm (74 in) for women and 193 cm (75.9 in) for men.

== History ==
The first giant slalom was set in 1935 on the Mottarone in Italy, over Lake Maggiore, near Stresa, on January 20. After one month, the second giant slalom was set on the Marmolada in Italy's Dolomite mountains, by Guenther Langes.

The giant slalom was added to the world championships in 1950 at Aspen, Colorado, and debuted at the Winter Olympics in 1952 at Oslo, Norway, run at Norefjell. The GS has been run in every world championships and Olympics since. Originally a one-run event, a second run was added for men at the world championships in 1966, run on consecutive days, and at the Olympics in 1968. The second run for women was added at the world championships in 1978, and made its Olympic debut in 1980.

The world championships changed to a one-day format for the giant slalom in 1974, but the Olympics continued the GS as a two-day event through 1980. Also scheduled for two days in 1984, both giant slaloms became one-day events after repeated postponements of the downhills. Following the extra races added to the program in 1988, the GS has been scheduled as a one-day event at the Olympics.

Upon its introduction, giant slalom briefly displaced the combined event at the world championships; the latter was absent in 1950 and 1952. The combined returned in 1954 in Åre, Sweden, but as a "paper race," using the results of the three events (downhill, giant slalom, and slalom), a format used through 1980. The combined returned as a stand-alone event at the world championships in 1982 at Schladming, Austria, and at the 1988 Calgary Olympics. It was changed to the super-combined format (one run of slalom on same day as downhill) at the world championships in 2007 and the Olympics in 2010.

The greatest giant slalom specialist of all time was Ingemar Stenmark, with 46 World Cup victories (between 1975 and 1989).

== Men's World Cup podiums ==
In the following table men's giant slalom World Cup podiums from the World Cup first edition in 1967.

Season	1st	2nd	3rd
1967	(France) Jean-Claude Killy	(France) Georges Mauduit	(United States) Jimmie Heuga
1968	(France) Jean-Claude Killy	(Switzerland) Edmund Bruggmann	(Austria) Herbert Huber
1968-69	(Austria) Karl Schranz	(Austria) Reinhard Tritscher	(France) Jean-Noël Augert
1969-70	(Italy) Gustav Thöni	(Switzerland) Patrick Russel (France) Dumeng Giovanoli	
1970-71	(Italy) Gustav Thöni (France) Patrick Russel		(Switzerland) Edmund Bruggmann
1971-72	(Italy) Gustav Thöni	(Switzerland) Edmund Bruggmann	(France) Roger Rossat-Mignod
1972-73	(Austria) Hansi Hinterseer	(Norway) Erik Håker	(Switzerland) Adolf Rösti
1973-74	(Italy) Piero Gros	(Austria) Hansi Hinterseer	(Italy) Gustav Thöni
1974-75	(Sweden) Ingemar Stenmark	(Italy) Piero Gros	(Norway) Erik Håker
1975-76	(Sweden) Ingemar Stenmark	(Italy) Gustav Thöni	(Italy) Piero Gros
1976-77	(Sweden) Ingemar Stenmark (Switzerland) Heini Hemmi		(Austria) Klaus Heidegger
1977-78	(Sweden) Ingemar Stenmark	(Liechtenstein) Andreas Wenzel	(United States) Phil Mahre
1978-79	(Sweden) Ingemar Stenmark	(Switzerland) Peter Lüscher	(Socialist Federal Republic of Yugoslavia) Bojan Križaj
1979-80	(Sweden) Ingemar Stenmark	(Austria) Hans Enn	(Switzerland) Jacques Lüthy
1980-81	(Sweden) Ingemar Stenmark	(Soviet Union) Alexander Zhirov	(United States) Phil Mahre
1981-82	(United States) Phil Mahre	(Sweden) Ingemar Stenmark	(Luxembourg) Marc Girardelli
1982-83	(United States) Phil Mahre	(Sweden) Ingemar Stenmark (Switzerland) Max Julen	
1983-84	(Sweden) Ingemar Stenmark (Switzerland) Pirmin Zurbriggen		(Austria) Hans Enn
1984-85	(Luxembourg) Marc Girardelli	(Switzerland) Pirmin Zurbriggen	(Switzerland) Thomas Bürgler
1985-86	(Switzerland) Joël Gaspoz	(Sweden) Ingemar Stenmark	(Austria) Hubert Strolz
1986-87	(Switzerland) Pirmin Zurbriggen (Switzerland) Joël Gaspoz		(Italy) Richard Pramotton
1987-88	(Italy) Alberto Tomba	(Austria) Hubert Strolz	(Austria) Helmut Mayer
1988-89	(Norway) Ole Kristian Furuseth (Switzerland) Pirmin Zurbriggen		(Austria) Rudolf Nierlich
1989-90	(Austria) Günther Mader (Norway) Ole Kristian Furuseth		(Austria) Hubert Strolz
1990-91	(Italy) Alberto Tomba	(Austria) Rudolf Nierlich	(Luxembourg) Marc Girardelli
1991-92	(Italy) Alberto Tomba	(Switzerland) Hans Pieren	(Switzerland) Paul Accola
1992-93	(Norway) Kjetil Aamodt	(Italy) Alberto Tomba	(Luxembourg) Marc Girardelli
1993-94	(Austria) Christian Mayer	(Norway) Kjetil Aamodt	(France) Franck Piccard
1994-95	(Italy) Alberto Tomba	(Slovenia) Jure Košir	(Norway) Harald Strand Nilsen
1995-96	(Switzerland) Michael von Grünigen	(Switzerland) Urs Kälin	(Norway) Lasse Kjus
1996-97	(Switzerland) Michael von Grünigen	(Norway) Kjetil Aamodt	(Austria) Hans Knauß
1997-98	(Austria) Hermann Maier	(Switzerland) Michael von Grünigen	(Austria) Christian Mayer
1998-99	(Switzerland) Michael von Grünigen	(Austria) Stephan Eberharter	(Austria) Hermann Maier
1999-2000	(Austria) Hermann Maier	(Austria) Christian Mayer	(Switzerland) Michael von Grünigen
2000-01	(Austria) Hermann Maier	(Switzerland) Michael von Grünigen	(United States) Erik Schlopy
2001-02	(France) Frédéric Covili	(Austria) Benjamin Raich	(Austria) Stephan Eberharter
2002-03	(Switzerland) Michael von Grünigen	(United States) Bode Miller	(Austria) Hans Knauß
2003-04	(United States) Bode Miller	(Finland) Kalle Palander	(Italy) Massimiliano Blardone
2004-05	(Austria) Benjamin Raich	(United States) Bode Miller	(Canada) Thomas Grandi
2005-06	(Austria) Benjamin Raich	(Italy) Massimiliano Blardone	(Sweden) Fredrik Nyberg
2006-07	(Norway) Aksel Lund Svindal	(Italy) Massimiliano Blardone	(Austria) Benjamin Raich
2007-08	(United States) Ted Ligety	(Austria) Benjamin Raich	(Italy) Manfred Mölgg
2008-09	(Switzerland) Didier Cuche	(Austria) Benjamin Raich	(United States) Ted Ligety
2009-10	(United States) Ted Ligety	(Switzerland) Carlo Janka	(Austria) Benjamin Raich
2010-11	(United States) Ted Ligety	(Norway) Aksel Lund Svindal	(France) Cyprien Richard
2011-12	(Austria) Marcel Hirscher	(United States) Ted Ligety	(Italy) Massimiliano Blardone
2012-13	(United States) Ted Ligety	(Austria) Marcel Hirscher	(France) Alexis Pinturault
2013-14	(United States) Ted Ligety	(Austria) Marcel Hirscher	(France) Alexis Pinturault
2014-15	(Austria) Marcel Hirscher	(France) Alexis Pinturault	(United States) Ted Ligety
2015-16	(Austria) Marcel Hirscher	(France) Alexis Pinturault	(Norway) Henrik Kristoffersen
2016-17	(Austria) Marcel Hirscher	(France) Mathieu Faivre	(France) Alexis Pinturault
2017-18	(Austria) Marcel Hirscher	(Norway) Henrik Kristoffersen	(France) Alexis Pinturault
2018-19	(Austria) Marcel Hirscher	(Norway) Henrik Kristoffersen	(France) Alexis Pinturault
2019-20	(Norway) Henrik Kristoffersen	(France) Alexis Pinturault	(Croatia) Filip Zubčić
2020-21	(France) Alexis Pinturault	(Switzerland) Marco Odermatt	(Croatia) Filip Zubčić
2021-22	(Switzerland) Marco Odermatt	(Norway) Henrik Kristoffersen	(Austria) Manuel Feller
2022-23	(Switzerland) Marco Odermatt	(Norway) Henrik Kristoffersen	(Slovenia) Žan Kranjec
2023-24	(Switzerland) Marco Odermatt	(Switzerland) Loïc Meillard	(Croatia) Filip Zubčić
2024-25	(Switzerland) Marco Odermatt	(Norway) Henrik Kristoffersen	(Switzerland) Loïc Meillard

== Men's most podiums in World Cup ==
Racers with the most World Cup podiums in giant slalom.

#	Skier	Total	Last
1	(Sweden) Ingemar Stenmark	72	19-02-1989
2	(Austria) Marcel Hirscher	59	24-02-2019
3	(Switzerland) Michael von Grünigen	46	15-03-2003
4	(United States) Ted Ligety	41	28-01-2018
5	(France) Alexis Pinturault	41	12-03-2023
6	(Switzerland) Marco Odermatt	38	12-01-2025
7	(Austria) Benjamin Raich	35	01-03-2015
8	(Norway) Henrik Kristoffersen	33	27-10-2024
9	(Italy) Alberto Tomba	31	06-01-1998
10	(Austria) Hermann Maier	28	23-10-2005
11	(United States) Phil Mahre	26	05-03-1984
12	(Italy) Gustav Thöni	26	02-01-1977
13	(Luxembourg) Marc Girardelli	26	27-03-1993
14	(Italy) Massimiliano Blardone	25	13-02-2016
15	(United States) Bode Miller	21	08-12-2013

Still active
Totals through 02 March 2024

== Women's World Cup podiums ==
In the following table women's giant slalom World Cup podiums from the World Cup first edition in 1967.

Season	1st	2nd	3rd
1967	(Canada) Nancy Greene	(Austria) Erika Schinegger	(France) Annie Famose
1968	(Canada) Nancy Greene	(Switzerland) Fernande Bochatay	(France) Florence Steurer
1968-69	(United States) Marilyn Cochran	(France) Michèle Jacot	(Austria) Gertrud Gabl
1969-70	(France) Michèle Jacot (France) Françoise Macchi		(Austria) Annemarie Moser-Pröll
1970-71	(Austria) Annemarie Moser-Pröll	(France) Michèle Jacot	(France) Françoise Macchi
1971-72	(Austria) Annemarie Moser-Pröll	(Austria) Monika Kaserer	(France) Britt Lafforgue
1972-73	(Austria) Monika Kaserer	(Austria) Annemarie Moser-Pröll	(Liechtenstein) Hanni Wenzel
1973-74	(Liechtenstein) Hanni Wenzel	(France) Fabienne Serrat	(Austria) Monika Kaserer
1974-75	(Austria) Annemarie Moser-Pröll	(France) Fabienne Serrat	(Austria) Monika Kaserer
1975-76	(Switzerland) Lise-Marie Morerod	(Austria) Monika Kaserer	(Germany) Rosi Mittermaier
1976-77	(Switzerland) Lise-Marie Morerod	(Austria) Monika Kaserer	(Austria) Annemarie Moser-Pröll
1977-78	(Switzerland) Lise-Marie Morerod	(Liechtenstein) Hanni Wenzel	(Germany) Maria Epple
1978-79	(Germany) Christa Kinshofer	(Liechtenstein) Hanni Wenzel	(Germany) Irene Epple
1979-80	(Liechtenstein) Hanni Wenzel	(Switzerland) Marie-Thérèse Nadig (France) Perrine Pelen	
1980-81	(United States) Tamara McKinney	(Switzerland) Marie-Thérèse Nadig	(Germany) Irene Epple (Switzerland) Erika Hess (Liechtenstein) Hanni Wenzel
1981-82	(Germany) Irene Epple	(Germany) Maria Epple	(Switzerland) Erika Hess
1982-83	(United States) Tamara McKinney	(United States) Cindy Nelson	(Germany) Maria Epple
1983-84	(Switzerland) Erika Hess	(United States) Christin Cooper	(United States) Tamara McKinney
1984-85	(Switzerland) Michela Figini (Germany) Marina Kiehl		(Switzerland) Vreni Schneider
1985-86	(Switzerland) Vreni Schneider	(Germany) Traudl Hächer	(Socialist Federal Republic of Yugoslavia) Mateja Svet
1986-87	(Switzerland) Vreni Schneider (Switzerland) Maria Walliser		(Spain) Blanca Fernández Ochoa
1987-88	(Socialist Federal Republic of Yugoslavia) Mateja Svet	(France) Catherine Quittet	(Switzerland) Vreni Schneider
1988-89	(Switzerland) Vreni Schneider	(Socialist Federal Republic of Yugoslavia) Mateja Svet	(Switzerland) Maria Walliser
1989-90	(Austria) Anita Wachter	(Socialist Federal Republic of Yugoslavia) Mateja Svet	(Austria) Petra Kronberger
1990-91	(Switzerland) Vreni Schneider	(Austria) Anita Wachter	(Sweden) Pernilla Wiberg
1991-92	(France) Carole Merle	(Switzerland) Vreni Schneider	(United States) Diann Roffe
1992-93	(France) Carole Merle	(Austria) Anita Wachter	(Germany) Martina Ertl
1993-94	(Austria) Anita Wachter	(Switzerland) Vreni Schneider	(Italy) Deborah Compagnoni
1994-95	(Switzerland) Vreni Schneider	(Switzerland) Heidi Zeller-Bähler	(Slovenia) Špela Pretnar
1995-96	(Germany) Martina Ertl	(Germany) Katja Seizinger	(Austria) Anita Wachter
1996-97	(Italy) Deborah Compagnoni	(Germany) Katja Seizinger	(Austria) Anita Wachter
1997-98	(Germany) Martina Ertl	(Italy) Deborah Compagnoni	(Austria) Alexandra Meissnitzer
1998-99	(Austria) Alexandra Meissnitzer	(Austria) Anita Wachter	(Norway) Andrine Flemmen
1999-2000	(Austria) Michaela Dorfmeister	(Switzerland) Sonja Nef	(Austria) Anita Wachter
2000-01	(Switzerland) Sonja Nef	(Sweden) Anja Pärson	(Austria) Michaela Dorfmeister
2001-02	(Switzerland) Sonja Nef	(Austria) Michaela Dorfmeister	(Sweden) Anja Pärson
2002-03	(Sweden) Anja Pärson	(Italy) Karen Putzer	(Croatia) Janica Kostelić
2003-04	(Sweden) Anja Pärson	(Italy) Denise Karbon	(Spain) María José Rienda
2004-05	(Finland) Tanja Poutiainen	(Sweden) Anja Pärson	(Spain) María José Rienda
2005-06	(Sweden) Anja Pärson	(Spain) María José Rienda	(Croatia) Janica Kostelić
2006-07	(Austria) Nicole Hosp	(Finland) Tanja Poutiainen	(Austria) Michaela Kirchgasser
2007-08	(Italy) Denise Karbon	(Austria) Elisabeth Görgl	(Italy) Manuela Mölgg
2008-09	(Finland) Tanja Poutiainen	(Austria) Kathrin Zettel	(Slovenia) Tina Maze
2009-10	(Germany) Kathrin Hölzl	(Austria) Kathrin Zettel	(Slovenia) Tina Maze
2010-11	(Germany) Viktoria Rebensburg	(France) Tessa Worley	(Finland) Tanja Poutiainen
2011-12	(Germany) Viktoria Rebensburg	(United States) Lindsey Vonn	(France) Tessa Worley
2012-13	(Slovenia) Tina Maze	(Austria) Anna Fenninger	(Germany) Viktoria Rebensburg
2013-14	(Austria) Anna Fenninger	(Sweden) Jessica Lindell-Vikarby	(Sweden) Maria Pietilä Holmner
2014-15	(Austria) Anna Fenninger	(Austria) Eva-Maria Brem	(United States) Mikaela Shiffrin
2015-16	(Austria) Eva-Maria Brem	(Germany) Viktoria Rebensburg	(Switzerland) Lara Gut-Behrami
2016-17	(France) Tessa Worley	(United States) Mikaela Shiffrin	(Italy) Sofia Goggia
2017-18	(Germany) Viktoria Rebensburg	(France) Tessa Worley	(United States) Mikaela Shiffrin
2018-19	(United States) Mikaela Shiffrin	(Slovakia) Petra Vlhová	(France) Tessa Worley
2019-20	(Italy) Federica Brignone	(Slovakia) Petra Vlhová	(United States) Mikaela Shiffrin
2020-21	(Italy) Marta Bassino	(United States) Mikaela Shiffrin	(France) Tessa Worley
2021-22	(France) Tessa Worley	(Sweden) Sara Hector	(United States) Mikaela Shiffrin
2022-23	(United States) Mikaela Shiffrin	(Switzerland) Lara Gut-Behrami	(Italy) Marta Bassino
2023-24	(Switzerland) Lara Gut-Behrami	(Italy) Federica Brignone	(Sweden) Sara Hector
2024-25	(Italy) Federica Brignone	(New Zealand) Alice Robinson	(Sweden) Sara Hector

== See also ==
- List of Olympic medalists in men's giant slalom
- List of Olympic medalists in women's giant slalom
- List of Paralympic medalists in men's giant slalom
- List of Paralympic medalists in women's giant slalom
- List of alpine skiing world champions
