= Maria Roberta Schranz =

Italian alpine skier

- in Val Gardena in 1970

Personal information
- Born: 22 December 1952 (age 73) Domodossola, Italy

Skiing career
- Sport: Alpine skiing
- Retired: 1972
- Disciplines: Technical events
- World Cup debut: 1968

World Cup
- Seasons: 5

Maria Roberta "Beba" Schranz (born 22 December 1952) is a former Italian alpine skier.

== Career ==
During her career she has achieved five results among the top 10 in the World Cup and participated for the Italy Alpine Ski Team at the FIS Alpine World Ski Championships 1970.

== World Cup results ==
Top 10

Date	Place	Discipline	Rank
03-01-1972	(West Germany) Oberstaufen	Giant Slalom	10
09-01-1971	(West Germany) Oberstaufen	Slalom	8
14-03-1970	(Norway) Voss	Slalom	10
15-03-1969	(Canada) Mont-Sainte-Anne	Slalom	10
01-03-1968	(Italy) Abetone	Slalom	10
