= Judy Crawford =

Canadian alpine skier (born 1951)

Personal information
- Born: Judith MacPherson Crawford-Rawley; December 22, 1951 (age 74) Toronto, Ontario, Canada
- Height: 5 ft 5 in (165 cm)

Skiing career
- Sport: Alpine skiing
- Club: Georgian Peaks Ski Club
- Retired: 1974
- Disciplines: Downhill, Slalom, Giant Slalom
- World Cup debut: January 25, 1969 (St. Gervais, France)

Olympics
- Teams: 1

World Championships
- Teams: 5

World Cup
- Podiums: 1
Medal record
Women's alpine skiing
Representing Canada
World Cup
Bronze medal – third place	1973 Grindelwald	Slalom

Judith MacPherson Crawford-Rawley (born December 22, 1951) is a Canadian former alpine skier, who competed at the 1972 Winter Olympics in Sapporo, Japan, placing fourth in women's slalom.

Crawford made her World Cup debut in 1969 placing sixth in the downhill at Saint Gervais, France with a time of 1:55.96. She competed in World Cup events from 1969 to 1974 garnering 23 top ten finishes including third place in 1973 in the slalom at Grindelwald, Switzerland.

Crawford was inducted into the Canadian Ski Hall of Fame in 1995.

She is the aunt of Jack Crawford, winner of the bronze medal in the men's combined event at the 22 Beijing Winter Olympic Games.
