= Judy Nagel =

American alpine skier

Personal information
- Full name: Judy Ann Nagel
- Born: August 27, 1951 (age 74) Seattle, Washington, U.S.
- Height: 5 ft 4 in (1.63 m)

Skiing career
- Sport: Alpine skiing
- Club: Crystal Mountain Alpine
- Retired: April 1970 (age 18)
- Disciplines: Giant slalom, slalom, Downhill, combined
- World Cup debut: January 1968 (age 16)

Olympics
- Teams: 1 – (1968)
- Medals: 0

World Championships
- Teams: 2 – (1968, 1970)
- Medals: 0

World Cup
- Seasons: 3 – (1968–70)
- Wins: 3 – (2 SL, 1 GS
- Podiums: 12 – (8 SL, 4 GS
- Overall titles: 0 – (6th in 1970)
- Discipline titles: 0 – (4th: SL ('69), GS ('70))
Medal record
Women's alpine skiing
Representing the United States
U.S. Alpine Championships
Gold medal – first place	1968 Crystal Mountain	Slalom
Gold medal – first place	1968 Crystal Mountain	Combined

Judy Ann Nagel became Judy Nagel Johnson (born August 27, 1951) is a former World Cup alpine ski racer from the United States.

== Early years ==
Born in Seattle, Washington, Nagel was the younger of two daughters of an Olympic ski racer. She learned to ski and race at Stevens Pass when the family lived in Skykomish. When Crystal Mountain began operations in 1962, her father headed the new ski school and race program, and the family relocated to Enumclaw.

Her father, Jack Nagel (1926–2004), was a member of the U.S. alpine team at the 1952 Winter Olympics; he fell in the first run of the slalom and finished 29th in the giant slalom. Born in Port Townsend and raised in Skykomish, Jack was a third-generation logger when skiing was gaining popularity in the 1940s. He later ran the only gas station in Skykomish and was a ski instructor at Stevens Pass until 1962, when the new Crystal Mountain opened near Mount Rainier. His racing school was featured in Sports Illustrated in 1963, with older daughter Cathy, 14, on the cover.

== Racing career ==
Nagel competed in the 1968 Winter Olympics at age 16. Not originally on the World Cup or Olympic teams, Nagel and 18-year-old Kiki Cutter of Oregon were brought over to Europe a few weeks ahead of the Olympics to compete for berths on the U.S. Olympic team, which they both made. Nagel placed eighth and sixth in the two World Cup slaloms immediately preceding the Olympics, and led the Olympic slalom at Chamrousse by eight-hundredths of a second after the first run. U.S. racers seemingly held four of the first six spots after the first run, but the other three Americans were subsequently disqualified for missed gates. With the fastest run that qualified, Nagel was last out of the gate in the second run and missed an early gate. She climbed back up the hill to make the gate, then straddled another and had another spill to cross the finish line well back and was disqualified. Two days later, Nagel was the top U.S. finisher in the giant slalom at 12th place.

Back at her home mountain for the U.S. Alpine Championships, she won the slalom and combined at Crystal Mountain. A few weeks later Nagel gained her first World Cup podium at Heavenly Valley. She finished her first World Cup season eleventh overall, tenth in slalom, and ninth in giant slalom.

In the 1969 season, Nagel gained her first World Cup victory at age 17 (& 5½ months), and remains the youngest-ever American to win an alpine World Cup race. In that first win in Italy, her older sister Cathy was the runner-up. Her other wins were a sweep of the technical events in Lienz, Austria. Nagel's final World Cup race was in March 1970 at age 18; she retired from the circuit later that year to coach and pursue other interests. During her brief World Cup career, she won three races, attained twelve podiums, and had 29 top ten finishes.

In 2016 she was inducted into the North-West Ski Hall of Fame. The others honoured were Shannon Bloedel, Nobi Kano and Lenore Lyle.

== World Cup results ==
=== Season standings ===
Season	Age	Overall	Slalom	Giant slalom	Downhill
1968	16	11	10	9	—
1969	17	10	4	13	19
1970	18	6	7	4	11

=== Race podiums ===
- 3 wins - (2 slalom, 1 giant slalom)
- 12 podiums - (8 slalom, 4 giant slalom)

Season	Date	Location	Discipline	Place
1968	6 Apr 1968	(United States) Heavenly Valley, USA	Slalom	3rd
1969	4 Jan 1969	Oberstaufen, West Germany	Slalom	2nd
1969	23 Jan 1969	St. Gervais, France	Slalom	3rd
1969	8 Feb 1969	Sterzing, Italy	Slalom	1st
1969	28 Feb 1969	(United States) Squaw Valley, USA	Slalom	3rd
1969	22 Mar 1969	(United States) Waterville Valley, USA	Slalom	3rd
1970	19 Dec 1969	Lienz, Austria	Giant slalom	1st
1970	20 Dec 1969	Lienz, Austria	Slalom	1st
1970	24 Jan 1970	St. Gervais, France	Giant slalom	3rd
1970	1 Feb 1970	Abetone, Italy	Giant slalom	3rd
1970	2 Feb 1970	Abetone, Italy	Slalom	2nd
1970	27 Feb 1970	Vancouver, Canada	Giant slalom	3rd

== Olympic results ==
Year	Age	Slalom	Giant slalom	Super-G	Downhill	Combined
1968	16	DQ2 ^	12	not run	—	not run

^ Leader after first run of slalom

- From 1948 through 1980, the Winter Olympics were also the World Championships for alpine skiing.
