= Bernadette Rauter =

Austrian alpine skier (born 1949)

Bernadette Rauter (born 8 August 1949 in Breitenwang) is an Austrian former alpine skier who competed in the 1968 Winter Olympics and 1972 Winter Olympics.
