= Annerösli Zryd =

Swiss alpine skier (born 1949)

Medal record

Representing Switzerland

Women's Alpine skiing

World Championships
| Gold medal – first place | 1970 Val Gardena | Downhill |

Annerösli Zryd (born 3 May 1949 in Adelboden, Canton of Bern) is a Swiss alpine skier and world champion. She competed in three events at the 1968 Winter Olympics.

Zryd won a gold medal at the 1970 World Championships in Val Gardena, winning the Downhill event.
