= Betsy Clifford =

Canadian alpine skier (born 1953)

Personal information
- Full name: Elizabeth Clifford
- Born: October 15, 1953 (age 72) Ottawa, Ontario, Canada

Sport
- Sport: Alpine skiing
Medal record
Women's alpine skiing
Representing Canada
World Championships
Gold medal – first place	1970 Val Gardena	Giant Slalom
Silver medal – second place	1974 St. Moritz	Downhill
- Updated on April 26, 2012

Elizabeth Clifford (born October 15, 1953) is a Canadian retired alpine skier.

At the 1968 Winter Olympics, she was the youngest Canadian skier ever to compete. She finished 7th at the 1970 Alpine Skiing World Cup and 10th at the 1971 Alpine Skiing World Cup. In 1971, she won the Alpine skiing World Cup in slalom skiing.

In 1970, she was inducted into Canada's Sports Hall of Fame. In 1971, she was inducted into the Canadian Olympic Hall of Fame.

== World Cup victories ==
=== Overall ===
Season	Discipline
1971	Slalom

=== Individual races ===
Date	Location	Race
February 14, 1970	(Italy) Val Gardena	Giant Slalom
December 16, 1970	(France) Val-d'Isère	Slalom
January 21, 1971	(Austria) Schruns	Slalom
