= Britt Lafforgue =

French alpine skier (born 1948)

Personal information
- National team: France
- Born: 5 November 1948 (age 77) Bagnères-de-Luchon, France
- Occupation: Alpine skier
- Height: 160 cm (5 ft 3 in)
- Weight: 50 kg (110 lb)

Britt Lafforgue (born 5 November 1948 in Bagnères-de-Luchon) is a French former alpine skier who competed in the 1972 Winter Olympics.
