= Wiltrud Drexel =

Austrian alpine skier (born 1950)

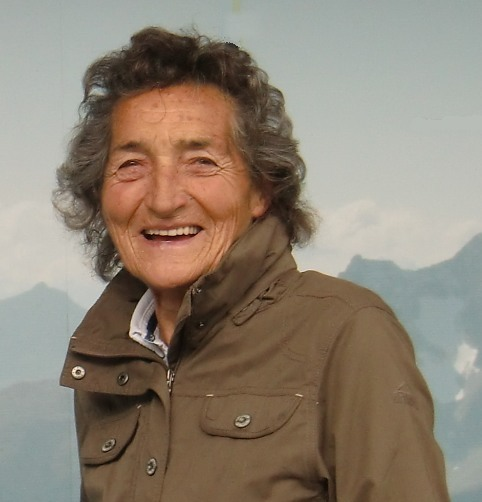
- Drexel in 2012

Personal information
- Born: 16 August 1950 (age 76) Feldkirch, Vorarlberg, Austria

Skiing career
- Sport: Alpine skiing
- Club: SC Warth
- Retired: 1978
Medal record
Women's alpine skiing
Representing Austria
Olympic Games
Bronze medal – third place	1972 Sapporo	Giant Slalom
World Championships
Bronze medal – third place	1974 St. Moritz	Downhill

Wiltrud Drexel (born 16 August 1950) is an Austrian former alpine skier and Olympic medalist. She received a bronze medal in the giant slalom at the 1972 Winter Olympics in Sapporo.
