= Ingrid Lafforgue =

French alpine skier (born 1948)

Medal record

Representing France

Women's Alpine skiing

World Championships
| Gold medal – first place | 1970 Val Gardena | Slalom |
| Silver medal – second place | 1970 Val Gardena | Giant Slalom |

Ingrid Lafforgue (born 5 November 1948 in Luchon) is a French alpine skier and world champion.

Lafforgue won a gold medal at the 1970 World Championships in Val Gardena, winning the slalom event.
