= Michèle Jacot =

French alpine skier (born 1952)

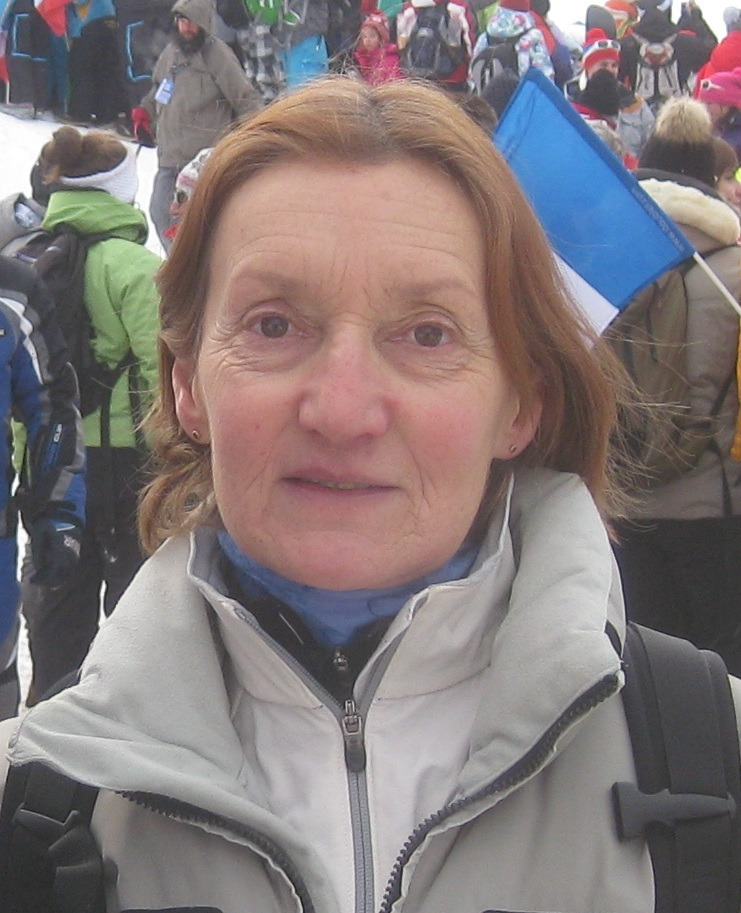
- Jacot in 2012

Medal record

Women's alpine skiing

Representing France

World Championships
Gold medal – first place	1970 Val Gardena	Combined
Silver medal – second place	1974 St. Moritz	Slalom

Michèle Jacot (French: [miʃɛl ʒako]; born 5 January 1952) is a French former alpine skier.

Born at Le Pont-de-Beauvoisin, she won the Alpine Skiing World Cup of the 1970 season and World Champion in the combined event (1970). As of 2011, she is the last and only French alpine skier to win the Women's Overall Alpine Skiing World Cup. She also competed at the 1972 Winter Olympics and the 1976 Winter Olympics.

== World Cup victories ==
=== Overall ===
Season	Discipline
1970	Overall
1970	Giant Slalom

=== Individual races ===
Date	Location	Race
9 February 1969	(Italy) Sterzing	Giant Slalom
14 March 1969	(Canada) Mont Sainte-Anne	Giant Slalom
12 December 1969	(France) Val-d'Isère	Slalom
4 January 1970	(West Germany) Oberstaufen	Giant Slalom
6 January 1970	(Switzerland) Grindelwald	Slalom
27 February 1970	(Canada) Vancouver	Giant Slalom
8 January 1971	(West Germany) Oberstaufen	Giant Slalom
9 January 1971	(West Germany) Oberstaufen	Slalom
20 January 1971	(Austria) Schruns	Downhill
20 February 1971	(United States) Sugarloaf	Giant Slalom
