= Françoise Macchi =

French alpine skier (born 1951)

Medal record

Women's Alpine Skiing

World Championships
Bronze medal – third place	1970 Val Gardena	Giant Slalom

Françoise Macchi (born 12 July 1951) is a French former alpine skier.

== Personal life ==
Macchi was born at Le Sentier, Switzerland. She married the fellow skier Jean-Noël Augert.

== World cup victories ==
Date	Location	Race
11 December 1968	(France) Val-d'Isère	Giant Slalom
10 December 1969	(France) Val-d'Isère	Giant Slalom
24 January 1970	(France) Saint-Gervais	Giant Slalom
30 January 1970	(West Germany) Garmisch-Partenkirchen	Downhill
12 December 1970	(Italy) Bardonecchia	Downhill
5 January 1971	(Slovenia) Maribor	Giant Slalom
18 December 1971	(Italy) Sestriere	Slalom
3 January 1972	(West Germany) Oberstaufen	Giant Slalom
4 January 1972	(West Germany) Oberstaufen	Slalom
7 January 1972	(Slovenia) Maribor	Giant Slalom
