= Alpine skiing at the 1968 Winter Olympics – Women's giant slalom =

Women's giant slalom at the X Olympic Winter Games
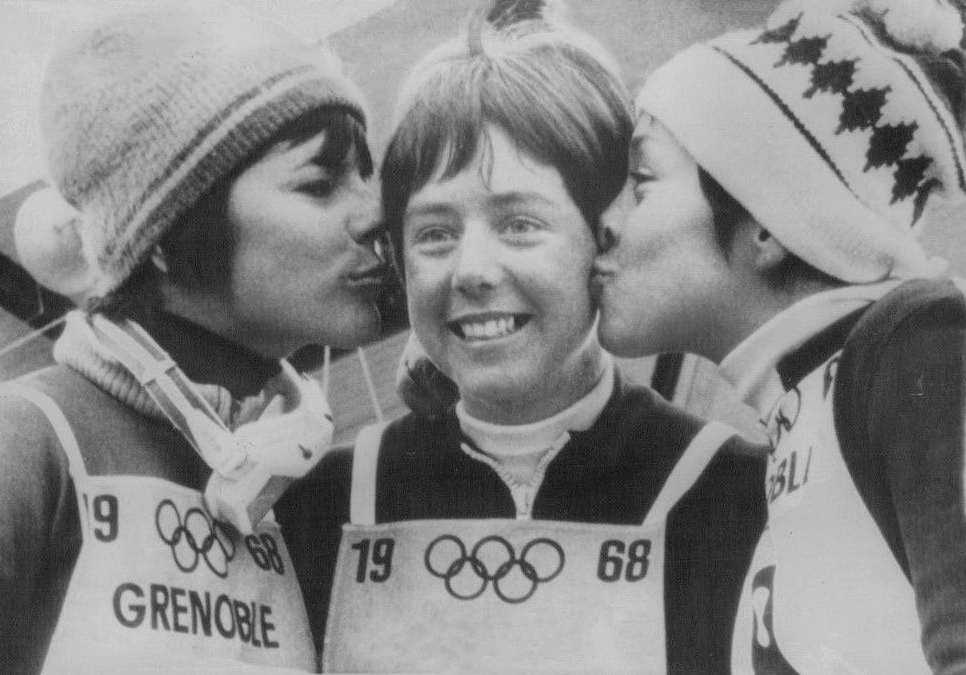
- Left-right:Famose, Greene, Bochatay
- Venue: Chamrousse
- Date: February 15, 1968
- Competitors: 47 from 18 nations
- Winning time: 1:51.97

Medalists
1st place, gold medalist(s)		Nancy Greene	Canada
2nd place, silver medalist(s)		Annie Famose	France
3rd place, bronze medalist(s)		Fernande Bochatay	Switzerland

Women's Giant Slalom
- Location: Chamrousse
- Vertical: 440 m (1,444 ft)
- Top elevation: 2,090 m (6,857 ft)
- Base elevation: 1,650 m (5,413 ft)

The Women's giant slalom competition of the Grenoble 1968 Olympics was held at Chamrousse.

The defending world champion was Marielle Goitschel of France, while Canada's Nancy Greene was the defending World Cup giant slalom champion, who also led the current season, along with Switzerland's Fernande Bochatay.

== Results ==
Rank	Name	Country	Time	Difference
1st place, gold medalist(s)	Nancy Greene	Canada	1:51.97	+0.00
2nd place, silver medalist(s)	Annie Famose	France	1:54.61	+2.64
3rd place, bronze medalist(s)	Fernande Bochatay	Switzerland	1:54.74	+2.77
4	Florence Steurer	France	1:54.75	+2.78
5	Olga Pall	Austria	1:55.61	+3.64
6	Isabelle Mir	France	1:56.07	+4.10
7	Marielle Goitschel	France	1:56.09	+4.12
8	Divina Galica	Great Britain	1:56.58	+4.61
9	Gertrud Gabl	Austria	1:56.85	+4.88
10	Burgl Färbinger	West Germany	1:57.20	+5.23
11	Brigitte Seiwald	Austria	1:57.26	+5.29
12	Judy Nagel	United States	1:57.39	+5.42
13	Annerösli Zryd	Switzerland	1:57.60	+5.63
14	Giustina Demetz	Italy	1:57.86	+5.89
15	Christine Laprell	West Germany	1:58.12	+6.15
16	Karen Dokka	Canada	1:58.36	+6.39
17	Suzy Chaffee	United States	1:58.38	+6.41
18	Margret Hafen	West Germany	1:58.47	+6.50
19	Vreni Inäbnit	Switzerland	1:58.50	+6.53
20	Rosi Mittermaier	West Germany	1:58.75	+6.78
21	Kiki Cutter	United States	1:59.52	+7.55
22	Wendy Allen	United States	2:00.03	+8.06
23	Glorianda Cipolla	Italy	2:00.07	+8.10
24	Felicity Field	Great Britain	2:00.55	+8.58
25	Judi Leinweber	Canada	2:00.57	+8.60
26	Gina Hathorn	Great Britain	2:00.80	+8.83
27	Lisi Pall	Austria	2:00.91	+8.94
28	Aud Hvammen	Norway	2:01.30	+9.33
29	Majda Ankele	Yugoslavia	2:02.44	+10.47
30	Helen Jamieson	Great Britain	2:02.99	+11.02
31	Lotte Nogler	Italy	2:04.87	+12.90
32	Clotilde Fasolis	Italy	2:05.20	+13.23
33	Marta Bühler	Liechtenstein	2:06.20	+14.23
34	Alfina Sukhanova	Soviet Union	2:06.48	+14.51
35	Ingrid Sundberg	Sweden	2:08.54	+16.57
36	Mihoko Otsue	Japan	2:10.56	+18.59
37	Irene Viaene	Argentina	2:11.68	+19.71
38	Helga María Sista	Argentina	2:11.75	+19.78
39	Galina Sidorova	Soviet Union	2:12.01	+20.04
40	Nina Merkulova	Soviet Union	2:12.71	+20.74
41	Verena Vogt	Chile	2:13.18	+21.21
42	Anne Reid	New Zealand	2:13.30	+21.33
–	Madeleine Wuilloud	Switzerland	DNF	–
–	Ana Sabine Naumann	Argentina	DNF	–
–	Anna Mohrová	Czechoslovakia	DQ	–
–	Betsy Clifford	Canada	DQ	–
–	Irina Turundayevskaya	Soviet Union	DQ	–
