= Alpine skiing at the 1968 Winter Olympics – Women's slalom =

Women's slalom at the X Olympic Winter Games
- Alpine skiing
- Venue: Chamrousse
- Date: February 13, 1968
- Competitors: 49 from 18 nations
- Winning time: 3:09.62

Medalists
1st place, gold medalist(s)		Marielle Goitschel	France
2nd place, silver medalist(s)		Nancy Greene	Canada
3rd place, bronze medalist(s)		Annie Famose	France

The Women's slalom competition of the Grenoble 1968 Olympics was held at Chamrousse.

The defending world champion was Annie Famose of France, who shared the World Cup slalom championship with countrywoman Marielle Goitschel, who was also the leader of the 1968 World Cup.

== Results ==
Rank	Name	Country	Run 1	Run 2	Total	Difference
1st place, gold medalist(s)	Marielle Goitschel	France	0:40.27	0:45.59	1:25.86	-
2nd place, silver medalist(s)	Nancy Greene	Canada	0:41.45	0:44.70	1:26.15	+0.29
3rd place, bronze medalist(s)	Annie Famose	France	0:42.21	0:45.68	1:27.89	+2.03
4	Gina Hathorn	Great Britain	0:41.84	0:46.08	1:27.92	+2.06
5	Isabelle Mir	France	0:42.14	0:46.08	1:28.22	+2.36
6	Burgl Färbinger	West Germany	0:42.70	0:46.20	1:28.90	+3.04
7	Glorianda Cipolla	Italy	0:43.15	0:46.59	1:29.74	+3.88
8	Bernadette Rauter	Austria	0:43.34	0:47.10	1:30.44	+4.58
9	Olga Pall	Austria	0:43.59	0:47.52	1:31.11	+5.25
10	Christine Laprell	West Germany	0:42.94	0:48.31	1:31.25	+5.39
11	Annerösli Zryd	Switzerland	0:42.97	0:48.44	1:31.41	+5.55
12	Majda Ankele	Yugoslavia	0:43.33	0:48.27	1:31.60	+5.74
13	Madeleine Wuilloud	Switzerland	0:44.86	0:48.41	1:33.27	+7.41
14	Felicity Field	Great Britain	0:44.41	0:48.97	1:33.38	+7.52
15	Karen Dokka	Canada	0:44.92	0:49.59	1:34.51	+8.65
16	Christl Hintermaier	West Germany	0:44.67	0:49.95	1:34.62	+8.76
17	Vreni Inäbnit	Switzerland	0:45.45	0:49.73	1:35.18	+9.32
18	Anna Mohrová	Czechoslovakia	0:46.23	0:49.73	1:35.96	+10.10
19	Irina Turundayevskaya	Soviet Union	0:46.60	0:51.66	1:38.26	+12.40
20	Lotte Nogler	Italy	0:46.03	0:52.30	1:38.33	+12.47
21	Ingrid Sundberg	Sweden	0:46.91	0:52.65	1:39.56	+13.70
22	Clotilde Fasolis	Italy	0:46.40	0:54.32	1:40.72	+14.86
23	Diana Tomkinson	Great Britain	0:48.31	0:52.62	1:40.93	+15.07
24	Brigitte Seiwald	Austria	0:41.52	0:59.77	1:41.29	+15.43
25	Alfina Sukhanova	Soviet Union	0:49.57	0:52.01	1:41.58	+15.72
26	Galina Sidorova	Soviet Union	0:49.63	0:53.26	1:42.89	+17.03
27	Helga María Sista	Argentina	0:51.98	0:57.18	1:49.16	+23.30
28	Marta Bühler	Liechtenstein	0:55.24	0:54.20	1:49.44	+23.58
29	Ana Sabine Naumann	Argentina	0:53.13	0:57.04	1:50.17	+24.31
30	Anne Reid	New Zealand	0:52.97	0:57.61	1:50.58	+24.72
31	Mihoko Otsue	Japan	0:46.78	1:04.59	1:51.37	+25.51
-	Judy Nagel	United States	0:40.19	DQ	-	-
-	Rosi Mittermaier	West Germany	0:42.90	DQ	-	-
-	Dikke Eger-Bergman	Norway	0:43.50	DNF	-	-
-	Nina Merkulova	Soviet Union	?	DQ	-	-
-	Giustina Demetz	Italy	?	DNF	-	-
-	Verena Vogt	Chile	?	DNF	-	-
-	Gertrud Gabl	Austria	DNF	-	-	-
-	Divina Galica	Great Britain	DNF	-	-	-
-	Betsy Clifford	Canada	DNF	-	-	-
-	Irene Viaene	Argentina	DNF	-	-	-
-	Florence Steurer	France	DQ	-	-	-
-	Wendy Allen	United States	DQ	-	-	-
-	Rosie Fortna	United States	DQ	-	-	-
-	Kiki Cutter	United States	DQ	-	-	-
-	Judi Leinweber	Canada	DQ	-	-	-
-	Aud Hvammen	Norway	DQ	-	-	-
-	Fernande Bochatay	Switzerland	DQ	-	-	-
-	Margot Blakely	New Zealand	DQ	-	-	-
