= 1968 Alpine Skiing World Cup – Women's slalom =

1968 Women's slalom World Cup
Previous: 1967	Next: 1969

Women's slalom World Cup 1967/1968

== Calendar ==
Round	Race No	Place	Country	Date	Winner	Second	Third
1	2	Oberstaufen	West Germany	January 6, 1968	(France) Marielle Goitschel	(Austria) Gertrude Gabl	(Canada) Nancy Greene
2	4	Grindelwald	Switzerland	January 11, 1968	(Austria) Gertrude Gabl	(France) Isabelle Mir	(France) Marielle Goitschel
3	6	Badgastein	Austria	January 18, 1968	(France) Florence Steurer	(France) Marielle Goitschel	(Austria) Gertrude Gabl
4	7	St. Gervais	France	January 25, 1968	(Switzerland) Fernande Bochatay	(France) Florence Steurer	(United States) Kiki Cutter
5	10	Grenoble	France	February 13, 1968	(France) Marielle Goitschel	(Canada) Nancy Greene	(France) Annie Famose
6	14	Oslo	Norway	February 25, 1968	(United States) Kiki Cutter	(France) Isabelle Mir	(United States) Wendy Allen
7	15	Abetone	Italy	March 1, 1968	(France) Florence Steurer	(France) Annie Famose	(France) Britt Lafforgue
8	18	Aspen	United States	March 16, 1968	(Canada) Nancy Greene	(Austria) Gertrude Gabl	(United States) Kiki Cutter
9	20	Rossland	Canada	March 28, 1968	(France) Marielle Goitschel	(Switzerland) Fernande Bochatay	(United States) Kiki Cutter
10	23	Heavenly Valley	United States	April 6, 1968	(Austria) Gertrude Gabl	(Canada) Nancy Greene	(United States) Judy Nagel

Note: Round 5/Race 10 was the Olympic event, which counts also for the World Cup. See also 1968 Winter Olympics and Alpine skiing at the 1968 Winter Olympics

== Final point standings ==
In women's slalom World Cup 1967/68 the best 3 results count. Deductions are given in brackets.

Place	Name	Country	Total points	Deduction	2 (Germany)	4 (Switzerland)	6 (Austria)	7 (France)	10 (France)	14 (Norway)	15 (Italy)	18 (United States)	20 (Canada)	23 (United States)
1	Marielle Goitschel	France	75	(46)	25	(15)	(20)	(11)	25	-	-	-	25	-
2	Florence Steurer	France	70	(2)	(2)	-	25	20	-	-	25	-	-	-
	Gertrude Gabl	Austria	70	(35)	20	25	(15)	-	-	-	-	(20)	-	25
4	Nancy Greene	Canada	65	(15)	(15)	-	-	-	20	-	-	25	-	20
5	Kiki Cutter	United States	55	(19)	-	(4)	-	15	-	25	-	15	(15)	-
6	Fernande Bochatay	Switzerland	51	(5)	-	(1)	(4)	25	-	-	-	6	20	-
7	Isabelle Mir	France	48	(20)	-	20	8	(4)	(8)	20	-	-	-	(8)
8	Annie Famose	France	43		8	-	-	-	15	-	20	-	-	-
9	Wendy Allen	United States	37	(28)	-	11	(6)	(8)	-	15	-	(3)	11	(11)
10	Judy Nagel	United States	25	(3)	-	-	(3)	6	-	-	-	4	-	15
11	Rosi Fortna	United States	19		-	8	11	-	-	-	-	-	-	-
12	Gina Hathorn	United Kingdom	18		4	3	-	-	11	-	-	-	-	-
	Burgl Färbinger	West Germany	18		11	-	-	1	6	-	-	-	-	-
	Christine Béranger	France	18		3	-	-	-	-	11	-	-	4	-
15	Rosi Mittermaier	West Germany	18	(1)	(1)	2	-	-	-	-	-	8	8	-
16	Britt Lafforgue	France	15		-	-	-	-	-	-	15	-	-	-
17	Brigitte Seiwald	Austria	12		6	6	-	-	-	-	-	-	-	-
18	Françoise Macchi	France	11		-	-	-	-	-	-	11	-	-	-
	Cathy Nagel	United States	11		-	-	-	-	-	-	-	11	-	-
20	Erica Skinger	United States	10		-	-	-	1	-	-	-	-	6	3
21	Karianne Christiansen	Norway	8		-	-	-	-	-	8	-	-	-	-
	Roselda Joux	Italy	8		-	-	-	-	-	-	8	-	-	-
23	M. Vogl	West Germany	6		-	-	-	-	-	6	-	-	-	-
	Christiane Ray	France	6		-	-	-	-	-	-	6	-	-	-
	Barbara Ann Cochran	United States	6		-	-	-	-	-	-	-	-	-	6
26	Glorianda Cipolla	Italy	5		-	-	-	-	4	-	-	1	-	-
27	V. Hubert	West Germany	4		-	-	-	-	-	4	-	-	-	-
	B. Newall	United Kingdom	4		-	-	-	-	-	-	4	-	-	-
	Sherry Blann	United States	4		-	-	-	-	-	-	-	-	-	4
30	Michèle Jacot	France	3		-	-	-	3	-	-	-	-	-	-
	Bernadette Rauter	Austria	3		-	-	-	-	3	-	-	-	-	-
	Anne Brusletto	Norway	3		-	-	-	-	-	3	-	-	-	-
	Jacqueline Rouvier	France	3		-	-	-	-	-	-	3	-	-	-
	Betsy Clifford	Canada	3		-	-	-	-	-	-	-	-	3	-
	Olga Pall	Austria	3		-	-	-	-	2	-	-	-	1	-
36	Robin Morning	United States	2		-	-	2	-	-	-	-	-	-	-
	Penny McCoy	United States	2		-	-	-	2	-	-	-	-	-	-
	Dietlinde Wurmer	West Germany	2		-	-	-	-	-	2	-	-	-	-
	Paola Strauss	Italy	2		-	-	-	-	-	-	2	-	-	-
	Marilyn Cochran	United States	2		-	-	-	-	-	-	-	2	-	-
	Ann Black	United States	2		-	-	-	-	-	-	-	-	2	-
	Karen Budge	United States	2		-	-	-	-	-	-	-	-	-	2
43	Christine Laprell	West Germany	1		-	-	-	-	1	-	-	-	-	-
	Suzy Chaffee	United States	1		-	-	-	-	-	1	-	-	-	-
	Maria Roberta Schranz	Italy	1		-	-	-	-	-	-	1	-	-	-
	Patty Boydstun	United States	1		-	-	-	-	-	-	-	-	-	1

== Women's slalom team results ==
All points were shown including individual deduction. bold indicate highest score - italics indicate race wins

Place	Country	Total points	2 (Germany)	4 (Switzerland)	6 (Austria)	7 (France)	10 (France)	14 (Norway)	15 (Italy)	18 (United States)	20 (Canada)	23 (United States)	Racers	Wins
1	France	360	38	35	53	38	48	31	**80**	-	29	8	10	5
2	United States	229	-	23	23	31	-	41	-	35	34	42	15	1
3	Austria	123	26	31	15	-	5	-	-	20	1	25	4	2
4	Canada	83	15	-	-	-	20	-	-	25	3	20	2	1
5	Switzerland	56	-	1	4	25	-	-	-	6	20	-	1	1
6	West Germany	50	12	2	-	1	7	12	-	8	8	-	6	0
7	United Kingdom	22	4	3	-	-	11	-	4	-	-	-	2	0
8	Italy	16	-	-	-	-	4	-	11	1	-	-	4	0
9	Norway	11	-	-	-	-	-	11	-	-	-	-	2	0

**Alpine skiing World Cup**
**Women**

Overall | Downhill | Giant slalom | **Slalom**

**1968**
