= 1968 Alpine Skiing World Cup – Women's overall =

1968 Women's overall World Cup
Previous: 1967	Next: 1969

Women's overall World Cup 1967/1968

== Final point standings ==
In women's overall World Cup 1967/68 the best three downhills, best three giant slaloms and best three slaloms count. Deductions are given in brackets.

Place	Name	Country	Total; Points	Total; Deduction	Downhill		Giant; Slalom		Slalom
1	Nancy Greene	Canada	191	(63)	51		75	(48)	65	(15)
2	Isabelle Mir	France	159	(30)	70		41	(10)	48	(20)
3	Florence Steurer	France	153	(21)	23		60	(19)	70	(2)
4	Marielle Goitschel	France	148	(52)	29	(6)	44		75	(46)
5	Fernande Bochatay	Switzerland	126	(23)	10		65	(18)	51	(5)
6	Annie Famose	France	123	(8)	48	(4)	32	(4)	43
7	Gertrude Gabl	Austria	121	(51)	0		51	(16)	70	(35)
8	Olga Pall	Austria	89		70		16		3
9	Kiki Cutter	United States	80	(21)	0		25	(2)	55	(19)
10	Christl Haas	Austria	55	(15)	55	(15)	0		0
11	Judy Nagel	United States	53	(7)	0		28	(4)	25	(3)
12	Divina Galica	United Kingdom	49	(4)	32	(2)	17	(2)	0
13	Rosi Mittermaier	West Germany	47	(1)	0		29		18	(1)
	Brigitte Seiwald	Austria	47		25		10		12
15	Wendy Allen	United States	41	(28)	0		4		37	(28)
16	Burgl Färbinger	West Germany	38		6		14		18
17	Gina Hathorn	United Kingdom	25		0		7		18
18	Françoise Macchi	France	22		11		0		11
19	Britt Lafforgue	France	21		6		0		15
20	Rosi Fortna	United States	19		0		0		19
	Christine Béranger	France	19		0		1		18
22	Annerösli Zryd	Switzerland	17		17		0		0
23	Bernadette Rauter	Austria	14		11		0		3
24	Erica Skinger	United States	13		3		0		10
25	Karen Budge	United States	12		10		0		2
26	Evi Untermoser	Austria	11		11		0		0
	Jacqueline Rouvier	France	11		8		0		3
	Cathy Nagel	United States	11		0		0		11
29	Marie France Jean-Georges	France	9		9		0		0
30	Judy Leinweber	Canada	8		0		8		0
	Karianne Christiansen	Norway	8		0		0		8
	Dietlinde Wurmer	West Germany	8		0		6		2
	Roselda Joux	Italy	8		0		0		8
	Vreni Inäbnit	Switzerland	8		8		0		0
35	Michèle Jacot	France	7		4		0		3
	Suzy Chaffee	United States	7		3		3		1
37	Felicity Field	United Kingdom	6		6		0		0
	M. Vogl	West Germany	6		0		0		6
	Christiane Ray	France	6		0		0		6
	Paola Strauss	Italy	6		4		0		2
	Wiltrud Drexel	Austria	6		5		1		0
	Barbara Ann Cochran	United States	6		0		0		6
43	Glorianda Cipolla	Italy	5		0		0		5
	Marilyn Cochran	United States	5		0		3		2
	Betsy Clifford	Canada	5		0		2		3
46	V. Hubert	West Germany	4		0		0		4
	B. Newall	United Kingdom	4		0		0		4
	Sherry Blann	United States	4		0		0		4
49	Robin Morning	United States	3		0		1		2
	Penny McCoy	United States	3		0		1		2
	Anne Brusletto	Norway	3		0		0		3
	Marie-Cécile Mercier	France	3		3		0		0
53	Elizabeth Pall	Austria	2		2		0		0
	Giovanna Tiezza	Italy	2		2		0		0
	Ann Black	United States	2		0		0		2
56	Christine Laprell	West Germany	1		0		0		1
	Maria Roberta Schranz	Italy	1		0		0		1
	K. Buhler	Switzerland	1		1		0		0
	Patty Boydstun	United States	1		0		0		1

Alpine skiing World Cup
Women

Overall | Downhill | Giant slalom | Slalom

1968
