= 1968 Alpine Skiing World Cup – Women's downhill =

1968 Women's downhill World Cup
Previous: 1967	Next: 1969

Women's downhill World Cup 1967/1968

== Calendar ==
Round	Race No	Place	Country	Date	Winner	Second	Third
1	5	Badgastein	Austria	January 17, 1968	(Austria) Olga Pall	(Austria) Christl Haas	(United Kingdom) Divina Galica
2	8	St. Gervais	France	January 27, 1968	(France) Isabelle Mir	(France) Annie Famose	(Austria) Christl Haas
3	9	Grenoble	France	February 10, 1968	(Austria) Olga Pall	(France) Isabelle Mir	(Austria) Christl Haas
4	12	Chamonix	France	February 23, 1968	(Canada) Nancy Greene	(Austria) Christl Haas	(United Kingdom) Divina Galica
5	16	Abetone	Italy	March 2, 1968	(France) Isabelle Mir	(France) Annie Famose	(France) Florence Steurer
6	17	Aspen	United States	March 15, 1968	(Canada) Nancy Greene	(Austria) Olga Pall	(France) Marielle Goitschel

Note: Round 3/Race 9 was the Olympic event, which count also for the World Cup. See also 1968 Winter Olympics and Alpine skiing at the 1968 Winter Olympics

== Final point standings ==
In women's downhill World Cup 1967/68 the best 3 results count. Deductions are given in brackets.

Place	Name	Country	Total points	Deduction	5 (Austria)	8 (France)	9 (France)	12 (France)	16 (Italy)	17 (United States)
1	Isabelle Mir	France	70		-	25	20	-	25	-
	Olga Pall	Austria	70		25	-	25	-	-	20
3	Christl Haas	Austria	55	(15)	20	15	(15)	20	-	-
4	Nancy Greene	Canada	51		-	-	1	25	-	25
5	Annie Famose	France	48	(4)	(4)	20	8	-	20	-
6	Divina Galica	United Kingdom	32	(2)	15	2	-	15	-	(2)
7	Marielle Goitschel	France	29	(6)	3	11	(3)	(3)	-	15
8	Brigitte Seiwald	Austria	25		11	-	11	-	-	3
9	Florence Steurer	France	23		-	-	2	6	15	-
10	Annerösli Zryd	Switzerland	17		8	1	-	8	-	-
11	Evi Untermoser	Austria	11		-	-	-	11	-	-
	Françoise Macchi	France	11		-	-	-	-	11	-
	Bernadette Rauter	Austria	11		-	-	-	-	-	11
14	Fernande Bochatay	Switzerland	10		-	-	4	-	-	6
	Karen Budge	United States	10		-	6	-	-	-	4
16	Marie France Jean-Georges	France	9		-	8	-	1	-	-
17	Jacqueline Rouvier	France	8		-	-	-	-	8	-
	Vreni Inäbnit	Switzerland	8		-	-	-	-	-	8
19	Burgl Färbinger	West Germany	6		6	-	-	-	-	-
	Felicity Field	United Kingdom	6		-	-	6	-	-	-
	Britt Lafforgue	France	6		-	-	-	-	6	-
22	Wiltrud Drexel	Austria	5		1	-	-	4	-	-
23	Michèle Jacot	France	4		-	4	-	-	-	-
	Paola Strauss	Italy	4		-	-	-	-	4	-
25	Suzy Chaffee	United States	3		-	3	-	-	-	-
	Marie-Cécile Mercier	France	3		-	-	-	-	3	-
	Erica Skinger	United States	3		-	-	-	2	-	1
28	Lisi Pall	Austria	2		2	-	-	-	-	-
	Giovanna Tiezza	Italy	2		-	-	-	-	2	-
30	K. Buhler	Switzerland	1		-	-	-	-	1	-

== Women's downhill team results ==
All points were shown including individual deduction. bold indicate highest score - italics indicate race wins

Place	Country	Total points	5 (Austria)	8 (France)	9 (France)	12 (France)	16 (Italy)	17 (United States)	Racers	Wins
1	France	221	7	68	33	10	**88**	15	10	2
2	Austria	194	59	15	51	35	-	34	7	2
3	Canada	51	-	-	1	25	-	25	1	2
4	United Kingdom	40	15	2	6	15	-	2	2	0
5	Switzerland	36	8	1	4	8	1	14	4	0
6	United States	16	-	9	-	2	-	5	3	0
7	West Germany	6	6	-	-	-	-	-	1	0
	Italy	6	-	-	-	-	6	-	2	0

**Alpine skiing World Cup**
**Women**

Overall | **Downhill** | Giant slalom | Slalom

**1968**
