= Alpine skiing at the 1968 Winter Olympics – Women's downhill =

Women's downhill at the X Olympic Winter Games
- Alpine skiing
- Venue: Chamrousse
- Date: February 10, 1968
- Competitors: 39 from 14 nations
- Winning time: 1:40.87

Medalists
1st place, gold medalist(s)		Olga Pall	Austria
2nd place, silver medalist(s)		Isabelle Mir	France
3rd place, bronze medalist(s)		Christl Haas	Austria

Women's Downhill
- Location: Chamrousse
- Vertical: 602 m (1,975 ft)
- Top elevation: 2,252 m (7,388 ft)
- Base elevation: 1,650 m (5,413 ft)

The Women's Downhill competition of the Grenoble 1968 Olympics was held at Chamrousse on Saturday, 10 February.

The defending world champion was Marielle Goitschel of France, who was also the defending World Cup downhill champion and Austria's Olga Pall led the current season. Christl Haas of Austria was the defending Olympic champion.

Pall won the gold medal, Isabelle Mir of France took the silver, and Haas was the bronze medalist.

The starting gate was at an elevation of 2,252 m (7,388 ft), and the vertical drop was 602 m (1,975 ft). The course length was 2.160 km (1.34 mi) and Pall's winning time of 100.87 seconds resulted in an average speed of 77.089 km/h (47.9 mph), with an average vertical descent rate of 5.968 m/s (19.6 ft/s).

About an hour before the race, eighteen-year-old American Karen Budge was testing her wax on the practice course and narrowly avoided a full collision with a member of the Moroccan men's team, Said Housni, who had been warned once before to stay off the hill. She fell, suffered a dislocated shoulder, and did not start.

== Results ==
Saturday, 10 February 1968

Rank	Bib	Name	Country	Time	Difference
1st place, gold medalist(s)	15	Olga Pall	Austria	1:40.87	—
2nd place, silver medalist(s)	13	Isabelle Mir	France	1:41.33	+0.46
3rd place, bronze medalist(s)	7	Christl Haas	Austria	1:41.41	+0.54
4	8	Brigitte Seiwald	Austria	1:41.82	+0.95
5	14	Annie Famose	France	1:42.15	+1.28
6	21	Felicity Field	Great Britain	1:42.79	+1.92
7	18	Fernande Bochatay	Switzerland	1:42.87	+2.00
8	11	Marielle Goitschel	France	1:42.95	+2.08
9	3	Florence Steurer	France	1:43.00	+2.13
10	5	Nancy Greene	Canada	1:43.12	+2.25
11	10	Annerösli Zryd	Switzerland	1:43.76	+2.89
12	30	Gertrud Gabl	Austria	1:43.97	+3.10
13	6	Giustina Demetz	Italy	1:44.22	+3.35
14	2	Burgl Färbinger	West Germany	1:44.29	+3.42
15	31	Gina Hathorn	Great Britain	1:44.36	+3.49
16	32	Madeleine Wuilloud	Switzerland	1:44.49	+3.62
17	25	Kiki Cutter	United States	1:44.94	+4.07
18	28	Vreni Inäbnit	Switzerland	1:45.16	+4.29
19	1	Margret Hafen	West Germany	1:45.33	+4.46
20	38	Judi Leinweber	Canada	1:45.60	+4.73
21	29	Sandy Shellworth	United States	1:46.53	+5.66
22	20	Karen Dokka	Canada	1:47.55	+6.68
23	27	Betsy Clifford	Canada	1:47.60	+6.73
24	24	Christine Laprell	West Germany	1:47.62	+6.75
25	19	Rosi Mittermaier	West Germany	1:47.73	+6.86
26	37	Helen Jamieson	Great Britain	1:48.03	+7.16
27	36	Nina Merkulova	Soviet Union	1:48.04	+7.17
28	9	Suzy Chaffee	United States	1:48.50	+7.63
29	46	Alfina Sukhanova	Soviet Union	1:48.74	+7.87
30	39	Clotilde Fasolis	Italy	1:48.90	+8.03
31	22	Glorianda Cipolla	Italy	1:49.02	+8.15
32	12	Divina Galica	Great Britain	1:49.39	+8.52
33	23	Anna Mohrová	Czechoslovakia	1:50.22	+9.35
34	48	Mihoko Otsue	Japan	1:51.60	+10.73
35	34	Galina Sidorova	Soviet Union	1:51.74	+10.87
36	35	Majda Ankele	Yugoslavia	1:52.13	+11.26
37	44	Anne Reid	New Zealand	1:53.12	+12.25
38	47	Marta Bühler	Liechtenstein	1:53.53	+12.66
-	26	Lotte Nogler	Italy	DNF	-
-	4	Karen Budge	United States	DNS	-
-	45	Irina Touroundaevsk	Soviet Union	DNS	-
