= 1968 Alpine Skiing World Cup – Women's giant slalom =

1968 Women's giant slalom World Cup
Previous: 1967	Next: 1969

Women's giant slalom World Cup 1967/1968

== Calendar ==
Round	Race No	Place	Country	Date	Winner	Second	Third
1	1	Oberstaufen	West Germany	January 5, 1968	(Switzerland) Fernande Bochatay	(France) Florence Steurer	(Canada) Nancy Greene
2	3	Grindelwald	Switzerland	January 10, 1968	(Canada) Nancy Greene	(France) Marielle Goitschel	(Switzerland) Fernande Bochatay
3	11	Grenoble	France	February 15, 1968	(Canada) Nancy Greene	(France) Annie Famose	(Switzerland) Fernande Bochatay
4	13	Oslo	Norway	February 24, 1968	(Switzerland) Fernande Bochatay	(France) Isabelle Mir	(United States) Kiki Cutter
5	19	Aspen	United States	March 17, 1968	(Canada) Nancy Greene	(France) Marielle Goitschel	(West Germany) Rosi Mittermaier
6	21	Rossland	Canada	March 31, 1968	(Canada) Nancy Greene	(France) Florence Steurer	(Austria) Gertrude Gabl
7	22	Heavenly Valley	United States	April 5, 1968	(Austria) Gertrude Gabl	(France) Florence Steurer	(France) Isabelle Mir

Note: Round 3/Race 11 was the Olympic event, which count also for the World Cup. See also 1968 Winter Olympics and Alpine skiing at the 1968 Winter Olympics

== Final point standings ==
In women's giant slalom World Cup 1967/68 the best 3 results count. Deductions are given in brackets.

Place	Name	Country	Total points	Deduction	1 (Germany)	3 (Switzerland)	11 (France)	13 (Norway)	19 (United States)	21 (Canada)	22 (United States)
1	Nancy Greene	Canada	75	(48)	(15)	25	25	-	25	(25)	(8)
2	Fernande Bochatay	Switzerland	65	(18)	25	15	(15)	25	(2)	(1)	-
3	Florence Steurer	France	60	(19)	20	(8)	(11)	-	-	20	20
4	Gertrude Gabl	Austria	51	(16)	(3)	11	(2)	-	(11)	15	25
5	Marielle Goitschel	France	44		-	20	4	-	20	-	-
6	Isabelle Mir	France	41	(10)	6	(1)	(6)	20	-	(3)	15
7	Annie Famose	France	32	(4)	(4)	-	20	-	-	6	6
8	Rosi Mittermaier	West Germany	29		-	3	-	-	15	11	-
9	Judy Nagel	United States	28	(4)	-	-	-	11	6	(4)	11
10	Kiki Cutter	United States	25	(2)	-	4	-	15	-	(2)	6
11	Divina Galica	United Kingdom	17	(2)	-	6	3	-	8	-	(2)
12	Olga Pall	Austria	16		8	-	8	-	-	-	-
13	Burgl Färbinger	West Germany	14		11	2	1	-	-	-	-
14	Brigitte Seiwald	Austria	10		2	-	-	-	-	8	-
15	Judy Leinweber	Canada	8		-	-	-	8	-	-	-
16	Gina Hathorn	United Kingdom	7		-	-	-	-	4	-	3
17	Dietlinde Wurmer	West Germany	6		-	-	-	6	-	-	-
18	Wendy Allen	United States	4		-	-	-	4	-	-	-
19	Suzy Chaffee	United States	3		-	-	-	3	-	-	-
	Marilyn Cochran	United States	3		-	-	-	-	3	-	-
21	Betsy Clifford	Canada	2		-	-	-	2	-	-	-
22	Robin Morning	United States	1		1	-	-	-	-	-	-
	Penny McCoy	United States	1		-	-	-	1	-	-	-
	Christine Béranger	France	1		-	-	-	-	1	-	-
	Wiltrud Drexel	Austria	1		-	-	-	-	-	-	1

== Women's giant slalom team Results ==
All points were shown including individual deduction. bold indicate highest score - italics indicate race wins

Place	Country	Total points	1 (Germany)	3 (Switzerland)	11 (France)	13 (Norway)	19 (United States)	21 (Canada)	22 (United States)	Racers	Wins
1	France	211	30	29	**41**	20	21	29	**41**	5	0
2	Canada	133	15	25	25	10	25	25	8	3	4
3	Austria	94	13	11	10	-	11	23	26	4	1
4	Switzerland	83	25	15	15	25	2	1	-	1	2
5	United States	71	1	4	-	34	9	6	17	7	0
6	West Germany	49	11	5	1	6	15	11	-	3	0
7	United Kingdom	26	-	6	3	-	12	-	5	2	0

**Alpine Skiing World Cup**
**Women**

Overall | Downhill | **Giant slalom** | Slalom

**1968**
