= Golden Fox =

FIS Alpine Ski World Cup race

Golden Fox Zlata lisica
- Golden Fox logo
- Status: Active
- Genre: FIS Alpine Ski World Cup
- Frequency: Annual
- Location: Kranjska Gora Ski Resort
- Country: Slovenia
- Inaugurated: 1964; 62 years ago
- Founder: Dušan Senčar; Marjan Kožuh; Franci Čop
- Most recent: 2024; 2 years ago
- Organiser: International Ski Federation

The Golden Fox (Slovene: Zlata lisica) is a FIS Alpine Ski World Cup competition for women, which takes place annually in Slovenia. The competition was founded in 1964 by Dušan Senčar, Marjan Kožuh and Franci Čop.

Since its first edition, most of the races have taken place in Maribor at the Pohorje Ski Resort, however, in the 2020s, the event was moved to Kranjska Gora due to a lack of snow in Maribor. After the 60th edition in 2024, the competition temporarily ceased to exist, but was revived in 2026 for the 2026–27 World Cup season.

== History ==
The first competition was held between 29 February and 1 March 1964, when there were two slalom races. The first race, which was contested by 31 athletes and watched by 5,000 spectators, was won by Marielle Goitschel. Initially, the competition took place on the old FIS course, but in 1978, it was moved to the Snow Stadium in Maribor.

== List of winners ==
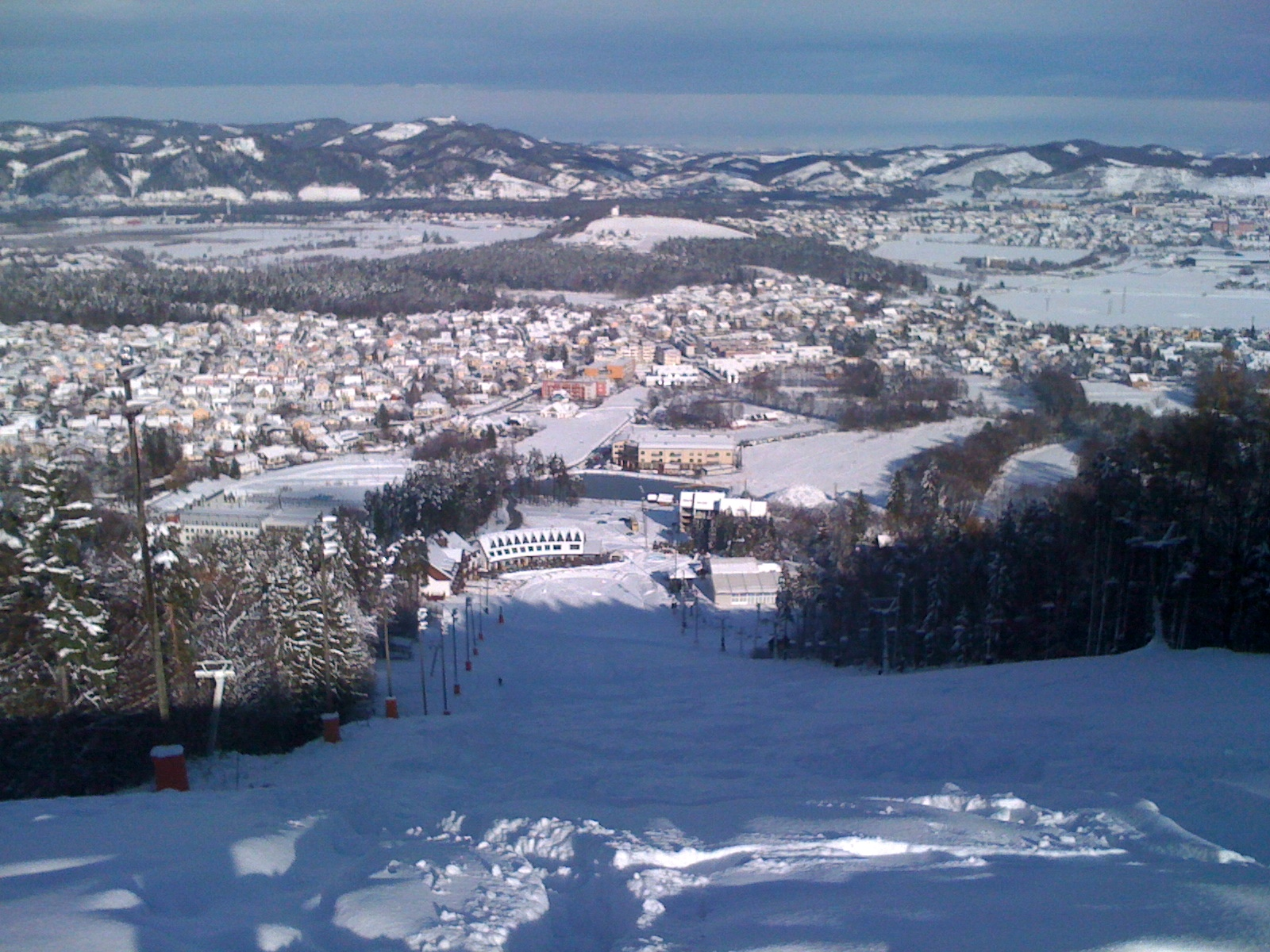
The Maribor Pohorje Ski Resort hosted most of the events.

The Golden Fox trophy is awarded to the skier with the best result in the slalom and giant slalom combined.

Key

- SL = Slalom
- GS = Giant slalom
- — = The event was not scheduled or was interrupted/cancelled due to weather conditions

List of Goldex Fox editions, winners and locations
Edition	Year	Location	Slalom winner	Giant slalom winner	Golden Fox winner
1st	1964	Maribor	(France) Marielle Goitschel (SL 1) (France) Marielle Goitschel (SL 2)	—N/a	(France) Marielle Goitschel
2nd	1965	Maribor	(France) Florence Steurer	(France) Florence Steurer	(France) Florence Steurer
3rd	1966	Maribor	(France) Fernande Bochatay (SL 1) (Austria) Traudl Hecher (SL 2)	—N/a	(Austria) Grete Digruber
4th	1967	Maribor	(Austria) Hiltrud Rohrbach	Marie-France Jean-Georges	Marie-France Jean-Georges
5th	1968	Maribor	(Austria) Gertrud Gabl	(Austria) Olga Pall	(Austria) Gertrud Gabl
6th	1969	Maribor	(United States) Rosie Fortna	(France) Michèle Jacot	(France) Michèle Jacot
7th	1970	Maribor	(United States) Barbara Ann Cochran	(Austria) Annemarie Moser-Pröll	(United States) Barbara Ann Cochran
8th	1971	Maribor	(Austria) Annemarie Moser-Pröll	(France) Françoise Macchi	(Austria) Annemarie Moser-Pröll
9th	1972	Maribor	—N/a	(France) Françoise Macchi	(France) Françoise Macchi
10th	1973	Maribor	(France) Patricia Emonet	—N/a	(France) Patricia Emonet
11th	1974	Bad Gastein	—N/a	(France) Fabienne Serrat	(France) Fabienne Serrat
12th	1975	Sarajevo	—N/a	(Austria) Annemarie Moser-Pröll	(Austria) Annemarie Moser-Pröll
13th	1976	Kranjska Gora	(Switzerland) Lise-Marie Morerod	(Switzerland) Lise-Marie Morerod	(Switzerland) Lise-Marie Morerod
14th	1977	Maribor	(Italy) Claudia Giordani	(Switzerland) Lise-Marie Morerod	(Austria) Monika Kaserer
15th	1978	Maribor	(Liechtenstein) Hanni Wenzel	—N/a	(Liechtenstein) Hanni Wenzel
16th	1979	Maribor	(Liechtenstein) Hanni Wenzel	—N/a	(Liechtenstein) Hanni Wenzel
17th	1980	Maribor	(Liechtenstein) Hanni Wenzel	—N/a	(Liechtenstein) Hanni Wenzel
18th	1981	Maribor	—N/a	(Switzerland) Marie-Theres Nadig	(Switzerland) Marie-Theres Nadig
19th	1982	Maribor	(Switzerland) Erika Hess	—N/a	(Switzerland) Erika Hess
20th	1983	Maribor	(Switzerland) Erika Hess	—N/a	(Switzerland) Erika Hess
21st	1984	Maribor	(Switzerland) Erika Hess	—N/a	(Switzerland) Erika Hess
22nd	1985	Maribor	(United States) Tamara McKinney	(Switzerland) Michela Figini	(Switzerland) Erika Hess
23rd	1986	Maribor	(Austria) Roswitha Steiner	(Switzerland) Vreni Schneider	(Switzerland) Vreni Schneider
24th	1987	Maribor	(Sweden) Camilla Nilsson	—N/a	(Sweden) Camilla Nilsson
25th	1988	Kranjska Gora	(Socialist Federal Republic of Yugoslavia) Mateja Svet	(Socialist Federal Republic of Yugoslavia) Mateja Svet	(Socialist Federal Republic of Yugoslavia) Mateja Svet
26th	1989	Maribor	(Switzerland) Vreni Schneider	—N/a	(Switzerland) Vreni Schneider
27th	1990	Maribor	(Switzerland) Vreni Schneider	(Socialist Federal Republic of Yugoslavia) Mateja Svet	(Socialist Federal Republic of Yugoslavia) Mateja Svet
28th	1991	Kranjska Gora	(Socialist Federal Republic of Yugoslavia) Nataša Bokal	(Switzerland) Vreni Schneider	(Switzerland) Vreni Schneider
29th	1992	Maribor	(Switzerland) Vreni Schneider	—N/a	(Switzerland) Vreni Schneider
30th	1993	Maribor	(Switzerland) Vreni Schneider	(France) Carole Merle	(Switzerland) Vreni Schneider
31st	1994	Maribor	(Switzerland) Vreni Schneider	(Austria) Ulrike Maier	(Switzerland) Vreni Schneider
32nd	1995	Maribor	(Switzerland) Vreni Schneider	(Germany) Martina Ertl	(Switzerland) Vreni Schneider
33rd	1996	Maribor	(Sweden) Kristina Andersson	(Germany) Martina Ertl	(Germany) Martina Ertl
34th	1997	Maribor	(Sweden) Pernilla Wiberg	(Italy) Sabina Panzanini	(Slovenia) Urška Hrovat
35th	1999	Maribor	(Sweden) Pernilla Wiberg	(Austria) Anita Wachter	(Austria) Anita Wachter
36th	2000	Maribor	(Norway) Trine Bakke	(Austria) Michaela Dorfmeister	(Switzerland) Sonja Nef
37th	2001	Maribor	—N/a	(Switzerland) Sonja Nef	(Switzerland) Sonja Nef
38th	2002	Maribor	(Sweden) Anja Pärson	(Switzerland) Sonja Nef	(Switzerland) Sonja Nef
39th	2003	Maribor	(Sweden) Anja Pärson	(Sweden) Anja Pärson	(Sweden) Anja Pärson
40th	2004	Maribor	(Sweden) Anja Pärson	(Sweden) Anja Pärson	(Sweden) Anja Pärson
41st	2005	Maribor	(Sweden) Anja Pärson	(Slovenia) Tina Maze	(Sweden) Anja Pärson
42nd	2006	Maribor	(Austria) Marlies Schild	—N/a	(Austria) Marlies Schild
43rd	2007	Kranjska Gora	(Austria) Marlies Schild	(Austria) Nicole Hosp	(Czech Republic) Šárka Záhrobská
44th	2008	Maribor	(Austria) Nicole Hosp	(Austria) Elisabeth Görgl	(Austria) Nicole Hosp
45th	2009	Maribor	(Germany) Maria Höfl-Riesch	(Slovenia) Tina Maze	(Germany) Maria Höfl-Riesch
46th	2010	Maribor	(Austria) Kathrin Zettel	(Austria) Kathrin Zettel	(Austria) Kathrin Zettel
47th	2011	Maribor	—N/a	—N/a	Not awarded
48th	2012	Kranjska Gora	(Austria) Michaela Kirchgasser	(France) Tessa Worley	(Finland) Tanja Poutiainen
49th	2013	Maribor	(Slovenia) Tina Maze	(United States) Lindsey Vonn	(Slovenia) Tina Maze
50th	2014	Kranjska Gora	(Sweden) Frida Hansdotter	—N/a	(Sweden) Frida Hansdotter
51st	2015	Maribor	(United States) Mikaela Shiffrin	(Austria) Anna Fenninger	(United States) Mikaela Shiffrin
52nd	2016	Maribor	—N/a	(Germany) Viktoria Rebensburg	(Germany) Viktoria Rebensburg
53rd	2017	Maribor	(United States) Mikaela Shiffrin	(France) Tessa Worley	(United States) Mikaela Shiffrin
54th	2018	Kranjska Gora	(United States) Mikaela Shiffrin	(United States) Mikaela Shiffrin	(United States) Mikaela Shiffrin
55th	2019	Maribor	(United States) Mikaela Shiffrin	(Slovakia) Petra Vlhová (United States) Mikaela Shiffrin	(United States) Mikaela Shiffrin
56th	2020	Kranjska Gora	(Slovakia) Petra Vlhová	(New Zealand) Alice Robinson	(Slovakia) Petra Vlhová
57th	2021	Kranjska Gora	—N/a	(Italy) Marta Bassino (GS 1) (Italy) Marta Bassino (GS 2)	(Italy) Marta Bassino
58th	2022	Kranjska Gora	(Slovakia) Petra Vlhová	(Sweden) Sara Hector	(Slovakia) Petra Vlhová
59th	2023	Kranjska Gora	—N/a	(Canada) Valérie Grenier (GS 1) (United States) Mikaela Shiffrin (GS 2)	(Italy) Federica Brignone
60th	2024	Kranjska Gora	(Slovakia) Petra Vlhová	(Canada) Valérie Grenier	(Slovakia) Petra Vlhová
