= 1968 FIS Alpine Ski World Cup =

International sports competition

FIS Alpine Ski World Cup 1968
Discipline	Men	Women
Overall	(France) Jean-Claude Killy	(Canada) Nancy Greene
Downhill	(Austria) Gerhard Nenning	(France) Isabelle Mir
Giant slalom	(France) Jean-Claude Killy	(Canada) Nancy Greene
Slalom	(Switzerland) Dumeng Giovanoli	(France) Marielle Goitschel
Nations Cup	Austria	France
- Nations Cup overall: France

Competition
Locations	12	11
Individual	20	23

The 2nd World Cup season began in January in West Germany and concluded in April in the US Jean-Claude Killy of France repeated as the overall champion, and announced his retirement from World Cup competition. Nancy Greene of Canada repeated as the women's World Cup overall champion, and announced her retirement from World Cup competition.

For the only time, the results of the Winter Olympics were included in the season standings. Future Olympic results were not included as World Cup races, nor were World Championship results after 1970. However, the inclusion of the Olympics was irrelevant to the final outcome, as both Killy and Greene would have won the season titles had the Olympics been excluded.

== Calendar ==
=== Men ===
Event key: DH – Downhill, SL – Slalom, GS – Giant slalom
Race	Season	Date	Place	Type	Winner	Second	Third
18	1	4 January 1968	(West Germany) Hindelang	GS _{006}	(Switzerland) Edmund Bruggmann	(France) Jean-Claude Killy	(Switzerland) Dumeng Giovanoli
19	2	8 January 1968	(Switzerland) Adelboden	GS _{007}	(France) Jean-Claude Killy	(Switzerland) Edmund Bruggmann	(Switzerland) Stefan Kälin
20	3	13 January 1968	(Switzerland) Wengen	DH _{006}	(Austria) Gerhard Nenning	(Austria) Karl Schranz	(Switzerland) Edmund Bruggmann
21	4	14 January 1968	(Switzerland) Wengen	SL _{008}	(Switzerland) Dumeng Giovanoli	(Norway) Håkon Mjøen	(Austria) Alfred Matt
22	5	20 January 1968	(Austria) Kitzbühel	DH _{007}	(Austria) Gerhard Nenning	(France) Jean-Claude Killy	(Switzerland) Andreas Sprecher
23	6	21 January 1968	(Austria) Kitzbühel	SL _{009}	(Switzerland) Dumeng Giovanoli	(Austria) Alfred Matt	(France) Jean-Claude Killy
24	7	9 February 1968	(France) Grenoble (1968 Winter Olympics)	DH _{008}	(France) Jean-Claude Killy	(France) Guy Périllat	(Switzerland) Jean-Daniel Dätwyler
25	8	12 February 1968	(France) Grenoble (1968 Winter Olympics)	GS _{008}	(France) Jean-Claude Killy	(Switzerland) Willy Favre	(Austria) Heinrich Messner
26	9	17 February 1968	(France) Grenoble (1968 Winter Olympics)	SL _{010}	(France) Jean-Claude Killy	(Austria) Herbert Huber	(Austria) Alfred Matt
27	10	24 February 1968	(France) Chamonix	DH _{009}	(France) Bernard Orcel	(Switzerland) Kurt Huggler	(France) Guy Périllat
28	11	24 February 1968	(Norway) Oslo	GS _{009}	(Austria) Werner Bleiner	(Switzerland) Dumeng Giovanoli	(Switzerland) Edmund Bruggmann
29	12	25 February 1968	(Norway) Oslo	SL _{011}	(France) Patrick Russel	(Switzerland) Dumeng Giovanoli	(Norway) Håkon Mjøen
30	13	10 March 1968	(Socialist Federal Republic of Yugoslavia) Kranjska Gora	SL _{012}	(France) Patrick Russel	(Austria) Franz Digruber	(Switzerland) Stefan Kälin
31	14	10 March 1968	(France) Méribel	GS _{010}	(France) Jean-Claude Killy	(France) Georges Mauduit	(France) Guy Périllat
32	15	15 March 1968	(United States) Aspen	DH _{010}	(Austria) Gerhard Nenning	(Austria) Heinrich Messner	(France) Jean-Claude Killy
33	16	16 March 1968	(United States) Aspen	SL _{013}	(United States) Billy Kidd	(Austria) Herbert Huber	(Austria) Alfred Matt
34	17	29 March 1968	(Canada) Rossland	SL _{014}	(France) Jean-Claude Killy	(France) Jean-Pierre Augert	(United States) Rick Chaffee
35	18	31 March 1968	(Canada) Rossland	GS _{011}	(Austria) Herbert Huber	(Austria) Reinhard Tritscher	(France) Guy Périllat
36	19	6 April 1968	(United States) Heavenly Valley	GS _{012}	(Austria) Herbert Huber	(France) Georges Mauduit	(Austria) Reinhard Tritscher
37	20	7 April 1968	(United States) Heavenly Valley	SL _{015}	(United States) Spider Sabich	(Austria) Herbert Huber	(United States) Rick Chaffee

Note: Race 7, 8 and 9 were the Olympic events at Grenoble, which count also for the World Cup. See also 1968 Winter Olympics and Alpine skiing at the 1968 Winter Olympics.

Race 10 and 11 were held on the same day.

=== Women ===
Event key: DH – Downhill, SL – Slalom, GS – Giant slalom
Race	Season	Date	Place	Type	Winner	Second	Third
18	1	5 January 1968	(West Germany) Oberstaufen	GS _{007}	(Switzerland) Fernande Bochatay	(France) Florence Steurer	(Canada) Nancy Greene
19	2	6 January 1968	(West Germany) Oberstaufen	SL _{008}	(France) Marielle Goitschel	(Austria) Gertrude Gabl	(Canada) Nancy Greene
20	3	10 January 1968	(Switzerland) Grindelwald	GS _{008}	(Canada) Nancy Greene	(France) Marielle Goitschel	(Switzerland) Fernande Bochatay
21	4	11 January 1968	(Switzerland) Grindelwald	SL _{009}	(Austria) Gertrude Gabl	(France) Isabelle Mir	(France) Marielle Goitschel
22	5	17 January 1968	(Austria) Bad Gastein	DH _{005}	(Austria) Olga Pall	(Austria) Christl Haas	(United Kingdom) Divina Galica
23	6	18 January 1968	(Austria) Bad Gastein	SL _{010}	(France) Florence Steurer	(France) Marielle Goitschel	(Austria) Gertrude Gabl
24	7	25 January 1968	(France) St. Gervais	SL _{011}	(Switzerland) Fernande Bochatay	(France) Florence Steurer	(United States) Kiki Cutter
25	8	27 January 1968	(France) St. Gervais	DH _{006}	(France) Isabelle Mir	(France) Annie Famose	(Austria) Christl Haas
26	9	10 February 1968	(France) Grenoble (1968 Winter Olympics)	DH _{007}	(Austria) Olga Pall	(France) Isabelle Mir	(Austria) Christl Haas
27	10	13 February 1968	(France) Grenoble (1968 Winter Olympics)	SL _{012}	(France) Marielle Goitschel	(Canada) Nancy Greene	(France) Annie Famose
28	11	15 February 1968	(France) Grenoble (1968 Winter Olympics)	GS _{009}	(Canada) Nancy Greene	(France) Annie Famose	(Switzerland) Fernande Bochatay
29	12	23 February 1968	(France) Chamonix	DH _{008}	(Canada) Nancy Greene	(Austria) Christl Haas	(United Kingdom) Divina Galica
30	13	24 February 1968	(Norway) Oslo	GS _{010}	(Switzerland) Fernande Bochatay	(France) Isabelle Mir	(United States) Kiki Cutter
31	14	25 February 1968	(Norway) Oslo	SL _{013}	(United States) Kiki Cutter	(France) Isabelle Mir	(United States) Wendy Allen
32	15	1 March 1968	(Italy) Abetone	SL _{014}	(France) Florence Steurer	(France) Annie Famose	(France) Britt Lafforgue
33	16	2 March 1968	(Italy) Abetone	DH _{009}	(France) Isabelle Mir	(France) Annie Famose	(France) Florence Steurer
34	17	15 March 1968	(United States) Aspen	DH _{010}	(Canada) Nancy Greene	(Austria) Olga Pall	(France) Marielle Goitschel
35	18	16 March 1968	(United States) Aspen	SL _{015}	(Canada) Nancy Greene	(Austria) Gertrude Gabl	(United States) Kiki Cutter
36	19	17 March 1968	(United States) Aspen	GS _{011}	(Canada) Nancy Greene	(France) Marielle Goitschel	(West Germany) Rosi Mittermaier
37	20	28 March 1968	(Canada) Rossland	SL _{016}	(France) Marielle Goitschel	(Switzerland) Fernande Bochatay	(United States) Kiki Cutter
38	21	31 March 1968	(Canada) Rossland	GS _{012}	(Canada) Nancy Greene	(France) Florence Steurer	(Austria) Gertrude Gabl
39	22	5 April 1968	(United States) Heavenly Valley	GS _{013}	(Austria) Gertrude Gabl	(France) Florence Steurer	(France) Isabelle Mir
40	23	6 April 1968	(United States) Heavenly Valley	SL _{017}	(Austria) Gertrude Gabl	(Canada) Nancy Greene	(United States) Judy Nagel

Note: Race 9, 10 and 11 were the Olympic events at Grenoble, which count also for the World Cup. See also 1968 Winter Olympics and Alpine skiing at the 1968 Winter Olympics.

== Men ==
=== Overall ===
see complete table

In men's overall World Cup 1967/68 the best three downhills, best three giant slaloms and best three slaloms count. 12 racers had a point deduction.

Place	Name	Country	Total	DH	GS	SL
1	Jean-Claude Killy	France	200	60	75	65
2	Dumeng Giovanoli	Switzerland	119	6	43	70
3	Herbert Huber	Austria	112	0	52	60
4	Gerhard Nenning	Austria	102	75	10	17
5	Guy Périllat	France	83	37	41	5
6	Edmund Bruggmann	Switzerland	80	17	60	3
7	Billy Kidd	United States	73	17	30	26
8	Karl Schranz	Austria	69	39	22	8
9	Patrick Russel	France	67	0	6	61
10	Heinrich Messner	Austria	63	31	15	17
11	Georges Mauduit	France	57	0	51	6
12	Håkon Mjøen	Norway	52	0	11	41
13	Alfred Matt	Austria	51	0	1	50
14	Rick Chaffee	United States	46	0	8	38
15	Jean-Pierre Augert	France	44	0	14	30

=== Downhill ===
see complete table

In men's downhill World Cup 1967/68 the best 3 results count. Four racers had a point deduction, which are given in (). Gerhard Nenning won the cup with maximum points.

Place	Name	Country	Total	3 (Switzerland)	5 (Austria)	7 (France)	10 (France)	15 (United States)
1	Gerhard Nenning	Austria	75	25	25	(2)	–	25
2	Jean-Claude Killy	France	60	–	20	25	–	15
3	Karl Schranz	Austria	39	20	11	8	–	(8)
4	Bernard Orcel	France	37	4	8	(3)	25	–
	Guy Périllat	France	37	2	–	20	15	–
	Jean-Daniel Dätwyler	Switzerland	37	11	–	15	11	(3)
7	Heinrich Messner	Austria	31	–	–	11	–	20
8	Kurt Huggler	Switzerland	20	–	–	–	20	–
9	Edmund Bruggmann	Switzerland	17	15	1	1	–	–
	Billy Kidd	United States	17	–	6	–	–	11

=== Giant slalom ===
see complete table

In men's giant slalom World Cup 1967/68 the best 3 results count. Five racers had a point deduction, which are given in (). Jean-Claude Killy won the cup with maximum points.

Place	Name	Country	Total	1 (Germany)	2 (Switzerland)	8 (France)	11 (Norway)	14 (France)	18 (Canada)	19 (United States)
1	Jean-Claude Killy	France	75	(20)	25	25	–	25	(2)	–
2	Edmund Bruggmann	Switzerland	60	25	20	–	15	–	(6)	–
3	Herbert Huber	Austria	52	–	2	–	–	–	25	25
4	Georges Mauduit	France	51	(1)	–	(2)	–	20	11	20
5	Dumeng Giovanoli	Switzerland	43	15	(6)	(4)	20	–	8	(1)
6	Guy Périllat	France	41	–	–	11	–	15	15	(6)
7	Reinhard Tritscher	Austria	35	–	–	–	–	–	20	15
8	Billy Kidd	United States	30	11	11	8	–	–	–	–
9	Willy Favre	Switzerland	28	4	4	20	–	–	–	–
	Werner Bleiner	Austria	28	2	1	–	25	–	–	–

=== Slalom ===
see complete table

In men's slalom World Cup 1967/68 the best 3 results count. Five racers had a point deduction, which are given in ().

Place	Name	Country	Total	4 (Switzerland)	6 (Austria)	9 (France)	12 (Norway)	13 (Socialist Federal Republic of Yugoslavia)	16 (United States)	17 (Canada)	20 (United States)
1	Dumeng Giovanoli	Switzerland	70	25	25	(11)	20	–	–	–	–
2	Jean-Claude Killy	France	65	–	15	25	–	–	(11)	25	(4)
3	Patrick Russel	France	61	–	–	–	25	25	–	–	11
4	Herbert Huber	Austria	60	(4)	(11)	20	–	–	20	–	20
5	Alfred Matt	Austria	50	15	20	15	–	–	(15)	(11)	–
6	Håkon Mjøen	Norway	41	20	6	–	15	–	–	–	–
7	Rick Chaffee	United States	38	–	(3)	(2)	8	–	–	15	15
8	Spider Sabich	United States	37	(3)	–	8	–	–	–	4	25
9	Jean-Pierre Augert	France	30	–	4	–	–	–	–	20	6
10	Billy Kidd	United States	26	1	–	–	–	–	25	–	–

== Women ==
=== Overall ===
see complete table

In women's overall World Cup 1967/68 the best three downhills, best three giant slaloms and best three slaloms count. 13 racers had a point deduction.

Place	Name	Country	Total	DH	GS	SL
1	Nancy Greene	Canada	191	51	75	65
2	Isabelle Mir	France	159	70	41	48
3	Florence Steurer	France	153	23	60	70
4	Marielle Goitschel	France	148	29	44	75
5	Fernande Bochatay	Switzerland	126	10	65	51
6	Annie Famose	France	123	48	32	43
7	Gertrude Gabl	Austria	121	0	51	70
8	Olga Pall	Austria	89	70	16	3
9	Kiki Cutter	United States	80	0	25	55
10	Christl Haas	Austria	55	55	0	0
11	Judy Nagel	United States	53	0	28	25
12	Divina Galica	United Kingdom	49	32	17	0
13	Rosi Mittermaier	West Germany	47	0	29	18
	Brigitte Seiwald	Austria	47	25	10	12
15	Wendy Allen	United States	41	0	4	37

=== Downhill ===
see complete table

In women's giant slalom World Cup 1967/68 the best 3 results count. Four racers had a point deduction, which are given in ().

Place	Name	Country	Total	5 (Austria)	8 (France)	9 (France)	12 (France)	16 (Italy)	17 (United States)
1	Isabelle Mir	France	70	–	25	20	–	25	–
	Olga Pall	Austria	70	25	–	25	–	–	20
3	Christl Haas	Austria	55	20	15	(15)	20	–	–
4	Nancy Greene	Canada	51	–	–	1	25	–	25
5	Annie Famose	France	48	(4)	20	8	–	20	–
6	Divina Galica	United Kingdom	32	15	2	–	15	–	(2)
7	Marielle Goitschel	France	29	3	11	(3)	(3)	–	15
8	Brigitte Seiwald	Austria	25	11	–	11	–	–	3
9	Florence Steurer	France	23	–	–	2	6	15	–
10	Annerösli Zryd	Switzerland	17	8	1	–	8	–	–

=== Giant slalom ===
see complete table

In women's giant slalom World Cup 1967/68 the best 3 results count. Nine racers had a point deduction, which are given in (). Nancy Greene won the cup with maximum points.

Place	Name	Country	Total	1 (Germany)	3 (Switzerland)	11 (France)	13 (Norway)	19 (United States)	21 (Canada)	22 (United States)
1	Nancy Greene	Canada	75	(15)	25	25	–	25	(25)	(8)
2	Fernande Bochatay	Switzerland	65	25	15	(15)	25	(2)	(1)	–
3	Florence Steurer	France	60	20	(8)	(11)	–	–	20	20
4	Gertrude Gabl	Austria	51	(3)	11	(2)	–	(11)	15	25
5	Marielle Goitschel	France	44	–	20	4	–	20	–	–
6	Isabelle Mir	France	41	6	(1)	(6)	20	–	(3)	15
7	Annie Famose	France	32	(4)	–	20	–	–	6	6
8	Rosi Mittermaier	West Germany	29	–	3	–	–	15	11	–
9	Judy Nagel	United States	28	–	–	–	11	6	(4)	11
10	Kiki Cutter	United States	25	–	4	–	15	–	(2)	6

=== Slalom ===
see complete table

In women's slalom World Cup 1967/68 the best 3 results count. Ten racers had a point deduction, which are given in (). Marielle Goitschel won the cup with maximum points.

Place	Name	Country	Total	2 (Germany)	4 (Switzerland)	6 (Austria)	7 (France)	10 (France)	14 (Norway)	15 (Italy)	18 (United States)	20 (Canada)	23 (United States)
1	Marielle Goitschel	France	75	25	(15)	(20)	(11)	25	–	–	–	25	–
2	Florence Steurer	France	70	(2)	–	25	20	–	–	25	–	–	–
	Gertrude Gabl	Austria	70	20	25	(15)	–	–	–	–	(20)	–	25
4	Nancy Greene	Canada	65	(15)	–	–	–	20	–	–	25	–	20
5	Kiki Cutter	United States	55	–	(4)	–	15	–	25	–	15	(15)	–
6	Fernande Bochatay	Switzerland	51	–	(1)	(4)	25	–	–	–	6	20	–
7	Isabelle Mir	France	48	–	20	8	(4)	(8)	20	–	–	–	(8)
8	Annie Famose	France	43	8	–	–	–	15	–	20	–	–	–
9	Wendy Allen	United States	37	–	11	(6)	(8)	–	15	–	(3)	11	(11)
10	Judy Nagel	United States	25	–	–	(3)	6	–	–	–	4	–	15

== Nations Cup ==
=== Overall ===
Place	Country	Total	Men	Ladies
1	France	1340	548	792
2	Austria	1005	594	411
3	Switzerland	588	413	175
4	United States	504	188	316
5	Canada	272	5	267
6	West Germany	135	30	105
7	United Kingdom	90	2	88
8	Norway	69	58	11
9	Italy	37	15	22
10	Poland	14	14	0
11	Sweden	11	11	0
	Czechoslovakia	11	11	0
13	Yugoslavia	9	9	0

=== Men ===
Place	Country	Total	DH	GS	SL	Racers	Wins
1	Austria	594	166	178	250	17	6
2	France	548	137	224	187	9	9
3	Switzerland	413	114	185	114	14	3
4	United States	188	29	39	120	6	2
5	Norway	58	0	15	43	4	0
6	West Germany	30	22	8	0	5	0
7	Italy	15	10	3	2	3	0
8	Poland	14	0	0	14	1	0
9	Sweden	11	0	0	11	1	0
	Czechoslovakia	11	0	11	0	1	0
11	Yugoslavia	9	0	0	9	3	0
12	Canada	5	0	0	5	2	0
13	United Kingdom	2	0	2	0	1	0

=== Women ===
Place	Country	Total	DH	GS	SL	Racers	Wins
1	France	792	221	211	360	12	7
2	Austria	411	194	94	123	8	5
3	United States	316	16	71	229	15	1
4	Canada	267	51	133	83	3	7
5	Switzerland	175	36	83	56	4	3
6	West Germany	105	6	49	50	6	0
7	United Kingdom	88	40	26	22	4	0
8	Italy	22	6	0	16	5	0
9	Norway	11	0	0	11	2	0

== Medal table ==
Rank	Nation	Gold	Silver	Bronze	Total
1	France	16	21	11	48
2	Austria	11	13	9	33
3	Canada	7	2	2	11
4	Switzerland	6	6	9	21
5	United States	3	0	8	11
6	Norway	0	1	1	2
7	Great Britain	0	0	2	2
8	West Germany	0	0	1	1
Totals (8 entries)		43	43	43	129
