= Erica Skinger =

American alpine skier (born 1949)

Personal information
- Born: March 21, 1949 (age 77) Burlington, Vermont, U.S.

Skiing career
- Sport: Alpine skiing
- Club: Mt. Mansfield Ski Club
- Disciplines: Downhill, Slalom
- World Cup debut: January 1968 (age 18)

Olympics
- Teams: 0

World Championships
- Teams: 0

World Cup
- Podiums: 0 - (8 top tens)
- Overall titles: 0 – (24th in 1968)
- Discipline titles: 0 – (10th in DH, 1969)

Erica Adams "Rickey" Skinger (born March 21, 1949) is a former World Cup alpine ski racer from the United States.

== Early years ==
Born in Burlington, Vermont, she was one of three daughters of Joseph and Constance Adams Skinger. The family moved from Alburg Springs on Lake Champlain to Stowe in 1957, where Skinger learned to ski and race on Mount Mansfield at the Stowe ski area. Her father Joe was a sculptor and jeweler and the family also operated a ski inn, the Tucker House Lodge on Mountain Road.

== U.S. Ski Team ==
While in her late teens, Skinger was a member of the U.S. Ski Team. She was one of three teenagers (with Kiki Cutter and Judy Nagel) that arrived in Europe a month before the 1968 Winter Olympics to gain experience and also challenge for spots on the U.S. Olympic team. Allowed four entrants for each of the three Olympic alpine events, the U.S. team was traditionally selected at the previous year's national championships in March, but head coach Bob Beattie was dissatisfied with the women's team's performance in late 1967. Skinger did not make the U.S. Olympic team (Cutter and Nagel did) but had eight top ten finishes in World Cup competition, four in downhill and four in slalom in just over a year, from January 1968 to January 1969.

== World Cup results ==
- 8 top tens – (4 DH, 4 SL)

Season	Date	Location	Discipline	Place
1968	18 Jan 1968	Bad Gastein, Austria	Slalom	10th
1968	23 Feb 1968	Chamonix, France	Downhill	9th
1968	15 Mar 1968	(United States) Aspen, USA	Downhill	10th
1968	28 Mar 1968	Rossland, Canada	Slalom	6th
1968	6 Apr 1968	(United States) Heavenly Valley, USA	Slalom	8th
1969	10 Jan 1969	Grindelwald, Switzerland	Downhill	9th
1969	15 Jan 1969	Schruns, Austria	Downhill	5th
1969	23 Jan 1969	St. Gervais, France	Slalom	10th
