= Wendy Allen =

Wendy Allen may refer to:

- Wendy Allen (skier)
- Wendy Allen (softball)
