= Hintermaier =

Hintermaier is a German surname. Notable people with the surname include:

- Christl Hintermaier (born 1946), German alpine skier
- Reinhold Hintermaier (born 1956), Austrian footballer
