= Irene Viaene =

Argentine alpine skier (born 1949)

Personal information
- Born: 7 December 1949 (age 75); Ituzaingó, Argentina

Sport
- Sport: Alpine skiing

Irene Viaene (born 7 December 1949) is an Argentine alpine skier. She competed in two events at the 1968 Winter Olympics.

== Professional career ==
Viaene competed in the 1968 Winter Olympics, participating in two events. In the women's giant slalom she finished in the 37th place and in the women's slalom she did not finish.
