= Ingrid Sundberg =

Swedish alpine skier (born 1948)

Ingrid Sundberg (born 25 October 1948 in Stockholm, Sweden) is a retired Swedish alpine skier who competed in the 1968 Winter Olympics, finishing 35th in the women's giant slalom and 21st in the women's slalom.
