= Bob Beattie (skiing) =

American skiing coach and sports commentator

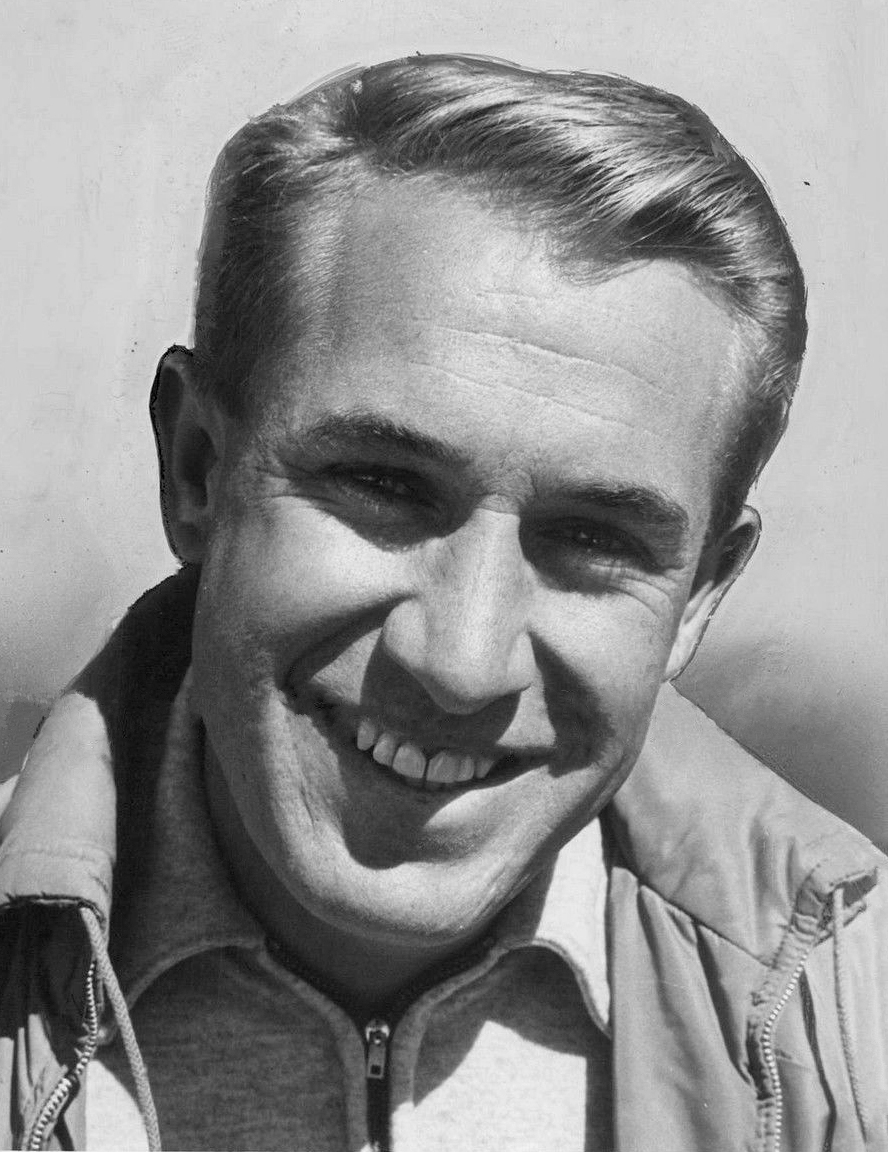
- Bob Beattie in 1966
- Born: Robert Prime Beattie; January 24, 1933; Manchester, New Hampshire, U.S.
- Died: April 1, 2018 (aged 85); Fruita, Colorado, U.S.
- Education: Middlebury College
- Occupation(s): Sportscaster, skiing coach
- Years active: 1955–2018
- Spouses: Kiki Cutter (m. 1971; div. 1973) Cheryl Britton (m. 1980; div. 1987): Marci Beattie (Until his death)
- Children: 2

Robert Prime Beattie (/biːˈætiː/ bee-AT-ee; January 24, 1933 – April 1, 2018) was an American skiing coach, skiing promoter and commentator for ABC Sports and ESPN. He was head coach of the U.S. Ski Team from 1961 to 1969 and co-founded the Alpine Skiing World Cup in 1966. His work as a ski-racing commentator for ABC included four Winter Olympic Games, from 1976 through 1988.

== Early life ==
Beattie was born in Manchester, New Hampshire, on January 24, 1933, to Robert Archibald Beattie (1904–1975), a sales manager for a roofing company, and Katherine Simpson (née Prime; 1906–1995), a homemaker. He had a younger brother, John M. He graduated from Manchester Central High School in 1950. He attended Middlebury College in Vermont, where he participated in several sports, including football, tennis, cross country, and skiing. After graduating in 1955 with a degree in education, he remained at Middlebury as an assistant coach.

== Coaching career ==
In 1956, Beattie was named acting coach of the school's ski team after coach Bobo Sheehan left to coach the alpine skiers on the 1956 U.S. Olympic Team. In 1957, Beattie became the head skiing coach for the University of Colorado in Boulder, and during his tenure the team won the NCAA national titles in 1959 and 1960. In 1961, the U.S. Ski Association named Beattie the U.S. Ski Team's head alpine coach. He continued to work concurrently for the university until 1965.

During his coaching years, Beattie was known as a demanding coach, driving his athletes hard. At the 1964 Winter Olympics in Austria, the Beattie-coached U.S. team won two medals, both in the men's slalom: a silver earned by Billy Kidd and a bronze by Jimmie Heuga. They were the country's first-ever Olympic medals in men's skiing. During the 1968 Winter Olympics in France, the U.S. Ski Team won no medals, and Beattie was criticized for his tough coaching style. He stepped down as the U.S. Ski Team's coach in April 1969.

== Promotion and commentating ==
In 1966, Beattie co-founded the World Cup for alpine skiing. After stepping down as U.S. team coach in 1969, he founded the World Pro Ski Tour in 1970 and worked in promoting it, and became a NASTAR commissioner in 1970. ABC Sports hired him as a ski-racing commentator, where he was frequently paired with Frank Gifford, a former NFL running back. Beattie's television work included alpine commentary during ABC's coverage of four Winter Olympics in 1976, 1980, 1984, and 1988, and also covered volleyball at the 1984 Summer Olympics. He later worked as ABC's winter sports correspondent, which also involved non-alpine sports, and occasionally worked as an announcer for non-winter sports on ABC's Wide World of Sports program.

Beattie continued to manage the World Pro Ski Tour until 1982, and started hosting ESPN skiing programs in 1985.

He authored or co-authored three books, including My Ten Secrets of Skiing (Viking Press, NY; 1968) and Bob Beattie's Learn to Ski (Bantam Books, 1967).

He also played the announcer for the arm wrestling championship in the 1987 movie Over the Top.

== Honors ==
Beattie was given the AT&T Skiing Award in 1983. He was inducted into the National Ski Hall of Fame in 1984. He was inducted into the Colorado Ski and Snowboard Hall of Fame in 1986. He was the 1997 recipient of the International Ski Federation's Journalist Award.

== Personal life ==
Beattie had two children, Zeno and Susan, from his first marriage to Ann Dwinnell. His second marriage was to Olympic skier Kiki Cutter and lasted from 1971 to 1973. He married a third time in 1980, to Cheryl Britton, a manager of a local secondhand clothing store, and that marriage lasted until 1987. He was married to Marci Rose Beattie (née Cohen) until his death in 2018.

Beattie died on April 1, 2018, in Fruita, Colorado, from a long illness at the age of 85.
