= Maribor Pohorje Ski Resort =

Ski resort in Slovenia

Maribor Pohorje
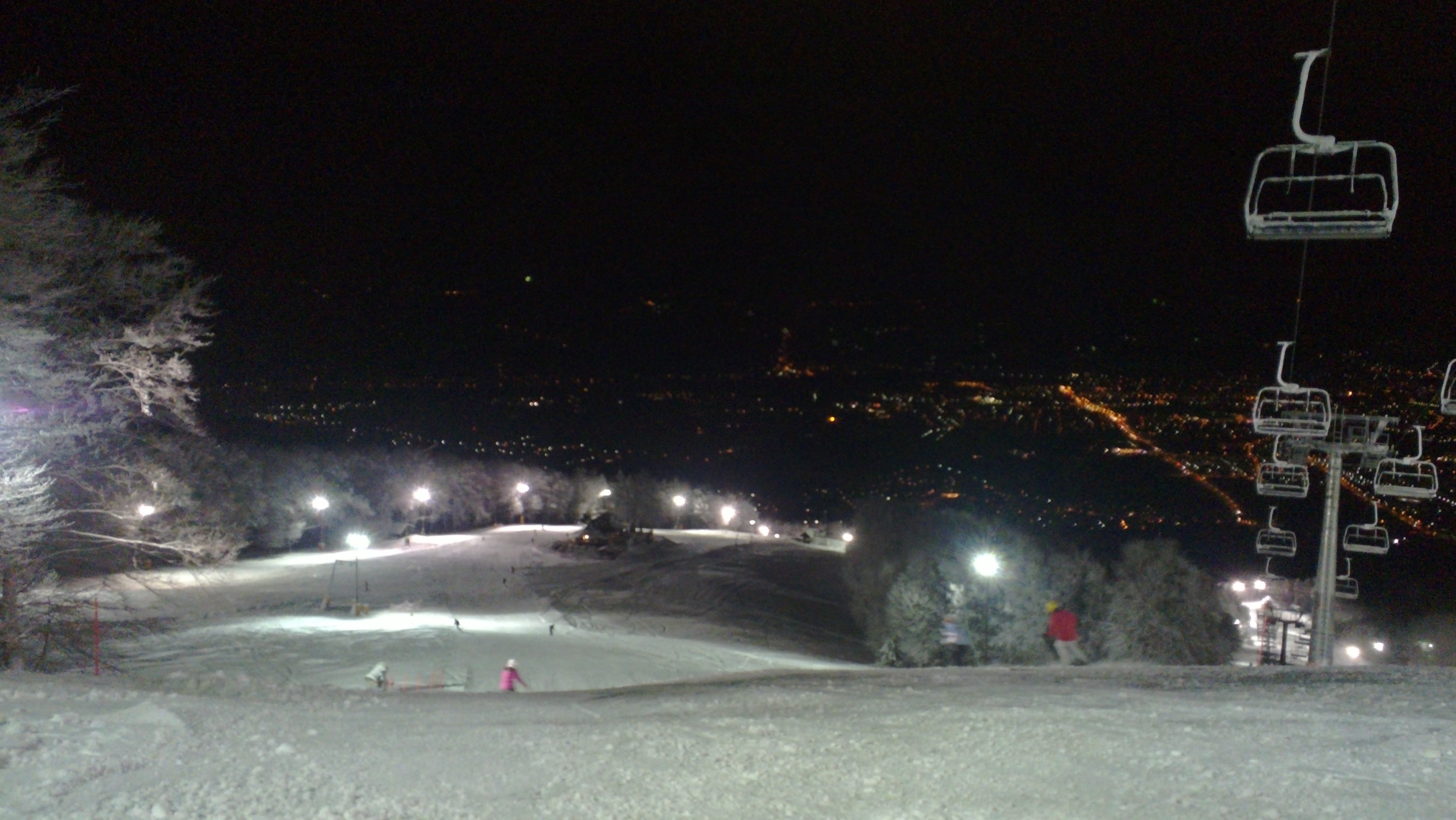
- Night skiing overlooking Maribor

- Location in the Slovenia
- Location: Hoče–Slivnica / Ruše / Maribor, Slovenia (Lower Styria, East Pohorje)
- Nearest city: Maribor (6 km); Graz (74 km); Trieste (222 km); Vienna (264 km); Venice (369 km); Zagreb (114 km); Budapest (345 km); Munich (488 km)
- Coordinates: 46.534°N 15.600°E
- Vertical: 1,002 m (3,287 ft)
- Top elevation: 1,327 m (4,354 ft)
- Base elevation: 325 m (1,066 ft)
- Skiable area: 250 ha (620 acres)
- Trails: 42 km (26 mi): 24 km (15 mi); 13 km (8.1 mi); 5 km (3.1 mi)
- Longest run: 4 km (2.5 mi)
- Lift system: 22 total 1 gondola 15 surface 3 doublechair 2 fourchair 1 sixchair
- Lift capacity: 22,300 / hr
- Snowmaking: 100% of area
- Night skiing: 10 km (6 mi)
- Website: visitpohorje.si/en/

Maribor Pohorje Ski Resort (Slovene: Smučišče Mariborsko Pohorje) is the largest ski resort in Slovenia, located just south of Maribor, at the mountain range of Pohorje in Lower Styria.

The resort consists of three sections: lower section "Snow Stadium," middle section "Bolfenk" and an upper section called "Areh". The resort as a whole offers 42 km (26 miles) of north-facing ski slopes, 27 km (17 mi) of cross-country skiing, and 10 km (6 mi) of night skiing. It is best known for its "Golden Fox" competition, women's World Cup races in giant slalom and slalom, held since 1964.

== Ski lifts ==
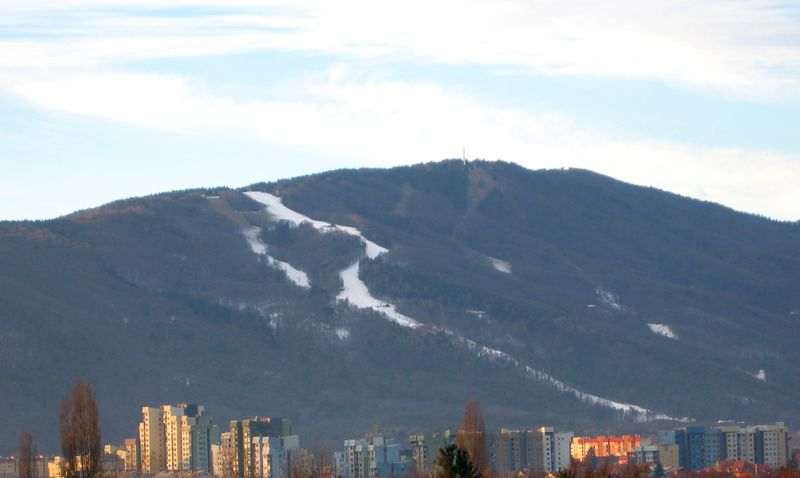
View of Pohorje from Maribor

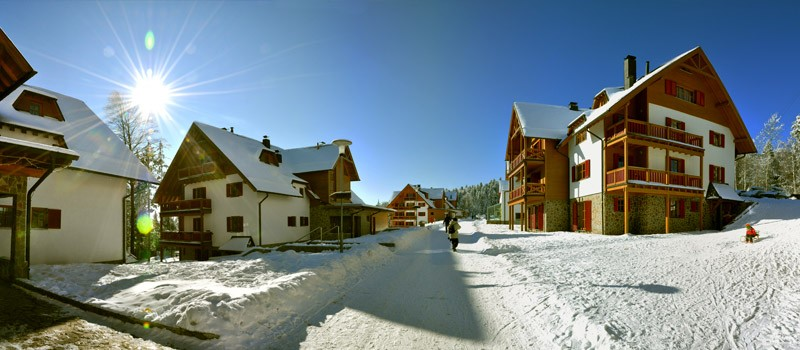
The tourist village of Bolfenk

=== Snow Stadium ===
- Lower section (325 m (1,066 ft) - 1,050 m (3,445 ft))

Slope	Length
Pohorska vzpenjača	2505 m
Radvanje	770 m
Poštela	1187 m
Sleme	1061 m
Mojca	830 m
Kekec	100 m
Cicibanček	187 m
Bellvue	250 m
Bolfenk	653 m
Habakuk	260 m

=== Bolfenk ===
- Middle section (937 m (3,074 ft) - 1,150 m (3,773 ft))

Slope	Length
Stolp	945 m
Videc	957 m
Partizanka 1	879 m
Partizanka 2	879 m

=== Areh ===
- Upper section (927 m (3,041 ft) - 1,327 m (4,354 ft))

Slope	Length
Pisker 2	1672 m
Ruška	1285 m
Orel	1285 m
Areh	408 m
Cojzerica 1	710 m
Cojzerica 2	710 m
Žigart	386 m
Vali	126 m
