= Lisi Pall =

Austrian alpine skier (born 1951)

Elisabeth "Lisi" Pall (born 15 February 1951 in Bischofshofen) is an Austrian former alpine skier who competed in the Women's giant slalom at the 1968 Winter Olympics, finishing 27th.
