= Helga María Sista =

Argentine alpine skier (born 1947)

Personal information
- Nationality: Argentine
- Born: 12 May 1947 (age 79) Munich, Germany

Sport
- Sport: Alpine skiing

Helga María Sista (born 12 May 1947) is an Argentine alpine skier. She competed in two events at the 1968 Winter Olympics.
