= Irina Turundayevskaya =

Soviet skier (born 1947)

Personal information
- Nationality: Soviet
- Born: 19 April 1947; Leningrad, Russian SFSR, Soviet Union
- Died: 29 April 2017 (aged 70)

Sport
- Sport: Alpine skiing

Irina Turundayevskaya (19 April 1947 – 29 April 2017) was a Soviet alpine skier. She competed in two events at the 1968 Winter Olympics.
