= Ana Sabine Naumann =

Argentine alpine skier (born 1947)

Personal information
- Born: 1 October 1947 (age 79) Ocdelsheim, Argentina

Sport
- Sport: Alpine skiing

Ana Sabine Naumann (born 1 October 1947) is an Argentine alpine skier. She competed in two events at the 1968 Winter Olympics.
