= Christl Hintermaier =

German alpine skier (born 1946)

Christa "Christl" Hintermaier (born 30 January 1946) is a German former alpine skier who competed in the 1968 Winter Olympics, finishing 16th in the women's slalom. From Bad Reichenhall, she was considered one of the best German skiers during her career. She won four silver and three bronze medals at the West German championships and also competed twice at the World Championships.
