= Verena Vogt =

Chilean alpine skier (born 1952)

Personal information
- Born: 15 August 1952 (age 74) Santiago, Chile

Sport
- Sport: Alpine skiing

Verena Vogt (born 15 August 1952) is a Chilean alpine skier. She competed in two events at the 1968 Winter Olympics.
