= Alfina Sukhanova =

Soviet alpine skier (born 1944)

Personal information
- Nationality: Soviet
- Born: 1 January 1944 (age 82) Novosibirsk, Russian SFSR, Soviet Union

Sport
- Sport: Alpine skiing

Alfina Sukhanova (born 1 January 1944) is a Soviet alpine skier. She competed in three events at the 1968 Winter Olympics.
