= Anna Mohrová =

Czech alpine skier (born 1944)

Personal information
- Nationality: Czech
- Born: 15 July 1944 (age 82) Prague, Protectorate of Bohemia and Moravia

Sport
- Sport: Alpine skiing

Anna Mohrová (born 15 July 1944) is a Czech alpine skier. She competed in three events at the 1968 Winter Olympics.
