= Christine Laprell =

German alpine skier (1950–2021)

Christine Laprell (6 May 1950 – 11 May 2021) was a German alpine skier who competed in the 1968 Winter Olympics. She was born in Munich, Bavaria, Germany.

== Olympic events ==
1968 Winter Olympics, competing for West Germany:

- Women's downhill – 24th place
- Women's giant slalom – 15th place
- Women's slalom – 10th place
