= Helen Jamieson =

British former alpine skier (born 1946)

Medal record
Commonwealth Winter Games
Silver medal – second place	1970 St Moritz	Women's Giant Slalom

Helen Jamieson (born 9 December 1946 in Dundee) is a British former alpine skier who competed in the 1968 Winter Olympics. She was educated at the High School of Dundee.
