= Gertrud Gabl =

Austrian alpine skier (1948–1976)

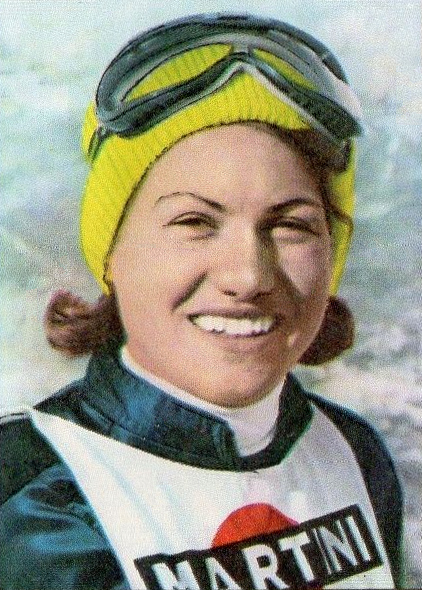
- Gertrud Gabl c. 1968

Personal information
- Born: 26 August 1948 St. Anton am Arlberg, Austria
- Died: 18 January 1976 (aged 27) St. Anton am Arlberg, Austria
- Height: 1.72 m (5 ft 8 in)

Skiing career
- Sport: Alpine skiing
- Retired: March 1972 (age 23)
- Disciplines: Downhill, giant slalom, slalom
- World Cup debut: January 1967 (age 18) inaugural season

World Cup
- Seasons: 6 – (1967-1972)
- Wins: 7 – (2 GS, 5 SL)
- Podiums: 17 – (7 GS, 10 SL)
- Overall titles: 1 – (1969)
- Discipline titles: 1 – (1 SL)

Gertrud Gabl (26 August 1948 – 18 January 1976) was an alpine skier from Austria. She competed in several events at the 1968 and 1972 Olympics with the best result of 9th place in the giant slalom in 1968.

Her best season was 1968/69, when she won the Alpine Skiing World Cup. Her uncle Franz Gabl was also an Olympic alpine skier.

In the 1968 Winter Olympics she was 9th in the giant slalom and 12th in the downhill; she didn't finish the slalom. In the FIS Alpine Skiing World Championships 1970 she was 4th in the slalom and 5th in the giant slalom.

In the World Cup she scored her first world cup points on 19 January 1967, when she finished fifth in the slalom at Schruns. Later she went on to win five slaloms and two giant slaloms.

Her father Josef was also an excellent ski racer.

She won the Overall Alpine Skiing World Cup in 1969, the same year as Karl Schranz did it for the men. Both of them came from the same village, St. Anton am Arlberg, and that is the only time that the women's and men's overall champions hailed from the same village.

== Death ==
On 18 January 1976 Gabl was skiing with two friends on the northern slope of Mount Gampberg at the ski resort of St. Anton am Arlberg in Austria, when an avalanche buried the three, and she was killed. Her two companions were rescued alive.

== World Cup results ==
=== Season titles ===
- 2 titles – (1 overall, 1 slalom)

Season
Season	Discipline
1969	Overall
1969	Slalom

=== Season standings ===
Season
Season	Age	Overall	Slalom	Giant; Slalom	Super G	Downhill	Combined
1967	18	18	11	19	not run	—	not run
1968	19	7	2nd place, silver medalist(s)	4	not run	—	not run
1969	20	1st place, gold medalist(s)	1st place, gold medalist(s)	3rd place, bronze medalist(s)	not run	19	not run
1970	21	16	15	13	not run	—	not run
1971	22	9	8	4	not run	—	not run
1972	23	19	12	19	not run	—	not run

=== Race victories ===
- 7 wins – (5 SL, 2 GS)
- 17 podiums – (10 SL, 7 GS)

Season
Season	Date	Location	Discipline
1968; 3 victories (2 SL, 1 GS)	11 January 1968	Grindelwald, Switzerland	Slalom
1968; 3 victories (2 SL, 1 GS)	5 April 1968	(United States) Heavenly Valley, USA	Giant slalom
1968; 3 victories (2 SL, 1 GS)	6 April 1968	(United States) Heavenly Valley, USA	Slalom
1969; 4 victories (3 SL, 1 GS)	4 January 1969	Oberstaufen, West Germany	Slalom
1969; 4 victories (3 SL, 1 GS)	7 January 1969	Grindelwald, Switzerland	Slalom
1969; 4 victories (3 SL, 1 GS)	16 February 1969	Vysoké Tatry, Czechoslovakia	Slalom
1969; 4 victories (3 SL, 1 GS)	17 February 1969	Vysoké Tatry, Czechoslovakia	Giant slalom

== World Championship results ==
Year
Year	Age	Slalom	Giant; Slalom	Super G	Downhill	Combined
1968	19	DNF	9	not run	12	—
1970	21	4	5	not run	—	—

== Olympic results ==
Year
Year	Age	Slalom	Giant; Slalom	Super G	Downhill	Combined
1968	19	DNF	9	not run	12	—
1972	23	DNF	DNF	not run	—	—
