= Judi Leinweber =

Canadian alpine skier (born 1950)

Judi Leinweber (born 13 June 1950) is a Canadian former alpine skier who competed in the 1968 Winter Olympics.
