= Kiki Cutter =

American alpine skier

Personal information
- Born: July 24, 1949 (age 77) Bend, Oregon, U.S.
- Height: 5 ft 3 in (1.60 m)

Skiing career
- Sport: Alpine skiing
- Club: Bend Skyliners
- Retired: February 1970 (age 20)
- Disciplines: Giant slalom, slalom, Downhill, combined
- World Cup debut: March 1967 (age 17)

Olympics
- Teams: 1 – (1968)
- Medals: 0

World Championships
- Teams: 2 – (1968, 1970) includes Olympics
- Medals: 0

World Cup
- Seasons: 3 – (1968–70)
- Wins: 5 – (4 SL, 1 GS)
- Podiums: 12 – (10 SL, 2 GS)
- Overall titles: 0 – (4th in 1969)
- Discipline titles: 0 – (2nd in SL, 1969)

Christina "Kiki" Cutter (born July 24, 1949) is a former World Cup alpine ski racer from the United States. She was the first American to win a World Cup event, a slalom race in Oslo, Norway, on February 25, 1968. Although Cutter competed on the World Cup circuit for less than three years, her five career victories led the U.S. alpine team for eleven years, surpassed by Phil Mahre in 1979.

== Early years ==
Born in central Oregon in Bend, Cutter learned to ski and race at Mount Bachelor, known as "Bachelor Butte" until 1983. She was one of six children of Dr. Robert Cutter and Jane Cutter, who relocated to Bend from the Midwest in 1948, and Kiki was the first in the family born in Oregon. Cutter was a junior racer at Mount Bachelor and gained recognition for her abilities; she won the U.S. junior downhill championship in 1967 at age 17.

== Racing career ==
Not originally on the World Cup or Olympic teams in 1968, Cutter, age 18, and Judy Nagel, age 16, were brought over to Europe in January, a few weeks ahead of the Olympics, to compete for berths on the U.S. Olympic team, which they both made. Cutter competed with the team at the Grenoble Olympics in 1968 and the World Championships in 1970. In the 1968 games, she placed higher than any American woman and was the only American woman to ski in all three events—slalom, giant slalom, and downhill. Following the Olympic competition, her rise to stardom continued in Norway, with her first World Cup victory at age 18. Cutter finished ninth in the overall standings in 1968. With three World Cup wins the next year (giant slalom at Oberstaufen, West Germany, and slalom victories at Mount St. Anne, Quebec, and Waterville Valley, New Hampshire), she finished fourth in the overall standings and second in slalom in 1969. Cutter won her fifth and final World Cup race at St. Gervais, France, in 1970. During her brief amateur career, Cutter had five World Cup victories, twelve podiums, and 25 top-10 finishes, all in the technical events, with one victory and two podiums in giant slalom and the rest in slalom. After the 1970 World Championships in mid-February, Cutter retired from international competition at age 20. She raced professionally on the women's Pro Tour in North America for several years.

== World Cup results ==
=== Season standings ===
Season	Age	Overall	Slalom	Giant Slalom	Downhill
1968	18	9	5	9	—
1969	19	4	2	6	—
1970	20	19	9	—	—

Points were only awarded for top ten finishes (see scoring system).

=== Race podiums ===
- 5 wins - (4 slalom, 1 giant slalom)
- 12 podiums - (10 slalom, 2 giant slalom)

Season	Date	Location	Discipline	Place
1968	25 Jan 1968	St. Gervais, France	Slalom	3rd
1968	24 Feb 1968	Oslo, Norway	Giant slalom	3rd
1968	25 Feb 1968	Oslo, Norway	Slalom	1st
1968	16 Mar 1968	(United States) Aspen, USA	Slalom	3rd
1968	28 Mar 1968	Rossland, Canada	Slalom	3rd
1969	3 Jan 1969	Oberstaufen, West Germany	Giant slalom	1st
1969	7 Jan 1969	Grindelwald, Switzerland	Slalom	3rd
1969	16 Jan 1969	Schruns, Austria	Slalom	3rd
1969	16 Feb 1969	Vysoké Tatry, Czechoslovakia	Slalom	2nd
1969	15 Mar 1969	Mont St. Anne, Canada	Slalom	1st
1969	22 Mar 1969	(United States) Waterville Valley, USA	Slalom	1st
1970	22 Jan 1970	St. Gervais, France	Slalom	1st

== Olympic results ==
Year	Age	Slalom	Giant slalom	Super-G	Downhill	Combined
1968	18	DQ1	21	not run	17	not run

== Personal life ==
From 1971 to 1973, Cutter was married to Bob Beattie, coach of the U.S. Ski Team and later skiing promoter and television commentator.

Cutter participated in two nationally televised women's Superstars competitions, where she placed third and fourth. She helped create the Kiki Cutter World Cup Ski Racing Scholarship in 1993 to help develop careers for youth ski racers. Cutter appeared in Bausch & Lomb advertisements for Ray-Ban sunglasses in the late 1980s.

She lives in Oregon, in her hometown of Bend, and is the founder, publisher, and president of Bend Living magazine.
