= Majda Ankele =

Slovenian alpine skier (born 1940)

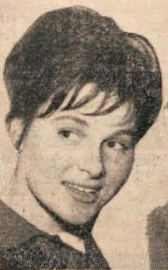
- Majda Ankele in 1968

Personal information
- Nationality: Slovenian
- Born: 6 October 1940 (age 86) Kranj, Yugoslavia

Sport
- Sport: Alpine skiing

Majda Ankele-Samaluk (born 6 October 1940) is a Slovenian alpine skier. She competed at the 1964 Winter Olympics and the 1968 Winter Olympics, representing Yugoslavia.
