= Vreni Inäbnit =

Swiss alpine skier (born 1948)

Vreni Inäbnit (born 31 March 1948) is a Swiss former alpine skier who competed in the 1968 Winter Olympics.

== Career ==
Inäbnit became the Swiss junior champion in slalom and combined in 1967. The next winter, she was named to the Swiss national team, where she remained until 1971. Inäbnit competed in the 1968 Winter Olympics in Grenoble, where she finished 17th in the slalom, 18th in the downhill, and 19th in the giant slalom, achieving placements in the midfield. Inäbnit's first World Cup points came the month after the Games.

A month after the Games, Inäbnit won her first World Cup points when she finished fifth in the downhill at Aspen on March 15, 1968. This also remained her best World Cup result. Two days later, however, she suffered knee injuries in a fall in the giant slalom, which resulted in an operation. In the next few years, she only finished in the World Cup points, i.e. in the top ten, once more, as eighth in the downhill at Pra-Loup on January 28, 1971.

Inäbnit celebrated her greatest successes at national level with two Swiss championship titles in the downhill in 1969 and 1971. In 1971, she also finished third in both the slalom and giant slalom, placing second in the combined behind Bernadette Zurbriggen. In addition, Inäbnit and other skiers from the Grindelwald Ski Club won the Swiss club championships in the slalom and combined in 1966 and 1969.
