= Burgl Färbinger =

German alpine skier (1945–2025)

Burgl Färbinger (10 October 1945 – 6 June 2025) was a German alpine skier who competed in the 1964 Winter Olympics and 1968 Winter Olympics. She was born in Oberau, Bavaria, Germany. She had been married to the luger Max Leo. She died on 6 June 2025, at the age of 80.

== Olympic events ==
1964 Winter Olympics, competing for United Team of Germany:

- Women's downhill – 12th place
- Women's giant slalom – 18th place
- Women's slalom – disqualified

1968 Winter Olympics, competing for West Germany:

- Women's downhill – 14th place
- Women's giant slalom – 10th place
- Women's slalom – 6th place
