= Felicity Field =

British alpine skier (born 1946)

Felicity Field (born 4 March 1946) is a British former alpine skier who competed in the 1968 Winter Olympics, where she finished 6th, in the Downhill event.
