= Annie Famose =

French former Alpine skier

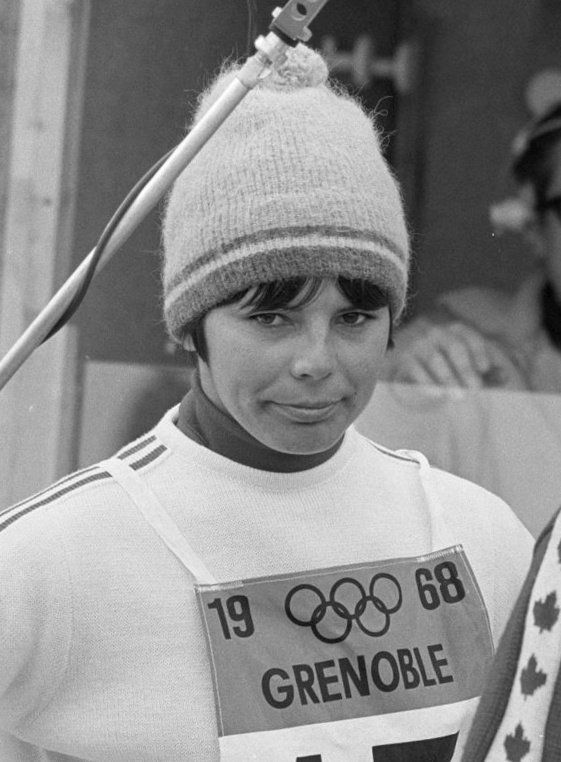
- Famose in 1968

Personal information
- Born: 16 June 1944 (age 82) Jurançon, France
- Height: 158 cm (5 ft 2 in)
- Weight: 50 kg (110 lb)

Sport
- Sport: Alpine skiing
- Club: Pyrenenees Quest
Medal record
Women's alpine skiing
Representing France
Olympic Games
Silver medal – second place	1968 Grenoble	Giant Slalom
Bronze medal – third place	1968 Grenoble	Slalom
World Championships
Gold medal – first place	1966 Portillo	Slalom
Silver medal – second place	1966 Portillo	Combined
Bronze medal – third place	1966 Portillo	Downhill
Bronze medal – third place	1968 Grenoble	Combined

Annie Famose (born 16 June 1944) is a French former Alpine skier. She was a member of the dominating French alpine skiing national team in the 1960s. She won two medals at the 1968 Winter Olympics in Grenoble, as well as three medals (including one gold in slalom) at the 1966 World Championships in Portillo, Chile.

Famose was a versatile all-event skier who was a threat to win races in any discipline, but she excelled in the slalom. She won two World Cup slalom races in 1967, and had a total of 24 podium (top 3) finishes in slalom, giant slalom, and downhill in her career. She won the slalom World Cup title in 1967 (tied with Marielle Goitschel), while placing third in the race for the overall title. She retired from competition after the 1972 season.

== World Cup victories ==
=== Season results ===
Season	Discipline
1967	Slalom

=== Individual races ===
Date	Location	Discipline
10 January 1967	(Switzerland) Grindelwald	Slalom
26 January 1967	(France) St. Gervais	Slalom
