= Marielle Goitschel =

French alpine skier

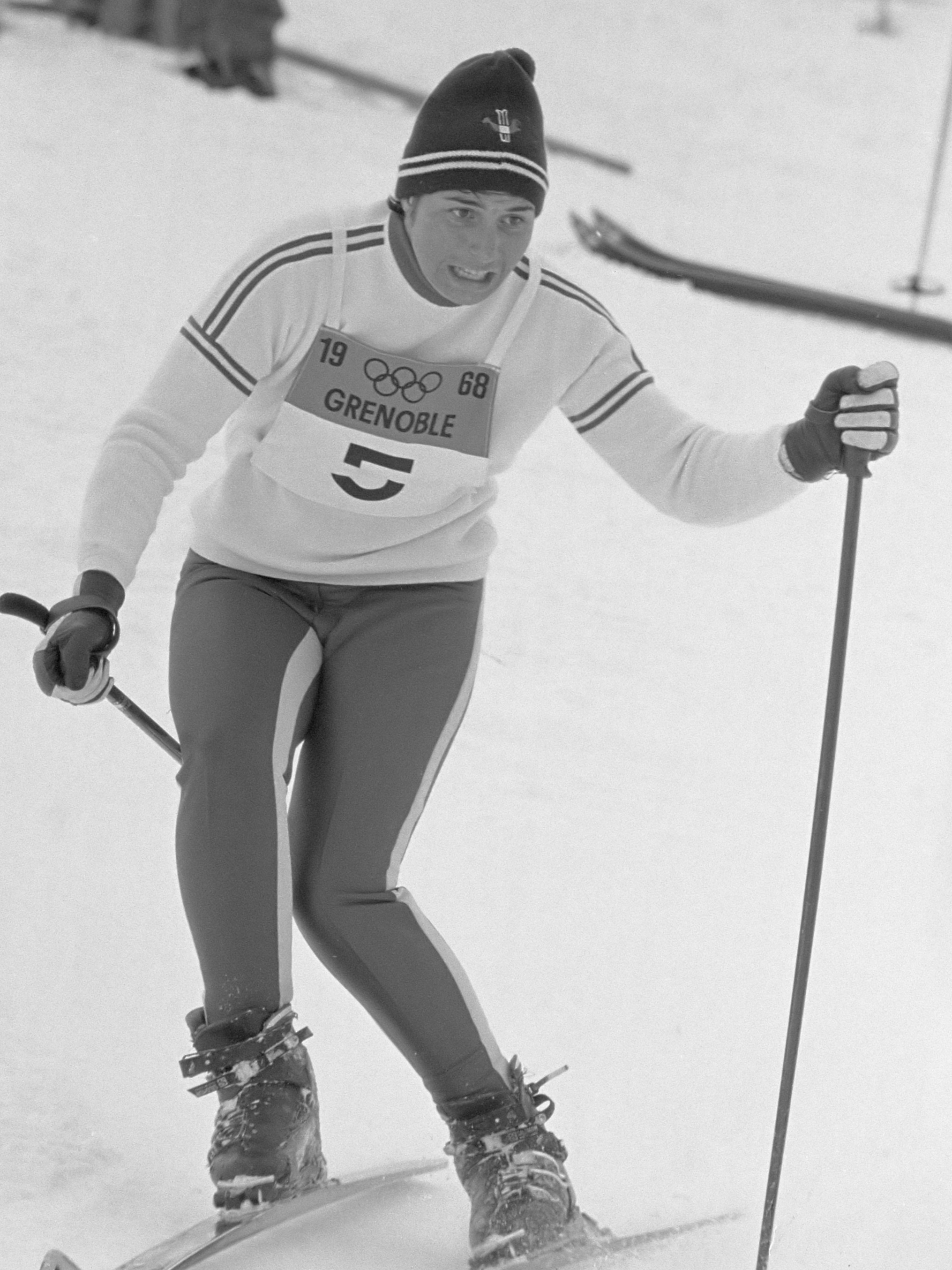
- Goitschel at the 1968 Winter Olympics

Personal information
- Full name: Micheline Françoise Marielle Goitschel
- Born: 28 September 1945 (age 80) Sainte-Maxime, Var, France
- Height: 169 cm (5 ft 7 in)
- Weight: 64 kg (141 lb)
Medal record
Women's alpine skiing
Representing France
Olympic Games
Gold medal – first place	1964 Innsbruck	Giant Slalom
Gold medal – first place	1968 Grenoble	Slalom
Silver medal – second place	1964 Innsbruck	Slalom
World Championships
Gold medal – first place	1962 Chamonix	Combined
Gold medal – first place	1964 Innsbruck	Combined
Gold medal – first place	1964 Innsbruck	Giant Slalom
Gold medal – first place	1966 Portillo	Combined
Gold medal – first place	1966 Portillo	Giant Slalom
Gold medal – first place	1966 Portillo	Downhill
Gold medal – first place	1968 Grenoble	Slalom
Silver medal – second place	1962 Chamonix	Slalom
Silver medal – second place	1964 Innsbruck	Slalom
Silver medal – second place	1966 Portillo	Slalom
Silver medal – second place	1968 Grenoble	Combined

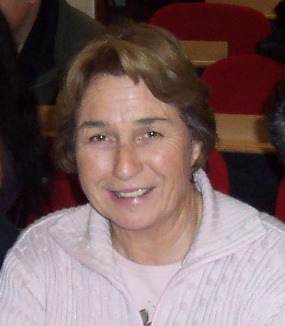
Goitschel in 2003

Micheline Françoise Marielle Goitschel (born 28 September 1945) is a French former alpine skier. Marielle is the younger sister of Christine Goitschel, another champion skier of the time, and the aunt of speed skier Philippe Goitschel.

After great success in the 1962 World Championships and 1964 Winter Olympics, winning 5 medals including 3 golds, Goitschel was considered the world's best female skier. She continued her domination at the 1966 World Championships in Portillo, Chile, winning medals in all 4 events, with 3 golds and one silver. When the alpine skiing World Cup debuted a few months after those championships in January 1967, Goitschel was expected to again dominate the circuit that season. However, she narrowly lost the overall title to Nancy Greene of Canada, but did take the discipline cup in downhill and tied for the win in slalom with her compatriot Annie Famose. During the next season, she again missed the overall title, finishing only 4th while repeating as slalom champion. She won her final gold medal in slalom at the 1968 Winter Olympics in Grenoble, and then retired from ski racing after that season. Goitschel's total of 11 World Championships medals in alpine skiing is second all-time among women to the 15 won by Christl Cranz of Germany (see the note below).

Marielle and sister Christine were the first ever female siblings on the same individual's event Olympic podium, winning the gold (Christine) and silver (Marielle) medals in the 1964 Olympic Women's slalom. They would repeat the feat two days later, switching their gold-silver order, in the 1964 Olympic Women's giant slalom.

== World Cup victories ==
=== Season results ===
Season	Discipline
1967	Downhill
1967	Slalom
1968	Slalom

=== Individual races ===
7 wins (5 slalom, 2 downhill)

Date	Location	Race
18 January 1967	(Austria) Schruns	Downhill
19 January 1967	(Austria) Schruns	Slalom
3 March 1967	(Italy) Sestriere	Downhill
12 March 1967	(United States) Franconia	Slalom
6 January 1968	(West Germany) Oberstaufen	Slalom
13 February 1968	(France) Grenoble	Slalom
28 March 1968	(Canada) Rossland	Slalom

== Notes ==
From 1948 to 1980, the alpine skiing events at the Winter Olympics also counted as the FIS Alpine World Ski Championships, so Goitschel's medals in 1964 and 1968 are double-counted in the list above (shown in both Olympics and World Championships). Separate World Championships medals were awarded each Olympic year (in 1948, not in 1952, and since 1956) in the combined using the results of the slalom and downhill. Also, for the only time in 1968, the results of the Olympic races counted for World Cup points, so Goitschel's slalom gold medal is also listed as a World Cup race win in the table above.
