= Gina Hathorn =

British alpine skier (born 1946)

Medal record
Commonwealth Winter Games
Gold medal – first place	1962 St Moritz	Woman's Slalom
Gold medal – first place	1962 St Moritz	Women's Combined
Silver medal – second place	1962 St Moritz	Women's Downhill
Gold medal – first place	1966 St Moritz	Women's Slalom

Georgina Melissa "Gina" Hathorn (born 6 July 1946) is a British former alpine skier who competed in the 1964 Winter Olympics and 1968 Winter Olympics, where she finished fourth in the Slalom, and in the 1972 Winter Olympics.
