= Wendy Allen (skier) =

American alpine skier (born 1944)

Wendy Irene Allen (born November 16, 1944) is an American former alpine skier who competed in the 1968 Winter Olympics.

== Life ==
Allen was born in Los Angeles in 1944. She competed in the slalom event at the 1967 US Championships and she was second. She also took second place at the Vail Alpine Holiday slalom in 1967. Allen took part in the 1968 Alpine Skiing World Cup which that year included the Olympics. She obtained a number of places including the bronze position at that event in Oslo in February 1968.
