= Nancy Greene Raine =

Canadian alpine skier and politician

The Honourable Nancy Greene Raine OC OBC OD
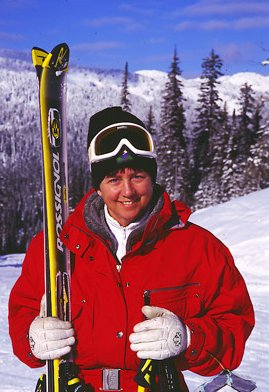

Canadian Senator from British Columbia
- In office 2 January 2009 – 11 May 2018
- Nominated by: Stephen Harper
- Appointed by: Michaëlle Jean

Personal details
- Born: Nancy Catherine Greene; 11 May 1943 (age 83) Ottawa, Ontario, Canada
- Party: Conservative
- Other political affiliations: Reform
- Spouse: Al Raine (m. 1969; died 2024)

Medal record

Women's alpine skiing

Representing Canada

Olympic Games
Gold medal – first place	1968 Grenoble	Giant slalom
Silver medal – second place	1968 Grenoble	Slalom

World Championships
Gold medal – first place	1968 Grenoble	Giant slalom
Gold medal – first place	1968 Grenoble	Combined
Silver medal – second place	1968 Grenoble	Slalom

Nancy Catherine Greene Raine OC OBC OD (born 11 May 1943) is a former Canadian Senator for British Columbia and an Olympic alpine champion voted as Canada's Female Athlete of the 20th Century. She was born in Ottawa, Ontario, Canada. Greene Raine won the giant slalom in the 1968 Winter Olympics in Grenoble, France.

After being appointed to the Senate in 2009, Greene Raine retired on 11 May 2018, when she reached the mandatory retirement age of 75.

She is the mother of retired alpine skier Willy Raine.

== Background ==
Greene was born on 11 May 1943, in Ottawa, Ontario. She moved with her family to Rossland, British Columbia, before she was three years of age. Rossland is a mountainous area and the site of the first ski competition ever held in Canada in 1897. Greene began schussing at a young age and while in high school she competed in the Canadian Junior Championships. She would go on to win 14 World Cup victories by 1968.

=== Career ===
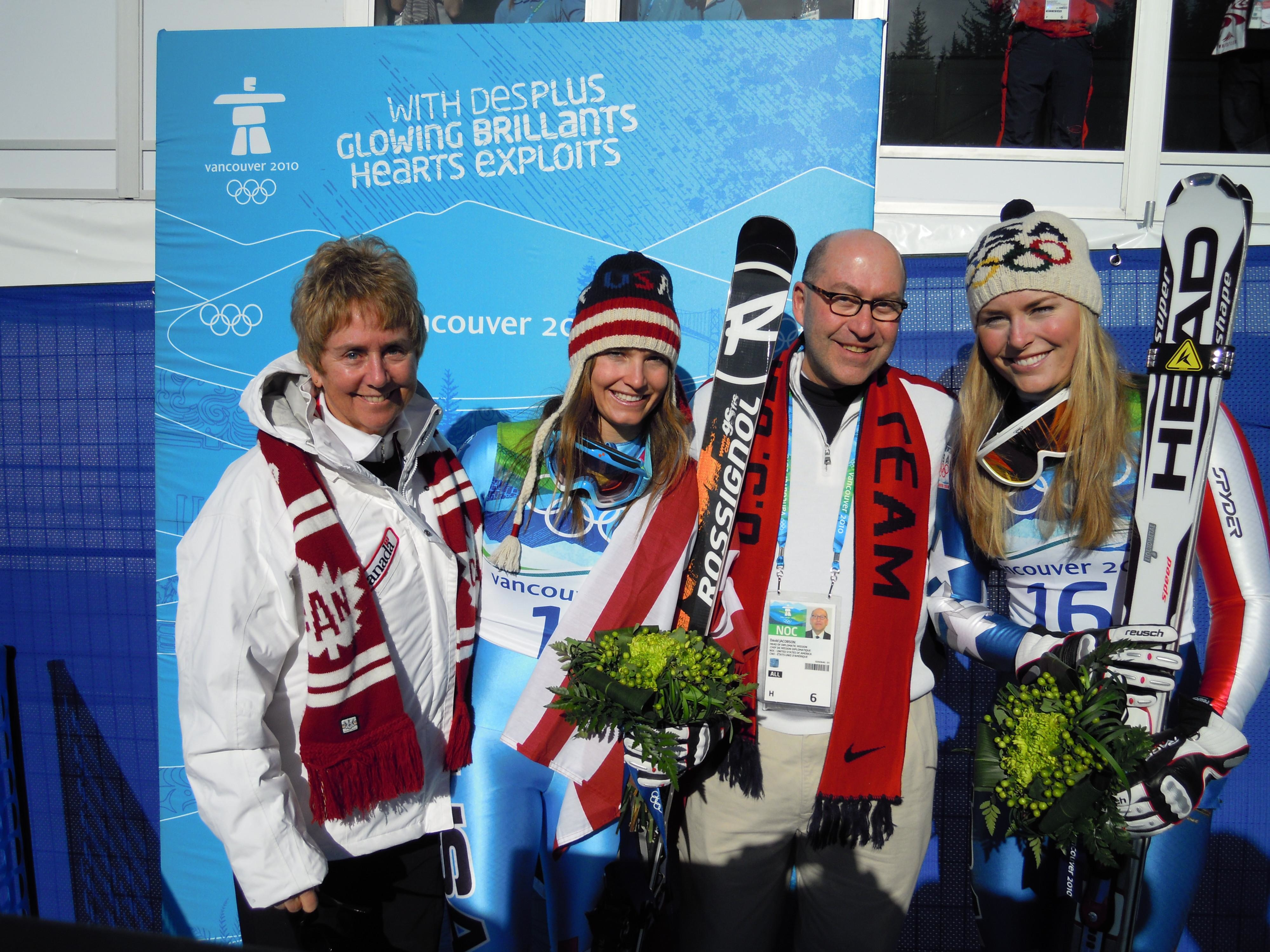
Nancy Greene (left) at the 2010 Winter Olympic Games

Nicknamed "Tiger" because of her "go for it" attitude and her aggressive style of skiing, she won 17 Canadian ski championship titles and the United States championship three times. In 1967, Greene broke the European domination of the sport, winning the inaugural World Cup. That year she won seven of 16 events, taking the over-all title with four giant slalom victories plus two in slalom and one in downhill. Her accomplishment earned her Canadian "Athlete of the Year" honours.

In 1968 she won the World Cup title again plus, at that year's Winter Olympic Games in Grenoble, France, she captured a gold medal in the giant slalom, by one of the largest margins in Olympic history, and a silver medal in the slalom. For the second time, she was named Canada's "Athlete of the Year".

Following her retirement from competition, she made a major contribution to Canadian sport by accepting an appointment to the federal government's "Task Force on Sport For Canadians". During this period Greene also did promotional work for various companies including Rossignol, Pontiac, and Mars Inc. In a 1970s television commercial for the latter product, she was seen to discard the wrapper onto a ski slope in the course of consuming the product. This minor act, coming at a time of nascent environmental sentiment, appears to have entered the public memory as references to it have dogged her over the years.

Married with twin boys and having built a cabin in Whistler in 1970, Greene and her husband Al Raine were instrumental in the early development of the Whistler-Blackcomb Resort in Whistler, British Columbia, and then later in the development and promotion of skiing at Sun Peaks Resort, just north of Kamloops. The expansion of the resort was not without controversy as some Native groups opposed the move, and protesters occupying the new site were removed by arrest under a provincial injunction.

Greene is the skiing ambassador at Sun Peaks Resort. She and her husband built Nancy Greene's Cahilty Lodge, where they make their home. Dedicated to the promotion of her sport for more than 30 years, the Nancy Greene Ski League has been an important entry-level race program for young children.

Over the years, Greene has been the recipient of numerous awards including her country's highest civilian honour, the Order of Canada. She has been honoured with the naming of "Nancy Greene Provincial Park" and "Nancy Greene Lake" in the Monashee Mountains of British Columbia's Kootenay region. A stretch of Capilano Road in North Vancouver was renamed Nancy Greene Way. In 1999, her name was engraved in Canada's Walk of Fame and she was voted Canada's female athlete of the century in a survey of newspaper editors and broadcasters conducted by The Canadian Press and Broadcast News.

In 1990, Greene and husband Al Raine were encouraged by the BC provincial government to pursue the development of a new ski resort in the Melvin Creek Valley, between Mount Currie and Lillooet, both predominantly Indigenous communities. Perhaps coincidentally, the rough road accessing the area was paved and upgraded at this time by the government as an extension to highway 99, the main road from Vancouver to Pemberton. Despite opposition from Indigenous groups, backcountry recreationists, biologists, and environmental organizations, the project received approval from BC's Environmental Assessment Office in 2000, but has been stalled in a series of protests and blockades since.

In 1993, Greene announced her support for the right-wing Reform Party of Canada.

In April 2005, Greene was named chancellor of Thompson Rivers University.

In 2006, Greene-Raine contributed a small part of one of her Olympic competition skis to the Six String Nation project. Part of that material now serves as the second reinforcing strip on the interior of Voyageur, the guitar at the heart of the project.

On 2 January 2009, Greene took her seat as a Conservative member of the Senate of Canada. After her 75th birthday, Greene retired as a senator.

She was named Olympic Ambassador for the 2010 Vancouver games. On 12 February 2010, Greene lit the Vancouver Olympic cauldron along with fellow Canadian sports icons Steve Nash, Rick Hansen, Catriona Le May Doan, and Wayne Gretzky.

== Major awards ==
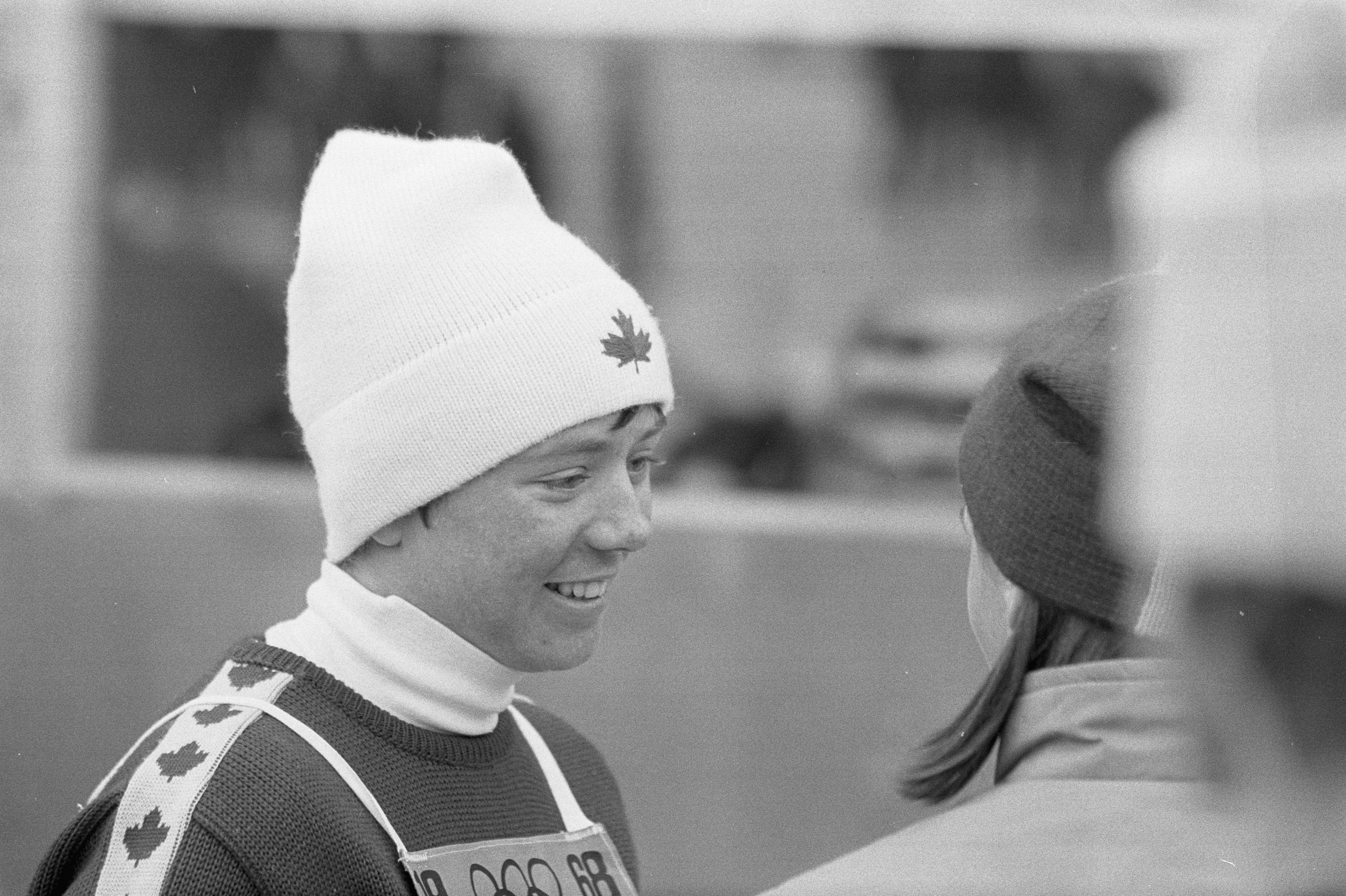
Nancy Greene (1968 Winter Olympics)

- National ski team member, 1959 to 1968
- Six-time Canadian champion
- Three-time United States champion
- World championship team member, 1962, 1966
- World Cup women's champion 1967, 1968
- Olympic team member, 1960, 1964, 1968
- 1968 Winter Olympics gold medal (Giant slalom) and silver medal (slalom)
- Coach of the Canadian National Ski Team, 1968 to 1973
- Officer of the Order of Canada (Canada’s highest civilian honour)
- Order of British Columbia (British Columbia's highest citizen award)
- Order of the Dogwood (British Columbia's highest civilian award)
- Lou Marsh Trophy as Canada's Outstanding Athlete of the Year, 1967, 1968
- Ottawa Key to the City, 1968
- B'nai B'rith woman of 1968
- British Columbia Sports Hall of Fame
- Canadian Sports Hall of Fame
- United States National Ski Hall of Fame
- Canada's Walk of Fame
- Canada's Female Athlete of the 20th Century
- Olympic torch relay 2010, Kamloops BC
- Queen Elizabeth II Diamond Jubilee Medal

== Skiing results ==
=== Olympic results ===
Year	Age	Slalom	Giant slalom	Super-G	Downhill	Combined
1960	16	31	26	not run	22	not run
1964	20	15	16	not run	7	not run
1968	24	2	1	not run	10	not run

=== World championship results ===
Year	Age	Slalom	Giant slalom	Super-G	Downhill	Combined
1960	16	31	26	not run	22	—
1962	18	30	18	not run	5	18
1964	20	15	16	not run	7	—
1966	23	DNF	4	not run	DNF	—
1968	24	2	1	not run	10	1

From 1948 through 1980, the Winter Olympics were also the World Championships for alpine skiing.
At the World Championships from 1954 through 1980, the combined was a "paper race" using the results of the three events (DH, GS, SL).
Normally held in February, the championships were in August in 1966.

== See also ==
- List of Canadian university leaders

Academic offices
New office	Chancellor of Thompson Rivers University; 2005–2010	Succeeded by Wally Oppal
Olympic Games
Preceded by Li Ning	Final Olympic torchbearer 2010 Vancouver; Served alongside: Catriona Le May Doan, Steve Nash, and Wayne Gretzky	Succeeded by Callum Airlie, Jordan Duckitt, Desiree Henry, Katie Kirk, Cameron MacRitchie, Aidan Reynolds, and Adelle Tracey
Preceded by Stefania Belmondo	Final Winter Olympic torchbearer 2010 Vancouver; Served alongside: Catriona Le May Doan, Steve Nash, and Wayne Gretzky	Succeeded by Irina Rodnina and Vladislav Tretiak
