= Isabelle Mir =

French alpine skier (born 1949)

Medal record

Women's alpine skiing

Representing France

Olympic Games
Silver medal – second place	1968 Grenoble	Downhill

World championship
Silver medal – second place	1970 Gröden	Downhill

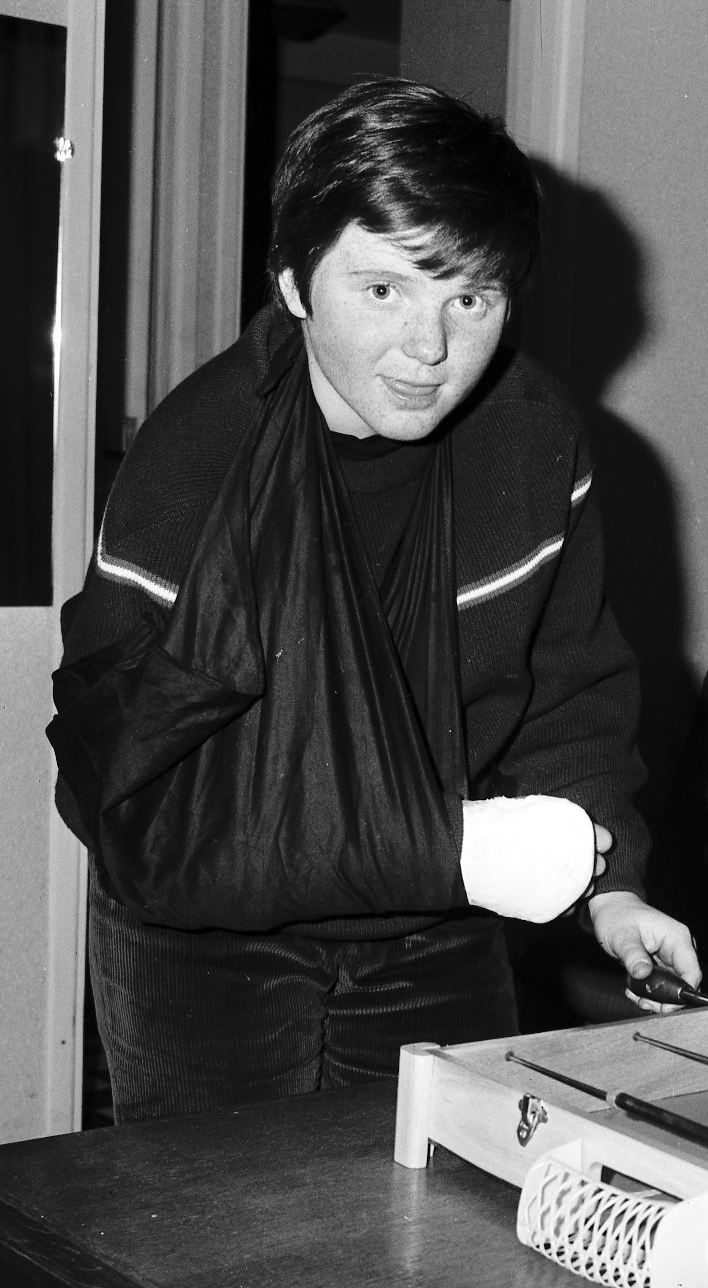

Isabelle Mir (born 2 March 1949) is a French former Alpine skier. At the 1968 Olympics in Grenoble Mir was silver medalist in the downhill. She received a silver medal at the FIS Alpine World Ski Championships 1970.

== World cup ==
Se won the women's downhill at the 1968 Alpine Skiing World Cup and at the 1970 Alpine Skiing World Cup, while she finished second at the 1967 Alpine Skiing World Cup and at the 1969 Alpine Skiing World Cup. She was second overall at the 1968 Alpine Skiing World Cup.
