= Florence Steurer =

French alpine skier (born 1949)

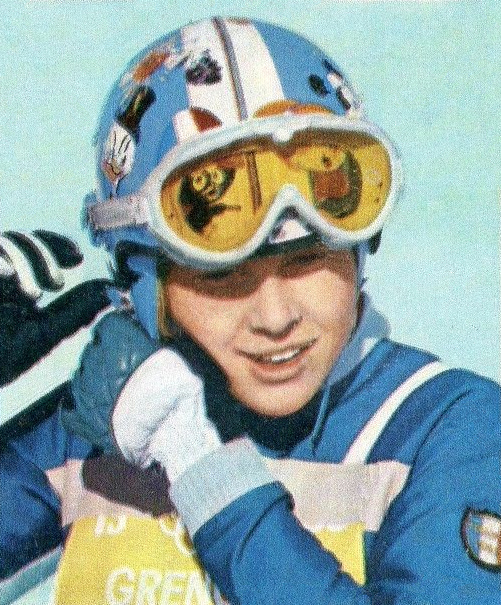
- Florence Steurer c. 1968

Personal information
- Born: 1 November 1949 (age 77) Lyon, France
- Height: 1.68 m (5 ft 6 in)
- Weight: 60 kg (132 lb)

Sport
- Sport: Alpine skiing
- Club: Lyonnais; SC Saint-Gervais
Medal record
Women's alpine skiing
Representing France
Olympic Games
Bronze medal – third place	1972 Sapporo	Slalom
World Championships
Silver medal – second place	1970 Gröden/Val Gardena	Combined
Silver medal – second place	1972 Sapporo	Combined
Bronze medal – third place	1966 Portillo	Giant slalom
Bronze medal – third place	1972 Sapporo	Slalom

Florence Steurer (later Penz, born 1 November 1949) is a French former alpine skier. She competed in the 1968 and 1972 Winter Olympics in the downhill, slalom, and giant slalom events and won a bronze medal in the slalom in 1972. She also finished fourth and sixth in the giant slalom, respectively.

Steurer also won two world championship medals; a silver in combined in 1970 and a bronze in giant slalom in 1966. She has 27 World Cup podiums, including six in downhill, seven in giant slalom, and 14 in slalom. This includes four victories – three in slalom and one in giant slalom. Overall, she finished second in 1969 and third in 1968 and 1970. After retiring from competitions, she became director of a communication agency Duodecim. In 2009, she was made a chevalier of the Legion of Honor. Her husband Alain Penz and father-in-law Claude Penz are also Olympic alpine skiers.
