= Olga Pall =

Austrian alpine skier (born 1947)

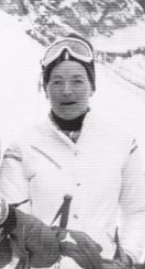
- Olga Pall in Val Gardena, Italy (1970)

Personal information
- Born: 3 December 1947 (age 78) Göstling an der Ybbs, Austria
- Height: 1.70 m (5 ft 7 in)
- Weight: 69 kg (152 lb)

Sport
- Sport: Alpine skiing
- Club: TS Innsbruck
Medal record
Representing Austria
Olympic Games
| Gold medal – first place | 1968 Grenoble | Downhill |

Olga Scartezzini-Pall (born 3 December 1947) is a former alpine skier from Austria. At the 1968 Winter Olympics of Grenoble she won the downhill event. In addition to the Olympic gold, Pall had two World Cup victories during her career, both in the downhill discipline.

Pall retired from competitions at the end of the 1969–70 season and later worked as a physiotherapist with the Austrian Olympic ski team at the 1980 and 1984 Olympics. Between 1990 and 2002 she acted as vice-president of the Austrian Ski Federation and then became its honorary president. Pall was selected as the Austrian Sportswoman of the Year in 1968, and in 1996 was awarded a gold medal for services to the country. She married Ernst Scartezzini, also an alpine skier and prominent skiing administrator.
