= Fernande Bochatay =

Swiss alpine skier (born 1946)

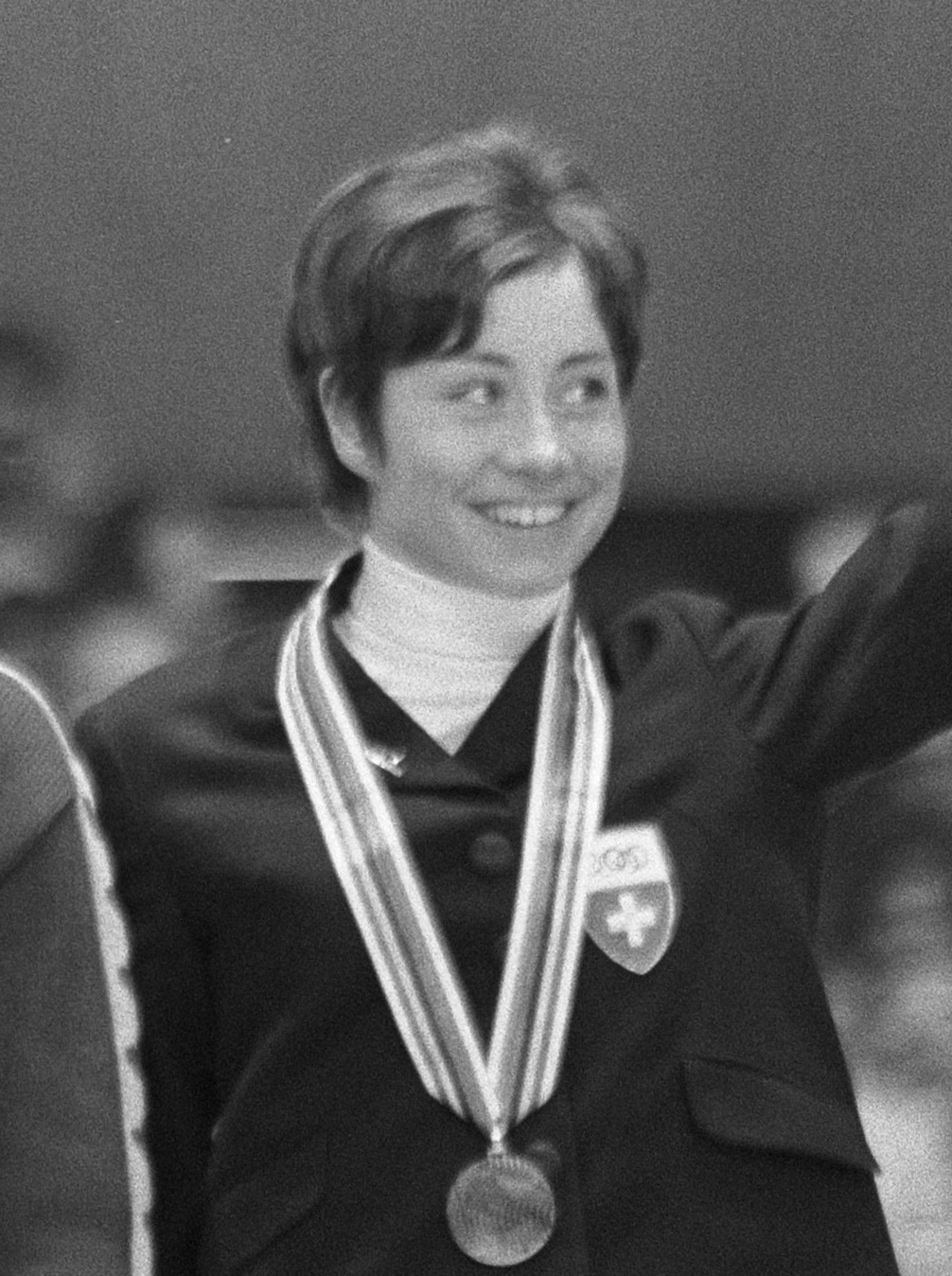
- Fernande Bochatay in 1968

Personal information
- Born: 23 January 1946 (age 80) Les Marécottes, Valais, Switzerland
- Height: 1.63 m (5 ft 4 in)
- Weight: 57 kg (126 lb)

Sport
- Sport: Alpine skiing
Medal record
Representing Switzerland
Winter Olympics
Bronze medal – third place	1968 Grenoble	Giant slalom

Fernande Bochatay (born 23 January 1946) is a former Swiss alpine skier. At the 1968 Winter Olympics, she won the bronze medal in Giant slalom.

Bochatay was the aunt of Swiss speed skier Nicolas Bochatay, who was killed on a training run at the 1992 Winter Olympics. She married in 1968 and next year retired from competitions. The year after she gave birth to her first child, and two more followed later. She was still skiing in her late sixties with her grandchildren.
