= Alpine skiing at the 1968 Winter Olympics =

Alpine skiing at the X Olympic Winter Games
- Venue: Chamrousse, Isère, France
- Dates: 9–17 February 1968
- No. of events: 6
- Competitors: 188 from 33 nations

Locations in France

Alpine skiing at the 1968 Winter Olympics consisted of six events, held 9–17 February at Chamrousse, southeast of Grenoble, France. Jean-Claude Killy of France won all three men's events, repeating Toni Sailer's triple-gold of 1956. Since Killy's feat, no male alpine ski racer has won three gold medals in a single Olympics. (Janica Kostelic later won three gold medals in the 2002 Winter Olympics).

This was the first Olympics with a two-run men's giant slalom, with one run per day. The women's giant slalom was one run until 1980.

For the only time, the results from Olympic races were included in the World Cup standings, then in its second season. Following the 1970 season, Olympic and World Championship results were not included in the World Cup points standings.

== Medal summary ==
Four nations won medals in alpine skiing and the host country led the medal table with eight. France won four gold, three silver and a bronze, as Jean-Claude Killy swept the three men's events. The top women's medalist was Canada's Nancy Greene, with one gold and one silver.

=== Medal table ===
Rank	Nation	Gold	Silver	Bronze	Total
1	France	4	3	1	8
2	Austria	1	1	3	5
3	Canada	1	1	0	2
4	Switzerland	0	1	2	3
Totals (4 entries)		6	6	6	18

=== Men's events ===
Event	Gold		Silver		Bronze	
Downhill	Jean-Claude Killy; France	1:59.85	Guy Périllat; France	1:59.93	Jean-Daniel Dätwyler; Switzerland	2:00.32
Giant slalom	Jean-Claude Killy; France	3:29.28	Willy Favre; Switzerland	3:31.50	Heinrich Messner; Austria	3:31.83
Slalom	Jean-Claude Killy; France	1:39.73	Herbert Huber; Austria	1:39.82	Alfred Matt; Austria	1:40.09

=== Women's events ===
Event	Gold		Silver		Bronze	
Downhill	Olga Pall; Austria	1:40.87	Isabelle Mir; France	1:41.33	Christl Haas; Austria	1:41.41
Giant slalom	Nancy Greene; Canada	1:51.97	Annie Famose; France	1:54.61	Fernande Bochatay; Switzerland	1:54.74
Slalom	Marielle Goitschel; France	1:25.86	Nancy Greene; Canada	1:26.15	Annie Famose; France	1:27.89

== Course information ==
Date	Race	Start Elevation	Finish Elevation	Vertical Drop	Course Length	Average Gradient
Thu 9-Feb	Downhill – men	2,252 m (7,388 ft)	1,412 m (4,633 ft)	840 m (2,756 ft)	2.890 km (1.796 mi)	29.1%
Fri 10-Feb	Downhill – women	2,252 m (7,388 ft)	1,650 m (5,413 ft)	602 m (1,975 ft)	2.160 km (1.342 mi)	27.9%
Sat 11-Feb	Giant slalom – men (1st run)	2,090 m (6,857 ft)	1,650 m (5,413 ft)	440 m (1,444 ft)	1.650 km (1.025 mi)	26.7%
Sun 12-Feb	Giant slalom – men (2nd run)	2,153 m (7,064 ft)	1,703 m (5,587 ft)	450 m (1,476 ft)	1.780 km (1.106 mi)	25.3%
Wed 15-Feb	Giant slalom – women	2,090 m (6,857 ft)	1,650 m (5,413 ft)	440 m (1,444 ft)	1.610 km (1.000 mi)	27.3%
Fri 17-Feb	Slalom – men (2 runs)	1,827 m (5,994 ft)	1,650 m (5,413 ft)	177 m (581 ft)	0.520 km (0.323 mi)	34.0%
Mon 13-Feb	Slalom – women (2 runs)	1,806 m (5,925 ft)	1,650 m (5,413 ft)	156 m (512 ft)	0.420 km (0.261 mi)	37.1%

== Participating nations ==
Thirty-three nations sent alpine skiers to compete in the events in Innsbruck. West and East Germany competed separately for the first time and Morocco made its Olympic alpine skiing debut. Below is a list of the competing nations; in parentheses are the number of national competitors.

- Argentina (5)
- Australia (1)
- Austria (13)
- Bulgaria (1)
- Canada (11)
- Chile (4)
- Czechoslovakia (3)
- Finland (2)
- France (11)
- East Germany (1)
- West Germany (13)
- Great Britain (10)
- Greece (2)
- Iceland (4)
- India (1)
- Iran (4)
- Italy (9)
- Japan (7)
- South Korea (1)
- Lebanon (3)
- Liechtenstein (6)
- Morocco (5)
- New Zealand (6)
- Norway (7)
- Poland (2)
- Romania (2)
- Soviet Union (7)
- Spain (6)
- Sweden (6)
- Switzerland (12)
- Turkey (7)
- United States (13)
- Yugoslavia (4)

== World championships ==
From 1948 through 1980, the alpine skiing events at the Winter Olympics also served as the World Championships, held every two years. With the addition of the giant slalom, the combined event was dropped for 1950 and 1952, but returned as a World Championship event in 1954 as a "paper race" which used the results from the three events. During the Olympics from 1956 through 1980, World Championship medals were awarded by the FIS for the combined event. The combined returned as a separate event at the World Championships in 1982 and at the Olympics in 1988.

=== Combined ===
Men's Combined

Medal	Athlete	Points	DH	GS	SL
1st place, gold medalist(s)	(France) Jean-Claude Killy (FRA)	0.00	1st place, gold medalist(s)	1st place, gold medalist(s)	1st place, gold medalist(s)
2nd place, silver medalist(s)	(Switzerland) Dumeng Giovanoli (SUI)	32.98	16	7	4
3rd place, bronze medalist(s)	(Austria) Heinrich Messner (AUT)	38.57	4	3rd place, bronze medalist(s)	14
4	(Poland) Andrzej Bachleda (POL)	54.45	26	13	6
5	(West Germany) Ludwig Leitner (FRG)	?	12	23	12
6	(Sweden) Rune Lindström (SWE)	66.98	29	16	11

- Downhill: 9 February, Giant slalom: 11–12 February, Slalom: 17 February

Women's Combined

Medal	Athlete	Points	DH	GS	SL
1st place, gold medalist(s)	(Canada) Nancy Greene (CAN)	16.31	10	1st place, gold medalist(s)	2nd place, silver medalist(s)
2nd place, silver medalist(s)	(France) Marielle Goitschel (FRA)	36.00	8	7	1st place, gold medalist(s)
3rd place, bronze medalist(s)	(France) Annie Famose (FRA)	36.19	5	2nd place, silver medalist(s)	3rd place, bronze medalist(s)
4	(France) Isabelle Mir (FRA)	40.75	2nd place, silver medalist(s)	6	5
5	(Austria) Olga Pall (AUT)	52.50	1st place, gold medalist(s)	5	9
6	(West Germany) Burgl Färbinger (FRG)	69.16	14	10	6

- Downhill: 10 February, Giant slalom: 15 February, Slalom: 13 February
