= List of museums in Vermont =

This list of museums in Vermont encompasses museums defined for this context as institutions (including nonprofit organizations, government entities, and private businesses) that collect and care for objects of cultural, artistic, scientific, or historical interest and make their collections or related exhibits available for public viewing. Museums that exist only in cyberspace (i.e., virtual museums) are not included.

For Wikipedia links to institutions similar to museums in Vermont, consult the "See also" section.

== The list ==
Name	Town/City	County	Area of study	Summary/Website
Abenaki Indian Museum			Native American	Rotating Abenaki museum that is displayed throughout the state, operated by the Ndakinna Cultural Center
Adam's Grist Mill Museum	Bellows Falls	Windham	Local history	Operated by the Bellows Falls Historical Society
American Museum of Fly Fishing	Manchester	Bennington	Sports	History of angling, including rods, reels, flies, tackle, art, photographs, manuscripts and books
American Precision Museum	Windsor	Windsor	Industry	Historically significant machine tools and techniques of precision manufacturing
Barnard Historical Society Museum	Barnard	Windsor	Local history	Located in the former village one-room school
Barre Museum	Barre	Washington	Local history	Part of the Aldrich Public Library
BCA Center	Burlington	Chittenden	Art	Operated by Burlington City Arts, contemporary art
Bennington Museum	Bennington	Bennington	Art	Decorative arts including Vermont-made furniture, Bennington pottery, glass, fine art by area artists, Grandma Moses paintings
Benson Museum	Benson	Rutland	Local history	
Ben's Mill	Barnet	Caledonia	Industry	Historic mill building with many past uses, includes woodworking shop and blacksmith forge
Bethel Historical Society Museum	Bethel	Windsor	Local history	
Bill Wilson House	East Dorset	Bennington	Biographical	Birthplace and living memorial of Alcoholics Anonymous co-founder Bill Wilson
Billings Farm and Museum	Woodstock	Windsor	Agriculture	working dairy farm, restored late 19th century period farmhouse, museum displays of cycle of rural life and work
Birds of Vermont Museum	Huntington	Chittenden	Natural history	Displays more than 475 biologically accurate woodcarvings of Vermont birds
Black River Academy Museum	Ludlow	Windsor	Local history	
Bradford Historical Society	Bradford	Orange	Local history	Located in the Woods Academy Building
Braintree Hill Meeting House	Braintree	Orange	Local history	Operated by the Braintree Historical Society
Brandon Museum at the Stephen A. Douglas Birthplace	Brandon	Rutland	History	Story of local antislavery movement in contrast to politics of native son Stephen A. Douglas, Democratic Party nominee for president in 1860. Other local history.
Brattleboro History Center	Brattleboro	Windham	Local history	Operated by the Brattleboro Historical Society
Brattleboro Museum and Art Center	Brattleboro	Windham	Art	Features changing exhibits by regional and international artists, located in a former train station
Bread and Puppet Museum	Glover	Orleans	Puppets	Puppets and masks from the Bread and Puppet Theater
Brick Schoolhouse Museum	Georgia	Franklin	History	Local history, operated by the Georgia Historical Society, also operates the Gordon's Mill Agricultural Museum
Cavendish Historical Society Museum	Cavendish	Windsor	Local history	Located in the former town hall
Chaffee Art Center	Rutland	Rutland	Art	Includes exhibit gallery
Chester Historical Society Museum	Chester	Windsor	Local history	
Children's Museum of the Northeast Kingdom	Saint Johnsbury	Caledonia	Art, History, and Culture	Local History, Art, Culture. Focus on children under the age of 8.https://www.cmnek.org
Chimney Point State Historic Site	Addison	Addison	History	Historic tavern, exhibits on area Abenaki, French and American Colonial settlers
Corinth Academy Museum	Corinth	Orange	Local history	Operated by the Corinth Historical Society
Corinth Agricultural and Trades Museum	Corinth	Orange	Agriculture	Operated by the Corinth Historical Society
Dorset Historical Society Museum	Dorset	Bennington	Local history	Area history, culture, marble industry, pottery, stencils
Dover History Center	Dover	Windham	Local history	Located in the 1820 Harris House and blacksmith shop, operated by the Dover Historical Society
Eaton Hall Museum	Pittsford	Rutland	Local history	Operated by the Pittsford Historical Society
ECHO, Leahy Center for Lake Champlain	Burlington	Chittenden	Multiple	Natural history, maritime history and ecology of Lake Champlain
Enosburgh Historical Society Museum	Enosburg Falls	Franklin	Local history	Operated by the Enosburgh Historical Society
Estey Organ Museum	Brattleboro	Windham	Organ Manufacturing	Preserving, displaying, and the work of the Estey Organ Co.
Ethan Allen Homestead Museum	Burlington	Chittenden	Historic house	Late 18th-century home Vermont's founder Ethan Allen
Eureka Schoolhouse	Springfield	Windsor	Education	Late 18th century one room schoolhouse
Fairbanks Museum and Planetarium	St. Johnsbury	Caledonia	Multiple	Natural history, regional history, ethnography, public planetarium
Fairfax Historical Society Museum	Fairfax	Franklin	Local history	Operated by the Fairfax Historical Society
Farrar-Mansur House	Weston	Windsor	Historic house	Mid 19th-century period house
First Congregational Church Museum	Berkshire	Franklin	Local history	Operated by the Berkshire Historical Society
Fleming Museum of Art	Burlington	Chittenden	Art, Anthropology	Part of the University of Vermont, art and artifacts from Ancient Egypt, Africa, Asia, Europe, and the Americas. 25,000 objects. Opened in 1931.
Franklin Historical Society Museum	Franklin	Franklin	Local history	Located in a late 19th-century log cabin
Garipay House	Hartford	Windsor	Historic house	Operated by the Hartford Historical Society
General Wait House	Waitsfield	Washington	Local history	Operated by the Waitsfield Historical Society
Goodrich Memorial Library	Newport	Orleans	Local history	Includes display cases and exhibits of local historical items, natural history displays and art
Goodwillie House Museum	Barnet	Caledonia	Local history	Operated by the Barnet Historical Society, open fall foliage weekends and by appointment
Gov. Jonas Galusha Homestead	Shaftsbury	Bennington	Local history	Operated by the Shaftsbury Historical Society, exhibits of local history in the 1783 house
Grafton Historical Society Museum	Grafton	Windham	Local history	
Green Mountain Perkins Academy	South Woodstock	Windsor	Education	19th-century private high school
Guilford Historical Society Museum	Guilford	Windham	Local history	Located in the old town hall
Halifax Historical Society Museum	Halifax	Windham	Local history	
Hall Art Foundation	Reading	Windsor	Museum of contemporary art and sculpture park	Converted from a former dairy farm and presenting rotating, temporary exhibitions of contemporary art, with outdoor sculptures installed throughout the grounds.
Hartland Historic Society Museum	Hartland	Windsor	Local history	
Hartness-Porter Museum of Amateur Telescope Making	Springfield	Windsor	Science	Collection of amateur telescopes, located in the historic Governor James Hartness Mansion, open during selected hours during the weekend of the annual Stellafane Convention
Helen Day Art Center	Stowe	Lamoille	Art	
Henry Sheldon Museum of Vermont History	Middlebury	Addison	Local history	Includes the early 19th-century Judd-Harris House with collections of 19th and 20th century Vermont furniture, paintings, and household objects, and the Walter Cerf Gallery with changing exhibits of art and area history
Higley House Museum	Castleton	Rutland	Local history	Operated by the Castleton Historical Society
Hildene	Manchester	Bennington	Historic house	Early 20th century summer mansion of Robert Todd Lincoln
Historical Society of Wilmington Museum	Wilmington	Windham	Local history	Located in the Barber House
Hubbardton Battlefield	Hubbardton	Rutland	Military	Visitor center exhibits about the Battle of Hubbardton in the American Revolutionary War
Hughes Barn Museum	Thetford	Orange	Local history	Operated by the Thetford Historical Society, artifacts of farming, trades and rural life in the 19th century
Hyde Log Cabin	Grand Isle	Grand Isle	Historic house	Late 18th century period log house
Isle La Motte Historical Society	Isle La Motte	Franklin	Local history	Includes 1840 schoolhouse, 19th-century blacksmith shop and 19th-century log cabin
John Strong Mansion Museum	Addison	Addison	Historic house	Late 18th-century brick home, operated by the Vermont Daughters of the American Revolution
Justin Smith Morrill Homestead	Strafford	Orange	Historic house	19th century home of United States Senator Justin Smith Morrill
Lake Champlain Maritime Museum	Vergennes	Addison	Maritime	Includes shipwrecks, boats, maritime artifacts
Lincoln Historical Society	Lincoln	Addison	Local history	18th-century farmhouse and 19th-century barn museum
Londonderry Arts & Historical Society	Londonderry	Windham	Local history	Located in the 1814 Rev. E. H. Newton House
Madsonian Museum of Industrial Design	Waitsfield	Washington	Design	website, design and manufactured objects
Main Street Museum	White River Junction	Windsor	Art	Eclectic display space for material culture and an experiment in a new taxonomy
Marlboro Historical Society Museum	Marlboro	Windham	Local history	Located in the Custer Sharp House
Marsh-Billings-Rockefeller National Historical Park	Woodstock	Windsor	Historic house	
Marvin Newton House	Brookfield	Orange	Local history	Operated by the Brookfield Historical Society
Middlebury College Museum of Art	Middlebury	Addison	Art	Includes antiquities, Asian art, and American and European painting and sculpture from the Renaissance through the 19th century
Middletown Springs Historical Society Museum	Middletown Springs	Rutland	Local history	Located in the Adams House on the Green
Miller Art Center	Springfield	Windsor	Multiple	Operated by the Springfield Art & Historical Society, local history, fine art, decorative arts, photos, clothing, dolls, military artifacts
Montshire Museum of Science	Norwich	Windsor	Science	Includes exhibits on anatomy, math, astronomy, mechanics, and natural history, trails and live animals
Mount Holly Community Historical Museum	Mount Holly	Rutland	Local history	Located in the Adams House on the Green
Mount Independence State Historic Site	Orwell	Addison	Military	Museum and American Revolutionary War archaeological site
Museum of the Creative Process	Manchester	Bennington	Sculpture, Modern Art, Painting	Includes exhibits on religion, psychology, creativity, and politics
The Museum of Everyday Life	Glover	Orleans	Art	website, eclectic collection of everyday objects
Nature Museum at Grafton	Grafton	Windham	Nature center	
New England Maple Museum	Rutland	Rutland	Food	
Norman Rockwell Exhibit	Arlington	Bennington	Art	Focuses on Norman Rockwell's art and years in Arlington from 1939 to 1953, framed magazine covers, ads, and illustrations
North Hero Historical Society Museum	North Hero	Franklin	Local history	Known as the "Hookenspoon", open seasonally on weekends
Northfield Historical Society Museum	Northfield	Washington	Local history	
Norwich Historic Society Museum	Norwich	Windsor	Local history	
Noyes House Museum	Morrisville	Lamoille	Historic house	Operated by the Morristown Historical Society, 19th-century life, includes furniture, textiles, military objects, clothing, photographs, pottery, folk and fine art, tools and objects of daily life
Old Constitution House	Windsor	Windsor	Historic house	18th century tavern, birthplace of the Vermont Republic and the Constitution of the State of Vermont
Old Mill Museum	Weston	Windsor	Mill	Early 20th-century period grinding mill
Old Stone House Museum	Brownington	Orleans	Open air	19th century life in northern Vermont, including furniture, textiles, photographs, pottery, folk and fine art, tools and utensils of daily life; includes six buildings on 55 acres in the Brownington Village Historic District, operated by the Orleans County Historical Society
Park-McCullough Historic House	North Bennington	Bennington	Historic house	Mid-19th-century mansion
Peacham Historical Association Museum	Peacham	Caledonia	Local history	Operated by the Peacham Historical Association
Poultney Historical Society	Poultney	Rutland	Local history	Includes an 1896 schoolhouse, Melodeon Factory and late 18th-century period Union Academy schoolhouse
President Calvin Coolidge State Historical Site	Plymouth	Windsor	Historic house	Early 20th century period family homestead of President Calvin Coolidge
President Chester A. Arthur State Historic Site	Fairfield	Franklin	Historic house	Reconstructed childhood home of President Chester A. Arthur
Randolph Historical Society Museum	Randolph	Orange	Local history	Located above the police station
Reading Historical Society Museum	Reading	Windsor	Local history	
Readsboro Historical Society Museum	Readsborol	Bennington	Local history	
Reverend Dan Foster House	Weathersfield	Windsor	Historic house	Operated by the Weathersfield Historical Society, 18th-century house with local historic items including Civil War memorabilia, a children's school room, tools, clothing and textiles
Richford Historical Society Museum	Richford	Franklin	Local history	Located in a 1908 firestation
Robert Frost Stone House Museum	Shaftsbury	Bennington	Historic house	Home of early 20th century poet Robert Frost
Rokeby Museum	Ferrisburgh	Addison	Historic house	18th-century house that served as a safe house along the Underground Railroad
Rupert Historical Society Museum	Rupert	Bennington	Local history	
Rutland Historical Society	Rutland	Rutland	Local history	Located in the 1860 Nickwackett Fire House
Saxtons River Historical Society Museum	Saxtons River	Windham	Local history	
Shelburne Farms	Shelburne	Chittenden	Multiple	National Historic Landmark, includes guided tours and seasonal art exhibits
Shelburne Museum	Shelburne	Chittenden	Multiple	Includes folk art, Americana, 1950s House, Impressionist and American paintings, quilts and textiles, decorative arts, furniture, 17th-to 20th-century artifacts, historic buildings, Ticonderoga (steamboat), decoys
Shores Memorial Museum	Lyndon	Caledonia	Local history	Operated by the Lyndon Historical Society
Shrewsbury Historical Society Museum	Cuttingsville	Rutland	Local history	website, open seasonally on Sunday afternoons
Southern Vermont Arts Center	Manchester	Bennington	Art	Includes the Elizabeth de C. Wilson Museum with 19th and 20th century works, including works by Luigi Lucioni, and a sculpture park
Southern Vermont Natural History Museum	Marlboro	Windham	Natural history	Includes animal mounts and live animals
St. Albans Museum	St. Albans	Franklin	Local history	Operated by the Saint Albans Historical Society
St. Johnsbury Athenaeum	St. Johnsbury	Caledonia	Art	Features American and European art
St. Johnsbury History & Heritage Center	St. Johnsbury	Caledonia	Local history	
Stowe Historical Society Museum	Stowe	Lamoille	Local history	
Sullivan Museum and History Center	Northfield	Washington	History	History of Norwich University
Swanton Railroad Depot Museum	Swanton	Franklin	Railroad	Operated by the Swanton Historical Society
T. W. Wood Gallery & Arts Center	Montpelier	Washington	Art	Features works of Thomas Waterman Wood and many of his artistic colleagues and contemporaries, and art from the state's Federal Art Project collection
Town House Museum	Sheffield	Caledonia	Local history	Operated by the Sheffield Historical Society
University of Vermont Natural History Museum	Burlington	Chittenden	Natural history	Includes the Pringle Herbarium and the Thompson Zoological Collections. Website
Vermont History Center	Barre	Washington	History	Operated by the Vermont Historical Society, changing exhibits of state and local city history
Vermont History Museum	Montpelier	Washington	History	Operated by the Vermont Historical Society, state history from 1600 to the present
Vermont Marble Museum	Proctor	Rutland	Industry	Contributions of Vermont marble and the Vermont Marble Company
Vermont International Museum of Contemporary Art + Design	Eden	Lamoille	Art	Contemporary art and design
Vermont National Guard Library and Museum	Colchester	Chittenden	Military	History of the Vermont National Guard, both Army and Air Force, and the military heritage of the State of Vermont and its veterans
Vermont Scale Museum	Weston	Windsor	Commodity	Located in the Vermont Country Store, collection of scales and measures
Vermont Ski and Snowboard Museum	Stowe	Lamoille	Sports	Vermont's skiing and snowboarding history
Vermont Toy Museum	White River Junction	Windsor	Toy	
Vernon Historians	Vernon	Windham	Local history	Located in a one-room schoolhouse
Waterbury Historical Society Museum	Waterbury	Washington	Local history	Located in the Waterbury Public Library
Westminster Historical Society Museum	Westminster	Windham	Local history	Located on the second floor of the town hall
Whitingham Historical Society Museum	Whitingham	Windham	Local history	
Williamstown Historical Society Museum	Williamstown	Orange	Local history	Open by appointment
Wilson Castle	Proctor	Rutland	Historic house	19th century estate
Windham County Historical Museum	Newfane	Windham	Local history	Operated by the Historical Society of Windham County
Winhall Museum	Winhall	Bennington	Local history	
Woodstock History Center	Woodstock	Windsor	Local history	Operated by the Woodstock Historical Society

== Defunct museums ==
- Cornish Colony Museum, Windsor, closed about 2010
- National Museum of the Morgan Horse, Shelburne
- Precision Valley Corvette Museum, Springfield, formerly part of the Springfield Diner

== See also ==
- Aquaria in Vermont (category)
- List of historical societies in Vermont
- Nature Centers in Vermont
