= Peter Miller (photographer) =

American photographer (1934–2023)

- Born: January 6, 1934; Manhattan, New York
- Died: April 17, 2023 (aged 89); Morrisville, Vermont
- Occupations: Photographer and writer

Peter Miller (January 6, 1934 – April 17, 2023) was an American photographer, writer, and publisher best known for his photographs of rural Americans.

== Early life and education ==
Miller was born on January 6, 1934, at Doctors Hospital in Manhattan. He spent his early life in New Jersey and Connecticut. After his parents divorced, his mother decided to move with him and his brother and sister to Weston, Vermont, where he soon found his love for hunting, fishing, and skiing. He graduated from Burr and Burton Academy in Manchester, Vermont. When he was a teenager, several rifles were stolen from his home in Weston and with the $160 in insurance money his mother gave him he bought a twin-lens reflex camera.

Miller spent much of his time afterward walking the fields around Weston where he met the local farmers. "I liked the farmers," he said. "They were the first people I met." He was self-taught as a photographer as there was no one around who was interested in photography except one man in Manchester Village, who had a studio where Miller often had his prints developed.

Miller received his B.A. in literature from the University of Toronto. While in Toronto, he became an apprentice for the photographer Yousuf Karsh. In 1954, Miller spent three months with Karsh in Europe photographing leading figures of the day, including Picasso, Albert Camus, Pablo Casals, and the future Pope John XXIII.

== Early career ==
After graduating in 1955, Miller enlisted in the U.S. Army and became a Signal Corps photographer. He was assigned to Paris where he photographed French and American generals, public relations stories, and crime scenes. When he completed his tour of duty in 1958, Miller worked in New York City as a reporter for Life magazine. As a reporter, he was not allowed to take photos while on assignment. However, the job gave him an opportunity to learn how to write and how a magazine was put together. He left the job in 1964.

== Photographer, publisher and author ==
An avid skier, in 1964 Miller returned to Vermont to start his own ski magazine, Vermont Skiing, which he edited until 1968. From 1969 to 1990, he was a contributing editor and photographer for Ski magazine, based in New York City. In 1981, he also worked as a freelance photographer and writer and became a stock photographer for the Image Bank, Iconica, and photo stock agencies in Europe and Asia.

In 1990, Miller returned to Vermont and established Silver Print Press to publish his photographs of rural Vermonters. He founded the press with his own money after mortgaging his house to do so as he could not find a publisher. Vermont People, People of the Great Plains, Vermont Farm Women, Vermont Gathering Places, A Lifetime of Vermont People, and Vanishing Vermonters were all published by Silver Print Press.

Miller also ghosted and provided photographs for Larry Benoit's book How to Bag the Biggest Buck of Your Life, about tracking. In 2008, he published Nothing Hardly Ever Happens in Colbyville, Vermont is an anthology of 27 stories written or edited by Miller about his hometown of Colbyville and nearby Stowe.

Following publication of Vermont Farm Women, Miller set up the Vermont Farm Women's Fund and donated part of the proceeds from the sale of his book to the fund. In 2006 he was the first author and photographer to be named Vermonter of the Year by the Burlington Free Press and the Vermont state legislature. Vermont Senator Patrick Leahy gave a speech on the Senate floor about Peter Miller's work documenting over a half a century of rural Vermont. His photographs have been exhibited in one-man shows in New York, Oklahoma, Paris, and Tokyo, He sold work from his gallery in his 160-year-old farmhouse in Colbyville, Vermont and his website.

When he turned 80 years old in 2014, Miller turned his home into an Airbnb and needed to use the local food pantry. He expressed frustration that Vermont had become unaffordable for himself, his friends, and neighbors. In a 2014 editorial in the Vermont Digger, he stated that he and other "self-employed Vermonters grumble but we have carried on and every so often we remember that we live in beauty. That's the Vermont Way and I think it is coming to an end."

Miller died of pneumonia on April 17, 2023, at Copley Hospital in Morrisville.

Miller's work is held in a trust run by his two friends: Rob Hunter, the former executive director of the Frog Hollow Vermont Craft Gallery and Ed French, an attorney based in Stowe.

== Awards ==
In 1994, Miller received the Lifetime Achievement Award in Ski Journalism from the International Skiing History Association. In 2003, Vermont Farm Women won the Independent Publisher's Award in the Women's Issues category. In 2006, he was named Vermonter of the Year by the Vermont State Legislature. In 2014, the New England Society of New York named A Lifetime of Vermont People the best New England photo and art book of the year. In 2017, he was awarded the Paul Robbins Journalism Award for ski writing and photography from the Vermont Ski and Snowboard Museum.

== Publications ==
- The 30,000 Mile Ski Race (Dial Press, 1973)
- The Skier's Almanac (Nick Lyons Press and Doubleday, 1980)
- The Photographer's Almanac (Little Brown, 1982) 0316573647
- Vermont People (Silver Print Press, 1990)
- People of the Great Plains (Silver Print Press, 1996)
- The First Time I Saw Paris (Times Books/Random House, 1999). Published in France as Paris Perdu et Retrouvé, Photographies et souvenirs de la Ville Lumière (Paris, 2001)
- Vermont Farm Women (Silver Print Press, 2002)
- Vermont People (Silver Print Press. Revised edition, 2003)
- Vermont Gathering Places (Silver Print Press, 2005)
- Nothing Hardly Ever Happens in Colbyville, Vermont: And Other Stories and Essays (Silver Print Press, 2008; OCLC 733981927.
- A Lifetime of Vermont People (Silver Print Press, 2013)
- Vanishing Vermonters: Loss of a Rural Culture (Silver Print Press, 2017)
