= Terrible =

Terrible, The Terrible, Le Terrible or El Terrible may refer to:

== Ships ==
- HMS Terrible, eight British Royal Navy ships
- French ship Le Terrible, sixteen ships of the French Navy
- Terrible-class ship of the line, a French Navy class during the Napoleonic era
- The Terrible, the ship used by privateer William Death in 1756

== People ==
- List of people known as the Terrible
- Terrible, ring name of Mexican professional wrestler Damián Gutiérrez Hernández (born 1976)
- El Terrible, nickname of Mexican boxer Érik Morales (born 1976)

== Places ==
- Terrible Mountain (disambiguation), a list of peaks known as Terrible Mountain or Mount Terrible
- Mont Terri, a mountain in Switzerland, known as Mont Terrible during Napoleonic times
- Launceston Castle, Cornwall, England, known in the 16th century as Castle Terrible

== Entertainment ==
- "Terrible", a 1995 CD by Terry Adams
- "Terrible", a 2022 song by Teenage Joans
- Terrible, the nickname of DC Comics character Dan Turpin
- Dr. Terrible, presenter of the 2001 British anthology TV series Dr. Terrible's House of Horrible

== Hotels and casinos ==
- Terrible's Hotel & Casino, Jean, Nevada
- Terrible's Hotel & Casino, Paradise, Nevada, now the Silver Sevens

== Other ==
- "Terrible" Tommy Ellis (born 1947), NASCAR driver in the 1960s and '70s
- Ted Lindsay (born 1925), Canadian retired National Hockey League player often called "Terrible Ted"
- Tommy O'Connor (criminal) (c. 1880-1951?), American gangster known as "Terrible Tommy"

== See also ==
- Terribile (disambiguation)
