= Vrest Orton =

American writer and businessman

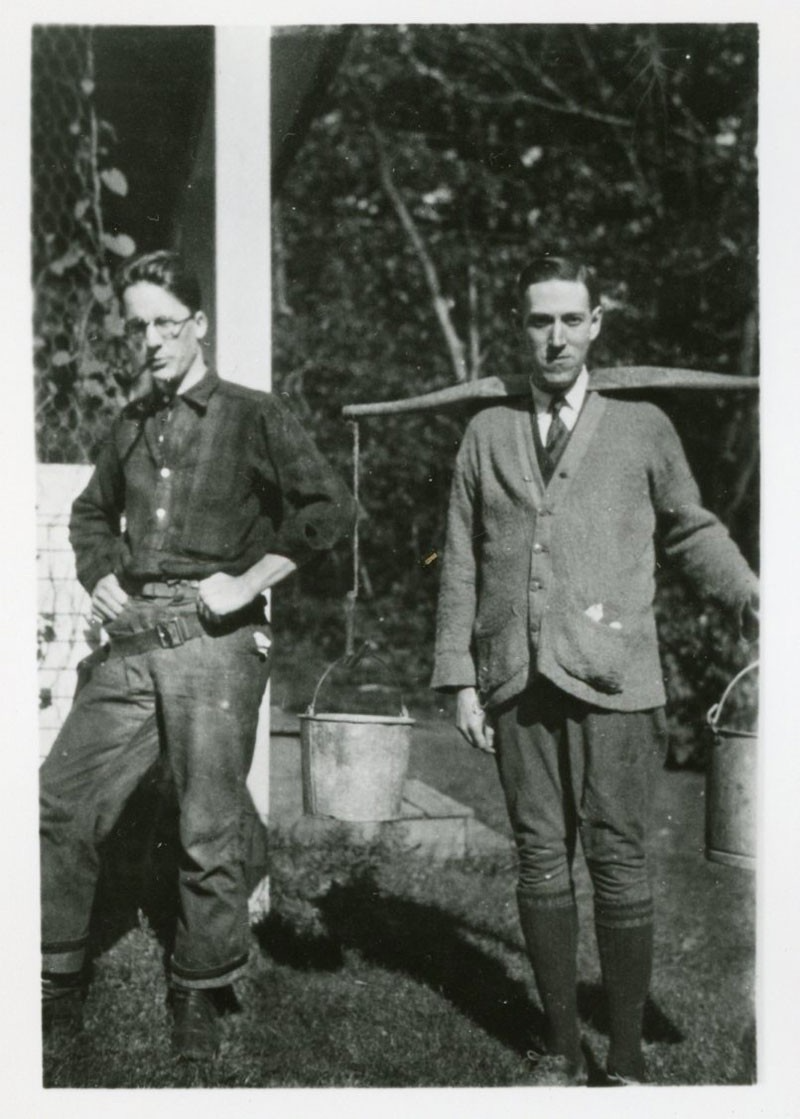
- Orton with H. P. Lovecraft in 1928
- Born: August 20, 1897 Hardwick, Vermont, U.S.
- Died: December 2, 1986 (aged 89) Springfield Hospital, Vermont, U.S.
- Education: Harvard University; Brown University
- Spouse: Mildred Ellen Orton (m. 1936)

Kenneth Vrest Orton (September 3, 1897 – December 2, 1986) was a writer and businessman who co-founded the Vermont Country Store with his wife, Mildred Ellen Orton.

== Life ==
Orton was born to and on September 3, 1897, in Hardwick, Vermont. His family later moved to his grandfather's residence in North Calais. There, he participated in his grandfather's business. He served as a Medical Corps sergeant in France during World War I.

In 1925, he moved to New York, where he came into contact with H. L. Mencken's American Mercury Magazine, and he worked as a publicist. Over the course of the 1920s and 1930s, he became friends with several authors, including Theodore Dreiser, Sinclair Lewis, and Robert Frost. In the early 1920s, he went to Harvard University and Brown University. During the 1920s, he developed a friendship with the writer H. P. Lovecraft, and joined a literary circle, the Kalem Club. By this time, he had come to dislike New York. He invited Lovecraft to his family farm in 1928. He wished to return to Vermont, and convinced Lovecraft to join him in his trip. They performed manual labor, and met with other writers. Orton also wrote an article in the Brattleboro Reformer about Lovecraft. In 1936, he married Mildred Ellen Orton. In the 1930s, he settled in Weston, Vermont, where he wrote articles and essays for local newspapers. During World War II, he served in a public relations capacity. In 1946, he bought a former country inn and co-founded the Vermont Country Store with his wife on the property. This store serves as both a specialty store and a repository for historical documents and objects related to Vermont. He expressed conservative political views. He died on December 2, 1986, in Springfield Hospital.

== Sources ==
- Durgin, Cyrus (1951-08-03). "Vrest Orton's Place in 'Republic of Vermont'". The Boston Globe. p. 15. ISSN 0743-1791.
- Hevesi, Dennis (2010-05-16). "Mildred E. Orton, a Founder of Vermont Country Store, Is Dead at 99". The New York Times. ISSN 0362-4331. Archived from the original on 2021-09-06.
- Kirk, Russell (1971-02-01). "Storekeeper 'Raises Up' Robert Frost". Orlando Sentinel. p. 14. ISSN 0744-6055.
- Joshi, S. T. (2001). A Dreamer and a Visionary: H. P. Lovecraft in His Time. Liverpool Science Fiction Texts and Studies. Vol. 26 (First ed.). Liverpool University Press. ISBN 978-1-84631-299-1. JSTOR j.ctt5vjhg7. OCLC 276177497.
- McDowell, Edwin (1986-12-05). "VREST ORTON, 89, FOUNDER OF STORE". The New York Times. p. 20. ISSN 0362-4331. Archived from the original on 2021-09-06.
- "Orton". Brattleboro Reformer. 1986-12-04. p. 10. ISSN 2473-4268. Archived from the original on 2021-09-06 – via Newspapers.com.
- Orton, Vrest (1928-06-16). "A Weird Writer is in Our Midst". Brattleboro Reformer. p. 2. ISSN 2473-4268. Archived from the original on 2021-09-13 – via Newspapers.com.
- Resch, Tyler; Barry, William (1962-07-14). "Two Characters Who Make Weston a Lively Resort Town". Bennington Banner. p. 5. ISSN 2331-6640. Archived from the original on 2021-09-06 – via Newspapers.com.
- Taylor, Tim (1980-09-21). "Vrest Orton: 'Crotchety' Conservative of Weston". Rutland Daily Herald. p. 17. ISSN 2166-1987. Archived from the original on 2021-09-06 – via Newspapers.com.
- "The Poets Meet". Brattleboro Reformer. 1928-06-22. p. 2. ISSN 2473-4268.
- "Vrest Orton Dies at 89; Was a 'Shrewd Entrepreneur'". Brattleboro Reformer. 1986-12-04. p. 1. ISSN 2473-4268. Archived from the original on 2021-09-06 – via Newspapers.com.
