= Terrible Mountain =

Terrible Mountain or Mount Terrible may refer to:

- Terrible Mountain (Colorado)
- Terrible Mountain (Vermont)
- Mount Terrible (New South Wales), a mountain within the Great Dividing Range, in the Snowy Mountains region of New South Wales, Australia
- Mount Terrible (Victoria), a mountain within the Great Dividing Range, Victoria, Australia

== See also ==
- Mont Terri, Switzerland, known as Mont Terrible during Napoleonic times
- Mont-Terrible, a department of Napoleonic France, named after the mountain
