= John Wilder House =

Historic house in Vermont, United States

- U.S. National Register of Historic Places
- U.S. Historic district – Contributing property
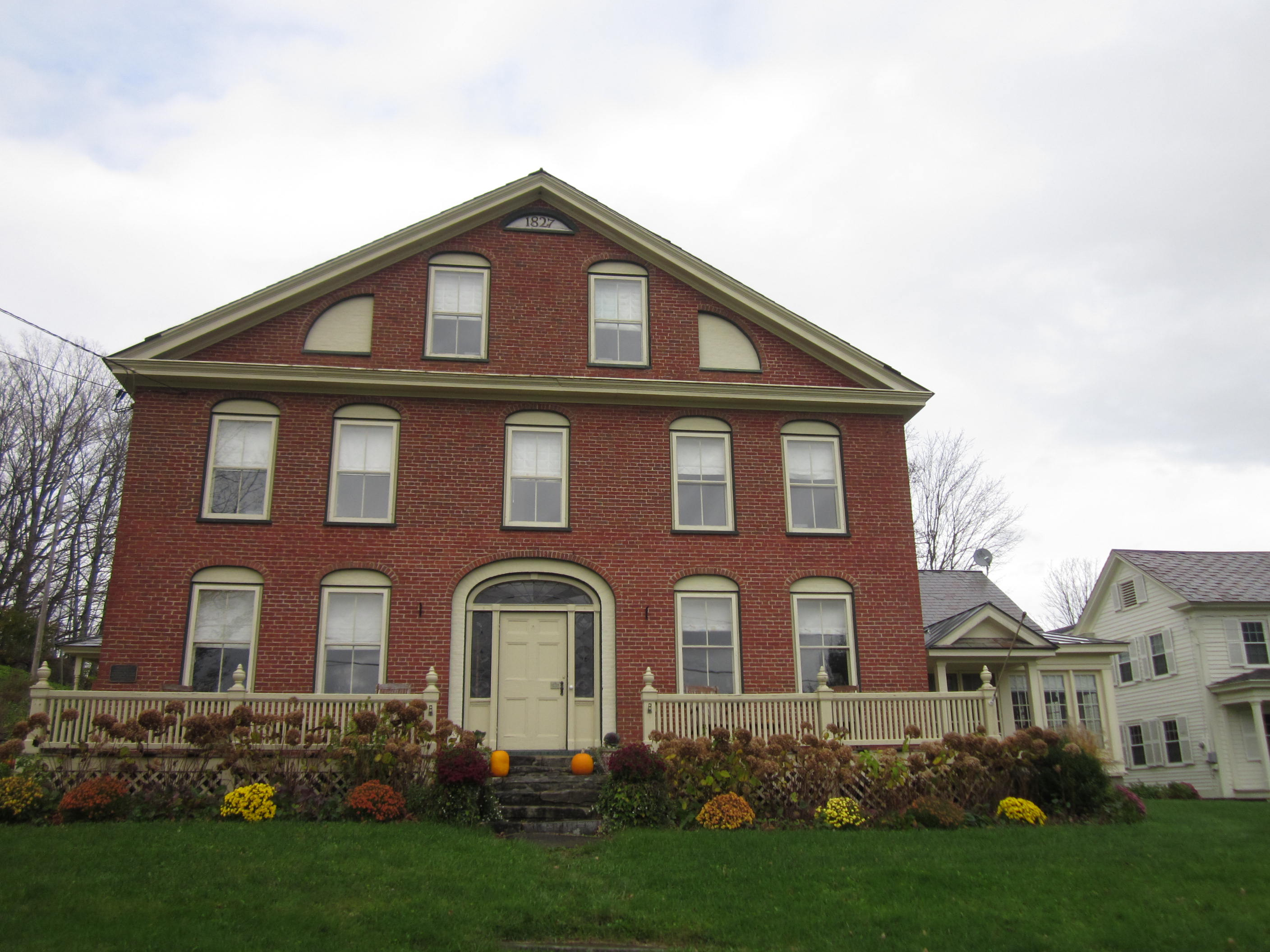

- Location within Vermont Location within the United States
- Location: Lawrence Hill Rd., Weston, Vermont
- Coordinates: 43°17′32″N 72°47′43″W
- Area: 0.6 acres (0.24 ha)
- Built: 1827
- Architectural style: Federal
- Part of: Weston Village Historic District (ID85001934)
- NRHP reference No.: 83004231
- Added to NRHP: November 10, 1983

The John Wilder House is a historic house on Lawrence Hill Road in the village center of Weston, Vermont. Built in 1827 for a prominent local politician, it is a distinctive example of transitional Federal-Greek Revival architecture in brick. Some of its interior walls are adorned with stencilwork attributed to Moses Eaton. The house was listed on the National Register of Historic Places in 1983.

== Description and history ==
The John Wilder House stands a short way west of Farrar Park, the village green of Weston, on the north side of Lawrence Hill Road. It is a large brick building, five bays wide, with a front-facing gable roof and granite slab foundation. The front-facing gable is fully pedimented, with two sash windows set in segmented-arch openings below a plaque showing the construction date. On either side are blind half-arches filled with wood panels. Windows on the first two floors are set in similar openings, and the main entrance is set in a large segmented-arch opening, flanked by slender pilasters and sidelight windows, and topped by an arched transom window. The interior is reflective of several periods, having undergone a Colonial Revival redecoration in the early 20th century. Most notable is the stencilwork on the walls of two rooms, which has on a stylistic basis been attributed to the itinerant New Hampshire artist Moses Eaton.

The house was built in 1827 for John Wilder, a Massachusetts native who moved to Weston in 1825. He soon became prominent in local civic affairs, serving on town offices and in the state legislature. The house remained in the hands of Wilder's descendants until 1981.

== See also ==
- National Register of Historic Places listings in Windsor County, Vermont
