= Terribile =

Terribile may refer to:

- Fabio Terribile (born 1962), Italian agricultural scientist and professor
- Jackie Terribile, American politician
- Italian ironclad Terribile

== See also ==
- Terrible (disambiguation)
- Terribilità, a quality ascribed to Michelangelo's art
