= Weston Village Historic District =

Historic district in Vermont, United States

- U.S. National Register of Historic Places
- U.S. Historic district
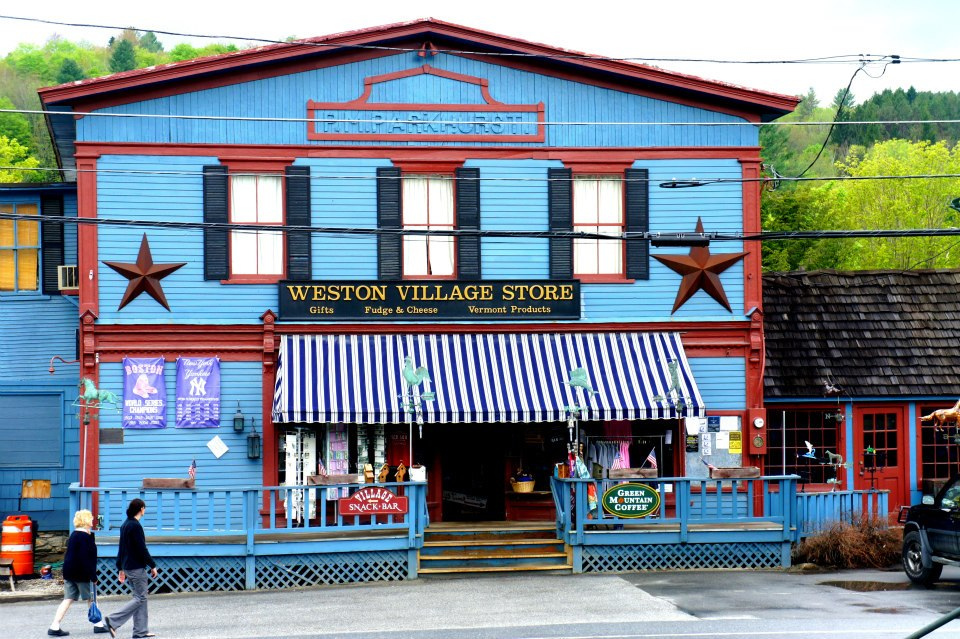

- Location within Vermont Location within the United States
- Location: Main, Park & School Sts., Lawrence Hill, Landgrove & Trout Club Rds., Mill Lane & Chester Mountain Rd., Weston, Vermont
- Coordinates: 43°17′30″N 72°47′40″W
- Area: 62 acres (25 ha)
- Architectural style: Mid 19th Century Revival, Colonial Revival, Late Victorian
- NRHP reference No.: 85001934
- Added to NRHP: August 29, 1985

The Weston Village Historic District encompasses the town center and principal village of Weston, Vermont. Centered on Farrar Park, which serves as the town green, it includes a diversity of architectural styles from the late 18th century to about 1935, and includes residential, civic, commercial, industrial and religious buildings. It was listed on the National Register of Historic Places in 1985.

== Description and history ==
The town of Weston is located in southwestern Windsor County, in a relatively remote valley in the foothills of the Green Mountains. Originally part of Andover to the east, it was separately incorporated in 1799 due to the difficulties associated with crossing the mountain ridge separating the communities. Its main village arose at the confluence of Cold Spring Brook and the West River, where Ezekial Pease built a sawmill about 1780. Pease's original house survives as an ell to an early 19th-century Federal style house. In 1795, Oliver Farrar built the tavern that faces the park bearing his family's name; it was the site of Weston's first town meeting. The park was formally laid out in the 1880s, at roughly the height of the village's prosperity.

The historic district is a roughly Y-shaped area, extending from Farrar Park north and south along Vermont Route 100 (Main Street), and west along Lawrence Hill Road. Its northern extent is the junction of Vermont 100 and Chester Mountain Road, and the western extent is the junction of Lawrence Hill and Trout Brook Roads. Its southern boundary is just south of Mill Lane. Most of the buildings in the district are wood frame residences, one and two stories in height. Dominating the view at the center is the theater of the Weston Playhouse Theatre Company, Vermont's oldest performing company. Public buildings include the Colonial Revival town office building, the Wilder Memorial Public Library, and the Italianate former Weston School. One prominent brick house is the John Wilder House on Lawrence Hill Road, which was separately listed on the National Register in 1983.

== See also ==
- National Register of Historic Places listings in Windsor County, Vermont
