= Betsy Shaw =

American snowboarder

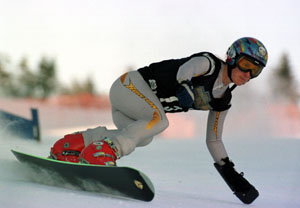
- Shaw snowboarding in 1998
- Born: December 20, 1965 (age 60); Bennington, Vermont, U.S.
- Occupation: Snowboarder (retired)
- Children: 2

Betsy Shaw (born December 20, 1965) is an American snowboarder who competed in the 1998 Nagano Olympics.

== Early life ==
Shaw was born in Bennington, Vermont in 1965. She began skiing at the age of three with her father and siblings in Manchester, Vermont. She skied competitively, and was a member of the Burr and Burton ski team. In college, at age 20, she began snowboarding instead. She originally enrolled in the University of New Hampshire, but eventually transferred to the University of Vermont. She was sponsored by Burton, a snowboard manufacturer.

== Snowboarding career ==
=== Pre-Olympics ===
Shaw won the 1991 US Open Slalom. In 1995 she won the Giant Slalom, receiving the World Title, and that same year she received the bronze and silver medals for the ISF World Championships, held in Switzerland, and the snowboarding Alpine world title.

=== Olympics ===
Before the Olympics, Shaw described herself as feeling burned out and considering retirement, but said the announcement of the addition of snowboarding to the Olympics reignited her competitive spirit. She qualified for and competed in the 1998 Olympics snowboarding competition, along with American teammates Sondra Van Ert, Rosey Fletcher, and Lisa Kosglow. She was predicted to medal in the competition, but was disqualified for falling and missing a gate, and did not receive a score. Shaw's teammate Fletcher explained that the snow was full of hard ice chunks, or "death cookies", which the US athletes were not used to. Shaw later said of the competition, "I just felt like I was hanging on for dear life all the way down."

=== Post-Olympics ===
Shaw retired from snowboarding a year after the Olympics. In a 2014 interview she explained that "it was all getting a bit too serious."

Shaw was inducted to the Vermont Ski and Snowboard Museum's Hall of Fame in 2014. She said of the award, “That was a real honor. I really identify with being a Vermonter.”

== Personal life ==
Shaw now lives in Middletown Springs, Vermont with her husband and two daughters. Career-wise, she is now a blogger and editor at the website Babycenter, and teaches skiing and snowboarding to children.
