= Landsupport =

European Union land use project

Landsupport (spelling: LANDSUPPORT) is a pilot consulting project funded by the European Union for land use for the near-natural modeling of different types and methods of land use while at the same time protecting the environment.

== Project goal ==
In the long term, sustainable use of the soil must be guaranteed in order to meet the needs of the world's population. The project brings together numerous universities, research institutions, companies and stakeholders with the aim of creating a web-based, free system to support practical agriculture and land users in making decisions about sustainable land use, environmental protection and agricultural use.

With the active participation of various and numerous stakeholders in and outside Europe, the consortium also aims at legislation at European level, based on scientific data that is processed and modeled in the system.

In the research framework program Horizon 2020, the project is organized under the direction of Fabio Terribile at the University of Naples Federico II.

== Project consortium ==
The Landsupport consortium consists of the following partners:

- University of Naples, Italy
- ARIESPACE, Italy
- Barcelona Supercomputing Center, Spain
- University of Natural Resources and Life Sciences, Vienna, Austria
- Consiglio Nazionale delle Ricerche, Italy
- Crops for the Future, Malaysia
- ICARDA, Tunisia
- Institute of Advanced Studies, Hungary
- Institute for Environmental Protection and Research, Italy
- Rasdaman GmbH, Germany
- Joint Research Center, European Commission
- Regione Campania, Italy
- University of Milan, Italy
- Zala County, Hungary
- CMAST / Modis, Belgium
- Acteon, France
- Federal Environment Agency, Austria
- Slovenian Forestry Institute, Slovenia

== Results and advice ==
The results of the investigations are internationally evaluated by the members in specialist committees and made available to practice and the responsible bodies at regional and state level, as well as to the European Union for legislative and approval procedures.

== See also ==
- Bioeconomy
- Biofector
- Edaphon
- Microbiology
- Pedology
