= Rosie Fortna =

American alpine skier (born 1946)

Personal information
- Born: December 18, 1946 (age 79) Italy

Skiing career
- Sport: Alpine skiing
- Club: Mt. Mansfield Club, Mammoth Mountain Ski Club
- Disciplines: Slalom skiing

Olympics
- Teams: 1 (1968)
- Medals: 0

Rosie Fortna (born December 18, 1946) is a retired American alpine skier who competed in the 1968 Winter Olympics.

== Awards ==
2016 - Vermont Ski and Snowboard Museum Special Contributor
