= Farrar-Mansur House =

- U.S. Historic district – Contributing property
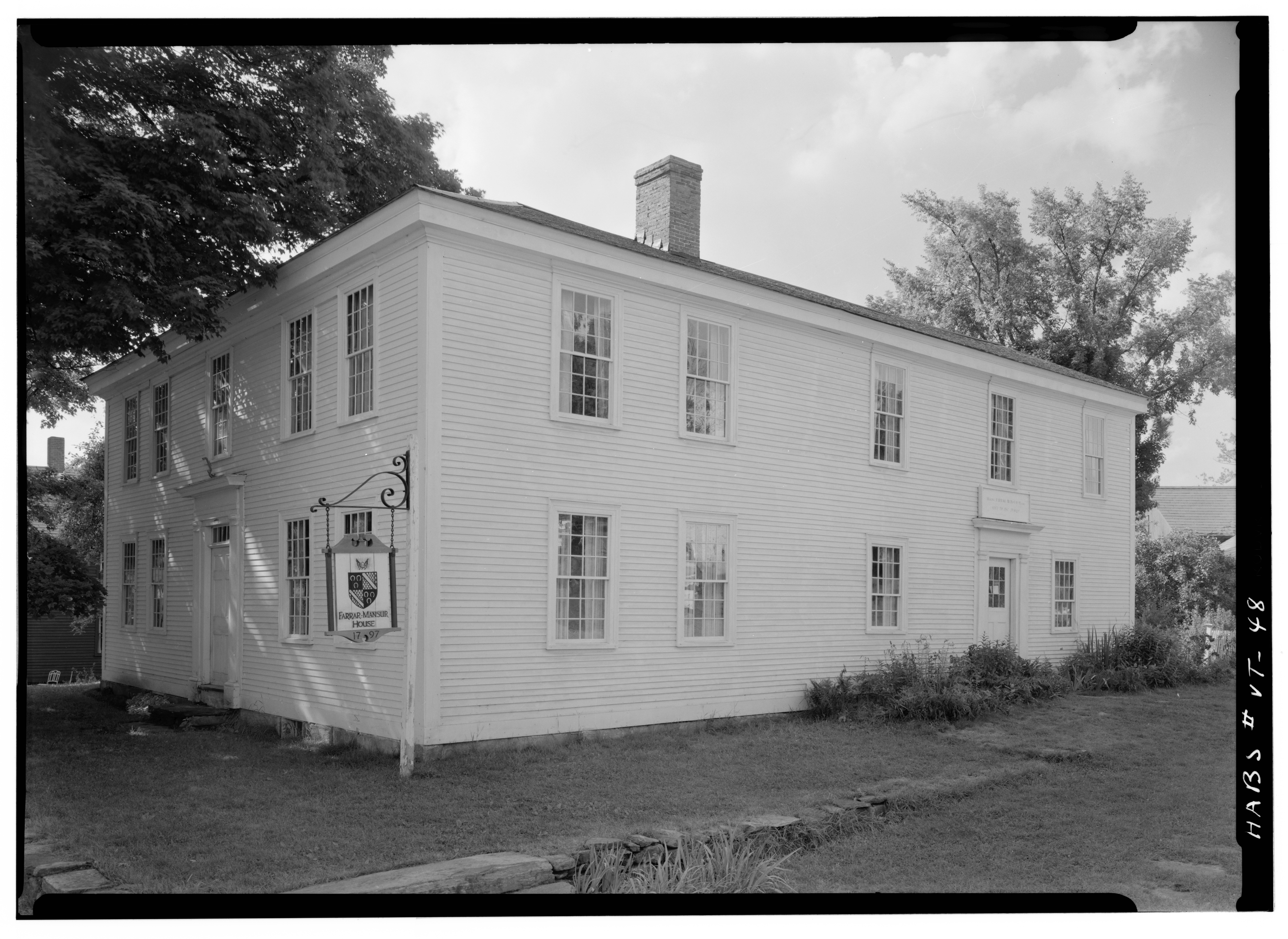
- Farrar-Mansur House, 1930s

- Location within Vermont Location within the United States
- Location: Main Street; Weston, Vermont
- Coordinates: 43.2922946°N 72.7948932°W
- Built: 1797
- Built by: Captain Oliver Farrar
- Architectural style: Federal
- Part of: Weston Village Historic District (ID85001934)
- Designated CP: August 29, 1985

The Farrar-Mansur House is a historic house in Weston, Vermont built in 1797. It is within the boundaries of the Weston Village Historic District, which was listed on the National Register of Historic Places on August 29, 1985.

== History ==
The building was originally built by Captain Oliver Farrar as a residence. He built a large addition which included a tavern. The Farrar family lived in the house until 1857, when they sold it to the Mansurs, who occupied it for three generations until 1932. Frank Mansur donated the house to. the Community Club with the stipulation that it be restored and converted to a museum. In the 1930s, it underwent a community-supported restoration, with new clapboarding and exterior moldings, murals in the parlor, exposed beams in the tavern room, as well as furnishings and accessories from the eighteenth and early nineteenth centuries.

The Farrar-Mansur House is now operated as a historic house museum by the Weston Historical Society. The museum's collection includes many pieces of New England furniture, examples of early 19th century Vermont-made metalware, toys, musical instruments, china, pottery, glassware, costumes, quilts, samplers, and 19th century portraits.

== Bibliography ==
- Buildings of Vermont, Glenn M. Andres and Curtis B. Johnson. Charlottesville: University of Virginia Press, 2013, pages 384–385.
