= Mildred Ellen Orton =

American businesswoman (1911–2010)

Mildred Ellen Orton (née Wilcox; February 9, 1911 – May 6, 2010) was an American businesswoman and author who co-founded the Vermont Country Store with her husband, Vrest Orton, in Weston, Vermont, in 1946.

== Biography ==
Orton was born at a farm near Manchester, Vermont, on February 9, 1911. She was the youngest of three siblings born to her parents, Erwin and Maria Hamilton Wilcox. Wilcox graduated in 1930 from Rutland Business College.

She married her husband, Vrest Orton, in 1936. The Ortons launched the original Vermont Country Store catalog business in Fall 1945. The couple opened the Vermont Country Store in 1946. The store was a replica of an original store that Vrest Orton's father had owned and operated in North Calais, Vermont. Mildred Orton co-ran the business until her retirement in 1978.

In 1947, Orton authored a cookbook, Cooking with Wholegrains, featuring whole grains instead of white flour. Orton developed her recipes using stone ground grains from a gristmill in Weston, Vermont. Stone-ground grains were then introduced as a prominent product at the Vermont Country Store and catalog.

Orton died at her home in Weston, Vermont, on May 6, 2010, at the age of 99. She was survived by her son, Lyman Orton, who now runs Vermont Country Store; stepson, Geoffrey; eight grandchildren; and four great-grandchildren. Her husband, Vrest, died in 1986.
