= 1950s House =

Exhibit at the Shelburne Museum in Vermont, United States

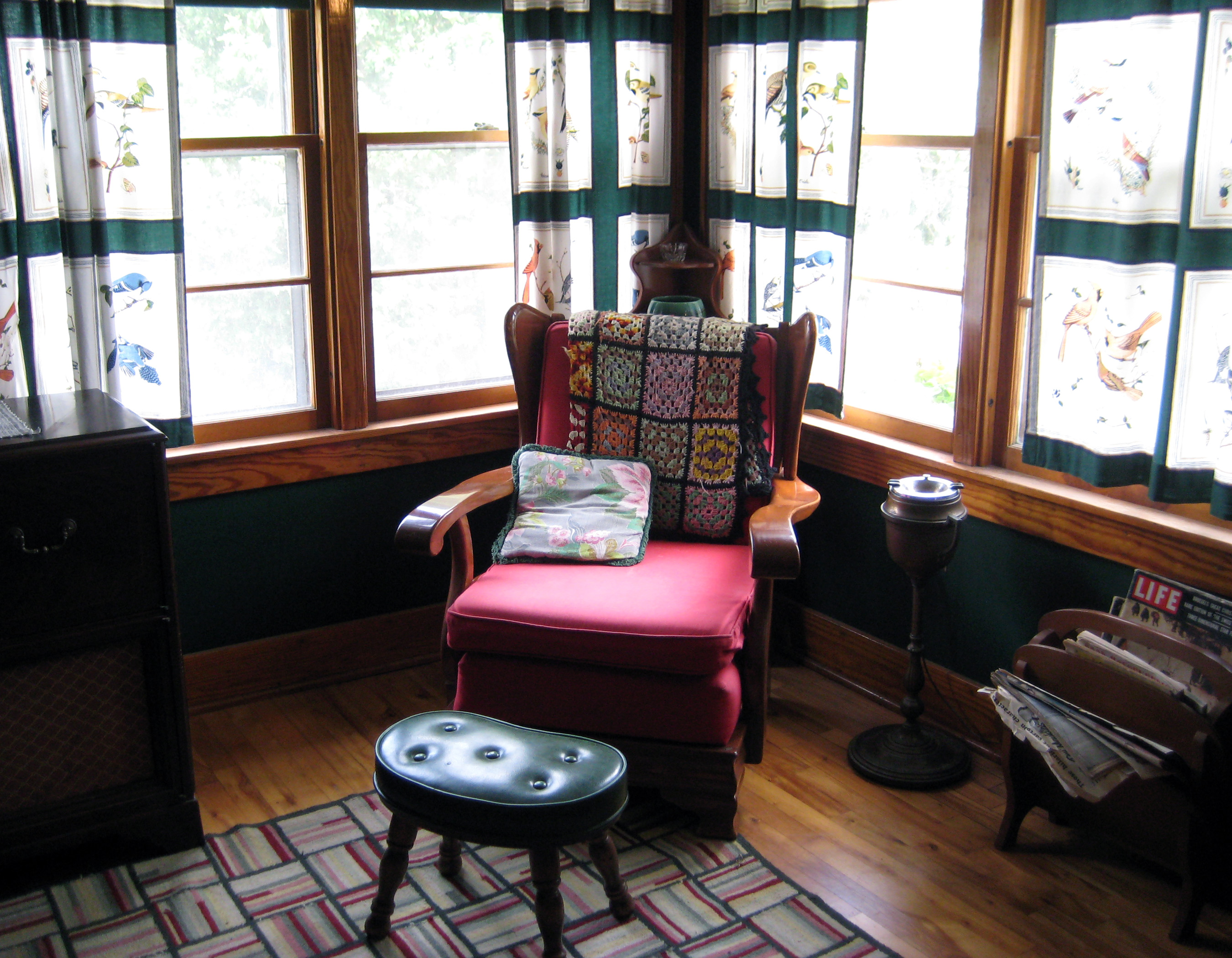
Interior of the 1950s House, Shelburne Museum

The 1950s House was a hands-on exhibit building at Shelburne Museum in Shelburne, Vermont. The exhibit was designed to allow museum visitors to experience everyday life in 1950s Vermont.

The house, which opened at the Shelburne Museum in 2000, brought to life the transformative history of America during the mid-20th century when a vibrant consumer culture developed after World War II. Having been built in the 1940s, it was outfitted in late-1940s design and decoration. The furnishings and decor highlighted the industrial boom of the late 1940s and early 1950s. Packed with the era's fashionable furniture, books, toys, food, and magazines, the 1950s House provided a window into mid-century visual culture.

== History ==
Shelburne residents Frank and Helen LaFlam built the 1950s House on land purchased in 1948 from the subdivision of a 200-acre (0.81 km^{2}) farm. In 1950 Vermont had abundant land and natural resources, and the town of Shelburne, which did not institute zoning until 1957, encouraged new home building.

In designing their house, the LaFlams incorporated state-of-the-art amenities such as central heating, public water, and modern bathroom and kitchen appliances, including a refrigerator and built-in cabinets. The burgeoning industry of the late 1940s enabled the LaFlams to purchase a ready-cut house (see prefabricated home) modeled from architectural plans and specifications that was inexpensive and easily shipped to the building site. The one-story design, attached garage, plain overhanging eaves, and simple white clapboard siding represent the hallmarks of mid-century house design. The LaFlams detailed the windows and doors with broad, stained wood trim, which is the kind of simple detailing available in a lumber-rich place like Vermont. The house, which is neither a traditional Cape nor a typical ranch, has characteristics of do-it-yourself construction, with an engagingly awkward mix-and-match of new and old, typical and idiosyncratic, details. In the summer of 2000, the house was opened to the public as a temporary exhibition entitled "The Fabulous 50's: Welcome Home to Postwar Vermont". In 2002, the exhibition was extended through 2005.

As of May 4, 2012, the 1950s house was torn down to make way for the Pizagalli center for art and education.

== See also ==
- Electra Havemeyer Webb
- 1950s
