= Vermont Country Store =

American retail company

The Vermont Country Store
- Company type: Private
- Industry: Retail
- Founded: 1946; 80 years ago in Weston, Vermont, United States
- Headquarters: Manchester
- Area served: Weston, Rockingham, North Clarendon, near Rutland (distribution facility and customer service center)
- Website: www.vermontcountrystore.com

The Vermont Country Store, Inc., is an American catalog, retail, and e-commerce business based in Vermont. The company was established in 1946 and is operated by the Orton family.

== History ==
Although The Vermont Country Store was first opened in 1946 in Weston, Vermont, by Vrest and Mildred Ellen Orton, its origins lie in the Orton family's long Vermont history. In 1897, Gardner Lyman Orton, the eighth generation of Ortons in the United States, opened a general store with his father-in-law Melvin Teachout in Calais, Vermont. Gardner's wife Leila gave birth to their eldest son Vrest that same year. The Teachout-Orton general store was the focal point of Vrest's early years and served as the original inspiration for The Vermont Country Store.

After serving in World War I, in France, Vrest entered the class of 1923 at Harvard. He served briefly in the U.S. Consular Service before moving to New York City in 1925. There he was on the staff of H.L. Mencken’s American Mercury, Alfred Knopf publishers, the Saturday Review of Literature, Life magazine, and in 1929 founded the international book collector’s magazine, The Colophon. During this time, Vrest became known as an authority on typography and book collecting and published many articles about various American writers. Vrest returned to Vermont in 1930 and settled in the village of Weston. He married Mildred Ellen Wilcox in 1936 and founded a book publishing company, The Countryman Press, the same year.

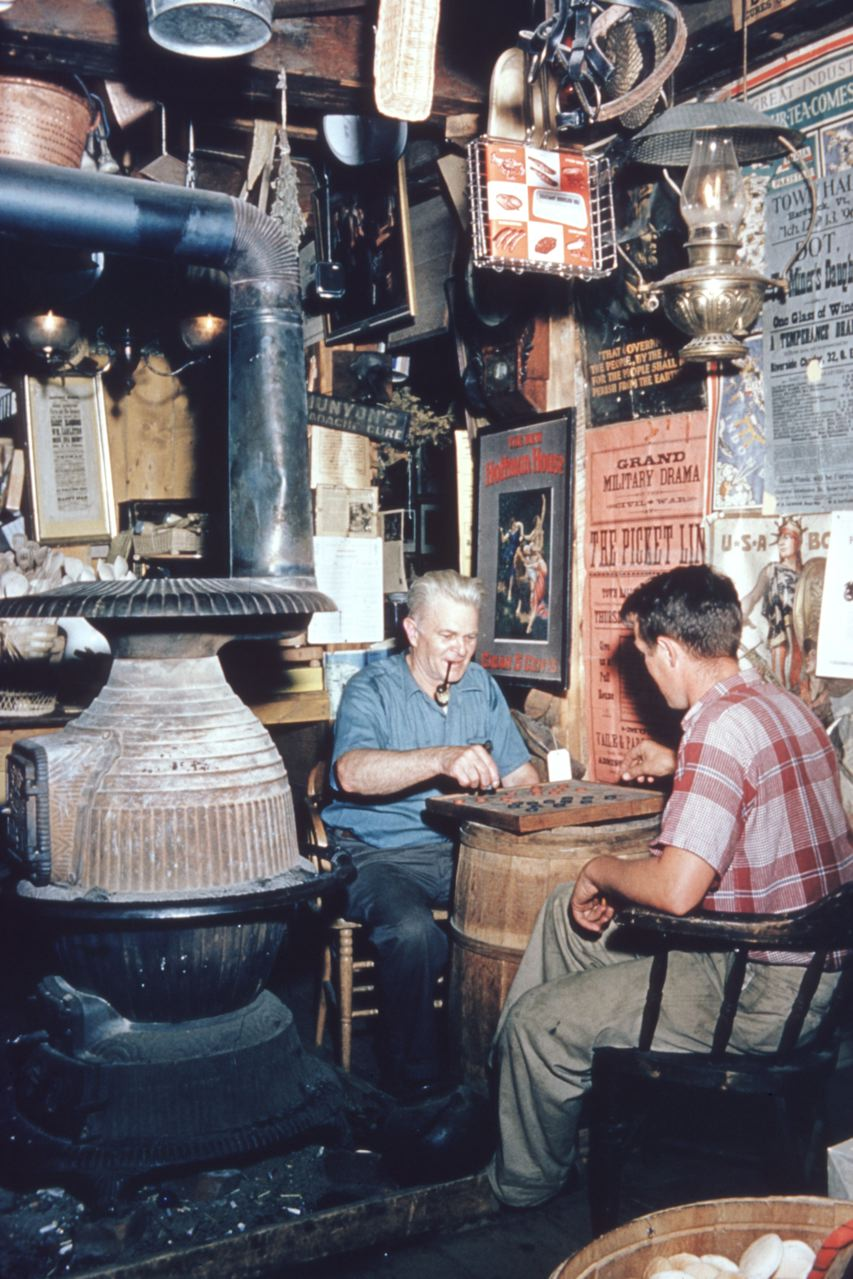
The interior of the store, 1946

During World War II Vrest worked at the Pentagon as a speechwriter and publicist. There he hatched the idea of creating a catalog and store based on the Teachout-Orton store.

In the fall of 1945, Vrest and Mildred officially entered the mail-order business with a catalog, "The Voice of the Mountains". Vrest printed the catalog, consisting of 12 pages and 36 items, on the printing press in his garage, and Mildred mailed it to her family Christmas card list. Riding on the success of that first catalog, Vrest and Mildred purchased a two-story structure in Weston, built in 1827, that had originally been a country inn and opened The Vermont Country Store in the spring of 1946. The Weston store has the distinction of being America's first restored and fully operational country store and has been placed on the National Register of Historic Places.

As its catalog mailing list grew, the store gained national attention with the publication of a 1952 article in the Saturday Evening Post by Edward Shenton entitled, "The Happy Shopkeeper of the Green Mountains". At the time, The Saturday Evening Post had a readership of several million people and was one of the most widely read publications in America. The feature article yielded The Vermont Country Store unprecedented exposure to a national audience, resulting in tens of thousands of inquiries from people all over the country, eager to visit the store. Vrest was quick to capitalize on this new-found publicity and began expanding the store.

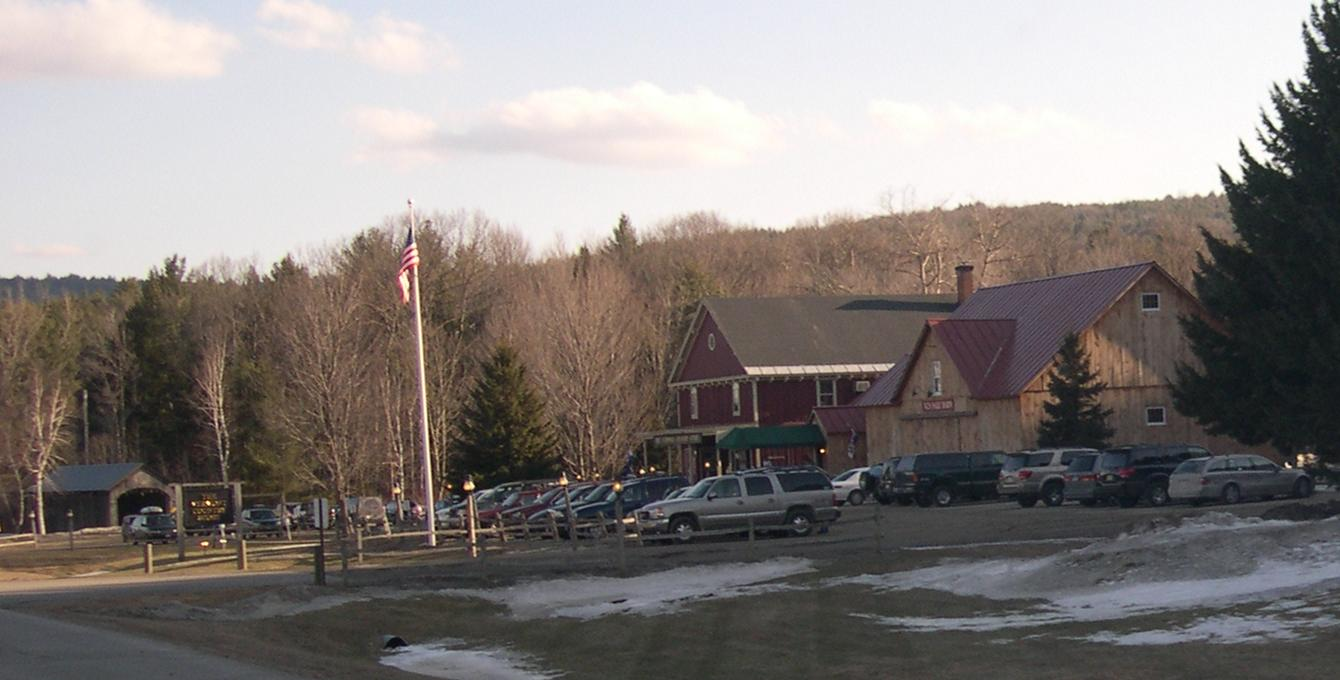
The Vermont Country Store location on VT 103 in Rockingham

In 1959 Vrest and Mildred bought the home next to the store and opened a restaurant, The Bryant House. In 1968, Vrest was inspired by the growth of the business to open a second store on Route 103 in Rockingham, Vermont. The location features a mill pond, an authentic gristmill with a water wheel, and a restored covered bridge. In 2010, Orton's grandsons opened Mildred's Dairy Bar at the Bryant House, in honor of Mildred Orton. The dairy bar serves classic New England roadside food, featuring Wilcox's ice cream, delivered from the Wilcox farm in Manchester, Vermont, where Mildred was raised.

Vrest and Mildred's son Lyman became President of The Vermont Country Store in 1972. His sons, Cabot, Gardner, and Eliot continue the family's business.

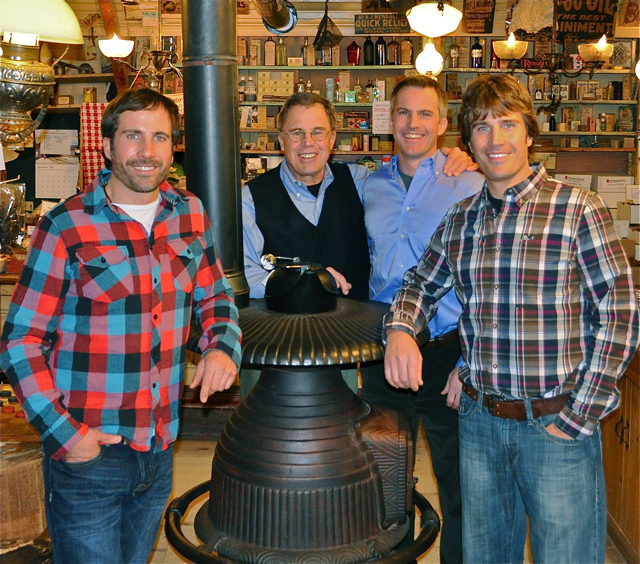
Gardner, Lyman, Cabot and Eliot Orton, 2010
