= Fabio Terribile =

Italian agricultural scientist

Fabio Terribile (born November 2, 1962, in Naples) is an Italian agricultural scientist and professor at the University of Naples Federico II. He is a pedologist and coordinator of the EU project Landsupport.

== Life and work ==
After completing his degree in agricultural sciences at the University of Naples Federico II (1987), he earned a doctorate in philosophy (PhD) in soil science at the University of Aberdeen (UK) with a research thesis in pedology with his dissertation on the characterization of two Italian vertisoles with a focus on light and Electron Microscopy, Clay Mineralogy, and Image Analysis (1996). This was followed by activities as a research assistant at the National Research Council CNR ISPAIM (now CNR ISAFoM) in Ercolano (Naples) and as Associate Professor of Pedology at the Ministry of Agriculture of the University of Naples Federico II (2002). Since 2014 he has been Director of the Interdepartmental Research Center “Earth Critical Zone “Support for landscape and environmental management, coordinator of the AISSA working group for the proposal for a framework law for sustainable protection and sustainable management of the soil (ddl 1181) and coordinator of the EU research program Landsupport.

== Memberships ==
- 1998–2015: President of the High Physical Soil Formation Association (AFFiS); : Vice-President (2nd Vice-President; elections Moscow 1996 and Ghent 2001) of the International Commission for Soil Micromorphology (Sub-Commission B) of the International Union of Soil Science for the years 1996–2002
- 1998–2015: Part of (i) Consiglio Direttivo of the Italian Society for Soil Science (SIPE); (ii) World Reference Base Working Group coordinated by the FAO; (iii) Working group “Digital Soil Mapping”, coordinated by the Institute for Environment and Sustainability, European Commission, Joint Research Center; Ispra; (iv) Scientific Committee for Soil Science of the Campania Region (Agricultural Council).
- 2002–2015: Reviewer for the journals Soil Science Society of American Journal, Geoderma, Catena, Quaternary International, Journal of Volcanology and Geothermal Research, Terranova and for several Italian scientific journals (Bollettino Italiano di Scienza del Suolo). Reviewer CIVR (2005) of the Italian Ministry of university and Research (MIUR)
- 2007–2008: Member of the Scientific Committee in Support of the New Urban Planning of the Napoli District (Piano Territoriale di coordinamento Provinciale (PTCP) di Napoli). 2003–2008: President of the Soil Physics Commission (Commission 1) of the Italian Soil Society.
- Since 2002 he has been: Convenor at the World Congress of Soil Science-Bangkok; World Congress of Soil Science-Philapelphia). Organizer of several other international (EGU 2005, Geoitalia 2005, IWMSM 2012) and national (SISS, SIPE).
- 2013: Coordinator of a study on the evaluation and assessment of FAO tools for land assessment and land modeling
- 2014–2017: Coordinator of the research project "Soil Monitor: an innovative web tool for assessment land use on a national scale" in cooperation with CNR, ISPRA and INU (official presentation of the platform in Palazzo Madama, Rome on June 28, 2016) 2010– 2014: Project manager for the EU LIFE + project "Multifunctional soil protection and land management through the development of a web-based spatial decision support system" (LIFE08 ENV / IT / 000408)
- 2010–2014: Scientific director of the research project “ZOnazione VIticola a Scala Aziendale - ZOVISA” PSR Campania 2007–2013, Misura 124.

== Main scientific commitments ==
- 2013: Coordinator of a Study for Evaluation and Assessment of FAO Tools for land evaluation and land modeling
- 2011‐2015: Associate editor for the international journal Soil Research.
- 2009‐2015: President of the Italian Society of Pedology – SIPE (elective office). Since 2016 he has played Past‐President role.
- 2009‐2015: Editor (topical) of the International journals Solid Earth and member of the editorial board of Italian Journal of Agronomy 2008: activity as referee for the EU– FP7
- 2007‐2008: Member of the scientific committee supporting the new urban planning of the district of Napoli (Piano Territoriale di coordinamento Provinciale (PTCP) di Napoli). 2003‐2008: President of the Commission of Soil Physics (Commission 1) of the Italian Society of Science of the Soil.
- 2003: activity of guest editor for the international journal Quaternary International
- From 2002 to today: Convenor at the world conferences on Soil Science (World Congress of Soil Science‐Bangkok; World Congress of Soil Science‐Philapelphia, ... ). Convenor of several other international conferences (EGU 2005, Geoitalia 2005, IWMSM 2012) and national (SISS, SIPE).
- 2002‐2021: activity of referee for the reviews Soil Science Society of American Journal, Geoderma, Catena, Quaternary International, Journal of Volcanology and Geothermal Research, Terranova and for some Italian scientific journals (Bollettino Italiano di Scienza del Suolo). Referee CIVR (2005) of the Italian Ministry of university and Research (MIUR)
- 1998‐2021: Component of (i) Consiglio Direttivo of the Italian Society of Pedology (SIPE); (ii) Working Group “World Reference Base” coordinated by FAO; (iii) Working group “Digital Soil Mapping” coordinated by Institute for Environment and Sustainability, European Commission, Joint Research Centre; Ispra; (iv) Scientific Committee for Pedology of Regione Campania (Agriculture Assessorate).
- 1998‐2015: President of High Physical Soil Formation Association (AFFiS); : vice president (2nd Vice Chairperson; elections Moscow 1996 and Gent 2001) of the International Commission of Soil Micromorphology (Subcommission B) of the International Union of Soil Science for years 1996‐2002

== Responsibility of research activities ==
- 2018‐2022: Coordinatore EU Horizon 2020 project, RUR 2017‐2, id. N. 774234 “Development of integrated Land Decision Support System Aiming Towards the Implementation of Policies for Agriculture and Environment (LANDSUPPORT)”.
- 2014‐2017: Coordinator of the research project “ Soil Monitor: an innovative web tool for assessing land use on a national scale” in collaboration with CNR, ISPRA and INU (Official presentation of the platform at Palazzo Madama, Rome on 28 June 2016) 2010‐2014: Project Manager for EU LIFE+ project "Multifunctional soil conservation and land management through the development of a web‐based spatial decision Supporting System” (LIFE08 ENV/IT/000408)
- 2010‐2014: Scientific manager of the research project “ZOnazione VIticola a Scala Aziendale ‐ ZOVISA” PSR Campania 2007‐2013, Misura 124.
- 2003‐2009 Leader of a research agreement with Campania Region SeSIRCA “Developing methodologies for quantifying the soil vulnerability to nitrate pollution from agricultural sources in two areas of the Campania region” and of the Centre CIVSA
- 2006 ‐ 2007 Responsible for the convention with Calabria Region ‐ ARSSA "to study the vulnerability of soils to pollution by nitrates from agricultural sources”
- 2004 ‐ 2007 Responsible for the convention with Lombardia Region ERSAF "Setting up a network for monitoring the quality of the soil / water Lombardia (ARMOSA‐hydro)”
- 2001‐2007: National Coordinator of 3 projects Cofin 2001, Cofin 2003, Cofin 2005 financed by the Ministry of Research (MIUR) on "Soil Spatial Variability". Such project is in collaboration with the University of Milan, Turin, Palermo, Florence, Cagliari, National Research Council CNR ISAFoM (Naples) and the Agronomic Experimental Institute (IAM) of Bari.
- 2000‐2005: Scientific responsible of the Operating Unit 1.2 line 1 of National Research Council CNR G.N.D.C.I. (National research group on Hydrogeological disaster) for “studying the influence of soil studies for the improvement of the floods forecast and landslide. Applications to national scale and scale of river basin”.
- 2002‐2005: Italian scientific responsible of the Working Group "Soil Aggregation and Water Binding" in the framework of the EU Action Cost 622 on " Soil Resources of European Volcanic Systems".
- 1999‐2000 Coordinator of soil science research activities within the Operating Unit 4.21N of the National Research Council CNR G.N.D.C.I. for the study of the properties of volcanic soils predisposing to the dramatic events of Quindici and Sarno (May 1998).
- 2002‐2004: Scientific coordinator for the following research activities in collaboration with Campania Region SeSIRCA and National Research Council CNR ISPAIM: Soil maps (over 60.000 Ha) at the scale 1:50 000 of Valle Telesina, Agro Nocerino‐Sarnese, Agro of Aversa.

== Selected publications ==
- Terribile is Author of more than 100 between papers and books and chapters in books. More specifically 77 papers are reported in Scopus (and WoS), H index 25 (Scopus).
- Bonfante A., Alfieri S.M., Albrizio R., Basile A., De Mascellis R., Gambuti A., Giorio P., Langella L., Manna P., Moio L., Terribile F. (2017). Evaluation of the effects of future climate change on grape quality through a physically based model application: a case study for the Aglianico grapevine in Campania region, Italy. Agricultural Systems, Volume 152, Pages 100–109. ISSN 0308-521X, doi:10.1016/j.agsy.2016.12.009
- D'Amico M.E., Catoni M., Terribile F., Zanini E., Bonifacio E. (2016). Contrasting environmental memories in relict soils on different parent rocks in the south-western Italian Alps Quaternary International, 418, pp. 61–74. ISSN 1040-6182 doi:10.1016/j.quaint.2015.10.061
- Colombo C., Palumbo G., Di Iorio E., Russo F., Terribile F., Jang Z., Liu Q. (2016) Soil development in a Quaternary fluvio-lacustrine paleosol sequence in Southern Italy. 195–207. ISSN 1040-6182 doi:10.1016/j.quaint.2015.11.004
- Langella G., Basile A., Bonfante A., Mileti F.A., Terribile F. (2016). Spatial analysis of clay content in soils using neurocomputing and pedological support: a case study of Valle Telesina (South Italy). Environmental Earth Sciences, Volume 75, Issue 20, 1 N.1357. ISSN 1866-6280 doi:10.1007/s12665-016-6163-7
- Gargiulo L., Mele G., Terribile F. (2016). Effect of rock fragments on soil porosity: A laboratory experiment with two physically degraded soils. EUROPEAN JOURNAL OF SOIL SCIENCE, Volume 67, issues 5, p. 597-604, ISSN 1351-0754, doi:10.1111/ejss.12370
- Scalenghe R., Territo C., Petit S., Terribile F., Righi D. (2016). The role of pedogenic overprinting in the obliteration of parent material in some polygenetic landscapes of Sicily (Italy). GEODERMA REGIONAL, vol. 7, p. 49-58, ISSN 2352-0094, doi:10.1016/j.geodrs.2016.01.003
- Terribile F., Agrillo A., Bonfante A., Buscemi G., Colandrea M., D'Antonio A., De Mascellis R., De Michele C., Langella G., Manna P., Marotta L., Mileti F. A., Minieri L., Orefice N., Valentini S., Vingiani S., Basile A. (2015). A Web-based spatial decision supporting system for land management and soil conservation. SOLID EARTH, vol. 6, p. 903-928, ISSN 1869-9510, doi: 10.5194/se-6-903-2015
- Gargiulo L.; Mele G.; Terribile F. (2015). The role of rock fragments in crack and soil structure development: a laboratory experiment with a Vertisol. EUROPEAN JOURNAL OF SOIL SCIENCE, Volume: 66, Issue: 4, Pages: 757-766.
- Vingiani S.; Mele G.; De Mascellis, R.; Terribile F., Basile A. (2015). Volcanic soils and landslides: a case study of the island of Ischia (southern Italy) and its relationship with other Campania events. SOLID EARTH Volume: 6, Issue: 2. Pages: 783–797.
- Vingiani S., Scarciglia F., Mileti F.A., Donato P., Terribile F. (2014). Occurrence and origin of soils with andic properties in Calabria (southern Italy). GEODERMA Volume: 232 Pages: 500–516.
- Gargiulo L., Mele G., Terribile F. (2014). Effects of iron-based amendments on soil structure: a lab experiment using soil micromorphology and image analysis of pores JOURNAL OF SOILS AND SEDIMENTS Volume: 14, Issue: Pages: 1370–1377.
- Scarciglia F.; Zumpano V., Sulpizio R.; Terribile F., Pulice I., La Russa M.F. (2014). Major factors controlling late Pleistocene to Holocene soil development in the Vesuvius area (southern Italy). EUROPEAN JOURNAL OF SOIL SCIENCE Volume: 65 Issue: 4 Pages: 406-419
- Colombo, C. Sellitto, VM, Palumbo, G., Di Iorio, E., Terribile, F., Schulze, DG. (2014). Clay formation and pedogenetic processes in tephra-derived soils and buried soils from Central-Southern Apennines (Italy). GEODERMA 213,346-356 DOI:* 10.1016/j.geoderma.2013.08.005
- Gargiulo L., Mele G., Terribile F. (2013). Image analysis and soil micromorphology applied to study physical mechanisms of soil pore development: An experiment using iron oxides and calcium carbonate. GEODERMA 197, 151–160. doi:10.1016/j.geoderma.2013.01.008 ISSN 0016-7061
- Terribile F., Basile A., Bonfante A., Carbone A., Colombo C., Langella G., Iamarino M., Manna P., Minieri L., Vingiani S. (2013). Future Soil Issues. In: Costantini & Dazzi (eds), The soils of Italy, Springer
- Mileti F.A., Langella G., Prins M.A., Vingiani S., Terribile F. (2013). The hidden nature of parent material in soils of Italian mountain ecosystems. GEODERMA, vol. 207, p. 291-309, ISSN 0016-7061, doi:10.1016/j.geoderma.2013.05.006
- Vingiani S., Terribile F., Adamo P. (2013). Weathering and particle entrapment at the rock-lichen interface in Italian volcanic environment. GEODERMA 207, 244–255. *DOI:* 10.1016/j.geoderma.2013.05.015
- Langella G., Basile A., Bonfante A., Manna P., Terribile F. (2012). The LIFE+ SOILCONSWEB project: a web based spatial decision support system embedding DSM engines. In: “Digital Soil Assessments and Beyond” - Minasny, Malone & McBratney (eds), CRC Press, 2012
- Vingiani S., Zampella M., Minieri L., Terribile F., Adamo P. (2012). Definizione di una firma "geochimico-mineralogica" dei suoli destinati alla produzione della patata precoce. MINERVA BIOTECNOLOGICA, vol. 24, p. 51-60, ISSN 1120-4826
