= Vermont International Museum of Contemporary Art + Design =

- Former name: Vermont Museum of Contemporary Art + Design
- Location: Eden, Vermont
- Coordinates: 44°42′46″N 72°31′28″W
- Type: Art museum
- Website: http://www.vtmocad.com/

The Vermont International Museum of Contemporary Art + Design includes a permanent collection, thematic exhibitions and a mobile microvenue. The museum's world headquarters, which include gallery space and an outdoor sculpture park, are located in Eden, Vermont, which is located in the Green Mountains.

According to Seven Days Vermont, "The Mobile Museum is not just a mobile museum — it's a mobile miniature museum housed in a revamped 1960s camper trailer. The works on view (are) primarily sculptures — at a 1:12 scale." In 2016, The Vermont International Museum of Contemporary Art and Design received funding from the Vermont Arts Council and the National Endowment for the Arts to support its mobile museum project, which began touring in 2017.

The Museum changed its name from the Vermont Museum of Contemporary Art + Design to the Vermont International Museum of Contemporary Art + Design in 2015.
