= Noyes House Museum =

Historic house in Vermont

Coordinates: 44°33′41″N 72°36′04″W

The Noyes House Museum is a historic house and museum Morristown, Vermont, overlooking the Lamoille River.

== History ==
John Safford built the house in 1797. In 1810, he sold the property to his son Jedediah who expanded the house with a brick Federal style addition. He also built the English barn in the 1820s.

== Museum ==
The Noyes House Museum exhibits focus on 19th century life in Morristown. The museum's collection includes furniture, military objects, textiles, clothing, photographs, pottery, folk and fine art, and many of the tools and objects of Vermont farm life in the 19th century. Each year, the museum has new exhibits showcasing aspects of 19th century Victorian life in the area. Past exhibits have focused on Victorian Etiquette, Grimm's Fairy Tales, and Death in the Civil War.

Among its large collection, the museum has an 18th-century Native American dugout canoe and an extensive collection of hairwork items.
