= Terrible Mountain (Colorado) =

Mountain in Colorado, United States

Coordinates: 38.666281°N 106.540777°W

Terrible Mountain is a summit in Gunnison County, Colorado, in the United States. With an elevation of 11,791 feet (3,594 m), Terrible Mountain is the 1,337th highest summit in the state of Colorado.
