= Vermont Ski and Snowboard Museum =

- Location within Vermont
- Established: 1988
- Location: The Perkins Building; 1 South Main Street; Stowe, Vermont
- Coordinates: 44°28′31″N 72°42′08″W
- Type: Sports museum
- Website: VSSM

The Vermont Ski and Snowboard Museum is a winter sports museum in Vermont. It was founded in 1988 in Brandon, Vermont as The Vermont Ski Museum. In 2000, the museum moved to Stowe and opened to the public at its current location in 2002.

In 2011, the word snowboarding was added to the museum's name. Currently, the museum changes exhibits annually, except the Hall of Fame.

The museum's main objective is to "collect, preserve, and celebrate Vermont's skiing and snowboarding history." Its mission is:

to utilize the resources belonging and accessible to the Vermont Ski and Snowboard Museum to create visually stimulating, historically in-depth exhibits that fulfill this mission that fulfill the mission to Collect, Preserve and Celebrate Vermont's Skiing and Snowboarding History.

== Location ==
The museum building was originally the 1818 Old Town Hall, but the structure was physically moved during the 1860s. The museum is now located in the Perkins Building at 1 South Main Street, Stowe, Vermont. A complete renovation took place in 2002.

== Collection ==
As of 2012, the museum offers a broad programming schedule, which comes in support of its collection containing 7,500 items, divided into seven different areas, together with comprehensive historical descriptions:

- Ski and snowboard equipment
- Ski and snowboard clothing
- Mechanical equipment
- Vermont Ski Area – specific location items
- The 10th Mountain Division area
- The Fine art area
- The Related Library and Archival materials section includes over 800 items

The museum is participating in the digitization of historical films and collection of interviews. These resources might be made available to the general public.

To maintain the collections, the museum undertakes preservation activities, rotates exhibits, and makes them accessible to the general public.

== Events ==
In addition to the exhibits, the museum hosts several annual events including the Stowe Mountain Film Festival, the VT Antique Alpine Race, the VT Antique Nordic Race, the Epic Summer Event, and the presentation of the Paul Robbins Ski Journalism Award.

== Hall of Fame ==
The museum awards the Vermont Ski and Snowboard Hall of Fame.

=== Hall of Fame inductees ===
Inductee Name	Year Inducted	Category
Foster Chandler	2018	
Dennis Donahue	2018	
Hannah Kearney	2018	
Paul Johnston	2018	
Janet and Brad Mead	2018	
Chuck & Jann Perkins	2017	
Ann Battelle	2017	
Dickie Hall	2017	
Chip LaCasse	2016	Athlete
Stan Dunklee	2016	Athlete
Paul Graves	2016	Special Contributor
Rosie Fortna	2016	Special Contributor
Craig Burt	2015	Special Contributor
Trina Hosmer	2015	Athlete
Dr. Edgar Holmes	2015	Special Contributor
Charlie D Lord	2015	Special Contributor
Jim Galanes	2014	Athlete
Mike Holland	2014	Athlete
Anabel Moriarty	2014	Special Contributor
Marvin Moriarty	2014	Athlete
Betsy Shaw	2014	Athlete
Sverre Caldwell	2013	Special Contributor
Emo Henrich	2013	Special Contributor
Fred Pabst Jr.	2013	Special Contributor
Ross Powers	2013	Special Contributor
Charles Bird (CB) Vaughan Jr	2013	Special Contributor
Jeff Brushie	2013	Athlete
Vermont Slope Posse (VTSP)	2013	Athletes
Jake Burton	2012	Special Contributor
Donna Carpenter	2012	Special Contributor
Charles "Minnie" Dole	2012	Special Contributor
D. Trowbridge Elliaman	2012	Special Contributor
Leslie Thompson Hall	2012	Athlete
Gale H. "Tiger" Shaw, III,	2012	Athlete
Preston Leete Smith	2011	Special Contributor
Karen Huntoon	2011	Athlete
John Morton	2011	Athlete
Greg McClallen	2011	Athlete
Lawrence (Larry) Snow Damon	2010	Athlete
Bob Gray	2010	Athlete
Hilary Engisch Klein	2010	Athlete
Johannes Von Trapp	2010	Special Contributor

=== Paul Robbins Journalism Award ===
Recipient	Year Awarded
Stu Campbell	2008
Hubert Schriebl	2009
Hank McKee	2010
Linda Adams	2012
Pat Bridges	2013
Bill McCollom	2014
Dr. Gretchen Rous Besser	2015
Mary McKhann	2016

== Gallery ==
Ski and snowboard equipment

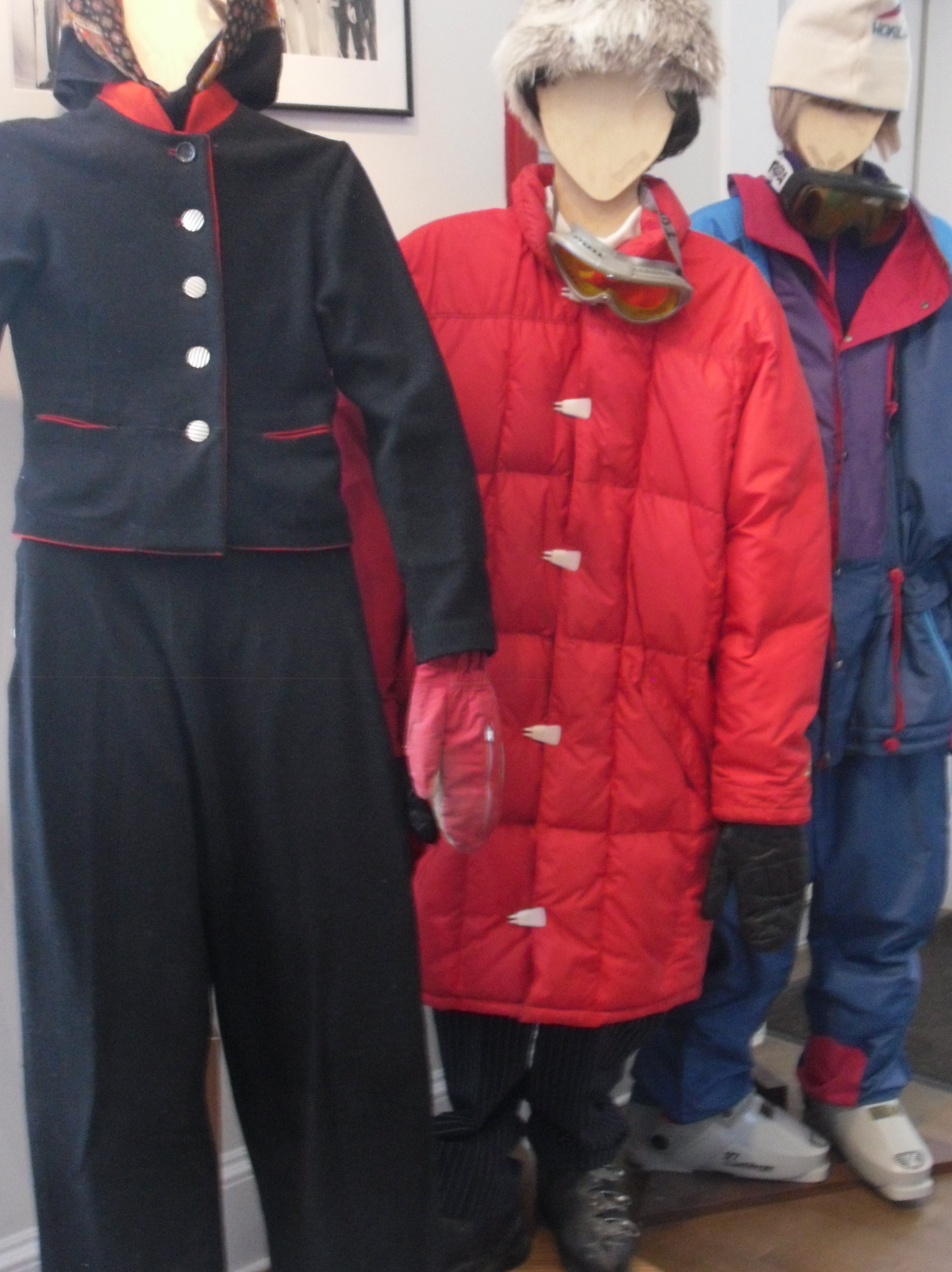
Exhibited in the Vermont Ski and Snowboard Museum displaying ski and snowboard clothing.

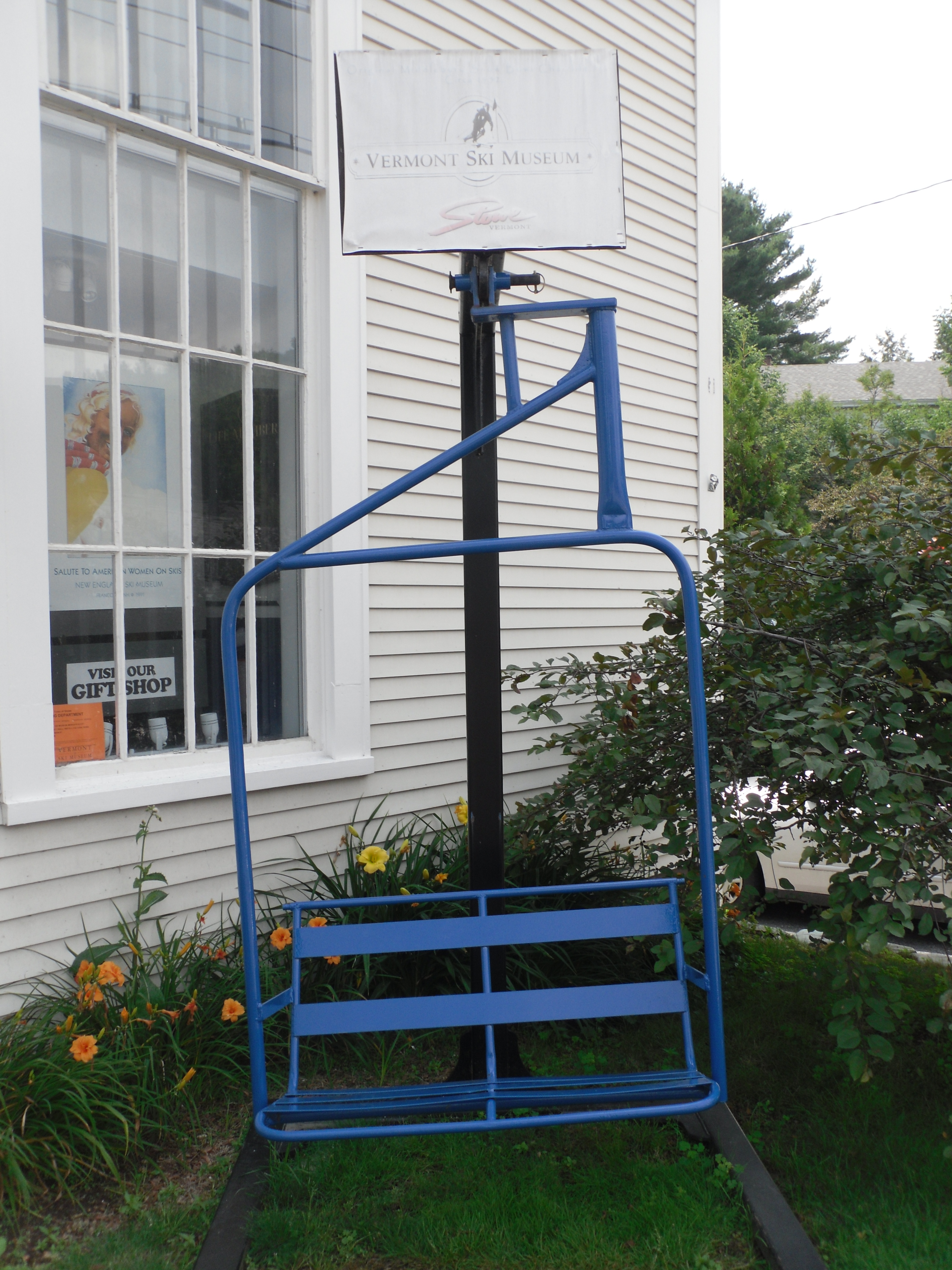
Lift outside the Vermont Ski and Snowboard Museum.

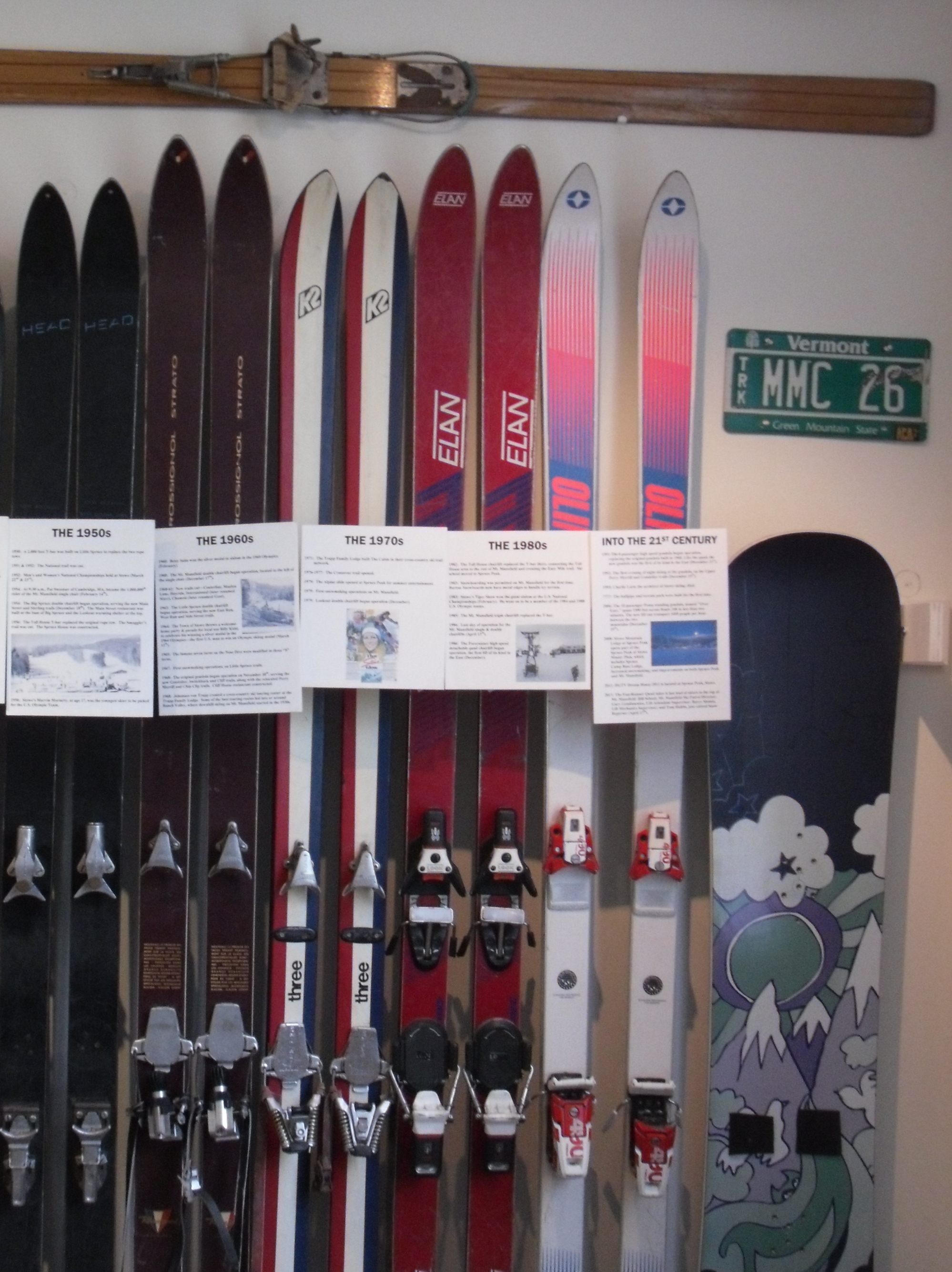
The museum's ski and snowboard equipment exhibit.

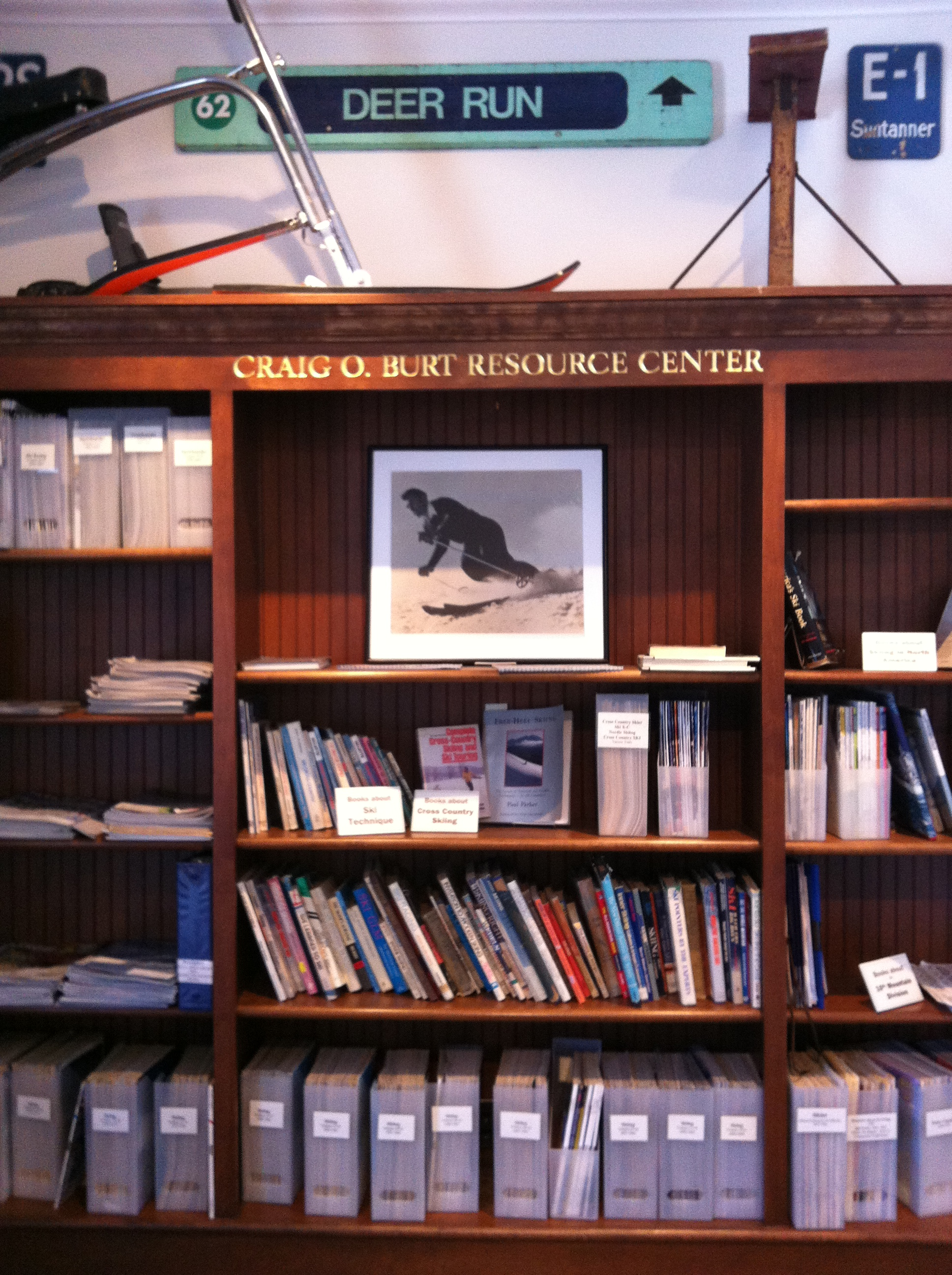
Vermont Ski and Snowboard Museum Library and Archive Materials exhibit.
