= Terrible Mountain (Vermont) =

Mountain in Vermont, United States

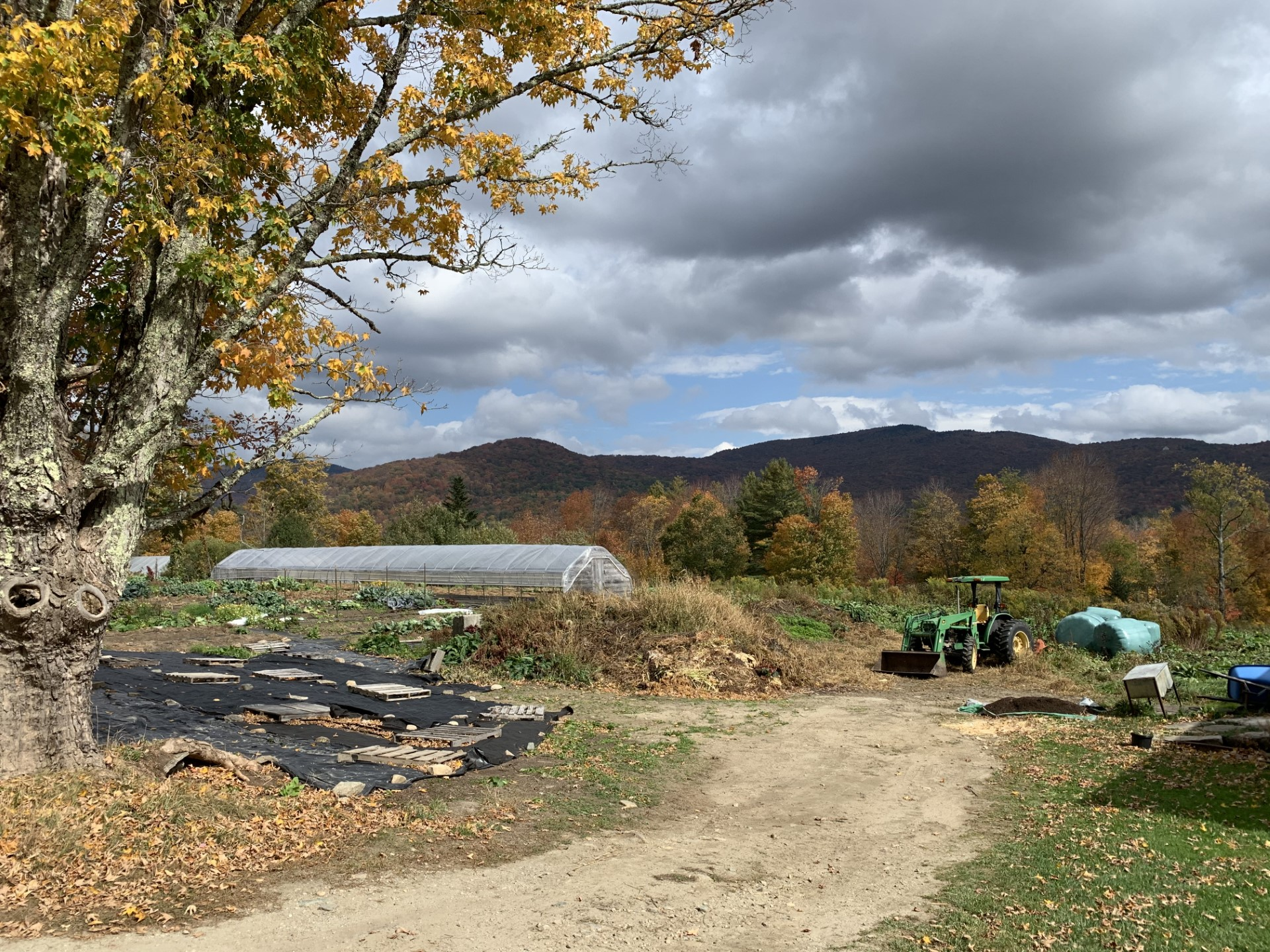
- Terrible Mountain as seen from Lawrence Hill Road in Weston, VT

Highest point
- Elevation: 2,882 ft (878 m)
- Coordinates: 43°18′48″N 72°44′36″W

Geography
- Location within Vermont
- Location: Windsor County, Vermont, USA
- Parent range: Green Mountains

Terrible Mountain is a summit in Windsor County, Vermont, in the United States. With an elevation of 2,882 feet (878 m), Terrible Mountain is the 214th highest summit in the state of Vermont.

Terrible Mountain was likely so named by early settlers due to its terrain.

== Accident ==
On March 19, 1968, a Beechcroft G18S crashed into Terrible Mountain, killing all 7 people on board, 2 pilots and 5 passengers. The passengers were executives from the Jones and Lamson Company based in Springfield, VT and were flying on a private flight from Bridgeport, CT to Springfield, VT. The pilot had knowingly attempted to fly through foggy conditions with faulty instrumentation. The wreckage of the plane was never cleared, and still sits on top of the mountain. There is a small plastic plaque dedicated to one of the passengers who died, Burton B. Burks.

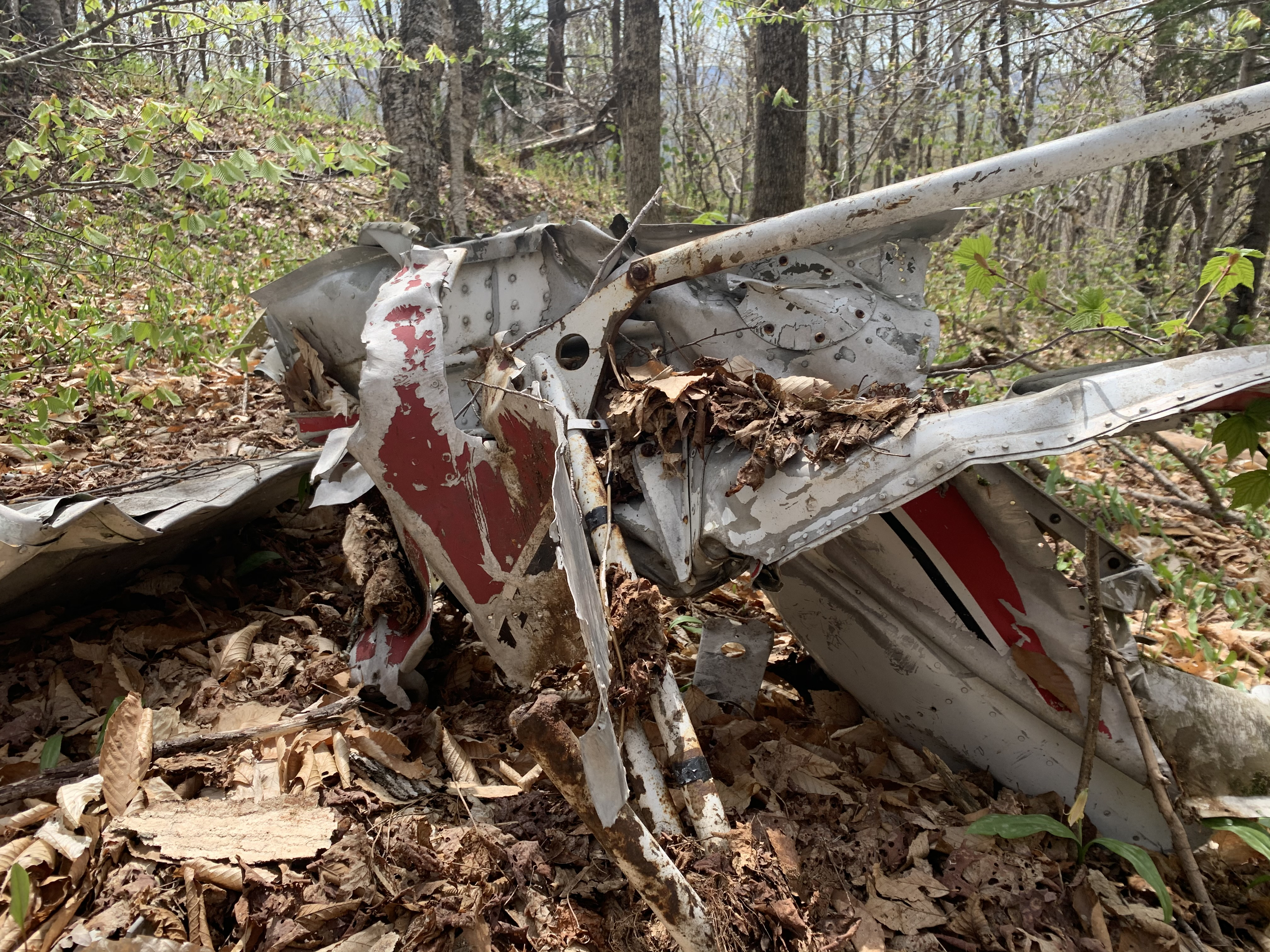
Wreckage of the flight. The plane sits about 100 feet beneath the peak of terrible mountain.

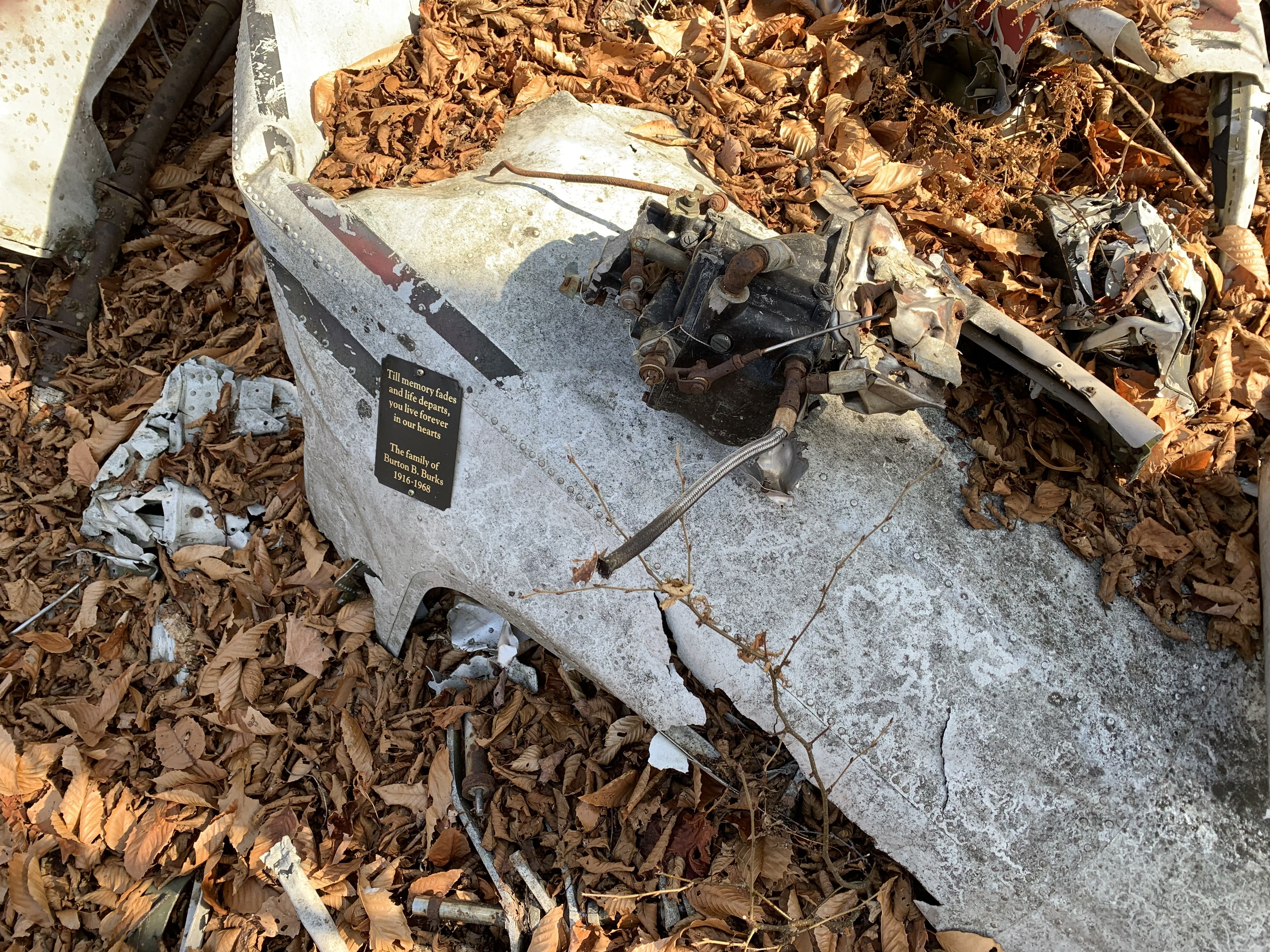
The plaque dedicated to Burton B. Burks in the wreckage of the plane.
