= Weston, Vermont =

- Town
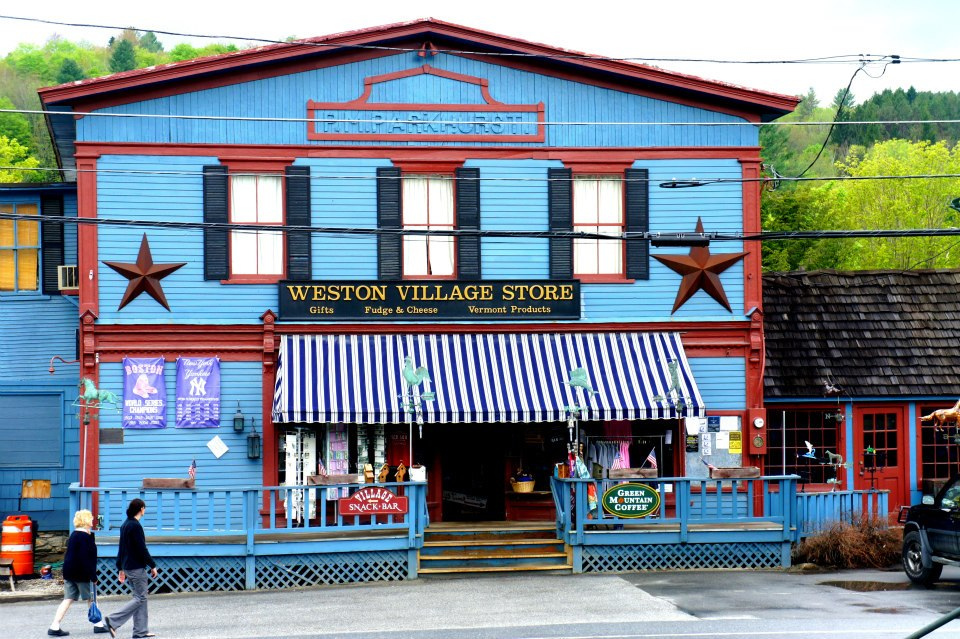
- Village Store in Weston

- Logo

- Location in Windsor County and the state of Vermont.
- Coordinates: 43°18′32″N 72°48′06″W
- Country: United States
- State: Vermont
- County: Windsor
- Chartered: 1799
- Communities: Weston; The Island

Area
  - Total: 35.2 sq mi (91.1 km^{2})
  - Land: 35.0 sq mi (90.6 km^{2})
  - Water: 0.19 sq mi (0.5 km^{2})
- Elevation: 1,831 ft (558 m)

Population (2020)
  - Total: 623
  - Density: 17.8/sq mi (6.88/km^{2})
- Time zone: UTC-5 (Eastern (EST))
  - Summer (DST): UTC-4 (EDT)
- ZIP code: 05161
- Area code: 802
- FIPS code: 50-82000
- GNIS feature ID: 1462255
- Website: www.westonvt.org

Weston is a town in Windsor County, Vermont, United States. The population was 623 at the 2020 census. Home to the Weston Playhouse Theatre Company, it includes the villages of Weston and The Island.

== History ==
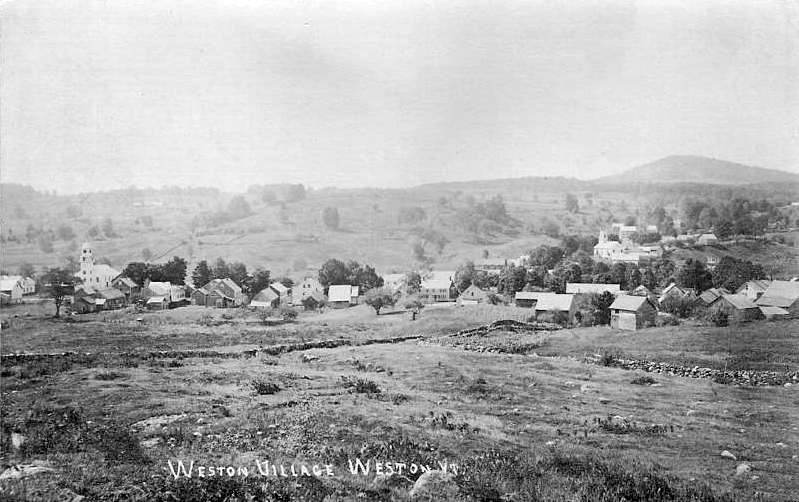
View of Weston village in 1908

Weston was originally the western part of Andover called West Town. Because Markham and Terrible Mountain blocked travel between the town's halves, it was set off and incorporated on October 26, 1799, by the legislature. Set among the Green Mountains, the terrain is very rough and mountainous, but the intervales provided good soil for agriculture and pasturage. A second village grew at the canal cut to divert the West River to power watermills. Called the Island, it developed into a small mill town.

By 1859, when Weston's population was 950, industries included ten sawmills, a gristmill, two tanneries, one wood-turning mill, one machine shop, one axe shop, one carding machine, in addition to shops for blacksmiths, carpenters, tinsmiths, wheelwrights and shoemakers. Vermont's oldest professional theatre, the Weston Playhouse Theatre Company, was founded in 1935. The Vermont Country Store, a catalogue, retail, and e-commerce business, was established here in 1946 by Vrest and Ellen Orton.

== Geography ==
According to the United States Census Bureau, the town has a total area of 35.2 square miles (91.1 km^{2}), of which 35.0 square miles (90.6 km^{2}) is land and 0.19 square miles (0.5 km^{2}), or 0.57%, is water. The West River flows through the town.

Weston is crossed by Vermont Route 100.

== Demographics ==
Historical population
Census	Pop.	Note	%±
1810	629		—
1820	890		41.5%
1830	972		9.2%
1840	1,032		6.2%
1850	950		−7.9%
1860	932		−1.9%
1870	931		−0.1%
1880	987		6.0%
1890	864		−12.5%
1900	756		−12.5%
1910	632		−16.4%
1920	436		−31.0%
1930	411		−5.7%
1940	457		11.2%
1950	468		2.4%
1960	442		−5.6%
1970	507		14.7%
1980	627		23.7%
1990	488		−22.2%
2000	630		29.1%
2010	566		−10.2%
2020	623		10.1%
U.S. Decennial Census

As of the census of 2010, there were 566 people, 283 households, and 174 families residing in the town. The population density was 16.0 people per square mile (6.2/km^{2}). There were 573 housing units at an average density of 16.3 per square mile (5.9/km^{2}). The racial makeup of the town was 98.1% White, 0.4% African American, 0% Native American, 0.7% Asian, and 0.9% from two or more races. Hispanic or Latino of any race were 2% of the population

There were 213 households, out of which 19.4% had children under the age of 18 living with them, 56.2% were married couples living together, 8.7% had a female householder with no husband present, and 33.5% were non-families. 29.8% of all households were made up of individuals, and 7.4% had someone living alone who was 65 years of age or older. The average household size was 2.16 and the average family size was 2.71.

In the town, the population was spread out, with 13.8% under the age of 18, 4.4% from 18 to 24, 13.6% from 25 to 44, 34.8% from 45 to 64, and 33.4% who were 65 years of age or older. The median age was 53.1 years. For every 100 females, there were 108.9 males. For every 100 females age 18 and over, there were 104.2 males.

The median income for a household in the town was $72,692, and the median income for a family was $84,821. Males had a median income of $38,854 versus $22,361 for females. The per capita income for the town was $36,546. About 2.5% of families and 8.1% of the population were below the poverty line, including 5.4% of those under age 18 and 8.4% of those age 65 or over.

== Sites of interest ==
- Vermont Country Store
- Farrar-Mansur House
- Weston Playhouse Theatre Company
- Weston Priory

== Notable people ==
- Aaron H. Cragin, US congressman and senator
- Joseph A. Gilmore, railroad superintendent and 29th governor of New Hampshire
- Sam Lloyd, television actor
- Peter Miller, photographer
- Mildred Ellen Orton, founder of the Vermont Country Store
- Hiram Sanford Stevens, US congressman
- Syd Straw, Singer & Actor / Residence
