= List of rivers of the Valparaíso Region =

The information regarding List of rivers in the Valparaíso Region on this page has been compiled from the data supplied by GeoNames. It includes all features named "Rio", "Canal", "Arroyo", "Estero" and those Feature Code is associated with a stream of water. (Note: The arbitrarily selected codes are RPDS, CHN, CNLA, CNLB, CNLD, CNLI, CNLN, CNLSB, CRKT, DTCH, DTCHI, DTCHD, ESTY, FORD, SBED, STM, STMA, STMB, STMC, STMD, STMH, STMI, STMIX, STMM, STMQ, STMS, STMSB, STMX, TNLC, WTRC, WTRH) This list contains 174 water streams.

== Content ==
This list contains:

1. Name of the stream, in Spanish Language
2. Coordinates are latitude and longitude of the feature in ± decimal degrees, at the mouth of the stream
3. Link to a map including the Geonameid (a number which uniquely identifies a Geoname feature)
4. Feature Code explained in
5. Other names for the same feature, if any
6. Basin countries additional to Chile, if any

== List ==
Maipo, Aconcagua and Petorca Rivers basins

- Estero de Pedernales • 32.1°S 70.81667°W • 3876920 • STM
- Canal de Las Vegas • 32.8°S 70.96667°W • 3883791 • DTCH
- Estero Yali • 33.76714°S 71.74721°W • 3867760 • STM • (Estero Yali, Estero de Yali)
- Río Maipo • 33.61305°S 71.62949°W • 3880983 • STM (see tributaries in List of rivers of the Santiago Metropolitan Region)
- Río Rapel • 33.90418°S 71.83147°W • 3873714 • STM
- Estero de Los Corralillos • 33.48333°S 71.45°W • 3882128 • STM • (Estero Corralillos, Estero Corrolillos, Estero de Los Corralillos) • (CL)
- Río Tilama • 32.07337°S 71.22489°W • 3869850 • STM
- Estero Raíces • 32.07944°S 70.99404°W • 3873848 • STM
- Cajón Infiernillo • 32.09329°S 71.30414°W • 3887214 • STM • (Cajon Infiernillo, Cajón Infiernillo, Estero Maquis)
- Río Pedernal • 32.20808°S 70.83102°W • 3876928 • STM • (Estero de Chaloco, Rio Pedernal, Río Pedernal)
- Río del Sobrante • 32.20943°S 70.83038°W • 3870778 • STM • (Rio Sobrante, Rio del Sobrante, Río Sobrante, Río del Sobrante)
- Río Sobrante • 32.21667°S 70.85°W • 3870779 • STM
- Estero Los Molles • 32.23967°S 71.49855°W • 3881731 • STM • (Estero Los Molles, Estero Molles)
- Estero de la Ballena • 32.26667°S 71.48333°W • 3898908 • STM
- Estero Manzano • 32.27396°S 71.47044°W • 3880614 • STM
- Estero el Ajial • 32.28225°S 71.24322°W • 3900318 • STM
- Estero Chincolco • 32.29638°S 70.59868°W • 3895016 • STM • (Estero Chincolco, Quebrada de Chincolco)
- Quebrada Los Riocitos • 32.31667°S 70.55°W • 3881409 • STM
- Estero Denquer • 32.31667°S 71.25°W • 3892648 • STM
- Estero Las Palmas • 32.32653°S 71.07423°W • 3884085 • STM
- Estero Guaquén • 32.34906°S 71.44397°W • 3888376 • STM • (Estero Guaquen, Estero Guaquén, Estero de Huaquen)
- Estero de la Canoa • 32.35°S 71.3°W • 3896900 • STMI
- Río Alicahue • 32.35°S 70.8°W • 3900094 • STM • (Estero Alicahue)
- Río Tambillos • 32.35871°S 70.31316°W • 3870194 • STM
- Canal Seco • 32.36667°S 71.16667°W • 3871065 • DTCH
- Río Petorca • 32.3873°S 71.3754°W • 3876414 • STM • (Rio Pelorca, Rio Petorca, Río Petorca)
- Río La Ligua • 32.40866°S 71.40488°W • 3885452 • STM • (Rio La Ligua, Rio de la Ligua, Río La Ligua, Río de la Ligua)
- Río Los Angeles • 32.43019°S 71.01924°W • 3882423 • STM • (Estero Cajon de Los Angeles, Estero Cajón de Los Ángeles, Estero Los Angeles, Estero de los Angeles, Estero de los Ángeles)
- Río de los Ángeles • 32.43333°S 71.03333°W • 3899640 • STM • (Estero de Los Anjeles, Estero de los Angeles, Estero de los Ángeles) • (CL)
- Canal de Longotoma • 32.4°S 71.1°W • 3882545 • DTCH
- Estero de Chacai • 32.4°S 70.56667°W • 3895790 • STMI
- Canal Valle Hermoso • 32.45°S 71.2°W • 3868638 • DTCH
- Estero El Espinal • 32.45°S 71.4°W • 3891382 • STM • (Estero El Espinal, Estero Espinal) • (CL)
- Estero El Pangue • 32.46222°S 71.37167°W • 3890833 • STM • (Estero El Pangue, Estero Pangue)
- Estero La Patagua • 32.46729°S 71.18083°W • 3885085 • STM • (Estero La Patagua, Estero Patagua)
- Estero de los Azules • 32.48538°S 70.18418°W • 3899021 • STM
- Río Portillo Hondo • 32.48573°S 70.18818°W • 3875374 • STM
- Estero La Patagua • 32.49162°S 71.00271°W • 3885084 • STM • (Estero La Patagua, Estero de la Patagua)
- Río Chalaco • 32.50067°S 70.5798°W • 3895629 • STM • (Estero Chalaco, Estero del Chaco)
- Río del Rocín • 32.50105°S 70.57922°W • 3872985 • STM
- Estero del Bolsillo • 32.50661°S 70.21387°W • 3898110 • STM
- Río Hidalgo • 32.50713°S 70.45464°W • 3888055 • STM
- Río Las Piedras • 32.51557°S 70.21831°W • 3884021 • STM
- Río Cajón de Los Ángeles • 32.51667°S 70.93333°W • 3897387 • STM • (Estero Cajon de Los Angeles, Estero Cajon de los Anjeles, Estero Cajón de Los Ángeles, Estero Cajón de los Anjeles, Quebrada Los Anjeles) • (CL)
- Estero Guayacán • 32.51907°S 70.92478°W • 3888314 • STM • (Estero Guayacan, Estero Guayacán, Esterro de Guayacan, Esterro de Guayacán)
- Río Blanco • 32.5232°S 70.22822°W • 3898216 • STM • (Estero Blanco, Estero Leiva, Rio Blanco, Río Blanco)
- Estero del Zorro • 32.52934°S 70.40531°W • 3867474 • STM
- Estero Columpios del Diablo • 32.52937°S 70.27782°W • 3893987 • STM
- Río Leiva • 32.54885°S 70.16603°W • 3883429 • STM
- Estero La Retamilla • 32.56168°S 71.2767°W • 3884787 • STM
- Estero El Blanquillo • 32.56192°S 71.27611°W • 3891885 • STM • (Estero Blanquillos, Estero El Blanquillo)
- Estero de Coligue • 32.57607°S 71.30994°W • 3894261 • STM
- Río Tierras Blancas • 32.57693°S 71.31462°W • 3869869 • STM
- Estero El Tordillo • 32.59125°S 70.28787°W • 3890277 • STM
- Estero Las Minillas • 32.60917°S 70.73928°W • 3884155 • STM • (Estero Las Minillas, Quebrada Las Minillas)
- Quebrada de La Canela • 32.62692°S 71.41544°W • 3886359 • STM • (Estero La Canela, Quebrada de La Canela)
- Estero Catapilco • 32.63251°S 71.42676°W • 3896172 • STM
- Estero de Las Lagunillas • 32.63702°S 70.31034°W • 3884268 • STM
- Río Casas Viejas • 32.6°S 71.38333°W • 3896333 • STMI
- Estero El Gallo • 32.65638°S 71.15503°W • 3891332 • STM
- Estero El Sauce • 32.6575°S 71.15522°W • 3890379 • STM
- Estero del Tocadillo • 32.65793°S 70.23256°W • 3869733 • STM
- Río Gómez • 32.66374°S 70.93146°W • 3888932 • STM • (Cajon de Gomez, Cajón de Gómez, Estero de Gomez, Estero de Gómez)
- Estero de Las Cabritas • 32.66667°S 70.75°W • 3884569 • STM • (Estero Cabritas, Estero de Las Cabritas) • (CL)
- Estero La Laviera • 32.67226°S 71.21707°W • 3885490 • STM
- Estero El Cobre • 32.67275°S 71.21659°W • 3891588 • STM • (Estero El Cobre, Estero del Cobre)
- Estero El Carretón • 32.70093°S 71.2093°W • 3891697 • STM • (Estero El Carretero, Estero El Carreton, Estero El Carretón, Estero del Carreton, Estero del Carretón)
- Estero San Regis • 32.71667°S 70.73333°W • 3871725 • STM
- Canal San Miguel • 32.71667°S 70.65°W • 3871900 • DTCH
- Estero Jahuel • 32.71852°S 70.64412°W • 3887000 • STM
- Río de Los Leones • 32.72838°S 70.24135°W • 3881952 • STM • (Rio Leones, Rio de Los Leones, Rio de los Leones, Río Leones, Río de Los Leones, Río de los Leones)
- Estero de la Cañada • 32.72851°S 70.24086°W • 3897044 • STM
- Río Seco • 32.72994°S 70.77479°W • 3871061 • STM
- Estero Quilpué • 32.73278°S 70.76244°W • 3874094 • STM
- Estero del Saíno • 32.73958°S 70.64°W • 3872639 • STM
- Estero El Cobre • 32.7411°S 70.64942°W • 3891587 • STM • (Estero El Cobre, Estero del Cobre, Quebrada El Cobre)
- Río San Francisco • 32.74144°S 70.64944°W • 3872218 • STM • (Estero San Francisco, Quebrada San Francisco)
- Estero Campiche • 32.7525°S 71.48583°W • 3950060 • STM • (Estero Campiche, Estero Compiche)
- Canal Nogales • 32.75358°S 71.15691°W • 3878573 • DTCH
- Canal El Monte • 32.75°S 70.58333°W • 3890946 • DTCH
- Estero de La Gloria • 32.75458°S 70.2849°W • 3885863 • STM • (Estero de La Gloria, Estero de la Gloria)
- Estero de Los Riecillos • 32.75584°S 70.30187°W • 3881413 • STM
- Estero Melón • 32.75987°S 71.18582°W • 3880085 • STM
- Canal Calvino • 32.76667°S 70.56667°W • 3897201 • DTCH
- Estero Pucalán • 32.76945°S 71.39256°W • 3875110 • STM
- Canal Huidobro • 32.77921°S 70.95842°W • 3887561 • DTCH • (Canal Guidobro, Canal Huidobro)
- Canal de Purutún • 32.78333°S 71.15°W • 3874573 • DTCH
- Canal Mazzino • 32.78333°S 71.16667°W • 3880259 • DTCH
- Estero Chilicauquén • 32.78513°S 71.4135°W • 3895102 • STM
- Estero Pocuro • 32.81667°S 70.55°W • 3875556 • STM
- Canal de Mena • 32.83333°S 71.18333°W • 3880063 • DTCH
- Canal Hurtadino • 32.83333°S 70.55°W • 3887428 • DTCH
- Canal El Melón • 32.83824°S 71.10196°W • 3891045 • DTCH • (Canal El Melon, Canal El Melón, Canal el Melon, Canal el Melón, Estero del Melon)
- Estero Los Mayos • 32.8°S 71.43333°W • 3881768 • STMI • (Estero Los Magos, Estero Los Mayos) • (CL)
- Canal El Salero • 32.8°S 70.56667°W • 3890453 • DTCH
- Canal Coquimbito • 32.83921°S 71.10314°W • 3893632 • DTCH
- Estero La Gloria • 32.84561°S 71.13005°W • 3885864 • STM • (Estero La Gloria, Estero de la Gloria)
- Río Casa de Piedra • 32.84649°S 70.36289°W • 3896383 • STM
- Estero de Rabuco • 32.84837°S 71.1207°W • 3873878 • STM
- Canal Lorino • 32.85008°S 70.87828°W • 3882481 • DTCH
- Estero de Rapaculo • 32.85°S 71.01667°W • 3873722 • STM
- Estero Los Chinos • 32.85°S 71.13333°W • 3882211 • STMA
- Canal Comunero • 32.85°S 70.95°W • 3893938 • DTCH
- Estero del Maitén • 32.85429°S 70.39235°W • 3880966 • STM
- Estero Ojo de Agua • 32.86422°S 70.17346°W • 3878143 • STM
- Río Juncalillo • 32.86542°S 70.15727°W • 3886714 • STM
- Estero de la Cuesta • 32.86826°S 70.68938°W • 3893136 • STMI
- Canal Pachacama • 32.87972°S 71.15809°W • 3877842 • DTCH
- Estero del Peñón • 32.88333°S 70.21667°W • 3876622 • STM
- Estero Quintero • 32.88587°S 71.51137°W • 3873981 • STM • (Estero Quintero, Estero de Quintero)
- Canal Valdés • 32.88994°S 70.96466°W • 3868724 • DTCH
- Río Potrero Escondido • 32.90471°S 70.11534°W • 3875278 • STM
- Estero Mardones • 32.91459°S 70.09398°W • 3880528 • STM
- Río Aconcagua • 32.91535°S 71.50754°W • 3900683 • STM • (Rio Aconcagua, Río Aconcagua)

- Estero Limache • 32.92621°S 71.44803°W • 3883213 • STM • (Estero Limache, Estero de Limache)
- Estero de Los Litres • 32.77578°S 71.21328°W • 3881929 • STM
- Estero Los Loros • 32.84172°S 71.00447°W • 3881887 • STM • (Estero Los Loros)
- Estero Catemu • 32.79839°S 70.98999°W • 3896160 • STM • (Estero Catemu)
- Estero Quilpué • 33.0468°S 71.47722°W • 3874093 • STM

- Río Putaendo • 32.73175°S 70.76048°W • 3874568 • STM

- Estero Pocuro • 32.76408°S 70.7317°W • 3875557 • STM • (Estero Pocuro)
- Río Colorado • 32.8549°S 70.39263°W • 3894032 • STM

- Río Juncal • 32.91688°S 70.09649°W • 3886721 • STM
- Río Blanco • 32.90944°S 70.30071°W • 3898215 • STM

- Estero de Navarro • 32.91697°S 70.09387°W • 3878986 • STM • (Cajon de Navarro, Estero de Navarro, Quebrada de Navarro, Rio Navarro, Río Navarro)
- Estero de las Hualtatas • 32.92252°S 70.35561°W • 3887780 • STM • (Estero de las Gualtatas, Estero de las Hualtatas)
- Estero Riecillos • 32.92308°S 70.35504°W • 3873318 • STM
- Estero de la Polvareda • 32.93148°S 70.28166°W • 3875480 • STM • (Estero de Las Polvaredas, Estero de la Polvareda)
- Estero San Pedro • 32.93333°S 71.33333°W • 3871810 • STM
- Estero de Las Polvaredas • 32.93333°S 70.3°W • 3883989 • STM
- Estero San Isidro • 32.93674°S 71.33273°W • 3872165 • STM
- Estero Namica • 32.96667°S 71.53333°W • 3879065 • STM
- Río de los Leones • 32.96781°S 70.26307°W • 3883331 • STM • (Rio de Los Leones, Rio de los Leones, Río de Los Leones, Río de los Leones)
- Estero Monos de Agua • 32.9694°S 70.10757°W • 3879496 • STM
- Estero Reñaca • 32.97324°S 71.54439°W • 3965376 • STM
- Estero de Manantiales • 32.98333°S 70.35°W • 3880756 • STM
- Estero Pelumpén • 32.9923°S 71.28574°W • 3876738 • STM
- Estero Lliu-Lliu • 32.99915°S 71.25617°W • 3882871 • STM
- Canal Waddington • 33.00013°S 71.17633°W • 3867952 • DTCH
- Canal Waddington • 33.00717°S 71.17138°W • 3867953 • DTCH
- Estero Marga Marga • 33.02056°S 71.56139°W • 3880522 • STM
- Estero Potrero Escondido • 33.03048°S 70.25253°W • 3875277 • STM
- Estero Gallardo • 33.03935°S 70.25485°W • 3889187 • STM
- Estero de Las Palmas • 33.07012°S 71.4664°W • 3884079 • STM • (Estero de Las Palmas, Estero de las Palmas)
- Estero Flores • 33.07149°S 70.25522°W • 3889434 • STM
- Estero de Moscoso • 33.09151°S 71.40363°W • 3879269 • STM
- Estero del Carrizo • 33.158°S 71.31248°W • 3896450 • STM
- Estero de Los Colihues • 33.15946°S 71.29983°W • 3882168 • STMI
- Estero del Fullero • 33.16041°S 71.30061°W • 3889241 • STM
- Estero de Moteros • 33.25779°S 71.61576°W • 3879245 • STM
- Estero Casablanca • 33.27884°S 71.66263°W • 3896409 • STM • (Estero Casablanca, Estero de Casablanca)
- Estero de Lo Ovalle • 33.30773°S 71.42807°W • 3882516 • STM • (Estero Lo Oralle, Estero de Lo Ovalle)
- Estero La Playa • 33.3°S 71.46667°W • 3884966 • STM • (Estero La Playa, Rio La Playa, Río La Playa) • (CL)
- Estero El Membrillo • 33.34521°S 71.65045°W • 3891034 • STM • (Estero El Membrillo, Estero del Membrillo, Rio del Membrillo, Río del Membrillo)
- Estero San Jerónimo • 33.35569°S 71.65653°W • 3872145 • STM
- Estero de Lo Orrego • 33.39301°S 71.50096°W • 3882524 • STM • (Arroyo de Orrego, Estero de Lo Orrego, Estero de Lo Orrego Abajo)
- Estero Huallilemu • 33.41667°S 71.71667°W • 3887782 • STM • (Estero Guallelemu, Estero Huallilemu, Estero de Guallilemo) • (CL)
- Estero del Totoral • 33.42133°S 71.69889°W • 3869435 • STM
- Estero Carvajal • 33.42847°S 71.62781°W • 3896419 • STM • (Estero Carrajal, Estero Carvajal, Estero de Carvajal)
- Estero del Rosario • 33.44553°S 71.67765°W • 3872814 • STM • (Estero El Rosario, Estero del Rosario)
- Estero de las Lagunillas • 33.47196°S 71.47987°W • 3885721 • STM
- Estero de la Cigüeña • 33.52066°S 71.60669°W • 3894638 • STM
- Estero de Lo Abarca • 33.52742°S 71.54845°W • 3882819 • STM
- Estero de Cartagena • 33.53063°S 71.60246°W • 3896428 • STM
- Estero de la Viña • 33.54935°S 71.47728°W • 3868123 • STM • (Estero de La Vina, Estero de La Viña, Estero de la Vina, Estero de la Viña)
- Estero de Las Palmas • 33.55001°S 71.47686°W • 3884078 • STM
- Estero Llolleo • 33.61528°S 71.62222°W • 3965500 • STM
- Estero de El Sauce • 33.61866°S 71.6234°W • 3890378 • STM
- Estero de Leyda • 33.63345°S 71.53555°W • 3883292 • STM
- Estero de San Juan • 33.64567°S 71.55731°W • 3872021 • STM
- Estero de Ñanco • 33.64658°S 71.55665°W • 3879052 • STM
- Estero Maitenlahue • 33.8362°S 71.81316°W • 3880919 • STM

== See also ==
- List of lakes in Chile
- List of volcanoes in Chile
- List of islands of Chile
- List of fjords, channels, sounds and straits of Chile
- List of lighthouses in Chile
