= 1967 Alpine Skiing World Cup – Women's overall =

1967 Women's overall World Cup
Previous: none	Next: 1968

Women's overall World Cup 1966/1967

== Final point standings ==
In women's overall World Cup 1966/67 the best three downhills, best three giant slaloms and best three slaloms count. Deductions are given in ().

Place	Name	Country	Total; Points	Total; Deduction	Downhill		Giant; Slalom		Slalom
1	Nancy Greene	Canada	176	(40)	36		75	(40)	65
2	Marielle Goitschel	France	172	(49)	56		46	(18)	70	(31)
3	Annie Famose	France	158	(61)	38		50	(11)	70	(50)
4	Isabelle Mir	France	115	(10)	47		22	(2)	46	(8)
5	Florence Steurer	France	114	(14)	34	(4)	39	(10)	41
6	Erika Schinegger	Austria	110	(11)	40		65	(11)	5
7	Burgl Färbinger	West Germany	65		5		22		38
	Traudl Hecher	Austria	65	(6)	13		20	(4)	32	(2)
9	Giustina Demetz	Italy	64	(1)	42	(1)	15		7
10	Christine Béranger	France	48		0		37		11
11	Fernande Bochatay	Switzerland	39		0		19		20
12	Inge Jochum	Austria	30		8		22		0
13	Penny McCoy	United States	25		0		3		22
14	Gina Hathorn	United Kingdom	23		0		0		23
15	Annerösli Zryd	Switzerland	22		22		0		0
16	Suzy Chaffee	United States	21		12		4		5
	Edith Zimmermann	Austria	21	(1)	5		14	(1)	2
18	Gertrude Gabl	Austria	20		0		2		18
19	Ruth Hildebrand	Switzerland	15	(1)	0		0		15	(1)
	Olga Pall	Austria	15		6		4		5
21	Glorianda Cipolla	Italy	14	(4)	0		0		14	(4)
22	Madeleine Wuilloud	Switzerland	12		4		8		0
23	Christl Haas	Austria	11		0		0		11
	Rosi Fortna	United States	11		0		0		11
25	Ruth Adolf	Switzerland	8		0		4		4
	J. Mathieson	Canada	8		0		0		8
27	Rosi Mittermaier	West Germany	6		0		0		6
	Margret Hafen	West Germany	6		6		0		0
	Kiki Cutter	United States	6		0		0		6
	Lee Hall	United States	6		0		2		4
31	Robin Morning	United States	3		0		0		3
	Bernadette Rauter	Austria	3		0		0		3
	Marie France Jean-Georges	France	3		3		0		0
	Vikki Jones	United States	3		0		0		3
35	Lotte Nogler	Italy	2		2		0		0
	Karen Korfanta	United States	2		0		0		2
37	Jacqueline Rouvier	France	1		1		0		0

Alpine skiing World Cup
Women

Overall | Downhill | Giant slalom | Slalom

1967
