= 1967 Alpine Skiing World Cup – Women's giant slalom =

1968 Women's giant slalom World Cup
Previous: none	Next: 1969

Women's giant slalom World Cup 1966/1967

== Calendar ==
Round	Race No	Place	Country	Date	Winner	Second	Third
1	2	Oberstaufen	West Germany	January 8, 1967	(Canada) Nancy Greene	(West Germany) Burgl Färbinger	(Switzerland) Fernande Bochatay
2	4	Grindelwald	Switzerland	January 11, 1967	(Canada) Nancy Greene	(France) Annie Famose	(France) Marielle Goitschel
3	9	St. Gervais	France	January 28, 1967	(Austria) Erika Schinegger	(France) Marielle Goitschel	(France) Annie Famose
4	13	Franconia	United States	March 11, 1967	(France) Christine Béranger	(France) Florence Steurer	(Canada) Nancy Greene
5	15	Vail	United States	March 19, 1967	(Canada) Nancy Greene	(Austria) Erika Schinegger	(France) Annie Famose
6	16	Jackson Hole	United States	March 24, 1967	(Canada) Nancy Greene	(Austria) Erika Schinegger	(Austria) Traudl Hecher

== Final point standings ==
In women's giant slalom World Cup 1966/67 the best 3 results count. Deductions are given in ().

Place	Name	Country	Total points	Deduction	2 (Germany)	4 (Switzerland)	9 (France)	13 (United States)	15 (United States)	16 (United States)
1	Nancy Greene	Canada	75	(40)	25	25	-	(15)	25	(25)
2	Erika Schinegger	Austria	65	(11)	-	-	25	(11)	20	20
3	Annie Famose	France	50	(11)	-	20	15	(3)	15	(8)
4	Marielle Goitschel	France	46	(18)	(8)	15	20	(4)	(6)	11
5	Florence Steurer	France	39	(10)	(6)	8	11	20	(4)	-
6	Christine Béranger	France	37		-	11	-	25	1	-
7	Burgl Färbinger	West Germany	22		20	2	-	-	-	-
	Inge Jochum	Austria	22		11	-	-	-	11	-
	Isabelle Mir	France	22	(2)	(2)	-	8	-	8	6
10	Traudl Hecher	Austria	20	(4)	3	-	2	(2)	(2)	15
11	Fernande Bochatay	Switzerland	19		15	4	-	-	-	-
12	Giustina Demetz	Italy	15		-	6	-	6	-	3
13	Edith Zimmermann	Austria	14	(1)	-	3	(1)	8	3	-
14	Madeleine Wuilloud	Switzerland	8		1	1	6	-	-	-
15	Ruth Adolf	Switzerland	4		4	-	-	-	-	-
	Suzy Chaffee	United States	4		-	-	4	-	-	-
	Olga Pall	Austria	4		-	-	-	-	-	4
18	Penny McCoy	United States	3		-	-	3	-	-	-
19	Gertrude Gabl	Austria	2		-	-	-	-	-	2
	Lee Hall	United States	2		-	-	-	1	-	1

== Women's giant slalom team results ==
All points were shown including individual deduction. bold indicate highest score - italics indicate race wins

Place	Country	Total points	2 (Germany)	4 (Switzerland)	9 (France)	13 (United States)	15 (United States)	16 (United States)	Racers	Wins
1	France	235	16	**54**	**54**	52	34	25	5	1
2	Austria	143	14	3	28	21	36	41	6	1
3	Canada	115	25	25	-	15	25	25	1	4
4	Switzerland	31	20	5	6	-	-	-	3	0
5	West Germany	22	20	2	-	-	-	-	1	0
6	Italy	15	-	6	-	6	-	3	1	0
7	United States	9	-	-	7	1	-	1	3	0

**Alpine skiing World Cup**
**Women**

Overall | Downhill | Giant slalom | Slalom

**1967**
