= 1967 Alpine Skiing World Cup – Women's slalom =

1967 Women's slalom World Cup
Previous: none	Next: 1968

Women's slalom World Cup 1966/1967

== Calendar ==
Round	Race No	Place	Country	Date	Winner	Second	Third
1	1	Oberstaufen	West Germany	January 7, 1967	(Canada) Nancy Greene	(Switzerland) Fernande Bochatay	(France) Annie Famose
2	3	Grindelwald	Switzerland	January 10, 1967	(France) Annie Famose	(United Kingdom) Gina Hathorn	(France) Isabelle Mir
3	7	Schruns	Austria	January 19, 1967	(France) Marielle Goitschel	(France) Annie Famose	(Canada) Nancy Greene
4	8	St. Gervais	France	January 26, 1967	(France) Annie Famose	(France) Marielle Goitschel	(France) Florence Steurer
5	10	Monte Bondone	Italy	February 1, 1967	(West Germany) Burgl Färbinger	(France) Annie Famose	(Austria) Traudl Hecher
6	14	Franconia	United States	March 12, 1967	(France) Marielle Goitschel	(France) Isabelle Mir	(France) Annie Famose
7	17	Jackson Hole	United States	March 27, 1967	(Canada) Nancy Greene	(France) Marielle Goitschel	(France) Florence Steurer

== Final point standings ==
In women's slalom World Cup 1966/67 the best 3 results count. Deductions are given in ().

Place	Name	Country	Total points	Deduction	1 (Germany)	3 (Switzerland)	7 (Austria)	8 (France)	10 (Italy)	14 (United States)	17 (United States)
1	Annie Famose	France	70	(50)	(15)	25	20	25	(20)	(15)	-
	Marielle Goitschel	France	70	(31)	-	(11)	25	20	-	25	(20)
3	Nancy Greene	Canada	65		25	-	15	-	-	-	25
4	Isabelle Mir	France	46	(8)	-	15	-	(8)	-	20	11
5	Florence Steurer	France	41		11	-	-	15	-	-	15
6	Burgl Färbinger	West Germany	38		2	-	11	-	25	-	-
7	Traudl Hecher	Austria	32	(2)	6	(2)	-	11	15	-	-
8	Gina Hathorn	United Kingdom	23		-	20	-	-	3	-	-
9	Penny McCoy	United States	22		-	8	-	6	-	8	-
10	Fernande Bochatay	Switzerland	20		20	-	-	-	-	-	-
11	Gertrude Gabl	Austria	18		-	-	8	-	8	-	2
12	Ruth Hildebrand	Switzerland	15	(1)	3	(1)	6	-	-	6	-
13	Glorianda Cipolla	Italy	14	(4)	-	6	4	4	(4)	-	-
14	Christine Béranger	France	11		8	3	-	-	-	-	-
	Christl Haas	Austria	11		-	-	-	-	11	-	-
	Rosi Fortna	United States	11		-	-	-	-	-	11	-
17	J. Mathieson	Canada	8		-	-	-	-	-	-	8
18	Giustina Demetz	Italy	7		-	-	2	-	1	-	4
19	Rosi Mittermaier	West Germany	6		-	-	-	-	6	-	-
	Kiki Cutter	United States	6		-	-	-	-	-	-	6
21	Olga Pall	Austria	5		-	-	-	3	2	-	-
	Suzy Chaffee	United States	5		-	-	-	1	-	4	-
	Erika Schinegger	Austria	5		4	-	-	-	-	-	1
24	Ruth Adolf	Switzerland	4		-	4	-	-	-	-	-
	Lee Hall	United States	4		-	-	-	-	-	1	3
26	Robin Morning	United States	3		-	-	3	-	-	-	-
	Bernadette Rauter	Austria	3		-	-	1	2	-	-	-
	Vikki Jones	United States	3		-	-	-	-	-	3	-
29	Edith Zimmermann	Austria	2		2	-	-	-	-	-	-
	Karen Korfanta	United States	2		-	-	-	-	-	2	-

== Women's slalom team results ==
All points were shown including individual deduction. bold indicate highest score - italics indicate race wins

Place	Country	Total points	1 (Germany)	3 (Switzerland)	7 (Austria)	8 (France)	10 (Italy)	14 (United States)	17 (United States)	Racers	Wins
1	France	327	34	54	45	**68**	20	60	46	5	4
2	Austria	78	12	2	9	16	36	-	3	7	0
3	Canada	73	25	-	15	-	-	-	33	2	2
4	United States	56	-	8	3	7	-	29	9	8	0
5	West Germany	44	2	-	11	-	31	-	-	2	1
6	Switzerland	40	23	5	6	-	-	6	-	3	0
7	Italy	25	-	6	6	4	5	-	4	2	0
8	United Kingdom	23	-	20	-	-	3	-	-	1	0

**Alpine skiing World Cup**
**Women**

Overall | Downhill | Giant slalom | Slalom

**1967**
