= 1967 Alpine Skiing World Cup – Women's downhill =

1967 Women's downhill World Cup
Previous: none	Next: 1968

Women's downhill World Cup 1966/1967

== Calendar ==
Round	Race No	Place	Country	Date	Winner	Second	Third
1	5	Grindelwald	Switzerland	January 13, 1967	(Canada) Nancy Greene	(France) Isabelle Mir	(France) Florence Steurer
2	6	Schruns	Austria	January 18, 1967	(France) Marielle Goitschel	(Austria) Erika Schinegger	(France) Annie Famose
3	11	Sestriere	Italy	March 3, 1967	(France) Marielle Goitschel (Italy) Giustina Demetz		(France) Florence Steurer
4	12	Franconia	United States	March 10, 1967	(France) Isabelle Mir	(Austria) Erika Schinegger	(France) Annie Famose

== Final point standings ==
In women's downhill World Cup 1966/67 the best 3 results count. Deductions are given in ().

Place	Name	Country	Total points	Deduction	5 (Switzerland)	6 (Austria)	11 (Italy)	12 (United States)
1	Marielle Goitschel	France	56		6	25	25	-
2	Isabelle Mir	France	47		20	2	-	25
3	Giustina Demetz	Italy	42	(1)	11	(1)	25	6
4	Erika Schinegger	Austria	40		-	20	-	20
5	Annie Famose	France	38		-	15	8	15
6	Nancy Greene	Canada	36		25	11	-	-
7	Florence Steurer	France	34	(4)	15	4	15	(4)
8	Annerösli Zryd	Switzerland	22		-	-	11	11
9	Traudl Hecher	Austria	13		3	8	-	2
10	Suzy Chaffee	United States	12		8	3	-	1
11	Inge Jochum	Austria	8		-	-	-	8
12	Olga Pall	Austria	6		-	6	-	-
	Margret Hafen	West Germany	6		-	-	6	-
14	Edith Zimmermann	Austria	5		2	-	-	3
	Burgl Färbinger	West Germany	5		1	-	4	-
16	Madeleine Wuilloud	Switzerland	4		4	-	-	-
17	Marie France Jean-Georges	France	3		-	-	3	-
18	Lotte Nogler	Italy	2		-	-	2	-
19	Jacqueline Rouvier	France	1		-	-	1	-

== Women's downhill team results ==
All points were shown including individual deduction. bold indicate highest score - italics indicate race wins

Place	Country	Total points	5 (Switzerland)	6 (Austria)	11 (Italy)	22 (United States)	Racers	Wins
1	France	183	41	46	**52**	44	6	3
2	Austria	72	5	34	-	33	5	0
3	Italy	45	11	1	27	6	2	1
4	Canada	36	25	11	-	-	1	1
5	Switzerland	26	4	-	11	11	2	0
6	United States	12	8	3	-	1	1	0
7	West Germany	11	1	-	10	-	2	0

Note:

The third race saw two winners, one from France and one from Italy.

**Alpine skiing World Cup**
**Women**

Overall | Downhill | Giant slalom | Slalom

**1967**
