= Aconcagua River =

River in northern Chile

Coordinates: 32°54′54″S 71°30′30″W

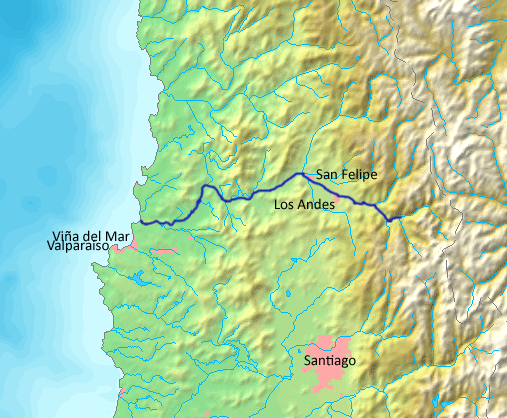

Location
- Country: Chile

Physical characteristics
- Source
  - elevation: 1,430 m (4,690 ft)
- Mouth
  - location: Pacific Ocean
- Length: 142 km (88 mi)
- Basin size: 7,340 km^{2} (2,830 sq mi)

Aconcagua and Maipo rivers

The Aconcagua River is a river in Chile that rises from the conflux of two minor tributary rivers at 1,430 metres (4,690 ft) above sea level in the Andes, Juncal River from the east (which rise in the Nevado Juncal) and Blanco River from the south east. The Aconcagua river flows westward through the broad Aconcagua valley and enters the Pacific Ocean near the city of Concon, 20 kilometres (12 mi) north of Valparaíso.

The river has a course of about 142 kilometres (88 mi), and its waters irrigate the most populous sections of the Chilean provinces of San Felipe de Aconcagua and Los Andes, being the most important economic resource of those regions. During the course of the Aconcagua river, it receives contributions from many others rivers and swamps, reaching a mean flow of 39 cubic metres per second (1,400 cu ft/s).

The Aconcagua River valley was used as the route of the Transandine Railway on the Chilean side. The river flows alongside Chile Route 5 from Llaillay to La Calera. For much of their lengths, the two separate stretches of Chile Route 60 follow the course of the river.

Although it has the same name, the Aconcagua river does not rise in the slopes of Aconcagua, which is entirely in Argentina about 20 kilometres (12 mi) from the beginning of the river, in Chilean territory.

The invasive plant species Limnobium laevigatum is present in the river.

== Tributaries ==
- Colorado River
- Estero Pocuro
- Putaendo River
- Estero Quilpué
- Estero Catemu
- Estero Los Loros
- Estero Los Litres
- Estero Limache
