= FIS Alpine World Ski Championships 1966 =

Skiing event in Portillo, Chile

Coordinates: 32.836°S 70.129°W

- Host city: Portillo, Valparaíso near Los Andes
- Country: Chile
- Events: 6
- Opening: 4 August 1966
- Closing: 14 August 1966
- Opened by: Eduardo Frei Montalva
- Main venue: Portillo

The FIS Alpine World Ski Championships 1966 were held in South America from 4 to 14 August at Portillo, Chile.

It remains the only alpine world championships contested in the Southern Hemisphere. It took place well out of the established season, nearly five months before the first World Cup season, which began in early January 1967.

Assignment came at the FIS-Congress at Athens in May 1963, but West Germany, Switzerland, and Austria voted against.

The French team won seven of the eight individual titles, seven silver medals, and two bronze to garner sixteen of the 24 medals.

== Men's competitions ==
Location in South America

=== Downhill ===
Sunday, 7 August

Place	Athlete	Country	Time	Diff.
1st place, gold medalist(s)	Jean Claude Killy	France (FRA)	1:34.40	—
2nd place, silver medalist(s)	Léo Lacroix	France (FRA)	1:34.80	+ 0.40
3rd place, bronze medalist(s)	Franz Vogler	West Germany (FRG)	1:35.16	+ 0.76
4	Heinrich Messner	Austria (AUT)	1:36.02	+ 1.62
5	Pierre Stamos	France (FRA)	1:36.12	+ 1.72
6	Bernard Orcel	France (FRA)	1:36.38	+ 1.98
7	Gerhard Nenning	Austria (AUT)	1:36.50	+ 2.10
8	Hans Peter Rohr	Switzerland (SUI)	1:36.52	+ 2.12
9	Karl Schranz	Austria (AUT)	1:36.53	+ 2.13
10	Stephan Sodat	Austria (AUT)	1:36.66	+ 2.26

=== Giant slalom ===
Location in the Andes

Tuesday, 9 August (run 1)
Wednesday, 10 August (run 2)

Place	Athlete	Country	Time	Diff.
1st place, gold medalist(s)	Guy Périllat	France (FRA)	3:19.42	—
2nd place, silver medalist(s)	Georges Mauduit	France (FRA)	3:19.93	+ 0.51
3rd place, bronze medalist(s)	Karl Schranz	Austria (AUT)	3:20.40	+ 0.98
4	Jakob Tischhauser	Switzerland (SUI)	3:20.90	+ 1.48
5	Jean-Claude Killy	France (FRA)	3:21.42	+ 2.00
6	Willy Favre	Switzerland (SUI)	3:23.02	+ 3.60
7	Werner Bleiner	Austria (AUT)	3:23.48	+ 4.06
8	Dumeng Giovanoli	Switzerland (SUI)	3:24.13	+ 4.71
9	Léo Lacroix	France (FRA)	3:24.39	+ 4.97
10	Heini Messner	Austria (AUT)	3:25.33	+ 5.91

- Killy led after the first run, with Périllat next, 0.21 seconds back.

=== Slalom ===
Sunday, 14 August

Place	Athlete	Country	Time	Diff.
1st place, gold medalist(s)	Carlo Senoner	Italy (ITA)	1:41.56	—
2nd place, silver medalist(s)	Guy Périllat	France (FRA)	1:42.25	+ 0.69
3rd place, bronze medalist(s)	Louis Jauffret	France (FRA)	1:42.58	+ 1.02
4	Willy Bogner	West Germany (FRG)	1:43.06	+ 1.50
5	Ludwig Leitner	West Germany (FRG)	1:43.07	+ 1.51
6	Jimmie Heuga	United States (USA)	1:43.69	+ 2.13
7	Giovanni Dibona	Italy (ITA)	1:43.82	+ 2.26
8	Jean-Claude Killy	France (FRA)	1:44.40	+ 2.84
9	Håkon Mjøen	Norway (NOR)	1:44.74	+ 3.18
10	Rune Lindström	Sweden (SWE)	1:44.86	+ 3.30

- Périllat led after the first run, with Senoner next, 0.58 seconds back.

=== Combined ===
Place	Athlete	Country	Points	DH	GS	SL
1st place, gold medalist(s)	Jean Claude Killy	France (FRA)	20.92	1st place, gold medalist(s)	5	8
2nd place, silver medalist(s)	Léo Lacroix	France (FRA)	42.13	2nd place, silver medalist(s)	9	18
3rd place, bronze medalist(s)	Ludwig Leitner	West Germany (FRG)	54.95	16	17	5
4	Jimmie Heuga	United States (USA)	56.71	19	13	6
5	Willy Favre	Switzerland (SUI)	69.61	26	6	19
6	Ivo Mahlknecht	Italy (ITA)	72.96	13	14	—
7	Scott Henderson	Canada (CAN)	86.67	24	11	—
8	Felice De Nicolo	Italy (ITA)	89.11	27	15	21
9	Andrzej Bachleda	Poland (POL)	100.36	39	21	15
10	Willi Lesch	West Germany (FRG)	100.42	35	30	11

At the World Championships from 1954 through 1980, the combined was a "paper race" using the results of the three events (DH, GS, SL).

== Women's competitions ==
=== Downhill ===
Monday, 8 August

Place	Athlete	Country	Time	Diff.
1st place, gold medalist(s)	Marielle Goitschel	France (FRA)	1:33.42	—
2nd place, silver medalist(s)	Annie Famose	France (FRA)	1:34.36	+ 0.94
3rd place, bronze medalist(s)	Burgl Färbinger	West Germany (FRG)	1:34.38	+ 0.96
4	Suzy Chaffee	United States (USA)	1:34.77	+ 1.35
5	Christl Haas	Austria (AUT)	1:34.81	+ 1.39
6	Giustina Demetz	Italy (ITA)	1:34.94	+ 1.52
7	Margret Hafen	West Germany (FRG)	1:34.98	+ 1.56
8	Christa Prinzing	West Germany (FRG)	1:35.04	+ 1.62
9	Heidi Zimmermann	Austria (AUT)	1:35.32	+ 1.90
10	Jean Saubert	United States (USA)	1:35.92	+ 2.50

- Erika Schinegger of Austria originally won the gold medal in 1:32.63 (−0.79 sec), but failed a gender test prior to the 1968 Winter Olympics.
- Over 22 years later, Schinegger handed the gold medal to Marielle Goitschel in 1988.

=== Giant slalom ===
Thursday, 11 August

Place	Athlete	Country	Time	Diff.
1st place, gold medalist(s)	Marielle Goitschel	France (FRA)	1:22.64	—
2nd place, silver medalist(s)	Heidi Zimmermann	Austria (AUT)	1:23.81	+ 1.17
3rd place, bronze medalist(s)	Florence Steurer	France (FRA)	1:24.92	+ 2.28
4	Nancy Greene	Canada (CAN)	1:25.38	+ 2.74
5	Annie Famose	France (FRA)	1:25.58	+ 2.94
6	Giustina Demetz	Italy (ITA)	1:26.08	+ 3.44
7	Theres Obrecht	Switzerland (SUI)	1:26.10	+ 3.46
8	Ruth Adolf	Switzerland (SUI)	1:26.37	+ 3.73
9	Burgl Färbinger	West Germany (FRG)	1:26.93	+ 4.29
10	Christa Prinzing	West Germany (FRG)	1:27.08	+ 4.44

=== Slalom ===
Friday, 5 August

Place	Athlete	Country	Time	Diff.
1st place, gold medalist(s)	Annie Famose	France (FRA)	1:30.48	—
2nd place, silver medalist(s)	Marielle Goitschel	France (FRA)	1:30.95	+ 0.47
3rd place, bronze medalist(s)	Penny McCoy	United States (USA)	1:32.35	+ 1.87
4	Jean Saubert	United States (USA)	1:32.37	+ 1.89
5	Cathy Allen	United States (USA)	1:32.77	+ 2.39
6	Christine Goitschel	France (FRA)	1:32.94	+ 2.56
7	Nancy Greene	Canada (CAN)	1:33.26	+ 2.88
8	Wendy Allen	United States (USA)	1:33.44	+ 3.06
9	Edith Hiltbrand	Switzerland (SUI)	1:34.69	+ 4.31
9	Dikke Eger	Norway (NOR)	1:34.69	+ 4.31

- First run leader Greene nearly fell in the second run and finished seventh.

=== Combined ===
Place	Athlete	Country	Points	DH	GS	SL
1st place, gold medalist(s)	Marielle Goitschel	France (FRA)	8.76	1st place, gold medalist(s)	1st place, gold medalist(s)	2nd place, silver medalist(s)
2nd place, silver medalist(s)	Annie Famose	France (FRA)	35.16	2nd place, silver medalist(s)	5	1st place, gold medalist(s)
3rd place, bronze medalist(s)	Heidi Zimmermann	Austria (AUT)	62.91	9	2nd place, silver medalist(s)	18
4	Burgl Färbinger	West Germany (FRG)	73.69	3rd place, bronze medalist(s)	9	14
5	Giustina Demetz	Italy (ITA)	83.68	6	6	21
6	Christa Prinzing	West Germany (FRG)	86.49	8	10	19
7	Ruth Adolf	Switzerland (SUI)	88.86	19	8	17
8	Wendy Allen	United States (USA)	95.76	23	11	8
9	Karen Dokka	Canada (CAN)	143.25	22	20	23
10	Divina Galica	Great Britain (GBR)	163.63	24	22	22

At the World Championships from 1954 through 1980, the combined was a "paper race" using the results of the three events (DH, GS, SL).

== Medals table ==
Place	Nation	Gold	Silver	Bronze	Total
1	France (FRA)	7	7	2	16
2	Italy (ITA)	1	–	–	1
3	Austria (AUT)	–	1	2	3
4	West Germany (FRG)	–	–	3	3
5	United States (USA)	–	–	1	1
