= Río Blanco (Aconcagua) =

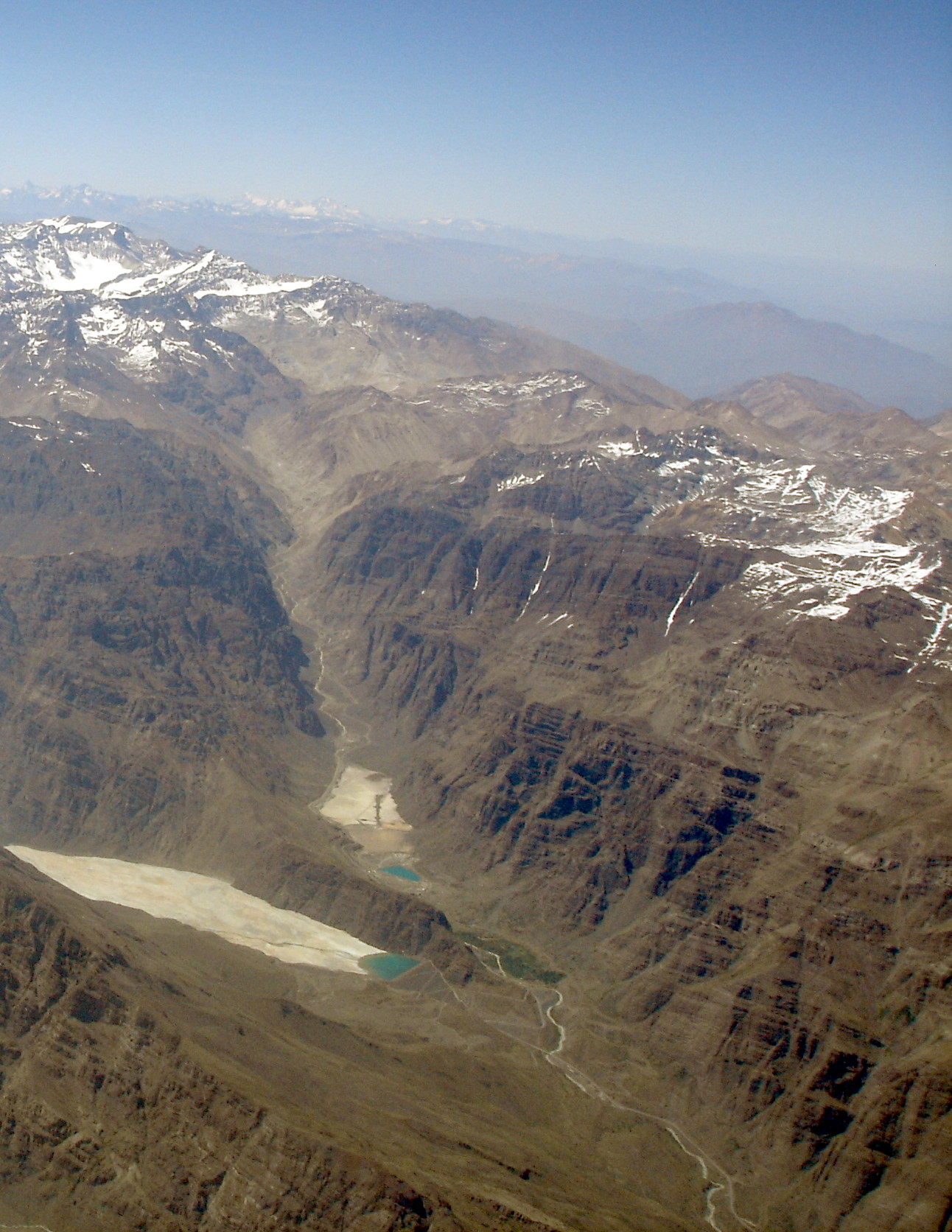
- Confluence of the Río Blanco and the Los Leones river. Cerro El Plomo is visible in the upper left portion of the image, while Los Leones Dam can be seen in the lower portion of the image.

Location
- Country: Chile

Physical characteristics
- Mouth
  - location: Aconcagua River
  - elevation: 1,430 m (4,690 ft)
- Length: 15 km (9.3 mi)

The Río Blanco (Spanish for "white river") is a river of Chile. It originates close to Cerro Altar and flows generally northward for 15 km (9.3 mi) until it joins the Juncal River, at an elevation of approximately 1,430 m (4,690 ft), forming the Aconcagua River. The mouth of the river is located close to Chile Route 60.

Los Leones River is the main tributary of the river. The inferior course of the Río Blanco is adjacent to Río Blanco National Reserve.

== See also ==
- List of rivers of Chile
