= Chile Route 60 =

Highway in Chile

Route 60
- Ruta 60

Location
- Country: Chile

Highway system
- Highways in Chile

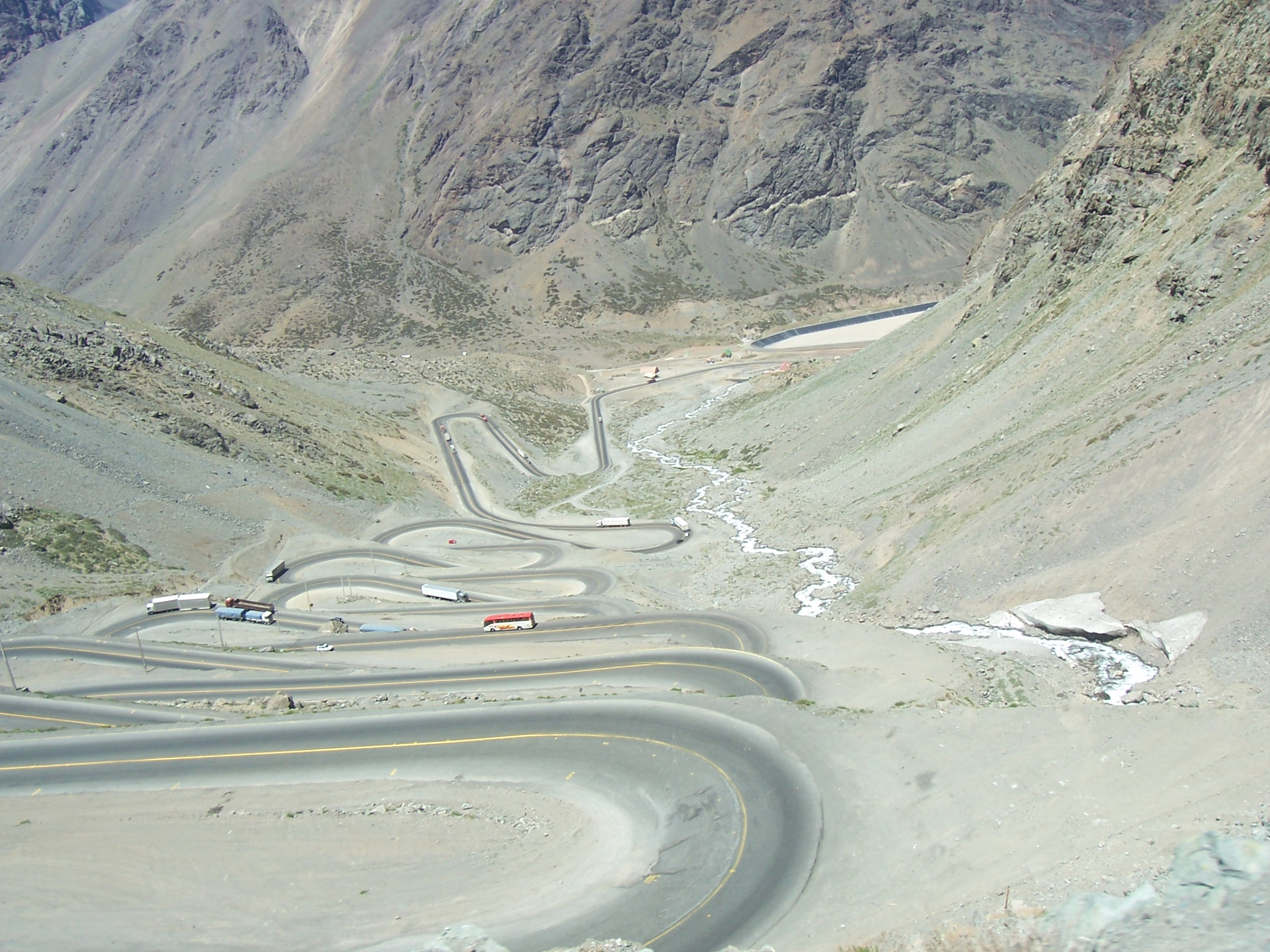
A stretch of hairpin turns. The locals in Chile often refer to this section of hairpin turns as "Los Caracoles" ("The Snails").

Chile Route 60 is a main road in the Valparaíso Region of Chile that extends from Valparaíso to Paso Los Libertadores. It continues into Argentina as National Route 7, toward Mendoza.

The Route 60 is made up of two separate stretches of road. One goes from the port of Valparaíso to the junction with Chile Route 5 at La Calera. The other stretch extends from Route 5 at Llaillay to the border with Argentina. The actual border crossing is in the 3 km long Cristo Redentor tunnel at 3.2 km altitude. The route roughly follows the course of the disused Transandine Railway and the Aconcagua River.

The route is famous for "Los Caracoles," a series of 29 hairpin turns with a combined elevation gain of 525 meters.

== History ==
Before the construction of the road, the route was a trail used by merchants and travelers. In 1910, the Transandine Railway became operational and quickly became the dominant form of transport between Chile and Argentina. Following a violent storm and flooding in 1934, the road, despite not being fully paved, became the only alternative for a decade. Even after the resumption of railway services in 1944, the road remained the preferred method of transportation. In 1980, the Cristo Redentor tunnel that forms the border crossing was completed, making the trip significantly easier and safer. The railway closed permanently in 1984, again making the road the only option along the route, although other border crossings had opened by then, such as the Paso Pehuenche.

In February 2026, the route received a significant upgrade with the completion of a new 25 km section of highway between San Felipe and Panquehue. The construction, which includes 2 new bridges and 18 overpasses, took 19 years and cost 166 million US dollars.

== Places along the route ==
- Valparaíso
- Viña del Mar
- Quillota
- La Calera
- Llaillay
- San Felipe
- Los Andes
- Portillo with Laguna del Inca
