= Laguna del Inca =

Lake in Chile

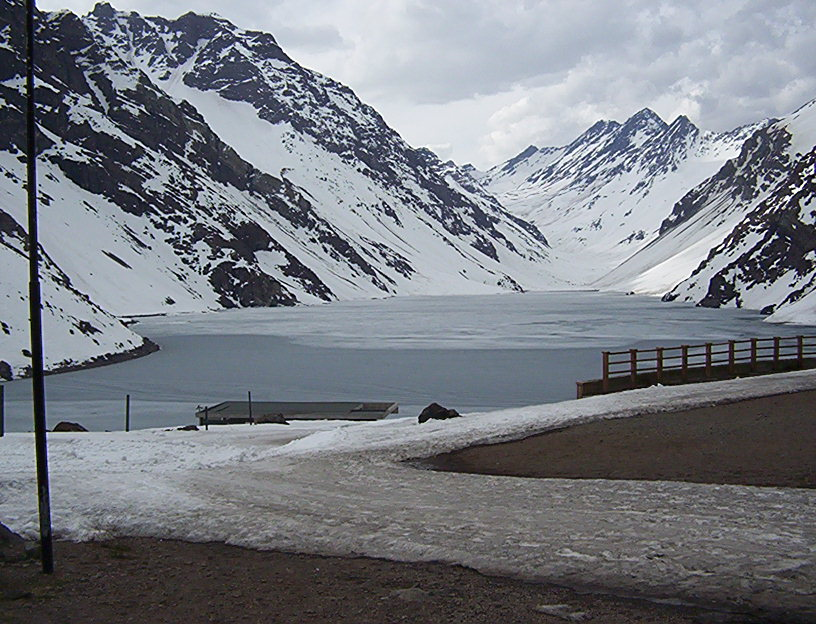

- Location within Chile
- Location: Chile
- Coordinates: 32°49′S 70°08′W
- Basin countries: Chile
- Max. length: 4 km (2.5 mi)
- Max. width: 700 m (2,300 ft)
- Surface elevation: 2,853 m (9,360 ft)

Laguna del Inca (Spanish pronunciation: [laˈɣuna ðel ˈiŋka]) is a lake in Valparaíso Region, Chile, close to the border with Argentina. Portillo ski resort is located at the southern end of the lake, near Chile Route 60.

The stream that drains the lake is a tributary of the Juncalillo River, which flows into the Juncal River.
