= Canada's athletes of the 20th century =

Canada's Athletes of the 20th century as voted on in a 1999 survey of newspaper editors and broadcasters conducted by the Canadian Press and Broadcast News:

== Top 10 Female Athletes ==
1. Nancy Greene (born 1943), skier
2. Silken Laumann (born 1964), rower
3. Barbara Ann Scott (1928–2012), figure skater
4. Myriam Bédard (born 1969), biathlon
5. Marnie McBean (born 1968), rower
6. Fanny "Bobbie" Rosenfeld (1904–1969), track-and-field (voted female athlete of the first half of the century)
7. Catriona Le May Doan (born 1970), speed skater
8. Sandra Post (born 1948), golfer
9. Marilyn Bell (born 1937), long-distance swimmer
10. Elaine Tanner (born 1951), swimmer

== Top 10 Male Athletes ==
1. Wayne Gretzky (born 1961), ice hockey player
2. Gordie Howe (1928–2016), ice hockey player
3. Bobby Orr (born 1948), ice hockey player
4. Lionel Conacher (1901–1954), multi-sport athlete (voted male athlete of the first half of the century)
5. Maurice Richard (1921–2000), ice hockey player
6. Donovan Bailey (born 1967), track-and-field
7. Ferguson Jenkins (born 1943), baseball player
8. Mario Lemieux (born 1965), ice hockey player
9. Larry Walker (born 1966), baseball player
10. Gaétan Boucher (born 1958), speed skater

== Team of the Century ==
- 1972 "Team Canada" composed of professional NHL players defeated a Soviet Union team in the Summit Series of ice hockey.

== See also ==
- Members of Canada's Sports Hall of Fame
- Members of Canada's Olympic Hall of Fame
- Recipients of the Lou Marsh Trophy
- Bobbie Rosenfeld Award (female)
- Velma Springstead Trophy (female)
- Lionel Conacher Award (male)
