= Chanco cheese =

Chilean cow's milk cheese

Chanco
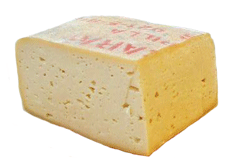
- Country of origin: Chile
- Town: Chanco
- Source of milk: Cows
- Texture: Semi-hard
- Named after: Chanco

Chanco is Chilean cow's milk cheese originally from the Chanco farm in Maule Region. Now it is produced all over south-central Chile, and represents almost 50% of Chilean cheese consumption. It is a semi-hard ripened cheese with reduced lactose content and soft consistency.

Chanco cheese originated during the colonial era and is along the Argentine Tafí del Valle and Goya cheeses the oldest cheeses created in the Southern Cone region of South America.

In colonial times the cheese was exported east through the Paso Pehuenche mountain pass in the Andes.

== See also ==
- List of cheeses
