= Los Leones Dam =

- Location within Chile
- Country: Chile
- Location: Santiago
- Coordinates: 32°58′22″S 70°15′18″W
- Status: Operational
- Construction began: 1980
- Opening date: 1999

Dam and spillways
- Type of dam: Embankment, tailings
- Impounds: Los Leones River
- Height: 160 m (525 ft) (axis)

The Los Leones Dam is a tailings dam on Los Leones River, a tributary of Blanco River, about 56 km (35 mi) northeast of Santiago, in Los Andes Province, Chile. The dam was constructed in segments between 1980 and 1999 and is now used only for emergencies. The dam is 135 m (443 ft) tall on its upstream face and 200 m (656 ft) tall on its downstream face; the height at its axis is 160 m (525 ft). It is one of the tallest tailings dams in the world.
