= Juncal River =

Location
- Country: Chile

Physical characteristics
- Mouth
  - location: Aconcagua River
- Length: 35 km (22 mi)

The Juncal River is a river of Chile. It has its source at the Juncal Norte Glacier, which originates at the summit of the Nevado Juncal. The upper Juncal River watershed is 220 square kilometers in area, of which 137.96 square kilometers is within Parque Andino Juncal, a private protected area and a Ramsar site. The river is joined by the Blanco River to form the Aconcagua River. The Juncalillo, one of its tributaries, receives the outflow of Laguna del Inca.

== See also ==
- List of rivers of Chile
