= Putaendo River =

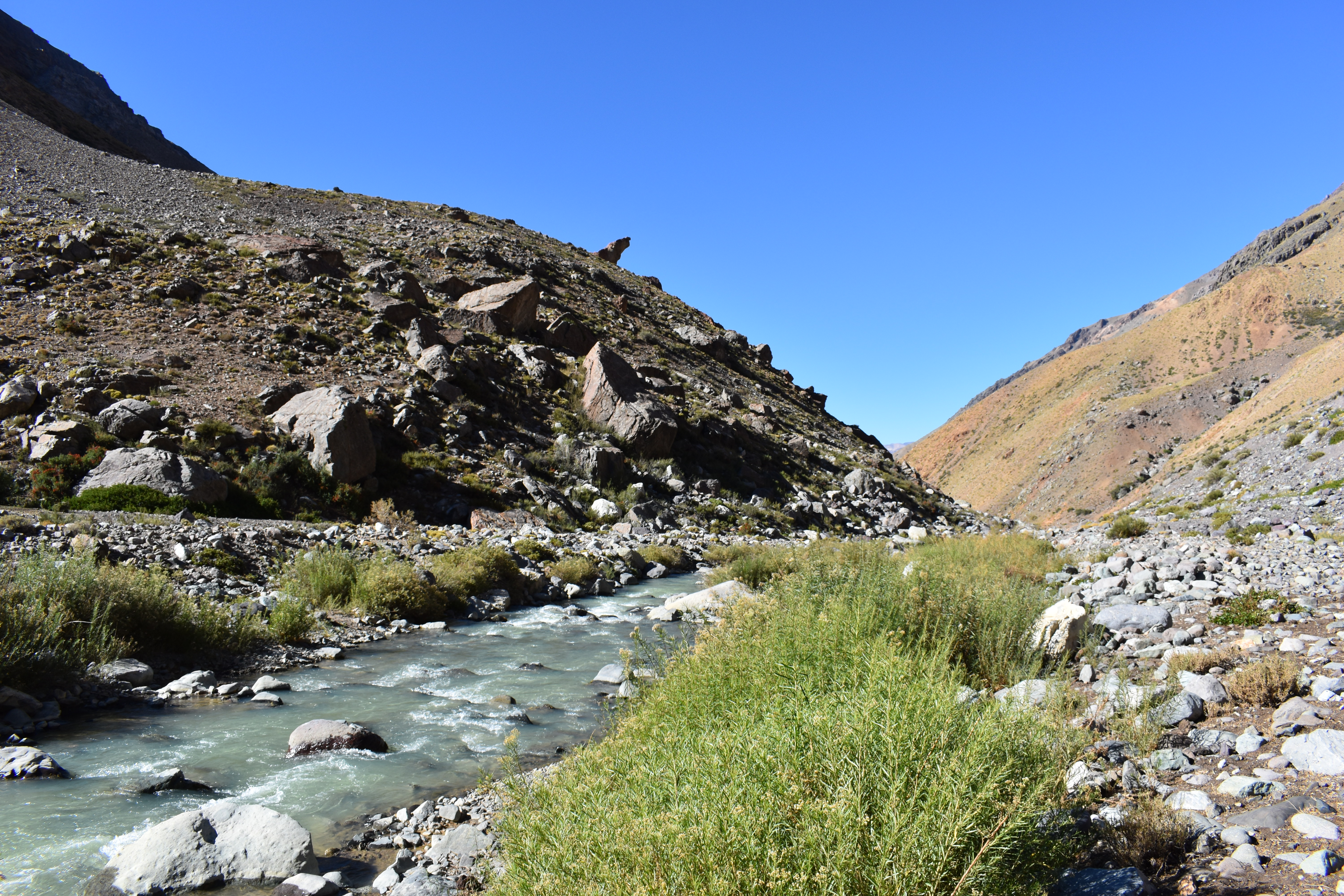

Location
- Country: Chile

The Putaendo River is located in central Chile, where it serves as an important tributary of the Aconcagua River. It flows through the Valparaíso Region, specifically within the San Felipe de Aconcagua Province.

The Putaendo River is part of the broader Aconcagua River, which features diverse climatic and geographical characteristics, transitioning from semiarid conditions to a Mediterranean climate. This makes the surrounding area suitable for various agricultural activities, which are a key source of regional income.

== See also ==
- List of rivers of Chile
