= Estero Los Litres =

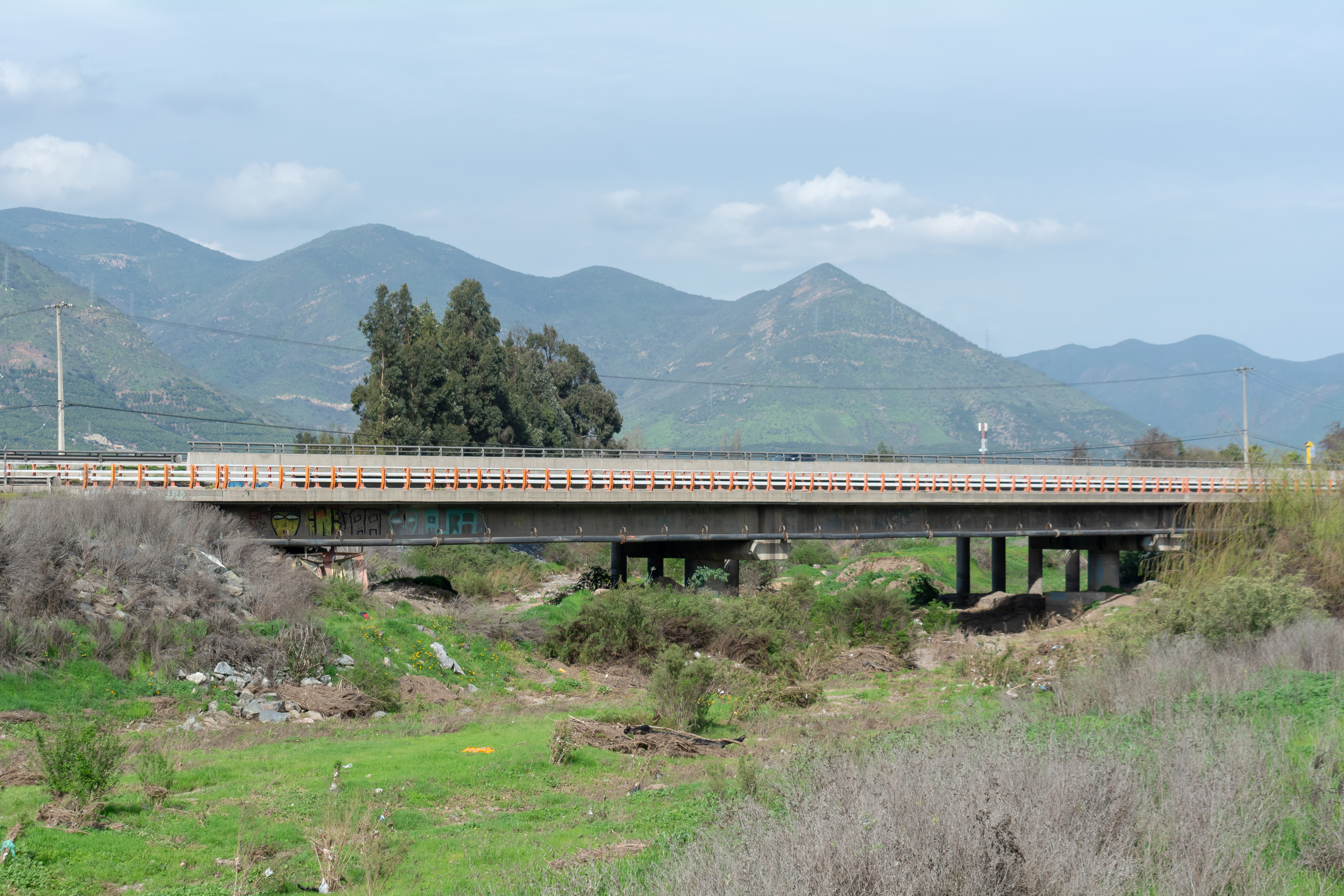

Location
- Country: Chile

The Estero Los Litres or Estero El Melón is an estuary of Chile that crosses the Valparaíso Region and disembogues in the Aconcagua River.

== Estuary Course and Flow ==
The Los Litres estuary originates north of the city of Nogales and flows southward through it. Along its course, it runs past the southern slope of La Calera, where the cities of El Melón and Artificio are also situated.

The lower Aconcagua sub-basin extends from its confluence with the Pocuro estuary to the mouth of the Aconcagua River at the Pacific Ocean, and includes the Catemu estuary. Peak flows occur in December and January due to snowmelt, while lower flows are observed from March to May. An assurance level probability of 85% is used to determine available water flows for allocating permanent agricultural irrigation rights, ensuring a high level of investment security.

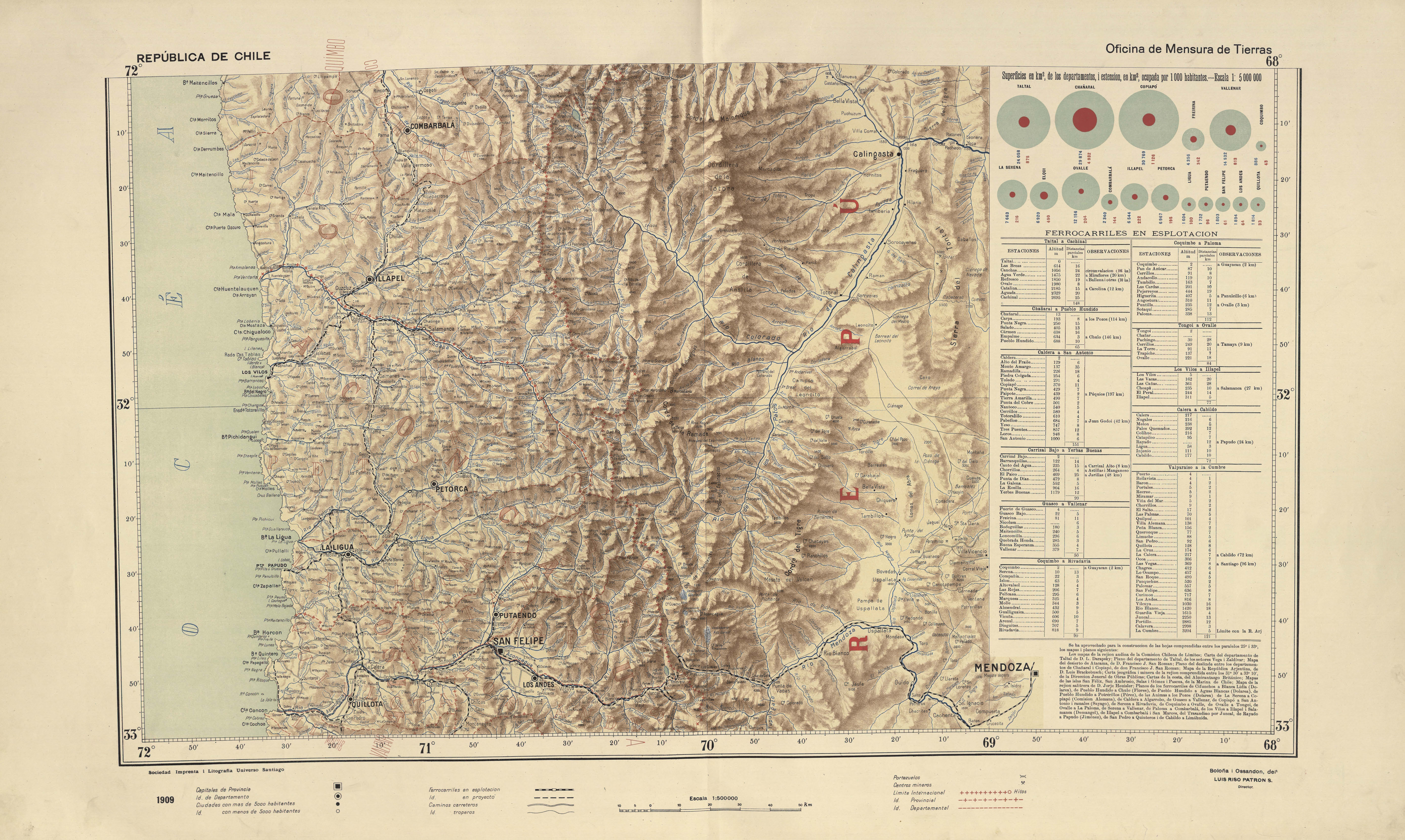
The Estero Los Litres depicted in the Atlas Centennial Provincial Maps.

== See also ==
- List of rivers of Chile
