= Paso Pehuenche =

Andean mountain pass and international border crossing

paso Pehuenche
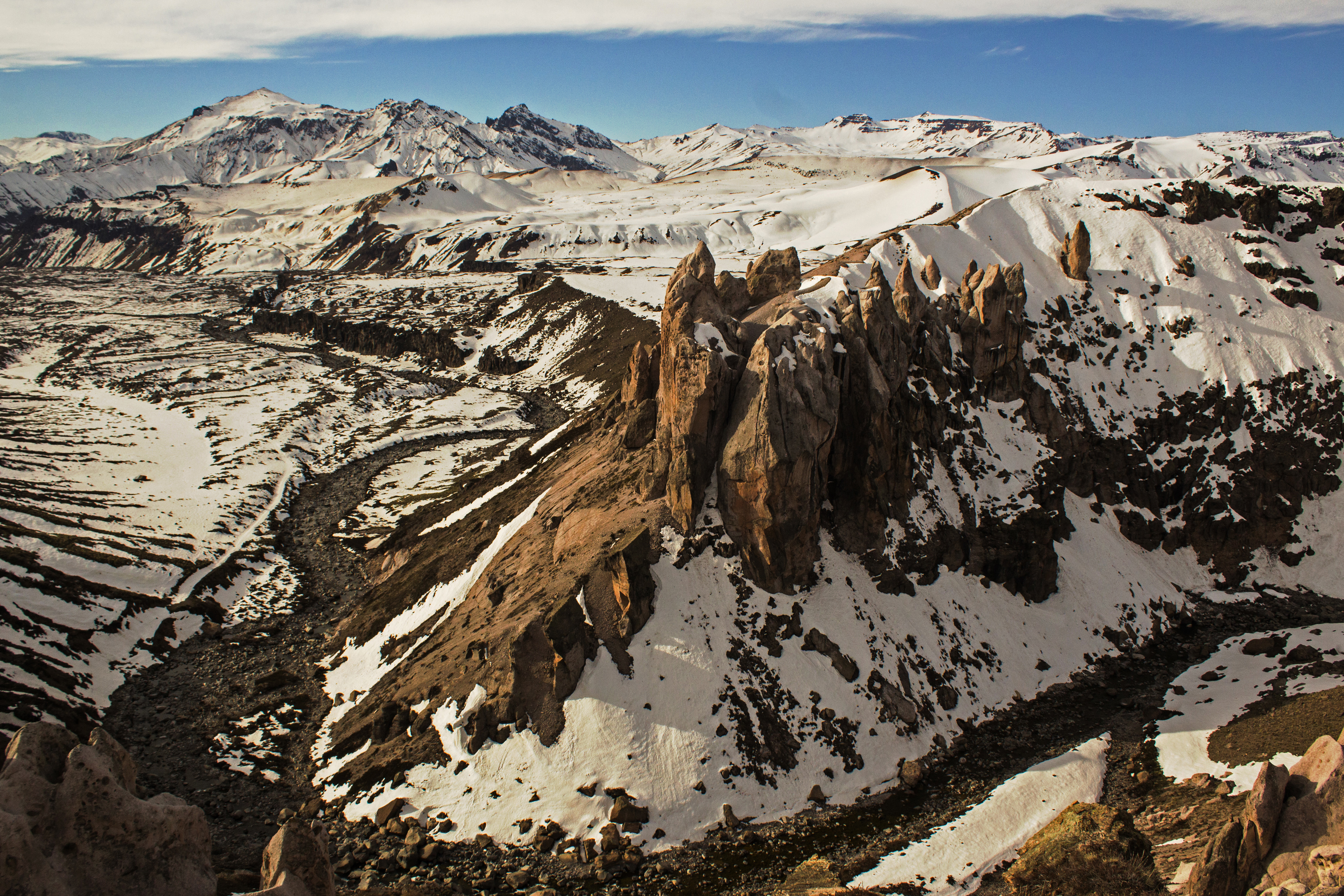
- Monjes Blancos, mountain landmark adjacent to the Pehuenches pass, in San Clemente, Chile.
- Interactive map of paso Pehuenche
- Elevation: 2,553 m (8,376 ft)

Location
- Location: Argentina–Chile border
- Range: Andes
- Coordinates: 35°59′S 70°24′W

Paso Pehuenche is an Andean mountain pass and international border crossing between Chile and Argentina. It connects Talca and San Clemente in Chile with Malargüe in Argentina.

== History ==
Through the 17th to the 19th century the mountain pass was an important trade route that allowed for the exchange of textiles, Chanco cheese, charqui and salt. Spanish colonial and early republican authorities attempted to end or limit this trade. A Spanish military expedition to the area in 1780 revealed that the Pehuenche people had an encampent in the mountain pass. The expedition turned violent and left a toll 116 Pehuenches dead. Peace treaties between the tribes of the mountain pass and Spanish authorities were established in 1783. Reportedly, Pehuenches engaged in trade across the pass to obtain Chilean grain since their lands were not suitable for agriculture.

== Sources ==
- PASO PEHUENCHE- COMPLEJO FRONTERIZO PEHUENCHE
