= Estero Pocuro =

Coordinates: 32°46′S 70°44′W

Location
- Country: Chile

The Estero Pocuro is a river of Chile.

== See also ==
- List of rivers of Chile
