= Estero Catemu =

Coordinates: 32°48′S 71°00′W

Location
- Country: Chile

The Estero Catemu is a river of Chile.

== See also ==
- List of rivers of Chile
