= Portillo, Chile =

Ski resort in Chile

Ski Portillo Chile
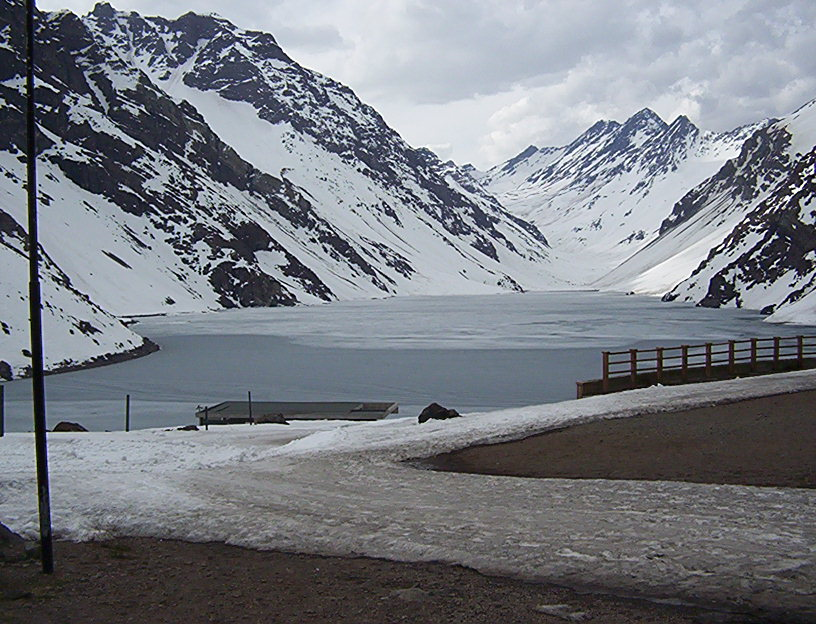
- Laguna del Inca at 2,853 m (9,360 ft)

- Location in Chile
- Location: Andes mountains, Valparaíso Region, Chile
- Nearest city: Los Andes
- Coordinates: 32.836°S 70.129°W
- Vertical: 762 m (2,500 ft)
- Top elevation: 3,310 m (10,860 ft) (lift); 4,222 m (13,852 ft) (summit)
- Base elevation: 2,548 m (8,360 ft) (lift); 2,880 m (9,450 ft) (hotel)
- Skiable area: 5.0 km^{2} (1,240 acres)
- Trails: 35
- Longest run: 2.5 km (1.6 mi)
- Lift system: 5 chairlifts, 9 surface lifts
- Snowfall: 8.3 m (27 ft 3 in)
- Snowmaking: yes
- Night skiing: none
- Website: skiportillo.com

Portillo is a ski resort in the Andes mountains of Chile. Located in the Valparaíso Region, it is 61 km (38 mi) from Los Andes, the nearest city, and 160 km (100 mi) by vehicle from Santiago. Its hotel sits at an elevation of 2,880 m (9,450 ft) above sea level.

Ski Portillo has 35 named runs and 14 lifts. The lowest lift loads at 2,548 m (8,360 ft), and the highest reaches 3,310 m (10,860 ft), yielding a vertical drop of 762 m (2,500 ft).

The summit of the mountain (Ojos de Agua) reaches 4,222 m (13,852 ft). Nearby peaks include Los Tres Hermanos at 4,751 m (15,587 ft) and La Paraya at 4,831 m (15,850 ft). Aconcagua, the highest mountain in both the Western and Southern Hemispheres, is nearby across the Argentinian border; at 6,961 m (22,838 ft), it exceeds any peak outside the Himalayas, Karakoram, Pamir and Tien Shan of Asia.

== History ==
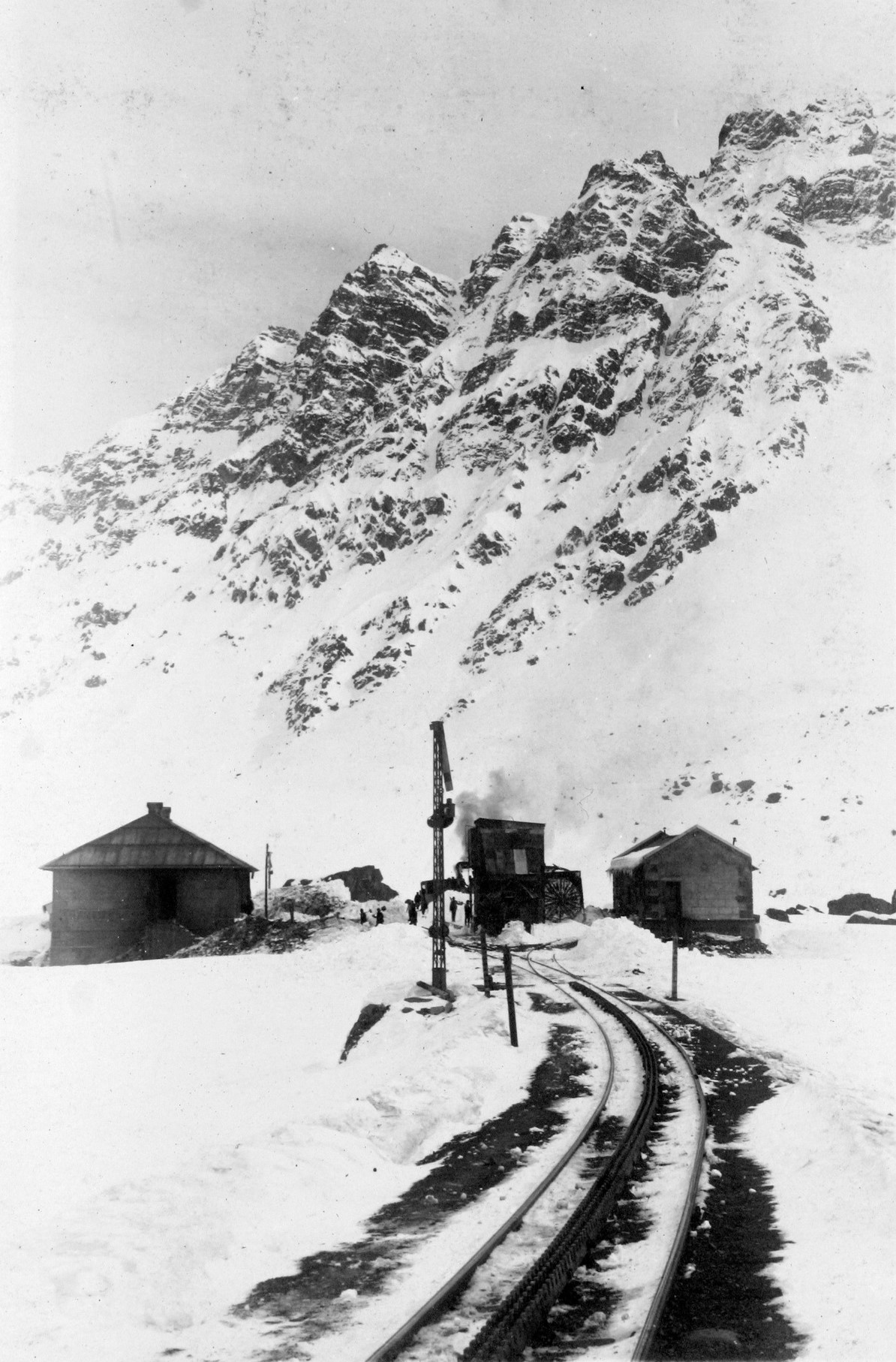
Old Portillo railway station in 1919

Portillo was originally founded as a train station in 1908, during the construction of the Transandine Railway. A few years after the inauguration of the Transandine Railway in 1910, the station began to be used as a ski resort. Plans to build the ski area were drawn up in the 1930s. Construction began in 1942 and the ski area was opened in 1949. Several of the ski lifts on the west side of the valley were destroyed by avalanches in 1965 and were rebuilt in time for Portillo to host the Alpine World Ski Championships in August 1966. Those championships marked the emergence of Jean-Claude Killy, who won gold medals in the downhill and combined events. Portillo has since become one of the principal destinations for ski racers to train during the Northern Hemisphere summer and hosts the national ski teams of Austria, Italy, and the United States.

It is owned and operated by the Purcell family, who have a chain of hotels in Chile, most noticeably the Tierra Hotels including Tierra Atacama in San Pedro de Atacama.

== Location ==
Portillo lies at Chile Route 60, close to the border between Chile and Argentina at Paso Los Libertadores.

== Season ==
The ski season at Portillo typically runs from mid-June to early-October, conditions permitting.

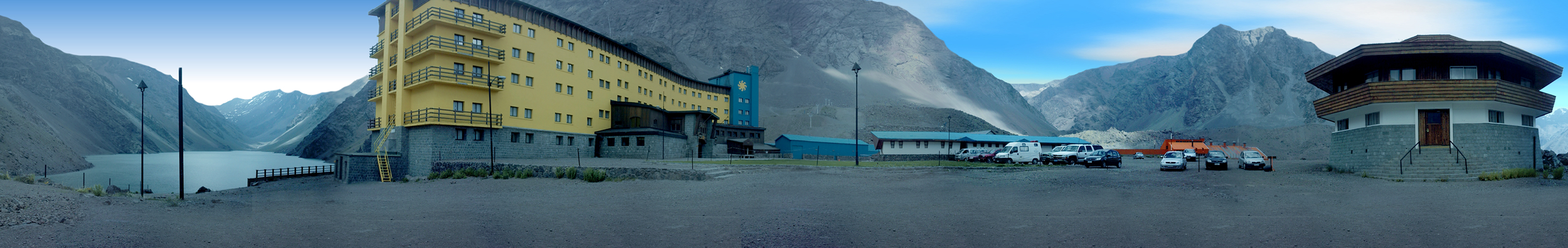
Panoramic view of the Portillo ski resort in summer.
