= Penny McCoy =

American alpine skier (born 1949)

Personal information
- Born: October 9, 1949 (age 76)

Skiing career
- Sport: Alpine skiing
- Club: Mammoth Mountain (CA)
- Retired: 1969 (age 19)
- Disciplines: Giant slalom, slalom
- World Cup debut: January 1967 (age 17) (inaugural season)

Olympics
- Teams: 0 – (alternate in 1968)

World Championships
- Teams: 1 – (1966)
- Medals: 1 (0 gold)

World Cup
- Seasons: 3 – (1967–69)
- Podiums: 0
- Overall titles: 0 - (13th in 1967)
- Discipline titles: 0 - (9th in SL, 1967)
Medal record
Women's alpine skiing
Representing the United States
World Championships
Bronze medal – third place	1966 Portillo	Slalom

Penny McCoy (born October 9, 1949) is a former World Cup alpine ski racer from the United States.

At age 16, McCoy won the bronze medal in the women's slalom at the 1966 World Championships in Portillo, Chile. She had six top ten finishes in World Cup competition.

Shortly before the 1968 Winter Olympics, McCoy and Sandy Shellworth were left off the U.S. team by head coach Bob Beattie, displaced by new arrivals Kiki Cutter and Judy Nagel. Shellworth did get to compete, as an injury replacement in the downhill, but McCoy did not.

== World Cup results ==
- 6 top ten finishes - (4 SL, 2 GS)

Season	Date	Location	Discipline	Place
1967	10 Jan 1967	Grindelwald, Switzerland	Slalom	5th
1967	26 Feb 1967	St. Gervais, France	Slalom	6th
1967	28 Feb 1967	St. Gervais, France	Giant slalom	8th
1967	12 Mar 1967	(United States) Franconia, USA	Slalom	5th
1968	25 Jan 1968	St. Gervais, France	Slalom	9th
1968	24 Feb 1968	Oslo, Norway	Giant slalom	10th

== Personal ==
McCoy is the daughter of Dave McCoy (b. 1915), the founder of Mammoth Mountain Ski Area in California in 1953. She and her five siblings were raised in nearby Bishop. McCoy is the sister of Dennis McCoy (b. 1945), who was also a World Cup racer. He finished 21st in the downhill at the 1968 Olympics. She was formerly married to stuntman Stan Barrett (b. 1943). Stuntmen David Barrett and Stanton Barrett (b. 1972) are their sons.
