= Estero Quilpué =

River in Valparaíso Region, Chile

Location
- Country: Chile

The Estero Quilpué is a river of Chile tributary of Estero Marga Marga in the Valparaíso Region, Chile.

== See also ==
- List of rivers of Chile
