= Estero Los Loros =

Coordinates: 32°50′S 71°01′W

Location
- Country: Chile

The Estero Los Loros is a river of Chile.

== See also ==
- List of rivers of Chile
