= Colorado River (Aconcagua) =

Coordinates: 33°32′31″S 70°17′00″W

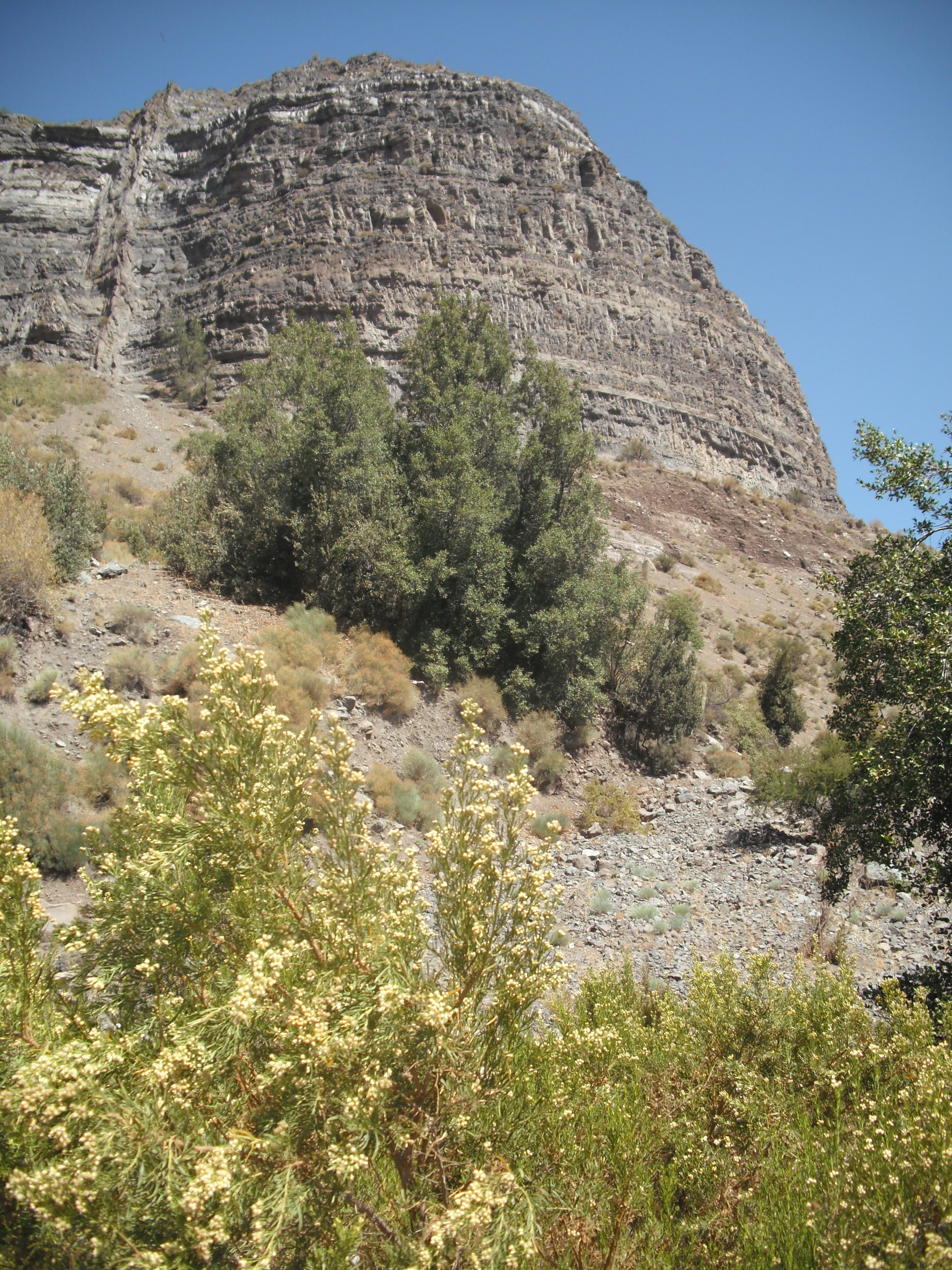
- Ravine of Colorado River

Location
- Country: Chile

The Colorado River (Spanish: Río Colorado, Spanish pronunciation: [ˈri.o koloˈɾaðo]) is a river of Chile.

== See also ==
- List of rivers of Chile
