= Estero Limache =

Coordinates: 32°57′S 71°28′W

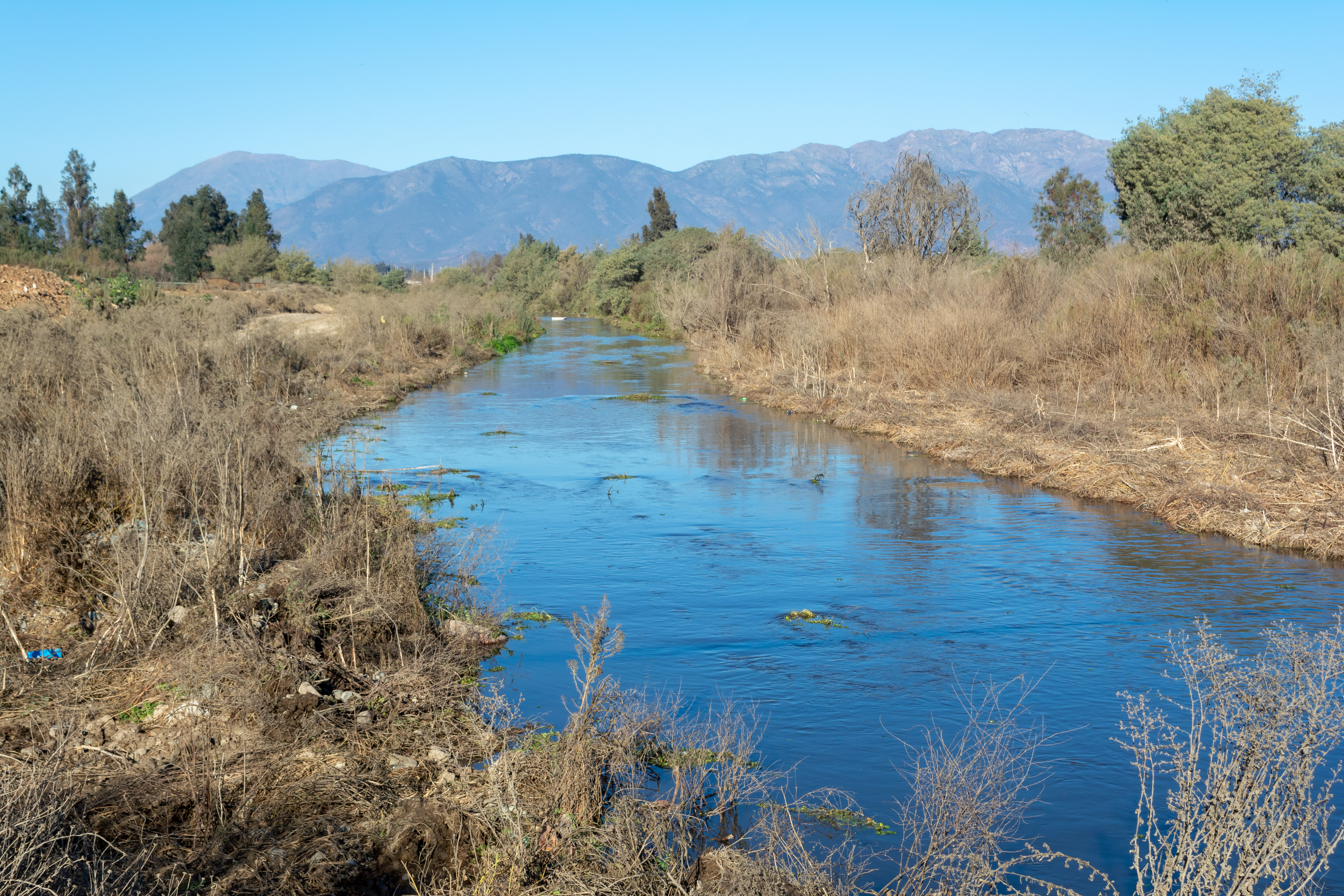

Location
- Country: Chile

The Estero Limache is a river of Chile. The invasive plant species Limnobium laevigatum is present in the river.

== See also ==
- List of rivers of Chile
