= Erik Schinegger =

Austrian intersex skier (born 1948)

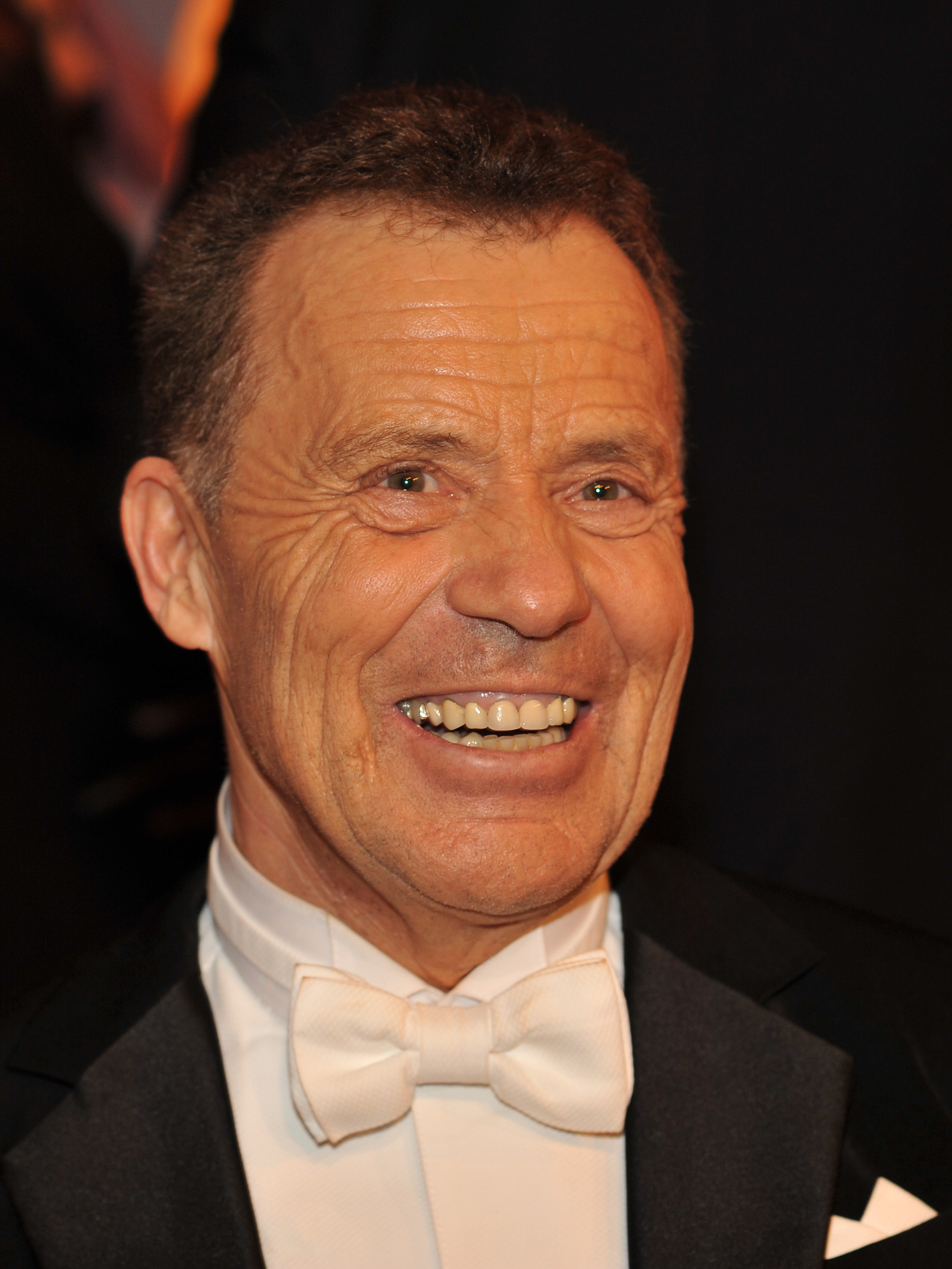
Erik Schinegger 2014

Erik Schinegger (born 19 June 1948) is an Austrian intersex skier. He was the women's downhill ski world champion in 1966, at which time he was recognized as female and known as Erika Schinegger.

== Biography ==
Schinegger was born in Agsdorf, Carinthia, and raised as a girl.

Schinegger first attracted attention when he finished third in the downhill in Grindelwald on 14 January 1966 with start no. 24 and thus contributed to an ÖSV quadruple success (Christl Haas, Edith Zimmermann; fourth Traudl Hecher). He also won the downhill in St-Gervais on 29 January with a lead of 1.53 sec. over Nancy Greene and on 25 March 1966 the downhill in Sun Valley in the "Five Nations Competition" (again ahead of Greene).

Schinegger's greatest success was winning the women's downhill world championship title at the FIS Alpine World Ski Championships 1966 in Portillo, Chile, a month after his eighteenth birthday. At the Gold Key Race in Schruns, Schinegger finished second on 18 January 1967, followed by his only victory in an World Cup Race, a giant slalom, on 28 January 1967 in Saint-Gervais. In February 1967, Schinegger won the Austrian Championships in the giant slalom.

Before the 1968 Winter Olympics in Grenoble, a medical examination revealed that Schinegger had XY chromosomes. Schinegger, who had been assigned female at birth based on genital appearance, decided to undergo a gender reassignment surgery and change his first name from Erika to Erik.

Schinegger was not retroactively stripped of the World Champion title of 1966, but the then runner-up Marielle Goitschel was retroactively awarded the gold medal as well. In 1988 Schinegger himself presented his World Championship gold medal to Marielle Goitschel, however, she gave him back the medal. Schinegger married and became father of a daughter in 1978. He lives as owner of a children's ski school and two inns in his hometown Agsdorf in Carinthia and has two grandsons.

In 1988 Erik Schinegger wrote together with Marco Schenz the book Mein Sieg über mich. The man who became world champion, in which he came to terms with his life. This book was very successful, especially in the French translation. Schinegger's story was depicted in 2005 by Kurt Mayer in the documentary film ERIK(A) - Der Mann der Weltmeisterin wurde. At the 53rd Trento Film Festival the film was awarded the "Silver Gentian" in the same year.

In 2014, he took part in the ORF show Dancing Stars, but dropped out prematurely due to injury. In 2015, he served as councilor in his home municipality of Sankt Urban.

On 17 March 2017, a major fire occurred on Schinegger's estate in Agsdorf, completely burning down the entire farm building.

In the 2018 feature film Erik & Erika by Reinhold Bilgeri, his life was again portrayed, with Markus Freistätter in the leading role. Titled One like Erika, the film was shown on Ersten on 25 November 2020.

== Awards ==
- In the election held on 19 December 1966 for Austrian Sports Personality of the Year, Schinegger came second(r) behind Emmerich Danzer with 837 points (18 first places) and was thus practically Sportswoman of the Year; Heidi Zimmermann came third.
- Before adjusting to manhood, Erik(a) Schinegger of the Sports Press Club of Carinthia was twice (1966, 1967) best female athlete in the election "Carinthian Sportsman of the Year".

== Works ==
- Erik/Erika Schinegger: My victory over me. The man who became world champion. recorded by Marco Schenz, F.A. Herbig, Munich 1988, ISBN 0-283-92112-9.
- Erik Schinegger: With a Porsche to new self-confidence. In: Landesschiverband / Kleine Zeitung (ed.): Vom Großglockner zum Klammer-Stich. 100 Years of Skiing in Carinthia. Carinthia Verlag, 2007, ISBN 978-3-85378-622-2, pp. 29–34.
- Erik Schinegger: The man who became world champion: My two lives, recorded by Claudio Honsal. Amalthea Signum Verlag, Vienna 2018, ISBN 978-3-99050-114-6.

== Literature ==
- Matthias Marschik / Georg Spitaler (eds.): Heroes and Idols: Sports Stars in Austria, StudienVerlag, 2006, pp. 355–359, ISBN 3-7065-4253-6.
- Erik Schinegger: An Intersex Epic in Alpine Skiing, in: Patricia Nell Warren: The Lavender Locker Room: 3000 Years of Great Athletes Whose Sexual Orientation Was Different, Beverly Hills, Wildcat Press 2006, p. 227, ISBN 1-889135-07-0

== Films ==
- ERIK(A) - Der Mann der Weltmeisterin wurde (Documentary, 2005), Producer: Kurt Mayer
- Erik & Erika (feature film, Germany/Austria 2018), director: Reinhold Bilgeri; first broadcast on TV on 6 January 2020 on ORF and under the title Einer wie Erika on 25 November 2020 on Ersten

== See also ==
- Sex verification in sports
- Imane Khelif
