= Madeleine Wuilloud =

Swiss alpine skier (born 1946)

Madeleine Wuilloud (born 5 April 1946) is a Swiss former alpine skier who competed in the 1968 Winter Olympics
