= Margret Hafen =

German alpine skier (born 1946)

Margret Hafen (born 26 September 1946 in Oberstdorf) is a German former alpine skier who competed in the 1968 Winter Olympics.
