= Edith Zimmermann =

Austrian alpine skier (born 1941)

Medal record

Women's alpine skiing

Representing Austria

Olympic Games
Silver medal – second place	1964 Innsbruck	Downhill

World Championships
Bronze medal – third place	1964 Innsbruck	Combined

Edith Zimmermann (born 1 November 1941) is an Austrian former alpine skier who competed in the 1964 Winter Olympics.

She was born in Lech am Arlberg.

In 1964 she won the silver medal in the downhill event. In the slalom competition she finished fifth and in the giant slalom contest she finished sixth. She is the sister of Heidi Zimmermann (born 1 May 1946), double medalist at the FIS Alpine Skiing World Championships 1966.
