= Giustina Demetz =

Italian alpine skier (born 1941)

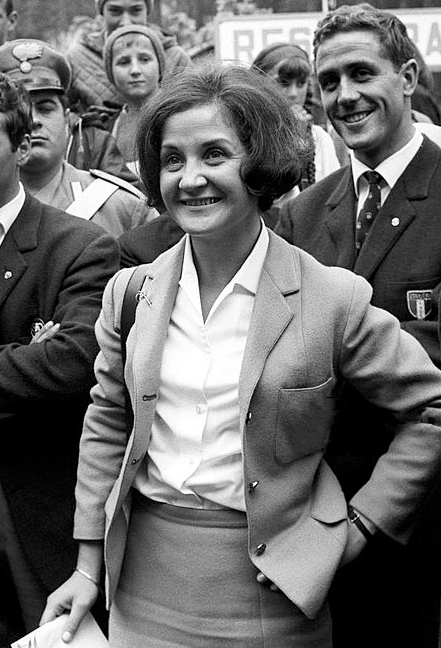
- Giustina Demetz in 1966

Personal information
- Born: 27 April 1941 (age 85) Santa Cristina Gherdëina, Italy
- Height: 1.63 m (5 ft 4 in)
- Weight: 55 kg (121 lb)

Sport
- Sport: Alpine skiing

Giustina Demetz (born 27 April 1941) is an Italian former alpine skier who competed at the 1964 and 1968 Winter Olympics in the downhill, slalom and giant slalom events. She failed her slalom races, and finished in 11–14th place in the other two events. Demetz won one downhill stage of the 1967 World Cup (together with Marielle Goitschel) and finished third overall.
