= Ruth Adolf =

Swiss alpine skier (born 1943)

Personal information
- Nationality: Swiss
- Born: 3 July 1943 (age 83) Bern, Switzerland

Sport
- Sport: Alpine skiing

Ruth Adolf (born 3 July 1943) is a Swiss alpine skier. She competed in two events at the 1964 Winter Olympics.
