= Suzy Chaffee =

American alpine skier

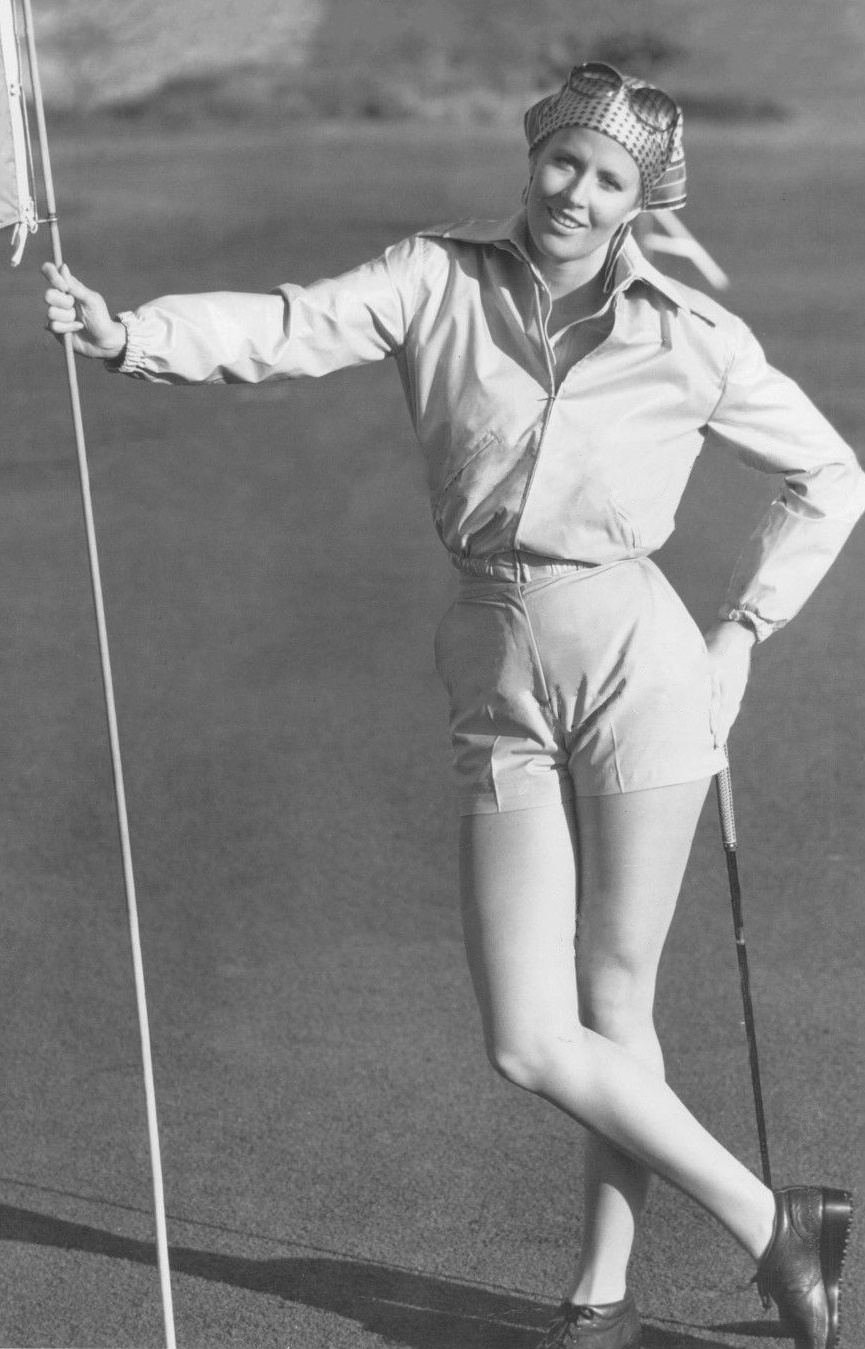
- Chaffee in 1976

Personal information
- Nickname: Suzy Chapstick
- Nationality: American
- Born: Suzanne Stevia Chaffee; November 29, 1946 (age 79) Rutland, Vermont, U.S.
- Height: 173 cm (5 ft 8 in)
- Weight: 63 kg (139 lb)

Sport
- Country: United States
- Sport: Alpine skiing
- Club: Mammoth Mountain Ski Club
- Retired: 1968

Suzanne Stevia Chaffee (born November 29, 1946) is an American former Olympic alpine ski racer and actress. Following her racing career, she modeled in New York with Ford Models and then became the pre-eminent freestyle ballet skier of the early 1970s. She was the first woman to serve on the board of the U.S. Olympic Committee. She is perhaps best known by the nickname "Suzy Chapstick", since the 1970s, when she was a spokesperson for ChapStick lip balm.

== Biography ==
Chaffee's mother, who taught her to ski at the age of 3, would have been an alternate for the US ski team at the 1940 Winter Olympics. Her elder brother Rick Chaffee is also an Olympic alpine skier. At age 19, Chaffee tried out for, and won a spot on, the first US Ski Team while a freshman at the University of Denver. She finished fourth in the downhill at the 1966 World Championships. Despite a season-ending crash in 1967 at Vail in the World Cup Series, she ended the season as the 10th ranked in Women's downhill skier, and the 16th ranked Women's All-Around skier. Chaffee was named captain of the US Women's team and was one of the favorites in the downhill at the 1968 Winter Olympics in Grenoble, France. She finished 28th in the downhill, blaming her poor showing on using the wrong wax, but she made a global impression with her skin-tight silver racing suit. She retired from ski racing after the 1968 Olympics. She was also a three-time world freestyle skiing champion (1971–73). She was inducted into the National Ski Hall of Fame in 1988.

As a social activist, Chaffee championed Title IX legislation (equal opportunity for women in school sports). She was the first woman to serve on the board of the U.S. Olympic Committee, and has been a member of the President's Council on Physical Fitness under four U.S. presidents. She was a co-founder in 1996 of the Native Voices Foundation, an organization that seeks to develop Olympians from among Native American tribes.

She credited rumors that she was having an affair with Ted Kennedy as helping passage of the Amateur Sports Act of 1978. "The gossip got the bill through," she told Sports Illustrated.

In 1979, the Supersisters trading card set was produced and distributed; one of the cards featured Chaffee's name and picture.

Besides her long-running television ad campaign for ChapStick in the 1970s, she also endorsed Revlon cosmetics, Dannon yogurt, and Seagram spirits. She appeared in films such as Ski Lift to Death and Fire and Ice.

In 1982, Chaffee appeared as a contestant on Bullseye.

In 2008, she ran for a seat on the Sedona, Arizona, City Council, but lost.
