= Alpine skiing at the 1968 Winter Olympics – Men's slalom =

Men's slalom at the X Olympic Winter Games
- Alpine skiing
- Venue: Chamrousse
- Date: February 16–17, 1968
- Competitors: 100 from 33 nations
- Winning time: 3:09.62

Medalists
1st place, gold medalist(s)		Jean-Claude Killy	France
2nd place, silver medalist(s)		Herbert Huber	Austria
3rd place, bronze medalist(s)		Alfred Matt	Austria

The Men's slalom competition of the Grenoble 1968 Olympics was held at Chamrousse.

The defending world champion was Carlo Senoner of Italy, while France's Jean-Claude Killy was the defending World Cup slalom champion and Switzerland's Dumeng Giovanoli was the leader of the 1968 World Cup.

== Final ==
Rank	Name	Country	Run 1	Run 2	Total	Difference
1st place, gold medalist(s)	Jean-Claude Killy	France	0:49.37	0:50.36	1:39.73	-
2nd place, silver medalist(s)	Herbert Huber	Austria	0:50.06	0:49.76	1:39.82	+0.09
3rd place, bronze medalist(s)	Alfred Matt	Austria	0:49.68	0:50.41	1:40.09	+0.36
4	Dumeng Giovanoli	Switzerland	0:49.89	0:50.33	1:40.22	+0.49
5	Spider Sabich	United States	0:49.75	0:50.74	1:40.49	+0.76
6	Andrzej Bachleda-Curuś	Poland	0:49.88	0:50.73	1:40.61	+0.88
7	Jimmy Heuga	United States	0:49.96	0:51.01	1:40.97	+1.24
8	Alain Penz	France	0:49.89	0:51.25	1:41.14	+1.41
9	Rick Chaffee	United States	0:49.95	0:51.24	1:41.19	+1.46
10	Peter Frei	Switzerland	0:50.04	0:51.94	1:41.98	+2.25
11	Rune Lindström	Sweden	0:51.19	0:50.80	1:41.99	+2.26
12	Luggi Leitner	West Germany	0:50.89	0:52.61	1:43.50	+3.77
13	Eberhard Riedel	East Germany	0:52.00	0:52.07	1:44.07	+4.34
14	Lasse Hamre	Norway	0:51.84	0:52.31	1:44.15	+4.42
14	Heini Messner	Austria	0:52.32	0:51.83	1:44.15	+4.42
16	Alfred Hagn	West Germany	0:52.95	0:51.70	1:44.65	+4.92
17	Jon Terje Øverland	Norway	0:51.51	0:53.37	1:44.88	+5.15
18	Ulf Ekstam	Finland	0:52.66	0:52.26	1:44.92	+5.19
19	Ivo Mahlknecht	Italy	0:52.22	0:53.03	1:45.25	+5.52
20	Max Rieger	West Germany	0:53.81	0:51.57	1:45.38	+5.65
21	Ryszard Ćwikła	Poland	0:53.69	0:53.11	1:46.80	+7.07
22	Bjarne Strand	Norway	0:51.69	0:55.69	1:47.38	+7.65
23	Francisco Fernández Ochoa	Spain	0:53.52	0:54.61	1:48.13	+8.40
24	Malcolm Milne	Australia	0:56.36	0:56.06	1:52.42	+12.69
25	Dan Cristea	Romania	0:56.10	0:57.23	1:53.33	+13.60
26	Vasily Melnikov	Soviet Union	0:54.94	0:59.48	1:54.42	+14.69
27	Carlos Adsera	Spain	0:59.54	0:57.67	1:57.21	+17.48
28	Blaž Jakopič	Yugoslavia	0:54.26	1:03.22	1:57.48	+17.75
29	Petar Angelov	Bulgaria	1:00.72	0:58.07	1:58.79	+19.06
30	Jeremy Palmer-Tomkinson	Great Britain	0:54.19	1:06.93	2:01.12	+21.39
31	Andrey Belokrinkin	Soviet Union	1:08.96	0:58.90	2:07.86	+28.13
-	Karl Schranz	Austria	0:49.69	DQ	-	-
-	Bengt-Erik Grahn	Sweden	0:49.74	DQ	-	-
-	Guy Périllat	France	0:49.89	DQ	-	-
-	Håkon Mjøen	Norway	0:49.91	DQ	-	-
-	Willi Lesch	West Germany	0:51.28	DQ	-	-
-	Jean-Pierre Augert	France	0:51.32	DQ	-	-
-	Jaroslav Janda	Czechoslovakia	0:51.62	DQ	-	-
-	Carlo Senoner	Italy	0:51.63	DNF	-	-
-	Olle Rolén	Sweden	0:51.77	DQ	-	-
-	Andreas Sprecher	Switzerland	0:51.91	DQ	-	-
-	Per-Olov Richardsson	Sweden	0:52.46	DQ	-	-
-	Wolfgang Ender	Liechtenstein	0:53.67	DQ	-	-
-	Robert Swan	Canada	0:53.75	DQ	-	-
-	Richard Leatherbee	Chile	0:56.26	DQ	-	-
-	Milan Pažout	Czechoslovakia	1:02.29	DQ	-	-
-	Aurelio García	Spain	DNF	-	-	-
-	Billy Kidd	United States	DNF	-	-	-
-	Willy Favre	Switzerland	DQ	-	-	-
-	Athanasios Tsimikalis	Greece	DNF	-	-	-
-	Rod Hebron	Canada	DNF	-	-	-

== Classification ==
=== Round One ===
The top two in each heat advanced directly to the final, with the other racers moving to the second round.

Heat A

Rank	Name	Country	Time	Difference
1	Jean-Claude Killy	France	49.89	-
2	Robert Swan	Canada	53.50	+3.61
3	Ulf Ekstam	Finland	54.79	+4.90
4	Ian Todd	Great Britain	57.53	+7.64
5	Nagib Barrak	Lebanon	67.13	+17.24
6	Kristinn Benediktsson	Iceland	67.66	+17.77

Heat B

Rank	Name	Country	Time	Difference
1	Dumeng Giovanoli	Switzerland	51.14	-
2	Per-Olov Richardsson	Sweden	54.83	+3.69
3	Luggi Leitner	West Germany	55.34	+4.20
4	Secundino Rodríguez	Spain	57.30	+6.16
5	Mehmet Yıldırım	Turkey	65.31	+14.17
-	Robert Palmer	New Zealand	DQ	-

Heat C

Rank	Name	Country	Time	Difference
1	Alfred Matt	Austria	50.99	-
2	Lasse Hamre	Norway	53.33	+2.34
3	Francisco Fernández Ochoa	Spain	53.43	+2.44
4	Luke O'Reilly	Great Britain	54.35	+3.36
5	Lotfollah Kia Shemshaki	Iran	57.18	+6.19
-	Murray Gardner	New Zealand	DQ	-

Heat D

Rank	Name	Country	Time	Difference
1	Håkon Mjøen	Norway	52.36	-
2	Jaroslav Janda	Czechoslovakia	53.20	+0.84
3	Max Rieger	West Germany	54.20	+1.84
4	Fayzollah Band Ali	Iran	58.90	+6.54
5	Mario Vera	Chile	66.02	+13.66
6	Mehdi Mouidi	Morocco	73.61	+21.25

Heat E

Rank	Name	Country	Time	Difference
1	Heini Messner	Austria	51.76	-
2	Jon Terje Øverland	Norway	51.93	+0.17
3	Bruno Piazzalunga	Italy	52.11	+0.35
4	Ali Saveh	Iran	57.93	+6.17
5	Ivar Sigmundsson	Iceland	59.46	+7.70
-	Petar Angelov	Bulgaria	DNF	-

Heat F

Rank	Name	Country	Time	Difference
1	Willy Favre	Switzerland	53.65	-
2	Andrey Belokrinkin	Soviet Union	57.46	+3.81
3	Guy Périllat	France	57.71	+4.06
-	Burhan Alankuş	Turkey	DNF	-
-	Jeremy Bujakowski	India	DNF	-
-	Raimo Manninen	Finland	DNF	-

Heat G

Rank	Name	Country	Time	Difference
1	Jimmy Heuga	United States	52.34	-
2	Ivo Mahlknecht	Italy	52.82	+0.48
3	Alfred Hagn	West Germany	54.04	+1.70
4	Tomio Sasaki	Japan	55.98	+3.64

Heat H

Rank	Name	Country	Time	Difference
1	Herbert Huber	Austria	53.04	-
2	Rune Lindström	Sweden	53.85	+0.81
3	Richard Leatherbee	Chile	54.47	+1.43
4	Gerhard Mussner	Italy	54.60	+1.56
5	Dorin Munteanu	Romania	57.72	+4.68
-	Hassan Lahmaoui	Morocco	DQ	-

Heat I

Rank	Name	Country	Time	Difference
1	Aurelio García	Spain	51.44	-
2	Willi Lesch	West Germany	52.07	+0.63
3	Jean-Pierre Augert	France	52.10	+0.66
4	Julian Vasey	Great Britain	56.02	+4.58
5	Reynir Brynjólfsson	Iceland	59.85	+8.41
-	Ghassan Keyrouz	Lebanon	DQ	-

Heat J

Rank	Name	Country	Time	Difference
1	Bjarne Strand	Norway	54.18	-
2	Alain Penz	France	54.63	+0.45
3	Wolfgang Ender	Liechtenstein	55.55	+1.37
4	Félipe Briones	Chile	59.76	+5.58
5	Dimitrios Pappos	Greece	70.88	+16.70
-	Yoshinari Kida	Japan	DQ	-

Heat K

Rank	Name	Country	Time	Difference
1	Karl Schranz	Austria	52.56	-
2	Spider Sabich	United States	53.52	+0.96
3	Jeremy Palmer-Tomkinson	Great Britain	54.35	+1.79
4	Özer Ateşçi	Turkey	70.58	+18.02
-	Jože Gazvoda	Yugoslavia	DQ	-
-	Josef Gassner	Liechtenstein	DNF	-

Heat L

Rank	Name	Country	Time	Difference
1	Olle Rolén	Sweden	54.15	-
2	Peter Frei	Switzerland	55.66	+1.51
3	Blaž Jakopič	Yugoslavia	57.17	+3.02
4	Viktor Belyakov	Soviet Union	58.05	+3.90
5	Michael Dennis	New Zealand	72.75	+18.60
-	Ahmet Kıbıl	Turkey	DQ	-

Heat M

Rank	Name	Country	Time	Difference
1	Billy Kidd	United States	53.37	-
2	Dan Cristea	Romania	53.75	+0.38
3	Peter Duncan	Canada	54.57	+1.20
-	Björn Olsen	Iceland	DQ	-
-	Ryszard Ćwikła	Poland	DQ	-
-	Eo Jae-Sik	South Korea	DQ	-

Heat N

Rank	Name	Country	Time	Difference
1	Rick Chaffee	United States	54.28	-
2	Vasily Melnikov	Soviet Union	54.32	+0.04
3	Andreas Sprecher	Switzerland	54.78	+0.50
4	Thomas Huppert	New Zealand	64.77	+10.49
5	Moussa Jaalouk	Lebanon	73.69	+19.41
-	Yoshiharu Fukuhara	Japan	DQ	-

Heat O

Rank	Name	Country	Time	Difference
1	Bengt-Erik Grahn	Sweden	54.28	-
2	Athanasios Tsimikalis	Greece	62.82	+8.54
-	Milan Pažout	Czechoslovakia	DQ	-
-	Roberto Thostrup	Argentina	DQ	-
-	Scott Henderson	Canada	DQ	-
-	Tsuneo Noto	Japan	DNF	-

Heat P

Rank	Name	Country	Time	Difference
1	Andrzej Bachleda	Poland	53.48	-
2	Carlos Adsera	Spain	56.04	+2.56
3	Hans-Walter Schädler	Liechtenstein	56.07	+2.59
4	Rod Hebron	Canada	56.12	+2.64
5	Said Housni	Morocco	79.93	+26.45
-	Ovaness Meguerdonian	Iran	DNF	-

Heat Q

Rank	Name	Country	Time	Difference
1	Eberhard Riedel	East Germany	53.62	-
2	Carlo Senoner	Italy	54.18	+0.56
3	Gustavo Ezquerra	Argentina	57.09	+3.47
4	Andrej Klinar	Yugoslavia	58.16	+4.54
5	Malcolm Milne	Australia	83.26	+29.64
6	Mohamed Aomar	Morocco	89.54	+35.92

=== Round Two ===
The winner of each heat advanced to the final.

Heat A

Rank	Name	Country	Time	Difference
1	Ulf Ekstam	Finland	55.44	-
2	Ian Todd	Great Britain	57.58	+2.14
3	Kristinn Benediktsson	Iceland	62.05	+6.61
4	Nagib Barrak	Lebanon	85.73	+30.29

Heat B

Rank	Name	Country	Time	Difference
1	Luggi Leitner	West Germany	53.47	-
2	Secundino Rodríguez	Spain	55.44	+1.97
3	Robert Palmer	New Zealand	56.24	+2.77
4	Mehmet Yıldırım	Turkey	62.39	+8.92

Heat C

Rank	Name	Country	Time	Difference
1	Francisco Fernández Ochoa	Spain	56.19	-
2	Luke O'Reilly	Great Britain	56.61	+0.42
3	Murray Gardner	New Zealand	62.08	+5.89
-	Lotfollah Kia Shemshaki	Iran	DNF	-

Heat D

Rank	Name	Country	Time	Difference
1	Max Rieger	West Germany	54.52	-
2	Mario Vera	Chile	58.05	+3.53
3	Mehdi Mouidi	Morocco	70.90	+16.38
-	Fayzollah Band Ali	Iran	DQ	-

Heat E

Rank	Name	Country	Time	Difference
1	Petar Angelov	Bulgaria	57.60	-
2	Ali Saveh	Iran	57.87	+0.27
3	Ivar Sigmundsson	Iceland	62.20	+4.60
-	Bruno Piazzalunga	Italy	DNF	-

Heat F

Rank	Name	Country	Time	Difference
1	Guy Périllat	France	55.37	-
2	Jeremy Bujakowski	India	57.78	+2.41

Heat G

Rank	Name	Country	Time	Difference
1	Alfred Hagn	West Germany	55.43	-
2	Tomio Sasaki	Japan	56.62	+1.19

Heat H

Rank	Name	Country	Time	Difference
1	Richard Leatherbee	Chile	55.51	-
2	Gerhard Mussner	Italy	55.55	+0.04
3	Dorin Munteanu	Romania	56.05	+0.54
4	Hassan Lahmaoui	Morocco	69.16	+13.65

Heat I

Rank	Name	Country	Time	Difference
1	Jean-Pierre Augert	France	54.91	-
2	Julian Vasey	Great Britain	60.24	+5.33
3	Reynir Brynjólfsson	Iceland	64.70	+9.79
4	Ghassan Keyrouz	Lebanon	78.11	+23.20

Heat J

Rank	Name	Country	Time	Difference
1	Wolfgang Ender	Liechtenstein	56.73	-
2	Yoshinari Kida	Japan	57.87	+1.14
3	Dimitrios Pappos	Greece	86.46	+29.73
-	Félipe Briones	Chile	DNF	-

Heat K

Rank	Name	Country	Time	Difference
1	Jeremy Palmer-Tomkinson	Great Britain	56.14	-
2	Josef Gassner	Liechtenstein	57.74	+1.60
3	Jože Gazvoda	Yugoslavia	59.82	+3.68
4	Özer Ateşçi	Turkey	74.83	+18.69

Heat L

Rank	Name	Country	Time	Difference
1	Blaž Jakopič	Yugoslavia	55.07	-
2	Viktor Belyakov	Soviet Union	55.56	+0.49
3	Ahmet Kıbıl	Turkey	64.52	+9.45
4	Michael Dennis	New Zealand	66.78	+11.71

Heat M

Rank	Name	Country	Time	Difference
1	Ryszard Ćwikła	Poland	54.47	-
2	Peter Duncan	Canada	55.07	+0.60
3	Björn Olsen	Iceland	58.46	+3.99
-	Eo Jae-Sik	South Korea	DQ	-

Heat N

Rank	Name	Country	Time	Difference
1	Andreas Sprecher	Switzerland	52.99	-
2	Yoshiharu Fukuhara	Japan	56.82	+3.83
3	Moussa Jaalouk	Lebanon	69.06	+16.07
-	Thomas Huppert	New Zealand	DQ	-

Heat O

Rank	Name	Country	Time	Difference
1	Milan Pažout	Czechoslovakia	55.96	-
2	Tsuneo Noto	Japan	56.60	+0.64
3	Scott Henderson	Canada	56.71	+0.75
4	Roberto Thostrup	Argentina	60.80	+4.84

Heat P

Rank	Name	Country	Time	Difference
1	Rod Hebron	Canada	54.52	-
2	Hans-Walter Schädler	Liechtenstein	55.21	+0.69
3	Ovaness Meguerdonian	Iran	63.41	+8.89

Heat Q

Rank	Name	Country	Time	Difference
1	Malcolm Milne	Australia	58.08	-
2	Andrej Klinar	Yugoslavia	59.36	+1.28
3	Gustavo Ezquerra	Argentina	59.96	+1.88
4	Mohamed Aomar	Morocco	80.03	+21.95
