= Alpine skiing at the 1968 Winter Olympics – Men's giant slalom =

Men's giant slalom at the X Olympic Winter Games
- Alpine skiing
- Venue: Chamrousse
- Date: February 11–12, 1968
- Competitors: 101 from 33 nations
- Winning time: 3:29.28

Medalists
1st place, gold medalist(s)		Jean-Claude Killy	France
2nd place, silver medalist(s)		Willy Favre	Switzerland
3rd place, bronze medalist(s)		Heini Messner	Austria

The Men's giant slalom competition of the Grenoble 1968 Olympics was held at Chamrousse.

The defending world champion was Guy Perillat of France, while France's Jean-Claude Killy was the defending World Cup giant slalom champion, who also led the 1968 World Cup, along with Switzerland's Edmund Bruggmann.

== Results ==
Rank	Name	Country	Run 1	Run 2	Total	Difference
1st place, gold medalist(s)	Jean-Claude Killy	France	1:42.74	1:46.54	3:29.28	—
2nd place, silver medalist(s)	Willy Favre	Switzerland	1:43.94	1:47.56	3:31.50	+2.22
3rd place, bronze medalist(s)	Heini Messner	Austria	1:45.16	1:46.67	3:31.83	+2.55
4	Guy Périllat	France	1:44.78	1:47.28	3:32.06	+2.78
5	Billy Kidd	United States	1:45.91	1:46.46	3:32.37	+3.09
6	Karl Schranz	Austria	1:45.28	1:47.80	3:33.08	+3.80
7	Dumeng Giovanoli	Switzerland	1:46.13	1:47.42	3:33.55	+4.27
8	Gerhard Nenning	Austria	1:46.47	1:47.14	3:33.61	+4.33
9	Georges Mauduit	France	1:44.86	1:48.92	3:33.78	+4.50
10	Jimmy Heuga	United States	1:45.46	1:48.43	3:33.89	+4.61
11	Bruno Piazzalunga	Italy	1:45.95	1:48.57	3:34.52	+5.24
12	Edy Bruggmann	Switzerland	1:46.00	1:48.91	3:34.91	+5.63
13	Andrzej Bachleda	Poland	1:46.46	1:49.25	3:35.71	+6.43
14	Spider Sabich	United States	1:46.34	1:49.81	3:36.15	+6.87
15	Rick Chaffee	United States	1:46.44	1:49.75	3:36.19	+6.91
16	Rune Lindström	Sweden	1:46.94	1:50.11	3:37.05	+7.77
17	Gerhard Mussner	Italy	1:47.27	1:49.93	3:37.20	+7.92
18	Peter Duncan	Canada	1:47.06	1:51.11	3:38.17	+8.89
19	Håkon Mjøen	Norway	1:47.63	1:50.71	3:38.34	+9.06
20	Olle Rolén	Sweden	1:47.52	1:50.83	3:38.35	+9.07
21	Scott Henderson	Canada	1:47.85	1:50.65	3:38.50	+9.22
22	Willi Lesch	West Germany	1:47.48	1:51.35	3:38.83	+9.55
23	Luggi Leitner	West Germany	1:47.64	1:51.21	3:38.85	+9.57
24	Sepp Heckelmiller	West Germany	1:48.25	1:50.70	3:38.95	+9.67
25	Jon Terje Øverland	Norway	1:49.30	1:50.27	3:39.57	+10.29
26	Ivo Mahlknecht	Italy	1:49.04	1:51.04	3:40.08	+10.80
27	Milan Pažout	Czechoslovakia	1:48.98	1:51.34	3:40.32	+11.04
28	Stefan Kälin	Switzerland	1:48.98	1:51.44	3:40.42	+11.14
29	Bjarne Strand	Norway	1:49.69	1:51.48	3:41.17	+11.89
30	Raimo Manninen	Finland	1:49.92	1:52.11	3:42.03	+12.75
31	Josef Gassner	Liechtenstein	1:51.10	1:51.28	3:42.38	+13.10
32	Wolfgang Ender	Liechtenstein	1:50.57	1:52.86	3:43.43	+14.15
33	Malcolm Milne	Australia	1:51.25	1:52.60	3:43.85	+14.57
34	Jaroslav Janda	Czechoslovakia	1:52.20	1:52.07	3:44.27	+14.99
35	Jeremy Palmer-Tomkinson	Great Britain	1:53.24	1:51.06	3:44.30	+15.02
36	Ulf Ekstam	Finland	1:53.09	1:52.66	3:45.75	+16.47
37	Ryszard Ćwikła	Poland	1:51.79	1:54.17	3:45.96	+16.68
38	Francisco Fernández Ochoa	Spain	1:52.57	1:53.40	3:45.97	+16.69
39	Bengt-Erik Grahn	Sweden	1:48.68	1:57.78	3:46.46	+17.18
40	Tsuneo Noto	Japan	1:52.55	1:54.10	3:46.65	+17.37
41	Eberhard Riedel	East Germany	1:55.59	1:51.08	3:46.67	+17.39
42	Aurelio García	Spain	1:51.57	1:56.61	3:48.18	+18.90
43	Blaž Jakopič	Yugoslavia	1:53.77	1:54.77	3:48.54	+19.26
44	Antonio Campaña	Spain	1:53.77	1:55.18	3:48.95	+19.67
45	Vasily Melnikov	Soviet Union	1:52.42	1:56.55	3:48.97	+19.69
46	Viktor Belyakov	Soviet Union	1:55.72	1:53.55	3:49.27	+19.99
47	Tomio Sasaki	Japan	1:53.16	1:56.99	3:50.15	+20.87
48	Richard Leatherbee	Chile	1:53.53	1:57.18	3:50.71	+21.43
49	Dan Cristea	Romania	1:54.66	1:56.98	3:51.64	+22.36
50	Yoshiharu Fukuhara	Japan	1:53.96	1:58.01	3:51.97	+22.69
51	Mario Vera	Chile	1:56.46	1:56.04	3:52.50	+23.22
52	Andrej Klinar	Yugoslavia	1:55.89	1:56.94	3:52.83	+23.55
52	Andrey Belokrinkin	Soviet Union	1:56.47	1:56.36	3:52.83	+23.55
54	Luke O'Reilly	Great Britain	1:56.25	1:57.77	3:54.02	+24.74
55	Dorin Munteanu	Romania	1:55.78	1:59.18	3:54.96	+25.68
56	Albert Frick	Liechtenstein	1:57.75	1:58.15	3:55.90	+26.62
57	Hans-Walter Schädler	Liechtenstein	2:01.38	1:55.58	3:56.96	+27.68
58	Jože Gazvoda	Yugoslavia	1:58.26	1:58.89	3:57.15	+27.87
59	Jorge Rodríguez	Spain	1:57.92	1:59.32	3:57.24	+27.96
60	Ian Todd	Great Britain	1:59.66	1:57.81	3:57.47	+28.19
61	Roberto Thostrup	Argentina	1:58.92	1:58.70	3:57.62	+28.34
62	Julian Vasey	Great Britain	1:59.44	2:00.29	3:59.73	+30.45
63	Gustavo Ezquerra	Argentina	1:59.60	2:00.51	4:00.11	+30.83
64	Petar Angelov	Bulgaria	1:59.87	2:01.96	4:01.83	+32.55
65	Jeremy Bujakowski	India	2:01.45	2:00.48	4:01.93	+32.65
66	Félipe Briones	Chile	2:01.83	2:01.97	4:03.80	+34.52
67	Reynir Brynjólfsson	Iceland	2:04.73	2:00.58	4:05.31	+36.03
68	Ivar Sigmundsson	Iceland	2:03.42	2:02.44	4:05.86	+36.58
69	Kristinn Benediktsson	Iceland	2:05.84	2:03.03	4:08.87	+39.59
70	Fayzollah Band Ali	Iran	2:05.44	2:04.64	4:10.08	+40.80
71	Lotfollah Kia Shemshaki	Iran	2:05.10	2:07.45	4:12.55	+43.27
72	Björn Olsen	Iceland	2:05.79	2:10.81	4:16.60	+47.32
73	Ovaness Meguerdonian	Iran	2:08.10	2:08.58	4:16.68	+47.40
74	Michael Dennis	New Zealand	2:08.69	2:09.43	4:18.12	+48.84
75	Thomas Huppert	New Zealand	2:07.60	2:13.20	4:20.80	+51.52
76	Murray Gardner	New Zealand	2:13.37	2:07.90	4:21.27	+51.99
77	Ali Saveh	Iran	2:17.78	2:05.94	4:23.72	+54.44
78	Athanasios Tsimikalis	Greece	2:14.10	2:10.98	4:25.08	+55.80
79	Dimitrios Pappos	Greece	2:16.22	2:15.86	4:32.08	+62.80
80	Moussa Jaalouk	Lebanon	2:15.54	2:17.89	4:33.43	+64.15
81	Nagib Barrak	Lebanon	2:14.84	2:24.06	4:38.90	+69.62
82	Ahmet Kıbıl	Turkey	2:19.69	2:20.54	4:40.23	+70.95
83	Said Housni	Morocco	2:24.40	2:16.28	4:40.68	+71.40
84	Mehmet Yıldırım	Turkey	2:23.15	2:23.71	4:46.86	+77.58
85	Ghassan Keyrouz	Lebanon	2:22.43	2:24.76	4:47.19	+77.91
86	Hassan Lahmaoui	Morocco	2:24.97	2:23.69	4:48.66	+79.38
87	Zeki Erylıdırım	Turkey	2:37.07	2:29.72	5:06.79	+97.51
88	Eo Jae-sik	South Korea	2:45.53	2:21.45	5:06.98	+97.70
-	Werner Bleiner	Austria	1:46.56	DQ	-	-
-	Rod Hebron	Canada	1:47.07	DNF	-	-
-	Lars Olsson	Sweden	1:48.69	DQ	-	-
-	Renato Valentini	Italy	1:50.03	DNS	-	-
-	Bernard Orcel	France	DQ	-	-	-
-	Gerhard Prinzing	West Germany	DQ	-	-	-
-	Keith Shepherd	Canada	DQ	-	-	-
-	Otto Tschudi	Norway	DNF	-	-	-
-	Robert Palmer	New Zealand	DNF	-	-	-
-	Mohamed Aomar	Morocco	DNF	-	-	-
-	Mimoun Ouitot	Morocco	DNF	-	-	-
-	Yoshinari Kida	Japan	DQ	-	-	-
-	Özer Ateşçi	Turkey	DQ	-	-	-
