= Alpine skiing at the 1968 Winter Olympics – Men's downhill =

Men's downhill at the X Olympic Winter Games
- Alpine skiing
- Venue: Chamrousse
- Date: February 9, 1968
- Competitors: 86 from 29 nations
- Winning time: 1:59.85

Medalists
1st place, gold medalist(s)		Jean-Claude Killy	France
2nd place, silver medalist(s)		Guy Périllat	France
3rd place, bronze medalist(s)		Jean-Daniel Dätwyler	Switzerland

Men's Downhill
- Location: Chamrousse
- Vertical: 840 m (2,756 ft)
- Top elevation: 2,252 m (7,388 ft)
- Base elevation: 1,412 m (4,633 ft)

The Men's Downhill competition of the Grenoble 1968 Olympics was held at Chamrousse on Friday, 9 February.

The defending world champion was Jean-Claude Killy of France, who was also the defending World Cup downhill champion and Austria's Gerhard Nenning led the current season.

Killy won the gold medal, teammate Guy Périllat took the silver, and Jean-Daniel Dätwyler of Switzerland won the bronze. Defending Olympic champion Egon Zimmermann of Austria finished thirteenth.

The starting gate was at an elevation of 2,252 m (7,388 ft) above sea level, with a vertical drop of 840 m (2,756 ft). The course length was 2.890 km (1.80 mi) and Killy's winning run of 119.85 seconds resulted in an average speed of 86.8085 km/h (53.9 mph), with an average vertical descent rate of 7.009 m/s (23.0 ft/s).

== Results ==
Rank	Bib	Name	Country	Time	Difference
1st place, gold medalist(s)	14	Jean-Claude Killy	France	1:59.85	—
2nd place, silver medalist(s)	1	Guy Périllat	France	1:59.93	+0.08
3rd place, bronze medalist(s)	4	Jean-Daniel Dätwyler	Switzerland	2:00.32	+0.47
4	9	Heini Messner	Austria	2:01.03	+1.18
5	11	Karl Schranz	Austria	2:01.89	+2.04
6	3	Ivo Mahlknecht	Italy	2:02.00	+2.15
7	21	Gerhard Prinzing	West Germany	2:02.10	+2.25
8	13	Bernard Orcel	France	2:02.22	+2.37
9	10	Gerhard Nenning	Austria	2:02.31	+2.46
10	2	Edy Bruggmann	Switzerland	2:02.36	+2.51
11	6	Gerhard Mussner	Italy	2:02.50	+2.65
12	28	Luggi Leitner	West Germany	2:02.54	+2.69
13	5	Egon Zimmermann	Austria	2:02.55	+2.70
14	8	Jos Minsch	Switzerland	2:02.76	+2.91
15	7	Franz Vogler	West Germany	2:02.94	+3.09
16	27	Dumeng Giovanoli	Switzerland	2:02.98	+3.13
17	24	Bjarne Strand	Norway	2:03.20	+3.35
18	12	Billy Kidd	United States	2:03.40	+3.55
19	19	Dieter Fersch	West Germany	2:03.41	+3.56
20	15	Léo Lacroix	France	2:03.86	+4.01
21	20	Dennis McCoy	United States	2:04.82	+4.97
22	23	Teresio Vachet	Italy	2:04.90	+5.05
23	44	Jon Terje Øverland	Norway	2:05.34	+5.49
24	30	Malcolm Milne	Australia	2:05.36	+5.51
25	42	Jeremy Palmer-Tomkinson	Great Britain	2:05.43	+5.58
26	57	Andrzej Bachleda-Curuś	Poland	2:05.48	+5.63
27	48	Wayne Henderson	Canada	2:05.56	+5.71
28	18	Renato Valentini	Italy	2:05.61	+5.76
29	41	Rune Lindström	Sweden	2:05.69	+5.84
30	40	Ulf Ekstam	Finland	2:06.14	+6.29
31	31	Gerry Rinaldi	Canada	2:06.30	+6.45
32	45	Aurelio García	Spain	2:06.84	+6.99
33	47	Josef Gassner	Liechtenstein	2:06.91	+7.06
34	63	Lasse Hamre	Norway	2:06.93	+7.08
35	43	Milan Pažout	Czechoslovakia	2:07.45	+7.60
36	38	Jaroslav Janda	Czechoslovakia	2:07.71	+7.86
37	50	Wolfgang Ender	Liechtenstein	2:08.08	+8.23
38	62	Francisco Fernández Ochoa	Spain	2:08.67	+8.82
39	53	Luciano del Cacho	Spain	2:08.85	+9.00
40	92	Viktor Belyakov	Soviet Union	2:09.32	+9.47
41	46	Andrej Klinar	Yugoslavia	2:09.61	+9.76
42	54	Robert Palmer	New Zealand	2:09.79	+9.94
43	68	Per-Olov Richardsson	Sweden	2:09.83	+9.98
44	61	Ian Todd	Great Britain	2:10.00	+10.15
45	73	Tsuneo Noto	Japan	2:10.32	+10.47
46	71	Mario Vera	Chile	2:10.44	+10.59
47	69	Jože Gazvoda	Yugoslavia	2:10.51	+10.66
48	64	Ryszard Ćwikła	Poland	2:10.63	+10.78
49	72	Andrey Belokrinkin	Soviet Union	2:10.98	+11.13
50	67	Luke O'Reilly	Great Britain	2:10.99	+11.14
51	58	Blaž Jakopič	Yugoslavia	2:11.00	+11.15
52	56	Antonio Campaña	Spain	2:11.11	+11.26
53	70	Jeremy Bujakowski	India	2:11.82	+11.97
54	74	Yoshiharu Fukuhara	Japan	2:14.09	+14.24
55	96	Gustavo Ezquerra	Argentina	2:17.11	+17.26
56	59	David Borradaile	Great Britain	2:17.31	+17.46
57	90	Roberto Thostrup	Argentina	2:17.35	+17.50
58	86	Richard Leatherbee	Chile	2:17.86	+18.01
59	93	Hitonari Maruyama	Japan	2:18.04	+18.19
60	87	Félipe Briones	Chile	2:18.07	+18.22
61	91	Thomas Huppert	New Zealand	2:18.29	+18.44
62	98	Dan Cristea	Romania	2:18.52	+18.67
63	89	Petar Angelov	Bulgaria	2:18.71	+18.86
64	88	Juichi Maruyama	Japan	2:19.33	+19.48
65	78	Dorin Munteanu	Romania	2:22.53	+22.68
66	81	Lotfollah Kia Shemshaki	Iran	2:23.60	+23.75
67	100	Özer Ateşçi	Turkey	2:25.18	+25.33
68	103	Fayzollah Band Ali	Iran	2:27.07	+27.22
69	102	Ovaness Meguerdonian	Iran	2:30.25	+30.40
70	97	Athanasios Tsimikalis	Greece	2:36.93	+37.08
71	101	Mehmet Yıldırım	Turkey	2:40.79	+40.94
72	79	Dimitrios Pappos	Greece	2:44.10	+44.25
73	82	Ali Saveh	Iran	2:47.88	+48.03
-	17	Jere Elliott	United States	DNF	-
-	22	Rod Hebron	Canada	DNF	-
-	26	Jim Barrows	United States	DNF	-
-	29	Eberhard Riedel	East Germany	DNF	-
-	49	Otto Tschudi	Norway	DNF	-
-	60	Hans-Walter Schädler	Liechtenstein	DNF	-
-	80	Arnold Beck	Liechtenstein	DNF	-
-	83	Bahattin Topal	Turkey	DNF	-
-	99	Mehmet Gökcan	Turkey	DNF	-
-	25	Peter Duncan	Canada	DQ	-
-	39	Raimo Manninen	Finland	DQ	-
-	55	Vasily Melnikov	Soviet Union	DQ	-
-	95	Murray Gardner	New Zealand	DQ	-
-	77	Hernan Briones	Chile	DNS	-
-	94	Michael Dennis	New Zealand	DNS	-
