= FIS Alpine World Ski Championships 1970 – Men's downhill =

Men's downhill at the FIS Alpine World Ski Championships 1970
- Location: Val Gardena, Italy
- Date: 15 February
- Competitors: 91 from 29 nations
- Winning time: 2:24.57

Medalists
gold medal	Bernhard Russi	Switzerland
silver medal	Karl Cordin	Austria
bronze medal	Malcolm Milne	Australia

Men's Downhill
- Location: Val Gardena, Italy
- Vertical: 830 m (2,723 ft)
- Longest run: 3.750 km (2.33 mi)

The Men's downhill competition was the final event of the FIS Alpine World Ski Championships 1970, held on Sunday, 15 February.

== Results ==
Rank	Bib	Name	Country	Time	Difference
1st place, gold medalist(s)	15	Bernhard Russi	Switzerland	2:24.57	—
2nd place, silver medalist(s)	3	Karl Cordin	Austria	2:24.79	+ 0.22
3rd place, bronze medalist(s)	14	Malcolm Milne	Australia	2:25.09	+ 0.52
4	6	Karl Schranz	Austria	2:25.49	+ 0.92
5	13	Billy Kidd	United States	2:25.52	+ 0.95
5	23	Marcello Varallo	Italy	2:25.52	+ 0.95
7	12	Rudi Sailer	Austria	2:26.12	+ 1.55
8	5	Jean-Luc Pinel	France	2:26.59	+ 2.02
9	41	Anders Hansson	Sweden	2:26.89	+ 2.32
10	18	Jon-Terje Oeverland	Norway	2:27.09	+ 2.52
11	17	Ruud Pyles	United States	2:27.13	+ 2.56
12	24	Edmund Bruggmann	Switzerland	2:27.16	+ 2.59
13	48	Erik Håker	Norway	2:27.46	+ 2.89
14	4	Jean-Daniel Dätwyler	Switzerland	2:27.47	+ 2.90
15	20	Gary Rinaldi	Canada	2:27.84	+ 3.27
16	19	Hans-Joerg Schlager	West Germany	2:27.92	+ 3.35
17	9	Heini Messner	Austria	2:28.39	+ 3.82
18	36	Rune Lindström	Sweden	2:28.71	+ 4.14
19	7	Keith Shepherd	Canada	2:28.92	+ 4.35
20	25	Antonio Campaña	Spain	2:29.03	+ 4.46
21	21	Aurelio García-Oliver	Spain	2:29.22	+ 4.65
22	44	Eberhard Schmalzl	Italy	2:29.23	+ 4.66
23	42	Dave Irwin	Canada	2:29.31	+ 4.74
24	2	Andreas Sprecher	Switzerland	2:29.63	+ 5.06
25	10	Henry Duvillard	France	2:29.80	+ 5.23
26	8	Bob Cochran	United States	2:29.90	+ 5.33
27	47	Olle Rolen	Sweden	2:29.99	+ 5.42
28	30	Peter Duncan	Canada	2:30.20	+ 5.63
29	27	Hans Boerge	Norway	2:30.27	+ 5.70
30	65	Tadeusz Kaim	Poland	2:30.55	+ 5.98
31	28	Mike Lafferty	United States	2:30.58	+ 6.01
32	38	Andrzej Bachleda-Curus	Poland	2:30.68	+ 6.11
33	25	Helmuth Schmalzl	Italy	2:30.93	+ 6.36
34	45	Christian Neureuther	West Germany	2:31.09	+ 6.52
35	39	Masahiko Otsue	Japan	2:31.23	+ 6.66
36	49	Max Rieger	West Germany	2:31.50	+ 6.93
37	1	Bernard Orcel	France	2:31.51	+ 6.94
38	31	Willi Lesch	West Germany	2:31.65	+ 7.08
39	59	Luke O'Reilly	(United Kingdom) Great Britain	2:31.87	+ 7.30
40	40	Jaroslav Janda	Czechoslovakia	2:32.46	+ 7.89
41	37	Jože Gazvoda	Yugoslavia	2:32.69	+ 8.12
42	29	Francisco Fernández-Ochoa	Spain	2:33.15	+ 8.58
43	22	Patrick Russel	France	2:33.64	+ 9.07
44	57	Royston Varley	(United Kingdom) Great Britain	2:34.41	+ 9.84
45	35	Julian Vasey	(United Kingdom) Great Britain	2:34.59	+ 10.02
46	58	Jan Bachleda	Poland	2:34.99	+ 10.42
47	84	Matti Lepannen	Finland	2:35.64	+ 11.07
48	43	Blaž Jakopič	Yugoslavia	2:35.81	+ 11.24
49	61	Dusan Javnik	Yugoslavia	2:35.82	+ 11.25
50	52	Anatolij Tormoshin	Soviet Union	2:36.51	+ 11.94
51	74	Tuomo Kilpelainen	Finland	2:36.58	+ 12.01
52	71	Christian Woomersley	New Zealand	2:36.93	+ 12.36
53	53	Raimo Manninen	Finland	2:37.23	+ 12.66
54	56	Miloslav Sochor	Czechoslovakia	2:37.42	+ 12.85
55	86	Willi Frommelt	Liechtenstein	2:37.52	+ 12.95
56	76	Vasiliy Melnikov	Soviet Union	2:37.65	+ 13.08
57	51	Ryszard Cwikla	Poland	2:37.84	+ 13.27
58	68	Teodorico Fabi	Brazil	2:38.11	+ 13.54
59	55	Luciano Del Cacho	Spain	2:38.24	+ 13.67
60	79	Felipe Briones	Chile	2:38.71	+ 14.14
61	82	Iain Finlayson	(United Kingdom) Great Britain	2:38.80	+ 14.23
62	85	Federico-Emilio Tutzaner	Argentina	2:39.13	+ 14.56
63	92	Carlos-Antonio Perner	Argentina	2:39.19	+ 14.62
64	62	Patrick Escourbiac	Andorra	2:39.25	+ 14.68
65	60	Resmi Resmiev	Bulgaria	2:39.68	+ 15.11
66	67	Petar Angelov	Bulgaria	2:39.79	+ 15.22
67	63	Virgil Brenci	Romania	2:40.63	+ 16.06
68	73	Dan Christea	Romania	2:41.18	+ 16.61
69	69	Jiri Skampa	Czechoslovakia	2:41.58	+ 17.01
70	54	George Vulpe	Romania	2:42.49	+ 17.92
71	77	Francisco Giobbi	Brazil	2:42.64	+ 18.07
72	88	Ivan Penev	Bulgaria	2:43.06	+ 18.49
73	81	Robert Blanchaer	Belgium	2:43.10	+ 18.53
74	78	Pavel Schalamanov	Bulgaria	2:43.23	+ 18.66
75	87	Pierre Descampes	Belgium	2:44.08	+ 19.51
76	66	Gustavo-Osvaldo Ezquera	Argentina	2:44.70	+ 20.13
77	70	Antoni Naudi	Andorra	2:45.90	+ 21.33
78	83	Athanasios Tsimikalis	Greece	2:49.91	+ 25.34
79	64	Michel Poussier	Andorra	2:50.16	+ 25.59
80	72	Bo Ussing	Denmark	2:53.50	+ 28.93
81	89	Viktor Bourlas	Greece	2:55.17	+ 30.60
82	90	Spyridon Theodorou	Greece	2:56.02	+ 31.45
DSQ	11	Stefano Anzi	Italy	2:25.56	+ 0.99
	91	Alexandris Takis	Greece	DNF	
	46	Ulf Ekstam	Finland	DNS	
		Franz Vogler	West Germany	DNS	
