= Morocco at the 1968 Winter Olympics =

- IOC code: MAR
- NOC: Moroccan Olympic Committee; Arabic: اللجنة الأولمبية الوطنية المغربية
- Website: www.cnom.org.ma (in French)

in Grenoble
- Competitors: 5 (men) in 1 sport
- Medals: Gold 0 Silver 0 Bronze 0 Total 0

Winter Olympics appearances (overview)
- 1968; 1972–1980; 1984; 1988; 1992; 1994–2006; 2010; 2014; 2018; 2022; 2026

Morocco competed in the Winter Olympic Games for the first time at the 1968 Winter Olympics in Grenoble, France.

== Alpine skiing ==
Men

Athlete	Event	Race 1		Race 2		Total	
Athlete	Event	Time	Rank	Time	Rank	Time	Rank
Mimoun Ouitot	Giant Slalom	DNF	–	–	–	DNF	–
Mohamed Aomar	Giant Slalom	DNF	–	–	–	DNF	–
Hassan Lahmaoui	Giant Slalom	2:24.97	90	2:23.69	84	4:48.66	86
Said Housni	Giant Slalom	2:24.40	89	2:16.28	80	4:40.68	83

Men's slalom

Athlete	Heat 1		Heat 2		Final					
Athlete	Time	Rank	Time	Rank	Time 1	Rank	Time 2	Rank	Total	Rank
Said Housni	1:19.93	5	DNS	-	did not advance					
Mohamed Aomar	1:29.54	6	1:20.03	4	did not advance					
Hassan Lahmaoui	DSQ	–	1:09.16	4	did not advance					
Mehdi Mouidi	1:13.61	6	1:10.90	3	did not advance					
