= Iceland at the 1968 Winter Olympics =

- IOC code: ISL
- NOC: Olympic Committee of Iceland

in Grenoble
- Competitors: 4 (men) in 1 sport
- Flag bearer: Kristinn Benediktsson
- Medals: Gold 0 Silver 0 Bronze 0 Total 0

Winter Olympics appearances (overview)
- 1948; 1952; 1956; 1960; 1964; 1968; 1972; 1976; 1980; 1984; 1988; 1992; 1994; 1998; 2002; 2006; 2010; 2014; 2018; 2022; 2026

Iceland competed at the 1968 Winter Olympics in Grenoble, France.

== Alpine skiing ==
Men

Athlete	Event	Race 1		Race 2		Total	
Athlete	Event	Time	Rank	Time	Rank	Time	Rank
Kristinn Benediktsson	Giant Slalom	2:05.84	76	2:03.03	69	4:08.87	69
Björn Olsen	Giant Slalom	2:05.79	75	2:10.81	76	4:16.60	72
Reynir Brynjólfsson	Giant Slalom	2:04.73	72	2:00.58	65	4:05.31	67
Ivar Sigmundsson	Giant Slalom	2:03.42	71	2:02.44	68	4:05.86	68

Men's slalom

Athlete	Heat 1		Heat 2		Final					
Athlete	Time	Rank	Time	Rank	Time 1	Rank	Time 2	Rank	Total	Rank
Björn Olsen	DSQ	–	58.46	3	did not advance					
Reynir Brynjólfsson	59.85	5	1:04.70	3	did not advance					
Ivar Sigmundsson	59.46	5	1:02.20	3	did not advance					
Kristinn Benediktsson	1:07.66	6	1:02.05	3	did not advance					
