= Eberhard Riedel =

German alpine skier (1938–2026)

Personal information
- Born: 14 February 1938 Lauter, Gau Saxony, Germany
- Died: 5 April 2026 (aged 88)
- Height: 172 cm (5 ft 8 in)

Skiing career
- Sport: Alpine skiing ♂

Olympics
- Teams: 1960, 1964, 1968
- Updated on 30 May 2016

Eberhard Riedel (14 February 1938 – 5 April 2026) was a German alpine skier who competed in the 1960, 1964 and the 1968 Winter Olympics.

Riedel was born in Lauter, Saxony, Germany on 14 February 1938. He died on 5 April 2026, at the age of 88.

== Olympic events ==
1960 Winter Olympics in Squaw Valley, competing for United Team of Germany:

- Men's downhill – 16th place

1964 Winter Olympics in Innsbruck, competing for United Team of Germany:

- Men's giant slalom – 15th place
- Men's slalom – 30th place

1968 Winter Olympics in Grenoble, competing for East Germany:

- Men's downhill – did not finish
- Men's giant slalom – 41st place
- Men's slalom – 13th place
