= Hitonari Maruyama =

Japanese alpine skier (born 1942)

Personal information
- Nationality: Japanese
- Born: 21 April 1942 (age 83); Nagano, Nagano, Japan

Sport
- Sport: Alpine skiing

Hitonari Maruyama (born 21 April 1942) is a Japanese alpine skier. He competed in the men's downhill at the 1968 Winter Olympics.
