= Burhan Alankuş =

Turkish alpine skier (born 1950)

Personal information
- Nationality: Turkish
- Born: 2 May 1950 (age 74); Sarıkamış, Turkey

Sport
- Sport: Alpine skiing

Burhan Alankuş (born 2 May 1950) is a Turkish alpine skier. He competed in the men's slalom at the 1968 Winter Olympics.
