= Australia at the 1968 Winter Olympics =

- IOC code: AUS
- NOC: Australian Olympic Committee
- Website: www.olympics.com.au

in Grenoble
- Competitors: 3 in 3 sports
- Flag bearer: Malcolm Milne
- Medals: Gold 0 Silver 0 Bronze 0 Total 0

Winter Olympics appearances (overview)
- 1936; 1948; 1952; 1956; 1960; 1964; 1968; 1972; 1976; 1980; 1984; 1988; 1992; 1994; 1998; 2002; 2006; 2010; 2014; 2018; 2022; 2026

Australia competed at the 1968 Winter Olympics in Grenoble, France. Three athletes were sent, and Australia competed in alpine skiing, cross-country skiing, and speed skating.

Malcolm Milne, brother of Ross Milne, who died while practising for the 1964 Winter Olympics, represented Australia in alpine skiing. He gained the best results for Australia in that Olympics, and one of the best slalom results ever for any Australian male.

This was the first of six Olympics for speed skater Colin Coates.

== Alpine skiing ==
Men

Athlete	Event	Qualifying				Final					
Athlete	Event	Run 1	Rank	Run 2	Rank	Run 1	Rank	Run 2	Rank	Total	Rank
Malcolm Milne	Downhill	—N/a								2:05.36	24
Malcolm Milne	Giant slalom	—N/a				1:51.25	38	1:52.60	35	3:43.85	33
Malcolm Milne	Slalom	1:23.26	5	58.08	1 Q	56.36	41	56.06	25	1:52.42	24

== Cross-country skiing ==
Men

Athlete	Event	Race	
Athlete	Event	Time	Rank
Ross Martin	15 km	58:00.2	60
Ross Martin	30 km	1:55:17.3	60

== Speed skating ==
Athlete	Event	Final	
Athlete	Event	Time	Rank
Colin Coates	500 m	43.3	41
Colin Coates	1500 m	2:16.7	49

== See also ==
- Australia at the Winter Olympics
