= Pažout =

Pažout (Czech and Slovak feminine: Pažoutová) is a surname. Notable people with the surname include:

- Andrea Pažoutová (born 1979), Czech judoka
- Milan Pažout (born 1948), Slovak skier
- Ondřej Pažout (born 1998), Czech skier
