= Juichi Maruyama =

Japanese alpine skier (born 1945)

Personal information
- Nationality: Japanese
- Born: 23 February 1945 (age 80); Nagano, Nagano, Japan

Sport
- Sport: Alpine skiing

Juichi Maruyama (born 23 February 1945) is a Japanese alpine skier. He competed in the men's downhill at the 1968 Winter Olympics.
