= Richardsson =

Richardsson is a Swedish patronymic surname meaning "son of Richard". Notable people with the surname include:

- Daniel Richardsson (born 1982), Swedish cross-country skier
- Per-Olov Richardsson (born 1942), Swedish alpine skier
- Erlingur Richardsson (born 1972), Icelandic handball player
- Richard Richardsson (snowboarder) (born 1974), Swedish snowboarder
- Richard Richardsson (footballer) (born 1979), Swedish footballer
- Camilla Richardsson (born 1993), Finnish middle-distance runner

== See also ==
- Richardson (surname)
- Tony Rickardsson
