= Ćwikła =

Ćwikła may refer to:

- Red chrain, or beet-and-horseradish relish, also known in Polish as ćwikła z chrzanem
- Ryszard Ćwikła (1946–1992), Polish alpine skier
