= Arnold Beck (alpine skier) =

Liechtenstein alpine skier (1949–2014)

Arnold Beck (15 January 1949 – 10 July 2014) was a Liechtensteiner alpine skier who competed in the 1968 Winter Olympics.
