= Wayne Henderson (alpine skier) =

Canadian alpine skier (born 1944)

Wayne Henderson (born 28 June 1944) is a Canadian former alpine skier who competed in the 1968 Winter Olympics.
