= Jean-Claude Killy =

French alpine skier (born 1943)

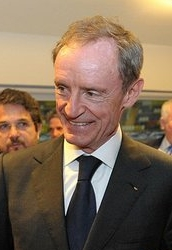
- Jean-Claude Killy in Moscow in May 2012

Personal information
- Born: 30 August 1943 (age 82) Saint-Cloud, Seine-et-Oise, France
- Height: 178 cm (5 ft 10 in)

Skiing career
- Sport: Alpine skiing
- Retired: April 1968 (age 24) (World Cup) - November 1972 (age 29) Again from 1976 (World Pro Ski Tour)
- Disciplines: Downhill, giant slalom, slalom, combined
- World Cup debut: January 1967 (age 23) inaugural season

Olympics
- Teams: 2 – (1964, 1968)
- Medals: 3 (3 gold)

World Championships
- Teams: 4 – (1962, 1964, 1966, 1968) includes two Olympics (injured in 1962)
- Medals: 6 (6 gold)

World Cup
- Seasons: 2 – (1967, 1968)
- Wins: 18 – (6 DH, 7 GS, 5 SL)
- Podiums: 24 – (8 DH, 9 GS, 7 SL)
- Overall titles: 2 – (1967, '68)
- Discipline titles: 4 – (1 DH, 2 GS, 1 SL)
Medal record
Men's alpine skiing
Representing France
World Cup race podiums
Event	1st	2nd	3rd
Slalom	5	1	1
Giant slalom	7	1	1
Downhill	6	1	1
Total	18	3	3
Olympic Games
Gold medal – first place	1968 Grenoble	Downhill
Gold medal – first place	1968 Grenoble	Giant slalom
Gold medal – first place	1968 Grenoble	Slalom
World Championships
Gold medal – first place	1966 Portillo	Downhill
Gold medal – first place	1966 Portillo	Combined
Gold medal – first place	1968 Grenoble	Downhill
Gold medal – first place	1968 Grenoble	Giant slalom
Gold medal – first place	1968 Grenoble	Slalom
Gold medal – first place	1968 Grenoble	Combined

Jean-Claude Killy (born 30 August 1943) is a French former World Cup alpine ski racer. He dominated the sport in the late 1960s, and was a triple Olympic champion, winning the three alpine events at the 1968 Winter Olympics, becoming the most successful athlete there. He also won the first two World Cup titles, in 1967 and 1968.

== Early life ==
Killy was born in Saint-Cloud, a suburb of Paris, during the German occupation of World War II, but was brought up in Val-d'Isère in the Alps, where his family had relocated in 1945 following the war. His father, Robert, was a former Spitfire pilot for the Free French, and opened a ski shop in the Savoie village, and would later operate a hotel. In 1950, his mother Madeline abandoned the family for another man, leaving Robert to raise Jean-Claude, age 7, his older sister (France), and their infant brother (Mic). Jean-Claude was sent to boarding school in Chambéry, 80 miles (130 km) down the valley, but he despised being shut up in a classroom.

== Early career ==
Killy turned his attention to skiing rather than school. His father allowed him to drop out at age 15, and he made the French national junior team a year later. As a young racer, Killy was fast, but did not usually complete his races, and the early 1960s were not entirely successful for him.

In December 1961, at age 18, Killy won his first international race, a giant slalom. The event took place in his home village of Val-d'Isère. Killy had started 39th, a position that should have been a severe disadvantage.

The French coach picked Killy for the giant slalom in the 1962 World Championships in Chamonix, France, 50 miles (80 km) away in the shadow of Mont Blanc. But Killy, unaware of his selection, was still attempting to qualify for the downhill event in northeastern Italy at Cortina d'Ampezzo. Only three weeks before the world championships, he skied in his typical reckless style. About two hundred yards (180 m) from the finish, Killy hit a stretch of ice in a compression and went down, rose immediately, then crossed the finish on just one ski—and the fastest time. Unfortunately, his other leg was broken, and he watched the 1962 World Championships on crutches.

Two years later, at age 20, Killy was entered in all three of the men's events at the 1964 Olympics, because his coach wanted to prepare him for 1968. Unfortunately, Killy was plagued by recurrences of amoebic dysentery and hepatitis, ailments that he had contracted in 1962 during a summer of compulsory service with the French Army in Algeria. His form was definitely off, and he fell a few yards after the start of the downhill, lost a binding in the slalom, and finished fifth in the giant slalom, in which he had been the heavy favorite. Yet a few weeks later, he dominated a giant slalom race at Garmisch-Partenkirchen, in Bavaria, counting for the prestigious Arlberg-Kandahar events, the oldest 'classic' in the sport. A year later, he also triumphed at another major competition, the slalom of the Hahnenkamm races at Kitzbühel that he clinched three times in a row until 1967.

Although the first half of the decade was a relative disappointment, Killy began to strongly improve his results afterwards to become one of the best technical ski racers. In August 1966, the Frenchman, nicknamed 'Toutoune' by some of his colleagues and friends, scored his first win in a downhill race against an international field at the 1966 World Championships in Portillo, Chile, and also took gold in the combined. Killy was peaking as the first World Cup season was launched in January 1967, with the 1968 Winter Olympics in France only a year away.

== Dominance – 1967–68 ==
=== World Cup results ===
==== Season standings ====
Season	Age	Overall	Slalom	Giant Slalom	Super G	Downhill	Combined
1967	23	1	1	1	not run	1	not awarded
1968	24	1	2	1	not run	2	not awarded

==== Season titles ====
- 6 titles – (2 overall, 1 DH, 2 GS, 1 SL)

Season	Discipline
1967	Overall
1967	Downhill
1967	Giant slalom
1967	Slalom
1968	Overall
1968	Giant slalom

==== Race victories ====
- 18 wins – (6 DH, 7 GS, 5 SL)
- 24 podiums – (8 DH, 9 GS, 7 SL)

Season	Date	Location	Discipline
1967	9 Jan 1967	Adelboden, Switzerland	Giant slalom
1967	14 Jan 1967	Wengen, Switzerland	Downhill
1967	15 Jan 1967	Wengen, Switzerland	Slalom
1967	21 Jan 1967	Kitzbühel, Austria	Downhill
1967	22 Jan 1967	Kitzbühel, Austria	Slalom
1967	27 Jan 1967	Megève, France	Downhill
1967	3 Mar 1967	Sestriere, Italy	Downhill
1967	10 Mar 1967	(United States) Franconia, NH, USA	Downhill
1967	11 Mar 1967	(United States) Franconia, NH, USA	Slalom
1967	12 Mar 1967	(United States) Franconia, NH, USA	Giant slalom
1967	19 Mar 1967	(United States) Vail, CO, USA	Giant slalom
1967	25 Mar 1967	(United States) Jackson, WY, USA	Giant slalom
1968	8 Jan 1968	Adelboden, Switzerland	Giant slalom
1968	9 Feb 1968	(France) Grenoble, France; 1968 Winter Olympics ^	Downhill
1968	12 Feb 1968	(France) Grenoble, France; 1968 Winter Olympics ^	Giant slalom
1968	17 Feb 1968	(France) Grenoble, France; 1968 Winter Olympics ^	Slalom
1968	10 Mar 1968	Méribel, France	Giant slalom
1968	29 Mar 1968	Rossland, BC, Canada	Slalom

^ Results from the 1968 Winter Olympics (and 1970 World Championships) were included in the World Cup standings.

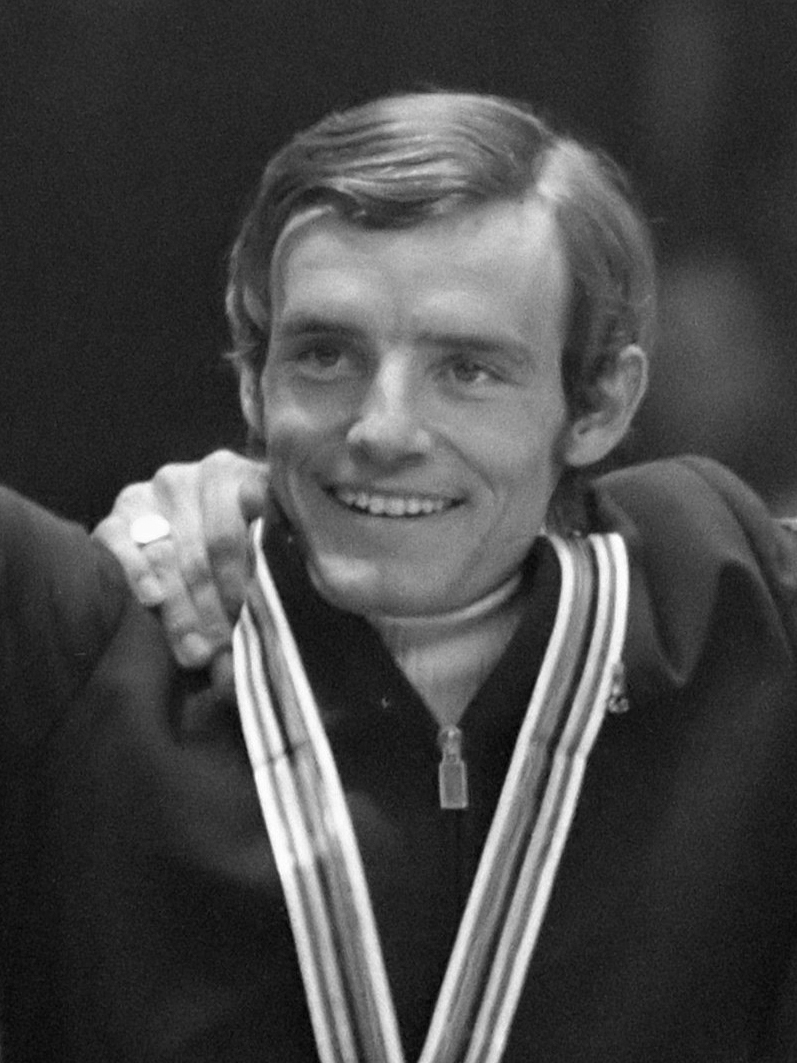
Killy at the 1968 Olympic Games

Killy was the first World Cup champion in 1967, winning 12 of 17 races to easily take the overall title. He also won the season standings in each of the three "classic" alpine disciplines; he won all five of the downhill races and four of the five giant slalom races.

The following year, Killy won the triple crown of alpine skiing with a sweep of all three Olympic gold medals (downhill, giant slalom, and slalom) in controversial circumstances at the 1968 Winter Olympics in Grenoble, France. By finishing first in all races, he also captured the FIS world championship title in the combined event.

Electrical timing by Omega was accurate to one-hundredth of a second. Killy relied on his upper-body strength to hit the bar while already moving forward, giving himself a slight edge. This spectacular start appears to have helped him to beat his teammate Guy Perillat by a few hundredths in the Olympic downhill.

With the Olympic events included (for the only time) in the World Cup standings, Killy easily defended his title in 1968 as the overall champion, placing first in the giant slalom and second in the downhill and slalom season standings. He retired following the 1968 season, and moved to Geneva, Switzerland, in 1969.

== World Championship results ==
Year	Age	Slalom	Giant Slalom	Super-G	Downhill	Combined
1962	18	—	—	not run	—	—
1964	20	DNF1	5	not run	42	—
1966	22	8	5	not run	1	1
1968	24	1	1	not run	1	1

From 1948 through 1980, the Winter Olympics were also the World Championships for alpine skiing.
At the World Championships from 1954 through 1980, the combined was a "paper race" using the results of the three events (DH, GS, SL).

1962: injured

== Olympic results ==
Year	Age	Slalom	Giant Slalom	Super-G	Downhill	Combined
1964	20	DNF1	5	not run	42	not run
1968	24	1	1	not run	1	not run

== Post-Olympic career ==
Killy's success in Grenoble could not have come at a more opportune time for him: the 1968 Winter Olympics were the first to be extensively televised, in color, by the American Broadcasting Company. His all-conquering success, combined with his Gallic flair and looks, made him an overnight celebrity in the United States, especially amongst young women. In May 1968, Killy signed with International Management Group, the sports management firm headed by Mark McCormack. After racing on Dynamic VR17 and Rossignol skis during the part of his career when he was dominant, Killy signed a deal with Head Ski in the fall 1968 to endorse a metal and fiberglass ski named for him, the Killy 800. Head, which was acquired by AMF the following year, manufactured a line of Killy skis for at least two years.

In April 1969, he was awarded the Helms World Trophy.

In television advertisements, Killy promoted the American Express card. He also became a spokesman for Schwinn bicycles, United Airlines, and Chevrolet automobiles; the last, a role detailed by journalist Hunter S. Thompson in his 1970 article "The Temptations of Jean-Claude Killy" for Scanlan's Monthly.

Killy starred as a ski instructor in the 1972 crime movie Snow Job, released in the UK as The Ski Raiders, and US TV as The Great Ski Caper. American children in the early 1970s knew Killy from a TV commercial where he introduces himself, his thick accent making his name into "Chocolate Kitty." Killy played himself in the 1983 movie Copper Mountain: A Club Med Experience, starring Jim Carrey and Alan Thicke, set at Copper Mountain, Colorado. Killy also stars in the noteworthy TV movie Peggy Fleming at Sun Valley (1971), in which he performs some remarkable skiing tricks alongside the three-time ice skating World Champion Peggy Fleming.

Jean-Claude Killy also had a short career as a racing driver between 1967 and 1970, participating in several car races including at Monza. Killy entered the 24 Hours of Le Mans in 1969, partnered with Bob Wollek, another former skier turned racing driver. Killy and Wollek's car led its class for a while before pulling out of the race with only four hours to go. In team with fellow Frenchman Bernard Cahier, Killy was 7th overall in the 1967 Targa Florio in a Porsche 911 S and first in the GT classification.

In November 1972, Killy came out of ski racing retirement at age 29 to compete on the pro circuit in the U.S. for two seasons. After a spirited challenge from two-time defending champion Spider Sabich, Killy won the 1973 season title, taking $28,625 in race winnings and a $40,000 bonus for the championship. He missed the next season, won by Hugo Nindl, due to a recurring stomach ailment, then returned in the fall of 1974. Injuries slowed him and he finished well out of the 1975 standings, won by Hank Kashiwa.

In addition to trying his skill as a car racer, Killy made two television series. One, The Killy Style, was a thirteen-week series that showcased various ski resorts, and the other, The Killy Challenge, featured him racing against celebrities, who were all given handicaps. He was also sponsored by a champagne company, Moët & Chandon, which paid him to be seen with a bottle of their champagne on his table everywhere he went. In 1974 Killy, as part of this sponsorship deal was paid to ski down the previously unskied eastern slope of Mt Ngauruhoe (Peter Jackson's "Mt Doom") in New Zealand. The average slope on this side of the active volcano is 35 degrees. Radar recorded his speed at over 100 mph (160 km/h), and it took two takes, as cloud cover spoiled the first.

In 1975, Killy was hired to lead the new ski operations at Shawnee Mountain Ski Area, a resort in the foothills of the Pocono Mountains in northeastern Pennsylvania. In 1983, Bob Gillen wrote in Ski magazine about the growing reputation of Shawnee Mountain as a ski area. He stated, "Some of the initial interest was stimulated by hiring Jean-Claude Killy to represent the facility, and for several seasons he spent a number of days there. The first time my wife ever skied with me, I saw Killy flash by at Shawnee—he was fast and smooth and he stopped frequently to check the time on his Rolex."

From 1977 to 1994, he was a member of the Executive board of the Alpine Skiing Committee of the FIS. Killy served as co-president of the 1992 Winter Olympics, held in Albertville, France, and as the President of the Société du Tour de France cycling race between 1992 and 2001. From 1995 to 2014, he was a member of the International Olympic Committee and chaired the coordination committee for Turin 2006 and Sochi 2014. He has been an Honorary Member since then.

Killy tried his hand at distance running and competed in the 1983 New York City Marathon, finishing in 3:58:33.

The ski area of Val-d'Isère and Tignes in the French Alps was given the name l'Espace Killy, in his honor.

Killy became Grand Officer of the Légion d'honneur in 2000.

Intrawest credits Killy with the design of a ski trail, "Cupp Run", at their Snowshoe resort in West Virginia.

== Personal life ==
From 1973 to 1987, he was married to French actress Danielle Gaubert, until her death from cancer. Together they had a daughter, Émilie; he also adopted her two children from her first marriage to Rhadamés Trujillo, the son of Rafael Trujillo, the assassinated dictator of the Dominican Republic. Gaubert and Trujillo were divorced in 1968 and later that year she met Killy. He is known for being friends with Russian President Vladimir Putin. In an interview for the 1972 documentary Elvis on Tour, Elvis Presley named Jean-Claude as his favorite skier.

Preceded by Frank King	President of Organizing Committee for Winter Olympic Games; 1992	Succeeded by Gerhard Heiberg
