= Dimitrios Andreadis =

Greek cross-country skier (born 1942)

Personal information
- Nationality: Greek
- Born: 4 February 1942 (age 84) Kastania, Greece

Sport
- Sport: Cross-country skiing

Dimitrios Andreadis (born 4 February 1942) is a Greek cross-country skier. He competed in the men's 15 kilometre and men's 30 kilometre events at the 1968 Winter Olympics.
