= Ross Martin (skier) =

Australian cross-country skier (1943–2011)

Ross Martin (16 May 1943 – 2 July 2011) was an Australian cross-country skier who competed at the 1968 Winter Olympics. He came 60th out of 72 competitors in the 15 km event and 60th out of 63 in the 30 km event.
