= Mehdi Mouidi =

Moroccan alpine skier (born 1940)

Personal information
- Nationality: Moroccan
- Born: 24 October 1940 (age 84); Ait Attab, Morocco

Sport
- Sport: Alpine skiing

Mehdi Mouidi (born 24 October 1940) is a Moroccan alpine skier. He competed in the men's slalom at the 1968 Winter Olympics.
