= Mimoun Ouitot =

Moroccan alpine skier

Personal information
- Nationality: Moroccan

Sport
- Sport: Alpine skiing

Mimoun Ouitot is a Moroccan alpine skier. He competed in the men's giant slalom at the 1968 Winter Olympics.
