= Teresio Vachet =

Italian alpine skier (1947–2025)

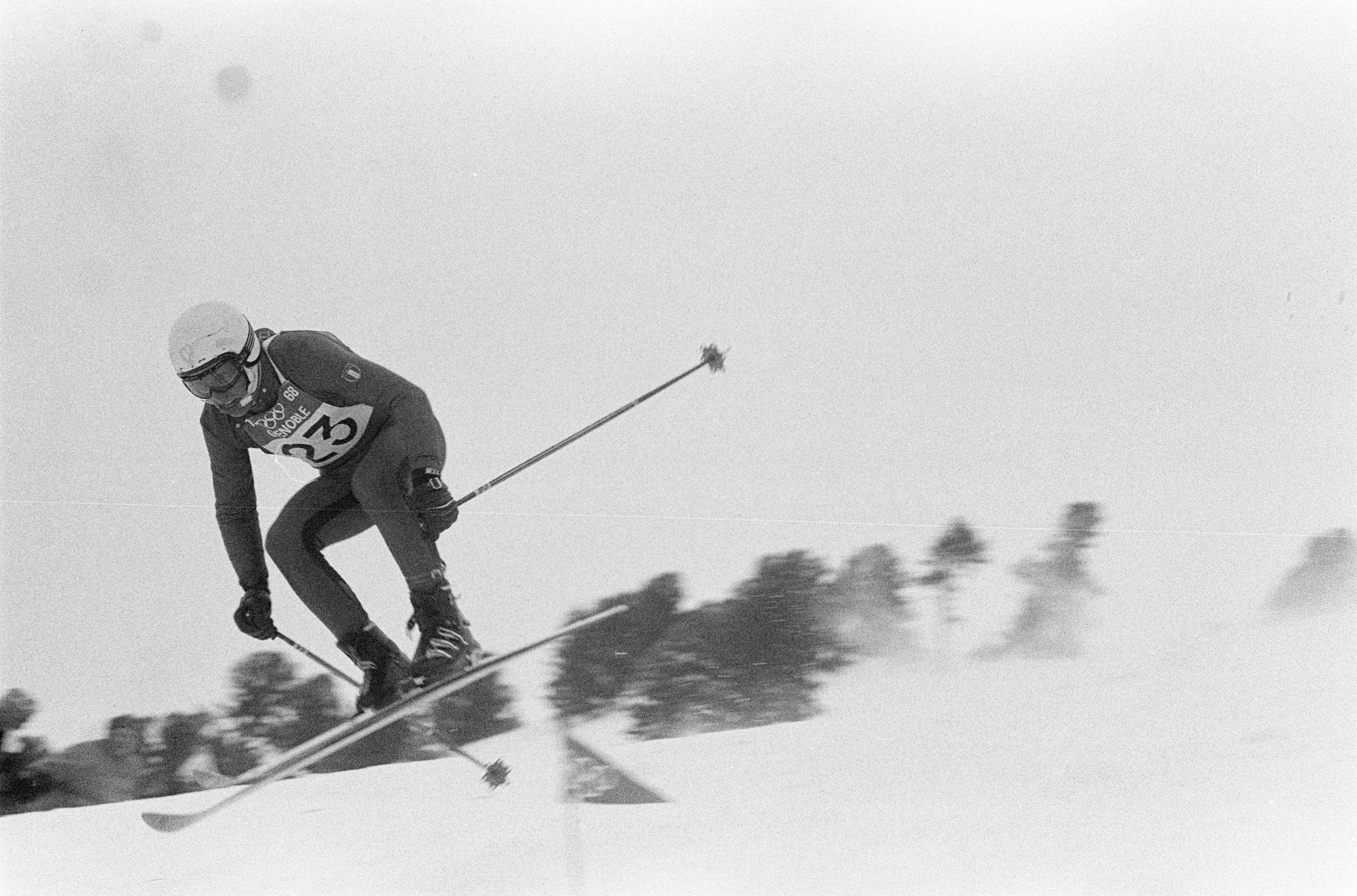

Teresio Vachet (4 February 1947 – 2 July 2025) was an Italian alpine skier who competed in the 1968 Winter Olympics. He was a coach in Italy. Vachet died on 2 July 2025, at the age of 78.
