= Carlos Adsera =

Spanish alpine skier (born 1946)

Personal information
- Full name: Carlos Adsera Puig
- Nationality: Spain
- Born: 6 March 1946 (age 80) Burgos, Spain
- Height: 1.73 m (5 ft 8 in)
- Weight: 72 kg (159 lb)

Sport
- Sport: Alpine skiing

Carlos Adsera (born 6 March 1946) is a Spanish alpine skier. He competed in the 1968 Winter Olympics.
