= Peter Duncan (alpine skier) =

Canadian former alpine skier

Personal information
- Born: 25 July 1944 (age 81) Sherbrooke, Quebec, Canada

Skiing career
- Sport: Alpine skiing ♂
- Disciplines: downhill, giant slalom, slalom

Olympics
- Teams: 2
- Updated on 25 November 2019

Peter Duncan (born 25 July 1944) is a Canadian former alpine skier who competed in the 1964 Winter Olympics and 1968 Winter Olympics.

Duncan was a member of the Canadian National Alpine Team from 1960 to 1970.

Duncan represented Canada at the 1964 Winter Olympics in Innsbruck, Austria competing in all off the men's alpine skiing events. In the downhill competition, he placed 34th with a time of 2:30.06 (+11.90). He finished in 19th place in the men's slalom with a total time of 2:19.10 (+7.97). In the men's giant slalom, he finished in 26th place with a time of 1:58.44 (+11.73).

Duncan competed in the following Winter Olympics in 1968, again competing in all the men's alpine events. In the men's downhill, he was disqualified. In the men's giant slalom, he had combined time of 3:38.17 (+8.89) putting him in 18th place. In the men's slalom he was unable to advance to the final round.

When he retired from the national team, he was presented with the John Semmelink Memorial Award for his sportsmanship and conduct in representing Canada.

== Personal life ==
Duncan was born in Sherbrooke, Quebec, Canada on 25 July 1944. He grew up in Mont-Tremblant at the ski resort where his father was the operations manager. He is married to Louise-Josée Mondoux, a TVA television host and lives in Arundel, Quebec.

Duncan was a torch bearer in the torch relay for the 2010 Winter Olympics.
