= Luciano del Cacho =

Spanish alpine skier (born 1947)

Personal information
- Nationality: Spanish
- Born: 18 September 1947 (age 77); Sallent de Gállego, Spain

Sport
- Sport: Alpine skiing

Luciano del Cacho (born 18 September 1947) is a Spanish alpine skier. He competed in the men's downhill at the 1968 Winter Olympics.
