= Lasse Hamre =

Norwegian alpine skier (born 1944)

Personal information
- Born: 26 December 1944 (age 80); Trondheim, Norway

Sport
- Sport: Alpine skiing

Lars Arne «Lasse» Hamre (born 26 December 1944) is a Norwegian alpine skier. He was born in Trondheim. He participated at the 1968 Winter Olympics in Grenoble, where he competed in downhill and slalom.

He became Norwegian champion in slalom in 1969 and 1971, and in alpine combined in 1969.
