= Nagib Barrak =

Lebanese alpine skier (born 1940)

Personal information
- Nationality: Lebanese
- Born: 1940 (age 84–85); Chlifa, Lebanon

Sport
- Sport: Alpine skiing

Nagib Barrak (born 1940) is a Lebanese alpine skier. He competed in two events at the 1968 Winter Olympics.
