= Moussa Jaalouk =

Lebanese alpine skier (born 1940)

Personal information
- Nationality: Lebanese
- Born: 18 October 1940 (age 84); Andamit, Lebanon

Sport
- Sport: Alpine skiing

Moussa Jaalouk (born 18 October 1940) is a Lebanese alpine skier. He competed in two events at the 1968 Winter Olympics.
