= Renato Valentini =

Italian alpine skier (1946–2016)

Renato Valentini (24 October 1946 – 2 June 2016) was an Italian alpine skier who competed in the 1968 Winter Olympics.
