= Tomio Sasaki =

Japanese alpine skier (born 1945)

Personal information
- Nationality: Japanese
- Born: 16 November 1945 (age 79); Hokkaido, Japan

Sport
- Sport: Alpine skiing

Tomio Sasaki (佐々木 富雄, Sasaki Tomio, born 16 November 1945) is a Japanese alpine skier. He competed in two events at the 1968 Winter Olympics.
