= Per-Olov Richardsson =

Swedish alpine skier (born 1942)

Per-Olov Richardsson (born 17 January 1942 in Undersåker) is a Swedish former alpine skier who competed in the 1968 Winter Olympics, finishing 43rd in the men's downhill.

Per-Olov is the father of Karin Richardsson, Richard Richardsson and Olov Richardsson. He also has four grandchildren, Mimmi, Ylva, Oskar and Erik Richardsson.
