= Said Housni =

Moroccan skier (born 1949)

Personal information
- Nationality: Moroccan
- Born: 1949 (age 75–76) Azrou, Morocco

Sport
- Sport: Alpine skiing

Said Housni (born 1949) is a Moroccan alpine ski racer who competed in the technical events of giant slalom and slalom at the 1968 Winter Olympics in France. In the giant slalom, Housni finished in 83rd place, and did not advance out of the slalom qualifying round.

Earlier at those Olympics, eighteen-year-old American Karen Budge was testing her wax on a practice course an hour before the women's downhill at Chamrousse, and narrowly avoided a full collision with Housni, who had been warned once before to stay off the hill. She fell, suffered a dislocated shoulder, and did not start.
