= Eo Jae-sik =

South Korean alpine skier (born 1948)

Personal information
- Nationality: South Korean
- Born: 30 May 1948 (age 76); Gangwon, South Korea

Sport
- Sport: Alpine skiing

Eo Jae-sik (born 30 May 1948) is a South Korean alpine skier. He competed in two events at the 1968 Winter Olympics.
