= Greece at the 1968 Winter Olympics =

- IOC code: GRE
- NOC: Committee of the Olympic Games

in Grenoble France
- Competitors: 3 (men) in 2 sports
- Flag bearer: Dimitrios Pappos
- Medals: Gold 0 Silver 0 Bronze 0 Total 0

Winter Olympics appearances (overview)
- 1936; 1948; 1952; 1956; 1960; 1964; 1968; 1972; 1976; 1980; 1984; 1988; 1992; 1994; 1998; 2002; 2006; 2010; 2014; 2018; 2022; 2026

Greece competed at the 1968 Winter Olympics in Grenoble, France.

== Alpine skiing ==
Men

Athlete	Event	Race 1		Race 2		Total	
Athlete	Event	Time	Rank	Time	Rank	Time	Rank
Dimitrios Pappos	Downhill					2:44.10	72
Athanasios Tsimikalis	Downhill					2:36.93	70
Dimitrios Pappos	Giant Slalom	2:16.22	84	2:15.86	79	4:32.08	79
Athanasios Tsimikalis	Giant Slalom	2:14.10	81	2:10.98	77	4:25.08	78

Men's slalom

Athlete	Heat 1		Heat 2		Final					
Athlete	Time	Rank	Time	Rank	Time 1	Rank	Time 2	Rank	Total	Rank
Dimitrios Pappos	1:10.88	5	1:26.48	3	did not advance					
Athanasios Tsimikalis	1:02.82	2 QF	–	–	DNF	–	–	–	DNF	–

== Cross-country skiing ==
Men

Event	Athlete	Race	
Event	Athlete	Time	Rank
15 km	Dimitrios Andreadis	1'00:52.1	68
30 km	Dimitrios Andreadis	DNF	–

== Sources ==
- Official Olympic Reports
- Olympic Winter Games 1968, full results by sports-reference.com
