= Bruno Piazzalunga =

Italian alpine skier (born 1944)

Bruno Piazzalunga (born 25 October 1944 in Chiomonte) is an Italian retired alpine skier who competed in the 1968 Winter Olympics.
