= Max Rieger (skier) =

German alpine skier (born 1946)

Max Rieger (born 10 July 1946 in Mittenwald) is a German former alpine skier who competed in the 1968 Winter Olympics and 1972 Winter Olympics.
