= Mohamed Aomar =

Moroccan alpine skier

Personal information
- Nationality: Moroccan
- Born: 1936 (age 89–90) Imlil, Marrakesh-Safi, Morocco

Sport
- Sport: Alpine skiing

Mohamed Aomar Ait ifraden omar (born 1936) is a Moroccan alpine skier. He competed in two events at the 1968 Winter Olympics. décédé le 30 juillet 2024

l'un des anciens skieurs qui ont représenté le Maroc aux JO d’hiver de Grenoble 1968
