= Ivar Sigmundsson =

Icelandic alpine skier (born 1942)

Personal information
- Nationality: Icelandic
- Born: 5 May 1942 (age 82); Akureyri, Iceland

Sport
- Sport: Alpine skiing

Ivar Sigmundsson (born 5 May 1942) is an Icelandic alpine skier. He competed in two events at the 1968 Winter Olympics.
