= Kristinn Benediktsson =

Icelandic alpine skier (born 1939)

Personal information
- Nationality: Icelandic
- Born: 5 May 1939 (age 87) Ísafjörður, Iceland

Sport
- Sport: Alpine skiing

Kristinn Benediktsson (born 5 May 1939) is an Icelandic alpine skier. He competed at the 1960, 1964 and the 1968 Winter Olympics.
