= Julian Vasey =

British alpine skier (1950–1979)

Julian Vasey (26 April 1950 – 27 May 1979) was a British alpine skier who competed in the 1968 Winter Olympics.
