= Hassan Lahmaoui =

Moroccan alpine skier (born 1947)

Personal information
- Nationality: Moroccan
- Born: 1947 (age 77–78); Ait Attab, Morocco

Sport
- Sport: Alpine skiing

Hassan Lahmaoui (born 1947) is a Moroccan alpine skier. He competed in two events at the 1968 Winter Olympics.
