= Andrey Belokrinkin =

Soviet alpine skier (born 1946)

Personal information
- Nationality: Soviet
- Born: 26 November 1946 (age 79) Nizhny Novgorod, Russian SFSR, Soviet Union

Sport
- Sport: Alpine skiing

Andrey Belokrinkin (born 26 November 1946) is a Soviet alpine skier. He competed in three events at the 1968 Winter Olympics.
