= Wolfgang Ender =

Liechtenstein alpine skier (born 1946)

Wolfgang Ender (born 8 October 1946) is a Liechtensteiner former alpine skier who competed in the 1968 Winter Olympics.

Ender crashed during training days before the 1964 Winter Olympics, the crash occurred only minutes after the death of Australian athlete Ross Milne.
