= Gustavo Ezquerra =

Argentine alpine skier (born 1948)

Personal information
- Born: 28 November 1948 (age 76); San Carlos de Bariloche, Argentina

Sport
- Sport: Alpine skiing

Gustavo Ezquerra (born 28 November 1948) is an Argentine alpine skier. He competed in three events at the 1968 Winter Olympics.
