= Antonio Campaña =

Spanish alpine skier (born 1946)

Personal information
- Nationality: Spanish
- Born: 24 May 1946 (age 78); Barcelona, Spain

Sport
- Sport: Alpine skiing

Antonio Campaña (born 24 May 1946) is a Spanish alpine skier. He competed in two events at the 1968 Winter Olympics.
