= Björn Olsen (skier) =

Icelandic alpine skier (born 1946)

Personal information
- Born: 8 April 1946 (age 80) Siglufjörður, Iceland

Sport
- Sport: Alpine skiing, Rallying

Björn Olsen (born 8 April 1946) is an Icelandic former alpine skier and rally co-driver. He competed in two skiing events at the 1968 Winter Olympics.

In the 1980's, he competed in rally in Iceland as a co-driver.
