= Viktor Belyakov =

Soviet alpine skier (born 1946)

Personal information
- Nationality: Soviet
- Born: 4 August 1946 (age 78); Moscow, Russian SFSR, Soviet Union

Sport
- Sport: Alpine skiing

Viktor Belyakov (born 4 August 1946) is a Soviet alpine skier. He competed in three events at the 1968 Winter Olympics.
