= Willi Lesch =

German alpine skier (born 1942)

Willi Lesch (born 11 December 1942 in Munich) is a German former alpine skier who competed in the 1968 Winter Olympics and 1972 Winter Olympics. Competitions include Men's Downhill, Men's Giant Slalom, and Men's Slalom.
