= Ali Saveh-Shemshaki =

Iranian alpine skier (born 1949)

Personal information
- Nationality: Iranian
- Born: 1949 (age 75–76); Tehran, Iran

Sport
- Sport: Alpine skiing

Ali Saveh-Shemshaki (Persian: علی ساوه شمشكی, born 1949) is an Iranian alpine skier. He competed at the 1968 Winter Olympics and the 1972 Winter Olympics.
