= Reynir Brynjólfsson =

Icelandic alpine skier (born 1945)

Personal information
- Nationality: Icelandic
- Born: 7 February 1945 (age 80); Akureyri, Iceland

Sport
- Sport: Alpine skiing

Reynir Brynjólfsson (born 7 February 1945) is an Icelandic alpine skier. He competed in two events at the 1968 Winter Olympics.
