= Richard Leatherbee =

Chilean alpine skier (born 1949)

Personal information
- Born: 8 April 1949 (age 77) Santiago, Chile

Sport
- Sport: Alpine skiing

Richard Leatherbee (born 8 April 1949) is a Chilean alpine skier. He competed in three events at the 1968 Winter Olympics.
