= Milan Pažout =

Slovak skier (born 1948)

Personal information
- Nationality: Slovak
- Born: 8 June 1948 (age 78) Krompachy, Czechoslovakia

Sport
- Sport: Alpine skiing

Milan Pažout (born 8 June 1948) is a Slovak alpine skier. He competed in three events at the 1968 Winter Olympics.
