= Jon Terje Øverland =

Norwegian alpine skier (born 1944)

Personal information
- Nationality: Norwegian
- Born: 14 December 1944 (age 80); Rjukan, Norway

Sport
- Sport: Alpine skiing

Jon Terje Øverland (born 14 December 1944) is a Norwegian alpine skier. He was born in Rjukan. He participated at the 1964 Winter Olympics in Innsbruck, where he competed in downhill, slalom and giant slalom. He also participated at the 1968 Winter Olympics in Grenoble.

He was Norwegian champion in downhill in 1968, 1969 and 1970.
