= Jaroslav Janda =

Czech alpine skier (born 1942)

Personal information
- Nationality: Czech
- Born: 17 October 1942 (age 84) Gablonz an der Neiße, Reichsgau Sudetenland, Germany

Sport
- Sport: Alpine skiing

Jaroslav Janda (born 17 October 1942) is a Czech alpine skier. He competed in three events at the 1968 Winter Olympics.
