= Robert Palmer (skier) =

New Zealand alpine skier (born 1947)

Robert Palmer (born 1947) is an alpine skier from New Zealand.

In the 1968 Winter Olympics at Grenoble, he came 42nd in the Downhill but did not finish in the Giant Slalom.
