= Luke O'Reilly (alpine skier) =

British alpine skier (born 1948)

Luke O'Reilly (21 June 1948 – 21 June 2017) was a British alpine skier who competed in the 1968 Winter Olympics. He was born in Liverpool.
