= Murray Gardner (skier) =

New Zealand alpine skier (born 1946)

Murray Gardner (born 1946) is an alpine skier from New Zealand.

In the 1968 Winter Olympics at Grenoble, he came 76th in the Giant Slalom, but did not qualify in the Downhill.
