= Félipe Briones =

Chilean alpine skier (born 1950)

Personal information
- Born: 17 November 1950 (age 75) Santiago, Chile

Sport
- Sport: Alpine skiing

Félipe Briones (born 17 November 1950) is a Chilean alpine skier. He competed in three events at the 1968 Winter Olympics.
