= Ryszard Ćwikła =

Polish alpine skier (1946–1992)

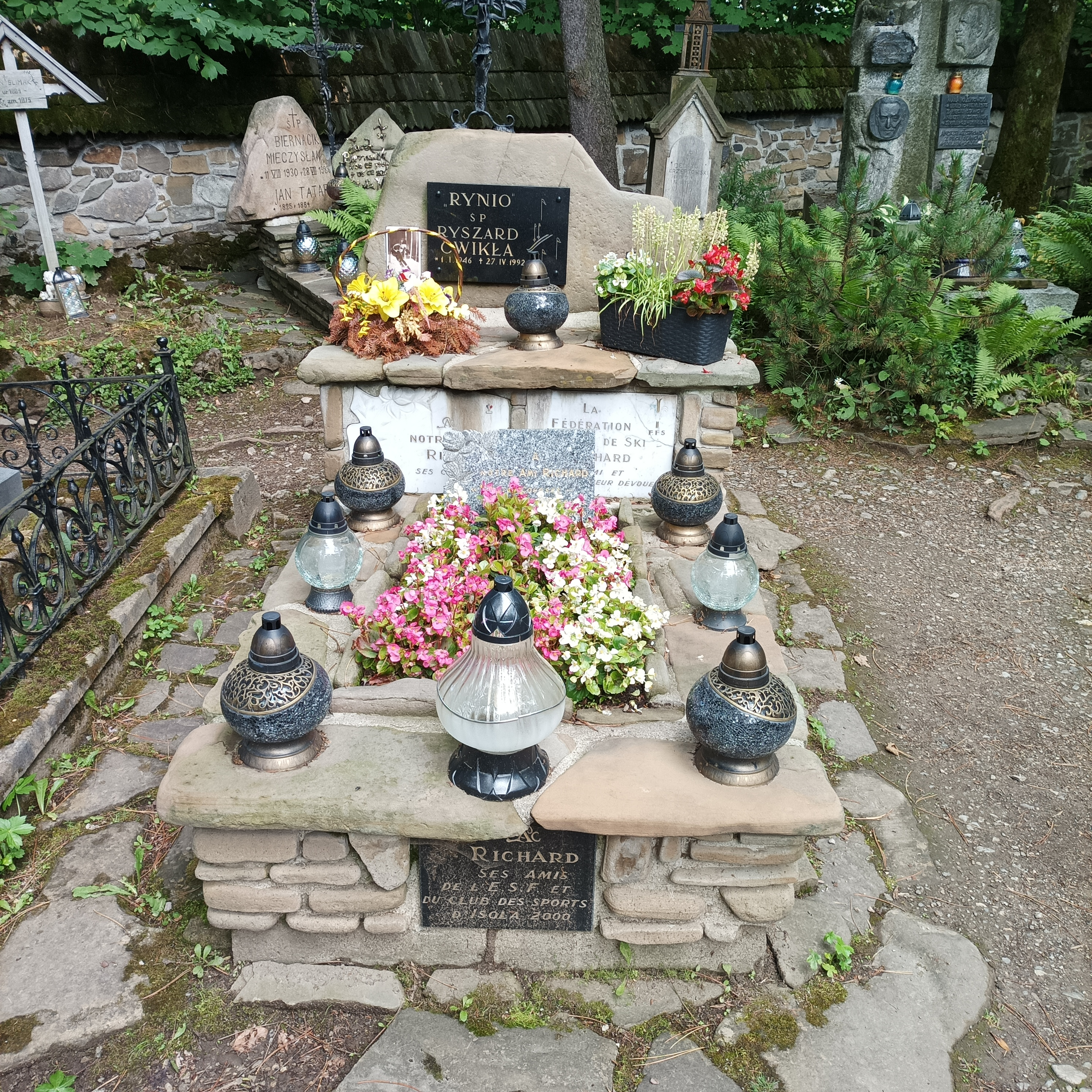
Grave of Ryszarda Ćwikła

Ryszard Julian Ćwikła (1 January 1946 – 27 April 1992) was a Polish alpine skier who competed in the 1968 Winter Olympics. He became a trainer of the French skiing team. He was born in Zakopane and died in Nice.
