= Athanasios Tsimikalis =

Greek alpine skier (born 1946)

Personal information
- Nationality: Greek
- Born: 27 October 1946 (age 80) Athens, Greece

Sport
- Sport: Alpine skiing

Athanasios Tsimikalis (born 27 October 1946) is a Greek alpine skier. He competed in three events at the 1968 Winter Olympics.
