= 1968 Winter Olympics =

Multi-sport event in Grenoble, France

X Olympic Winter Games
- Emblem of the 1968 Winter Olympics (Note: The emblem represents a snow crystal and three red roses, the symbol of Grenoble, and the Olympic rings.)
- Location: Grenoble, France
- Nations: 37
- Athletes: 1,163 (952 men, 211 women)
- Events: 35 in 6 sports (10 disciplines)
- Opening: 6 February 1968
- Closing: 18 February 1968
- Opened by: President Charles de Gaulle
- Cauldron: Alain Calmat
- Stadium: Olympic Stadium

The 1968 Winter Olympics, officially known as the X Olympic Winter Games (French: Les Xes Jeux olympiques d'hiver), were a winter multi-sport event held from 6 to 18 February 1968 in Grenoble, France. Thirty-seven countries participated.

The 1968 Winter Games marked the first time the IOC permitted East and West Germany to enter separately, and the first time the IOC ordered drug and gender testing of competitors.

Norway won the most gold and overall medals, the first time since the 1952 Winter Olympics that the Soviet Union did not top the medal table by both parameters.

== Host city selection ==
On 24 November 1960, François Raoul, the prefect of the Isère Département, and Raoul Arduin, the president of the Dauphiné Ski Federation, officially presented the idea of hosting the 1968 Winter Olympic Games in Grenoble. After the city council agreed in principle, different government agencies offered their support, and the villages around Grenoble also reacted positively, an application committee was formed and led by Albert Michallon, the former mayor of Grenoble on 30 December 1960. The application was officially given to the IOC during a meeting between IOC executives and representatives of international sport agencies in Lausanne in February 1963.

1968 Winter Olympics bidding results
City	Country	Round		
City	Country	1	2	3
Grenoble	France	15	18	27
Calgary	Canada	12	19	24
Lahti	Finland	11	14	—
Sapporo	Japan	6	—	—
Oslo	Norway	4	—	—
Lake Placid	United States	3	—	—

In the application, the decision was not solely based on sport, because there had only been two important sport events in the Isère Département: the Bobsleigh World Championships of 1951 in L'Alpe d'Huez and the Luge World Championships of 1959 in Villard-de-Lans. Between 1946 and 1962, the number of inhabitants in Grenoble increased from 102,000 to 159,000, and the total inhabitants in the Département Isère increased from 139,000 to 250,000. The development of the infrastructure could not keep up with this rapid increase, and was, for the most part, at the same level as before World War II. The people who were responsible never made a secret out of it that it was mainly for them about using the Olympic Games to receive larger grants to quickly develop dated infrastructure and support the local economy.

The 61st IOC session, where the awarding of the Olympic Games would have been voted for, would have taken place in Nairobi, Kenya. This session was moved to Baden-Baden, West Germany, because Kenya refused entry to IOC members from Portugal and apartheid South Africa for political reasons. Due to a lack of time, only the 1968 Summer Olympics host city could be voted for. The vote finally took place in Innsbruck on 28 January 1964, a day before the start of the 1964 Winter Olympics. 51 members who were eligible to vote were in attendance and Grenoble were awarded the games after the third round of voting and were competing against Calgary, who were awarded the Games 20 years later.

== Organisation ==
Official poster for the 1968 Winter Olympics

After Grenoble was voted as the host city, the French National Olympic Sports Committee decided the foundation of the organisation committee. The Comité d'Organisation des dixièmes Jeux Olympiques (COJO), the committee for the organisation of the 10th Olympic Winter Games, started to plan the games for the first time on 1 August 1964. Albert Michallon, alongside being the former mayor of Grenoble, was also president of COJO. The upper panel was made up of the general assembly with its 340 members and the supervisory board conduct business with 39 members, 19 of which were appointed and the other 20 were voted for. The general secretary consisted of five main departments and 17 subordinate departments. The number of employees grew to 1920 in February 1968.

The French government played a major role in the preparations for the Games, as president Charles de Gaulle saw an opportunity to present Grenoble as a symbol for a modern France. François Missoffe, Minister for Youth and Sport, formed an interministerial committee for the coordination of the work commissioned by prime minister Georges Pompidou. Over 7000 soldiers of the French armed forces and also employees of the ministries for Youth and Sport, Finance, Social Building, Education, Post, Culture and Transport were employed. The sum of the investments contributed to CNF$1.1 billion Francs (roughly 775 million pounds). The government contributed 47.08%, the Isere Department 3.65%, the city of Grenoble 20.07% and the surrounding communities 1.37%. Different institutions, such as the national train company SNCF; the television broadcaster ORTF; the government housing association and the regional association of hospitals provided the rest of the money.

These means were used accordingly; 465.181 million Francs for the infrastructure of transport and communications, 250.876 million for the Olympic village and press area, 92.517 million for the sports arenas, 57.502 million for television and radio, 45.674 million for culture, 95.116 million for the city's infrastructure and 90.429 million for the running of COJO. They built a new airport, two motorway sections of 7.5 miles and 15 miles, a switchboard, a new town hall, a new police station, a fire station, a hospital with 560 beds, a congress and exhibition centre and a culture palace. They upgraded the access road to the outer sport arenas, an orbital road round Grenoble as well as relocating the rail tracks and removing the level crossings and building a completely new main train station.

To test the new sport complex and to improve organisational processes, they organized "International Sports Weeks". Speed skating competitions and ski races took place from 20 January to 19 February 1967; an ice hockey tournament from 12 to 15 October; and a figure-skating competition from 23 to 25 November.

== Torch relay ==
On 16 December 1967, the Olympic torch was lit in Olympia, Greece. The ceremony would have taken place on 13 December, but was postponed due to the attempted coup d'état of King Constantine II, who had been forced from his throne eight months before, against the dictatorial military regime of Georgios Papadopoulos. From there, the flame was run to the Old Olympic Stadium in Athens the torch was flown by an Air France Boeing 707 to the Orly International Airport, where the torch was received by Jean Vuarnet, the 1960 Winter Olympics Downhill Olympic gold medalist, on 19 December, who handed it on to the first torchbearer Alain Mimoun, the 1956 Summer Olympics Marathon Olympic gold medalist.

The torch relay in France went over a distance of 7,222 kilometers through 41 districts and 170 towns to the Isère district. 5,000 torchbearers, who transported the torch on foot, by bike, by boat, by skis or by motorbike, took part in the relay. The first part of the relay was made at the old port of Marseille was done by a diver who, while swimming, held the torch just over the surface of the water. The torchbearers were accompanied by around 80,000 athletes and watched by an audience of about two million people. The last stop on the day before the opening ceremony was Saint-Pierre-de-Chartreuse. From there, the torch was carried to Grenoble.

The 33 torches that were used in the relay were produced by the Société technique d'équipement, a subsidiary of the Compagnie de Saint-Gobain. They were 70 cm tall, weighed 1750 g, were made of copper and had a propane gas tank. The reserve flames (a cautionary measure in case the torch went out) burned in twenty carbide lamps, the same as the Olympic fire when it was transported from Athens to Paris in a plane.

== Visual identity ==
Shuss, the "unofficial" mascot of the 1968 Winter Olympic games

The logo for the 1968 Winter Olympic Games portrays a floating snow crystal surrounded by three stylised roses on top of the single-coloured (in white) Olympic rings. The roses can be found in the same pattern (two on the top and one below) as Grenoble's emblem.

For the first time, there was an Olympic mascot, although it was unofficial. The mascot was named Schuss, a stylised skier wearing a blue skiing costume and a large red ball as a head. The mascot designed by Aline Lafargue was hardly recognised publicly. It had unofficial character, was marked with great restraint and appeared solely on pins and several toys.

Jack Lesage, a videomaker who specialised in mountain and winter sport recordings, filmed two Olympic advertisements of 15–18 minutes in length before the Olympic Games took place and was contracted by the Organisation Committee. "Trois roses, cinq anneaux" ("Three roses, five rings") emerged in 1966, and showed Grenoble, as well as the surrounding venues, in the early stage of preparation. In 1967, "Vaincre à Grenoble" ("Victory in Grenoble") emerged, and documented the progress of the workers, complemented with images of the sport competitions. Both films appeared in three different versions with French, English and German commentary. In France, the films were shown in cinemas before particular feature films, abroad for receptions and presentations.

The French post office issued six Olympic-themed postage stamps. On 22 April 1967, a label next appeared worth 0.60 francs with the official logo as its motif. On 27 January 1968, ten days before the opening ceremony, a series of five semi-postal stamps followed. The designs were ski jumpers and skiers (0.30++ 0,10 F), ice hockey players (0.40 + 0,10 F), the olympic torch (0.60 + 0.20 F), a female ice skater (0.75 + 0.25 F) and slalom racers (0.95 + 0.35 F). The proceeds from the supplement stamps were split between the French Red Cross and the Organisation Committee.

== Highlights and controversies ==
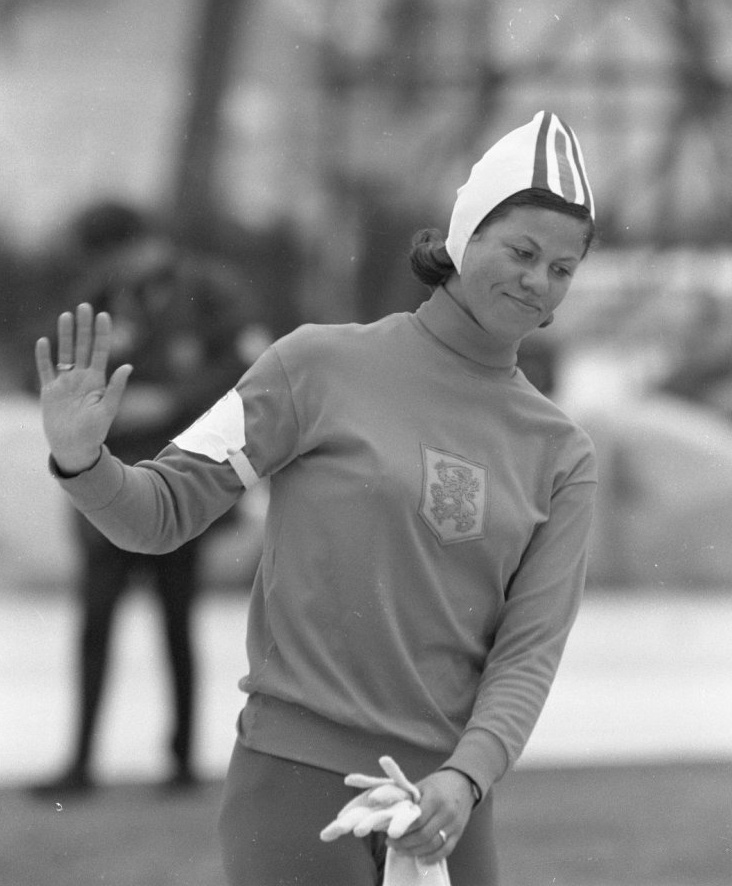
Ans Schut after setting an Olympic record on 3000 m in 1968

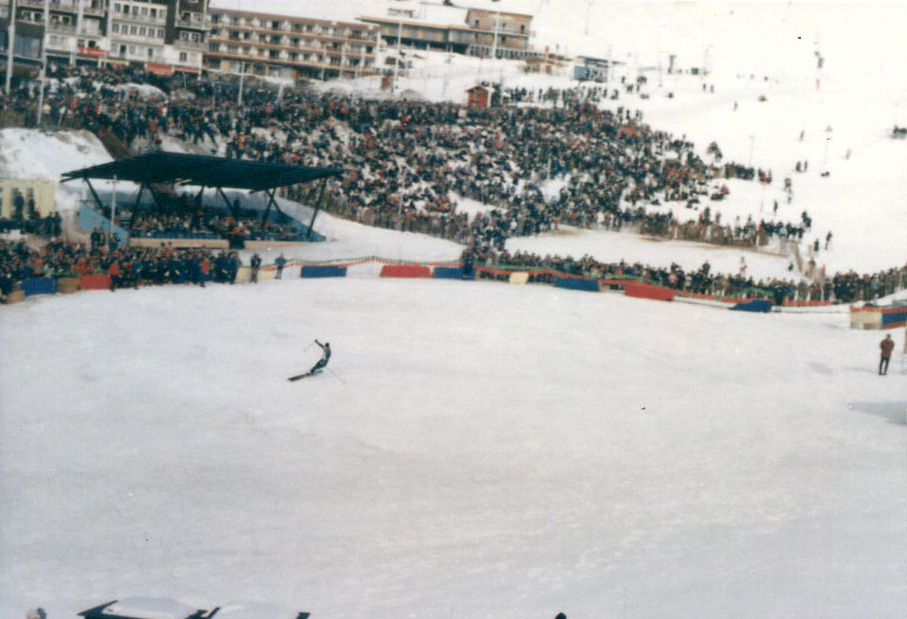
Arrival of Jean-Claude Killy

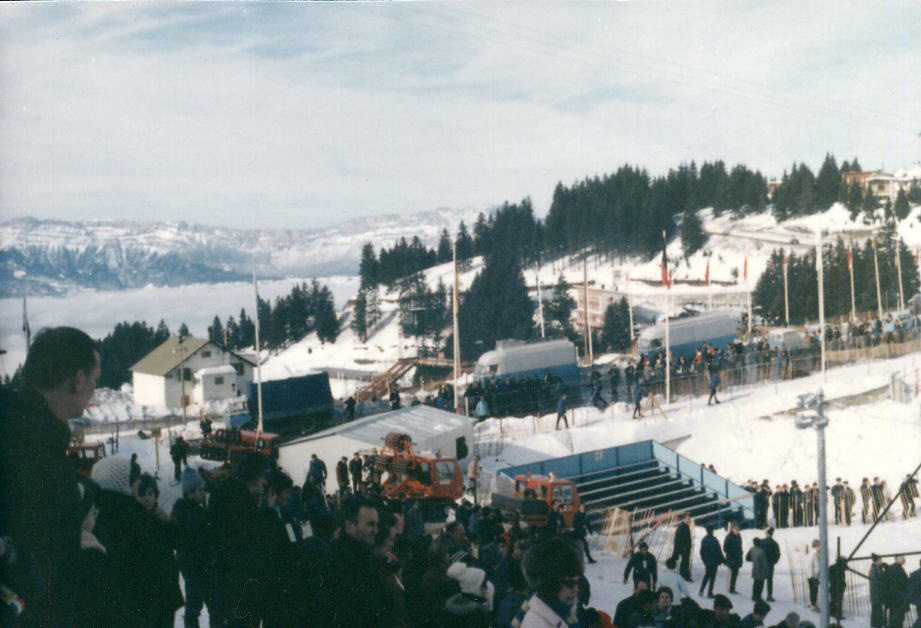
Site of Chamrousse (1968)

- These were the first Winter Olympics on which doping control tests were performed.
- Norway won the most medals, 6 gold, 6 silver, and 2 bronze, the first time a country other than the Soviet Union had done so since the USSR first entered the Winter Games in 1956.
- In the downhill alpine skiing event, the French Jean-Claude Killy navigated the track with a time of 1:59.85 and won the gold medal.
- Killy also swept the other men's alpine events, winning three gold medals overall, but only after one of the greatest controversies in the history of the Winter Olympics. Austrian superstar Karl Schranz claimed that a mysterious man dressed in black crossed his path during the slalom race, causing him to skid to a halt. Given a restart, Schranz beat Killy's time. However, a Jury of Appeal disqualified Schranz and gave the medal to Killy.
- In women's luge, there were three East German (GDR) racers Ortrun Enderlein, Anna-Maria Müller, and Angela Knösel in the top 4 after three runs, but they were disqualified when the International Luge Federation (FIL) determined that they had been heating their runners, a banned practice. Italian Erika Lechner, third after three runs, was moved into first place, and won gold after the fourth run was cancelled due to bad weather. West German media alleged race fixing, while the GDR sports officials blamed the West German Luge Association for staging the incident. According to Stasi documents which came to light in 2006, the FIL official who made the decision had allegedly been bribed by the Federal Republic of Germany and Austria to make the allegation. The question of whether the GDR lugers really cheated remains unresolved, with some contemporary media in Germany maintaining that the GDR team were unfairly disqualified.
- Swedish skier Toini Gustafsson was a star in women's cross-country events, winning both individual races and earning a silver medal in the relay.
- American figure skater Peggy Fleming built up a huge lead after the compulsory figures and won the first-place votes of all nine judges. Her victory marked the first gold medal won by an American after the 1961 Sabena Flight 548 incident when the entire US figure skating team died, and heralded an American figure skating renaissance.
- Lyudmila Belousova and Oleg Protopopov successfully defended their pairs figure skating title from Innsbruck for the Soviet Union.
- The Italian bobsleigh pilot Eugenio Monti drove both the two-man and four-man events to win gold. All bobsleigh contests had to be scheduled to start before sunrise and end shortly after dawn because the track at L'Alpe d'Huez was designed with insufficient cooling capability and could not keep the ice solid in bright daylight.
- In speed skating, the women's 3,000-metre event turned out to be particularly fast, with the first 10 finishers beating the previous Olympic record set in 1960 Winter Olympics. However, the gold medallist, the Netherlands' Johanna Schut, was unable to beat the world record—until the next year on the same oval in Grenoble.
- The 1968 Winter Olympics were the first to use "Bugler's Dream" by Leo Arnaud as the theme for Olympic television coverage on ABC. It was also the first Olympics to be broadcast in color.
- Italian cross-country skier Franco Nones became the first athlete not from Norway, Sweden, Finland, or the Soviet Union to win an Olympic medal in cross-country skiing.

== Venues ==
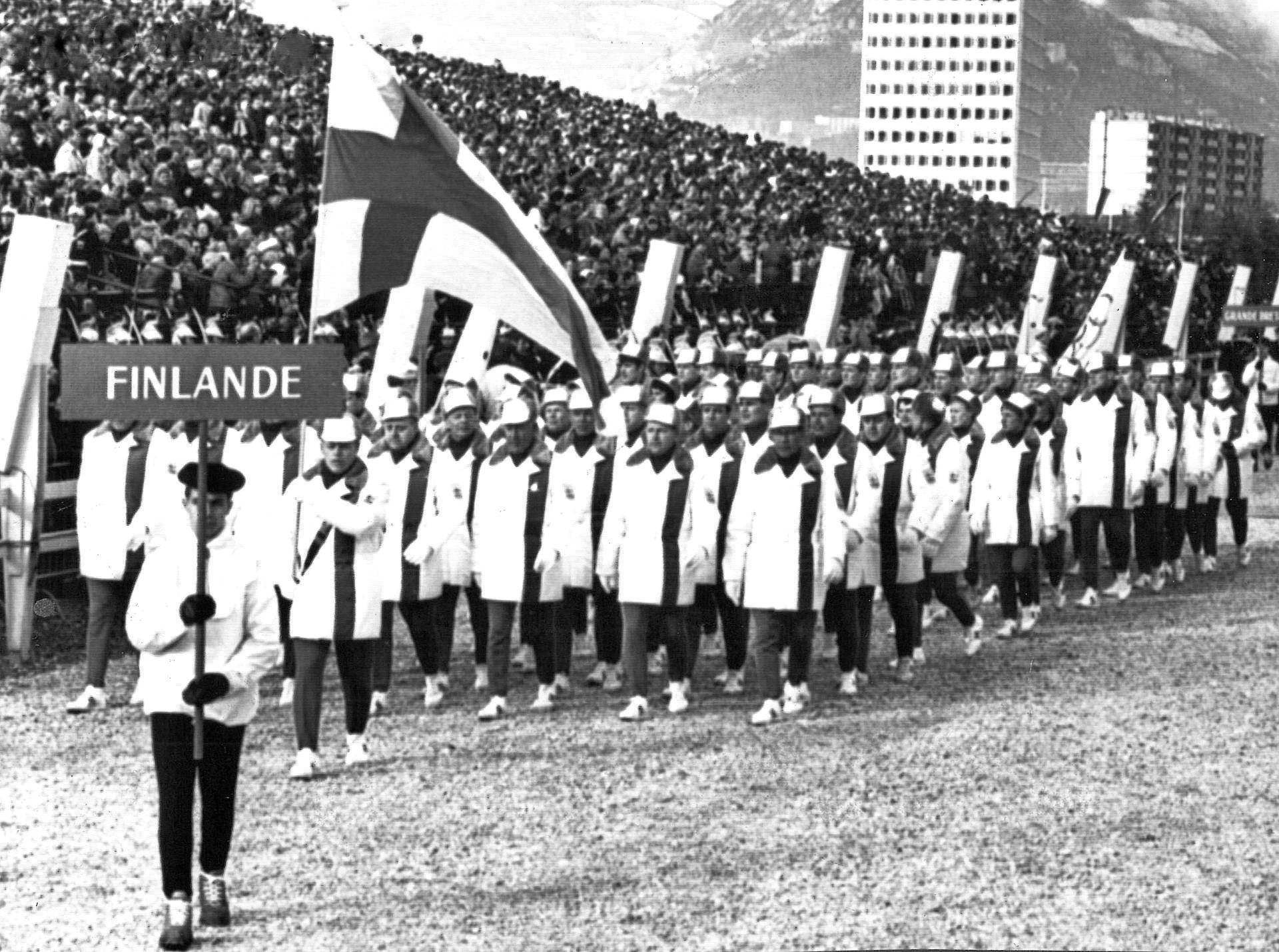
Finnish Olympic team on the opening day

- Autrans – biathlon, cross-country skiing, Nordic combined, ski jumping (normal hill)
- Chamrousse – alpine skiing (men)
- L'Anneau de Vitesse in Paul Mistral Park – speed skating
- Le Stade de Glace in Paul Mistral Park – figure skating, ice hockey, medal and closing ceremonies
- Piste de Bobsleigh – bobsleigh
- Piste de Luge – luge
- Recoin de Chamrousse – alpine skiing (women)
- Saint-Nizier-du-Moucherotte – ski jumping (large hill)
- Olympic Stadium (Grenoble) – opening ceremonies

There were five other venues surrounding Grenoble used as sporting venues for the Winter Olympic Games in 1968. For the first time in history, the venues were divided into four clusters. Grenoble set a new trend by having venues in different parts of the surrounding areas. Compared to the investments for the infrastructure, the investments for building sports arenas was very small. This investment only contributed nine percent.

Almost half of this investment, 46 million Francs, was used to build the new ice rink Stade de glace (now Palais des Sports), the venue where the main ice hockey matches, the figure skating competition and the closing ceremony were held. The arena has 12,000 seats and is situated in Parc Paul Mistral, Grenoble's main public park located in the center of the city. The architects were Robert Demartini and Pierre Junillon. Construction began in mid-November 1965 and finished in October 1967. The roof was made of two cylindrical which crossed over each other, four columns which could support 10,000 tonnes. Today, the arena is used for concerts, fairs and various other sporting events (among others, six-day races since 1971).

Less than 100m away from the Stade de glace, and also in Parc Paul Mistral, the 400m track for the speed skating events was installed between February and November 1966. The venue Patinoire de vitesse, which does not have a roof and has a practice ice-rink in the middle of it, had a capacity of 2,500. The cooling system was removed after a few years and today the concrete track is used by roller skaters. The existing was the city's ice-rink Patinoire Municipale, which opened in September 1963, next to the speed skating track, where the 1964 European Figure Skating Championships took place. The arena, which has 2,000 seats and 700 can stand, was the venue for Group B's ice hockey matches.

The venue for the alpine skiing was Chamrousse, a town 30 kilometres east of Grenoble. The finish line for five out of the six races was in the region of Recoin de Chamrousse, the other was the men's downhill event was in Casserousse. In the construction of the new ski slopes, around 300,000m^{3} of rocks had to be blown up or dug away; particularly large movements of the earth and changes to the terrain were necessary in the upper part of the men's downhill section and in the slalom section. In addition, six new chairlifts were installed. In the preparation of the slopes, over 10,000 people were needed, this consisted mainly of soldiers.

In Autrans, 36 kilometres west of Grenoble in Vercors Massif, the cross-country skiing and biathlon events took place there. Provisional stands at the finish line were available for spectators, which were to the north and southwest of the village. Also in Autrans, the ski jumping in the normal hill took place. The ski jumping hill of Le Claret is still in use today. It originally had a hill size of 70m, but later was made bigger and now measures 90m high.

The 90m hill could have been built without any problems in Autrans, but the organisers decided instead to use Saint-Nizier-du-Moucherotte, 17 kilometres away from Grenoble, as well as Vercors-Massif. The relatively small distance to the city and the better accessibility guaranteed a larger audience. The construction period lasted from July 1966 to January 1967. After the games, the Dauphine hill was rarely used and closed down and fell into ruin beginning in 1990. A third Olympic venue in the Vercors-Massif was Villard-de-Lans, 34 kilometres from Grenoble, where the luge competition took place. The track is exactly 1,000m long, has 14 curves and has a drop of 110m. After it temporarily closed down in 1994 it was remodelled. Today, it now has an artificial surface which makes it possible to use all-year-round. It is no longer used for competitions.

The third Olympic venue in Vercors Massif was 34 km away from Grenoble in the commune of Villard-de-Lans, where the luge competition took place. The track for the luge was exactly 1 km long, had 14 corners and had a drop of 110m. After the track was temporarily closed in 1994, it was rebuilt at today's location. It has an artificial surface, which makes using the track all year round possible. For competitions it is no longer used.

The furthest distance, which is also the highest, is L'Alpe d'Huez, 65 kilometres southeast of Grenoble. The bobsleigh took place at Col de Poutran at a height of around 2,000m. It was 1,500m long, had 13 corners and had a drop of 140m. It was principally a natural course, but three of the corners were exposed to direct sunlight, and was kept artificially frozen by ammonia and liquid nitrogen. In L'Alpe d'Huez, a replacement course was made available for the alpine skiing.

== Accommodation ==
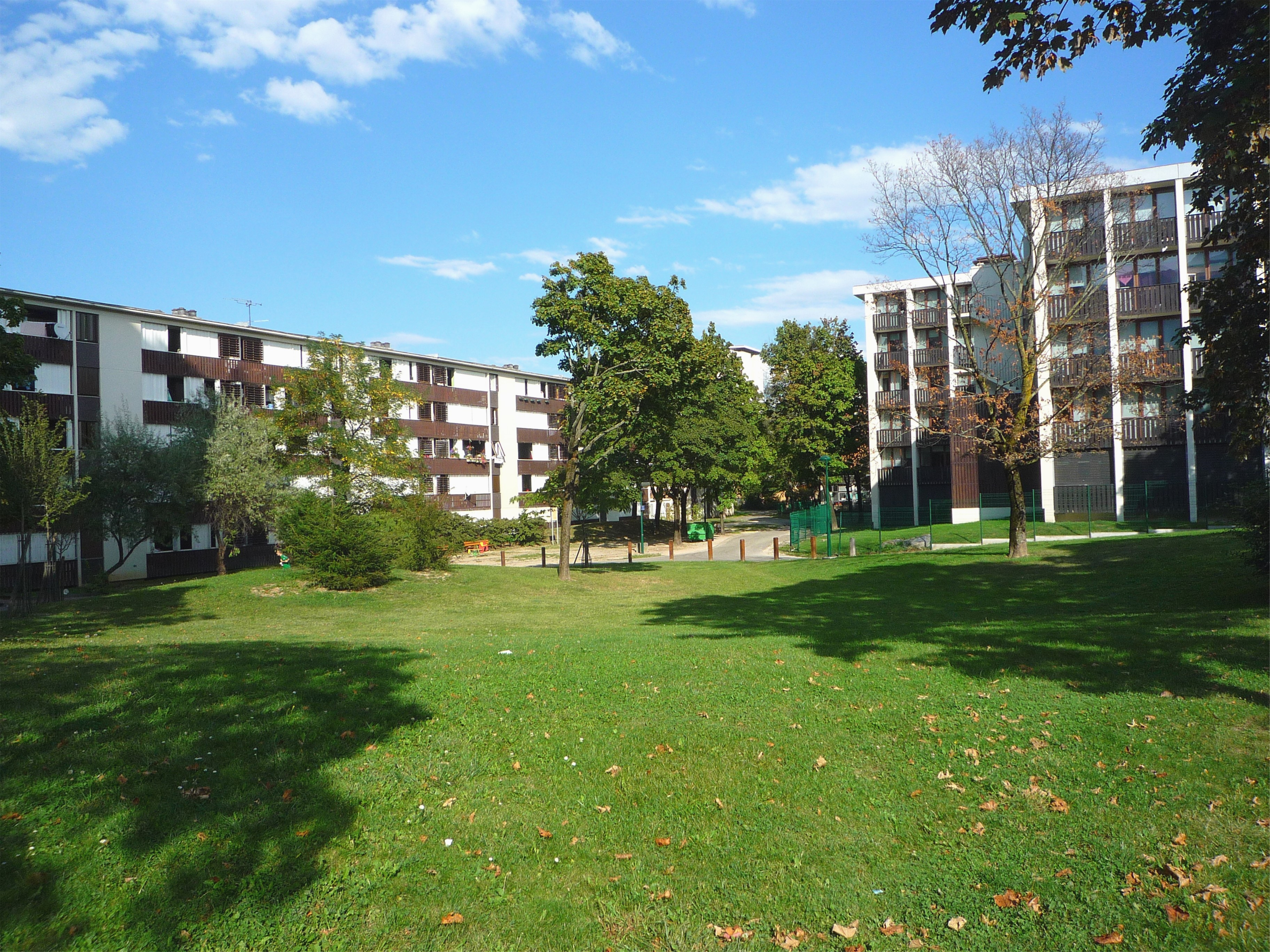
Olympic Village in 2014.

The Olympic Village was located in the southern part of the city on the border with the suburbs of Échirolles and Eybens. The chosen place was the site of the former Grenoble-Mermoz Airport, a large housing estate with 6,500 rooms was built in two years. After the games some areas was turned a primary school, secondary school, nursery, youth center, shopping center, and a library. The public places are still in use today. The male athletes were housed in a tower block and in eleven apartment blocks. The female athletes lived in a building with 263 individual rooms, which later went on to serve as a home for workers. Other buildings on the estate housed around 12,000 trainers, officials, timekeepers, volunteers, police and drivers. The catering took place in a future school kitchen. Two more secondary Olympic villages were available to the Nordic and Alpine skiers as well as their physios. Holiday homes were also newly built and were located in Autrans and Chamrousse. A year before the Olympics, there was great adversity at the pre-Olympic competitions. The accommodation did not meet the necessary standards, so much so the Austrian team left the village and housed in a local hotel. This led the hosts to have a rethink and make improvements.

== Sports ==
There were 35 events contested in 6 sports (10 disciplines).

- Alpine skiing (6)
- Biathlon (2)
- Bobsleigh (2)
- Cross-country skiing (7)
- Figure skating (3)
- Ice hockey (1)
- Luge (3)
- Nordic combined (1)
- Ski jumping (2)
- Speed skating (8)

== Participating nations ==
In Grenoble, there were 1158 athletes and 37 teams, a new record in terms of the number of participants. This was Morocco's first appearance at the Winter Olympics.

Participating National Olympic Committees
- Argentina (5)
- Australia (3)
- Austria (76)
- Bulgaria (6)
- Canada (70)
- Chile (4)
- Czechoslovakia (48)
- Denmark (3)
- East Germany (57)
- Finland (52)
- France (75) (host)
- Great Britain (38)
- Greece (3)
- Hungary (10)
- Iceland (4)
- India (1)
- Iran (4)
- Italy (52)
- Japan (61)
- Lebanon (3)
- Liechtenstein (9)
- Mongolia (7)
- Morocco (5)
- Netherlands (9)
- New Zealand (6)
- Norway (65)
- Poland (31)
- Romania (30)
- South Korea (8)
- Soviet Union (74)
- Spain (19)
- Sweden (68)
- Switzerland (34)
- Turkey (11)
- United States (95)
- West Germany (87)
- Yugoslavia (30)

=== The case of Germany ===
Similar to the 1952 Summer Olympics with Saarland, who had sent its own team but had not been integrated as a part of West Germany, there were two teams participating from Germany.

For the first time, the German Democratic Republic (East Germany) was present with its own team. It was provisionally accepted into the IOC, as long as it formed a complete German team consisting of athletes from both the West and East. This had to be done under the leadership of the National Olympic Committee for Germany, a board recognised by the IOC. Following on from this, the National Olympic Committee of East Germany tried to achieve complete recognition. This did not work out because of resistance from Karl Ritter von Halt, the president of the National Olympic Committee for Germany, who was close friends with then-IOC president Avery Brundage. After Halt died in 1961, the same year the Berlin Wall was built by East Germany to prevent the defections of its citizens to the West, the close contact with the IOC leadership was lost under his successor Willi Daume. The reality of the split made the qualification almost impossible. On 8 October 1965, the IOC decided to accept East Germany as a full member. Both national olympic committees agreed on using the same flag and anthem. The black-red-gold flag with the white Olympic rings in the middle of it has been used at all Olympic Games since 1960, as well as the replacement anthem "Ode an die Freude" (Ode to Joy) from Beethoven's 9th symphony, which was used previously. Both countries presented themselves as completely independent from 1972, using their respective national flags and anthems.

On 21 January 1968, 21-year-old Ralph Pöhland, one of the most famous East German winter olympians, fled to West Germany after the pre-Olympic tournament at Les Bioux, Switzerland. His assistant in helping to flee was Georg Thoma, a West German ski jumper. This incident led to relationships between the two German teams turning sour, which never used to be the case.

=== Number of athletes by National Olympic Committees ===
IOC Letter Code	Country	Athletes
USA	United States	95
ALL	West Germany	87
AUT	Austria	76
FRA	France	75
SOV	Soviet Union	74
CAN	Canada	70
SWE	Sweden	68
NOR	Norway	65
JPN	Japan	61
GDR	East Germany	57
FIN	Finland	52
ITA	Italy	52
TCH	Czechoslovakia	48
GBR	Great Britain	38
SUI	Switzerland	34
POL	Poland	31
ROM	Romania	30
JUG	Yugoslavia	30
SPA	Spain	19
TUR	Turkey	11
HUN	Hungary	10
LIC	Liechtenstein	9
HOL	Netherlands	9
KOR	South Korea	8
MON	Mongolia	7
BUL	Bulgaria	6
NZE	New Zealand	6
ARG	Argentina	5
MAR	Morocco	5
CHI	Chile	4
ISL	Iceland	4
IRA	Iran	4
AUS	Australia	3
DAN	Denmark	3
GRE	Greece	3
LIB	Lebanon	3
IND	India	1
Total		1158

== Medal table ==
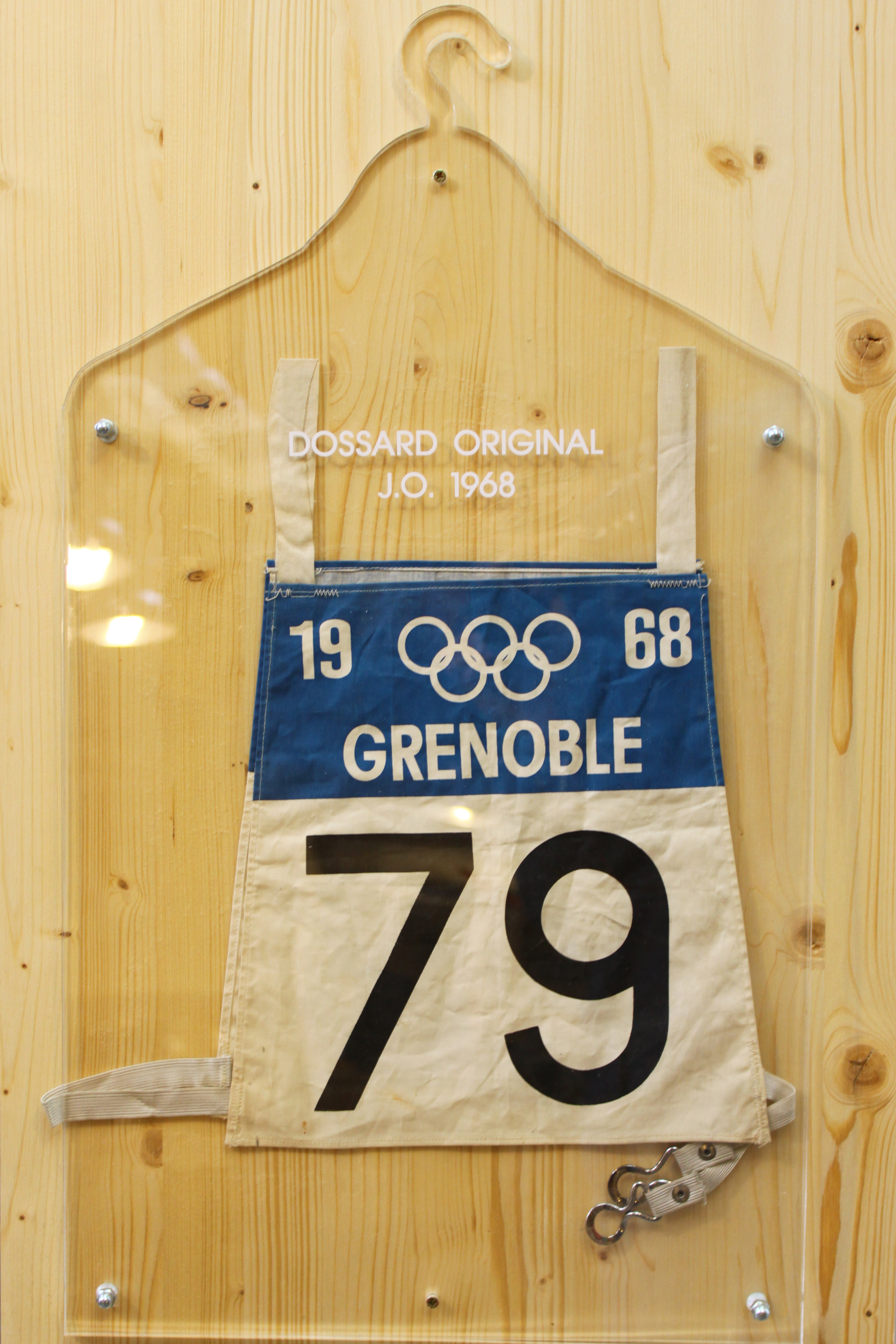
Bib used during the games.

These are the top ten nations that won medals at the 1968 Winter Games.

* Host nation (France)

Rank	Nation	Gold	Silver	Bronze	Total
1	Norway	6	6	2	14
2	Soviet Union	5	5	3	13
3	France*	4	3	2	9
4	Italy	4	0	0	4
5	Austria	3	4	4	11
6	Netherlands	3	3	3	9
7	Sweden	3	2	3	8
8	West Germany	2	2	3	7
9	United States	1	5	1	7
10	East Germany	1	2	2	5
10	Finland	1	2	2	5
Totals (11 entries)		33	34	25	92

=== Medals and diplomas ===
For the 1968 Winter Games, 228 gold, silver and bronze medals were manufactured in total, designed by Roger Excoffon and coined by French minting company Monnaie de Paris. For the first time in Olympic history, the medals, given out for the winners in every sport, had their own design. The logo of the games was depicted on the front of the medal, and on the back was a pictogram etched into the surface that depicted the sport that the medal winner competed in. The medals had a diameter of 50 mm (2 in) and were 3 mm (0 in) thick. The gold and silver medals consisted of silver with a composition of 925/1000, but the gold medals were coated in an additional six grams of gold. The medals hang of ribbons in the Olympic colours, which happened to also be a first, as they had used chains before 1968. In addition, the athletes received a box made of black leather, lined with either white, blue or red silk.

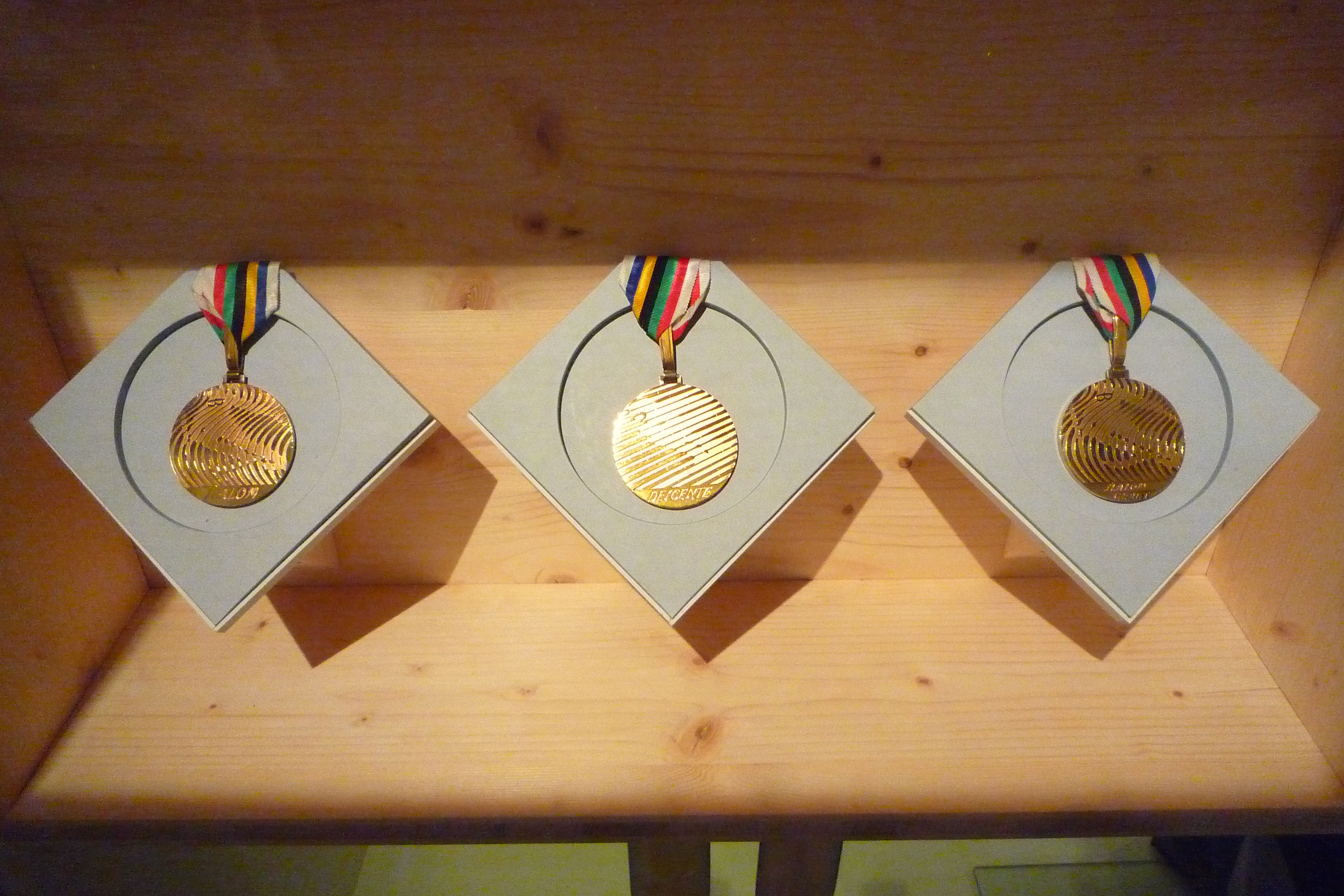
The gold medals of Jean-Claude Killy during the exhibition celebrating the fiftieth anniversary of the Games at the Musée dauphinois.

The commemoration medal was designed by Josette Hébert-Coeffin. The front side of the medal depicted the decorated head of a Greek athlete with snowflakes and ice crystals in the background. The other side depicted the silhouette of Grenoble in front of the mountain range Belladonne. There were three different types of medals. 20 were made of silver, 210 of silver-coated bronze and 15,000 of bronze.

Excoffon also designed the Olympic diplomas, which were given to the six best athletes in each discipline. They were made of cream coloured parchment paper. Around the logo contained the words "X^{es} Jeux Olympiques d'Hiver Grenoble 1968", as well as the Olympic motto "Citius, altius, fortius". In the middle of the paper, the word "Diplome" was written in gold writing. However, similar diplome were handed out to officials, participants, journalists and volunteers on ordinary white paper and without the gold writing as a souvenir.

The medal ceremonies took place in the evening of the finals event in the Stade de Glace.

== Schedule ==
Compared to the 1964 Winter Olympics in Innsbruck, the number of disciplines increased to 35, and the men's biathlon relay was also added.

On 4 February, two days before the official opening ceremony, the first ice hockey preliminary matches took place. This games had a function to lead the vacant spots for 4 teams, the three winners are placed into Group A alongside the five teams already assigned to the group. The losing team was placed into Group B.

== Calendar ==
●	Opening ceremony	●	Event competitions	●	Event finals	●	Closing ceremony

February	4th Sun	5th Mon	6th Tue	7th Wed	8th Thu	9th Fri	10th Sat	11th Sun	12th Mon	13th Tue	14th Wed	15th Thu	16th Fri	17th Sat	18th Sun
Ceremonies			●												●
Alpine Skiing						2	1	●	1	1		1	●	1	
Biathlon															
Bobsleigh					●	1					●	1			
Cross-country skiing				1		1	1			1	1		1	1	
Figure Skating					●		1	●			●	1	1		
Ice hockey	●			●	●	●	●	●	●	●	●	●	●	1	
Luge										●	●	2		●	1
Nordic combined						●	1								
Ski Jumping								1							1
Speed Skating					1	1	1	1			1	1	1	1	

== Ceremonies ==
=== Opening ceremony ===
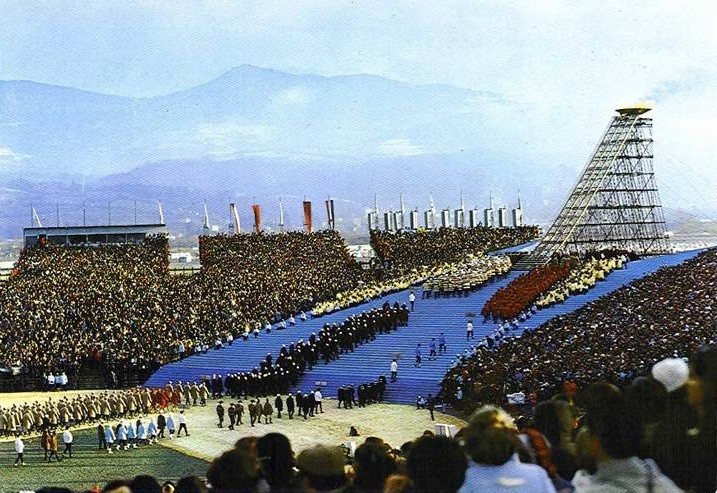
Opening Ceremony in the Olympic Stadium.

For first time, a temporary stadium was built to host the ceremonies, supported by scaffolding and able to hold 60,000 spectators. The Olympic Stadium was situated in the immediate vicinity to the Olympic Village and IBC/MPC. At the back of the stadium, there was a steel scaffold that kept host to the Olympic flame, located in a 4m wide bowl at the top, which also was able to take 550 kg in weight. There were also stairs leading to the top, containing 96 steps.

The ceremony began on Tuesday, 6 February at 3:00 p.m., with French president Charles de Gaulle in attendance. Among the 500 invited guests of honour was IOC president Avery Brundage, the Irani empress Farah Pahlavi, the Danish Princess Margrethe and the Grand Duchess of Luxembourg Joséphine Charlotte. After the Marseillaise was sung, the French national anthem, cultural performances followed.

The procession of the athletes into the stadium was traditionally led by the Greek team. The other teams proceeded into the stadium in alphabetical order, starting with West Germany (Allemagne) and then East Germany (Allemagne d'Est). The last team out was the hosts, the French team. Albert Michallon, president of COJO, said in his speech that all athletes and visitors were welcome. Brundage again recollected Pierre de Coubertin's ideals and expressed the hope of these ideals lead to a peaceful and less materialistic world. He invited Charles de Gaulle to open the Games. De Gaulle appeared on the stage and read out the opening set-phrase.

14 Chasseurs Alpins soldiers carried a giant 54m2 Olympic flag into the stadium and hoisted. The organisers had decided against the usual tradition of letting the peace dove fly. Instead, they let out 500 small Olympic flags on paper parachutes and 30,000 perfumed paper roses from three helicopters over the stadium. Following this, figure skater Alain Calmat was the last torch bearer to enter the stadium. He climbed up the steps to the bowl, where his a sound of his heartbeat amplified over the loudspeakers. Once at the top, he lit the Olympic flame.

Shortly afterwards, skier Léo Lacroix read out the Olympic Oath. At the end, the Patrouille de France, the aerobatic flight display team, flew over the stadium and marked out the colours of the Olympic rings with their vapour trails in the sky.

=== Closing ceremony ===
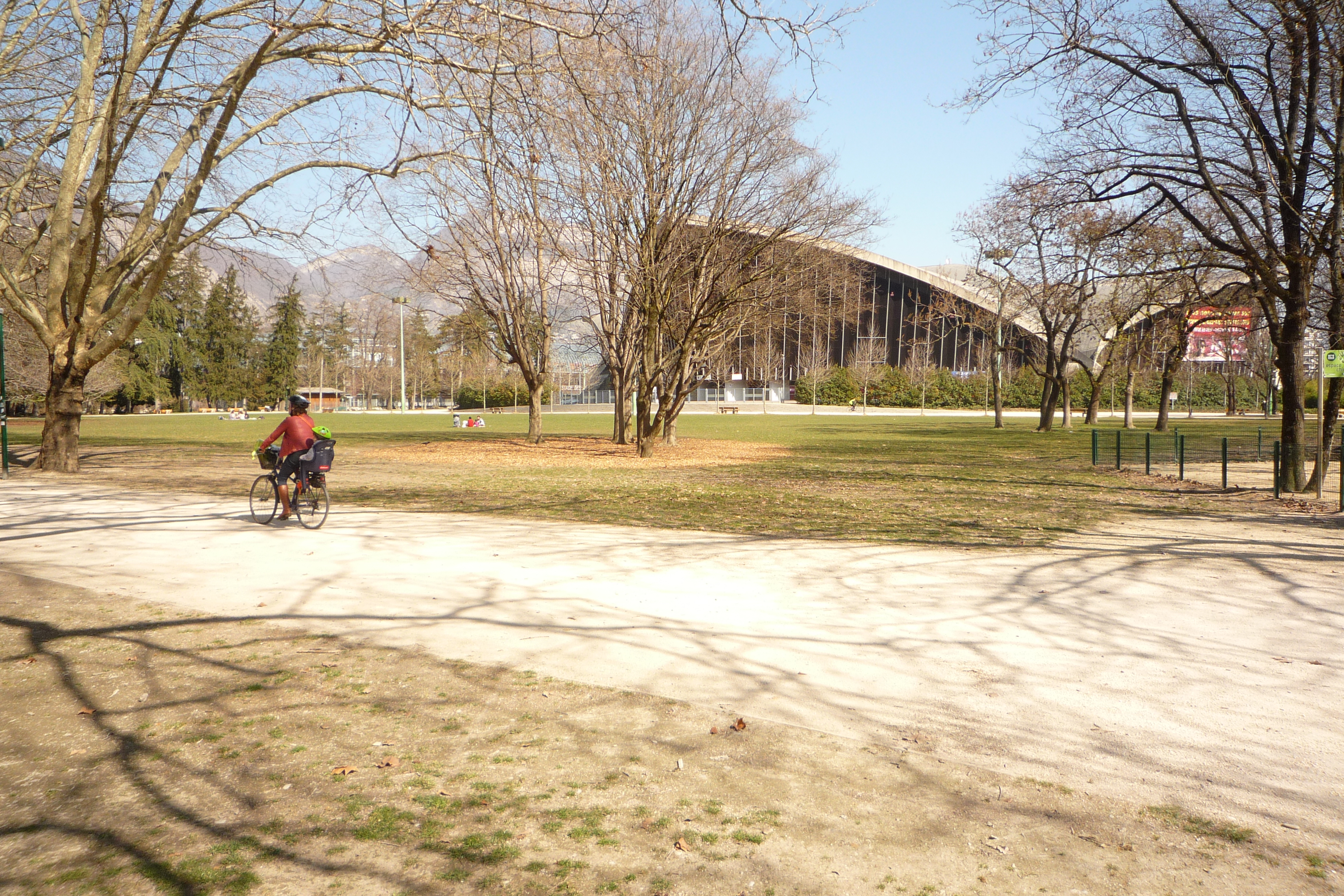
Stade de glace in Paul Mistral Park.

The Winter Olympics ended on Sunday, 18 February, with the closing ceremony in the Ice Stadium. The first highlight was the figure skaters gala session. It also included ice dancing, an event that was first introduced into the main programme eight years after in 1976. The best ten partners from the last world championship took part in the event and there was no scores. After that, the last award ceremonies then took place.

After the Marseillaise was played, all athletes who were still in Grenoble reassembled onto the ice and the flag bearers formed a semi-circle. Whilst the flags of Greece, France and next host Japan were put up, a torchbearer brought the Olympic flame into the stadium and ignited it into a small cauldron on the center of ice. IOC president Avery Brundage thanked the organisers and declared the games over. When the Olympic flag was lowed and retired from the venue, gun salutes were heard all across the town and finally the flame went out.

== Top athletes and performances ==
The most successful participants
Pos.	Athlete	Nation	Event	Gold	Silver	Bronze	Total
1	Jean-Claude Killy	France	Alpine Skiing	3	0	0	3
2	Toini Gustafsson	Sweden	Cross-country	2	1	0	3
3	Harald Grønningen	Norway	Cross-country	2	0	0	2
3	Ole Ellefsæter	Norway	Cross-country	2	0	0	2
3	Eugenio Monti	Italy	Bobsleigh	2	0	0	2
3	Luciano De Paolis	Italy	Bobsleigh	2	0	0	2

11-years-old Romanian figure skater Beatrice Huștiu became the youngest female participant at the 1968 Winter Games. She took part in the singles event and finished in 29th place, which was third from bottom. The youngest male participant was aged 12 years and 110 days. He was also a figure skater called Jan Hoffmann, who represented East Germany. In Grenoble, he finished in 26th place and was also third from bottom. In 1974 and 1980, he became world champion, and in 1980, he won silver in the Olympic Games at Lake Placid.

American speed skater Dianne Holum was the youngest medal winner. She won silver in the 500m event at the age of 16 years and 266 days. Two days later, she added a bronze by competing in the 1000m event. The youngest gold medal winner was also from the United States: 19-year-old figure skater Peggy Fleming.

The oldest medal winner and oldest gold medal winner was 40-year-old Italian Eugenio Monti, who won the gold medal in the four-man bobsleigh team. Five days before, he had also won the two-man bobsleigh team gold medal.

== Doping and gender control ==
The public became more aware of the doping issue during the 1960s. The first death caused by doping at the Olympic Games occurred in 1960 in Rome, when Danish cyclist Knut Enemark Jensen, who took amphetamines, fell off his bike and died. It took four years until the IOC recognised the seriousness of the situation and created a medical commission. In 1967, the IOC followed the example set by other sport associations and proclaimed a ban on doping. For the first time, doping control was carried out at the 1968 Winter Olympics. The IOC tested 86 athletes but all the tests came back negative.

Also in 1967, the IOC decided to carry out gender controls in order to prevent intersex people from competing at women's competitions. Multiple athletes from Eastern Europe immediately retired after the IOC had decided this, which led to much speculation. Erik Schinegger, the 1966 female downhill world champion from Austria, was tested a couple of days before the 1968 Winter Games. It turned out Schinegger had been born with internal sex organs doctors had never tested for. After learning of this condition, Schinegger ultimately decided to have gender reassignment surgery and legally changed his first name from Erika to Erik.

== Media coverage ==
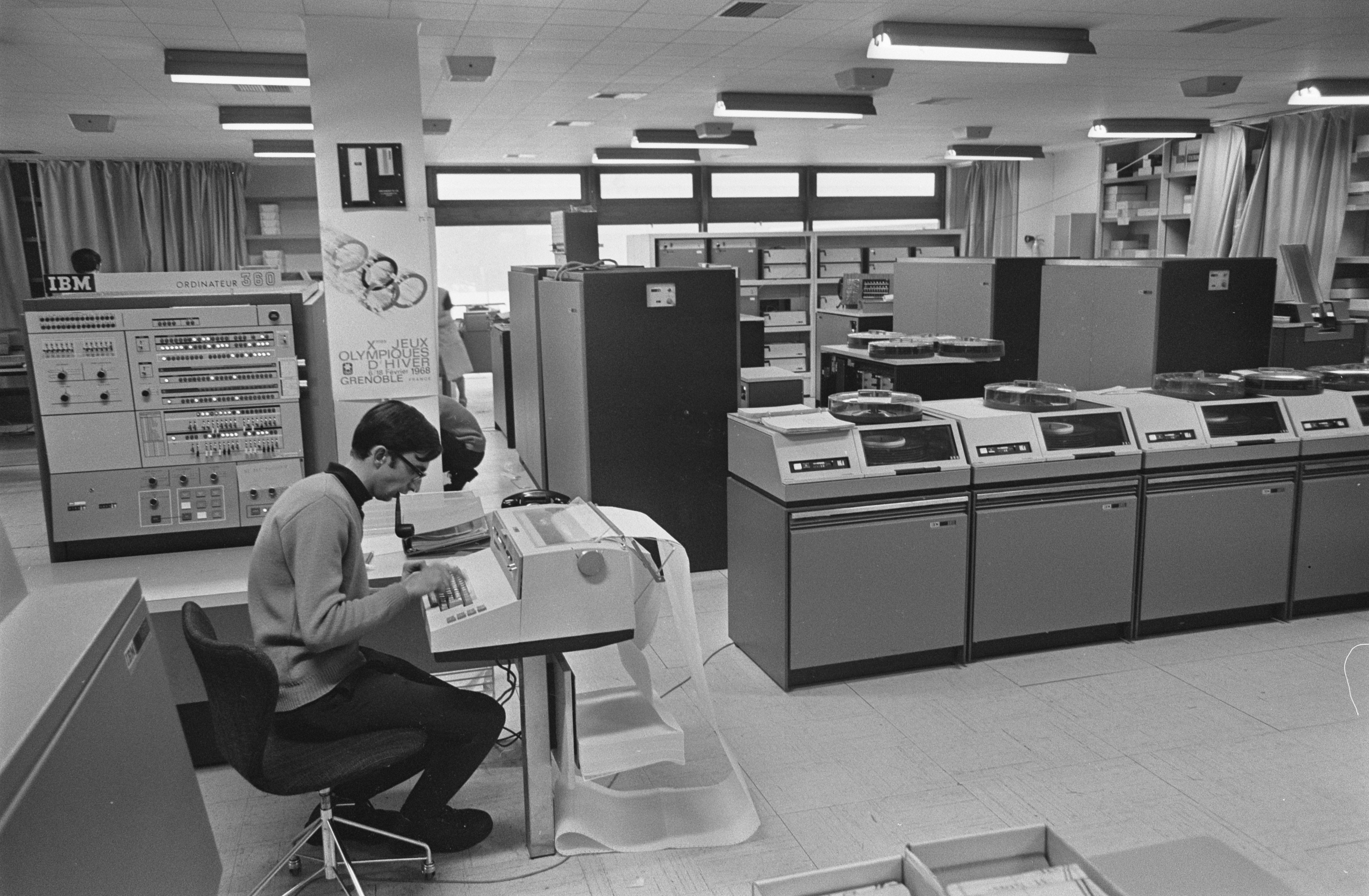
Preparation for the Olympics at the IBM computer center in January 1968

The media representatives lived in an apartment complex built between April 1966 and October 1967, a few hundred meters away from the Olympic village in Malherbe, a central part of Grenoble. The complex consisted of seven eight to ten floored towers totaling 637 flats, an underground car park and a school. The school housed an IBM computer center, a copy center, the studios of French radio and TV broadcaster ORTF and broadcasters from other countries, photo laboratories, and other technical amenities. The offices of the newspaper and photo journalists, the technicians, and the general administration were situated on the bottom floors of the towers, the other floors serving as accommodation. The press restaurant was later used as a car park. There were also smaller press centers in the Stade de glace in Grenoble, and at the five other venues in Autrans, Chamrousse, L'Alpe d'Huez, Saint-Nizier-du-Moucherotte, and Villard-de-Lans.

The organising committee COJO assigned 1,545 accreditations to the following people: 1,095 went to press, radio and television journalists, 301 to photographers, and 149 to other unnamed groups. On 19 September 1966, COJO signed an exclusive contract with ORTF for the provision of broadcasting on the television to EBU's catchment area and to Canada. On 14 February 1967, the American Broadcasting Company (ABC) received the exclusive broadcasting rights for the United States and Latin America. On 15 October 1967, NHK received the rights to broadcast in Japan.

For the first time in the history of the Olympic Games, the Games were transmitted in colour. ORTF installed 25 colour and 37 black and white cameras (ABC had an independent broadcasting system). The total broadcasting time lasted 150 hours and 15 mins, 91 hours and 25 mins were in colour. The total number of viewers was recorded at 600 million.

Concerning the question of scoring the men's freestyle figure skating and the unfortunate circumstances of the men's slalom, the Bild am Sonntag published the title "Am Ende kam der große Krach" ("At the end there was a great bust-up"). The Münchner Merkur said they would have tolerated Schranz's disqualification, but the incidents in the figure skating had led to a bitter aftertaste.

== See also ==
- 1968 Summer Paralympics
- 1968 Summer Olympics
- Olympic Games held in France
  - 1900 Summer Olympics – Paris
  - 1924 Summer Olympics – Paris
  - 1924 Winter Olympics – Chamonix
  - 1968 Winter Olympics – Grenoble
  - 1992 Winter Olympics – Albertville
  - 2024 Summer Olympics – Paris
  - 2030 Winter Olympics – French Alps
- List of IOC country codes

Winter Olympics
Preceded by Innsbruck	X Olympic Winter Games; Grenoble; 1968	Succeeded by Sapporo
