= Alpine skiing at the 1964 Winter Olympics – Men's slalom =

Men's slalom at the IX Olympic Winter Games
- Alpine skiing
- Venue: Axamer Lizum
- Date: February 7–8, 1964
- Competitors: 96 from 28 nations
- Winning time: 2:11.13

Medalists
1st place, gold medalist(s)		Pepi Stiegler	Austria
2nd place, silver medalist(s)		Billy Kidd	United States
3rd place, bronze medalist(s)		Jimmie Heuga	United States

The Men's slalom competition of the Innsbruck 1964 Olympics was held on 8 February at Axamer Lizum.

The defending world champion was Charles Bozon of France.

== Final ==
Rank	Name	Country	Run 1	Run 2	Total	Difference
1st place, gold medalist(s)	Pepi Stiegler	Austria	1:09.03	1:02.10	2:11.13	—
2nd place, silver medalist(s)	Billy Kidd	United States	1:10.96	1:00.31	2:11.27	+0.14
3rd place, bronze medalist(s)	Jimmie Heuga	United States	1:10.16	1:01.36	2:11.52	+0.39
4	Michel Arpin	France	1:11.16	1:01.75	2:12.91	+1.78
5	Luggi Leitner	United Team of Germany	1:11.19	1:01.75	2:12.94	+1.81
6	Adolf Mathis	Switzerland	1:10.77	1:02.22	2:12.99	+1.86
7	Gerhard Nenning	Austria	1:10.29	1:02.91	2:13.20	+2.07
8	Buddy Werner	United States	1:11.64	1:01.82	2:13.46	+2.33
9	Wolfgang Bartels	United Team of Germany	1:13.83	1:02.09	2:15.92	+4.79
10	Stefan Kälin	Switzerland	1:13.92	1:02.12	2:16.04	+4.91
11	Italo Pedroncelli	Italy	1:13.94	1:02.38	2:16.32	+5.19
12	Guy Périllat	France	1:17.00	0:59.33	2:16.33	+5.20
13	Ernst Scherzer	United Team of Germany	1:14.67	1:03.43	2:18.10	+6.97
14	Willy Favre	Switzerland	1:13.63	1:04.59	2:18.22	+7.09
15	Ivo Mahlknecht	Italy	1:13.69	1:04.54	2:18.23	+7.10
16	Per Martin Sunde	Norway	1:14.23	1:04.13	2:18.36	+7.23
17	Paride Milianti	Italy	1:13.50	1:04.90	2:18.40	+7.27
18	Eberhard Riedel	United Team of Germany	1:13.57	1:05.28	2:18.85	+7.72
19	Peter Duncan	Canada	1:14.22	1:04.88	2:19.10	+7.97
20	Martino Fill	Italy	1:14.53	1:05.10	2:19.63	+8.50
21	Hias Leitner	Austria	1:17.07	1:02.57	2:19.64	+8.51
22	Raimo Manninen	Finland	1:14.82	1:05.45	2:20.27	+9.14
23	Yoshiharu Fukuhara	Japan	1:14.35	1:06.36	2:20.71	+9.58
24	Karl Schranz	Austria	1:10.04	1:11.54	2:21.58	+10.45
25	Vasily Melnikov	Soviet Union	1:16.18	1:06.43	2:22.61	+11.48
26	Rune Lindström	Sweden	1:16.00	1:06.68	2:22.68	+11.55
27	Bronisław Trzebunia	Poland	1:16.27	1:06.46	2:22.73	+11.60
28	Olle Rolén	Sweden	1:16.14	1:06.94	2:23.08	+11.95
29	Jon Terje Øverland	Norway	1:19.16	1:05.68	2:24.84	+13.71
30	Jerzy Woyna Orlewicz	Poland	1:18.31	1:06.68	2:24.99	+13.86
31	Hajime Tomii	Japan	1:18.49	1:06.60	2:25.09	+13.96
32	Peter Lakota	Yugoslavia	1:18.59	1:07.65	2:26.24	+15.11
33	Andrzej Dereziński	Poland	1:18.21	1:09.30	2:27.51	+16.38
34	Yoshinari Kida	Japan	1:19.11	1:10.00	2:29.11	+17.98
35	Arild Holm	Norway	1:21.14	1:08.77	2:29.91	+18.78
36	Hans-Walter Schädler	Liechtenstein	1:20.29	1:11.71	2:32.00	+20.87
37	Javier Masana	Spain	1:22.10	1:13.57	2:35.67	+24.54
38	Yoshihiro Ohira	Japan	1:28.79	1:09.08	2:37.87	+26.74
39	Árni Sigurðsson	Iceland	1:25.34	1:13.78	2:39.12	+27.99
-	Jos Minsch	Switzerland	1:15.07	DQ	-	-
-	Lars Olsson	Sweden	1:18.74	DQ	-	-
-	Anton Šoltýs	Czechoslovakia	1:30.00	DQ	-	-
-	François Bonlieu	France	DQ	-	-	-
-	Jean-Guy Brunet	Canada	DQ	-	-	-
-	Bengt-Erik Grahn	Sweden	DQ	-	-	-
-	Chuck Ferries	United States	DQ	-	-	-
-	Jean-Claude Killy	France	DQ	-	-	-
-	Rod Hebron	Canada	DQ	-	-	-
-	Ulf Ekstam	Finland	DQ	-	-	-

== Qualifying ==
=== Round 1 ===
The top 25 finishers advanced directly to the final, the others went to round two.

Rank	Name	Country	Time	Difference
1	François Bonlieu	France	51.23	-
2	Luggi Leitner	United Team of Germany	51.45	+0.22
3	Guy Périllat	France	52.33	+1.10
4	Jimmy Heuga	United States	52.45	+1.22
5	Buddy Werner	United States	53.19	+1.96
6	Pepi Stiegler	Austria	53.41	+2.18
6	Adolf Mathis	Switzerland	53.41	+2.18
8	Karl Schranz	Austria	53.55	+2.32
9	Vasily Melnikov	Soviet Union	53.59	+2.36
10	Gerhard Nenning	Austria	53.60	+2.37
11	Billy Kidd	United States	53.73	+2.50
12	Stefan Kälin	Switzerland	53.93	+2.70
13	Michel Arpin	France	54.07	+2.84
14	Italo Pedroncelli	Italy	54.22	+2.99
15	Willy Favre	Switzerland	54.29	+3.06
16	Rune Lindström	Sweden	54.43	+3.20
17	Jerzy Woyna Orlewicz	Poland	54.55	+3.32
18	Paride Milianti	Italy	54.67	+3.44
19	Ernst Scherzer	United Team of Germany	54.77	+3.54
20	Hias Leitner	Austria	54.90	+3.67
21	Jon Terje Øverland	Norway	54.90	+3.67
22	Jos Minsch	Switzerland	54.95	+3.72
23	Jean-Guy Brunet	Canada	54.98	+3.75
24	Bengt-Erik Grahn	Sweden	54.99	+3.76
25	Chuck Ferries	United States	55.17	+3.94
26	Per Martin Sunde	Norway	55.24	+4.01
27	Arild Holm	Norway	55.57	+4.34
28	Tally Monastyryov	Soviet Union	55.71	+4.48
29	Jean-Claude Killy	France	55.79	+4.56
30	Eberhard Riedel	United Team of Germany	55.88	+4.65
31	Yoshihiro Ohira	Japan	56.31	+5.08
32	Raimo Manninen	Finland	56.33	+5.10
33	Valery Shein	Soviet Union	56.33	+5.10
34	Martino Fill	Italy	56.43	+5.20
35	Andrzej Dereziński	Poland	56.75	+5.52
36	Ulf Ekstam	Finland	57.11	+5.88
37	Yoshinari Kida	Japan	57.36	+6.13
38	Bronisław Trzebunia	Poland	57.72	+6.49
39	Peter Lakota	Yugoslavia	57.84	+6.61
40	Wolfgang Bartels	United Team of Germany	57.91	+6.68
41	Petar Angelov	Bulgaria	58.14	+6.91
42	Olle Rolén	Sweden	58.39	+7.16
43	Anton Šoltýs	Czechoslovakia	58.67	+7.44
44	Juan Garriga	Spain	59.53	+8.30
45	Lars Olsson	Sweden	59.80	+8.57
46	Jóhann Vilbergsson	Iceland	60.39	+9.16
47	Javier Masana	Spain	60.95	+9.72
48	Hans-Walter Schädler	Liechtenstein	61.53	+10.30
49	Yoshiharu Fukuhara	Japan	61.66	+10.43
50	Charles Westenholz	Great Britain	61.96	+10.73
51	Luis Sánchez	Spain	62.40	+11.17
52	Francisco Cortes	Chile	64.43	+13.20
53	Osvaldo Ancinas	Argentina	64.63	+13.40
54	Piers, Baron de Westenholz	Great Britain	65.12	+13.89
55	Peter Brockhoff	Australia	65.32	+14.09
56	Fayzollah Band Ali	Iran	65.60	+14.37
57	Josef Gassner	Liechtenstein	65.78	+14.55
58	Simon Brown	Australia	66.83	+15.60
59	Rod Hebron	Canada	67.56	+16.33
60	Juan Holz	Chile	67.56	+16.33
61	Nazih Geagea	Lebanon	68.21	+16.98
62	Lotfollah Kia Shemshaki	Iran	68.47	+17.24
63	Peter Wenzel	Australia	68.68	+17.45
64	Jonathan Taylor	Great Britain	68.73	+17.50
65	Árni Sigurðsson	Iceland	69.03	+17.80
66	August Wolfinger	Liechtenstein	69.75	+18.52
67	Prince Karim Aga Khan	Iran	71.92	+20.69
68	John Rigby	Great Britain	72.16	+20.93
69	Muzaffer Demirhan	Turkey	72.26	+21.03
70	Zeki Şamiloğlu	Turkey	72.81	+21.58
71	Oto Pustoslemšek	Yugoslavia	73.82	+22.59
72	Luis Viu	Spain	74.06	+22.83
73	Vicente Vera	Chile	74.82	+23.59
74	Ivo Mahlknecht	Italy	76.97	+25.74
75	Jean Keyrouz	Lebanon	77.36	+26.13
76	Osman Yüce	Turkey	78.75	+27.52
77	Vasilios Makridis	Greece	79.70	+28.47
78	Hajime Tomii	Japan	80.85	+29.62
79	Manuel Mena	Argentina	85.60	+34.37
80	Bahattin Topal	Turkey	85.99	+34.76
81	Michel Rahme	Lebanon	86.76	+35.53
82	Konstantinos Karydas	Greece	91.51	+40.28
83	Dimitrios Pappos	Greece	102.76	+51.53
84	Jo Yeong-Seok	South Korea	109.14	+57.91
85	Kim Dong-Baek	South Korea	121.88	+70.65
-	Kristinn Benediktsson	Iceland	DQ	-
-	Robert Swan	Canada	DQ	-
-	Jorge Abelardo Eiras	Argentina	DNF	-
-	Pedro Klempa	Argentina	DNF	-
-	Peter Duncan	Canada	DNF	-
-	Hernán Boher	Chile	DNF	-
-	Ovaness Meguerdonian	Iran	DNF	-
-	Sami Beyroun	Lebanon	DNF	-
-	Radim Koloušek	Czechoslovakia	DNF	-
-	Fric Detiček	Yugoslavia	DNF	-
-	Andrej Klinar	Yugoslavia	DNF	-

=== Round 2 ===
The top 25 finishers advanced directly to the final, the others went to round two.

Rank	Name	Country	Time	Difference
1	Jean-Claude Killy	France	53.79	-
2	Yoshiharu Fukuhara	Japan	54.07	+0.28
3	Eberhard Riedel	United Team of Germany	54.44	+0.65
4	Per Martin Sunde	Norway	55.03	+1.24
5	Raimo Manninen	Finland	55.41	+1.62
6	Peter Lakota	Yugoslavia	55.59	+1.80
7	Ivo Mahlknecht	Italy	55.78	+1.99
8	Wolfgang Bartels	United Team of Germany	55.84	+2.05
9	Rod Hebron	Canada	55.99	+2.20
10	Tally Monastyryov	Soviet Union	56.09	+2.30
11	Martino Fill	Italy	56.32	+2.53
12	Peter Duncan	Canada	56.43	+2.64
13	Bronisław Trzebunia	Poland	56.55	+2.76
14	Andrzej Dereziński	Poland	56.66	+2.87
15	Lars Olsson	Sweden	56.66	+2.87
16	Olle Rolén	Sweden	57.17	+3.38
17	Hajime Tomii	Japan	57.44	+3.65
18	Yoshinari Kida	Japan	58.06	+4.27
19	Yoshihiro Ohira	Japan	58.09	+4.30
20	Ulf Ekstam	Finland	58.48	+4.69
21	Javier Masana	Spain	59.14	+5.35
22	Arild Holm	Norway	59.31	+5.52
23	Anton Šoltýs	Czechoslovakia	59.45	+5.66
24	Hans-Walter Schädler	Liechtenstein	59.62	+5.83
25	Árni Sigurðsson	Iceland	59.67	+5.88
26	Luis Sánchez	Spain	60.56	+6.77
27	Kristinn Benediktsson	Iceland	60.57	+6.78
28	Charles Westenholz	Great Britain	60.99	+7.20
29	Jonathan Taylor	Great Britain	61.33	+7.54
30	Prince Karim Aga Khan	Iran	61.68	+7.89
31	Piers, Baron de Westenholz	Great Britain	61.89	+8.10
32	Josef Gassner	Liechtenstein	61.90	+8.11
33	Hernán Boher	Chile	61.95	+8.16
34	Jóhann Vilbergsson	Iceland	62.23	+8.44
35	John Rigby	Great Britain	62.45	+8.66
36	Luis Viu	Spain	63.18	+9.39
37	Fayzollah Band Ali	Iran	63.80	+10.01
39	Juan Holz	Chile	64.38	+10.59
38	Osvaldo Ancinas	Argentina	64.35	+10.56
40	Ovaness Meguerdonian	Iran	64.38	+10.59
41	Jorge Abelardo Eiras	Argentina	64.57	+10.78
42	Peter Brockhoff	Australia	64.58	+10.79
43	Fric Detiček	Yugoslavia	65.08	+11.29
44	Simon Brown	Australia	65.88	+12.09
45	Nazih Geagea	Lebanon	66.15	+12.36
46	Bahattin Topal	Turkey	67.69	+13.90
47	August Wolfinger	Liechtenstein	67.72	+13.93
48	Muzaffer Demirhan	Turkey	68.20	+14.41
49	Peter Wenzel	Australia	70.25	+16.46
50	Zeki Şamiloğlu	Turkey	72.03	+18.24
51	Manuel Mena	Argentina	75.88	+22.09
52	Jean Keyrouz	Lebanon	76.24	+22.45
53	Michel Rahme	Lebanon	81.19	+27.40
54	Jo Yeong-Seok	South Korea	88.53	+34.74
55	Konstantinos Karydas	Greece	97.46	+43.67
56	Vasilios Makridis	Greece	100.27	+46.48
-	Radim Koloušek	Czechoslovakia	DQ	-
-	Lotfollah Kia Shemshaki	Iran	DQ	-
-	Juan Garriga	Spain	DQ	-
-	Oto Pustoslemšek	Yugoslavia	DQ	-
-	Osman Yüce	Turkey	DQ	-
-	Sami Beyroun	Lebanon	DQ	-
-	Dimitrios Pappos	Greece	DQ	-
-	Andrej Klinar	Yugoslavia	DNF	-
-	Kim Dong-Baek	South Korea	DNF	-
-	Francisco Cortes	Chile	DNF	-
-	Pedro Klempa	Argentina	DNF	-
-	Petar Angelov	Bulgaria	DNF	-
-	Robert Swan	Canada	DNF	-
-	Valery Shein	Soviet Union	DNF	-
-	Vicente Vera	Chile	DNF	-
