= Alpine skiing at the 1964 Winter Olympics – Men's giant slalom =

Men's giant slalom at the IX Olympic Winter Games
- Alpine skiing
- Venue: Axamer Lizum
- Date: February 2, 1964
- Competitors: 96 from 28 nations
- Winning time: 1:46.71

Medalists
1st place, gold medalist(s)		François Bonlieu	France
2nd place, silver medalist(s)		Karl Schranz	Austria
3rd place, bronze medalist(s)		Pepi Stiegler	Austria

The Men's giant slalom competition of the Innsbruck 1964 Olympics was held on 2 February at Axamer Lizum.

The defending world champion was Egon Zimmermann of Austria.

== Results ==
Rank	Name	Country	Time	Difference
1st place, gold medalist(s)	François Bonlieu	France	1:46.71	—
2nd place, silver medalist(s)	Karl Schranz	Austria	1:47.09	+0.38
3rd place, bronze medalist(s)	Pepi Stiegler	Austria	1:48.05	+1.34
4	Willy Favre	Switzerland	1:48.69	+1.98
5	Jean-Claude Killy	France	1:48.92	+2.21
6	Gerhard Nenning	Austria	1:49.68	+2.97
7	Billy Kidd	United States	1:49.97	+3.26
8	Luggi Leitner	United Team of Germany	1:50.04	+3.33
9	Jos Minsch	Switzerland	1:50.61	+3.90
10	Guy Périllat	France	1:50.75	+4.04
11	Léo Lacroix	France	1:51.26	+4.55
12	Bill Marolt	United States	1:51.29	+4.58
13	Paride Milianti	Italy	1:52.87	+6.16
14	Beat von Allmen	Switzerland	1:54.05	+7.34
15	Eberhard Riedel	United Team of Germany	1:54.17	+7.46
16	Ivo Mahlknecht	Italy	1:54.26	+7.55
17	Raimo Manninen	Finland	1:55.05	+8.34
18	Italo Pedroncelli	Italy	1:55.14	+8.43
19	Edy Bruggmann	Switzerland	1:55.30	+8.59
20	Jon Terje Øverland	Norway	1:55.51	+8.80
21	Arild Holm	Norway	1:55.72	+9.01
22	Hajime Tomii	Japan	1:56.65	+9.94
23	Per Martin Sunde	Norway	1:56.77	+10.06
24	Rune Lindström	Sweden	1:57.06	+10.35
25	Yoshiharu Fukuhara	Japan	1:58.35	+11.64
26	Peter Duncan	Canada	1:58.44	+11.73
27	Jean-Guy Brunet	Canada	1:59.60	+12.89
28	Felice De Nicolo	Italy	1:59.62	+12.91
29	Bronisław Trzebunia	Poland	1:59.82	+13.11
30	Olle Rolén	Sweden	2:00.01	+13.30
31	Viktor Talyanov	Soviet Union	2:00.38	+13.67
32	Luis Viu	Spain	2:00.83	+14.12
33	Peter Lakota	Yugoslavia	2:00.98	+14.27
34	Valery Shein	Soviet Union	2:01.18	+14.47
35	Tsuneo Noto	Japan	2:01.26	+14.55
36	Ulf Ekstam	Finland	2:01.78	+15.07
37	Tally Monastyryov	Soviet Union	2:01.94	+15.23
38	Juan Garriga	Spain	2:03.85	+17.14
39	Yoshinari Kida	Japan	2:04.22	+17.51
40	Hans-Walter Schädler	Liechtenstein	2:05.08	+18.37
41	Jerzy Woyna Orlewicz	Poland	2:06.44	+19.73
42	John Rigby	Great Britain	2:07.92	+21.21
43	Jorge Abelardo Eiras	Argentina	2:08.38	+21.67
44	Hernán Boher	Chile	2:09.71	+23.00
45	Andrej Klinar	Yugoslavia	2:10.18	+23.47
46	August Wolfinger	Liechtenstein	2:10.64	+23.93
47	Josef Gassner	Liechtenstein	2:10.67	+23.96
48	Anton Šoltýs	Czechoslovakia	2:10.79	+24.08
49	Petar Angelov	Bulgaria	2:11.71	+25.00
50	Fric Detiček	Yugoslavia	2:11.76	+25.05
51	Simon Brown	Australia	2:12.61	+25.90
52	Pedro Klempa	Argentina	2:12.88	+26.17
53	Prince Karim Aga Khan	Iran	2:13.57	+26.86
54	Claudio Wernli	Chile	2:14.48	+27.77
55	Radim Koloušek	Czechoslovakia	2:14.70	+27.99
56	Árni Sigurðsson	Iceland	2:14.90	+28.19
57	Osvaldo Ancinas	Argentina	2:15.06	+28.35
58	Francisco Prat	Spain	2:15.79	+29.08
59	Frederick Patrick Piers de Westenholz	Great Britain	2:17.10	+30.39
60	Lotfollah Kia Shemshaki	Iran	2:17.11	+30.40
61	Kristinn Benediktsson	Iceland	2:17.86	+31.15
62	Peter Brockhoff	Australia	2:18.68	+31.97
63	Carlos Perner	Argentina	2:19.25	+32.54
64	Ovaness Meguerdonian	Iran	2:19.28	+32.57
65	Fayzollah Band Ali	Iran	2:21.05	+34.34
66	Francisco Cortes	Chile	2:22.08	+35.37
67	Oto Pustoslemšek	Yugoslavia	2:22.46	+35.75
68	Peter Wenzel	Australia	2:27.72	+41.01
69	Zeki Şamiloğlu	Turkey	2:28.76	+42.05
70	Nazih Geagea	Lebanon	2:30.24	+43.53
71	Osman Yüce	Turkey	2:32.11	+45.40
72	Dimitrios Pappos	Greece	2:35.52	+48.81
73	Konstantinos Karydas	Greece	2:35.89	+49.18
74	Muzaffer Demirhan	Turkey	2:41.42	+54.71
75	Michel Rahme	Lebanon	2:42.28	+55.57
76	Jean Keyrouz	Lebanon	2:44.51	+57.80
77	Jo Yeong-seok	South Korea	2:55.74	+69.03
78	Vasilios Makridis	Greece	2:57.79	+71.08
79	Abdurrahman Küçük	Turkey	3:07.63	+80.92
80	Sami Beyroun	Lebanon	3:14.65	+87.94
-	Wolfgang Bartels	United Team of Germany	DNF	-
-	Egon Zimmermann	Austria	DNF	-
-	Rod Hebron	Canada	DNF	-
-	Vasily Melnikov	Soviet Union	DNF	-
-	Javier Masana	Spain	DNF	-
-	Charles Westenholz	Great Britain	DNF	-
-	Jóhann Vilbergsson	Iceland	DNF	-
-	Juan Holz	Chile	DNF	-
-	Jimmy Heuga	United States	DQ	-
-	Buddy Werner	United States	DQ	-
-	Bengt-Erik Grahn	Sweden	DQ	-
-	Willy Bogner	United Team of Germany	DQ	-
-	Gary Battistella	Canada	DQ	-
-	Andrzej Dereziński	Poland	DQ	-
-	Charles Palmer-Tomkinson	Great Britain	DQ	-
-	Kim Dong-baek	South Korea	DQ	-
