= Alpine skiing at the 1964 Winter Olympics – Men's downhill =

Men's downhill at the IX Olympic Winter Games
- Alpine skiing
- Venue: Patscherkofel; Tyrol, Austria
- Date: 30 January 1964
- Competitors: 84 from 27 nations
- Winning time: 2:18.16

Medalists
1st place, gold medalist(s)		Egon Zimmermann	Austria
2nd place, silver medalist(s)		Léo Lacroix	France
3rd place, bronze medalist(s)		Wolfgang Bartels	United Team of Germany

Men's Downhill
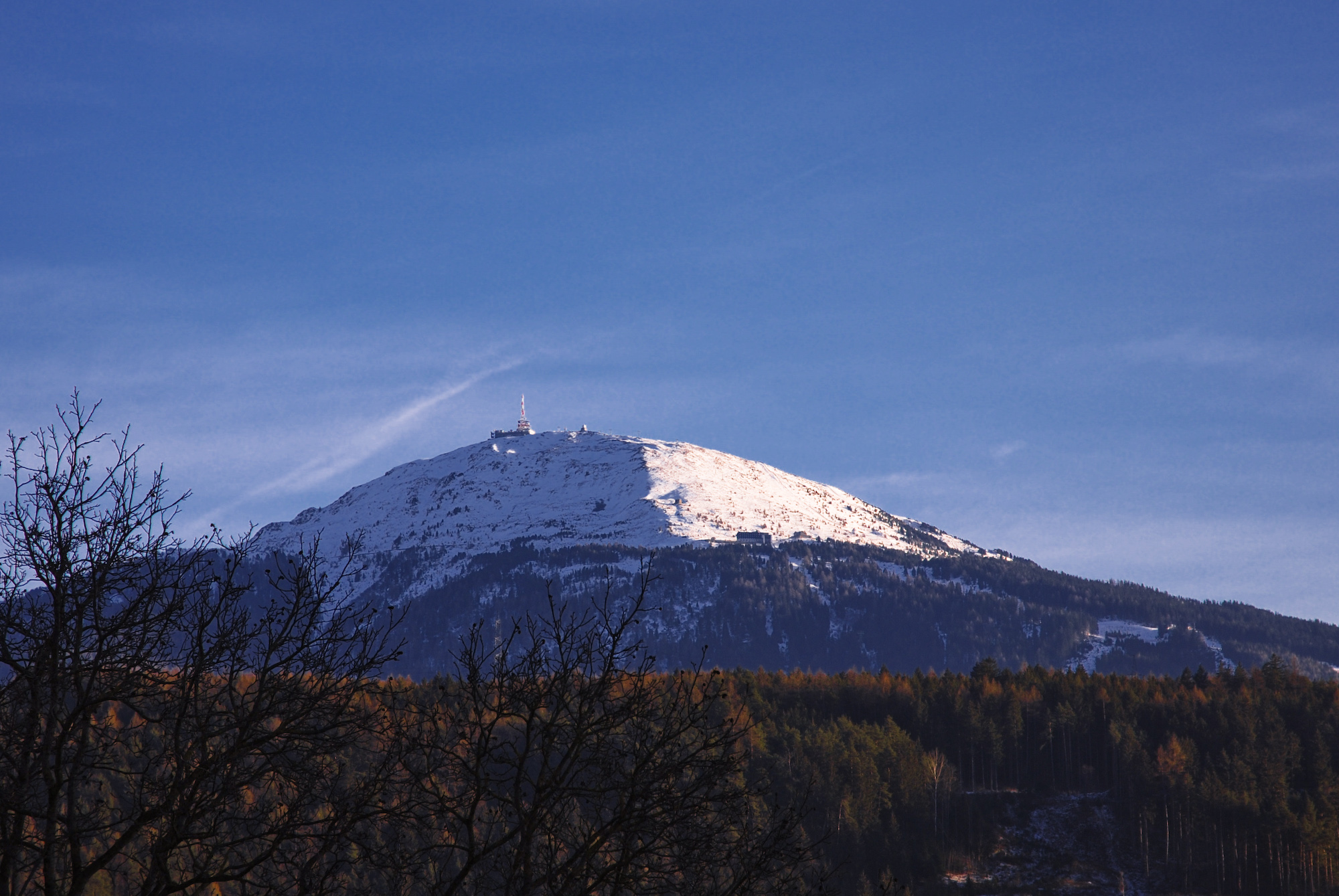
- Location: Patscherkofel
- Vertical: 867 m (2,844 ft)
- Top elevation: 1,952 m (6,404 ft)
- Base elevation: 1,085 m (3,560 ft)

The Men's downhill competition of the 1964 Winter Olympics at Innsbruck, Austria, was held at Patscherkofel on Thursday, 30 January. The defending world champion was Karl Schranz of Austria, and defending Olympic champion Jean Vuarnet of France had retired from competition.

The race course had a number of casualties during training runs, including the death of Ross Milne of Australia, which led to a label of "Course of Fear." Zimmermann was favored by many to win the downhill and to the delight of the Austrian fans he won by 0.74 seconds.

The starting gate was at an elevation of 1,952 m (6,404 ft), and the vertical drop was 867 m (2,844 ft). The course length was 3.120 km (1.94 mi) and Zimmerman's winning run resulted in an average speed of 81.297 km/h (50.5 mph), with an average vertical descent rate of 6.275 m/s (20.6 ft/s). Following the victory, Zimmerman was featured on the cover of Sports Illustrated in the United States.

A dozen years later in 1976, Franz Klammer raced on a slightly shorter course (by 100 meters (110 yards)) and shaved off more than a half-minute of Zimmerman's time to famously win the Olympic downhill.

== Results ==
Rank	Bib	Name	Country	Time	Difference
1st place, gold medalist(s)	7	Egon Zimmermann	Austria	2:18.16	—
2nd place, silver medalist(s)	4	Léo Lacroix	France	2:18.90	+0.74
3rd place, bronze medalist(s)	11	Wolfgang Bartels	United Team of Germany	2:19.48	+1.32
4	10	Jos Minsch	Switzerland	2:19.54	+1.38
5	3	Luggi Leitner	United Team of Germany	2:19.67	+1.51
6	6	Guy Périllat	France	2:19.79	+1.63
7	15	Gerhard Nenning	Austria	2:19.98	+1.82
8	24	Willy Favre	Switzerland	2:20.23	+2.07
9	14	Willy Bogner	United Team of Germany	2:20.72	+2.56
10	12	Heini Messner	Austria	2:20.74	+2.58
11	13	Karl Schranz	Austria	2:20.98	+2.82
12	5	Fritz Wagnerberger	United Team of Germany	2:21.03	+2.87
13	16	Dumeng Giovanoli	Switzerland	2:21.16	+3.00
14	20	Ni Orsi Jr.	United States	2:21.59	+3.43
15	27	François Bonlieu	France	2:21.71	+3.55
16	1	Billy Kidd	United States	2:21.82	+3.66
17	8	Buddy Werner	United States	2:22.05	+3.89
18	22	Georges Grünenfelder	Switzerland	2:22.69	+4.53
19	2	Ivo Mahlknecht	Italy	2:22.72	+4.56
20	21	Chuck Ferries	United States	2:23.00	+4.84
21	25	Paride Milianti	Italy	2:23.01	+4.85
22	30	Raimo Manninen	Finland	2:23.94	+5.78
23	19	Bruno Alberti	Italy	2:25.30	+7.14
24	63	Jerzy Woyna Orlewicz	Poland	2:25.88	+7.72
25	23	Jean-Guy Brunet	Canada	2:26.59	+8.43
26	49	Ulf Ekstam	Finland	2:27.31	+9.15
27	34	Martino Fill	Italy	2:27.33	+9.17
28	29	Gary Battistella	Canada	2:27.74	+9.58
29	32	Peter Lakota	Yugoslavia	2:27.82	+9.66
30	35	Rod Hebron	Canada	2:27.90	+9.74
31	46	Bengt-Erik Grahn	Sweden	2:29.29	+11.13
32	61	Jon Terje Øverland	Norway	2:29.74	+11.58
33	70	Hajime Tomii	Japan	2:30.02	+11.86
34	48	Peter Duncan	Canada	2:30.06	+11.90
35	40	Luis Viu	Spain	2:30.35	+12.19
36	76	Vasily Melnikov	Soviet Union	2:30.83	+12.67
37	45	Olle Rolén	Sweden	2:31.14	+12.98
38	43	Arild Holm	Norway	2:31.32	+13.16
39	37	Radim Koloušek	Czechoslovakia	2:31.34	+13.18
40	41	Bronisław Trzebunia	Poland	2:32.29	+14.13
41	60	Juan Garriga	Spain	2:32.85	+14.69
42	9	Jean-Claude Killy	France	2:32.96	+14.80
43	51	Javier Masana	Spain	2:33.52	+15.36
44	39	John Rigby	Great Britain	2:34.32	+16.16
45	62	Yoshiharu Fukuhara	Japan	2:34.55	+16.39
46	72	Tsuneo Noto	Japan	2:34.76	+16.60
47	75	Tally Monastyryov	Soviet Union	2:35.27	+17.11
48	55	Hans-Walter Schädler	Liechtenstein	2:35.84	+17.68
49	44	Andrzej Dereziński	Poland	2:35.89	+17.73
50	54	Charles Westenholz	Great Britain	2:36.12	+17.96
51	42	Fric Detiček	Yugoslavia	2:36.54	+18.38
52	38	August Wolfinger	Liechtenstein	2:37.25	+19.09
53	65	Josef Gassner	Liechtenstein	2:37.38	+19.22
54	69	Valery Shein	Soviet Union	2:38.13	+19.97
55	74	Andrej Klinar	Yugoslavia	2:39.79	+21.63
56	77	Charles Palmer-Tomkinson	Great Britain	2:39.97	+21.81
57	67	Yoshihiro Ohira	Japan	2:40.82	+22.66
58	53	Hernán Boher	Chile	2:41.67	+23.51
59	52	Prince Karim Aga Khan	Iran	2:42.59	+24.43
60	81	Petar Angelov	Bulgaria	2:43.32	+25.16
61	73	Simon Brown	Australia	2:44.07	+25.91
62	78	Oto Pustoslemšek	Yugoslavia	2:44.77	+26.61
63	86	Muzaffer Demirhan	Turkey	2:45.63	+27.47
64	83	Pedro Klempa	Argentina	2:47.07	+28.91
65	58	Lotfollah Kia Shemshaki	Iran	2:50.70	+32.54
66	68	Fayzollah Band Ali	Iran	2:52.44	+34.28
67	79	Nazih Geagea	Lebanon	2:55.34	+37.18
68	80	Peter Wenzel	Australia	2:55.58	+37.42
69	71	Ovaness Meguerdonian	Iran	2:57.10	+38.94
70	82	Osman Yüce	Turkey	3:03.66	+45.50
71	84	Zeki Şamiloğlu	Turkey	3:05.71	+47.55
72	87	Abdurrahman Küçük	Turkey	3:09.99	+51.83
73	89	Konstantinos Karydas	Greece	3:10.09	+51.93
74	90	Jean Keyrouz	Lebanon	3:40.44	+82.28
75	85	Michel Rahme	Lebanon	3:55.15	+96.99
76	88	Jorge Abelardo Eiras	Argentina	4:34.51	+136.35
77	64	Juan Holz	Chile	4:51.18	+153.02
-	47	Claudio Wernli	Chile	DQ	-
-	31	Rune Lindström	Sweden	DNF	-
-	33	Jeremy Bujakowski	India	DNF	-
-	50	Lars Olsson	Sweden	DNF	-
-	56	Jorge Rodríguez	Spain	DNF	-
-	57	Jonathan Taylor	Great Britain	DNF	-
-	91	Sami Beyroun	Lebanon	DNF	-
