= Chuenisbärgli =

Ski course in Switzerland

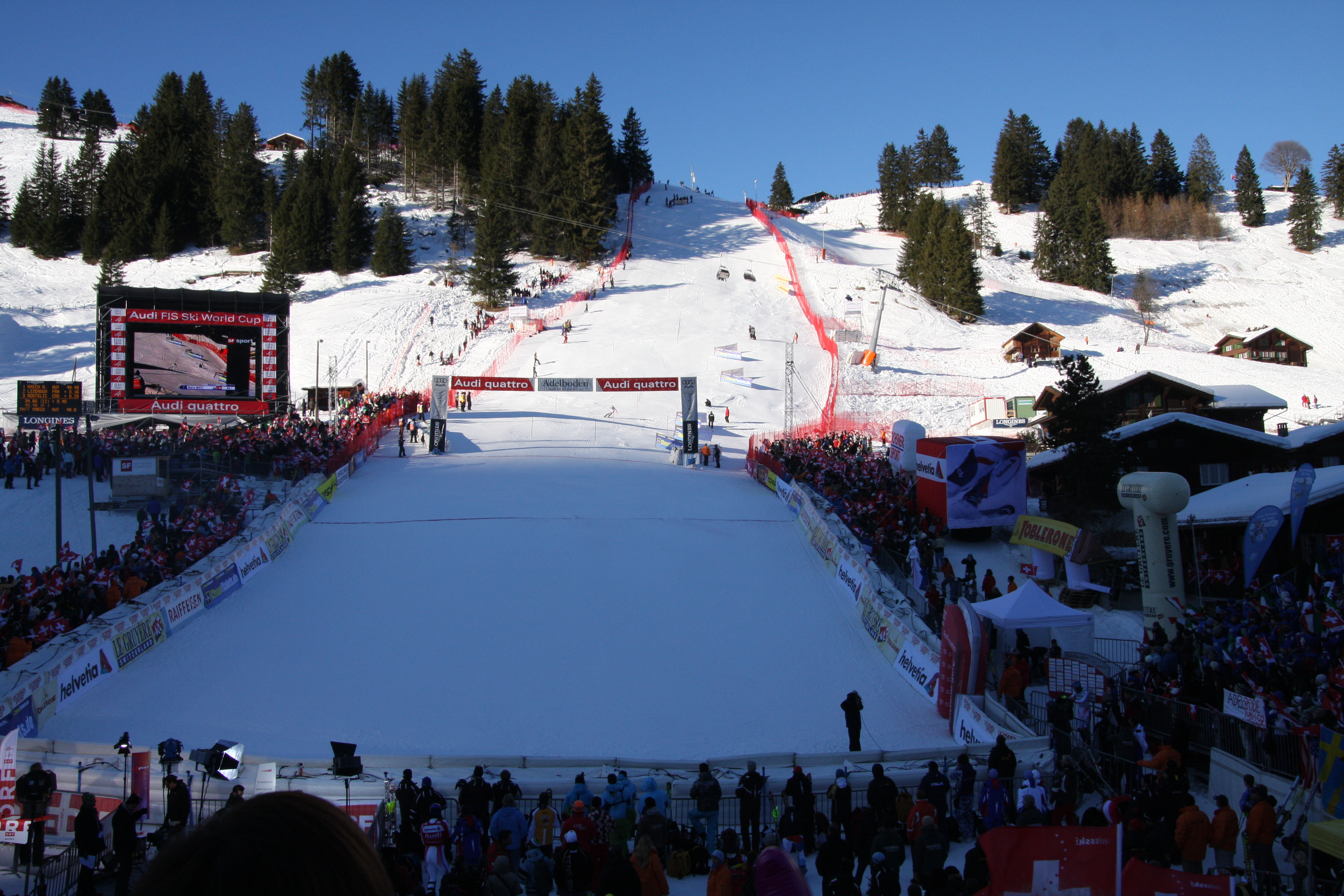
- Interactive map of Chuenisbärgli
- 46°28′20″N 7°32′47″E
- Location: Adelboden, Bernese Oberland, Switzerland
- Mountain: Chuenisbärgli
- Resort: 1955
- Member: Club5+
- Level: expert

Giant slalom
- Start: 1,730 m (5,676 ft) (AA)
- Finish: 1,294 m (4,245 ft)
- Vertical drop: 436 m (1,430 ft)
- Length: 1.430 km (0.89 mi)
- Max incline: 31 degrees (60%)
- Avg incline: 16.7 degrees (30%)
- Min incline: 5.7 degrees (10%)
- Most Wins (M): (Sweden) Ingemar Stenmark (5x) (Switzerland) Marco Odermatt (5x)

Slalom
- Start: 1,473 m (4,833 ft) (AA)
- Finish: 1,294 m (4,245 ft)
- Vertical drop: 179 m (587 ft)
- Length: 0.592 km (0.37 mi)
- Most Wins (M): (Austria) Marcel Hirscher (5x)

Chuenisbärgli is a World Cup technical ski course (and a hill) in Switzerland at Adelboden in Bernese Oberland, opened in 1955.

The track runs on natural terrain and is used only for annual World Cup competitions, traditionally in early January. It is one of the oldest and most classic slopes in the circuit.

It is considered the most prestigious giant slalom in the world and among the most demanding, along with Alta Badia and Kranjska Gora.

== History ==
In 1955 competition called "Internationalen Adelbodner Skitage" (International Adelboden Ski Days) started with slalom, giant slalom joined in 1958, with last slalom held in 1961.

In the early days of the World Cup, there was basically only one giant slalom, initially on two days (Monday 1st run / Tuesday 2nd run) and then both runs on Tuesday.

In 1967, giant slalom joined already in the premiere World Cup season and in 2000 slalom joined the competition after decades of break.

Since 1982 competition is being live broadcast. Competition was fully canceled in 1988, 1990, 1993 and 1994.

== World Cup ==
This course hosted total of 69 World Cup events for men (7th of all-time).

Ingemar Stenmark (SWE)	Marco Odermatt (SUI)	Marcel Hirscher (AUT)
265x	265x	245x
won record 5 GS		won record 5 SL

=== Men ===
No.	Type	Season	Date	Winner	Second	Third
International Adelboden Ski Days
—	SL	—	1955	(Switzerland) Martin Julen	(France) Adrien Duvillard	(Switzerland) Georges Schneider
—	SL	—	1956	(Japan) Chiharu Igaya	(United States) Tom Corcoran	(France) Adrien Duvillard
—	SL	—	1956	(Switzerland) Georges Schneider	(France) François Bonlieu	(France) Bernard Perret
—	SL	—	1957	(Switzerland) Georges Schneider	(France) Charles Bozon	(Italy) Gino Burrini
—	SL	—	1957	(Switzerland) Roland Bläsi	(Switzerland) Ruppert Sutter	(France) Charles Bozon
—	GS	—	1958	(Switzerland) Roger Staub	(Austria) Mathias Leitner	(France) Charles Bozon
—	SL	—	1958	(France) Charles Bozon	(Austria) Ernst Hinterseer	(Switzerland) Georges Schneider
—	GS	—	1959	(West Germany) Fritz Wagnerberger	(Austria) Gerhard Nenning	(West Germany) Ludwig Leitner
—	SL	—	1959	(West Germany) Sepp Behr	(United States) Bud Werner	(Switzerland) Georges Schneider
—	GS	—	1960	(West Germany) Ludwig Leitner	(Italy) Italo Pedroncelli	(Switzerland) Roger Staub
—	SL	—	1960	(West Germany) Ludwig Leitner	(Italy) Italo Pedroncelli	(Italy) Bruno Alberti
—	GS	—	1961	(East Germany) Eberhard Riedel	(Switzerland) Willi Forrer	(Italy) Italo Pedroncelli
—	SL	—	1961	(West Germany) Fritz Wagnerberger	(Switzerland) Daniel Gerber	Switzerland Adolf Mathis
	GS	—	1962	cancelled		
—	GS	—	1963	(Switzerland) Georges Grünenfelder	(France) Jean-Claude Killy	(France) Georges Mauduit
—	GS	—	1963	(France) Léo Lacroix	(West Germany) Fritz Wagnerberger	(West Germany) Ludwig Leitner
	GS	—	1964	cancelled		
—	GS	—	1965	(Switzerland) Edmund Bruggmann	(France) Léo Lacroix	(Switzerland) Beat von Allmen
—	GS	—	1965	(France) Léo Lacroix	(Italy) Ivo Mahlknecht	(Switzerland) Willy Favre
—	GS	—	1966	(United States) Billy Kidd	(Switzerland) Willy Favre	(Switzerland) Edmund Bruggmann
World Cup
3	GS	1967	9 January 1967	(France) Jean-Claude Killy	(Switzerland) Willy Favre	(France) Georges Mauduit
19	GS	1967/78	8 January 1968	(France) Jean-Claude Killy	(Switzerland) Edmund Bruggmann	(Switzerland) Stefan Kälin
40	GS	1968/79	6 January 1969	(France) Jean-Noël Augert	(France) Jean-Pierre Augert	(Austria) Karl Schranz
65	GS	1969/70	5 January 1970	(Austria) Karl Schranz	(West Germany) Sepp Heckelmiller	(Switzerland) Dumeng Giovanoli
97	GS	1970/71	18 January 1971	(France) Patrick Russel	(Italy) Gustav Thöni	(France) Henri Duvillard
122	GS	1971/72	24 January 1972	(Switzerland) Werner Mattle	(Switzerland) Adolf Rösti	(Italy) Gustav Thöni
142	GS	1972/73	15 January 1973	(Italy) Gustav Thöni	(Austria) Hans Hinterseer	(Norway) Erik Håker
170	GS	1973/74	21 January 1974	(Italy) Gustav Thöni	(Italy) Piero Gros	(Austria) Hans Hinterseer
188	GS	1974/75	13 January 1975	(Italy) Piero Gros	(Italy) Gustav Thöni	(Switzerland) Werner Mattle
218	GS	1975/76	12 January 1976	(Italy) Gustav Thöni	(Sweden) Ingemar Stenmark	(Switzerland) Engelhard Pargätzi
246	GS	1976/77	24 January 1977	(Switzerland) Heini Hemmi	(Sweden) Ingemar Stenmark	(Austria) Klaus Heidegger
273	GS	1977/78	17 January 1978	(Liechtenstein) Andreas Wenzel	(Sweden) Ingemar Stenmark	(Italy) Piero Gros
299	GS	1978/79	16 January 1979	(Sweden) Ingemar Stenmark	(Liechtenstein) Andreas Wenzel	(Switzerland) Jacques Lüthy
333	GS	1979/80	21 January 1980	(Sweden) Ingemar Stenmark	(Switzerland) Jacques Lüthy	(Switzerland) Joël Gaspoz
364	GS	1980/81	26 January 1981	(Sweden) Ingemar Stenmark	(Austria) Christian Orlainsky (Slovenia) Boris Strel	
396	GS	1981/82	19 January 1982	(Sweden) Ingemar Stenmark	(United States) Phil Mahre	(Switzerland) Max Julen
426	GS	1982/83	11 January 1983	(Switzerland) Pirmin Zurbriggen	(Switzerland) Max Julen	(Switzerland) Jacques Lüthy
463	GS	1983/84	10 January 1984	(Sweden) Ingemar Stenmark	(Austria) Hubert Strolz	(Switzerland) Pirmin Zurbriggen
505	GS	1984/85	15 January 1985	(Austria) Hans Enn	(Austria) Hubert Strolz	(Italy) Richard Pramotton
543	GS	1985/86	28 January 1986	(Italy) Richard Pramotton	(Italy) Marco Tonazzi	(Austria) Hubert Strolz
585	GS	1986/87	13 January 1987	(Switzerland) Pirmin Zurbriggen	(Luxembourg) Marc Girardelli	(Austria) Hubert Strolz
589	GS	1986/87	20 January 1987	(Switzerland) Pirmin Zurbriggen	(Switzerland) Joël Gaspoz	(Sweden) Ingemar Stenmark
	GS	1987/88	19 January 1988	cancelled		
650	GS	1988/89	17 January 1989	(Luxembourg) Marc Girardelli	(Norway) Ole Kristian Furuseth	(Italy) Alberto Tomba
	GS	1989/90	23 January 1990	cancelled		
714	GS	1990/91	15 January 1991	(Luxembourg) Marc Girardelli	(Italy) Alberto Tomba	(Austria) Rudolf Nierlich
746	GS	1991/92	22 January 1992	(Norway) Ole Kristian Furuseth	(Switzerland) Hans Pieren	(Luxembourg) Marc Girardelli
	GS	1992/93	19 January 1993	cancelled		
	GS	1993/94	18 January 1994	cancelled		
850	GS	1994/95	4 February 1995	(Italy) Alberto Tomba	(Slovenia) Jure Košir	(Norway) H. C. Strand Nilsen
881	GS	1995/96	16 January 1996	(Switzerland) Michael von Grünigen	(Switzerland) Urs Kälin	(Norway) Tom Stiansen
913	GS	1996/97	14 January 1997	(Norway) Kjetil André Aamodt	(Switzerland) Michael von Grünigen	(Austria) Andreas Schifferer
951	GS	1997/98	13 January 1998	(Austria) Hermann Maier	(Switzerland) Michael von Grünigen	(Switzerland) Paul Accola
988	GS	1998/99	12 January 1999	(Austria) Hermann Maier	(Norway) Kjetil André Aamodt	(Austria) Benjamin Raich
	GS	1999/00	19 February 2000	cancelled in first run due to heavy snowfall		
1032	SL	1999/00	20 February 2000	(Slovenia) Matjaž Vrhovnik	(Norway) Kjetil André Aamodt	(Austria) Mario Matt
1060	GS	2000/01	9 January 2001	(Austria) Hermann Maier	(Switzerland) Michael von Grünigen	(Sweden) Fredrik Nyberg
1093	GS	2001/02	5 January 2002	(Switzerland) Didier Cuche	(France) Frédéric Covili	(Sweden) Fredrik Nyberg
1094	SL	2001/02	6 January 2002	(United States) Bode Miller	(Croatia) Ivica Kostelić	(Slovenia) Mitja Kunc
1131	GS	2002/03	14 January 2003	(Austria) Hans Knauß	(Switzerland) Michael von Grünigen	(Norway) Kjetil André Aamodt
1178	GS	2003/04	7 February 2004	(Finland) Kalle Palander	(Italy) Massimiliano Blardone	(Austria) Christoph Gruber (Austria) Heinz Schilchegger
1179	SL	2003/04	8 February 2004	(Austria) Rainer Schönfelder	(United States) Bode Miller	(Austria) Benjamin Raich
1207	GS	2004/05	11 January 2005	(Italy) Massimiliano Blardone	(United States) Bode Miller	(Finland) Kalle Palander
1241	GS	2005/06	7 January 2006	(Austria) Benjamin Raich	(Sweden) Fredrik Nyberg	(Austria) Stephan Görgl (Finland) Kalle Palander
1242	SL	2005/06	8 January 2006	(Italy) Giorgio Rocca	(United States) Ted Ligety	(Austria) Benjamin Raich
1278	GS	2006/07	6 January 2007	(Austria) Benjamin Raich	(Italy) Massimiliano Blardone	(Norway) Aksel Lund Svindal
1279	SL	2006/07	7 January 2007	(Switzerland) Marc Berthod	(Austria) Benjamin Raich	(Austria) Mario Matt
1313	GS	2007/08	5 January 2008	(Switzerland) Marc Berthod	(Switzerland) Daniel Albrecht	(Austria) Hannes Reichelt
1314	SL	2007/08	6 January 2008	(Austria) Mario Matt	(Austria) Benjamin Raich	(Germany) Felix Neureuther
1353	GS	2008/09	10 January 2009	(Austria) Benjamin Raich	(Italy) Massimiliano Blardone	(Norway) Kjetil Jansrud
1354	SL	2008/09	11 January 2009	(Austria) Reinfried Herbst	(Austria) Manfred Pranger	(Germany) Felix Neureuther
	GS	2009/10	9 January 2010	cancelled in first run due to heavy fog		
1390	SL	2009/10	10 January 2010	(France) Julien Lizeroux	(Austria) Marcel Hirscher	(Croatia) Ivica Kostelić
1421	GS	2010/11	8 January 2011	(France) Cyprien Richard (Norway) Aksel Lund Svindal		(France) Thomas Fanara
1422	SL	2010/11	9 January 2011	(Croatia) Ivica Kostelić	(Austria) Marcel Hirscher	(Austria) Reinfried Herbst
1458	GS	2011/12	7 January 2012	(Austria) Marcel Hirscher	(Austria) Benjamin Raich	(Italy) Massimiliano Blardone
1459	SL	2011/12	8 January 2012	(Austria) Marcel Hirscher	(Croatia) Ivica Kostelić	(Italy) Stefano Gross
1504	GS	2012/13	12 January 2013	(United States) Ted Ligety	(Germany) Fritz Dopfer	(Germany) Felix Neureuther
1505	SL	2012/13	13 January 2013	(Austria) Marcel Hirscher	(Austria) Mario Matt	(Italy) Manfred Mölgg
1536	GS	2013/14	11 January 2014	(Germany) Felix Neureuther	(France) Thomas Fanara	(Austria) Marcel Hirscher
1537	SL	2013/14	12 January 2014	(Austria) Marcel Hirscher	(Sweden) André Myhrer	(Norway) Henrik Kristoffersen
1571	GS	2014/15	10 January 2015	(Austria) Marcel Hirscher	(France) Alexis Pinturault	(Norway) Henrik Kristoffersen
1572	SL	2014/15	11 January 2015	(Italy) Stefano Gross	(Germany) Fritz Dopfer	(Austria) Marcel Hirscher
	GS	2015/16	9 January 2016	cancelled due to bad weather		
1608	SL	2015/16	10 January 2016	(Norway) Henrik Kristoffersen	(Austria) Marcel Hirscher	(Russia) Aleksandr Khoroshilov
1652	GS	2016/17	7 January 2017	(France) Alexis Pinturault	(Austria) Marcel Hirscher	(Austria) Philipp Schörghofer
1653	SL	2016/17	8 January 2017	(Norway) Henrik Kristoffersen	(Italy) Manfred Mölgg	(Austria) Marcel Hirscher
1690	GS	2017/18	6 January 2018	(Austria) Marcel Hirscher	(Norway) Henrik Kristoffersen	(France) Alexis Pinturault
1691	SL	2017/18	7 January 2018	(Austria) Marcel Hirscher	(Austria) Michael Matt	(Norway) Henrik Kristoffersen
1727	GS	2018/19	12 January 2019	(Austria) Marcel Hirscher	(Norway) Henrik Kristoffersen	(France) Thomas Fanara
1728	SL	2018/19	13 January 2019	(Austria) Marcel Hirscher	(France) Clément Noël	(Norway) Henrik Kristoffersen
1763	GS	2019/20	11 January 2020	(Slovenia) Žan Kranjec	(Croatia) Filip Zubčić	(Norway) Henrik Kristoffersen (France) Victor Muffat-Jeandet
1764	SL	2019/20	12 January 2020	(Switzerland) Daniel Yule	(Norway) Henrik Kristoffersen	(Austria) Marco Schwarz
1717	GS	2020/21	8 January 2021	(France) Alexis Pinturault	(Croatia) Filip Zubčić	(Switzerland) Marco Odermatt
1718	GS	2020/21	9 January 2021	(France) Alexis Pinturault	(Croatia) Filip Zubčić	(Switzerland) Loïc Meillard
1719	SL	2020/21	10 January 2021	(Austria) Marco Schwarz	(Germany) Linus Straßer	(United Kingdom) Dave Ryding
1836	GS	2021/22	8 January 2022	(Switzerland) Marco Odermatt	(Austria) Manuel Feller	(France) Alexis Pinturault
1837	SL	2021/22	9 January 2022	(Austria) Johannes Strolz	(Austria) Manuel Feller	(Germany) Linus Straßer
1870	GS	2022/23	7 January 2023	(Switzerland) Marco Odermatt	(Norway) Henrik Kristoffersen	(Switzerland) Loïc Meillard
1871	SL	2022/23	8 January 2023	(Norway) Lucas Braathen	(Norway) Atle Lie McGrath	(Germany) Linus Straßer
1903	GS	2023/24	6 January 2024	(Switzerland) Marco Odermatt	(Norway) Aleksander Aamodt Kilde	(Croatia) Filip Zubčić
1904	SL	2023/24	7 January 2024	(Austria) Manuel Feller	(Norway) Atle Lie McGrath	(Austria) Dominik Raschner
1943	SL	2024/25	11 January 2025	(France) Clément Noël	(Brazil) Lucas Pinheiro Braathen	(Norway) Henrik Kristoffersen
1944	GS	2024/25	12 January 2025	(Switzerland) Marco Odermatt	(Switzerland) Loïc Meillard	(Italy) Luca De Aliprandini
1982	GS	2025/26	10 January 2026	(Switzerland) Marco Odermatt	(Brazil) Lucas Pinheiro Braathen	(France) Léo Anguenot
1983	SL	2025/26	11 January 2026	(France) Paco Rassat	(Norway) Atle Lie McGrath	(Norway) Henrik Kristoffersen

Not part Adelboden classic races. It replaced Garmisch-Partenkirchen (2021).

== Club5+ ==
In 1986, elite Club5 was originally founded by prestigious classic downhill organizers: Kitzbühel, Wengen, Garmisch, Val d’Isère and Val Gardena/Gröden, with goal to bring alpine ski sport on the highest levels possible.

Later over the years other classic longterm organizers joined the now named Club5+: Alta Badia, Cortina, Kranjska Gora, Maribor, Lake Louise, Schladming, Adelboden, Kvitfjell, St.Moritz and Åre.
