= 1964 in sports =

1964 in sports describes the year's events in world sport.

== Alpine skiing ==
- Men's Olympic gold medal:
  - Downhill: Egon Zimmermann, Austria
  - Slalom: Josef Stiegler, Austria
  - Giant Slalom: François Bonlieu, France
- Women's Olympic gold medal:
  - Downhill: Christl Haas, Austria
  - Slalom: Christine Goitschel, France
  - Giant Slalom: Marielle Goitschel, France
- FIS Alpine World Ski Championships –
  - Men's combined champion: Ludwig Leitner, Germany
  - Women's combined champion: Marielle Goitschel, France

== American football ==
- NFL Championship: the Cleveland Browns won 27–0 over the Baltimore Colts at Cleveland Stadium
- Cotton Bowl (1963 season):
  - The Texas Longhorns won 28–6 over the Navy Midshipmen to win the college football national championship
- Heisman Trophy – John Huarte QB, Notre Dame
- AFL Championship – Buffalo Bills win 20–7 over the San Diego Chargers

== Association football ==
=== England ===
- FA Cup final – West Ham United won 3–2 over Preston North End

=== International ===
- Spain beat the Soviet Union 2–1 to win the European Championship.
- In October during the celebration of the 1964 Summer Olympics FIFA gives the right to host the Football World Cup in 1970 to Mexico.

== Athletics ==
- March 6 – Tom O'Hara sets a new world record for the indoor mile run by completing it in 3 minutes and 56.4 seconds

== Australian rules football ==
- Victorian Football League
  - Melbourne wins the 68th VFL Premiership (Melbourne 8.16 (64) d Collingwood 8.12 (60))
  - Brownlow Medal awarded to Gordon Collis (Carlton)

== Baseball ==
- February 15 – death of Ken Hubbs (22), Chicago Cubs player, in an air crash just before the season began
- April 17 – The New York Mets play their first game at brand-new Shea Stadium and lose 4–3 to the Pittsburgh Pirates. Willie Stargell hits the first home run in the stadium's history, a second-inning solo shot off the Mets' Jack Fisher.
- June 21 – Jim Bunning of the Philadelphia Phillies pitched a perfect game in a 6–0 victory over the New York Mets.
- World Series – St. Louis Cardinals win 4 games to 3 over the New York Yankees. The Series MVP is pitcher, Bob Gibson of St. Louis.
- AL MVP – Brooks Robinson 3B, Baltimore Orioles
- NL MVP – Ken Boyer 3B, St. Louis Cardinals
- AL Rookie of the Year – Tony Oliva OF, Minnesota Twins
- NL Rookie of the Year – Dick Allen 3B, Philadelphia Phillies
- Cy Young Award – Dean Chance, Los Angeles Angels

== Basketball ==
- NCAA Men's Basketball Championship –
  - UCLA wins 97–83 over Duke
- Associated Press College Basketball Player of the Year – Gary Bradds F, Ohio State
- NBA Finals – Boston Celtics won 4 games to 1 over the San Francisco Warriors
- NBA MVP – Oscar Robertson G, Cincinnati Royals
- NBA Rookie of the Year – Jerry Lucas F, Cincinnati Royals

== Boxing ==
- February 25 in Miami Beach, Florida – Cassius Clay defeated Sonny Liston by TKO in the 7th round to win the World Heavyweight Championship.
- December 14 in Philadelphia, Joey Giardello won a 15-round decision over Rubin "Hurricane" Carter to win the World Middleweight title.

== Canadian football ==
- Grey Cup – B.C. Lions win 34–24 over the Hamilton Tiger-Cats

== Cycling ==
- Giro d'Italia won by Jacques Anquetil of France
- Tour de France – Jacques Anquetil of France
- UCI Road World Championships – Men's road race – Jan Janssen of Netherlands

== Field hockey ==
- Olympic Games (Men's Competition) in Tokyo, Japan
  - Gold Medal: India
  - Silver Medal: Pakistan
  - Bronze Medal: Australia

== Figure skating ==
- World Figure Skating Championships
  - Men's champion: Manfred Schnelldorfer, Germany
  - Ladies' champion: Sjoukje Dijkstra, Netherlands
  - Pair skating champions: Marika Kilius & Hans-Jürgen Bäumler, Germany
  - Ice dancing champions: Eva Romanová & Pavel Roman, Czechoslovakia

== Golf ==
Men's professional

- Masters Tournament – Arnold Palmer
- U.S. Open – Ken Venturi
- British Open – Tony Lema
- PGA Championship – Bobby Nichols
- PGA Tour money leader – Jack Nicklaus – $113,285

Men's amateur

- British Amateur – Gordon Clark
- U.S. Amateur – William C. Campbell

Women's professional

- Women's Western Open – Carol Mann
- LPGA Championship – Mary Mills
- U.S. Women's Open – Mickey Wright
- Titleholders Championship – Marilynn Smith
- LPGA Tour money leader – Mickey Wright – $29,800

== Harness racing ==
- United States Pacing Triple Crown races –
  1. Cane Pace – Race Time
  2. Little Brown Jug – Vicar Hanover
  3. Messenger Stakes – Race Time
- Ayres won the United States Trotting Triple Crown races –
  1. Hambletonian – Ayres
  2. Yonkers Trot – Ayres
  3. Kentucky Futurity – Ayres
- Australian Inter Dominion Harness Racing Championship –
  - Pacers: Minuteman

== Horse racing ==
- Northern Dancer becomes the first Canadian–bred horse to win the Kentucky Derby

Steeplechases

- Cheltenham Gold Cup – Arkle
- Grand National – Team Spirit

Flat races

- Australia – Melbourne Cup won by Polo Prince
- Canada – Queen's Plate won by Northern Dancer
- France – Prix de l'Arc de Triomphe won by Prince Royal
- Ireland – Irish Derby Stakes won by Santa Claus
- English Triple Crown Races:
  1. 2,000 Guineas Stakes – Baldric
  2. The Derby – Santa Claus
  3. St. Leger Stakes – Indiana
- United States Triple Crown Races:
  1. Kentucky Derby – Northern Dancer
  2. Preakness Stakes – Northern Dancer
  3. Belmont Stakes – Quadrangle

== Ice hockey ==
- Art Ross Trophy as the NHL's leading scorer during the regular season: Stan Mikita, Chicago Black Hawks
- Hart Memorial Trophy for the NHL's Most Valuable Player: Jean Beliveau, Montreal Canadiens
- Stanley Cup – Toronto Maple Leafs won 4–3 over the Detroit Red Wings
- World Hockey Championship –
  - Men's champion: Soviet Union defeated Sweden
- NCAA Men's Ice Hockey Championship – University of Michigan Wolverines defeat University of Denver Pioneers 6–3 in Denver, Colorado

== Lacrosse ==
- Guelph Mohawks win the first Castrol Cup.
- Vancouver Carlings win the Mann Cup.
- Oshawa Green Gaels win the Minto Cup.

== Rugby league ==
- 1963–64 Kangaroo tour of Great Britain and France
- 1964 New Zealand rugby league season
- 1964 NSWRFL season
- 1963–64 Northern Rugby Football League season / 1964–65 Northern Rugby Football League season

== Rugby union ==
- 70th Five Nations Championship series is shared by Scotland and Wales

== Snooker ==
- The World Snooker Championship is revived in a challenge format:
  - John Pulman beats Fred Davis 19–16
  - John Pulman beats Rex Williams 40–33

== Swimming ==
- February 29 – in Sydney, Australian swimmer Dawn Fraser sets a new world record in the women's 100m freestyle (long course) competition: 58.9 seconds.
- March 29 – Australia's Kevin Berry sets a new world record in the men's 200m butterfly (long course) at a meet in Sydney, clocking 2:06.9.
- July 12 – US swimmer Sharon Stouder breaks the world record in the women's 200m butterfly (long course) with one second, during a meet in Philadelphia, Pennsylvania, clocking 2:28.1.
- August 2 – Sharon Stouder once again breaks the world record in the women's 200m butterfly (long course), this time in Los Altos, California, clocking 2:26.4.
- October 18 – Kevin Berry breaks his own world record in the men's 200m butterfly (long course) on the last day of the swimming competition at the Summer Olympics in Tokyo, Japan, with a time of 2:06.6.

== Tennis ==
Australia

- Australian Men's Singles Championship – Roy Emerson (Australia) defeats Fred Stolle (Australia) 6–3, 6–4, 6–2
- Australian Women's Singles Championship – Margaret Smith Court (Australia) defeats Lesley Turner Bowrey (Australia) 6–3, 6–2

France

- French Men's Singles Championship – Manuel Santana (Spain) defeats Nicola Pietrangeli (Italy) 6–3, 6–1, 4–6, 7–5
- French Women's Singles Championship – Margaret Court (Australia) defeats Maria Bueno (Brazil) 5–7, 6–1, 6–2

UK

- Wimbledon Men's Singles Championship – Roy Emerson (Australia) defeats Fred Stolle (Australia) 6–4, 12–10, 4–6, 6–3
- Wimbledon Women's Singles Championship – Maria Bueno (Brazil) defeats Margaret Smith Court (Australia) 6–4, 7–9, 6–3

USA

- American Men's Singles Championship – Roy Emerson (Australia) defeats Fred Stolle (Australia) in straight sets 6–4, 6–2, 6–4
- American Women's Singles Championship – Maria Bueno (Brazil) defeats Carole Caldwell Graebner (USA) in straight sets 6–1, 6–0

Davis Cup

- 1964 Davis Cup – Australia 3–2 United States at Harold Clark Courts (clay) Cleveland, United States

== Volleyball ==
- Volleyball at the 1964 Summer Olympics won by USSR (men) and Japan (women)

== Yacht racing ==
- The New York Yacht Club retains the America's Cup as Constellation defeats British challenger Sovereign, of the Royal Thames Yacht Club, 4 races to 0

== Multi-sport events ==
- 1964 Summer Olympics held in Tokyo, Japan
  - United States wins the most gold medals (36) but the Soviet Union wins the most overall medals (96).
  - This Olympic opening ceremony is first time of live Olympic telecast program by geostationary communication satellite.
- 1964 Winter Olympics held in Innsbruck, Austria
  - USSR wins the most medals (25), and the most gold medals (11).
- Third Winter Universiade held in Špindleruv Mlýn, Czechoslovakia

== Awards ==
- Associated Press Male Athlete of the Year – Don Schollander, Swimming
- Associated Press Female Athlete of the Year – Mickey Wright, LPGA golf
- ABC's Wide World of Sports Athlete of the Year: Don Schollander, Swimming
- Sports Illustrated Sportsman of the Year – Ken Venturi – Golf
