= Jimmie Heuga =

American alpine skier

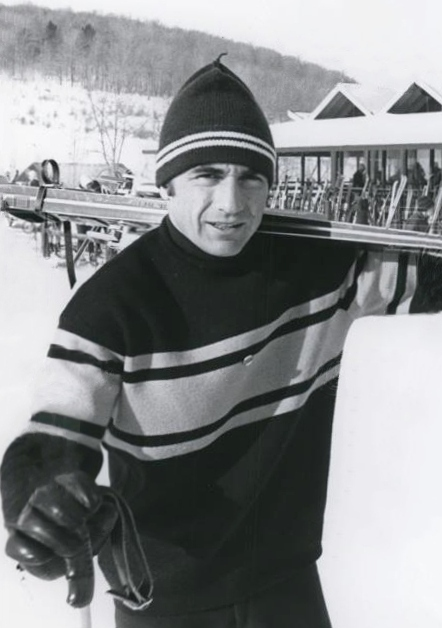
- Heuga in 1969

Personal information
- Full name: James Frederic Heuga
- Born: September 22, 1943 San Francisco, California, U.S.
- Died: February 8, 2010 (aged 66) Boulder, Colorado
- Height: 5 ft 6 in (1.68 m)

Sport
- Sport: Skiing
- Club: Colorado Buffaloes; Squaw Valley Ski Team
Medal record
Representing the United States
Olympic Games
Bronze medal – third place	1964 Innsbruck	Slalom

James Frederic Heuga (September 22, 1943 – February 8, 2010) was an American alpine ski racer who became one of the first two members of the U.S. men's team to win an Olympic medal in his sport. After multiple sclerosis prematurely ended his athletic career, he became an advocate of exercise and activity to combat the disease.

Born in San Francisco, California, Heuga grew up in Squaw Valley, California, where his father Pascal (1909–2011), a Basque immigrant from southwestern France, opened a grocery store in 1945 in Lake Forest and later operated the resort's cable car (1968–1988).

Heuga was on skis at age two and began to compete in the sport at age five; he appeared in a Warren Miller ski film at age nine. Heuga was named to the U.S. Ski Team in 1958, becoming the youngest man ever to make the squad as a fifteen-year-old.

He went to the University of Colorado in Boulder, where he was coached by Bob Beattie. A three-time letterman, Heuga won the NCAA championship in the slalom in 1963. With Beattie also leading the U.S. Ski Team, Heuga, along with fellow Buffaloes Buddy Werner and Bill Marolt (and future CU alumnus Billy Kidd), formed the squad's nucleus for the 1964 Winter Olympics. Both Kidd and Heuga became the first American men to win Olympic medals in Alpine skiing, respectively capturing silver and bronze in the slalom.

- finished sixth in the slalom and fourth in the combined at the 1966 World Championships at Portillo, Chile
- joined the pro racing tour following the 1968 Winter Olympics where he was 7th in the slalom and 10th in the giant slalom.
- was diagnosed with multiple sclerosis in 1970, which derailed his ski racing career at age 27.
- founded Can Do Multiple Sclerosis, formerly The Heuga Center for Multiple Sclerosis.
- the first NASTAR National Pacesetter (1968)

Heuga died on February 8, 2010, at Boulder Community Hospital in Boulder, due to complications from multiple sclerosis, exactly 46 years after he won his Olympic medal. The gold medalist in that slalom race, Pepi Stiegler, was also diagnosed with MS in 1993, as was Egon Zimmermann, the gold medalist in the downhill.

== World Championship results ==
Year	Age	Slalom	Giant slalom	Super-G	Downhill	Combined
1962	18	12	12	not run	25	5
1964	20	3	DSQ	not run	—	—
1966	22	6	13	not run	19	4
1968	24	7	10	not run	—	—

From 1948 through 1980, the Winter Olympics were also the World Championships for alpine skiing.
At the World Championships from 1954 through 1980, the combined was a "paper race" using the results of the three events (DH, GS, SL).

== Olympic results ==
Year	Age	Slalom	Giant slalom	Super-G	Downhill	Combined
1964	20	3	DSQ	not run	—	not run
1968	24	7	10	not run	—	not run
