= Spain at the 1964 Winter Olympics =

- IOC code: ESP (SPA used at these Games)
- NOC: Spanish Olympic Committee
- Website: www.coe.es (in Spanish)

in Innsbruck
- Competitors: 6 (men) in 1 sport
- Flag bearer: Jorge "Boto" Rodríguez
- Medals: Gold 0 Silver 0 Bronze 0 Total 0

Winter Olympics appearances (overview)
- 1936; 1948; 1952; 1956; 1960; 1964; 1968; 1972; 1976; 1980; 1984; 1988; 1992; 1994; 1998; 2002; 2006; 2010; 2014; 2018; 2022; 2026

Spain competed at the 1964 Winter Olympics in Innsbruck, Austria.

== Alpine skiing ==
Men

| Athlete | Event | Race | |
| Athlete | Event | Time | Rank |
|---|---|---|---|
| Jorge Rodríguez | Downhill | DNF | – |
| Javier Masana | Downhill | 2:33.52 | 43 |
| Juan Garriga | Downhill | 2:32.85 | 41 |
| Luis Viu | Downhill | 2:30.35 | 35 |
| Javier Masana | Giant Slalom | DNF | – |
| Francisco Prat | Giant Slalom | 2:15.79 | 58 |
| Juan Garriga | Giant Slalom | 2:03.85 | 38 |
| Luis Viu | Giant Slalom | 2:00.83 | 32 |

Men's slalom

| Athlete | Qualifying | | | | Final | | | | | |
| Athlete | Time 1 | Rank | Time 2 | Rank | Time 1 | Rank | Time 2 | Rank | Total | Rank |
|---|---|---|---|---|---|---|---|---|---|---|
| Luis Viu | 1:14.06 | 72 | 1:03.18 | 36 | did not advance | | | | | |
| Luis Sánchez | 1:02.40 | 51 | 1:00.56 | 26 | did not advance | | | | | |
| Javier Masana | 1:00.95 | 47 | 59.14 | 21 QF | 1:22.10 | 39 | 1:13.57 | 38 | 2:35.67 | 37 |
| Juan Garriga | 59.53 | 44 | DSQ | – | did not advance | | | | | |
