= Australia at the 1964 Winter Olympics =

- IOC code: AUS
- NOC: Australian Olympic Committee
- Website: www.olympics.com.au

in Innsbruck
- Competitors: 6 in 1 sport
- Medals: Gold 0 Silver 0 Bronze 0 Total 0

Winter Olympics appearances (overview)
- 1936; 1948; 1952; 1956; 1960; 1964; 1968; 1972; 1976; 1980; 1984; 1988; 1992; 1994; 1998; 2002; 2006; 2010; 2014; 2018; 2022; 2026

Australia competed at the 1964 Winter Olympics in Innsbruck, Austria. Six athletes were sent, and Australia competed only in Alpine skiing. Australia's best result was Christine Smith's 27th place in downhill.

The games were marred by tragedy due to the deaths of Australian skier Ross Milne and Kazimierz Kay-Skrzypecki a Polish-born British luge athlete during practice.

A minute's silence was given for them in the opening ceremony. Peter Brockhoff withdrew from the downhill event, saying "I simply cannot compete on this course where I lost my best friend". Australian reserve Peter Wenzel competed in the downhill along with Simon Brown.

== Investigation into Ross's death ==
An inquiry held by the organising committee said that Ross "caught an edge". Hugh Weir reported to the Australian Olympic Federation that

Because Ross Milne was only seventeen years of age, the question was raised at the [Innsbruck] IOC meeting as to whether inexperienced people were being sent to compete in ... snow sports which contain an element of danger.

Dr Blaxland said that he was wrong about his age (he was nineteen), and that the IOC was wrong to suggest he was inexperienced:

In our view Ross Milne was an extremely competent skier. He had competed in Australian championships at least four years before, and we considered him to be an experienced skier. He had been in Europe before ... His fall was not due to lack of skill on his part

Manager John Wagner said that Milne had found the path 150 metres ahead of him obscured by contestants congregating because the top part of the downhill course was overcrowded, and tried to slow down "on a spot which was not prepared for stopping or swinging". He argued that the accident might have been prevented by stricter management of the downhill course, which had a hundred racers on it. He also said that "any of the top skiers would probably have been in difficulty in a similar situation".

His brother Malcolm Milne competed in the 1968 and 1972 Winter Olympics. He said that the suggestion that skiers from Australia and New Zealand should not compete on downhill courses gave him motivation to prove that they were capable of doing so.

== Alpine skiing ==
Peter Brockhoff withdrew from the downhill event, but Simon Brown and Peter Wenzel competed in the event, with John Wagner saying "They wanted to prove Australians can handle the difficult downhill course".

Men

Athlete	Event	Qualifying				Final					
Athlete	Event	Run 1	Rank	Run 2	Rank	Run 1	Rank	Run 2	Rank	Total	Rank
Simon Brown	Downhill	—N/a								2:44.07	61
Simon Brown	Giant slalom	—N/a								2:12.61	51
Simon Brown	Slalom	1:06.83	58	1:05.88	44	did not advance					
Peter Wenzel	Downhill	—N/a								2:55.58	68
Peter Wenzel	Giant slalom	—N/a								2:27.72	68
Peter Wenzel	Slalom	1:08.68	63	1:10.25	49	did not advance					
Peter Brockhoff	Giant slalom	—N/a								2:18.68	62
Peter Brockhoff	Slalom	1:05.32	55	1:04.58	42	did not advance					

Women

Athlete	Event	Run 1		Run 2		Final/Total		
Athlete	Event	Time	Rank	Time	Rank	Time	Diff	Rank
Judy Forras	Downhill	—N/a				2:13.83	+18.44	42
Judy Forras	Giant slalom	—N/a				2:17.36	+25.12	40
Judy Forras	Slalom	did not finish						
Christine Smith	Downhill	—N/a				2:03.82	+8.43	27
Christine Smith	Giant slalom	—N/a				did not finish		
Christine Smith	Slalom	58.09	30	65.58	27	2:03.67	+33.81	28

== See also ==
- Australia at the Winter Olympics
