= Koloušek =

Koloušek (feminine Koloušková) is a Czech surname. Notable people include:

- Lenka Koloušková (born 1967), Czech sport shooter
- Radim Koloušek (born 1941), Czech alpine skier
- Václav Koloušek (born 1976), Czech footballer
