= Raimo Manninen =

Raimo Manninen may refer to:

- Raimo Manninen (athlete) (born 1955), Finnish retired javelin thrower
- Raimo Manninen (alpine skier) (1940–2009), Finnish alpine skier
