= Josef Stiegler =

Austrian alpine skier

Pepi Stiegler
Personal information
- Full name: Josef Stiegler
- Born: 20 April 1937 (age 89) Lienz, Tyrol, Austria

Skiing career
- Sport: Alpine skiing

Olympics
- Teams: 2 – (1960, 1964)
- Medals: 3 (1 gold)
Medal record
Men's alpine skiing
Representing Austria
Olympic Games &
World Championships
Gold medal – first place	1964 Innsbruck	Slalom
Silver medal – second place	1960 Squaw Valley	Giant Slalom
Bronze medal – third place	1964 Innsbruck	Giant Slalom

Josef "Pepi" Stiegler (born 20 April 1937 in Lienz, Austria) is a former alpine ski racer and Olympic gold medalist. He was a member of the Austrian national ski team during the late 1950s and early 1960s and was one of the world's premier racers. His two children were on the U.S. Ski Team: daughter Resi (b. 1985) was on the World Cup team and son Seppi (b. 1988) was on the Nor-Am circuit.

At the 1960 Winter Olympics of Squaw Valley, Stiegler won a silver medal in the giant slalom and took fifth place in the slalom. At the 1964 Winter Olympics of Innsbruck, he took the bronze medal in giant slalom at Axamer Lizum and then won the gold in slalom, edging out American medalists Billy Kidd and Jimmie Heuga. - He became "Austrian sportsman of the Year 1964".

Pepi Stiegler later made appearances at many ski events in the United States and wrote articles for ski magazines. In 1965 in western Wyoming, he became the first ski school director at Jackson Hole. He served in that capacity for 29 years, followed by eight more as ambassador of skiing, and stepped down in 2002 after 37 years with the resort.

Similar to Heuga, Stiegler was diagnosed with multiple sclerosis in 1993. Austrian teammate Egon Zimmermann, gold medalist in the 1964 Olympic downhill, also had MS.

At age 66, Stiegler earned a bachelor's degree in English literature from Montana State University in Bozeman in May 2003.

== Olympic results ==
Year	Age	Slalom	Giant slalom	Super-G	Downhill	Combined
1960	22	5	2	not run	15	not run
1964	26	1	3	not run	—	not run

From 1948 through 1980, the Winter Olympics were also the World Championships for alpine skiing.

== Video ==
- You Tube – Stiegler: The Style of A Champion (1974 film)
