= Peter Wenzel =

Peter Wenzel may refer to:

- Peter Wenzel (alpine skier) (born 1943), Australian Olympic alpine skier
- Peter Wenzel (weightlifter) (born 1952), German Olympic weightlifter
