= Bochatay =

Bochatay is a surname. Notable people with the surname include:

- Anne Bochatay (born 1968), Swiss ski mountaineer
- Fernande Bochatay (born 1946), Swiss alpine skier
- Jean Bochatay (born 1969), French ice hockey player
- Madeleine Bochatay, French alpine skier
- Nicolas Bochatay, Swiss speed skier
