= France at the 1964 Winter Olympics =

- IOC code: FRA
- NOC: French Olympic Committee

in Innsbruck, Austria 29 January–9 February 1964
- Competitors: 24 (15 men, 9 women) in 5 sports
- Flag bearer: Alain Calmat (Figure Skating)
- Medals Ranked 5th: Gold 3 Silver 4 Bronze 0 Total 7

Winter Olympics appearances (overview)
- 1924; 1928; 1932; 1936; 1948; 1952; 1956; 1960; 1964; 1968; 1972; 1976; 1980; 1984; 1988; 1992; 1994; 1998; 2002; 2006; 2010; 2014; 2018; 2022; 2026

France competed at the 1964 Winter Olympics in Innsbruck, Austria.

As Grenoble would be the host city for the following Winter Olympics, the flag of France was raised at the closing ceremony.

== Medalists ==
Medal	Name	Sport	Event
Gold	François Bonlieu	Alpine skiing	Men's giant slalom
Gold	Marielle Goitschel	Alpine skiing	Women's giant slalom
Gold	Christine Goitschel	Alpine skiing	Women's slalom
Silver	Léo Lacroix	Alpine skiing	Men's downhill
Silver	Christine Goitschel	Alpine skiing	Women's giant slalom
Silver	Marielle Goitschel	Alpine skiing	Women's slalom
Silver	Alain Calmat	Figure skating	Men's singles

== Alpine skiing ==
Men

Athlete	Event	Race	
Athlete	Event	Time	Rank
Jean-Claude Killy	Downhill	2:32.96	42
François Bonlieu	Downhill	2:21.71	15
Guy Périllat	Downhill	2:19.79	6
Léo Lacroix	Downhill	2:18.90	2nd place, silver medalist(s)
Léo Lacroix	Giant Slalom	1:51.26	11
Guy Périllat	Giant Slalom	1:50.75	10
Jean-Claude Killy	Giant Slalom	1:48.92	5
François Bonlieu	Giant Slalom	1:46.71	1st place, gold medalist(s)

Men's slalom

Athlete	Qualifying				Final					
Athlete	Time 1	Rank	Time 2	Rank	Time 1	Rank	Time 2	Rank	Total	Rank
Jean-Claude Killy	55.79	29	53.79	1 QF	DSQ	–	–	–	DSQ	–
Michel Arpin	54.07	13 QF	–	–	1:11.16	7	1:01.75	4	2:12.91	4
Guy Périllat	52.33	3 QF	–	–	1:17.00	28	59.33	1	2:16.33	12
François Bonlieu	51.23	1 QF	–	–	DSQ	–	–	–	DSQ	–

Women

Athlete	Event	Race 1		Race 2		Total	
Athlete	Event	Time	Rank	Time	Rank	Time	Rank
Marielle Goitschel	Downhill					2:00.77	10
Annie Famose	Downhill					1:59.86	9
Christine Terraillon	Downhill					1:59.66	8
Madeleine Bochatay	Downhill					1:59.11	6
Madeleine Bochatay	Giant Slalom					DNF	–
Annie Famose	Giant Slalom					1:53.89	5
Christine Goitschel	Giant Slalom					1:53.11	2nd place, silver medalist(s)
Marielle Goitschel	Giant Slalom					1:52.24	1st place, gold medalist(s)
Annie Famose	Slalom	45.13	7	DSQ	–	DSQ	–
Cécile Prince	Slalom	44.76	5	DSQ	–	DSQ	–
Christine Goitschel	Slalom	43.85	2	46.01	1	1:29.86	1st place, gold medalist(s)
Marielle Goitschel	Slalom	43.09	1	47.68	3	1:30.77	2nd place, silver medalist(s)

== Biathlon ==
Men

Event	Athlete	Time	Misses	Adjusted time ^{1}	Rank
20 km	Paul Romand	1'22:51.2	8	1'38:51.2	32

^{1} Two minutes added per miss.

== Cross-country skiing ==
Men

Event	Athlete	Race	
Event	Athlete	Time	Rank
15 km	Claude Legrand	56:05.8	37
15 km	Roger Pires	54:38.5	23
15 km	Victor Arbez	54:04.0	20
15 km	Félix Mathieu	54:02.2	19
30 km	Claude Legrand	1'38:40.5	25
30 km	Félix Mathieu	1'38:24.5	23
30 km	Roger Pires	1'37:45.5	21
30 km	Victor Arbez	1'36:50.5	20

Men's 4 × 10 km relay

Athletes	Race	
Athletes	Time	Rank
Victor Arbez; Félix Mathieu; Roger Pires; Paul Romand	2'26:31.4	6

== Figure skating ==
Men

Athlete	CF	FS	Points	Places	Rank
Philippe Pélissier	21	21	1573.8	189	23
Robert Dureville	14	19	1660.0	148	17
Alain Calmat	3	5	1876.5	22	2nd place, silver medalist(s)

Women

Athlete	CF	FS	Points	Places	Rank
Geneviève Burdel	29	27	1542.0	255	29
Nicole Hassler	5	4	1887.7	38	4

== Speed skating ==
Men

Event	Athlete	Race	
Event	Athlete	Time	Rank
500 m	André Kouprianoff	42.5	26
500 m	Raymond Fonvieille	41.4	10
1500 m	Raymond Fonvieille	2:22.6	43
1500 m	André Kouprianoff	2:15.8	22
10,000 m	André Kouprianoff	17:17.4	27

Women

Event	Athlete	Race	
Event	Athlete	Time	Rank
500 m	Françoise Lucas	48.9	18
1000 m	Françoise Lucas	1:41.3	19
1500 m	Françoise Lucas	2:36.4	22
