= Ni Orsi Jr. =

American alpine skier (born 1944)

Personal information
- Nationality: American
- Born: September 14, 1944 (age 81) Stockton, California, United States

Sport
- Sport: Alpine skiing

Ni Orsi Jr. (born September 14, 1944) is an American alpine skier. He competed in the men's downhill at the 1964 Winter Olympics.
