= Buddy Werner =

American alpine skier (1936–1964)

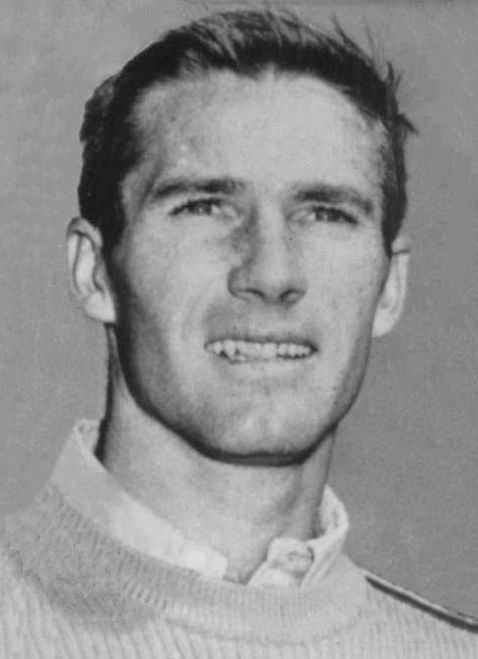
- circa 1964

Personal information
- Full name: Wallace Jerold Werner
- Born: February 26, 1936 Steamboat Springs, Colorado, United States
- Died: April 12, 1964 (aged 28) Trais Fleur slope, near St. Moritz, Switzerland
- Height: 5 ft 7 in (1.70 m)

Skiing career
- Sport: Alpine skiing
- Disciplines: Downhill, giant slalom, slalom, combined

Olympics
- Teams: 3 – (1956, 1960 (injured), 1964)
- Medals: 0

World Championships
- Teams: 5 – (1956, 1958, 1960 (injured), 1962, 1964)
- Medals: 0

Wallace Jerold "Buddy" Werner (February 26, 1936 – April 12, 1964) was an American alpine ski racer in the 1950s and early 1960s.

== Early years ==
Born and raised in Steamboat Springs, Colorado, Werner was the middle child of Ed "Pop" and Hazel Mae "Hazie" Werner. He and his siblings were accomplished skiers, and competed in both alpine and Nordic events on Howelsen Hill.

Werner raced for the University of Colorado in the mid-1950s, making the 1956 Olympic team in his sophomore year, joining his elder sister, Skeeter Werner.

== Ski racing ==
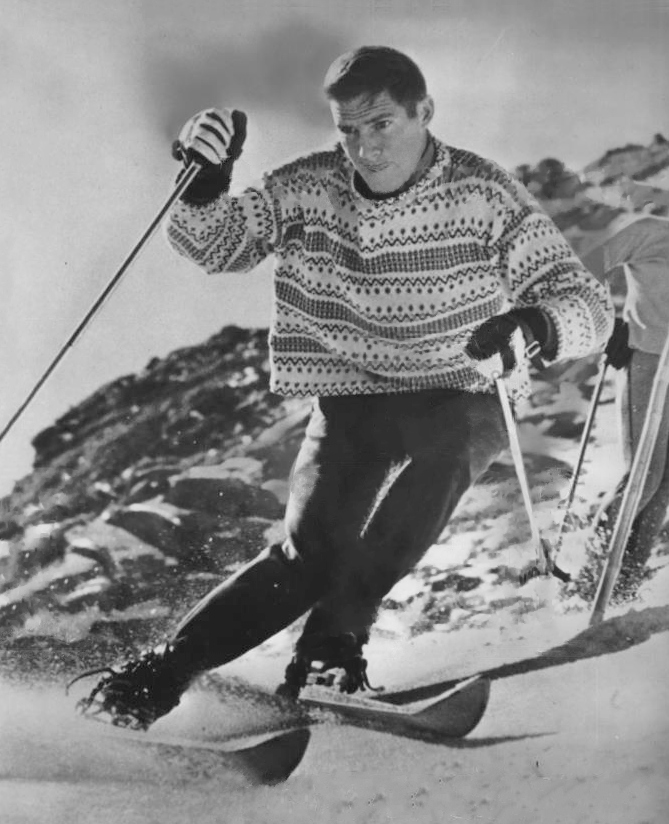
Werner in 1963

Werner was selected for the U.S. Olympic Team three times: 1956, 1960, and 1964. While still a teenager, he placed eleventh in the downhill in 1956 at Cortina d'Ampezzo, Italy, and was the only American to finish. His best chance to medal was in 1960 at Squaw Valley, but he broke his right leg while slalom training in Aspen in December 1959, just two months before the games.

Eleven months earlier at age 22, he was the first from outside Austria and Switzerland to win the famed Hahnenkamm downhill race in Kitzbühel, Austria. The only American to win since was Daron Rahlves in 2003, on a fog-shortened course. Three Canadians, Ken Read, Steve Podborski, and Todd Brooker, have won the race, and American runners-up were A. J. Kitt (1992), and Bode Miller (2008, 2011).

Werner finished fourth in the slalom at the 1958 World Championships in Austria at Bad Gastein. He took fifth in the giant slalom, and was challenging Toni Sailer for the combined title with only the downhill event remaining. In contention for a medal in the downhill, Werner fell a few seconds before the finish. He lost a ski and a pole and eventually crossed the finish line, but was fourteen seconds back in a distant 37th place, which knocked him down to seventh in the combined standings. (From 1954 through 1980, the combined event at the world championships was a "paper race" which used the results of the three events, a pseudo-"overall" title.)

After missing the 1960 Winter Olympics due to injury, Werner returned to the world championships in 1962 at Chamonix, France. He again finished fifth in the giant slalom, and also eighth in the downhill, but did not finish the second run of slalom, which knocked him out of the combined. A few weeks earlier, he won the Lauberhorn combined event at Wengen, Switzerland.

At the 1964 Olympics at Innsbruck, Werner placed eighth in the slalom at Axamer Lizum, behind medalist teammates Billy Kidd (silver) and Jimmie Heuga (bronze), and seventeenth in the downhill at Patscherkofel. Although Werner never won an Olympic or World Championship medal, he is considered the first world-class ski racer from the U.S. and excelled in all three alpine disciplines.

== World Championship results ==
Year	Age	Slalom	Giant Slalom	Super-G	Downhill	Combined
1956	19	DNF1	21	not run	11	—
1958	21	4	5	not run	37	7
1960 ^	23	—	—	not run	—	—
1962	25	DNF2	5	not run	8	—
1964	27	8	DSQ	not run	17	—

From 1948 through 1980, the Winter Olympics were also the World Championships for alpine skiing.
At the World Championships from 1954 through 1980, the combined was a "paper race" using the results of the three events (DH, GS, SL).

^ injured in 1960 (broken leg), did not compete

== Death ==
Following the Olympics, the 1964 racing season concluded March 22 at the U.S. Alpine Championships in Winter Park, Colorado, and Werner retired from competition at age 28 and started a new career. Three weeks later he was in Switzerland with more than a dozen others to film the ski fashion movie Ski Fascination for Willy Bogner. Werner and German racer (and Olympic medalist) Barbi Henneberger, age 23, were caught in an avalanche on the Trais Fleur slope, near St. Moritz. Both skied out of the first avalanche, but were caught up in another; their bodies were found hours later, deaths attributed to suffocation.

Bogner, 22, and Henneberger were to be engaged that summer; he was tried by a Swiss court for homicide by negligence. Initially acquitted, the prosecution later won a conviction on appeal, of manslaughter by negligence, and Bogner received a two-month suspended sentence.

After a memorial service in Denver, Werner's funeral in Steamboat Springs overflowed the United Methodist Church, and he was buried at the city cemetery at the base of Howelson Hill. Coach Bob Beattie and teammates from the U.S. Ski Team were pallbearers.

== Personal ==
In 1961, Werner married Vanda Norgren, the daughter of Denver industrialist C.A. Norgren, and they had no children. He was scheduled to complete his bachelor's degree at the University of Colorado in June 1964, and co-owned a ski shop with his sister Skeeter at the base of the fledgling Storm Mountain ski area, which later became Steamboat Ski Resort.

In the mid-1950s, Werner was romantically linked to ski racer Jill Kinmont, and was played by actor Bill Vint in 1975's The Other Side of the Mountain, a biography of Kinmont's life that focused on her tragic injury in January 1955 which led to their eventual breakup. They had met the previous year at a U.S. training camp in Sun Valley, Idaho.

== Legacy ==
Werner was posthumously inducted into the National Ski Hall of Fame later that year. Storm Mountain, the primary mountain of the new Steamboat Ski Resort in his hometown, was renamed Mount Werner in his honor in February 1965. "Buddy's Run," which starts at the top of Storm Peak on Mount Werner, features a statue honoring Werner near the beginning of the run. He was inducted into the Colorado Ski and Snowboard Hall of Fame in 1977.

The city library in Steamboat Springs was named for Werner in 1967. The Buddy Werner League is a national youth ski racing program, similar to Little League for baseball.
