= Manuel Mena =

Argentine alpine skier (born 1946)

Personal information
- Born: 9 February 1946 (age 79); San Carlos de Bariloche, Argentina

Sport
- Sport: Alpine skiing

Manuel Mena (born 9 February 1946) is an Argentine alpine skier. He competed in the men's slalom at the 1964 Winter Olympics.
