= Georges Grünenfelder =

Swiss alpine skier (born 1937)

Personal information
- Nationality: Swiss
- Born: 2 January 1937 Sankt Gallen, Switzerland
- Died: 21 March 2016 (aged 79)

Sport
- Sport: Alpine skiing

Georges Grünenfelder (2 January 1937 – 21 March 2016) was a Swiss alpine skier. He competed in the men's downhill at the 1964 Winter Olympics.
