= Félix Mathieu =

French cross-country skier (born 1937)

Personal information
- Nationality: French
- Born: 15 October 1937 (age 87); Bellecombe, France

Sport
- Sport: Cross-country skiing

Félix Mathieu (born 15 October 1937) is a French cross-country skier. He competed at the 1964 Winter Olympics and the 1968 Winter Olympics.
