= Claudio Wernli =

Chilean alpine skier (born 1942)

Personal information
- Born: 21 July 1942 (age 83) Santiago, Chile

Sport
- Sport: Alpine skiing

Claudio Wernli (born 21 July 1942) is a Chilean alpine skier. He competed in two events at the 1964 Winter Olympics.
