= Madeleine Bochatay =

French alpine skier

Personal information
- Nationality: French
- Born: 2 January 1944 (age 82) Saint-Gervais, France

Sport
- Sport: Alpine skiing

Madeleine Bochatay (born 2 January 1944) is a French alpine skier. She competed in two events at the 1964 Winter Olympics.
