= Martino Fill =

Italian alpine skier (born 1939)

Personal information
- Nationality: Italian
- Born: 5 March 1939 (age 86); Castelrotto, Italy

Sport
- Sport: Alpine skiing

Martino Fill (born 5 March 1939) is an Italian alpine skier. He competed in two events at the 1964 Winter Olympics.
