= Francisco Prat (skier) =

Spanish alpine skier (born 1944)

Personal information
- Nationality: Spanish
- Born: 27 January 1944 (age 81)

Sport
- Sport: Alpine skiing

Francisco Prat (born 27 January 1944) is a Spanish alpine skier. He competed in the men's giant slalom at the 1964 Winter Olympics.
