= Yoshihiro Ohira =

Japanese skier (born 1940)

Personal information
- Nationality: Japanese
- Born: 9 September 1940 (age 86) Otaru, Hokkaido, Japan

Sport
- Sport: Alpine skiing

Yoshihiro Ohira (born 9 September 1940) is a Japanese alpine skier. He competed in two events at the 1964 Winter Olympics.
