= Wolfgang Bartels (skier) =

German alpine skier (1940–2007)

Medal record

Men's alpine skiing

Representing Germany

Olympic Games
Bronze medal – third place	1964 Innsbruck	Downhill

Wolfgang Bartels (14 July 1940 – 6 February 2007) was a German alpine skier who competed for the United Team of Germany in the 1964 Winter Olympics.

He was born in Bischofswiesen and died in Ramsau bei Berchtesgaden.

In 1964 he won the bronze medal in the Alpine downhill event. In the slalom competition he finished ninth. He also competed in the giant slalom contest but did not finish the race.
