= Kim Dong-baek =

South Korean alpine skier (born 1941)

Personal information
- Nationality: South Korean
- Born: 18 August 1941 (age 83); Gangwon, South Korea

Sport
- Sport: Alpine skiing

Kim Dong-baek (born 18 August 1941) is a South Korean alpine skier. He competed in two events at the 1964 Winter Olympics.
