= Jo Yeong-seok =

South Korean skier (born 1934)

Personal information
- Nationality: South Korean
- Born: 1 January 1934 (age 92) North Gyeongsang, Korea
- Education: Waseda University

Korean name
- Hangul: 조영석
- Hanja: 趙永石
- RR: Jo Yeongseok
- MR: Cho Yŏngsŏk

Sport
- Sport: Alpine skiing

Young S. Cho (born 1 January 1934), also known as Jo Yeong-seok, is a South Korean alpine skier. He competed in two events at the 1964 Winter Olympics.

He attended Waseda University in Tokyo, Japan. He participated in the university division of the 42nd (1961), 43rd (1962), and 44th (1963) Winter Korean National Sports Festivals along with a team of fellow Koreans living in Japan.

He moved to the United States in 1966, where he established a textile manufacturing business. By 1975 he had become the president of the Colorado Korean Association. He is also a member of the Rotary Club of Denver. He is a board member of the Colorado Symphony Orchestra. From 2021 to 2024, he organized golf tournaments to provide scholarships to children of employees at Pinehurst Country Club, where he had been a member for five decades.
