= Anton Šoltýs =

Slovak alpine skier (1937–2022)

Personal information
- Nationality: Slovak
- Born: 30 April 1937; Kežmarok, Czechoslovakia
- Died: 12 December 2022 (aged 85); Bratislava, Slovakia

Sport
- Sport: Alpine skiing

Anton Šoltýs (30 April 1937 – 12 December 2022) was a Slovak alpine skier. He competed in two events at the 1964 Winter Olympics.

Šoltýs died on 12 December 2022, at the age of 85.
