= Árni Sigurðsson (alpine skier) =

Icelandic alpine skier (born 1941)

Personal information
- Nationality: Icelandic
- Born: 18 April 1941 (age 83); Ísafjörður, Kingdom of Iceland

Sport
- Sport: Alpine skiing

Árni Sigurðsson (born 18 April 1941) is an Icelandic former alpine skier. He competed in two events at the 1964 Winter Olympics.
