= Greece at the 1964 Winter Olympics =

- IOC code: GRE
- NOC: Committee of the Olympic Games

in Innsbruck Austria
- Competitors: 3 (men) in 1 sport
- Flag bearer: Dimitrios Pappos
- Medals: Gold 0 Silver 0 Bronze 0 Total 0

Winter Olympics appearances (overview)
- 1936; 1948; 1952; 1956; 1960; 1964; 1968; 1972; 1976; 1980; 1984; 1988; 1992; 1994; 1998; 2002; 2006; 2010; 2014; 2018; 2022; 2026

Greece competed at the 1964 Winter Olympics in Innsbruck, Austria. The nation returned to the Winter Games after they missed in the 1960 Winter Olympics.

== Alpine skiing ==
Men

| Athlete | Event | Race | |
| Athlete | Event | Time | Rank |
|---|---|---|---|
| Konstantinos Karydas | Downhill | 3:10.09 | 73 |
| Vasilios Makridis | Giant Slalom | 2:57.79 | 78 |
| Konstantinos Karydas | Giant Slalom | 2:35.89 | 73 |
| Dimitrios Pappos | Giant Slalom | 2:35.52 | 72 |

Men's slalom

| Athlete | Qualifying | | | | Final | | | | | |
| Athlete | Time 1 | Rank | Time 2 | Rank | Time 1 | Rank | Time 2 | Rank | Total | Rank |
|---|---|---|---|---|---|---|---|---|---|---|
| Dimitrios Pappos | 1:42.76 | 83 | DSQ | – | did not advance | | | | | |
| Konstantinos Karydas | 1:31.51 | 82 | 1:37.46 | 55 | did not advance | | | | | |
| Vasilios Makridis | 1:19.70 | 77 | 1:40.27 | 56 | did not advance | | | | | |
