= Claude Legrand (skier) =

French cross-country skier (born 1941)

Personal information
- Nationality: French
- Born: 16 August 1941 (age 83); Lamoura, France

Sport
- Sport: Cross-country skiing

Claude Legrand (born 16 August 1941) is a French cross-country skier. He competed at the 1964 Winter Olympics and the 1968 Winter Olympics.
