= Hajime Tomii =

Japanese alpine skier (born 1940)

Personal information
- Nationality: Japanese
- Born: 11 December 1940 (age 84); Nozawaonsen, Japan

Sport
- Sport: Alpine skiing

Hajime Tomii (富井 一, Tomii Hajime, born 11 December 1940) is a Japanese alpine skier. He competed in three events at the 1964 Winter Olympics.
