= Bronisław Trzebunia =

Polish alpine skier (born 1941)

Personal information
- Nationality: Polish
- Born: 15 September 1941 (age 83); Zakopane, Poland

Sport
- Sport: Alpine skiing

Bronisław Trzebunia (born 15 September 1941) is a Polish alpine skier. He competed in three events at the 1964 Winter Olympics.
