= Jorge Rodríguez (alpine skier) =

Spanish alpine skier (born 1945)

Personal information
- Full name: Jorge Rodríguez Girona
- Nickname: Boto
- Nationality: Spanish
- Born: 9 March 1945 (age 81) Burgos, Spain

Sport
- Sport: Alpine skiing

Jorge "Boto" Rodríguez Girona (born 9 March 1945) is a Spanish alpine skier. He competed at the 1964 Winter Olympics and the 1968 Winter Olympics.

Rodríguez was the flag bearer in the opening ceremony of the 1964 Winter Olympics.

== Olympic participation ==
At the 1964 Winter Olympics in Innsbruck, Rodríguez competed in the men's downhill event but did not finish the race. Four years later, at the 1968 Winter Olympics in Grenoble, he participated in the men's giant slalom, finishing 59th with a combined time of 3 minutes and 57.24 seconds.

For several decades, Rodríguez was also incorrectly listed as a participant in the men's slalom at the 1968 Games. Research conducted by Olympic historian Fernando Arrechea in 2012 established that the skier who competed in that event was Secundino Rodríguez Rodríguez, known as Cundi. The identification was subsequently confirmed by the athletes themselves, correcting a longstanding error in the official results and historical records.
