= Jonathan Taylor (alpine skier) =

British alpine skier (born 1943)

Jonathan Jeremy Kirwan Taylor (born 12 October 1943 in London) is a British former alpine skier who competed in the 1964 Winter Olympics. son of Charles Taylor. Taylor attended Eton College and then read law at St. Edmund Hall, Oxford and was captain of the Oxford University Skiing Club in 1964-65. Taylor qualified as a barrister in 1968. He married Victoria Mary Caroline McLaren, daughter of John Francis McLaren.
