= Valery Shein =

Soviet alpine skier (born 1945)

Personal information
- Nationality: Soviet
- Born: 23 November 1945 (age 79); Perm, Soviet Union

Sport
- Sport: Alpine skiing

Valery Shein (born 23 November 1945) is a Soviet alpine skier. He competed in three events at the 1964 Winter Olympics.
