= Lars Olsson (alpine skier) =

Swedish alpine skier (born 1944)

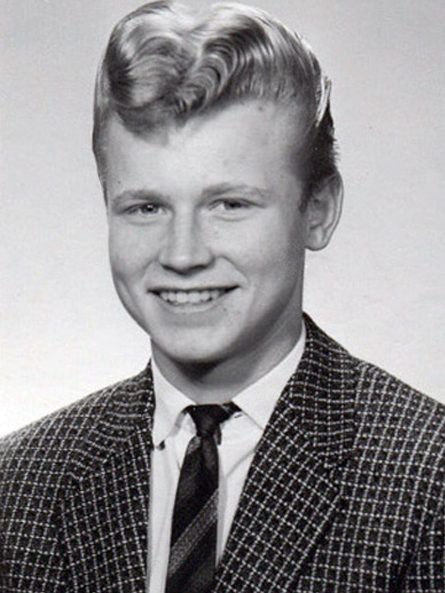

Personal information
- Full name: Lars Inge Olsson
- Born: 16 November 1944 (age 80); Falun, Sweden

Sport
- Sport: Alpine skiing
- Club: IFK Borlänge

Lars Inge Olsson (born 16 November 1944) is a Swedish former alpine skier. He competed in the slalom and downhill evenets at the 1964 Winter Olympics and in the giant slalom at the 1968 Winter Olympics.
