= Pedro Klempa =

Argentine alpine skier (born 1941)

Personal information
- Nationality: Argentine
- Born: 23 November 1941 (age 83); Vienna, Austria

Sport
- Sport: Alpine skiing

Pedro Klempa (born 23 November 1941) is an Argentine alpine skier. He competed in three events at the 1964 Winter Olympics.
