= Luis Sánchez (alpine skier) =

Spanish skier (born 1940)

Personal information
- Nationality: Spanish
- Born: 12 September 1940 (age 84); Madrid, Spain

Sport
- Sport: Alpine skiing

Luis Sánchez (born 12 September 1940) is a Spanish alpine skier. He competed at the 1960 Winter Olympics and the 1964 Winter Olympics. Sánchez was the flag bearer for Spain in the opening ceremony of the 1960 Winter Olympics.
