= Andrzej Dereziński =

Polish alpine skier (born 1944)

Personal information
- Nationality: Polish
- Born: 24 April 1944 (age 80); Poronin, Poland

Sport
- Sport: Alpine skiing

Andrzej Dereziński (born 24 April 1944) is a Polish alpine skier. He competed in three events at the 1964 Winter Olympics.
