= Jerzy Woyna Orlewicz =

Polish alpine skier (born 1943)

Personal information
- Nationality: Polish
- Born: 14 May 1943 (age 81); Zakopane, Poland

Sport
- Sport: Alpine skiing

Jerzy Woyna Orlewicz (born 14 May 1943) is a Polish alpine skier. He competed in three events at the 1964 Winter Olympics.
