= Juan Holz =

Chilean alpine skier (born 1943)

Personal information
- Born: 21 November 1943 (age 82) Santiago, Chile

Sport
- Sport: Alpine skiing

Juan Holz (born 21 November 1943) is a Chilean alpine skier. He competed in three events at the 1964 Winter Olympics.
