= Tally Monastyryov =

Soviet alpine skier (1939–2011)

Personal information
- Nationality: Soviet
- Born: 7 November 1939; Moscow, Soviet Union
- Died: 31 January 2011 (aged 71); Erzurum, Turkey

Sport
- Sport: Alpine skiing

Tally Monastyryov (7 November 1939 – 31 January 2011) was a Soviet alpine skier. He competed in three events at the 1964 Winter Olympics.
