= Per Martin Sunde =

Norwegian alpine skier (born 1944)

Personal information
- Born: 23 February 1944 (age 81); Oslo, Norway

Sport
- Sport: Alpine skiing

Per Martin Sunde (born 23 February 1944) is a Norwegian alpine skier. He was born in Oslo. He participated at the 1964 Winter Olympics in Innsbruck, where he competed in slalom and giant slalom.

He was Norwegian champion in slalom in 1961 and in 1964.
