= Yoshinari Kida =

Japanese alpine skier (born 1943)

Personal information
- Nationality: Japanese
- Born: 29 September 1943 (age 83) Tokyo, Japan

Sport
- Sport: Alpine skiing

Yoshinari Kida (気田 義也, Kida Yoshinari; born 29 September 1943) is a Japanese alpine skier. He competed at the 1964 Winter Olympics and the 1968 Winter Olympics.
