= Josef Minsch =

Swiss alpine skier (1941–2008)

Josef "Jos" Minsch (June 23, 1941 – June 7, 2008) was a Swiss alpine skier who competed in the 1964 Winter Olympics and the 1968 Winter Olympics. He was born and died in Klosters. In 1964 he finished fourth in the downhill contest and ninth in the giant slalom competition. Four years later he finished 14th in the downhill event.
