= Fritz Wagnerberger =

German skier (1937–2010)

Personal information
- Nationality: German
- Born: 14 June 1937 Traunstein, Germany
- Died: 23 March 2010 (aged 72) Traunstein, Germany

Sport
- Sport: Alpine skiing

Fritz Wagnerberger (14 June 1937 – 23 March 2010) was a German alpine skier. He competed at the 1960 Winter Olympics and the 1964 Winter Olympics.
