= Egon Zimmermann =

Austrian alpine skier (1939–2019)

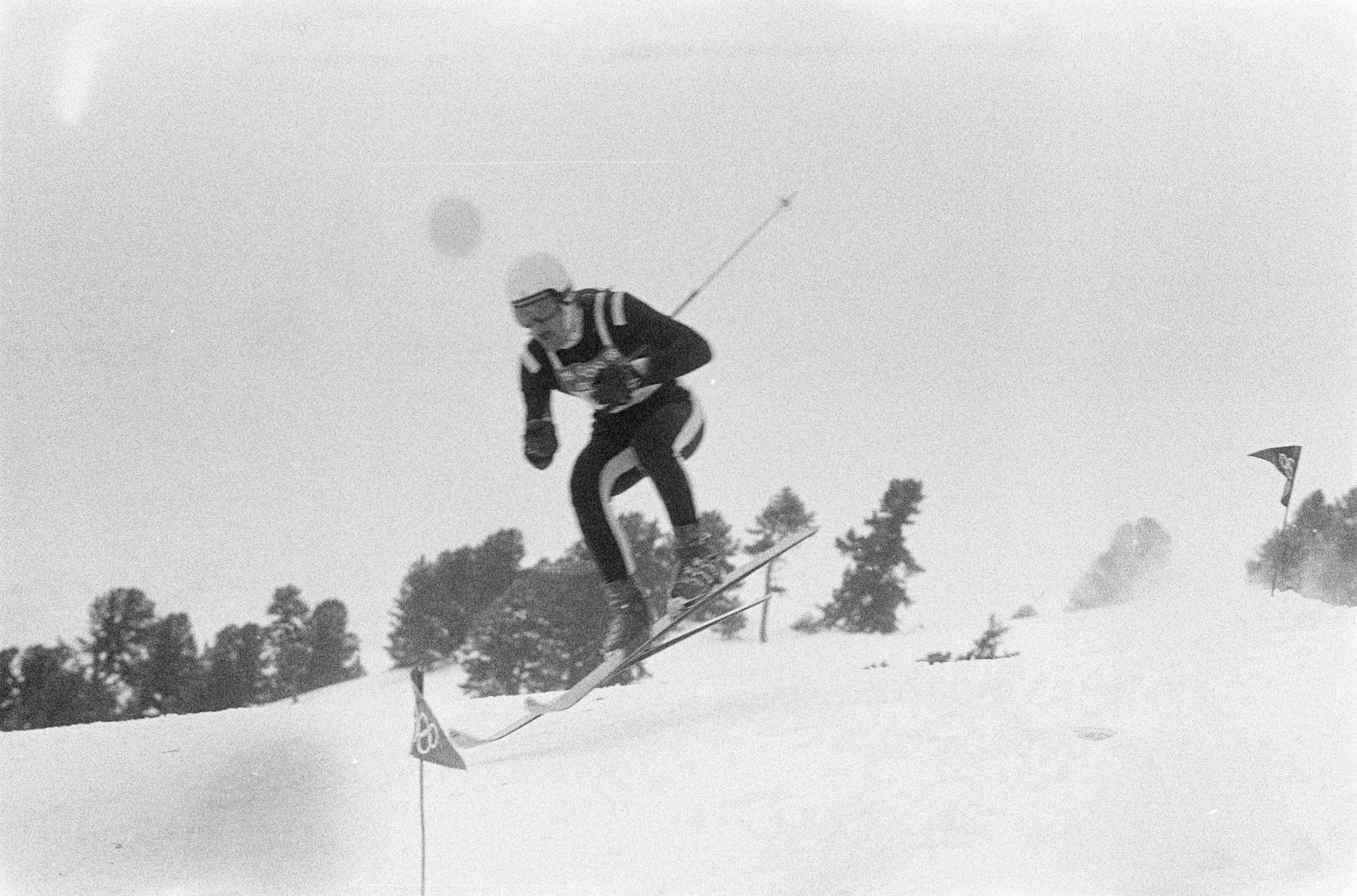

Personal information
- Born: 8 February 1939 Lech, Vorarlberg, Nazi Germany
- Died: 23 August 2019 (aged 80) Lech, Austria
- Height: 180 cm (5 ft 11 in)

Skiing career
- Sport: Alpine skiing
- Club: SK Arlberg
- Retired: March 1968 (age 29)
- Disciplines: Downhill, giant slalom, slalom, combined
- World Cup debut: January 1967 (age 27) inaugural season

Olympics
- Teams: 2 – (1964, 1968)
- Medals: 1 (1 gold)

World Championships
- Teams: 4 – (1962, '64, '66, '68) (includes two Olympics)
- Medals: 3 (2 gold)

World Cup
- Seasons: 2 – (1967, 1968)
- Podiums: 0
- Overall titles: 0 – (17th in 1967)
- Discipline titles: 0 – (9th in DH, 1967)
Medal record
Men's alpine skiing
Representing Austria
Olympic Games
Gold medal – first place	1964 Innsbruck	Downhill
World Championships
Gold medal – first place	1962 Chamonix	Giant slalom
Bronze medal – third place	1962 Chamonix	Downhill

Egon Zimmermann (8 February 1939 – 23 August 2019), often referred to as Egon Zimmermann II, was a World Cup alpine ski racer and Olympic gold medalist from Austria. Zimmermann won the Olympic downhill at Patscherkofel in 1964 and several medals on the professional tour in the late 1960s and early 1970s.

== Early life ==
Zimmermann was raised on a farm near Lech, Vorarlberg, with two brothers. Lech blossomed into a ski resort while he was growing up, and his family converted their farm house into a pensione. His childhood coincided with the post-World War II poverty of Austria, so not only did Zimmermann have no formal training, but his skis were often "fourth or fifth-hand." At 15, his father forced him to learn a trade, and he enrolled in a chef program in Paris. Zimmermann returned to Austria by the time he reached 18, and won a clean sweep of the 1958 Junior Championships. When he was promoted to the National team, he commented: "For me it was also the realization of a childhood dream, a dream interrupted by a kitchen."

== Career peak and Olympics ==
Zimmermann won two medals at the 1962 World Championships in Chamonix, a gold in the giant slalom and a bronze in downhill. He was named the "Skier of the Year" in 1963 by European journalists.

For the 1964 Olympics in Austria, the "dashing" and "handsome" Zimmermann was heavily favored to win. However, the course at Patscherkofel was quite difficult (nicknamed the "Course of Fear"), but he still managed to win by 0.74 seconds. (Franz Klammer famously won on the same course a dozen years later in 1976.) He did not enter the slalom and did not finish the giant slalom. Despite not sweeping the alpine events as did his compatriot Toni Sailer in 1956, Zimmermann appeared on the 10 February 1964 cover of Sports Illustrated magazine in the United States.

== Personal life ==
He owned a hotel in Lech am Arlberg and suffered from multiple sclerosis. Zimmermann also helped create Zimmermann's ski and snowboard in 1969.

Zimmermann died on 23 August 2019 at the age of 80.

== Olympic results ==
Year	Age	Slalom	Giant slalom	Super-G	Downhill	Combined
1964	24	—	DNF	not run	1	not run
1968	29	—	—	not run	13	not run

From 1948 through 1980, the Winter Olympics were also the World Championships for alpine skiing.
