= Italo Pedroncelli =

Italian alpine skier (1935–1992)

Personal information
- Nationality: Italian
- Born: 23 November 1935; Madesimo, Italy
- Died: 22 December 1992 (aged 57)

Sport
- Sport: Alpine skiing

Italo Pedroncelli (23 November 1935 – 22 December 1992) was an Italian alpine skier. He competed at the 1956, 1960 and the 1964 Winter Olympics.
