= Simon Brown (skier) =

Australian alpine skier (born 1942)

Personal information
- Nationality: Australian
- Born: 14 October 1942 Melbourne, Australia
- Died: 9 October 2017 (aged 74) Goondiwindi

Sport
- Sport: Alpine skiing, gliding

Simon Brown (14 October 1942 – 9 October 2017) was an Australian alpine skier. He competed in three events at the 1964 Winter Olympics.

Brown died in a glider accident near Goondiwindi Airport in 2017.
