= Vasilios Makridis =

Greek alpine skier (born 1939)

Personal information
- Born: 27 March 1939 (age 87) Veria, Greece
- Height: 5 ft 9 in (1.75 m)
- Weight: 163 lb (74 kg)

Sport
- Sport: Alpine skiing

Vasilios Makridis (Greek: Βασίλειος Μακρίδης; born March 27, 1939) is a retired Greek alpine skier who has competed at the 1964 Winter Olympics in Innsbruck, Austria. During his career, he has never taken part in competitions recognized by International Ski Federation. His best result was 56th place in slalom and he finished on 78th place in the giant slalom.
