= Lluis Viu =

Andorran-Spanish alpine skier (1943–2025)

Luis Viu
- Torres as Consul

Personal information
- Full name: Lluís Viu Torres
- Nationality: Andorran, Spanish
- Born: 27 March 1943; La Massana, Andorra
- Died: 15 July 2025 (aged 82); Andorra

Sport
- Sport: Alpine skiing

Lluís Viu Torres (27 March 1943 – 15 July 2025) was an Andorran-Spanish alpine skier. He competed for Spain in three events at the 1964 Winter Olympics as the Andorran Olympic Committee, of which he was co-founder and first vice-president and treasurer, had yet to be recognized. He was also active in local and international politics.

Viu later became coach and member of the selection committee of the Spanish ski team and from 1969 to 1972, he was director of the resort in Soldeu.

Viu was a co-founder of several Andorran associations, including the Red Cross and UNICEF. Later, before becoming consul, he was president of the Andorra Ski Club from 1981 to 1991. In 2010, Jaume Bartumeu, who was head of government at that time, appointed him permanent representative of Andorra to the United Nations Office in Geneva.

Viu died in Andorra on 15 July 2025, at the age of 82.
