= Paride Milianti =

Italian alpine skier

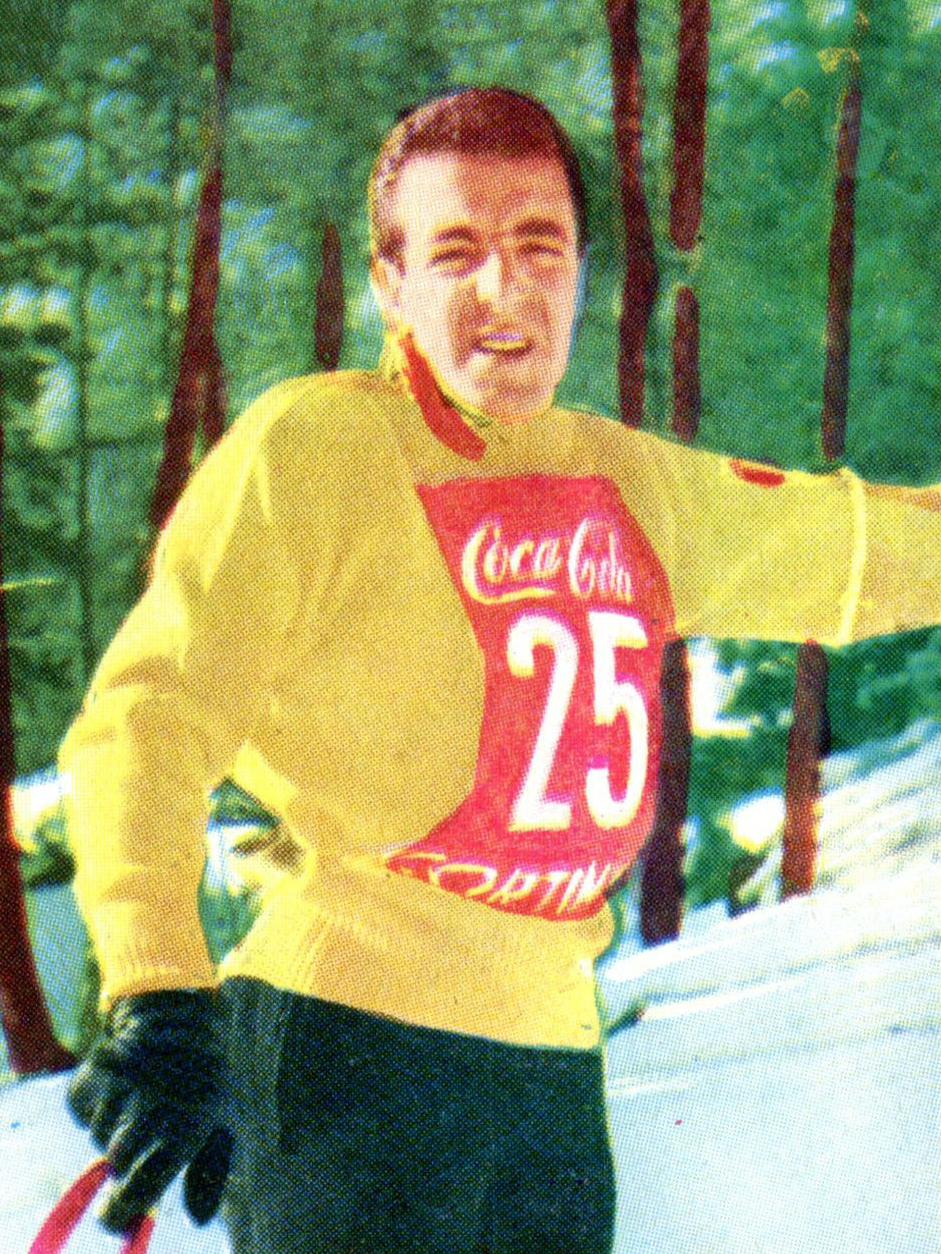
- Paride Milianti c. 1966

Personal information
- Born: 21 August 1934 (age 92) Abetone, Italy
- Height: 1.67 m (5 ft 6 in)
- Weight: 65 kg (143 lb)

Sport
- Sport: Alpine skiing

Paride Milianti (born 21 August 1934) is an Italian retired alpine skier. He competed at the 1956, 1960, and 1964 Winter Olympics in the downhill, slalom, and giant slalom events with the best results of eighth place in each the slalom and giant slalom in 1960.
