= Yoshiharu Fukuhara =

Japanese skier (1942–1975)

Personal information
- Nationality: Japanese
- Born: 10 February 1942 Rankoshi, Hokkaido, Japan
- Died: 3 October 1975 (aged 33)

Sport
- Sport: Alpine skiing

Yoshiharu Fukuhara (福原 吉春, Fukuhara Yoshiharu; 10 February 1942 – 3 October 1975) was a Japanese alpine skier. He competed at the 1964 Winter Olympics and the 1968 Winter Olympics.
