= Dimitrios Pappos =

Greek alpine skier (1939–2014)

Personal information
- Nationality: Greek
- Born: 16 October 1939; Sapai, Rodopi, Greece
- Died: 1 March 2014 (aged 74)

Sport
- Sport: Alpine skiing

Dimitrios Pappos (16 October 1939 – 1 March 2014) was a Greek alpine skier. He competed at the 1964 Winter Olympics and the 1968 Winter Olympics.
