= Rod Hebron =

Canadian alpine skier (1942–2023)

Rod Hebron (7 July 1942 – 16 April 2023) was a Canadian alpine skier who competed in the 1964 Winter Olympics and 1968 Winter Olympics.
