= Arild Holm =

Norwegian alpine skier (1942–2024)

Personal information
- Born: 11 February 1942 Stjørdal Municipality, German-occupied Norway
- Died: 27 February 2024 (aged 82)

Sport
- Sport: Alpine skiing

Arild Ragnar Holm (11 February 1942 – 27 February 2024) was a Norwegian alpine skier. Competing in all alpine disciplines, he won national titles in both downhill, giant slalom, slalom and combined in the 1960s, and represented Norway at the 1964 Winter Olympics.

== Personal life ==
Born in Stjørdal Municipality on 11 February 1942, Holm represented the clubs Strømmen IF and Bærums SK.

== Career ==
Holm won fifteen national titles in alpine skiing from 1961 to 1965, and was awarded the Kongepokal trophy in 1962 and 1964. He won three slalom titles, five titles in giant slalom, three downhill titles, and four times the alpine combined.

He participated at the 1964 Winter Olympics in Innsbruck, where he competed in downhill, slalom and giant slalom.

From 1972 he was assigned as coach for the Norwegian Ski Federation, and worked 40 years for the federation, eventually responsible for education (courses).

Holm died on 27 February 2024, at the age of 82.
