= Vasily Melnikov =

Soviet alpine skier (1943–2017)

Personal information
- Nationality: Soviet
- Born: 15 September 1943 Bryansk, Russian SFSR, Soviet Union
- Died: 19 September 2017 (aged 74) Kirovsk, Russia

Sport
- Sport: Alpine skiing

Vasily Melnikov (15 September 1943 – 19 September 2017) was a Soviet alpine skier. He competed at the 1964 Winter Olympics and the 1968 Winter Olympics.
