= Jean-Guy Brunet =

Canadian alpine skier (born 1939)

Personal information
- Born: 26 April 1939 (age 85)

Sport
- Country: Canada

Jean-Guy Brunet (born 26 April 1939) is a Canadian former alpine skier who competed in the 1960 Winter Olympics and in the 1964 Winter Olympics.
