= Juan Garriga (alpine skier) =

Spanish alpine skier (born 1940)

Personal information
- Nationality: Spanish
- Born: 18 September 1940; Barcelona, Spain
- Died: 27 February 2013 (aged 72)

Sport
- Sport: Alpine skiing

Juan Garriga (18 September 1940 – 27 February 2013) was a Spanish alpine skier. He competed in three events at the 1964 Winter Olympics.
