= Konstantinos Karydas =

Greek alpine skier (born 1942)

Personal information
- Nationality: Greek
- Born: 12 August 1942 (age 82)

Sport
- Sport: Alpine skiing

Konstantinos Karydas (born 12 August 1942) is a Greek alpine skier. He competed in three events at the 1964 Winter Olympics.
