= Javier Masana =

Spanish alpine skier (born 1941)

Personal information
- Nationality: Spanish
- Born: 2 February 1941 (age 84); Barcelona, Spain

Sport
- Sport: Alpine skiing

Javier Masana (born 2 February 1941) is a Spanish alpine skier. He competed in three events at the 1964 Winter Olympics.
