= Radim Koloušek =

Czech alpine skier (born 1941)

Personal information
- Nationality: Czech
- Born: 9 December 1941 (age 83); Prague, Protectorate of Bohemia and Moravia

Sport
- Sport: Alpine skiing

Radim Koloušek (born 9 December 1941) is a Czech alpine skier. He competed in three events at the 1964 Winter Olympics.
