= Peter Brockhoff =

Australian alpine skier (1936–2025)

Personal information
- Nationality: Australian
- Born: 3 October 1936; Melbourne, Victoria, Australia
- Died: 20 March 2025 (aged 88)

Sport
- Sport: Alpine skiing

Peter Brockhoff (3 October 1936 – 20 March 2025) was an Australian alpine skier. He competed at the 1960 Winter Olympics and the 1964 Winter Olympics.
