= Bengt-Erik Grahn =

Swedish alpine skier (1941–2019)

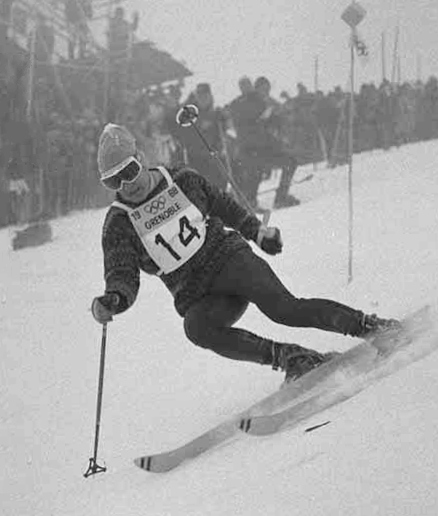
- Grahn at the 1968 Olympics

Personal information
- Born: 30 April 1941 Dikanäs, Vilhelmina, Sweden
- Died: 21 November 2019 (aged 78)
- Height: 165 cm (5 ft 5 in)
- Weight: 64 kg (141 lb)

Sport
- Sport: Alpine skiing
- Club: Tärna IK Fjällvinden, Tärnaby

Bengt-Erik Grahn (30 April 1941 – 21 November 2019) was a Swedish alpine skier. He competed in alpine skiing disciplines at the 1960, 1964 and 1968 Winter Olympics, with a best result was a 31st place in the downhill event in 1964.

In the FIS Alpine Skiing World Championships 1966 he finished 26th in the giant slalom. In the slalom he was on the way to win the gold medal; he was in the lead after the first run ahead Guy Périllat with a margin of 1.71 seconds, but he made a mistake shortly before the finish line and was disqualified. He finished 3rd in the slalom in Wengen in January 1965, won the slaloms in Val d'Isère in December 1965 and December 1966, and was second in the Alpine Combined there as well in December 1966. Capturing 2nd place in the slalom of Kitzbühel in January 1967, he got his first points in a World Cup race; subsequently he was twice 10th in World Cup Slalom races. Between 1961 and 1971 he became Swedish Champion seven times. He competed in the slalom at the 1960 Winter Olympics but fell and did not finish. He was disqualified in the 1st run of the slalom at the 1964 Winter Olympics. At the first run of 1968 Winter Olympics he finished 4th, but he did not finish the second run.
