= August Wolfinger =

Liechtenstein alpine skier (born 1949)

August Wolfinger (born 5 November 1949) is a Liechtensteiner former alpine skier who competed in the 1964 Winter Olympics.
