= Ulf Ekstam =

Finnish alpine skier (born 1941)

Ulf Ekstam (born 30 April 1941) is a Finnish former alpine skier who competed in the 1964 Winter Olympics and 1968 Winter Olympics.
