= Olle Rolén =

Swedish alpine skier (born 1944)

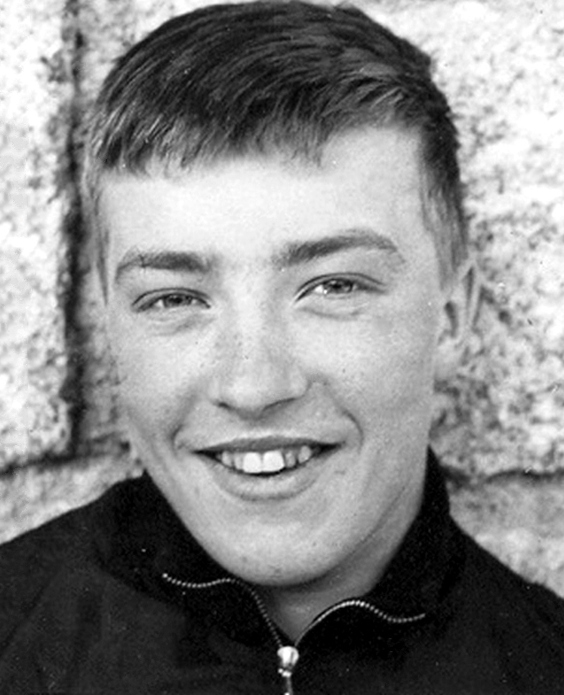

Personal information
- Born: 21 October 1944 (age 80); Åre, Sweden

Sport
- Sport: Alpine skiing
- Club: Åre SLK

Erik Olof Anders "Olle" Rolén (born 21 October 1944) is a Swedish former alpine skier. He competed at the 1964, 1968 and 1972 Winter Olympics with the best result of 20th place in the giant slalom in 1968.
