= John Rigby (alpine skier) =

British alpine skier (born 1942)

John Rigby (born 25 April 1942) is a British former alpine skier who competed in the 1964 Winter Olympics.
