= Petar Angelov (alpine skier) =

Bulgarian alpine skier (born 1943)

Personal information
- Nationality: Bulgarian
- Born: 26 December 1943 (age 82) Samokov, Bulgaria

Sport
- Sport: Alpine skiing

Petar Angelov (Bulgarian: Петър Ангелов, born 26 December 1943) is a Bulgarian alpine skier. He competed at the 1964 Winter Olympics and the 1968 Winter Olympics.
