= Jorge Abelardo Eiras =

Argentine alpine skier (born 1942)

Personal information
- Born: 7 August 1942 (age 82); Buenos Aires, Argentina

Sport
- Sport: Alpine skiing

Jorge Abelardo Eiras (born 7 August 1942) is an Argentine alpine skier. He competed at the 1960 Winter Olympics and the 1964 Winter Olympics.
