= Ivo Mahlknecht =

Italian alpine skier (1939–2020)

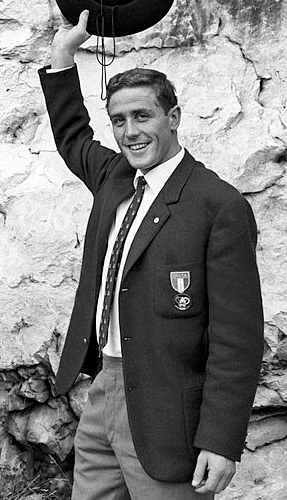
- Ivo Mahlknecht after the 1966 World Championships

Personal information
- Born: 21 May 1939 Urtijëi, Italy
- Died: 30 March 2020 (aged 80) Urtijëi, Italy
- Height: 1.82 m (6 ft 0 in)
- Weight: 87 kg (192 lb)

Sport
- Sport: Alpine skiing

Ivo Mahlknecht (21 May 1939 – 30 March 2020) was an Italian alpine skier. He competed at the 1964 and 1968 Winter Olympics in the downhill, slalom and giant slalom events with the best result of sixth place in the downhill in 1968.

Mahlknecht died of COVID-19 on 30 March 2020.
