= Raimo Manninen (alpine skier) =

Finnish alpine skier (1940–2009)

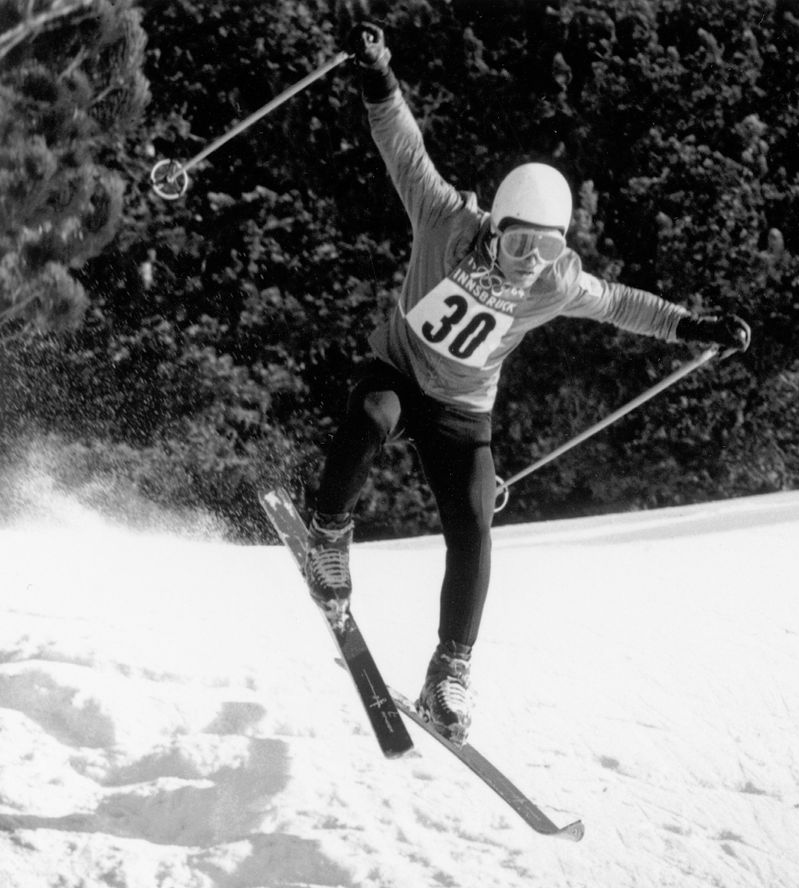
Raimo Manninen

Raimo Manninen (3 October 1940, in Lahti – 6 February 2009, in Janakkala) was a Finnish alpine skier who competed in the 1964 Winter Olympics and 1968 Winter Olympics.
