= Peter Wenzel (alpine skier) =

Australian alpine skier

Peter Wenzel is a former Australian alpine skier who competed at the 1964 Winter Olympics. He was a reserve and was called in to compete after Ross Milne died in a training accident soon before the games. He came 68th out of 77 competitors in the slalom and was 68th out of 80 in the giant slalom.
