= Ludwig Leitner =

German alpine skier (1940–2013)

Medal record

Men's alpine skiing

Representing West Germany

World Championships
Gold medal – first place	1964 Innsbruck	Combined
Bronze medal – third place	1962 Chamonix	Combined
Bronze medal – third place	1966 Portillo	Combined

Ludwig Leitner (February 24, 1940 – March 21, 2013) was a German alpine ski racer and world champion, born in Mittelberg, Austria.

Leitner became a world champion in the combined event in Innsbruck in 1964. He earned world championship bronze medals in the combined event 1962 and 1966.

Leitner competed at the 1960 Winter Olympics, where he finished 4th in slalom. At the 1964 Winter Olympics, he finished 5th in the slalom and 5th in the downhill.
