= Willy Favre =

Swiss alpine skier (1943–1986)

Medal record

Representing Switzerland

Men's Alpine skiing

Olympic Games
Silver medal – second place	1968 Grenoble	Giant Slalom

Willy Favre (September 24, 1943 – December 19, 1986) is a Swiss former alpine skier and Olympic medalist. He was born in Les Diablerets. He received a silver medal in the giant slalom at the 1968 Winter Olympics in Grenoble. He also competed at the 1964 Winter Olympics. He also received silver medals in the giant slalom at the 1967 World Cup, held in Adelboden, and the 1968 World Cup, held in Grenoble.

Due to his success at the Winter Olympics, his home village of Les Diablerets renamed a ski run in his honour. The run formerly known as 'La Jorasse' was used in the Lausanne 2020 Winter Youth Olympics as a slalom run. The run was fittingly renamed as the 'Willy Favre' to reflect his career in the sport.
