= Alpine skiing at the 1964 Winter Olympics =

Alpine skiing at the IX Olympic Winter Games
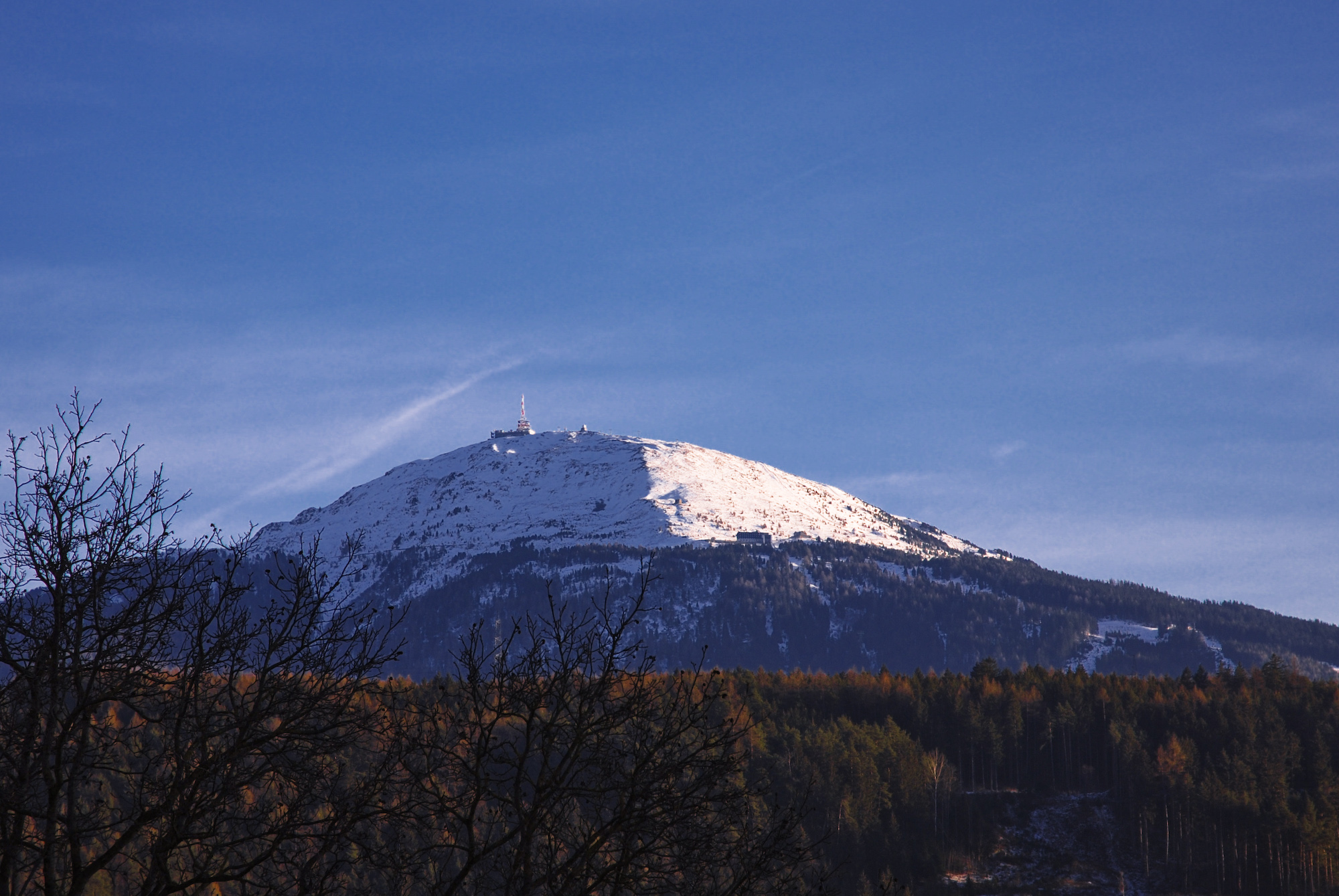
- Patscherkofel
- Venue: Patscherkofel (men's downhill), Axamer Lizum, Tyrol, Austria
- Dates: 30 January – 8 February 1964
- No. of events: 6
- Competitors: 174 from 31 nations

Alpine skiing at the 1964 Winter Olympics consisted of six events, held near Innsbruck, Austria, from January 30 to February 8, 1964.

The men's downhill was held on Patscherkofel (above Igls), the other five events at Axamer Lizum.

This was the first Olympics in which the finishing times were recorded in hundredths of a second, rather than tenths. It was the third and final Winter Olympics in which East and West Germany competed as the United Team of Germany. Mild weather led to a lack of snow, which was trucked in and packed down by the Austrian army.

During a training run for the men's downhill at Patscherkofel on January 25, Ross Milne of Australia lost control and left the course; he hit a tree and later died of a head injury.

The Winter Olympics returned to Innsbruck just 12 years later in 1976, after Denver returned its winning bid in November 1972 (Innsbruck was awarded the 1976 games in February 1973).

== Medal summary ==
Four nations won medals in alpine skiing, with Austria leading the total medals with seven (three gold, two silver, and two bronze). France also had three gold, with three silver medals. France's Marielle and Christine Goitschel led the individual medal table, each with one gold and one silver. The top men's medalist was Austria's Pepi Stiegler, who won gold and bronze.

=== Medal table ===
| Rank | Nation | Gold | Silver | Bronze | Total |
|---|---|---|---|---|---|
| 1 | France | 3 | 3 | 0 | 6 |
| 2 | Austria | 3 | 2 | 2 | 7 |
| 3 | United States | 0 | 2 | 2 | 4 |
| 4 | United Team of Germany | 0 | 0 | 1 | 1 |
| Totals (4 entries) | | 6 | 7 | 5 | 18 |

=== Men's events ===
| Event | Gold | | Silver | | Bronze | |
|---|---|---|---|---|---|---|
| Downhill | Egon Zimmermann; Austria | 2:18.16 | Léo Lacroix; France | 2:18.90 | Wolfgang Bartels; United Team of Germany | 2:19.48 |
| Giant slalom | François Bonlieu; France | 1:46.71 | Karl Schranz; Austria | 1:47.09 | Josef Stiegler; Austria | 1:48.05 |
| Slalom | Josef Stiegler; Austria | 2:11.13 | Billy Kidd; United States | 2:11.27 | Jimmie Heuga; United States | 2:11.52 |

=== Women's events ===
| Event | Gold | | Silver | | Bronze | |
|---|---|---|---|---|---|---|
| Downhill | Christl Haas; Austria | 1:55.39 | Edith Zimmermann; Austria | 1:56.42 | Traudl Hecher; Austria | 1:56.66 |
| Giant slalom | Marielle Goitschel; France | 1:52.24 | Christine Goitschel; France; Jean Saubert; United States | 1:53.11 | Not awarded | |
| Slalom | Christine Goitschel; France | 1:29.86 | Marielle Goitschel; France | 1:30.77 | Jean Saubert; United States | 1:31.36 |

== Course information ==
| Date | Race | Start Elevation | Finish Elevation | Vertical Drop | Course Length | Average Gradient |
|---|---|---|---|---|---|---|
| Thu 30-Jan | Downhill – men | 1,952 m (6,404 ft) | 1,085 m (3,560 ft) | 867 m (2,844 ft) | 3.120 km (1.939 mi) | 27.8% |
| Thu 06-Feb | Downhill – women | 2,310 m (7,580 ft) | 1,605 m (5,266 ft) | 705 m (2,313 ft) | 2.510 km (1.560 mi) | 28.1% |
| Sun 02-Feb | Giant slalom – men | 2,100 m (6,890 ft) | 1,570 m (5,151 ft) | 530 m (1,739 ft) | 1.250 km (0.777 mi) | 42.4% |
| Mon 03-Feb | Giant slalom – women | 2,050 m (6,726 ft) | 1,550 m (5,085 ft) | 500 m (1,640 ft) | 1.250 km (0.777 mi) | 40.0% |
| Sat 08-Feb | Slalom – men (2 runs) | 1,770 m (5,807 ft) | 1,570 m (5,151 ft) | 200 m (656 ft) | 0.470 km (0.292 mi) | 42.6% |
| Fri 07-Feb | Slalom – men (qualifying) | 1,730 m (5,676 ft) | 1,600 m (5,249 ft) | 130 m (427 ft) | 0.350 km (0.217 mi) | 37.1% |
| Sat 01-Feb | Slalom – women (2 runs) | 1,730 m (5,676 ft) | 1,600 m (5,249 ft) | 130 m (427 ft) | 0.350 km (0.217 mi) | 37.1% |

== Participating nations ==
Thirty-one nations sent alpine skiers to compete in the events in Innsbruck. India made its Olympic alpine skiing debut. Below is a list of the competing nations; in parentheses are the number of national competitors.

- Argentina (6)
- Australia (5)
- Austria (11)
- Belgium (1)
- Bulgaria (1)
- Canada (9)
- Chile (5)
- Czechoslovakia (2)
- Finland (2)
- France (11)
- United Team of Germany (10)
- Great Britain (11)
- Greece (3)
- Hungary (1)
- India (1)
- Iran (4)
- Iceland (3)
- Italy (11)
- Japan (5)
- South Korea (2)
- Lebanon (4)
- Liechtenstein (3)
- Norway (6)
- Poland (4)
- Soviet Union (7)
- Spain (6)
- Sweden (4)
- Switzerland (13)
- Turkey (5)
- United States (12)
- Yugoslavia (6)

== World championships ==
From 1948 through 1980, the alpine skiing events at the Winter Olympics also served as the World Championships, held every two years. With the addition of the giant slalom, the combined event was dropped for 1950 and 1952, but returned as a World Championship event in 1954 as a "paper race" which used the results from the three events. During the Olympics from 1956 through 1980, World Championship medals were awarded by the FIS for the combined event. The combined returned as a separate event at the World Championships in 1982 and at the Olympics in 1988.

=== Combined ===
Men's Combined

| Medal | Athlete | Points | DH | GS | SL |
|---|---|---|---|---|---|
| 1st place, gold medalist(s) | (West Germany) Ludwig Leitner (FRG) | 33.99 | 5 | 8 | 5 |
| 2nd place, silver medalist(s) | (Austria) Gerhard Nenning (AUT) | 34.37 | 7 | 6 | 7 |
| 3rd place, bronze medalist(s) | (United States) Billy Kidd (USA) | 36.45 | 16 | 7 | 2nd place, silver medalist(s) |
| 4 | (Switzerland) Willy Favre (SUI) | 48.82 | 8 | 4 | 14 |
| 5 | (France) Guy Périllat (FRA) | 51.56 | 6 | 10 | 12 |
| 6 | (Austria) Karl Schranz (AUT) | 54.75 | 11 | 2nd place, silver medalist(s) | 24 |

- Downhill: 30 January, Giant slalom: 2 February, Slalom: 8 February

Women's Combined

| Medal | Athlete | Points | DH | GS | SL |
|---|---|---|---|---|---|
| 1st place, gold medalist(s) | (France) Marielle Goitschel (FRA) | 34.82 | 10 | 1st place, gold medalist(s) | 2nd place, silver medalist(s) |
| 2nd place, silver medalist(s) | (Austria) Christl Haas (AUT) | 40.11 | 1st place, gold medalist(s) | 4 | 6 |
| 3rd place, bronze medalist(s) | (Austria) Edith Zimmermann (AUT) | 43.13 | 2nd place, silver medalist(s) | 6 | 5 |
| 4 | (United States) Jean Saubert (USA) | 58.76 | 26 | 2nd place, silver medalist(s) | 3rd place, bronze medalist(s) |
| 5 | (West Germany) Barbi Henneberger (FRG) | 70.40 | 5 | 7 | 10 |
| 6 | (Italy) Pia Riva (ITA) | 92.50 | 18 | 9 | 9 |

- Downhill: 6 February, Giant slalom: 3 February, and Slalom: 1 February
- Heidi Biebl of West Germany finished fourth in downhill and slalom but DQ'd in GS.

== Footnotes ==
1. ^{1a} Athletes from East and West Germany competed together as the "United Team of Germany," designated as the EUA. This combined team appeared in the 1956, 1960, and 1964 Winter Olympics.
