= 5th Vitranc Cup (1966) =

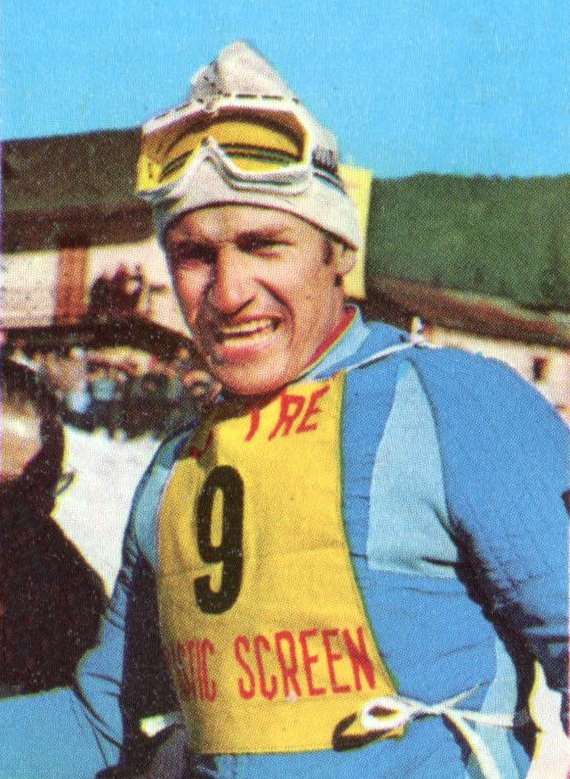
5th Vitranc Cup
Guy Périllat (FRA) won slalom event
Giant slalom
Date:	19 February 1966
Event:	FIS 1A International
Official list:	70
Ranked:	53
Course setter:	Marjan Magušar (YUG)
Gates:	72
Start:	1,355 m
Finish:	840 m
Vertical drop:	515 m
Slalom
Date:	20 February 1966
Event:	FIS 1A International
Official list:	68
Ranked:	43
Course 1:	»Bedanc«
Course 2:	»Vitranc«
Course setter 1:	Hans Senger (AUT)
Course setter 2:	Marjan Magušar (YUG)
Gates (1st run):	70
Gates (2nd run):	74

5th Vitranc Cup was an alpine skiing competition, held between 19 and 20 February 1966 in Kranjska Gora, SR Slovenia, Yugoslavia. They were hosting two FIS 1A international events.

== Official results ==
=== Giant slalom ===
On 19 February, giant slalom at vertical drop at 515 metres was held.

Rank	Competitor	Time
1	(Austria) Werner Bleiner	2:21.3
2	(France) Guy Périllat	2:22.9
3	(Austria) Karl Schranz	2:23.6
4	(France) Leo Lacroix	2:24.7
5	(France) Jules Melquiond	2:25.0
6	(West Germany) Ludwig Leitner	2:26.3
7	(Switzerland) Stefan Kälin	2:27.1
8	(France) Bernard Orcel	2:27.2
	(Italy) Gerardo Mussner	2:27.2
10	(France) Georges Mauduit	2:27.3
11	(Switzerland) Jakob Tischauser	2.27.6
12	(Switzerland) Willy Favre	2:28.8
13	(Switzerland) Andreas Sprecher	2:29.6
	(Switzerland) Kurt Schnider	2:29.6
15	(Switzerland) Albert Pitteloud	2:29.8
16	(Austria) Hugo Nindl	2:29.9
17	(Austria) Herbert Huber	2:30.0
18	(Sweden) Olle Rollen	2:30.1
19	(Sweden) Lars Olsson	2:30.3
20	(East Germany) Ernst Scherzer	2:30.4
21	(France) Pierre Stamos	2:30.5
22	(Austria) Stefan Sodat	2:30.9
23	(France) Alain Blanchard	2:34.0
24	(Italy) Giovanni Dibona	2:35.1
25	(Italy) Gioseppe De Biasio	2:37.7
	(Italy) Oswaldo Demetz	2:37.7
27	(Socialist Federal Republic of Yugoslavia) Peter Lakota	2:38.0
28	(United Kingdom) Jeremy Palmer-Tomkinson	2:39.4
29	(Socialist Federal Republic of Yugoslavia) Andrej Klinar	2:40.3
30	(Sweden) Per Olof Richardsson	2:41.9
	(Sweden) Staffan Lindgren	2:41.9
32	(Sweden) Rolf Edlund	2:42.3
33	(East Germany) Arndt Schumann	2:43.1
34	(East Germany) Bernd Dorfel	2:44.8
35	(Socialist Federal Republic of Yugoslavia) Tone Vogrinec	2:47.3
36	(Socialist Federal Republic of Yugoslavia) Mirko Klinar	2:47.9
37	(Socialist Federal Republic of Yugoslavia) Fric Detiček	2:48.3
38	(Socialist Federal Republic of Yugoslavia) Jože Gazvoda	2:50.6
39	(United Kingdom) Peter Norman	2:53.8
39	(Socialist Federal Republic of Yugoslavia) Oto Pustoslemšek	2:53.8
41	(United Kingdom) Charles von Westenholz	2:54.5
42	(Socialist Federal Republic of Yugoslavia) Janez Lajbaher	2:55.7
43	(Socialist Federal Republic of Yugoslavia) Igor Zajc	2:56.2
44	(Socialist Federal Republic of Yugoslavia) Andrej Soklič	2:57.7
45	(Romania) Gornel Tabaras	2:58.2
46	(United Kingdom) David Freeth	2:59.0
47	(Socialist Federal Republic of Yugoslavia) Marko Židan	3.01.6
48	(United Kingdom) Charles Palmer-Tomkinson	3:03.5
49	(Socialist Federal Republic of Yugoslavia) Blaž Jakopič	3:06.8
50	(Hungary) Josef Reith	3:08.2
51	(Romania) Virgil Brenci	3:20.1
52	(Romania) Dorin Munteanu	3:23.2
53	(Socialist Federal Republic of Yugoslavia) Alojz Fortin	3:29.9
	(Austria) Egon Zimmermann	DNS
	(West Germany) Maks Rieger	DNS
	(Romania) Kurt Ghon	DSQ
	(Italy) Carlo Senoner	DSQ
	(Austria) Heini Messner	DNF
	(East Germany) Eberhard Riedel	DNF
	(Italy) Ivo Mahlknecht	DNF
	(East Germany) Peter Lutzendorf	DNF
	(East Germany) Klaus Illing	DNF
	(West Germany) Georg Sonneberger	DNF
	(Austria) Gerhard Riml	DNF
	(Sweden) Mauritz Lindstrom	DNF
	(Socialist Federal Republic of Yugoslavia) Janez Čop	DNF
	(Hungary) Andras Marotz	DNF
	(Australia) Malcolm Milne	DNF
	(Japan) Kanai Takashi	DNF
	(Hungary) Geza Nemeth	DNF

=== Slalom ===
On 20 February, slalom was held on »Bedanc« (1st) and »Vitranc« (2nd) courses.

Rank	Competitor	1st run	2nd run	Total
1	(France) Guy Périllat	57.03	54.63	1:51.66
2	(Austria) Karl Schranz	57.14	54.55	1:51.69
3	(West Germany) Ludwig Leitner	57.30	55.39	1:52.69
4	(Austria) Heini Messner	57.19	55.54	1:52.73
5	(Italy) Carlo Senoner	57.09	55.81	1:52.90
6	(Austria) Hugo Nindl	58.09	55.17	1:53.19
7	(East Germany) Ernst Scherzer	59.25	55.73	1:54.98
8	(Sweden) Olle Rollen	57.76	57.75	1:55.51
9	(Italy) Ivo Mahlknecht	59.19	56.51	1:55.70
10	(Switzerland) Andreas Sprecher	59.43	56.82	1:56.25
11	(Austria) Stefan Sodat	59.13	57.27	1:56.40
12	(France) Alain Blanchard	59.80	56.75	1:56.55
13	(France) Georges Mauduit	1:00.13	56.52	1:56.65
14	(Austria) Herbert Huber	59.36	57.40	1:56.76
15	(France) Pierre Stamos	1:00.40	57.41	1:57.81
16	(Switzerland) Kurt Schnider	1:00.53	57.34	1:57.87
17	(Switzerland) Willy Favre	59.98	58.02	1:58.00
18	(East Germany) Peter Lutzendorf	1:00.94	57.40	1:58.34
19	(Sweden) Lars Olsson	1:00.03	58.54	1:58.57
20	(Italy) Gerardo Musser	1:01.04	57.54	1:58.58
21	(Italy) Giovanni Dibonar	59.49	59.78	1:59.27
22	(Switzerland) Albert Pitteloud	1:01.68	58.02	1:59.70
23	(France) Bernard Orcel	1:00.57	59.37	1:59.94
24	(Sweden) Staffan Lindgren	1:01.40	59.49	2:00.49
25	(Sweden) Per Olof Richardsson	1:03.53	57.82	2:01.35
26	(Switzerland) Jakob Tischauser	1:02.53	59.29	2:01.82
27	(West Germany) Georg Sonneberger	1:03.23	1:00.45	2:03.68
28	(Socialist Federal Republic of Yugoslavia) Blaž Jakopič	1:04.31	1:02.27	2:06.58
29	(Italy) Oswaldo Demetz	1:02.20	1:04.85	2:07.05
30	(East Germany) Bernd Dorfel	1:05.27	1:02.88	2:08.15
31	(Socialist Federal Republic of Yugoslavia) Andrej Klinar	1:06.26	1:04.06	2:10.32
32	(Australia) Malcolm Milne	1:06.62	1:06.16	2:12.78
33	(Socialist Federal Republic of Yugoslavia) Mirko Klinar	1:07.19	1:06.30	2:13.49
34	(Socialist Federal Republic of Yugoslavia) Tone Vogrinec	1:08.99	1:05.15	2:14.14
35	(Romania) Kurt Ghon	1:12.24	1:04.16	2:16.40
36	(United Kingdom) Peter Norman	1:09.46	1:07.60	2:17.06
37	(Socialist Federal Republic of Yugoslavia) Jože Gazvoda	1:14.58	1:04.39	2:18.97
38	(Romania) Gornel Tabaras	1:14.97	1:04.31	2:19.28
39	(United Kingdom) Charles von Westnholz	1:12.50	1:07.48	2:19.98
40	(Romania) Dorin Munteanu	1:13.52	1:07.96	2:21.48
41	(United Kingdom) Charles Palmer-Tomkinson	1:14.24	1:09.81	2:24.05
42	(United Kingdom) David Freeth	1:13.13	1:20.55	2:33.68
43	(Hungary) Geza Nemeth	1:23.89	1:19.65	2:43.54
	(Austria) Egon Zimmermann	Did not start		
	(Socialist Federal Republic of Yugoslavia) Igor Zajc	Disqualified in 1st run		
	(France) Leo Lacroix	Disqualified in 1st run		
	(Austria) Werner Bleiner	Disqualified in 1st run		
	(Socialist Federal Republic of Yugoslavia) Oto Pustoslemšek	Disqualified in 1st run		
	(Socialist Federal Republic of Yugoslavia) Janez Čop	Disqualified in 1st run		
	(Socialist Federal Republic of Yugoslavia) Andrej Soklič	Disqualified in 1st run		
	(Socialist Federal Republic of Yugoslavia) Stjepan Puhak	Disqualified in 1st run		
	(Sweden) Rolf Edlund	Disqualified in 2nd run		
	(France) Jules Melquiond	Disqualified in 2nd run		
	(Switzerland) Stefan Kälin	Disqualified in 2nd run		
	(United Kingdom) Jeremy Palmer-Tomkinson	Disqualified in 2nd run		
	(Socialist Federal Republic of Yugoslavia) Peter Lakota	Disqualified in 2nd run		
	(Socialist Federal Republic of Yugoslavia) Alojz Fortin	Disqualified in 2nd run		
	(Socialist Federal Republic of Yugoslavia) Janez Lajbaher	Disqualified in 2nd run		
	(Socialist Federal Republic of Yugoslavia) Fric Detiček	Did not finish in 1st run		
	(Japan) Kanai Takashi	Did not finish in 1st run		
	(Austria) J. Rieth	Did not finish in 1st run		
	(Hungary) Andras Marotz	Did not finish in 1st run		
	(Romania) Virgil Brenci	Did not finish in 1st run		
	(Socialist Federal Republic of Yugoslavia) Marko Kavčič	Did not finish in 1st run		
	(Italy) Gioseppe de Biasio	Did not finish in 2nd run		
	(East Germany) Arndt Schumann	Did not finish in 2nd run		
	(Sweden) Mauritz Lindstrom	Did not finish in 2nd run		
	(East Germany) Eberhard Riedel	Did not finish in 2nd run		
	(East Germany) Klaus Illing	Did not finish in 2nd run		
