= 4th Vitranc Cup (1965) =

International Alpine skiing competition in Yugoslavia

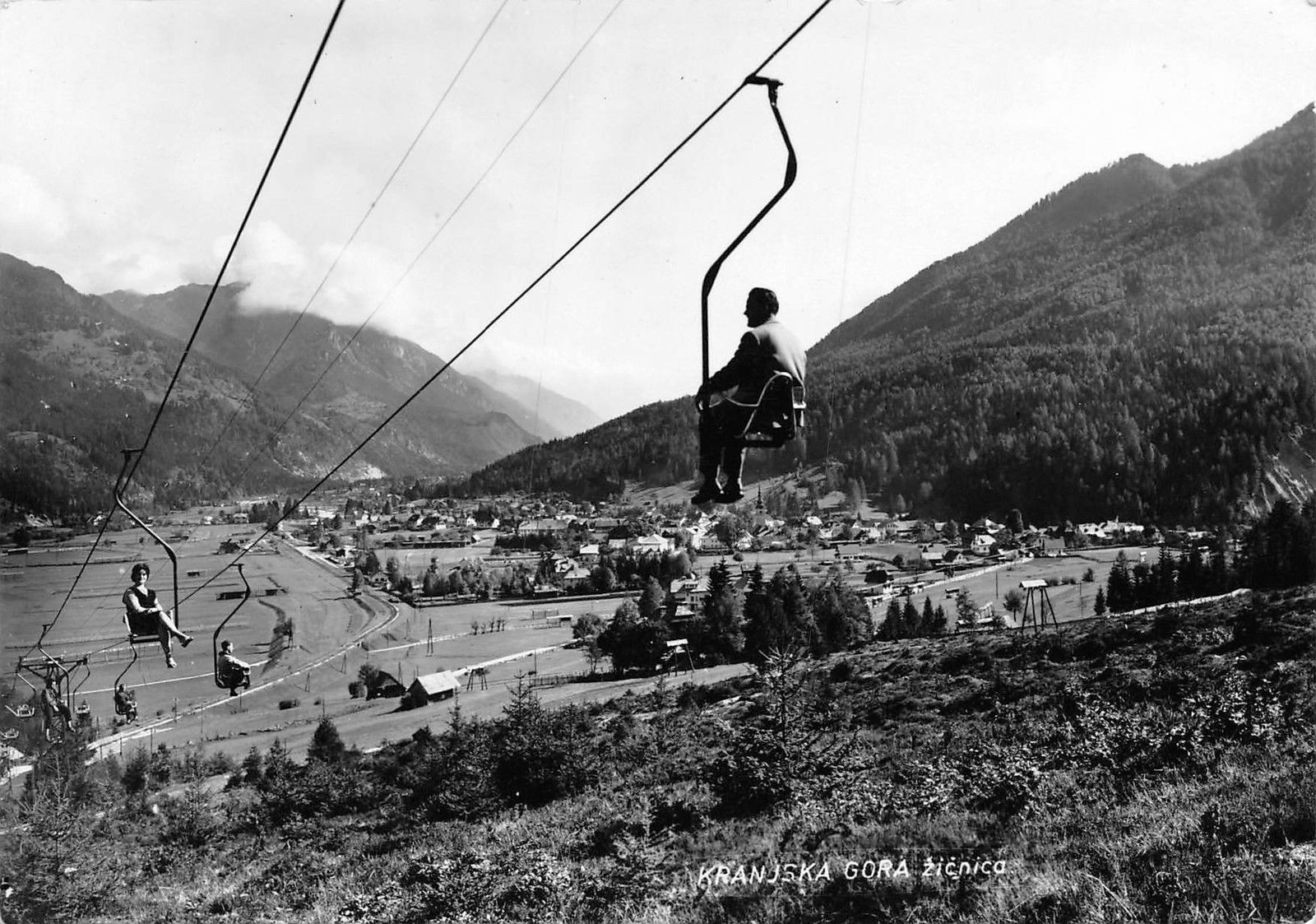
4th Vitranc Cup
Giant slalom
Date:	27 February 1965
Event:	FIS 1A International
Official list:	45
Ranked:	32
Course setter:	Marjan Magušar (JUG)
Gates:	67
Start:	1,410 m
Finish:	820 m
Vertical drop:	590 m
Slalom
Date:	28 February 1965
Event:	FIS 1A International
Official list:	35
Ranked:	20
Course 1:	»Bedanc«
Course 2:	»Vitranc«
Course setter 1:	Pepi Stiegler (AUT)
Course setter 2:	Marjan Magušar (JUG)
Gates (1st run):	72
Gates (2nd run):	71
Vertical drop:	180 m

4th Vitranc Cup was an alpine skiing competition, held between 27 and 28 February 1965 in Kranjska Gora, SR Slovenia, Yugoslavia. They were hosting two FIS 1A international events.

== Official results ==
=== Giant slalom ===
On 27 February, the longest giant slalom in history of Vitranc Cup with vertical drop at 590 metres was held.

Rank	Competitor	Time
1	(Switzerland) Edmund Bruggmann	2:33.04
2	(Italy) Felice De Nicolo	2:34.73
3	(France) Michel Arpin	2:34.83
4	(Austria) Gerhard Nenninxg	2:34.95
5	(Austria) Franz Digruber	2:35.01
6	(France) Georges Mauduit	2:35.54
7	(Austria) Werner Bleiner	2:35.75
8	(Switzerland) Stefan Kälin	2:36.66
9	(France) Leuis Jausfret	2:36.98
10	(East Germany) Ernst Scherzer	2:37.46
11	(Austria) Stefan Sodat	2:37.81
12	(Switzerland) Bent Zogg	2:39.18
13	(Switzerland) Andreas Sphetsher	2:40.18
14	(Switzerland) Kurt Schnider	2:40.34
15	(Austria) Adalbort Leitner	2:40.83
16	(Austria) Franz Rauter	2:41.98
17	(Italy) Martino Fiel	2:42.57
18	(East Germany) Klaus Illing	2:42.82
19	(France) Jacques Fourno	2:42.98
20	(Austria) Stefan Kaponis	2:43.90
21	(Italy) Giovanni Dibona	2:44.62
22	(Italy) Giorgio Malkneu	2:46.37
23	(Austria) Walter Winkler	2:49.64
24	(Socialist Federal Republic of Yugoslavia) Andrej Klinar	2:49.81
25	(Socialist Federal Republic of Yugoslavia) Tone Vogrinec	2:50.55
26	(Switzerland) Mario Bergamin	2:54.00
27	(Socialist Federal Republic of Yugoslavia) Fric Detiček	2:57.43
28	(Socialist Federal Republic of Yugoslavia) Gert Dogša	2:58.69
29	(Socialist Federal Republic of Yugoslavia) Igor Zajc	3:03.57
30	(Socialist Federal Republic of Yugoslavia) Jože Gazvoda	3:10.14
31	(Socialist Federal Republic of Yugoslavia) Ivan Srebre	3:10.90
32	(Socialist Federal Republic of Yugoslavia) Andrej Ponikvar	3:17.92
	(Italy) Bruno Beroloefa	DNS
	(Socialist Federal Republic of Yugoslavia) Oto Pustoslemšek	DSQ
	(Socialist Federal Republic of Yugoslavia) Blaž Jakopič	DSQ
	(East Germany) Gothard Lorenz	DSQ
	(France) Pierro Stawcs	DNF
	(Socialist Federal Republic of Yugoslavia) Peter Lakota	DNF
	(Socialist Federal Republic of Yugoslavia) Alojz Fortin	DNF
	(Socialist Federal Republic of Yugoslavia) Mirko Klinar	DNF
	(Socialist Federal Republic of Yugoslavia) Janez Lajbaher	DNF
	(Socialist Federal Republic of Yugoslavia) Jože Komac	DNF
	(Socialist Federal Republic of Yugoslavia) Jože Svetina	DNF
	(Socialist Federal Republic of Yugoslavia) Davor Senci	DNF
	(Socialist Federal Republic of Yugoslavia) Marko Židan	DNF

=== Slalom ===
On 28 February, slalom was held on »Bedanc« (1st) and »Vitranc« (2nd) courses with vertical drop at 180 metres.

Rank	Competitor	1st run	2nd run	Total
1	(France) Michel Arpin	59.21	57.04	1:56.25
2	(Austria) Franz Digruber	1:00.33	56.00	1:56.33
3	(France) E. Maudit	59.68	58.17	1:57.85
4	(Switzerland) Edmund Bruggmann	1:00.72	57.79	1:58.51
5	(France) Louis Jauffret	1:01.39	57.55	1:58.94
6	(Italy) Felice De Nicolo	1:02.28	57.70	1:59.98
7	(France) Jacques Fourno	1:02.16	59.02	2:01.18
8	(East Germany) Klaus Illing	1:02.29	59.90	2:02.19
9	(Austria) Adalbert Leitner	1:03.30	59.67	2:02.97
10	(Austria) Werner Bleiner	1:03.44	1:00.39	2:03.83
11	(Switzerland) Andreas Sprecher	1:04.39	1:00.29	2:04.68
12	(Austria) Franz Rauter	1:06.44	1:00.80	2:07.24
13	(Switzerland) Mario Bergamin	1:06.27	1:01.80	2:08.07
14	(Socialist Federal Republic of Yugoslavia) Andrej Klinar	1:08.86	1:04.43	2:13.29
15	(Switzerland) Bent Zogg	1:13.74	1:00.82	2:14.56
16	(Socialist Federal Republic of Yugoslavia) Oto Pustoslemšek	1:13.31	1:06.80	2:20.11
17	(Socialist Federal Republic of Yugoslavia) Jože Gazvoda	1:21.48	1:14.37	2:35.85
18	(Socialist Federal Republic of Yugoslavia) Marko Židan	1:17.13	1:19.42	2:36.55
19	(Socialist Federal Republic of Yugoslavia) Janez Laibacher	1:18.87	1:21.10	2:39.97
20	(Socialist Federal Republic of Yugoslavia) N. Sigfried	1:22.79	1:18.63	2:40.42
	(Socialist Federal Republic of Yugoslavia) Janez Čop	Did not start		
	(Italy) Bruno Berolo(e)fa	Did not start		
	(Socialist Federal Republic of Yugoslavia) Peter Lakota	Did not start		
	(France) Pierre Stamos	Did not start		
	(East Germany) Gothard Lorenz	Disqualified		
	(Switzerland) Kurt Schnider	Disqualified		
	(Austria) Gerhard Nenning	Disqualified		
	(Socialist Federal Republic of Yugoslavia) Fric Detiček	Disqualified		
	(Socialist Federal Republic of Yugoslavia) Igor Zajc	Disqualified		
	(Socialist Federal Republic of Yugoslavia) Davor Senci	Disqualified		
	(Switzerland) Stefan Kälin	Disqualified		
	(Italy) Martino Fill	Disqualified		
	(Austria) Stefan Kaponig	Did not finish		
	(Socialist Federal Republic of Yugoslavia) Jože Svetina	Did not finish		
	(Italy) Giovanni Dibona	Did not finish		
