= Vitranc Cup =

Alpine ski competition

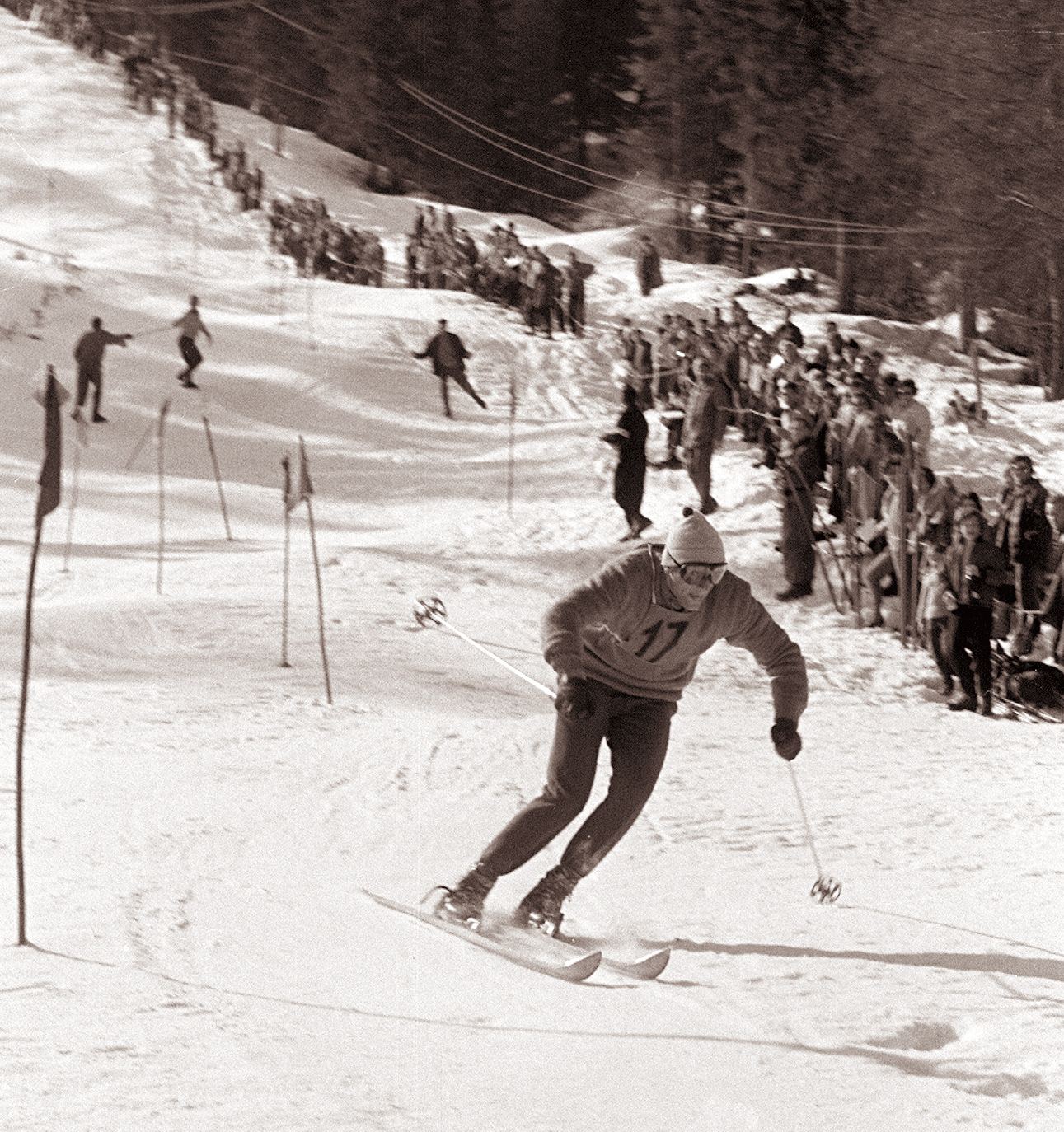
Vitranc Cup
From the first Vitranc Cup (1961)
Information
Slovenian:	Pokal Vitranc
Debut:	4–5 March 1961
Disciplines:	slalom, giant slalom
Member:	Club5+
Editions:	61
Most wins
Total:	(Austria) Marcel Hirscher (6x)
Giant slalom:	(United States) Ted Ligety (5x)
Slalom:	(Austria) Benjamin Raich (4x)
World Cup events
Total:	80
Men:	79
Women:	1
Current course
Name:	"Podkoren 3"
Opened:	1 December 1983
Max. incline:	30.5° degrees (59%)
Min. incline:	10.2° degrees (18%)
Architect:	(Slovenia) Peter Lakota
Full cancelation
5–times:	1974, 1976, 1981, 2000, 2020

Vitranc Cup (Slovenian: Pokal Vitranc) is an annual FIS Alpine Ski World Cup competition, held since 1961 in Kranjska Gora, Upper Carniola, Slovenia.

For Giant slalom, Kranjska Gora is considered one of the three most prestigious and challenging locations in the world, along with Adelboden and Alta Badia.

This competition is the successor of the "Bukovniški smuk" (Bukovnik Downhill), "kamikaze dowhnill" race first held in Kranjska Gora in 1949.

== History ==
=== 1961: First edition ===
On 4 March 1961, the first ever Vitranc Cup event was held on an extremely demanding and steep giant slalom course from the top of the Vitranc mountain. The event was also known as "hara-kiri with acceleration".

=== 1962: Event not scheduled at all ===
In 1962, for the only time in history, the competition did not meet the schedule at all, because the Yugoslavian Ski Federation office in Belgrade simply forgot to send the application to the International Ski Federation (FIS).

=== 1968: World Cup debut ===
On 10 March 1968, the Vitranc Cup (Kranjska Gora) hosted the first ever World Cup alpine ski event in Slovenia (also Yugoslavia at the same time). The Slalom was won by the French skier Patrick Russel.

=== 1982: Record attendance ===
On 20 March 1982, Bojan Križaj was the first Slovenian to win the World Cup at the home ground in front of a record crowd of 32,000 people. This record hasn't been broken yet at alpine skiing events in Slovenia, and it beat the record set at Ingemar Stenmark's event.

=== 1983: New permanent course opened ===
On 29–30 January 1983, the Vitranc Cup competition was, for the last time, held on an old steep course above the old gas station, before moving to a new and now permanent course in nearby Podkoren, still in use today.

On 1–2 December 1983, the competition was, for the first time, held and permanently moved to the new "Podkoren 3" course nearby, constructed and designed by ex Slovenian skier Peter Lakota. The women's competition was held first, the next day was the men's race. It was the first and only time in history when Slovenia hosted the World Cup opening race for both men and women. This was also the first and only time when women competed for the Vitranc Cup.

=== 1985: Petrovič won in front of a home crowd ===
On 21 December 1985, Rok Petrovič celebrated the 2nd of his five World Cup career wins in his career, dominating the season, in front of a home crowd of 30,000 people.

=== 1986: Double Slovenian win ===
On 20 December 1986, then Slovenian sports icons Bojan Križaj and Petrovič achieved a double Slovenian win, beating 3rd placed Ingemar Stenmark.

== Vitranc Cup Top 3 results ==
=== Men ===
Edition	Season	Date	Event	Winner	Second	Third
↓ FIS 1A International ↓
1st	1960/61	4 March 1961	GS	(Austria) Josef Stiegler	(West Germany) Joseph Behr	(Italy) Helmut Gartner
1st	1960/61	5 March 1961	SL	(Austria) Ernst Falch	(Austria) Josef Stiegler	(Austria) Helmut Schranz
2nd	1962/63	2 March 1963	GS	(France) Georges Mauduit	(Switzerland) Robert Grunenfelder	(France) Jean-Claude Killy
2nd	1962/63	3 March 1963	SL	(Austria) Josef Stiegler	(France) Jean-Claude Killy	(Austria) Hias Leitner
3rd	1963/64	29 February 1964	GS	(France) Jean-Claude Killy	(Switzerland) Willy Favre	(Switzerland) Beat von Allmen
3rd	1963/64	1 March 1964	SL	(France) Michel Arpin	(Austria) Franz Digruber	(East Germany) Ernst Scherzer
4th	1964/65	27 February 1965	GS	(Switzerland) Edmund Bruggmann	(Italy) Felice De Nicolo	(France) Michel Arpin
4th	1964/65	28 February 1965	SL	(France) Michel Arpin	(Austria) Franz Digruber	(France) E. Maudit
5th	1965/66	19 February 1966	GS	(Austria) Werner Bleiner	(France) Guy Périllat	(Austria) Karl Schranz
5th	1965/66	20 February 1966	SL	(France) Guy Périllat	(Austria) Karl Schranz	(West Germany) Ludwig Leitner
6th	1966/67	11 March 1967	GS	(East Germany) Eberhard Riedel	(East Germany) Ernst Scherzer	(Austria) Harald Stüfer
6th	1966/67	12 March 1967	SL	(France) Alain Blanchard	(Poland) Andrzej Bachleda	(France) Patrick Russel
↓ FIS International ↓
7th^{(1)}	1967/68	9 March 1968	GS	(Switzerland) Stefan Kälin	(Austria) Stefan Sodat	(Italy) Enrico Demetz
↓ FIS World Cup ↓
7th^{(2)}	1967/68	10 March 1968	SL	(France) Patrick Russel	(Austria) Franz Digruber	(Switzerland) Stefan Kälin
8th	1968/69	16 February 1969	GS	(Austria) Reinhard Tritscher	(Austria) Alfred Matt	(Austria) Franz Digruber
8th	1968/69	17 February 1969	SL	(Switzerland) Edmund Bruggmann	(France) Alain Penz	(Austria) Herbert Huber
9th^{(1)}	1969/70	21 January 1970	GS	(Switzerland) Dumeng Giovanoli	(France) Patrick Russel	(France) Georges Mauduit
↓ FIS International ↓
9th^{(2)}	1969/70	22 January 1970	SL	(Switzerland) Peter Frei	(Norway) Hans Bjorge	(Switzerland) Dumeng Giovanoli
10th	1970/71	20 February 1971	GS	(Italy) Sergio Filippo	(France) N. P. Pouteil	(France) Jean Louis Ambroise
10th	1970/71	21 February 1971	SL	(France) Gérard Bonnevie	(France) N. P. Pouteil	(Austria) Hubert Berchtold
↓ FIS Europa Cup ↓
11th	1971/72	4 January 1972	GS	(Switzerland) Werner Mattle	(France) Alain Penz	(West Germany) Sepp Heckelmiller
11th	1971/72	5 January 1972	SL	(Poland) Andrzej Bachleda	(France) Alain Penz	(United States) Rick Chaffee
12th	1972/73	6 January 1973	GS	(Italy) Gustav Thöni	(Italy) Helmuth Schmalzl	(Austria) Hansi Hinterseer
12th	1972/73	7 January 1973	SL	(France) Claude Perrot	(Italy) Gustav Thöni	(Austria) Alfred Matt
13th	1973/74	10 January 1974	GS	cancelled due to lack of snow		
13th	1973/74	11 January 1974	SL	cancelled due to lack of snow		
↓ FIS World Cup ↓
↓ see ↓	1974/75	20 December 1974	GS	lack of snow; rescheduled to 13–14 April 1975 (see 14th edition)		
↓ FIS International ↓
14th	1974/75	13 April 1975	GS	(Spain) F. Fernández Ochoa	(Austria) Manfred Brunner	(Italy) Herbert Plank
14th	1974/75	14 April 1975	SL	(Spain) F. Fernández Ochoa	(Italy) Mauro Bernardi	(Austria) Johann Kniewasser
↓ FIS Europa Cup ↓
15th	1975/76	11 January 1976	SL	(Austria) Andreas Arnold	(Austria) Bartl Gensbichler	(Spain) Jorge García
↓ FIS World Cup ↓
16th	1976/77	21 December 1976	SL	high temperatures; replaced at Laax (3 January 1977)		
↓ FIS International ↓
17th	1977/78	21 December 1977	GS	(Italy) Mauro Bernardi	(Austria) Hans Enn	(Socialist Federal Republic of Yugoslavia) Bojan Križaj
17th	1977/78	22 December 1977	SL	(Austria) Anton Steiner	(Italy) Mauro Bernardi	(Austria) Manfred Brunner
↓ FIS World Cup ↓
18th	1978/79	21 December 1978	SL	(Sweden) Ingemar Stenmark	(Liechtenstein) Paul Frommelt	(Italy) Leonardo David
18th	1978/79	22 December 1978	GS	(Sweden) Ingemar Stenmark	(Switzerland) Peter Lüscher	(Socialist Federal Republic of Yugoslavia) Bojan Križaj
↓ FIS International ↓
19th	1979/80	14 December 1979	GS	(Socialist Federal Republic of Yugoslavia) Bojan Križaj	(Italy) Bruno Nockler	(Socialist Federal Republic of Yugoslavia) Boris Strel
19th	1979/80	15 December 1979	SL	(Socialist Federal Republic of Yugoslavia) Bojan Križaj	(Italy) Piero Gros	(Italy) Bruno Nockler
↓ FIS World Cup ↓
20th	1980/81	28 March 1981	GS	lack of snow and high temperatures; replaced the same day at Laax		
21st	1981/82	19 March 1982	GS	(United States) Phil Mahre	(Austria) Hans Enn	(Luxembourg) Marc Girardelli
21st	1981/82	20 March 1982	SL	(Socialist Federal Republic of Yugoslavia) Bojan Križaj	(Sweden) Ingemar Stenmark	(Austria) Franz Gruber
22nd	1982/83	29 January 1983	GS	(Austria) Hans Enn	(Switzerland) Max Julen	(Sweden) Ingemar Stenmark
22nd	1982/83	30 January 1983	SL	(Austria) Franz Gruber	(Sweden) Stig Strand	(France) Michel Canac
23rd	1983/84	2 December 1983	SL	(Liechtenstein) Andreas Wenzel	(Bulgaria) Petar Popangelov	(Liechtenstein) Paul Frommelt
24th	1984/85	15 February 1985	GS	(Switzerland) Thomas Bürgler	(Switzerland) Pirmin Zurbriggen	(Luxembourg) Marc Girardelli
24th	1984/85	16 February 1985	SL	(Luxembourg) Marc Girardelli	(Sweden) Ingemar Stenmark	(Liechtenstein) Paul Frommelt (Sweden) Jonas Nilsson
25th	1985/86	20 December 1985	GS	(Switzerland) Joël Gaspoz	(Italy) Roberto Erlacher	(Austria) Hubert Strolz
25th	1985/86	21 December 1985	SL	(Socialist Federal Republic of Yugoslavia) Rok Petrovič	(Sweden) Jonas Nilsson	(Austria) Thomas Stangassinger
26th	1986/87	19 December 1986	GS	(Switzerland) Joël Gaspoz	(Italy) Roberto Erlacher	(Italy) Richard Pramotton
26th	1986/87	20 December 1986	SL	(Socialist Federal Republic of Yugoslavia) Bojan Križaj	(Socialist Federal Republic of Yugoslavia) Rok Petrović	(Sweden) Ingemar Stenmark
27th	1987/88	19 December 1987	GS	(Austria) Helmut Mayer	(Switzerland) Pirmin Zurbriggen	(Austria) Hubert Strolz
27th	1987/88	20 December 1987	SL	(Italy) Alberto Tomba	(Italy) Richard Pramotton	(Austria) Günther Mader
28th	1988/89	17 December 1988	SL	(Luxembourg) Marc Girardelli	(West Germany) Armin Bittner	(Italy) Alberto Tomba
29th	1989/90	6 January 1990	GS	cancelled and later replaced at La Villa (14 January)		
29th	1989/90	7 January 1990	SL	(West Germany) Armin Bittner	(Austria) Bernhard Gstrein	(Switzerland) Paul Accola
30th	1990/91	21 December 1990	GS	(Italy) Alberto Tomba	(Switzerland) Urs Kälin	(Luxembourg) Marc Girardelli
30th	1990/91	22 December 1990	SL	(Norway) Ole Kristian Furuseth	(Sweden) Thomas Fogdö	(Austria) Thomas Stangassinger
31st	1991/92	4 January 1992	GS	(Italy) Sergio Bergamelli	(Switzerland) Hans Pieren	(Italy) Alberto Tomba
31st	1991/92	5 January 1992	SL	(Italy) Alberto Tomba	(Germany) Armin Bittner	(Norway) Finn Christian Jagge
32nd	1992/93	19 December 1992	SL	(Sweden) Thomas Fogdö	(Italy) Alberto Tomba	(Germany) Peter Roth
32nd	1992/93	20 December 1992	GS	(Luxembourg) Marc Girardelli	(Norway) Lasse Kjus	(Sweden) Fredrik Nyberg
33rd	1993/94	8 January 1994	GS	(Sweden) Fredrik Nyberg	(Italy) Matteo Belfrond	(Germany) Tobias Barnerssoi
33rd	1993/94	9 January 1994	SL	(Norway) Finn Christian Jagge	(Norway) Ole Kristian Furuseth	(Sweden) Thomas Fogdö
34th	1994/95	6 January 1995	GS	(Italy) Alberto Tomba	(Slovenia) Mitja Kunc (Norway) Harald Strand Nilsen	
35th	1995/96	21 December 1995	GS	(Norway) Lasse Kjus	(Switzerland) Michael von Grünigen	(Austria) Mario Reiter
35th	1995/96	22 December 1995	SL	(Italy) Alberto Tomba	(Slovenia) Jure Košir	(France) Sébastien Amiez
36th	1996/97	5 January 1997	GS	(Switzerland) Michael von Grünigen	(Austria) Siegfried Voglreiter	(Norway) Kjetil André Aamodt
36th	1996/97	6 January 1997	SL	(Austria) Thomas Sykora	(France) Sébastien Amiez	(Austria) Thomas Stangassinger
37th	1997/98	3 January 1998	GS	(Austria) Christian Mayer	(Austria) Hermann Maier	(Switzerland) Michael von Grünigen
37th	1997/98	4 January 1998	SL	(Austria) Thomas Sykora	(France) Pierrick Bourgeat	(Austria) Thomas Stangassinger
38th	1998/99	5 January 1999	GS	(Italy) Patrick Holzer	(Austria) Christian Mayer	(Austria) Hans Knauß
38th	1998/99	6 January 1999	SL	(Slovenia) Jure Košir	(Austria) Thomas Stangassinger	(Austria) Benjamin Raich
39th	1999/00	21 December 1999	SL	(Switzerland) Didier Plaschy	(Austria) Benjamin Raich	(Austria) Thomas Stangassinger
40th	2000/01	20 December 2000	GS	lack of snow; replaced in Bormio (21 December)		
40th	2000/01	21 December 2000	SL	lack of snow; replaced in Madonna di Campiglio (19 December)		
41st	2001/02	21 December 2001	GS	(Austria) Benjamin Raich	(United States) Bode Miller	(Switzerland) Didier Cuche
41st	2001/02	22 December 2001	SL	(France) Jean-Pierre Vidal	(Austria) Mario Matt	(Croatia) Ivica Kostelić
42nd	2002/03	4 January 2003	GS	(United States) Bode Miller	(Austria) Christian Mayer	(Finland) Sami Uotila
42nd	2002/03	5 January 2003	SL	(Croatia) Ivica Kostelić	(Austria) Rainer Schönfelder	(France) Jean-Pierre Vidal
43rd	2003/04	28 February 2004	GS	(United States) Bode Miller	(Italy) Alberto Schieppati	(Italy) Alexander Ploner
43rd	2003/04	29 February 2004	SL	(Norway) Truls Ove Karlsen	(Norway) Tom Stiansen	(Austria) Mario Matt
44th	2004/05	26 February 2005	GS	(Austria) Benjamin Raich	(Austria) Hermann Maier	(Finland) Kalle Palander
44th	2004/05	27 February 2005	SL	(Italy) Giorgio Rocca	(Sweden) André Myhrer	(Austria) Benjamin Raich
45th	2005/06	21 December 2005	GS	(Austria) Benjamin Raich	(Italy) Massimiliano Blardone	(Canada) Thomas Grandi
45th	2005/06	22 December 2005	SL	(Italy) Giorgio Rocca	(Canada) Thomas Grandi	(United States) Ted Ligety
46th	2006/07	3 March 2007	GS	(Austria) Benjamin Raich	(Canada) François Bourque	(Italy) Massimiliano Blardone
46th	2006/07	4 March 2007	SL	(Austria) Mario Matt	(Austria) Benjamin Raich	(Italy) Manfred Mölgg
47th	2007/08	8 March 2008	GS	(United States) Ted Ligety	(Italy) Manfred Mölgg	(Italy) Massimiliano Blardone
47th	2007/08	9 March 2008	SL	(Italy) Manfred Mölgg	(Croatia) Ivica Kostelić	(Austria) Marcel Hirscher
48th	2008/09	28 February 2009	GS	(United States) Ted Ligety	(Switzerland) Didier Cuche	(Italy) Massimiliano Blardone
48th	2008/09	1 March 2009	SL	(France) Julien Lizeroux	(Italy) Giuliano Razzoli	(Germany) Felix Neureuther
49th	2009/10	30 January 2010	GS	(Austria) Marcel Hirscher	(Norway) Kjetil Jansrud	(United States) Ted Ligety
49th	2009/10	31 January 2010	SL	(Austria) Reinfried Herbst	(Austria) Marcel Hirscher	(France) Julien Lizeroux
50th	2010/11	5 March 2011	GS	(Switzerland) Beat Feuz	(Canada) Erik Guay	(Austria) Michael Walchhofer
50th	2010/11	6 March 2011	SL	(Austria) Mario Matt	(United States) Nolan Kasper (Sweden) Axel Bäck	
51st	2011/12	10 March 2012	GS	(United States) Ted Ligety	(France) Alexis Pinturault	(Austria) Marcel Hirscher
51st	2011/12	11 March 2012	SL	(Sweden) André Myhrer	(Italy) Cristian Deville	(France) Alexis Pinturault
52nd	2012/13	9 March 2013	GS	(United States) Ted Ligety	(Austria) Marcel Hirscher	(France) Alexis Pinturault
52nd	2012/13	10 March 2013	SL	(Croatia) Ivica Kostelić	(Austria) Marcel Hirscher	(Austria) Mario Matt
53rd	2013/14	8 March 2014	GS	(United States) Ted Ligety	(Austria) Benjamin Raich	(Norway) Henrik Kristoffersen
53rd	2013/14	9 March 2014	SL	(Germany) Felix Neureuther	(Germany) Fritz Dopfer	(Norway) Henrik Kristoffersen
54th	2014/15	14 March 2015	GS	(France) Alexis Pinturault	(Austria) Marcel Hirscher	(France) Thomas Fanara
54th	2014/15	15 March 2015	SL	(Norway) Henrik Kristoffersen	(Italy) Giuliano Razzoli	(Sweden) Mattias Hargin
55th	2015/16	5 March 2016	GS	(Austria) Marcel Hirscher	(France) Alexis Pinturault	(Norway) Henrik Kristoffersen
55th	2015/16	6 March 2016	SL	(Austria) Marcel Hirscher	(Norway) Henrik Kristoffersen	(Italy) Stefano Gross
56th	2016/17	4 March 2017	GS	(Austria) Marcel Hirscher	(Norway) Leif Kristian Haugen	(Sweden) Matts Olsson
56th	2016/17	5 March 2017	SL	(Austria) Michael Matt	(Italy) Stefano Gross	(Germany) Felix Neureuther
57th	2017/18	3 March 2018	GS	(Austria) Marcel Hirscher	(Norway) Henrik Kristoffersen	(France) Alexis Pinturault
57th	2017/18	4 March 2018	SL	(Austria) Marcel Hirscher	(Norway) Henrik Kristoffersen	(Switzerland) Ramon Zenhäusern
58th	2018/19	9 March 2019	GS	(Norway) Henrik Kristoffersen	(Norway) Rasmus Windingstad	(Switzerland) Marco Odermatt
58th	2018/19	10 March 2019	SL	(Switzerland) Ramon Zenhäusern	(Norway) Henrik Kristoffersen	(Austria) Marcel Hirscher
59th	2019/20	14 March 2020	GS	cancelled due to COVID-19 pandemic		
59th	2019/20	15 March 2020	SL	cancelled due to COVID-19 pandemic		
60th	2020/21	13 March 2021	GS	(Switzerland) Marco Odermatt	(Switzerland) Loïc Meillard	(Austria) Stefan Brennsteiner
60th	2020/21	14 March 2021	SL	(France) Clément Noël	(France) Victor Muffat-Jeandet	(Switzerland) Ramon Zenhäusern
61st	2021/22	12 March 2022	GS	(Norway) Henrik Kristoffersen	(Norway) Lucas Braathen (Switzerland) Marco Odermatt	
61st	2021/22	13 March 2022	GS	(Norway) Henrik Kristoffersen	(Austria) Stefan Brennsteiner	(Switzerland) Marco Odermatt
62nd	2022/23	11 March 2023	GS	(Switzerland) Marco Odermatt	(France) Alexis Pinturault	(Norway) Henrik Kristoffersen
62nd	2022/23	12 March 2023	GS	(Switzerland) Marco Odermatt	(Norway) Henrik Kristoffersen	(France) Alexis Pinturault
63rd	2023/24	9 March 2024	GS	cancelled due to rain and warm temperatures		
63rd	2023/24	10 March 2024	SL	cancelled due to rain and warm temperatures		
64th	2024/25	1 March 2025	GS			
64th	2024/25	2 March 2025	SL			

=== Women ===
At the start of the season, women for the first and only time in the history of this competition, raced for the "Vitranc Cup".

Edition	Season	Date	Event	Winner	Second	Third
↓ FIS World Cup ↓
1st	1983/84	1 December 1983	SL	(Switzerland) Erika Hess	(United States) Tamara McKinney	(Poland) Małgorzata Tlałka

== Substitute events ==
Kranjska Gora replaced 6 cancelled men's events from other countries, which aren't considered Vitranc Cup events:

- 4 Mar 2016 – Henrik Kristoffersen won the Friday additional giant slalom. Venue replaced: Garmisch-Partenkirchen (GER).
- 29 Jan 2010 – Ted Ligety won the Friday additional giant slalom. Venue replaced: Adelboden (SUI).
- 20 Dec 2001 – Fredrik Nyberg won the Friday additional giant slalom. Venue replaced: Aspen (USA).
- 8 Mar 2000 – Christian Mayer won the extra giant slalom. Venue replaced: Adelboden (SUI).
- 6 Jan 1990 – Jonas Nilsson won the Saturday additional slalom. Venue replaced: Madonna di Campiglio (ITA).
- 3 Jan 1986 – Joël Gaspoz won the extra giant slalom. Venue replaced: Borovets (BUL).

== Multiple winners ==
With at least two wins or more.

Total	Skier	SL	GS
6	(Austria) Marcel Hirscher	2	4
5	(United States) Ted Ligety	0	5
5	(Italy) Alberto Tomba	3	2
4	(Austria) Benjamin Raich	4	0
4	(Norway) Henrik Kristoffersen	1	3
4	(Socialist Federal Republic of Yugoslavia) Bojan Križaj	3	1
3	(Luxembourg) Marc Girardelli	2	1
2	(Austria) Josef Stiegler	1	1
2	(France) Michel Arpin	2	0
2	(Spain) Francisco Fernández Ochoa	1	1
2	(Sweden) Ingemar Stenmark	1	1
2	(Austria) Thomas Sykora	2	0
2	(United States) Bode Miller	0	2
2	(Italy) Giorgio Rocca	2	0
2	(Austria) Mario Matt	2	0
2	(Croatia) Ivica Kostelić	2	0
2	(France) Joël Gaspoz	0	2

== Club5+ ==
In 1986, the elite Club5 was originally established by 5 prestigious and classic downhill organizers: Kitzbühel, Wengen, Garmisch, Val d’Isère and Val Gardena/Gröden, with the goal to bring alpine ski sports to the highest levels possible.

Later, over the years, other classic long-term organizers joined the now renamed Club5+: Alta Badia, Cortina, Kranjska Gora, Maribor, Lake Louise, Schladming, Adelboden, Kvitfjell, St.Moritz and Åre.
