= 6th Vitranc Cup (1967) =

1967 Alpine Skiing competition

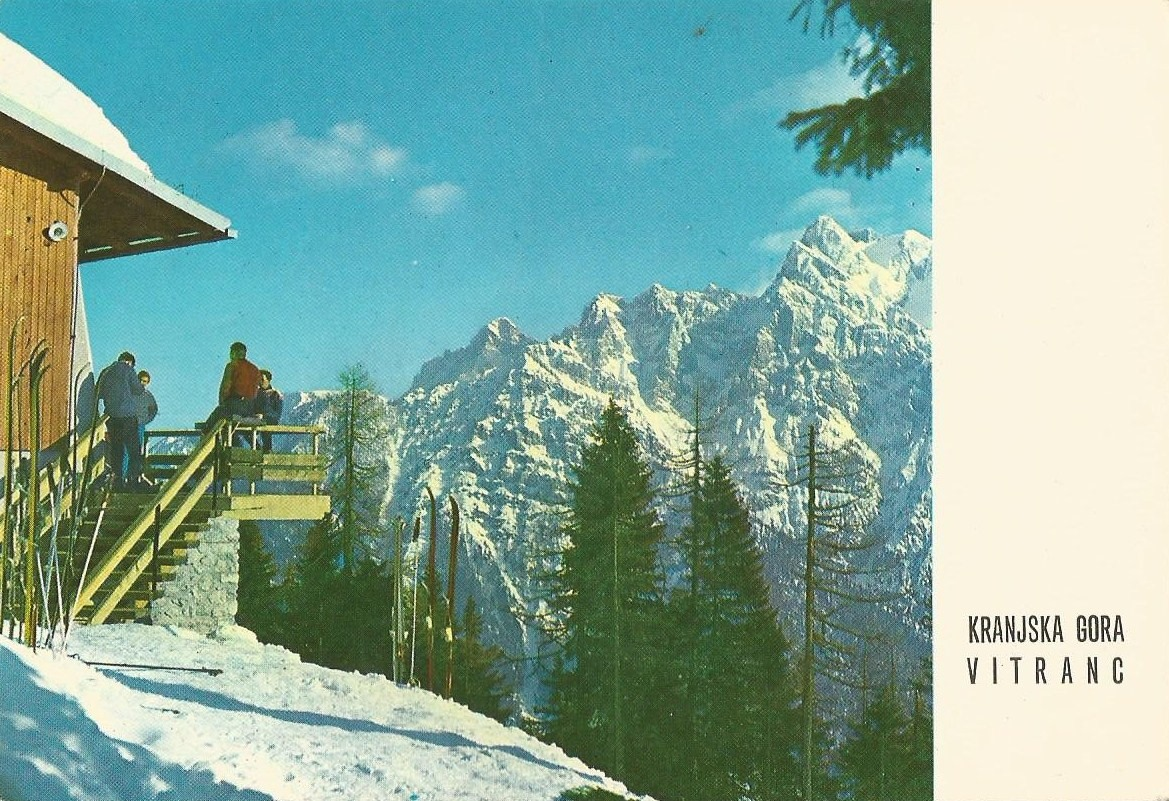
6th Vitranc Cup
Giant slalom
Date:	11 March 1967
Event:	FIS 1A International
Official list:	70
Ranked:	40
Course setter:	Marjan Magušar (YUG)
Gates:	67
Vertical drop:	435 m
Length:	1,560 m
Slalom
Date:	12 March 1967
Event:	FIS 1A International
Course setter 1:	Marjan Magušar (YUG)
Course setter 2:	Herman Derganz (AUT)
Gates (1st run):	70
Gates (2nd run):	69
Attendance:	1,000 people

6th Vitranc Cup was an alpine skiing competition, held between 11 and 12 March 1967 in Kranjska Gora, SR Slovenia, Yugoslavia. They were hosting two FIS 1A international events.

== Official results ==
=== Giant slalom ===
On 11 March, giant slalom at vertical drop at 435 metres was held.

Rank	Competitor	Time
1	(East Germany) Eberhard Riedel	1:56.79
2	(East Germany) Ernst Scherzer	1:58.90
3	(Austria) H. Stueffer	1:59.15
4	(Italy) Felice De Nicolo	1:59.29
5	(France) J. Jallifier	1:59.48
6	(West Germany) Ludwig Leitner	2:00.07
7	(Austria) H. Brunnmayer	2:02.01
8	(Switzerland) H. Zingre	2:02.68
9	(West Germany) Hans Jorg Schlager	2:02.72
10	(Austria) A. Alpiger	2:03:02
11	(Austria) Franz Schaller	2:03.33
12	(Switzerland) Mario Bergamin	2:04.00
13	(Japan) Y. Fukuhara	2:06.46
14	(France) Patrick Russel	2:04.67
15	(Austria) David Zwilling	2:05.22
16	(Socialist Federal Republic of Yugoslavia) Andrej Klinar	2:05.33
17	(Socialist Federal Republic of Yugoslavia) Blaž Jakopič	2:05.37
18	(Poland) Andrzej Dereziński	2:05.87
19	(Poland) Ryszard Ćwikła	2:07.15
20	(Socialist Federal Republic of Yugoslavia) Peter Lakota	2:07.52
21	(Socialist Federal Republic of Yugoslavia) Tone Vogrinec	2:07.59
22	(Switzerland) Adolf Rösti	2:08.17
23	(Socialist Federal Republic of Yugoslavia) Marko Kavčič	2.08.56
24	(Switzerland) M. Rominger	2:09.09
25	(Austria) P. Etschmann	2:09.37
26	(Bulgaria) P. Anguelov	2:09.64
27	(Austria) P. Beiler	2:09.93
28	(West Germany) F. Binder	2:10.84
29	(West Germany) Sch. Auer	2:10.97
30	(Japan) Tomio Sasaki	2:12.57
	(Austria) Gerhard Bechter	2:12.57
32	(Bulgaria) G. Atanasov	2:13.32
33	(Socialist Federal Republic of Yugoslavia) Andrej Soklič	2:13.48
34	(Austria) H. Kogler	2:13.93
35	(Hungary) Miklós Bartus	2:16.48
36	(Socialist Federal Republic of Yugoslavia) Marko Židan	2:16.72
37	(Socialist Federal Republic of Yugoslavia) Oto Pustoslemšek	2:16.93
38	(Switzerland) Bernhard Russi	2:18.07
39	(Socialist Federal Republic of Yugoslavia) Janez Lajbaher	2:18.47
40	(Socialist Federal Republic of Yugoslavia) Ljubo Majniger	2:29.73
5 competitors disqualified
25 competitors did not finish the race

=== Slalom ===
On 12 March, slalom was held.

Rank	Competitor	1st run	2nd run	Total
1	(France) Alain Blanchard	59.19	58.70	1:57.89
2	(Poland) Andrzej Bachleda	59.85	58.49	1:58.25
3	(France) Patrick Russel	59.97	59.68	1:59.65
4	(Austria) Stefan Sodat	59.87	60.06	1:59.93
5	(Poland) Bronislav Trzebunia	60.92	60.44	2:01.36
6	(East Germany) Ernst Scherzer	61.62	59.76	2:01.38
	(Switzerland) Kurt Huggler	61.99	59.39	2:01.38
8	(East Germany) Eberhard Riedel	60.42	61.03	2:01.45
9	(Socialist Federal Republic of Yugoslavia) Peter Lakota	59.49	62.17	2:01.66
10	(Austria) Franz Schaller	60.34	61.45	2:01.79
11	(Switzerland) Mario Bergamin	59.92	61.95	2:01.87
12	(Italy) Felice De Nicolo	62.06	60.67	2:02.73
13	(East Germany) Dieter Fersch	60.37	62.40	2:02.77
14	(West Germany) Heinz Weixelbaum	61.30	61.88	2:03.18
15	(Switzerland) A. Alpiger	61.32	62.63	2:03.95
16	(Japan) Y. Fukuhara	63.86	60.84	2:04.70
17	(Austria) David Zwilling	61.78	63.75	2:05.53
18	(Italy) Oswaldo Demetz	60.66	65.15	2:05.81
19	(Austria) H. Stueffer	60.89	65.01	2:05.90
20	(West Germany) Hans Jorg Schlager	65.57	62.69	2:08.26
21	(Austria) Josef Pechter	63.46	65.28	2:08.74
22	(Poland) Ryszard Ćwikła	62.48	66.59	2:09.07
23	(Austria) Herman Posautz	65.31	63.88	2:09.19
24	(Japan) Sasaki Tomio	62.95	66.30	2:09.25
25	(Austria) Gerhard Bechter	63.82	67.20	2:11.02
26	(Switzerland) M. Rominger	64.84	67.32	2:12.16
27	(Socialist Federal Republic of Yugoslavia) Andrej Klinar	66.26	66.20	2:12.46
28	(Socialist Federal Republic of Yugoslavia) Andrej Soklič	65.86	67.43	2:13.29
29	(Bulgaria) P. Anguelov	70.31	64.01	2:14.32
30	(Socialist Federal Republic of Yugoslavia) Miran Gašperšič	66.88	67.97	2:14.85
31	(Hungary) Andras Morotz	66.06	70.52	2:16.58
32	(Switzerland) René Berthod	72.52	66.09	2:18.61
33	(Switzerland) Adolf Rösti	64.22	97.70	2:41.92
	(Socialist Federal Republic of Yugoslavia) Blaž Jakopič	Did not finish		
	(Switzerland) H. Zingre	Did not finish		
	(Austria) H. Brunnmayer	Did not finish		
	(Bulgaria) G. Atanasov	Did not finish		
	(Switzerland) Kurt Schnider	Did not finish		
	(France) Mignon B. Rossat	Did not start		
	(Austria) Franz Rauter	Did not start		
