= Yugoslavia at the 1964 Winter Olympics =

- Flag of SFR Yugoslavia
- IOC code: YUG
- NOC: Yugoslav Olympic Committee

in Innsbruck
- Competitors: 31 (29 men, 2 women) in 4 sports
- Medals: Gold 0 Silver 0 Bronze 0 Total 0

Winter Olympics appearances (overview)
- 1924; 1928; 1932; 1936; 1948; 1952; 1956; 1960; 1964; 1968; 1972; 1976; 1980; 1984; 1988; 1992; 1994; 1998; 2002

Other related appearances
- Croatia (1992–pres.); Slovenia (1992–pres.); Bosnia and Herzegovina (1994–pres.); North Macedonia (1998–pres.); Serbia and Montenegro (1998–2006); Montenegro (2010–pres.); Serbia (2010–pres.); Kosovo (2018–pres.)

Athletes from the Socialist Federal Republic of Yugoslavia competed at the 1964 Winter Olympics in Innsbruck, Austria. Yugoslavia returned to the Winter Olympic Games after having missed the 1960 Winter Olympics.

== Alpine skiing ==
Men

Athlete	Event	Race	
Athlete	Event	Time	Rank
Oto Pustoslemšek	Downhill	2:44.77	62
Andrej Klinar	Downhill	2:39.79	55
Fric Detiček	Downhill	2:36.54	51
Peter Lakota	Downhill	2:27.82	29
Oto Pustoslemšek	Giant Slalom	2:22.46	67
Fric Detiček	Giant Slalom	2:11.76	50
Andrej Klinar	Giant Slalom	2:10.18	45
Peter Lakota	Giant Slalom	2:00.98	33

Men's slalom

Athlete	Qualifying				Final					
Athlete	Time 1	Rank	Time 2	Rank	Time 1	Rank	Time 2	Rank	Total	Rank
Andrej Klinar	DNF	–	DNF	–	did not advance					
Fric Detiček	DNF	–	1:05.08	43	did not advance					
Oto Pustoslemšek	1:13.82	71	DSQ	–	did not advance					
Peter Lakota	57.84	39	55.59	6 QF	1:18.59	33	1:07.65	31	2:26.24	32

Women

Athlete	Event	Race 1		Race 2		Total	
Athlete	Event	Time	Rank	Time	Rank	Time	Rank
Majda Ankele	Downhill					2:04.46	33
Krista Fanedl	Downhill					2:04.22	31
Krista Fanedl	Giant Slalom					2:10.76	37
Majda Ankele	Giant Slalom					2:01.81	25
Krista Fanedl	Slalom	DSQ	–	–	–	DSQ	–
Majda Ankele	Slalom	59.44	31	51.54	15	1:50.98	23

== Cross-country skiing ==
Men

Event	Athlete	Race	
Event	Athlete	Time	Rank
15 km	Mirko Bavče	DNF	–
15 km	Janko Kobentar	1'01:14.6	60
15 km	Cveto Pavčič	58:21.0	50
15 km	Roman Seljak	57:30.0	46
30 km	Janko Kobentar	1'45:04.7	50
30 km	Roman Seljak	1'42:44.4	45
30 km	Cveto Pavčič	1'42:44.0	44

Men's 4 × 10 km relay

Athletes	Race	
Athletes	Time	Rank
Roman Seljak; Mirko Bavče; Janko Kobentar; Cveto Pavčič	2'37:30.6	12

== Ice hockey ==
=== First round ===
Winners (in bold) qualified for the Group A to play for 1st-8th places. Teams, which lost their qualification matches, played in Group B for 9th-16th places.

Team 1	Score	Team 2
**Canada**	14–1	Yugoslavia

=== Consolation round ===
Rank	Team	Pld	W	L	T	GF	GA	Pts
9	Poland	7	6	1	0	40	13	12
10	Norway	7	5	2	0	40	19	10
11	Japan	7	4	2	1	35	31	9
12	Romania	7	3	3	1	31	28	7
13	Austria	7	3	3	1	24	28	7
14	Yugoslavia	7	3	3	1	29	37	7
15	Italy	7	2	5	0	24	42	4
16	Hungary	7	0	7	0	14	39	0

- Austria 6-2 Yugoslavia
- Yugoslavia 5-3 Italy
- Romania 5-5 Yugoslavia
- Yugoslavia 6-4 Japan
- Yugoslavia 4-2 Hungary
- Poland 9-3 Yugoslavia
- Norway 8-4 Yugoslavia

**Contestants**; Alex Andjelic; Miroljub Đorđević; Albin Felc; Anton Jože Gale; Mirko Holbus; Bogo Jan; Ivo Jan; Marijan Kristan; Miran Krmelj; Igor Radin; Ivo Ratej; Viktor Ravnik; Boris Renaud; Rašid Šemšedinović; Franc Smolej; Viktor Tišler; Vinko Valentar

== Ski jumping ==
Athletes performed three jumps, the best two were counted and are shown here.

Athlete	Event	Jump 1		Jump 2		Total	
Athlete	Event	Distance	Points	Distance	Points	Points	Rank
Božo Jemc	Normal hill	70.0	89.8	68.0	86.5	176.3	49
Peter Eržen	Normal hill	70.5	89.9	67.5	84.4	174.3	50
Miro Oman	Normal hill	70.0	93.3	69.0	87.6	180.9	47
Ludvik Zajc	Normal hill	72.5	95.6	72.0	95.6	191.2	39
Peter Eržen	Large hill	84.0	93.0	74.0	88.4	181.4	39
Ludvik Zajc	Large hill	84.0	91.5	78.5	88.6	180.1	42
Božo Jemc	Large hill	82.0	89.6	79.5	91.3	180.9	40
Miro Oman	Large hill	79.0	92.2	76.0	93.3	185.5	36
