= 3rd Vitranc Cup (1964) =

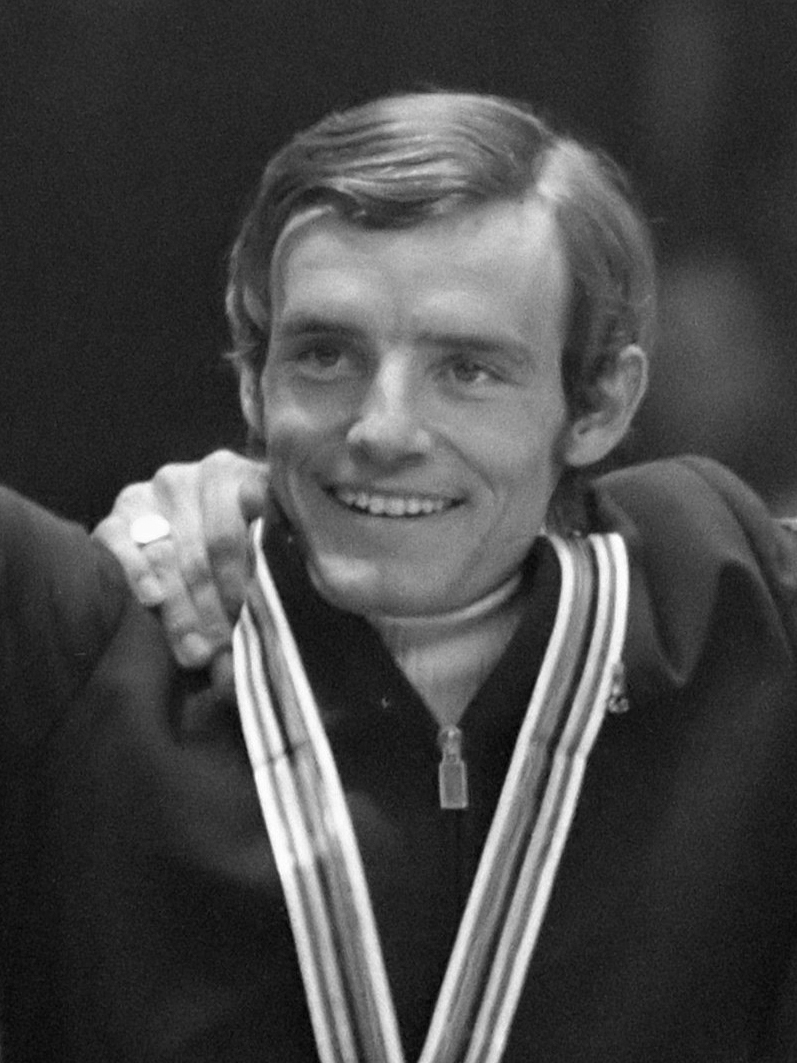
3rd Vitranc Cup
Jean-Claude Killy won his only Vitranc Cup
Giant slalom
Date:	29 February 1964
Event:	FIS 1A International
Official list:	56
Ranked:	38
Course setter:	Marjan Magušar (JUG)
Gates:	70
Start:	1.325 m
Finish:	830 m
Vertical drop:	495 m
Length:	1,850 m
Slalom
Date:	1 March 1964
Event:	FIS 1A International
Official list:	55
Ranked:	34
Course 1:	»Bedanc«
Course 2:	»Vitranc«
Course setter 1:	Nogler (ITA)
Course setter 2:	Marjan Magušar (JUG)
Gates (1st run):	59
Gates (2nd run):	70
Vertical drop:	160 m

3rd Vitranc Cup was an alpine skiing competition, held between 29 February–1 March 1964 in Kranjska Gora, SR Slovenia, Yugoslavia, hosting two FIS 1A international events.

== Official results ==
=== Giant slalom ===
On 29 February, giant slalom was held on 1,850 metres long course with vertical drop at 515 metres.

Rank	Competitor	Time
1	(France) Jean-Claude Killy	2:07.60
2	(Switzerland) Willy Favre	2:08.96
3	(Switzerland) Beat Von Allmen	2:10.74
4	(France) Michel Arpin	2:11.53
5	(United States) Jimmes Heuga	2:11.62
6	(East Germany) Peter Lutzendorf	2:12.39
7	(Austria) Franz Digruber	2:12.43
8	(Austria) Stefan Sodat	2:12.80
9	(East Germany) Ernst Scherzer	2:13.36
10	(France) Francois Jauffret	2:14.10
11	(Italy) Martino Fill	2:14.78
12	(France) Phillippe Mollard	2:16.40
13	(France) Michel Balmat	2:17.13
14	(Norway) Arild Holm	2:19.29
15	(East Germany) Klaus Illing	2:20.07
16	(Italy) Giorgio Malknecht	2:20.19
17	(Czech Republic) Jan Čermak	2:21.09
18	(Socialist Federal Republic of Yugoslavia) Peter Lakota	2:21.18
19	(Austria) Rudolf Bocek	2:23.80
20	(Austria) Franz Schaller	2:24.03
21	(Poland) Andrej Wala	2:26.35
22	(Socialist Federal Republic of Yugoslavia) Andrej Klinar	2:27.86
23	(Czech Republic) Vlastimil Horak	2:29.85
24	(Socialist Federal Republic of Yugoslavia) Tone Vogrinec	2:31.28
25	(Socialist Federal Republic of Yugoslavia) Oto Pustoslemšek	2:31.56
26	(Socialist Federal Republic of Yugoslavia) Janez Čop	2:32.82
27	(Socialist Federal Republic of Yugoslavia) Andrej Soklič	2:41.45
28	(Poland) Jan Muslajek	2:46.09
29	(Socialist Federal Republic of Yugoslavia) Stanko Klinar	2:46.63
30	(Hungary) Gyula Gazdig	2:47.14
31	(Hungary) Miklos Bartus	2:49.08
32	(Czech Republic) Jan Vojtech	2:49.72
33	(Hungary) Andras Morotz	2:49.78
34	(Socialist Federal Republic of Yugoslavia) Blaž Jakopič	2:50.83
35	(Socialist Federal Republic of Yugoslavia) Drago Fanedel	2:57.12
36	(Socialist Federal Republic of Yugoslavia) Jože Svetina	3:00.15
37	(Hungary) Andre Havas	3:14.33
38	(Italy) Oswaldo Demetz	3:36.18
18 were disqualified or DNF

=== Slalom ===
On 1 March, slalom was held on »Bedanc« (1st) and »Vitranc« (2nd) courses above Bukovnik meadow with vertical drop at 160 metres.

Rank	Competitor	1st run	2nd run	Total
1	(France) Michel Arpin	51.09	49.67	1:40.76
2	(Austria) Franz Digruber	50.77	50.01	1:40.78
3	(East Germany) Ernst Scherzer	51.87	50.02	1:41.89
4	(France) Francois Jauffret	51.12	51.26	1:42.38
5	(France) Georges Mauduit	52.55	50.26	1:42.81
6	(Italy) Martino Fill	52.65	50.62	1:43.27
7	(East Germany) Peter Lutzendorf	53.26	50.80	1:44.06
8	(East Germany) Eberhard Riedel	52.67	51.66	1:44.33
9	(Italy) Giorgio Malknecht	52.46	52.28	1:44.74
10	(France) Phillippe Mollard	52.72	52.33	1:45.05
11	(Norway) Arild Holm	53.25	52.02	1:45.27
12	(East Germany) Dieter Fersch	53.67	52.42	1:46.09
13	(Switzerland) Beat Von Allmen	53.53	53.87	1:47.40
14	(Switzerland) Willy Favre	51.46	56.09	1:47.55
15	(Socialist Federal Republic of Yugoslavia) Peter Lakota	53.92	54.39	1:48.31
16	(East Germany) Klaus Illing	55.25	53.61	1:48.86
17	(Austria) Rudolf Bocek	58.73	52.13	1:50.86
18	(Czechoslovakia) Jan Čermak	55.22	55.95	1:51.17
19	(Italy) Gualtier Mussner	55.46	56.06	1:51.52
20	(France) Roger Rossat Mignod	54.41	57.36	1:51.77
21	(East Germany) Heckelmuller	56.96	54.82	1:51.78
22	(France) Jean Paul Balmat	56.40	56.45	1:52.85
23	(Socialist Federal Republic of Yugoslavia) Andrej Klinar	57.03	57.26	1:54.29
24	(Switzerland) Jean Datwyler	59.19	57.13	1:56.32
25	(Socialist Federal Republic of Yugoslavia) Janez Čop	1:00.96	57.19	1:58.15
26	(Socialist Federal Republic of Yugoslavia) Mirko Klinar	1:00.14	58.03	1:58.17
27	(Socialist Federal Republic of Yugoslavia) Andrej Soklič	58.98	59.27	1:58.25
28	(Socialist Federal Republic of Yugoslavia) Oto Pustoslemšek	1:02.42	57.81	2:00.23
29	(Poland) Andrej Wala	58.25	1:02.61	2:00.86
30	(Czechoslovakia) Jan Vojtech	1:03.47	58.76	2:02.23
31	(Hungary) Andras Marotz	1:00.81	1:02.81	2:03.62
32	(Hungary) Andre Havas	1:01.83	1:02.17	2:04.00
33	(Poland) Zbigney Dziubian	1:03.16	1:07.18	2:10.34
34	(Hungary) Gyula Gazdig	1:07.64	1:13.30	2:20.94
21 competitors disqualified or DNF
