= 2nd Vitranc Cup (1963) =

Skiing competition

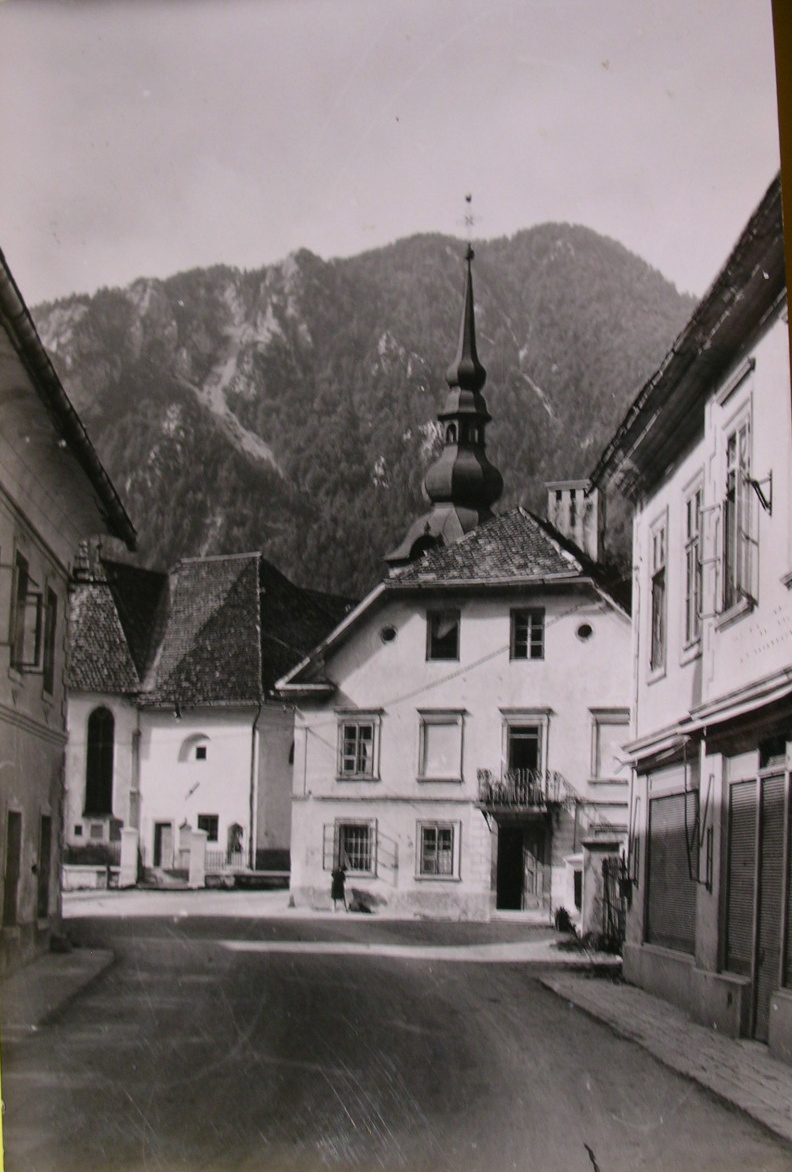
2nd Vitranc Cup
Giant slalom
Date:	2 March 1963
Event:	FIS 1A International
Official list:	39
Ranked:	37
Course setter:	Marijan Magušar (YUG)
Gates:	64
Start:	1,345 m
Finish:	845 m
Vertical drop:	510 m
Length:	2,100 m
Slalom
Date:	3 March 1963
Event:	FIS 1A International
Official list:	39
Ranked:	22
Course 1:	»Bedanc«
Course 2:	»Vitranc«
Course setter 1:	Alfred Amann (AUT)
Course setter 2:	Marijan Magušar (YUG)
Gates (1st run):	73
Gates (2nd run):	75
Vertical drop:	175 m
Attendance:	2,000

2nd Vitranc Cup was an alpine skiing competition, held between 2–3 March 1963 in Kranjska Gora, SR Slovenia, Yugoslavia. They were hosting two FIS 1A international events.

== Official results ==
=== Giant slalom ===
On 2 March 1963, GS with vertical drop at 510 m and 2,100 metres long was held. Marijan Magušar was coursesetter with 1 run and 64 gates. Start was at 6th pillar of the top chairlift (1,345 m), where family course joins with classic "Bukovnik downhill". Then it continued at the midpart of dowhnill course and then on the GS slope, above and over S-section, then direct to the finish line at Brsnina hayloft (845 m).

Rank	Competitor	Time
1	(France) Georges Mauduit	2:26.43
2	(Switzerland) Robert Grunenfelder	2:26.88
3	(France) Jean-Claude Killy	2:27.33
4	(Austria) Josef Stiegler	2:27.39
5	(Austria) Egon Zimmermann	2:27.78
6	(Austria) Hias Leitner	2:28.31
7	(Italy) Italo Pedroncelli	2:29.78
8	(Austria) Stefan Sodat	2:31.12
9	(Italy) Paride Milianti	2:31.40
10	(France) Jules Melquiond	2:33.03
11	(Switzerland) Werner Schmid	2:33.72
12	(Italy) Helmut Gartner	2:33.75
13	(Austria) Rudolf Bocek	2:33.95
14	(Switzerland) Stefan Kälin	2:34.14
15	(Switzerland) Albert Pitteloud	2:36.18
16	(Switzerland) Beat Von Allmen	2:36.60
17	(Socialist Federal Republic of Yugoslavia) Peter Lakota	2:36.75
18	(Austria) Gerhardt Fercher	2:38.79
19	(Socialist Federal Republic of Yugoslavia) Fric Detiček	2:40.25
20	(Italy) Franco Arrigoni	2:41.33
21	(Socialist Federal Republic of Yugoslavia) Janez Šumi	2:43.66
22	(Socialist Federal Republic of Yugoslavia) Tone Vogrinec	2:46.11
23	(Socialist Federal Republic of Yugoslavia) Franc Mrak	2:46.69
24	(Socialist Federal Republic of Yugoslavia) Oto Pustoslemšek	2:46.76
25	(Socialist Federal Republic of Yugoslavia) Jaka Šporn	2:47.76
26	(Socialist Federal Republic of Yugoslavia) Andrej Klinar	2:47.83
27	(United Kingdom) Aga Khan Karim	2:48.85
28	(Socialist Federal Republic of Yugoslavia) Anrej Soklič	2:51.22
29	(Socialist Federal Republic of Yugoslavia) Tomaž Jamnik	2:52.38
30	(Socialist Federal Republic of Yugoslavia) Jože Komac	2:53.32
31	(New Zealand) Paul Willis	2:53.87
32	(New Zealand) Graham Nevell	2:54.32
33	(United Kingdom) Jan McCormick	2:56.07
34	(Socialist Federal Republic of Yugoslavia) Gert Dogša	2:57.63
35	(New Zealand) Mark Saxton	2:59.16
36	(New Zealand) Tomas Huppert	3:01.35
37	(Socialist Federal Republic of Yugoslavia) Franjo Bahovec	3:02.37
	Gildo Siorpaes	DNF
	Francis Doran-Webb	DNF

=== Slalom ===
On 3 March 1963, slalom was held in front of 2,000 people. First run was held on "Bedanc" and second on "Vitranc" course, both with vertical drop 175 m.

Rank	Competitor	1st run	2nd run	Total
1	(Austria) Josef Stiegler	59.23	59.26	1:58.49
2	(France) Jean-Claude Killy	1:01.38	57.81	1:59.19
3	(Austria) Hias Leitner	1:02.56	56.95	1:59.51
4	(Switzerland) Robert Grunenfelder	1:01.19	1:01.07	2:02.26
5	(Italy) Paride Milianti	1:01.70	1:01.19	2:02.89
6	(Italy) Helmut Gartner	1:02.40	1:00.81	2:03.21
7	(Switzerland) Werner Schmid	1:01.96	1:01.41	2:03.37
8	(France) Georges Mauduit	1:04.00	1:00.09	2:04.09
9	(Austria) Rudolf Bocek	1:02.78	1:01.32	2:04.10
10	(Austria) Stefan Sodat	1:02.40	1:02.62	2:05.02
11	(Switzerland) Stefan Kälin	1:03.79	1:01.59	2:05.38
12	(Austria) Gerhardt Fercher	1:06.25	1:02.94	2:09.19
13	(Italy) Franco Arrigoni	1:06.23	1:05.03	2:11.26
14	(Switzerland) Beat Von Allmen	1:08.13	1:05.45	2:13.58
15	(Socialist Federal Republic of Yugoslavia) Janez Šumi	1:10.65	1:10.00	2:20.65
16	(United Kingdom) Aga Khan Karim	1:13.17	1:09.44	2:22.61
17	(Socialist Federal Republic of Yugoslavia) Oto Pustoslemšek	1:13.43	1:10.52	2:23.95
18	(Socialist Federal Republic of Yugoslavia) Tomaž Jamnik	1:12.26	1:11.93	2:24.19
19	(Socialist Federal Republic of Yugoslavia) Jože Komac	1:15.04	1:14.19	2:29.23
20	(Socialist Federal Republic of Yugoslavia) Anrej Soklič	1:19.38	1:14.55	2:33.93
21	(New Zealand) Paul Willis	1:19.66	1:19.29	2:38.95
22	(New Zealand) Thomas Huppert	1:16.83	1:22.92	2:39.75
	(France) Jules Melquinod	Disqualified		
	(Italy) Italo Pedroncelli	Disqualified		
	(Socialist Federal Republic of Yugoslavia) Peter Lakota	Disqualified		
	(Socialist Federal Republic of Yugoslavia) Friz Detiček	Disqualified		
	(Socialist Federal Republic of Yugoslavia) Andrej Klinar	Disqualified		
	(Socialist Federal Republic of Yugoslavia) Gert Dogša	Disqualified		
	(United Kingdom) Jan McCormick	Disqualified		
	(New Zealand) Mark Saxton	Disqualified		
	(Socialist Federal Republic of Yugoslavia) Franjo Bahovec	Disqualified		
	(Socialist Federal Republic of Yugoslavia) Franc Mrak	Disqualified		
	(Austria) Egon Zimmermann	Did not finish		
	(France) Albert Pitteloud	Did not finish		
	(Socialist Federal Republic of Yugoslavia) Tone Vogrinec	Did not finish		
	(New Zealand) Graham Nevell	Did not finish		
	(Socialist Federal Republic of Yugoslavia) Jakob Šporn	Did not finish		
	Gildo Siorpaes	Did not finish		
	Francis Doran-Webb	Did not finish		
