= 7th Vitranc Cup (1968) =

1967 Alpine Skiing competition

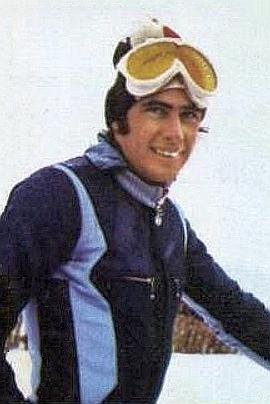
7th Vitranc Cup
Patrick Russel (FRA) won KG's 1st ever World Cup
Giant slalom
Date:	9 March 1968
Event:	FIS International
Official list:	48 or 49
Ranked:	38
Course setter:	Ludvik Dornig (YUG)
Gates:	79 or 81
Vertical drop:	540 m
Length:	2,200 m
Slalom
Date:	10 March 1968
Event:	FIS World Cup
Official list:	52 or 53
Ranked:	21
Course setter 1:	Peter Prodinger (AUT)
Course setter 2:	Marjan Magušar (YUG)
Gates (1st run):	67
Gates (2nd run):	69
Vertical drop:	180 m

7th Vitranc Cup was an alpine skiing competition, held between 9–10 March 1968 in Kranjska Gora, SR Slovenia, Yugoslavia, hosting FIS International event and premiere FIS World Cup event.

== Official results ==
On 9 March, FIS International giant slalom event was held.

=== Giant slalom ===
Rank	Competitor	Time
1	(Switzerland) Stefan Kälin	2:34.74
2	(Austria) Stefan Sodat	2:34.75
3	(Italy) Enrico Demetz	2:34.96
4	(Czechoslovakia) Jaroslav Janda	2:35.72
5	(Italy) Giuseppe Compagnoni	2:36.14
6	(Austria) Franz Digruber	2:36.63
7	(Switzerland) Josias Minsch	2:37.53
8	(West Germany) Friedrich Binger	2:37.76
9	(France) Jules Melquiond	2:38.57
10	(Czechoslovakia) Jan Čermak	2:39.81
11	(Socialist Federal Republic of Yugoslavia) Blaž Jakopič	2:39.94
12	(Austria) Ludvig Heber	2:41.07
13	(France) Georges Collomb-Patton	2:41.08
14	(Italy) Franco Bertod	2:41.52
15	(Austria) Gerhard Bechter	2:41.86
16	(West Germany) Klaus Kemser	2:42.02
17	(Austria) Franz Schaller	2:42.16
18	(Italy) Stefano Sibille	2:43.05
19	(Czechoslovakia) Jan Vojtech	2:43.07
20	(Socialist Federal Republic of Yugoslavia) Miran Gašperšič	2:43.68
21	(Socialist Federal Republic of Yugoslavia) Andrej Klinar	2:43.76
22	(Switzerland) Pablito Choffar	2:44.17
23	(Socialist Federal Republic of Yugoslavia) Jože Gazvoda	2:44.52
24	(Italy) Andrea Marro	2:44.77
25	(Switzerland) Laurenz Grunenfelder	2:46.23
26	(Switzerland) Alfred Witternwiller	2:46.55
27	(Austria) Danilo Samonig	2:47.73
28	(Socialist Federal Republic of Yugoslavia) Mirko Klinar	2:48.18
29	(Socialist Federal Republic of Yugoslavia) Marko Kavčič	2:51.38
30	(Socialist Federal Republic of Yugoslavia) Ljubo Majninger	2:52.08
31	(Socialist Federal Republic of Yugoslavia) Marko Židan	2:54.30
32	(Hungary) Andras Morotz	2:54.58
33	(Socialist Federal Republic of Yugoslavia) Gorazd Bedrač	2:55.29
34	(Socialist Federal Republic of Yugoslavia) Boris Pesjak	2:55.58
35	(Socialist Federal Republic of Yugoslavia) Jani Pogačnik	2:55.94
36	(Socialist Federal Republic of Yugoslavia) Dušan Lah	2:56.19
37	(Socialist Federal Republic of Yugoslavia) Jože Sevčnikar	2:58.62
38	(Hungary) Gyula Gazdig	2:59.96
	(West Germany) Maks Rieger	DSQ
	(West Germany) Josef Wurmer	DSQ
	(West Germany) Georg Sonnenberger	DSQ
	(France) Patrick Daniel Tambay	DNF
	(France) Francoise Roland Gay	DNF
	(Czechoslovakia) Josef Korman	DNF
	(France) Patrick Russel	DNF
	(Austria) Johan Hinterholzer	DNF
	(Socialist Federal Republic of Yugoslavia) Andrej Soklič	DNF
	(France) Jean Cristian Macchi	DNF
1 did not start or wasn't on official list

=== Slalom ===
On 10 March, the 1st ever FIS Alpine Ski World Cup event was held in the country.

Rank	Competitor	1st run	2nd run	Total
1	(France) Patrick Russel	50.89	56.52	1:47.41
2	(Austria) Franz Digruber	52.24	56.08	1:48.32
3	(Switzerland) Stefan Kälin	53.51	56.36	1:49.87
4	(Austria) N. Wendrer	52.92	57.24	1:50.16
5	(Austria) Stefan Sodat	54.21	56.62	1:50.83
6	(Socialist Federal Republic of Yugoslavia) Peter Lakota	54.69	57.17	1:51.86
7	(Austria) Johan Hinterholzer	55.35	56.60	1:51.95
8	(Austria) Franz Schaller	54.37	57.86	1:52.23
9	(Socialist Federal Republic of Yugoslavia) Blaž Jakopič	55.35	57.64	1:52.99
10	(West Germany) P. Gurber	56.52	57.75	1:54.27
11	(West Germany) Klaus Kemser	55.13	60.58	1:55.71
12	(Czechoslovakia) Jan Čermak	57.31	59.19	1:56.50
13	(Italy) Stefano Sibille	57.38	59.86	1:57.24
14	(Czechoslovakia) Jan Vojtech	56.94	60.46	1:57.40
15	(Switzerland) Alfred Witternwiller	58.76	61.98	2:00.74
16	(Socialist Federal Republic of Yugoslavia) Jože Gazvoda	58.85	1:02.88	2:01.73
17	(Socialist Federal Republic of Yugoslavia) Andrej Soklič	1:00.02	1:06.88	2:06.90
18	(Hungary) Gyula Gazdig	1:01.55	1:05.71	2:07.26
19	(Socialist Federal Republic of Yugoslavia) Gorazd Bedrač	1:04.68	1:05.93	2:10.61
20	(Socialist Federal Republic of Yugoslavia) Boris Pesjak	1:04.02	1:07.09	2:11.11
21	(Socialist Federal Republic of Yugoslavia) Dušan Lah	1:11.44	1:03.48	2:14.92
31 or 32 competitors disqualified or did not finish
