= 8th Vitranc Cup (1969) =

1967 Alpine Skiing competition

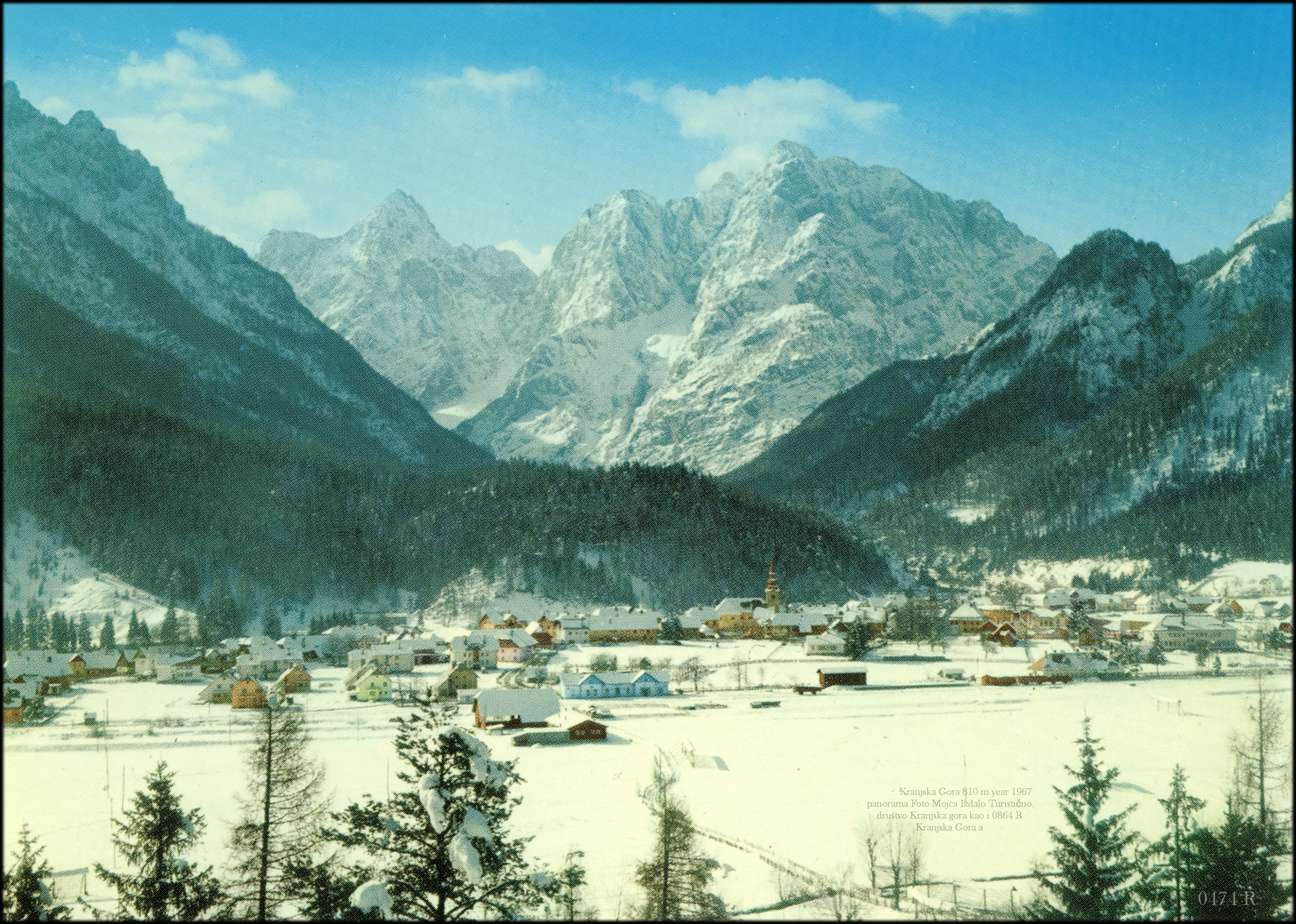
8th Vitranc Cup
Giant slalom
Date:	16 February 1969
Event:	FIS World Cup
Official list:	74
Ranked:	56
Course setter 1:	Marjan Magušar (YUG)
Course setter 2:	R. Sulpice (FRA)
Gates (1st run):	57
Gates (1st run):	56
Slalom
Date:	17 February 1969
Event:	FIS World Cup

8th Vitranc Cup was an alpine skiing competition, held from 16–17 February 1969 in Kranjska Gora, SR Slovenia, Yugoslavia. The event played host to two FIS World Cup events.

== Official results ==
=== Giant slalom ===
On 16 February, the giant slalom for the World Cup was held. For the first time ever, two rounds were held in the World Cup instead of one.

Rank	Competitor	1st run	2nd run	Total
1	(Austria) Reinhard Tritscher	1.25.22	1:27.11	2:52.33
2	(Austria) Alfred Matt	1:25.27	1:27.16	2:52.43
3	(Austria) Franz Digruber	1:26.00	1.27.30	2:53.30
4	(Switzerland) Edmund Bruggmann	1:25.59	1.27.75	2.53.34
5	(West Germany) Sepp Heokelmiller	1:25.55	1.28.04	2:53.59
6	(Austria) Karl Schranz	1:26.46	1.27.21	2:53.67
7	(United States) Spider Sabich	1:25.87	1:28.10	2:53.97
8	(Switzerland) Dumeng Giovanoli	1.26.01	1.28.06	2:54.07
9	(Poland) Andrzej Bachleda	1:26.65	1.27.47	2:54.12
10	(France) Alain Penz	1:27.16	1:27.96	2:55.12
11	(Austria) Harald Forner	1:26.28	1:29.08	2:55.36
12	(France) Patrick Russel	1:26.67	1:28.79	2:55.46
13	(Austria) Werner Bleiner	1:26.99	1.28.49	2.55.48
14	(Austria) Rudi Sailer	1.27.88	1:27.86	2:55.74
15	(Austria) Herbert Huber	1:26.72	1:29.03	2:55.75
16	(West Germany) Franz Vogler	1:27.48	1:28.58	2:56.06
17	(Austria) Heini Messner	1:27.52	1:28.63	2:56.15
18	(Italy) Giuseppe Compagnoni	1:27.56	1:28.70	2:56.26
19	(France) Jean Pierro Augert	1:25.90	1:30.42	2:56.32
20	(France) Georges Mauduit	1:26.67	1:29.67	2:36.43
21	(West Germany) Maks Rieger	1:27.84	1:28.85	2:56.67
22	(Switzerland) Bernhard Russi	1.26.94	1:29.87	2:56.81
23	(France) Henri Bréchu	1.26.62	1:30.25	2:56.87
24	(Austria) David Zwilling	1:26.89	1:30.12	2:57.01
25	(France) Jean Louis Ambroise	1:27.04	1:30.06	2:57.10
26	(Italy) Pierlorenzo Clataud	1:28.30	1:28.94	2.57.24
27	(Austria) Gerhard Riml	1:27.81	1:29.45	2:57.26
28	(Italy) Bruno Pizzalunga	1:28.07	1:29.51	2:57.58
29	(Italy) Felice De Nicolo	1:27.54	1:30.20	2:57.74
30	(Sweden) Bengt Erik Grahn	1:28.61	1:29.17	2:57.78
31	(West Germany) Christian Neureuther	1:27.97	1:30.22	2:58.19
32	(Italy) Renzo Zandegiacomo	1:28.18	1:30.11	2:58.29
33	(Switzerland) P. Frei	1:28.17	1:30.14	2:58.31
34	(Sweden) Anders Hansson	1:29.21	1:30.78	2:59.99
35	(Italy) M. Stefani	1:28.56	1.32.06	3:00.62
36	(Czechoslovakia) Jan Vojtech	1:29.02	1:31.98	3:01.00
37	(Switzerland) Mario Bergamin	1:29.53	1:31.71	3.01.24
38	(West Germany) Georg Sonnenberger	1:28.73	1:32.56	3:01.29
39	(Socialist Federal Republic of Yugoslavia) Blaž Jakopič	1:29.64	1:33.03	3:02.67
40	(Czechoslovakia) Jan Čermak	1:30.14	1:32.65	3:02.79
41	(Socialist Federal Republic of Yugoslavia) Jože Gazvoda	1.30.16	1:32.81	3:02.97
42	(Socialist Federal Republic of Yugoslavia) Andrej Klinar	1:31.45	1:33.80	3:05.25
43	(Argentina) Ruben Macaya	1:31.95	1:34.13	3:06.08
44	(Norway) Per Sunde	1:33.08	1:34.40	3:07.48
45	(Poland) Bronislav Trzebunia	1:31.82	1.36.50	3:08.32
46	(United Kingdom) Royston Varley	1:33.44	1:35.31	3:08.75
47	(Sweden) Per Olof Richardsson	1:33.65	1:35.19	3:08.84
48	(United Kingdom) Julien Vasey	1:33.88	1:36.22	3:10.10
49	(Socialist Federal Republic of Yugoslavia) Cena Štravs	1:35.26	1:37.99	3:13.25
50	(Czechoslovakia) Pavel Raclavski	1:34.52	1:39.15	3:13.67
51	(Socialist Federal Republic of Yugoslavia) Boris Pesjak	1:36.62	1:37.99	3:14.61
52	(Socialist Federal Republic of Yugoslavia) Miran Gašperšič	1:41.36	1.33.56	3:14.92
53	(Socialist Federal Republic of Yugoslavia) Tone Albreht	1:35.90	1:40.89	3:16.79
54	(Socialist Federal Republic of Yugoslavia) Jože Sevčnikar	1:39.37	1:38.64	3:18.01
55	(West Germany) Ernst Schmid	1:46.09	1.33.36	3:19.45
56	(Switzerland) Jakob Tischhauser	1.54.02	1.27.93	3:21.95
	(Socialist Federal Republic of Yugoslavia) Dušan Javnik	Did not finish		
	(Czechoslovakia) Josef Korman	Did not finish		
	(United Kingdom) Jonathan Latiner	Did not finish		
	(Italy) Claudio Detassis	Did not finish		
	(Switzerland) Andreas Sprecher	Did not finish		
	(Switzerland) Kurt Schnider	Did not finish		
	(Switzerland) Walter Tresch	Did not finish		
	(Poland) Ryszard Cwikla	Did not start		
	(Sweden) Anders Hansson	Did not start		
	(Sweden) Sven Mikaelsson	Did not start		
	(France) Jean Pierro Augert	Disqualified		
	(Poland) Tadeusz Kaim	Disqualified		
	(France) Guy Perillatt	Disqualified		
	(France) Mignon B. Rossat	Disqualified		
	(France) Jules Melquiond	Disqualified		
	(Italy) Eberardo Schmalzl	Disqualified		
	(West Germany) Erhand Strohmeier	Disqualified		
	(Socialist Federal Republic of Yugoslavia) Marko Židan	Disqualified		

=== Slalom ===
The slalom event was held on 17 February.
