= 1st Vitranc Cup (1961) =

Skiing competition

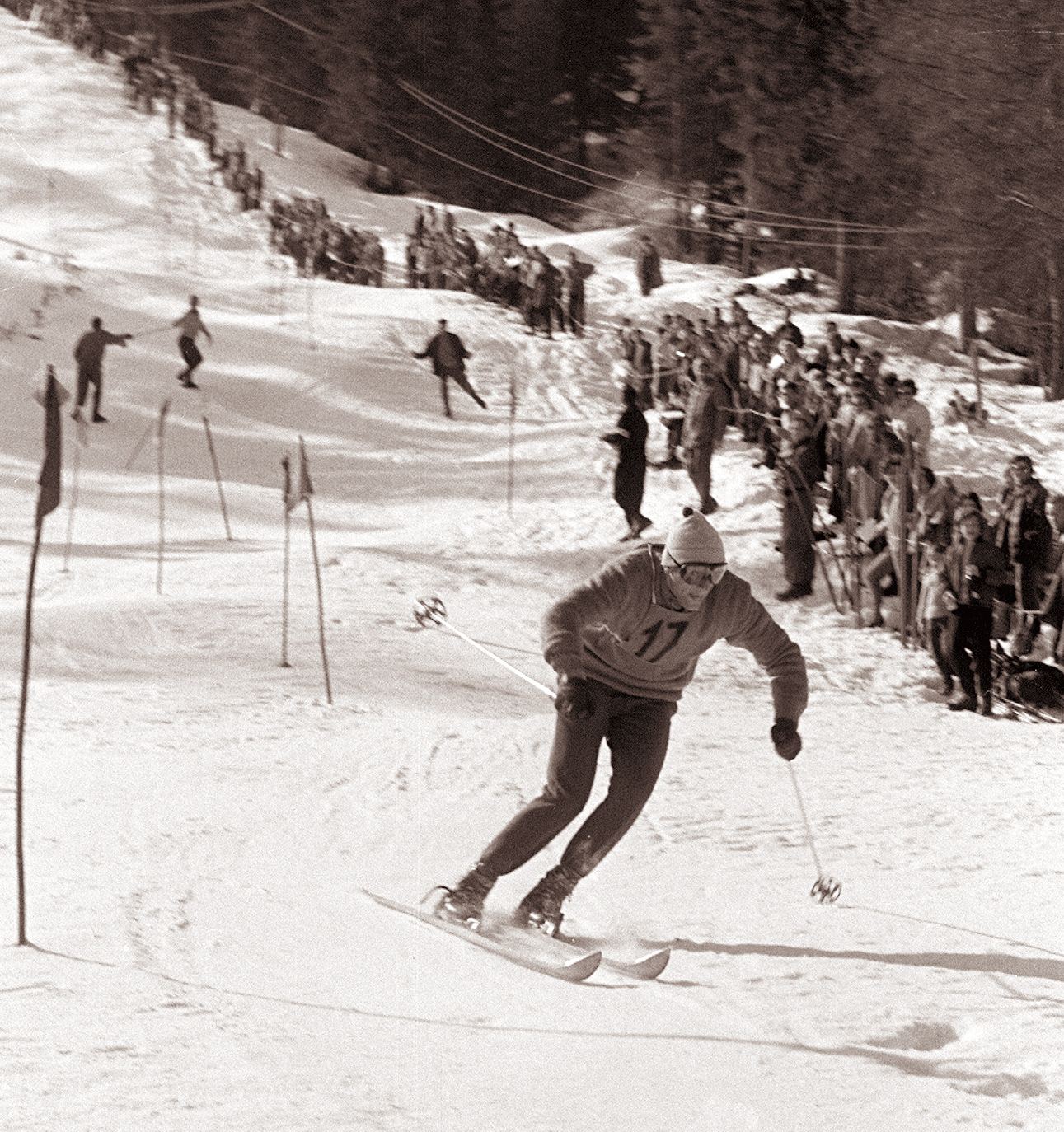
1st Vitranc Vitranc
Giant slalom
Date:	4 March 1961
Event:	FIS 1A International
Official list:	44
Ranked:	35
Course setter:	Marjan Magušar (YUG)
Gates:	65
Start:	1,552 m
Finish:	1,035 m
Vertical drop:	517 m
Course length:	< 2,000 m
Attendance:	10,000
Slalom
Date:	5 March 1961
Event:	FIS 1A International
Official list:	43
Ranked:	31
Course setter 1:	Marjan Magušar (YUG)
Course setter 2:	Jan Plonka (POL)
Gates (1st run):	65
Gates (2nd run):	69
Vertical drop:	180 m
Attendance:	10,000

1st Vitranc Cup was an alpine skiing competition, held between 4–5 March 1961 in Kranjska Gora, SR Slovenia, Yugoslavia. They were hosting two FIS 1A international events.

== Official results ==
=== Giant slalom ===
On 4 March 1961, giant slalom with only one run, was held as Vitranc Cup premiere event. Start was at the top of the Vitranc mountain (1,552 m) and with finish line at "Bukovnik meadow" (1,035 m).

The upper part of the course was extremely steep and dangerous, brutally demanding and also known as "hara-kiri with acceleration". That's why it was never used again and moved lower ever since.

Rank	Competitor	Time
1	(Austria) Josef Stiegler	2:17.1
2	(West Germany) Joseph Behr	2:19.6
3	(Italy) Helmut Gartner	2:22.1
4	(Poland) Wladomir Czarniak	2:23.3
5	(Switzerland) Albert Pitteloud	2:23.7
	(Austria) Herman Muckenschnabl	2:23.7
7	(Italy) Gateano Coppi	2:24.8
8	(Italy) Enrico Senoner	2:25.2
9	(Switzerland) Walter Herwig	2:26.6
10	(Germany) Gunter Leis	2:27.2
11	(Norway) Arild Holm	2:27.6
12	(Switzerland) Hans Marki	2:28.4
13	(Socialist Federal Republic of Yugoslavia) Peter Lakota	2:28.8
14	(Italy) Edoard Agraiter	2:29.5
15	(Germany) Josef Wurmer	2:29.6
16	(Austria) Ernst Falch	2:30.5
17	(Germany) Alois Glanner	2:31.1
	(Germany) Fritz Fassler	2:31.1
19	(Poland) Bronislav Trzebunta	2:31.6
20	(Socialist Federal Republic of Yugoslavia) Janez Šumi	2:32.2
21	(Sweden) Kjell Holmberg	2:34.7
22	(Socialist Federal Republic of Yugoslavia) Boris Limovšek	2:34.8
23	(Poland) Roman Sobanski	2:35.0
24	(Socialist Federal Republic of Yugoslavia) Tomaž Jamnik	2:38.5
	(Switzerland) Hans Gegenschatz	2:38.5
26	(Switzerland) Bruno Forrer	2:44.2
27	(Socialist Federal Republic of Yugoslavia) Jože Nograšek	2:49.3
28	(Socialist Federal Republic of Yugoslavia) Tone Navodnik	2:51.1
29	(Socialist Federal Republic of Yugoslavia) Jaka Šporn	2:51.8
30	(Socialist Federal Republic of Yugoslavia) Peter Križaj	2:52.9
31	(Socialist Federal Republic of Yugoslavia) Vinko Švab	2:55.6
32	(Socialist Federal Republic of Yugoslavia) Tone Vogrinec	2:58.4
33	(Socialist Federal Republic of Yugoslavia) Ivica Modrič	2:59.5
34	(Socialist Federal Republic of Yugoslavia) Stanislav Markulin	3:05.7
35	(Socialist Federal Republic of Yugoslavia) Andrej Klinar	3:07.2
	(Austria) Helmuth Schranz	DSQ
	(Switzerland) Albert Pitteloud	DSQ
	(Poland) Stefan Marek	DSQ
	(Austria) Egon Zimmermann	DNF
	(Socialist Federal Republic of Yugoslavia) Ludvik Dornig	DNF
	(Poland) Andrzej Pawlovicz	DNF
	(Socialist Federal Republic of Yugoslavia) Drago Jemc	DNF
	(Socialist Federal Republic of Yugoslavia) Branko Lebe	DNF
	(Socialist Federal Republic of Yugoslavia) Stanko Frantar	DNF

=== Slalom ===
On 5 March 1961, slalom was held in front of 10,000 people.

Rank	Competitor	1st run	2nd run	Total
1	(Austria) Ernst Falch	1:02.3	1:05.0	2:07.3
2	(Austria) Josef Stiegler	1:05.1	1:05.3	2:10.4
3	(Austria) Helmut Schranz	1:02.6	1:07.9	2:10.5
4	(Italy) Helmut Gartner	1:07.3	1:07.0	2:14.3
5	(West Germany) Joseph Behr	1:06.0	1:09.2	2:15.2
6	(Norway) Arild Holm	1:06.7	1:10.5	2:17.2
7	(Austria) Herman Muckenschnalbl	1:06.5	1:11.3	2:17.8
8	(Switzerland) Walter Herwig	1:07.6	1:10.4	2:18.0
9	(Poland) Bronislav Trzebunia	1:08.8	1:10.4	2:19.2
10	(West Germany) Alois Glanner	1:09.0	1:11.9	2:20.9
11	(Poland) Roman Sobanski	1:09.3	1:12.3	2:21.6
12	(Socialist Federal Republic of Yugoslavia) Peter Križaj	1:08.9	1:13.0	2:21.9
13	(Italy) Gateano Coppi	1:11.0	1:12.4	2:23.4
14	(West Germany) Gunter Leis	1:07.2	1:16.9	2:24.2
15	(Socialist Federal Republic of Yugoslavia) Boris Limovšek	1:11.2	1:14.2	2:25.4
16	(Italy) Edoard Agraiter	1:12.3	1:13.2	2:25.5
17	(Socialist Federal Republic of Yugoslavia) Peter Lakota	1:13.4	1:12.4	2:25.8
18	(Sweden) Kjell Holmberg	1:14.6	1:11.3	2:25.9
19	(Socialist Federal Republic of Yugoslavia) Janez Šumi	1:12.2	1:14.0	2:26.2
20	(Poland) Andrzej Pawlowicz	1:13.1	1:15.4	2:28.5
21	(Switzerland) Hans Marki	1:07.7	1:23.8	2:31.5
22	(Switzerland) Albert Pitteloud	1:24.2	1:08.9	2:33.1
23	(Socialist Federal Republic of Yugoslavia) Jože Nograšek	1:16.5	1:18.8	2:35.3
24	(Poland) Stefan Marek	1:22.4	1:14.2	2:36.6
25	(Socialist Federal Republic of Yugoslavia) Ljubo Rakovič	1:17.8	1:23.0	2:40.8
26	(Switzerland) Hans Gegenschatz	1:23.6	1:19.2	2:42.8
27	(Socialist Federal Republic of Yugoslavia) Branko Lebe	1:19.5	1:23.5	2:43.0
28	(West Germany) Fritz Fassler	1:19.7	1:24.4	2:44.5
29	(Socialist Federal Republic of Yugoslavia) Stanislav Markulin	1:22.5	1:26.6	2:49.1
30	(Socialist Federal Republic of Yugoslavia) Tone Navodnik	1:35.3	1:24.9	3:00.2
31	(Socialist Federal Republic of Yugoslavia) Tone Vogrinec	1:34.6	1:33.2	3:07.8
	(Italy) Enrico Senoner	Disqualified		
	(Socialist Federal Republic of Yugoslavia) Tomaž Jamnik	Disqualified		
	(Socialist Federal Republic of Yugoslavia) Ludvik Dornig	Disqualified		
	(Socialist Federal Republic of Yugoslavia) Vinko Švab	Disqualified		
	(Poland) Wladomir Czarniak	Did not finish		
	(West Germany) Josef Wurmer	Did not finish		
	(Switzerland) Albert Pitteloud	Did not finish		
	(Switzerland) Bruno Forrer	Did not finish		
	(Socialist Federal Republic of Yugoslavia) Ivica Modrič	Did not finish		
	(Socialist Federal Republic of Yugoslavia) Jaka Šporn	Did not finish		
	(Socialist Federal Republic of Yugoslavia) Andrej Klinar	Did not finish		
	(Socialist Federal Republic of Yugoslavia) Milan Bernik	Did not finish		
