= Gazvoda =

Gazvoda is a Slovenian surname. Notable people with the surname include:

- Gregor Gazvoda (born 1981), Slovenian cyclist
- Jože Gazvoda (born 1949), Slovenian skier
- Nejc Gazvoda (born 1985), Slovenian writer, screenwriter, and director
