= Klinar =

Klinar is a Slovenian surname. Notable people with the surname include:

- Andrej Klinar (1942–2011), Slovenian alpine skier
- Anja Klinar (born 1988), Slovenian swimmer
- Denis Klinar (born 1992), Slovenian footballer
