= 1971–72 FIS Alpine Ski Europa Cup =

Alpine skiing competition

Discipline	Men	Women
Overall	(Italy) Ilario Pegorari	(France) Fabienne Serrat
Downhill	(Austria) Kurt Engstler	(France) Brigitte Jeandel
Giant Slalom	(Austria) Hubert Berchtold	(Austria) Irmgard Lukasser
Slalom	(Italy) Giulio Corradi	(France) Fabienne Serrat

Competition

1971–72 FIS Alpine Ski Europa Cup was the first season of the FIS Alpine Ski Europa Cup, eight to ten races per discipline were held for women and men. The final took place in Arosa in Switzerland. In contrast to the World Cup, the top 15 runners in each race received points according to the scheme 25-22-20-18-16-14-12-10-8-6-5-4-3-2-1.

== Standings ==
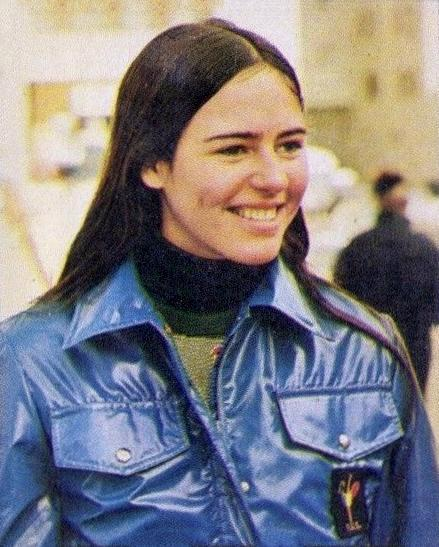
Fabienne Serrat, the winner of the women's Europa Cup.

=== Overall ===
Men

Rank	Skier	Country	Points
1	Ilario Pegorari	Italy	240
2	Hubert Berchtold	Austria	222
3	Renzo Zandegiacomo	Italy	163
4	Giulio Corradi	Italy	144
5	Eberhard Schmalzl	Italy	110
6	Johann Kniewasser	Austria	103
7	Piero Gros	Italy	97
8	Franz Bracket	Austria	91
9	Werner Mattle	Switzerland	88
10	Kurt Engstler	Austria	80

Women

Rank	Skier	Country	Points
1	Fabienne Serrat	France	212
2	Anneliese Leibetseder	Austria	192
3	Irmgard Lukasser	Austria	188
4	Christine Rolland	France	150
5	Odile Chalvin	France	141
6	Sigrid Eberle	Austria	122
7	Hanni Wenzel	Liechtenstein	109
8	Patricia Emonet	France	103
9	Gerti Engensteiner	Austria	92
10	Elena Matous	Italy	89

=== Downhill ===
Men

Rank	Skier	Country	Points
1	Kurt Engstler	Austria	80
2	Rainulf Lemberger	Austria	64
3	Ilario Pegorari	Italy	55

Women

Rank	Skier	Country	Points
1	Brigitte Jeandel	France	56
2	Irmgard Lukasser	Austria	54
3	Anneliese Leibetseder	Austria	45

=== Giant Slalom ===
Men

Rank	Skier	Country	Points
1	Hubert Berchtold	Austria	102
2	Ilario Pegorari	Italy	93
3	Renzo Zandegiacomo	Italy	92

Women

Rank	Skier	Country	Points
1	Irmgard Lukasser	Austria	100
2	Fabienne Serrat	France	82
2	Anneliese Leibetseder	Austria	82

=== Slalom ===
Men

Rank	Skier	Country	Points
1	Giulio Corradi	Italy	97
2	Ilario Pegorari	Italy	92
3	Hubert Berchtold	Austria	70

Women

Rank	Skier	Country	Points
1	Fabienne Serrat	France	103
2	Odile Chalvin	France	92
3	Helene Graswander	Austria	71
