= Roman Seljak =

Slovenian cross-country skier

Personal information
- Nationality: Slovenian
- Born: 27 September 1934 Žiri, Yugoslavia
- Died: 8 April 1994 (aged 59) Kranj, Slovenia

Sport
- Sport: Cross-country skiing

Roman Seljak (27 September 1934 – 8 April 1994) was a Slovenian cross-country skier. He competed in the men's 15 kilometre event at the 1964 Winter Olympics.
