= Cveto Pavčič =

Slovenian cross-country skier

Personal information
- Nationality: Slovenian
- Born: 15 April 1933 (age 91); Dolenja Vas, Yugoslavia

Sport
- Sport: Cross-country skiing

Cveto Pavčič (born 15 April 1933) is a Slovenian cross-country skier. He competed at the 1956 Winter Olympics and the 1964 Winter Olympics.
