= Hubert Berchtold =

Austrian alpine skier

Personal information
- Born: 28 July 1950 (age 75) Alberschwende, Austria

Skiing career
- Sport: Alpine skiing
- Club: SC Alberschwende
- Retired: 1976
- Disciplines: Technical events
- World Cup debut: 1973

World Cup
- Seasons: 4
- Wins: 1
- Podiums: 1

Hubert Berchtold (born 28 July 1950) is a former Austrian alpine skier who won a race in the World Cup.

== Career ==
During his career he has achieved 6 results among the top 10 (1 podium: a victory) in the World Cup.

== World Cup results ==
Top 10

Date	Place	Discipline	Rank
02-03-1975	(Canada) Garibaldi	Giant slalom	8
23-02-1975	(Japan) Naeba	Giant slalom	10
21-02-1975	(Japan) Naeba	Slalom	10
05-12-1974	(France) Val d'Isere	Giant slalom	10
16-12-1973	(Austria) Saalbach-Hinterglemm	Giant slalom	1
19-01-1973	(France) Megeve	Giant slalom	6

== Europa Cup results ==
Berchtold has won a Europa Cup discipline cup.

- FIS Alpine Ski Europa Cup
  - Giant slalom: 1972
