= Ilario Pegorari =

Italian alpine skier (1949–1982)

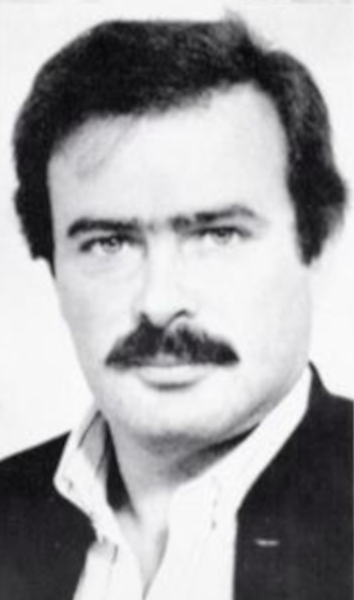
Ilario Pegorar

Ilario Pegorari (9 January 1949 – 17 August 1982) was an Italian alpine skier.

== Career ==
Pegorari was twice Italian champion (Slalom 1972, Combined 1973). Best results were a 2nd place (Slalom Mt. St. Anne/4 March 1973) and a third place (Slalom Naeba/13 March 1973).

== Death ==
While visiting Mount Tongariro on a day off from training, Pegorari died in a car accident, along with skier Bruno Nöckler and several others.
