= Janko Kobentar =

Slovenian cross-country skier

Personal information
- Nationality: Slovenian
- Born: 1 April 1940 (age 84); Hrušica, Yugoslavia

Sport
- Sport: Cross-country skiing

Janko Kobentar (born 1 April 1940) is a Slovenian cross-country skier. He competed in the men's 15 kilometre event at the 1964 Winter Olympics.
