= Werner Schmid =

Werner Schmid may refer to:

- Werner Schmid (pentathlete) (1919–2005), German pentathlete
- Werner Schmid (field hockey) (born 1933), German field hockey player

== See also ==
- Werner Schmidt
