= Krista Fanedl =

Slovenian alpine skier (born 1941)

Personal information
- Nationality: Slovenian
- Born: 1 August 1941 (age 85) Maribor, Yugoslavia

Sport
- Sport: Alpine skiing

Krista Fanedl Dekleva (born 1 August 1941) is a Slovenian alpine skier. She competed in three events at the 1964 Winter Olympics, representing Yugoslavia.
