= Mirko Bavče =

Slovenian cross-country skier

Personal information
- Nationality: Slovenian
- Born: 15 July 1942 (age 82); Prevalje, Yugoslavia

Sport
- Sport: Cross-country skiing

Mirko Bavče (born 15 July 1942) is a Slovenian cross-country skier. He competed at the 1964 Winter Olympics and the 1968 Winter Olympics.
