= Bruno Nöckler =

Italian alpine skier

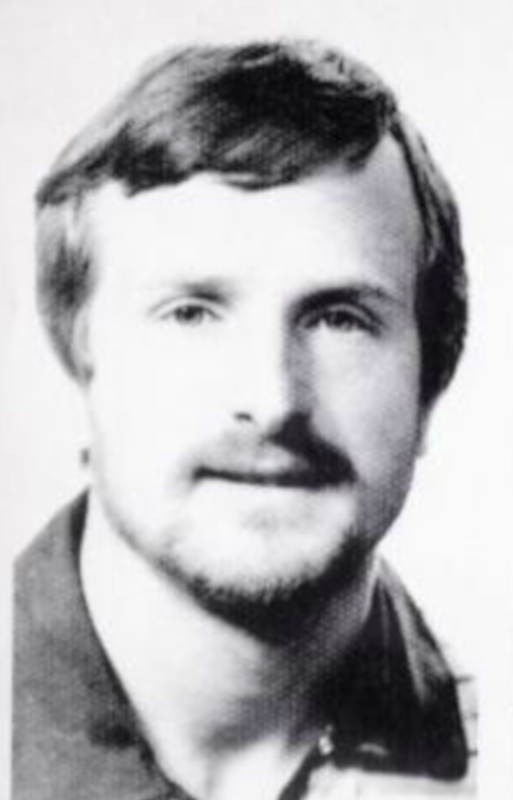

Personal information
- Born: 6 October 1956 Prettau, Italy
- Died: 16 August 1982 (aged 25) Ruapehu, New Zealand

Skiing career
- Sport: Alpine skiing
- Retired: 1982
- Disciplines: Technical events
- World Cup debut: 1976

Olympics
- Teams: 1
- Medals: 0

World Championships
- Teams: 3
- Medals: 0

World Cup
- Seasons: 7
- Podiums: 2

Bruno Nöckler (6 October 1956 – 17 August 1982) was an Italian alpine skier who competed in the 1980 Winter Olympics at Lake Placid, where he finished in sixth place overall in the giant slalom.

== Career ==
In World Cup racing, he finished on the podium twice – in third place in the slalom on 27 February 1977 in Furano, Japan and in the giant slalom on 11 February 1981 in Voss Municipality, Norway. At World Championships Schladming 1982, Nöckler finished 5th in giant slalom. His best results in Alpine World Cup: 3rd - Slalom Furano 27 February 1977, 4th – Giant slalom Aare 21 March 1977, 5th – Slalom Kitzbuehel 13 January 1980, 4th Giant slalom Adelboden 21 January 1980, 5th - Giant slalom Morzine 6 January 1981, 4th Giant slalom Schladming 3 February 1981, 3rd Giant slalom Voss 11 February 1981. In the Italian Championships 1980/81, he was victorious in Slalom and finished second in giant slalom.

== Death ==
While taking the opportunity to visit the "Tongariro" National Park on a day off from training, he died in a car accident, along with coach Ilario Pegorari (a former alpine skier, born 9 January 1949), fitness coach Karl Pichler, and masseur Ivano Ruzza on 17 August 1982, in Ruapehu, New Zealand. The car of the Italians crashed into a car of a New Zealand family with five people inside. The driver of that family's car was very badly injured. Another Italian skier, Carlo Gerosa (born on 30 November 1964), escaped with minor injuries. Ivano Ruzza was taken to a hospital, where he died due to his severe injuries.
