= Dieter Fersch =

German alpine skier (born 1946)

Dieter Fersch (born 10 January 1946 in Bad Hindelang) is a German retired alpine skier who competed in the 1968 Winter Olympics, finishing 19th in the men's downhill.

== See also ==
- History of skiing
