= Miran Gašperšič =

Slovenian alpine skier (born 1948)

Personal information
- Nationality: Slovenian
- Born: 22 October 1948 (age 78) Jesenice, Yugoslavia

Sport
- Sport: Alpine skiing

Miran Gašperšič (born 22 October 1948) is a Slovenian alpine skier. He competed in two events at the 1976 Winter Olympics, representing Yugoslavia.
