= Beat von Allmen =

Swiss alpine skier (born 1941)

Personal information
- Nationality: Swiss
- Born: 26 October 1941 (age 85) Bern, Switzerland

Sport
- Sport: Alpine skiing

Beat von Allmen (born 26 October 1941) is a Swiss alpine skier. He competed in the men's giant slalom at the 1964 Winter Olympics.
