= Alain Blanchard =

French soldier (died 1419)

Alain Blanchard (died 1419) was a French soldier who fought in the Hundred Years' War. He participated in the defence of Rouen when it was besieged by English troops under Henry V of England from July 1418 to January 1419. After the city fell, Henry V demanded the French surrender Blanchard over to the English along with two other French notables for to having hanged English prisoners of war from Rouen's city walls. The French handed over Blanchard to the English, who executed him by beheading.

== Legacy ==
During the late 18th and 19th centuries, as a result of worsening Anglo-French relations due to the French Revolutionary and Napoleonic Wars and colonial disputes, several works about Blanchard were written in France. In 1793, French playwright Antoine Vieillard de Boismartin wrote a tragedy with Blanchard as the protagonist, and in 1826 another play about Blanchard was published by Alexandre Dupias. Blanchard was also the subject of a musical drama by Louis Boïeldieu and poems by Auguste Thorel de Saint-Martin and Émile Coquatrix and of a story written by P. Dumesnil in 1847.

== Bibliography ==
- Théodore Licquet, Dissertation sur Alain Blanchard, Rouen, Précis de l'Académie des sciences, belles-lettres et arts de Rouen|Académie de Rouen, 1828.
- Alexandre Dupias, Réfutation du discours contre Alain Blanchard prononcé par M. Th. Licquet, président de l'Académie royale des sciences, belles-lettres et arts de Rouen en la séance publique du 26 août 1828, Rouen, N. Périaux le jeune, 1828.
- Théodore-Éloi Lebreton, Biographie rouennaise, Rouen, Le Brument, 1865.
