= Michel Arpin =

French alpine skier (1935–2015)

Personal information
- Nationality: French
- Born: 28 December 1935; Sainte-Foy-Tarentaise, France
- Died: 30 May 2015 (aged 79)

Sport
- Sport: Alpine skiing

Michel Arpin (28 December 1935 – 30 May 2015) was a French alpine skier. He competed in the men's slalom at the 1964 Winter Olympics.
