= Marko Kavčič =

Slovenian alpine skier (born 1949)

Personal information
- Nationality: Slovenian
- Born: 8 July 1949 (age 75); Ljubljana, Slovenia

Sport
- Sport: Alpine skiing

Marko Kavčič (born 8 July 1949) is a Slovenian alpine skier. He competed in two events at the 1972 Winter Olympics, representing Yugoslavia.
