= Fric Detiček =

Slovenian alpine skier (born 1943)

Frederik "Fric" Detiček (born 27 January 1943, in Kranj) is a Slovenian former alpine skier who competed for Yugoslavia in the 1964 Winter Olympics. He participated in the Men's Downhill, Men's Giant Slalom, and Men's Slalom events.
