= Felice De Nicolò =

Italian alpine skier (1942–2023)

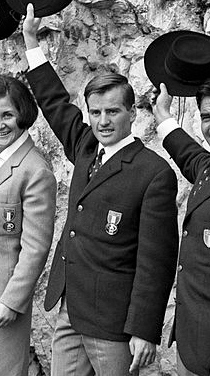
- De Nicolò after the 1966 World Championships

Personal information
- Born: 22 March 1942 Selva di Val Gardena, Italy
- Died: 4 October 2023 (aged 81)
- Height: 1.65 m (5 ft 5 in)
- Weight: 62 kg (137 lb)

Sport
- Sport: Alpine skiing

Felice De Nicolò (22 March 1942 – 4 October 2023) was an Italian alpine skier. He finished 25th in the downhill at the 1960 Winter Olympics and 28th in the giant slalom at the 1964 Winter Olympics. In 1964 he won the downhill and slalom events at the Three Cableways Cup. De Nicolò died on 4 October 2023, at the age of 81.
