= Stefan Kälin =

Swiss alpine skier (born 1942)

Stefan Kälin (born 29 September 1942 in Einsiedeln) is a Swiss former alpine skier. He finished 10th in the men's slalom at the 1964 Winter Olympics and finished 28th in the men's giant slalom at the 1968 Winter Olympics.
