= Jože Gazvoda =

Slovenian alpine skier (born 1949)

Jože Gazvoda (born 4 February 1949, in Ljubljana) is a Slovenian retired alpine skier who competed for Yugoslavia in the 1968 Winter Olympics.
