= Ernst Scherzer =

German alpine skier (born 1937)

Personal information
- Nationality: German
- Born: 5 October 1937 (age 87); Saxony, Germany

Sport
- Sport: Alpine skiing

Ernst Scherzer (born 5 October 1937) is a German alpine skier. He competed in the men's slalom at the 1964 Winter Olympics. He worked for the Stasi between 1977 and 1989.
