= Blaž Jakopič =

Slovenian alpine skier (born 1945)

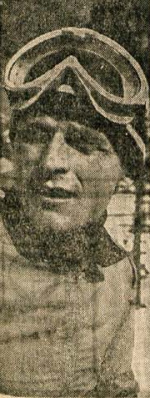
Blaž Jakopič Portrait

Blaž Jakopič (born 1 November 1945 in Bled) is a Slovenian former alpine skier who competed for Yugoslavia in the 1968 Winter Olympics.
