= Georges Mauduit =

French alpine skier (born 1940)

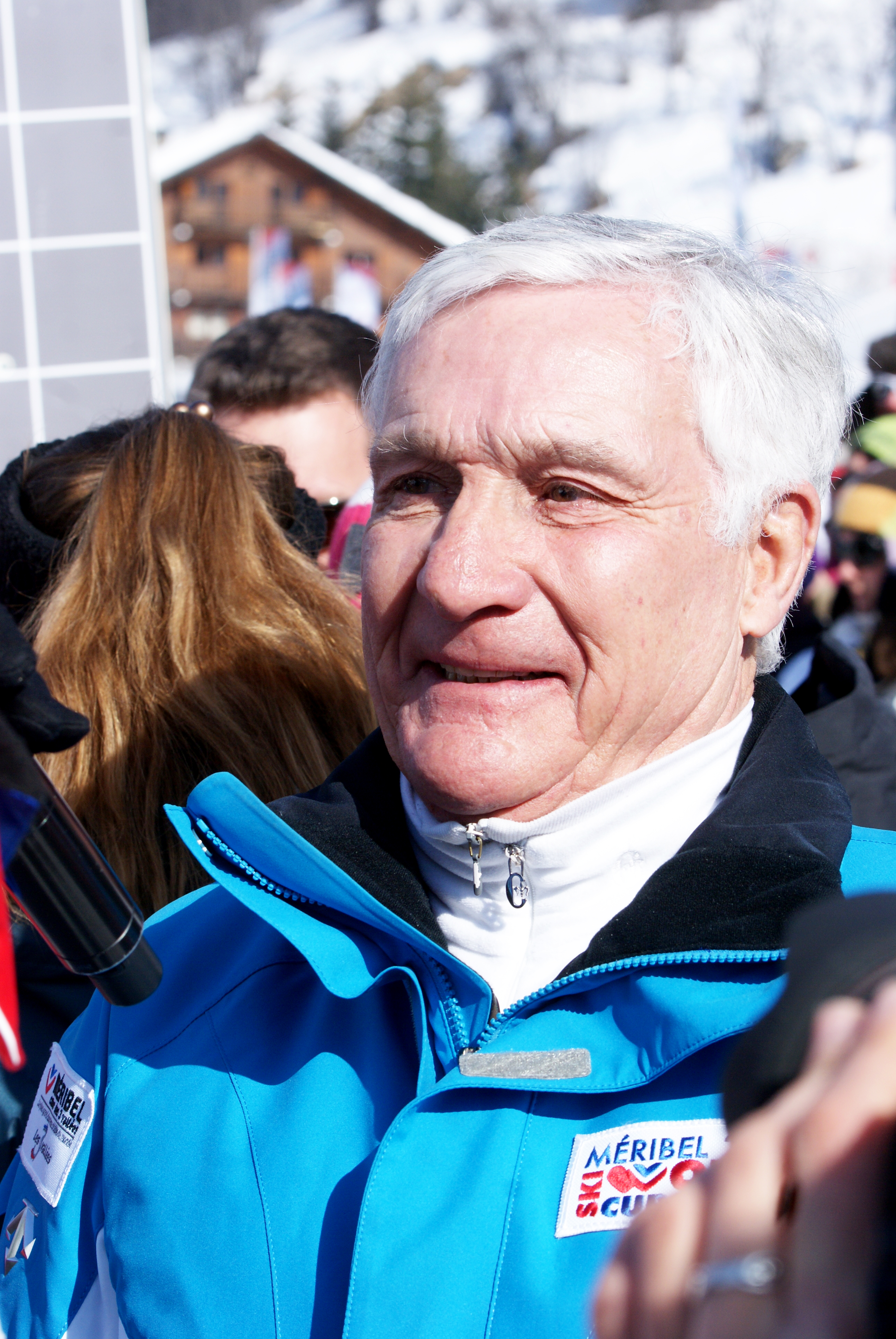

Personal information
- Born: 3 December 1940 (age 85) Chambéry, France

Skiing career
- Sport: Alpine skiing
- Retired: 1970
- Disciplines: Technical events
- World Cup debut: 1966

Olympics
- Teams: 1

World Championships
- Teams: 2
- Medals: 1

World Cup
- Seasons: 5
- Wins: 1
- Podiums: 8
Medal record
Men's alpine skiing
Representing France
World Cup race podiums
Event	1st	2nd	3rd
Slalom	0	2	0
Giant slalom	1	3	2
Total	1	5	2
World Championships
Bronze medal – third place	1966 Portillo	Giant slalom

Georges Mauduit (born 3 December 1940) is a French former alpine skier who competed in the 1968 Winter Olympics.
