= Oto Pustoslemšek =

Slovenian alpine skier (born 1943)

Oto Pustoslemšek (born 18 March 1943 in Mežica) is a Slovenian former alpine skier who competed for Yugoslavia in the 1964 Winter Olympics, finishing 62nd in the men's downhill and 67th in the men's giant slalom.
