= Peter Lakota =

Slovenian alpine skier (born 1937)

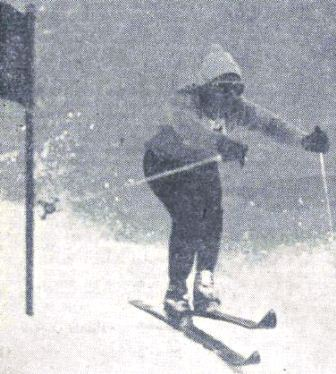
Peter Lakota

Peter Lakota (born 23 November 1937 in Javornik, Kranj) is a Slovenian former alpine skier who competed for Yugoslavia in the 1964 Winter Olympics.
