= Andrej Klinar =

Slovenian alpine skier (1942–2011)

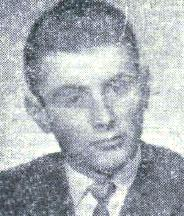
Andrej Klinar

Andrej Klinar (5 February 1942 in Jesenice – 5 April 2011 in Bled) was a Slovenian alpine skier who competed for Yugoslavia in the 1964 Winter Olympics and 1968 Winter Olympics.
