= Westenholz =

Westenholz is a surname. Notable people with the surname include:

- Anders Westenholz (1936–2010), Danish psychologist and writer
- Caroline de Westenholz (born 1954), British-Dutch historian
- Charles von Westenholz (1945–2006), British alpine skier
- Elisabeth Westenholz (born 1942), Danish classical pianist and organist
- Jane von Westenholz (born 1953), British courtier
- Joan Goodnick Westenholz (1943–2013), American archaeologist
- Piers von Westenholz (born 1943), British alpine skier
- Sophia Maria Westenholz (1759–1838), German classical composer, musician, singer and music educator
