= Charles von Westenholz =

British alpine skier (1945–2006)

Charles Patrick Paul, Freiherr von Westenholz (17 March 1945 – 9 March 2006) was a British alpine skier who competed in the 1964 Winter Olympics.

== Early life ==
Westenholz was born on 17 March 1945. He was a son of Henry Frederick Everhard Baron von Westenholz (1916–1984) and Marguerite Gordon Ness. His parents divorced in 1968 and his father married Flora Evelyn Innes (née Stuart) Langford-Holt (a daughter of Ian St Clair Stuart and former wife of Sir John Anthony Langford-Holt, MP for Shrewsbury) in 1969. His brother was the interior designed and fellow skier, Piers von Westenholz, whose second wife Jane is one of the official Queen's companions to Queen Camilla.

His paternal grandfather was Paul Eberhard, Baron von Westenholz.

== Career ==
At the time of his wedding, he was described as a banker and British Olympic skier. In 1987, he joined the board of Highgate and Job (which later merged with Mitie) on behalf of the Jivraj family. In 2000, Westenholz, a former director of Grindlay Brandts, was a member of the Jupiter International board of directors.

== Personal life ==
On 6 April 1970, he married Lady Mary Marianne Anne Kerr in London. Lady Mary is the eldest daughter of Peter Kerr, 12th Marquess of Lothian and Antonella Reuss Newland (the only child of Maj.-Gen. Sir Foster Reuss Newland). Together, they were the parents of three sons:

- Alexander Peter Frederick, Baron von Westenholz (b. 1971)
- Baron Mark Henry Cosimo von Westenholz (b. 1973)
- Baron Nicholas Anthony Philip von Westenholz (b. 1975)

Westenholz, who lived at Little Blakesware, Hertfordshire, died at age 60 in a skiing accident on 9 March 2006.
