= 2025 state visit by Donald Trump to the United Kingdom =

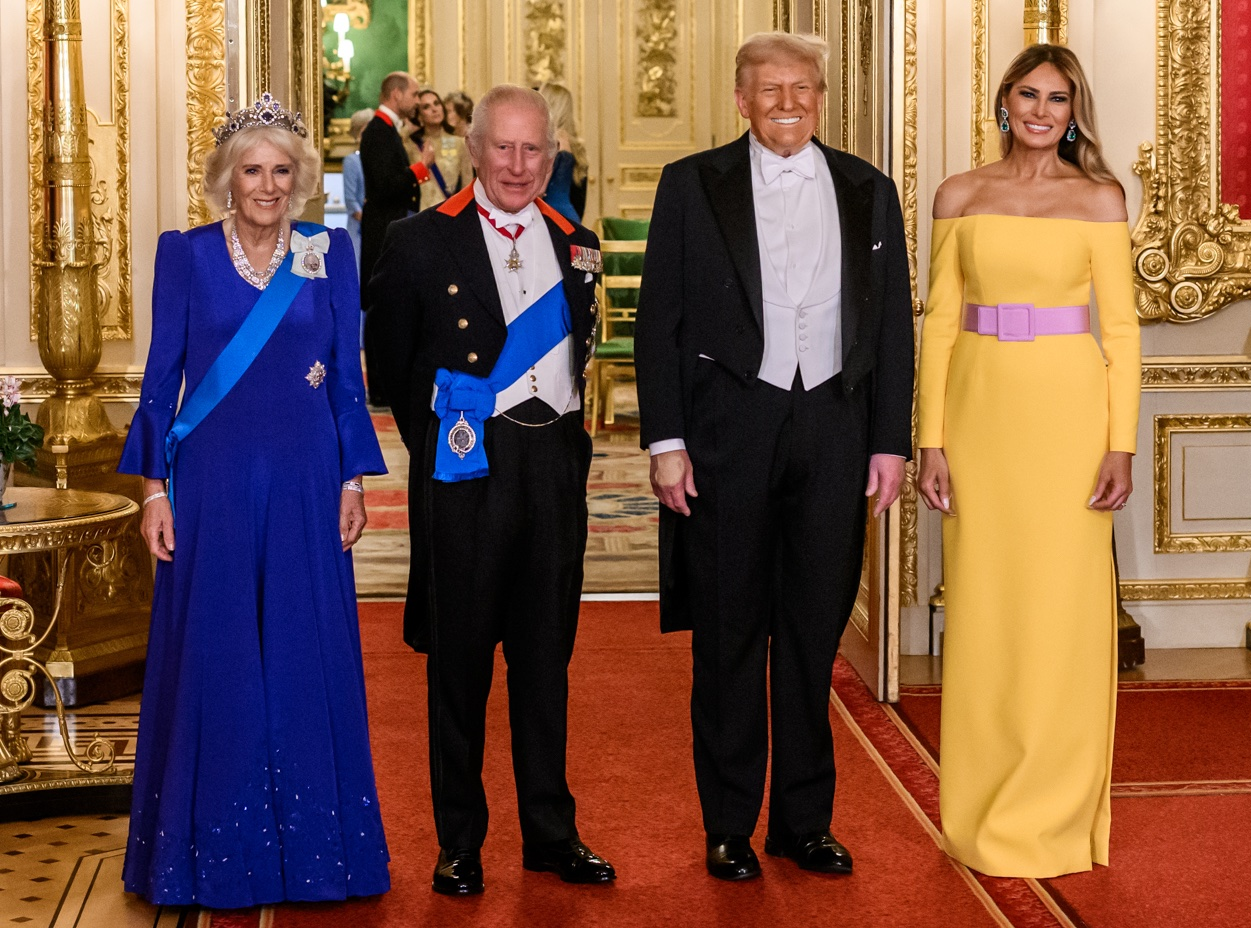
- Date: 16 to 18 September 2025
- Time: Arrival: 8:39pm BST (UTC+01:00); Departure: 5:54pm BST (UTC+01:00)
- Location: London Windsor Chequers
- Type: State visit
- Participants: President Donald Trump; First Lady Melania Trump

From 16 to 18 September 2025, the president of the United States, Donald Trump, made a state visit to the United Kingdom with his wife, the first lady of the United States, Melania Trump. He was received by King Charles III and stayed at Windsor Castle, and later met Prime Minister Keir Starmer at Chequers where they held a joint news conference to discuss a range of topics, including foreign affairs, trade, and immigration. The Trumps had previously met the King (then-Prince of Wales) and Queen Camilla (then-Duchess of Cornwall) at Clarence House during the NATO summit in London in December 2019.

This was Trump's second state visit to the United Kingdom, which occurred during his second presidency, the first occurring in June 2019 when he was received by Queen Elizabeth II during his first presidency.

Observers noted that Starmer used the state visit to build a warm personal relationship with Trump, with both leaders praising the "special relationship" between the two nations. This was seen by some as a diplomatic strategy to curry favour with Washington and avoid potential diplomatic penalties over policy disagreements.

The state visit was met with protests, mostly involving Trump's association with the sex offender Jeffrey Epstein, and the timing coincided with the sacking of former UK ambassador to the US, Peter Mandelson, over his own association with Epstein. The UK curated Trump's visit to avoid any potentially embarrassing protests.

== Background ==
UK prime minister Keir Starmer and US president Donald Trump held their first Oval Office meeting on 27 February 2025. The meeting marked Starmer's first visit to the White House and took place after Trump's return to office following the 2024 presidential election. Starmer hand-delivered a letter from King Charles III inviting Trump for a second state visit to the UK. Trump accepted the invitation. Before this meeting, no world leader had more than one official state visit to the UK; US presidents are typically invited for tea with the British monarch if they visit the UK for a second time while in office. Trump's predecessors George W. Bush and Barack Obama only made a state visit in 2003 and 2011, respectively, but during the end of their second terms they had tea with Queen Elizabeth II at Windsor Castle in 2008 and 2016. It was later announced that the visit would take place from 17 to 19 September 2025.

The state visit took place amid controversy surrounding Trump's social and professional relationship with sex offender Jeffrey Epstein, as well as Peter Mandelson's sacking as British ambassador to the US due to his own ties to Epstein. This created a diplomatic predicament for Trump, and his team were reportedly concerned about the timing, as Mandelson's dismissal over his links to Epstein could have shone an unwelcome spotlight on Trump's own past association with him. A source with knowledge of the White House's discussions said that Trump's team was "nervy" about anything that could resurface the Epstein scandal, and they were concerned Mandelson's dismissal would overshadow the UK state visit. The Guardian noted that with Trump having his own well-documented links to Epstein, "there is no subject he wants to revisit less" than the scandal surrounding Mandelson's ties to him. For Trump, whose priority was to avoid distractions during the state visit, the controversy arrived at an "especially awkward" time. The UK curated Trump's visit to avoid any potentially embarrassing protests.

Before departing for the UK, Trump told reporters outside the White House that Charles and Camilla were "longtime friends" and praised Charles as "an elegant gentleman".

== Schedule ==
=== 16 September ===
On arrival at Stansted Airport, Trump and First Lady Melania Trump were received by Warren Stephens, the United States ambassador to the Court of St James's and British foreign secretary Yvette Cooper. They were formally welcomed on behalf of King Charles III by the lord-in-waiting, Henry Hood, 8th Viscount Hood. The President and First Lady flew in Marine One to Winfield House, the official London residence of the U.S. ambassador, located in Regent's Park, where they stayed overnight.

=== 17 September ===
The Trumps, having arrived in Marine One, were greeted by William, Prince of Wales, and Catherine, Princess of Wales, at Windsor Castle before being formally welcomed by King Charles III and Queen Camilla. A royal salute was fired by Windsor Castle and the Tower of London to mark the occasion. The President and First Lady then joined members of the British royal family for lunch at Windsor Castle, after which they were shown a special exhibition in the Green Drawing Room featuring items from the Royal Collection relating to the United States. During the exchange of gifts, the King was presented with the replica of a sword kept in the collection of the Dwight D. Eisenhower Presidential Library while the Queen received a Tiffany & Co. vintage 18-carat gold, diamond and ruby flower brooch. The director of the library later resigned from his position after refusing to remove the original sword from the collection to be given to the King and he was allegedly told "Resign - or be fired".

President Trump and Melania Trump later laid a wreath on the tomb of the late Queen Elizabeth II at St George's Chapel, with President Trump describing the visit to the Chapel as a "great honor." The presidential couple, accompanied by the King and Queen, viewed a special Beating Retreat military ceremony performed by British and American musicians at Windsor Castle's East Lawn, marking the first time this kind of ceremony was performed at a state visit.

On Wednesday evening, a traditional state banquet was held in St George's Hall at the castle, during which both the King and president delivered speeches, with Trump and Charles III each hailing the US–UK Special Relationship. The banquet was attended by 160 guests, including Trump's daughter Tiffany Trump, members of the Royal Households including Carlyn Chisholm, Baroness Chisholm of Owlpen and Jane von Westenholz, technology titans such as Apple CEO Tim Cook, OpenAI's Sam Altman, Microsoft's Satya Nadella, and Nvidia's Jensen Huang, media mogul Rupert Murdoch, U.S. diplomats Marco Rubio, Scott Bessent, and Steve Witkoff, and UK Conservative Party opposition leader Kemi Badenoch.

=== 18 September ===
The president and first lady formally bid farewell to the King and Queen on Thursday morning. Trump then travelled to meet the prime minister of the United Kingdom, Keir Starmer, and his wife Victoria Starmer, at Chequers, the country house of the prime minister in Buckinghamshire. The president and the prime minister viewed the Winston Churchill archives at Chequers before their meeting and a joint news conference. The first lady joined Queen Camilla on a tour of Queen Mary's Dolls' House and the Royal Library at Windsor Castle, before attending a scouting event at Frogmore Gardens with the Princess of Wales. The princess is the joint president of The Scout Association, and with the US first lady, would host the Scouts and share miniature books and leaf printing. The first lady then traveled to Chequers to join her husband before their departure to the United States.

==== Press conference ====
During their meeting, Trump pledged American investments in the UK worth £150 billion and during their press conference, dubbed the "Tech Prosperity Deal". Trump said the US and UK had an "unbreakable bond", "priceless ties" and were "closer than ever".

Starmer said that he and Trump had discussed a resolution of the Gaza war: "we are working together to end the humanitarian catastrophe in the Middle East". Starmer intended to recognise a Palestinian state after Trump's visit, which Trump did not agree with and called "one of our few disagreements".

==== Trump departure ====
After departing Chequers, Trump headed for Air Force One. The flight taxied from London Stansted Airport at 5:50 pm and departed at 5:54 BST, marking the end of the visit.

== Opposition and protests ==
=== Parliament and Government ===
Several days after the state visit was announced, Conservative Party Member of Parliament and Shadow Minister for Home Affairs Alicia Kearns demanded Prime Minister Starmer cancel the state visit unless the US confirmed its loyalty to its allies. Following the Trump–Zelenskyy Oval Office meeting, Scottish First Minister John Swinney called for Trump's state visit to be cancelled if the U.S. ended support for Ukraine.

The banquet at Windsor Castle was boycotted by Ed Davey, the Leader of the Liberal Democrats in protest at Trump's policies toward the Gaza Strip and the ongoing humanitarian crisis there. Davey said that Trump "has the power to stop the horrifying starvation and death in Gaza and get the hostages released" due to his influence over Israel, Qatar and the Gulf states. First Minister of Wales Eluned Morgan also declined her invitation to the banquet, with a statement from the Welsh Government stating that she believed it would be better to remain in Wales to support her colleagues following the death of Hefin David. The Deputy First Minister of Northern Ireland, Emma Little-Pengelly attended the banquet though the First Minister Michelle O'Neill declined the invitation to attend. The United Kingdom branch of Republicans Overseas however, hosted a reception at Windsor Guildhall.

=== Non-government ===
By March 2025, petitions calling for the cancellation of Donald Trump's state visit to the UK had reached 250,000 signatures. In an article Newsweek said that Trump had faced "international disapproval" after his rift with Zelenskyy in the Oval Office.

According to a YouGov poll released on 17 September, 45% of Britons thought it was wrong to invite Trump to come for a second state visit, compared to 30% who thought it was the right move.

The UK curated Trump's visit to avoid any potentially embarrassing protests.

==== Jeffrey Epstein scandal ====
Members of the UK collective Everyone Hates Elon installed a 400-square-metre print of a widely circulated photograph of Trump and Epstein on the lawns of Windsor Castle on 15 September 2025. Journalists were detained for questioning on 17 September after police confiscated an advertising van associated with the group People vs Elon that was displaying images of Trump and Epstein on the streets of Windsor.

===== Peter Mandelson's dismissal =====
Earlier in September, a major scandal occurred in the UK surrounding former British Ambassador to the US Peter Mandelson's relationship with Epstein, which led to Starmer dismissing him from his diplomatic post. During an 18 September 2025 press conference in the UK, Trump claimed he did not know who Mandelson was, despite having met him multiple times. Trump made the statement when asked by Beth Rigby if he had any sympathy for Mandelson after he was dismissed from his role as ambassador. In response, Trump stated: "I don't know him, actually." He added that it was a choice made by the Prime Minister and suggested Starmer was better placed to speak on the matter.

Despite Trump's claim of not knowing Mandelson, multiple sources and photographic evidence show they have met on several occasions. In May 2025, Mandelson stood with Trump in the Oval Office during the announcement of a US-UK trade framework. Photos captured the two shaking hands and smiling together. According to Mandelson, Trump commented on his "beautiful accent" during one Oval Office meeting. Mandelson also received a signed note from Trump that read, "Peter, great job!".

===== Windsor Castle projections =====
On 16 September, members of the Led By Donkeys protest group, which had also targeted Trump during his last visit to the UK, projected a nine-minute video discussing Trump and Epstein's relationship from a hotel room opposite Windsor. The video also included a photograph and video clip of Virginia Giuffre, a widely circulated photograph of Prince Andrew, Duke of York with Epstein, and photographs of Epstein's accomplice Ghislaine Maxwell. Officers reportedly investigated the projection to "swiftly" stop it. Four individuals were arrested the following day, which according to an official statement by Thames Valley Police, was done on the grounds of malicious communications and an "unauthorised projection". They included a 60-year-old from East Sussex, a 36-year-old and a 50-year-old from London, and a 37-year-old from Kent. All four were released on conditional bail until 12 December. The investigation concluded, with no further action taken, on 22 October.

According to Led By Donkeys, it was the first time anyone from the group had been arrested for a projection. Led by Donkeys later told The Guardian that the arrests were "Orwellian" and "ridiculous". They mentioned that they had made between 25 and 30 projections prior to these arrests. They stated in their interview: "We projected a piece of journalism on to a wall and now people have been arrested for malicious communications. I think that, frankly, says a lot more about the policing of Trump's visit than it does about what we did." The morning of 17 September, a van parked outside Windsor Castle displayed an image of Trump and Epstein alongside the text: "Welcome to the UK, Donald."

==== Trump Not Welcome demonstration ====
A "Trump Not Welcome" demonstration was held in London on 17 September by the Stop Trump Coalition. The coalition has accused Trump of "denying climate science" and "siding with war criminals – in Israel, Russia and beyond" and asked the British government to cancel the state visit.

== Gallery ==
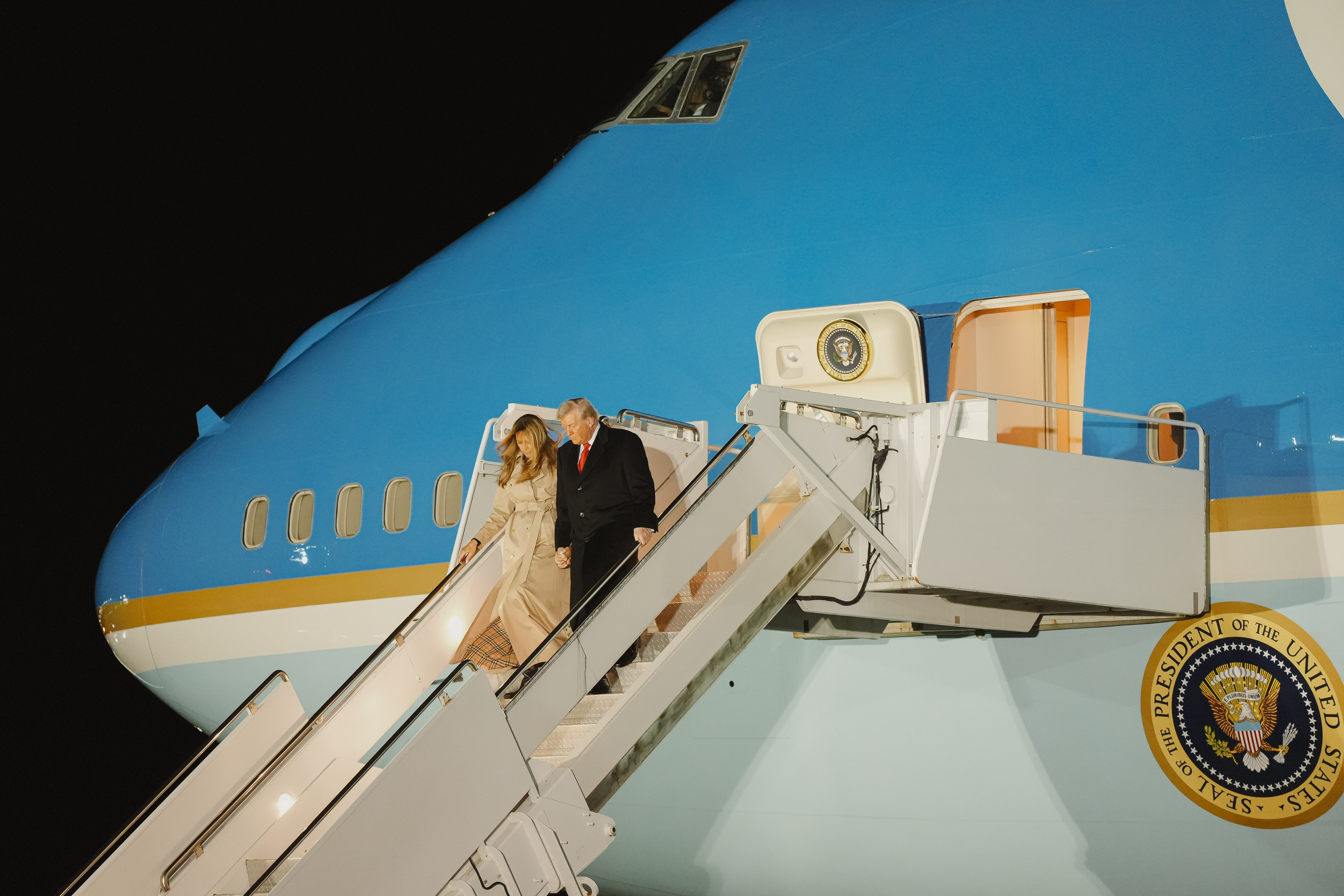
President Trump and First Lady Melania Trump arriving at Stansted Airport

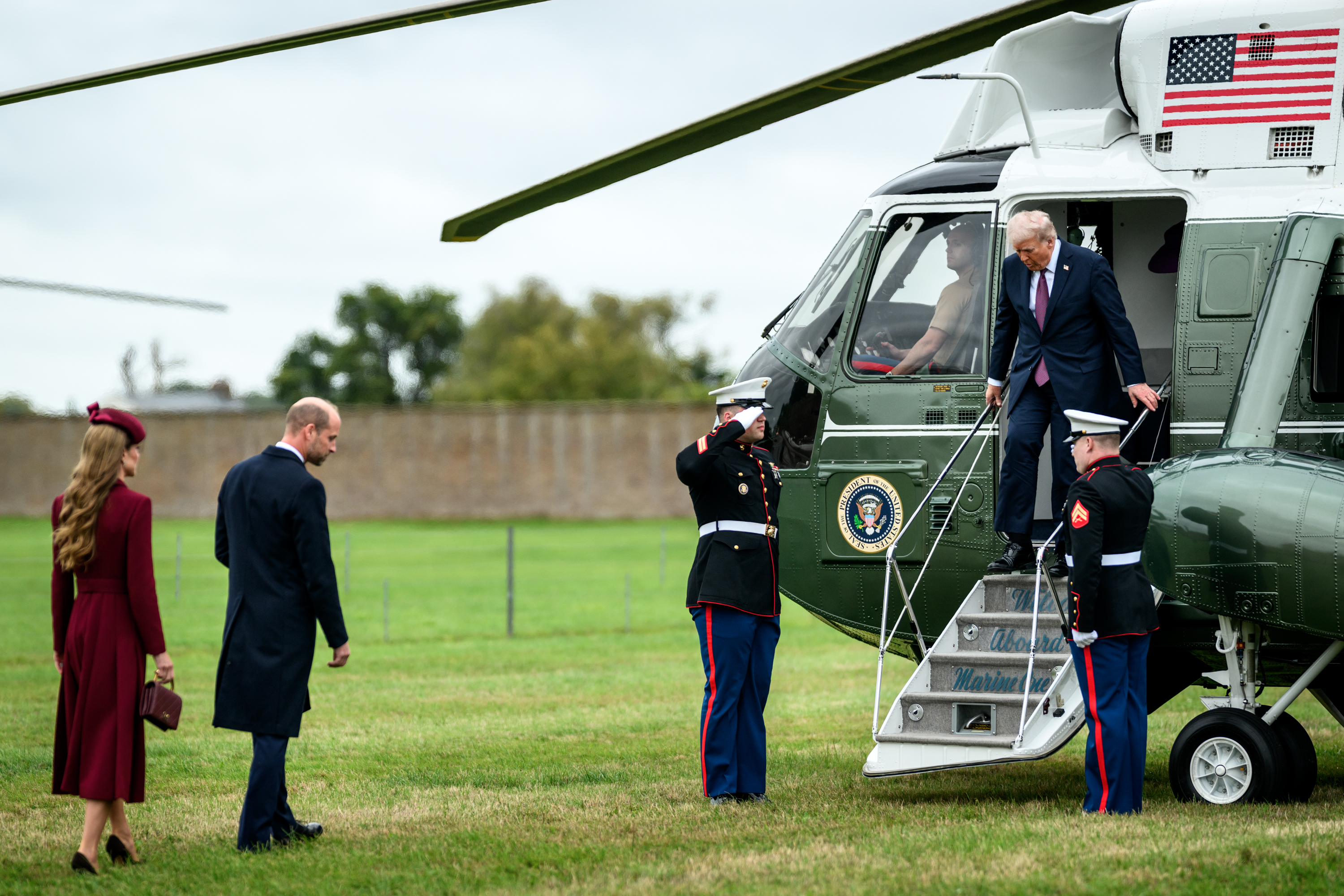
The Prince and Princess of Wales approach to greet the President as he gets off a Marine One helicopter at Windsor Castle.

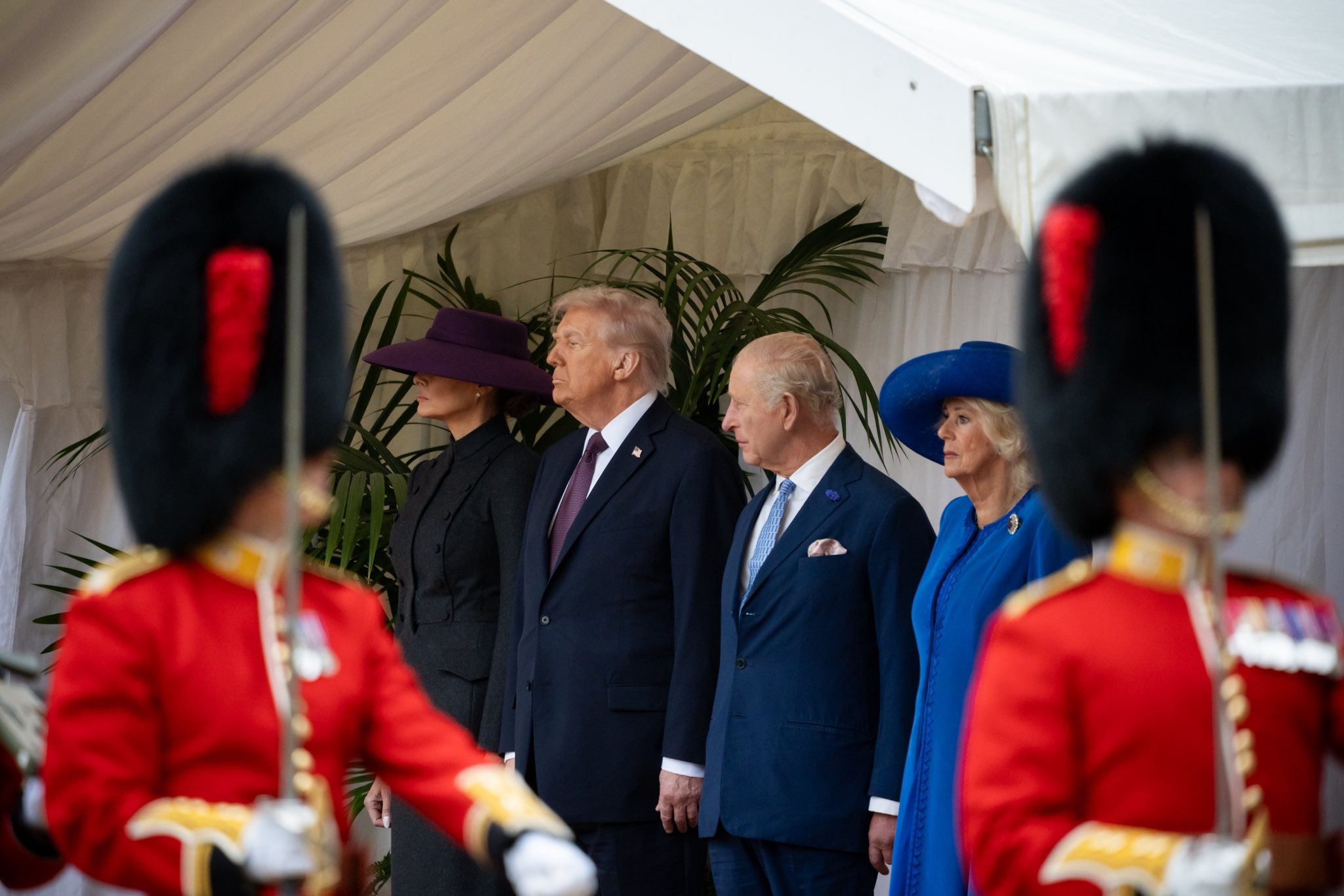
President Trump and First Lady Melania Trump with King Charles III and Queen Camilla at Windsor Castle, listening to the U.S. national anthem being played by the band of the Grenadier Guards

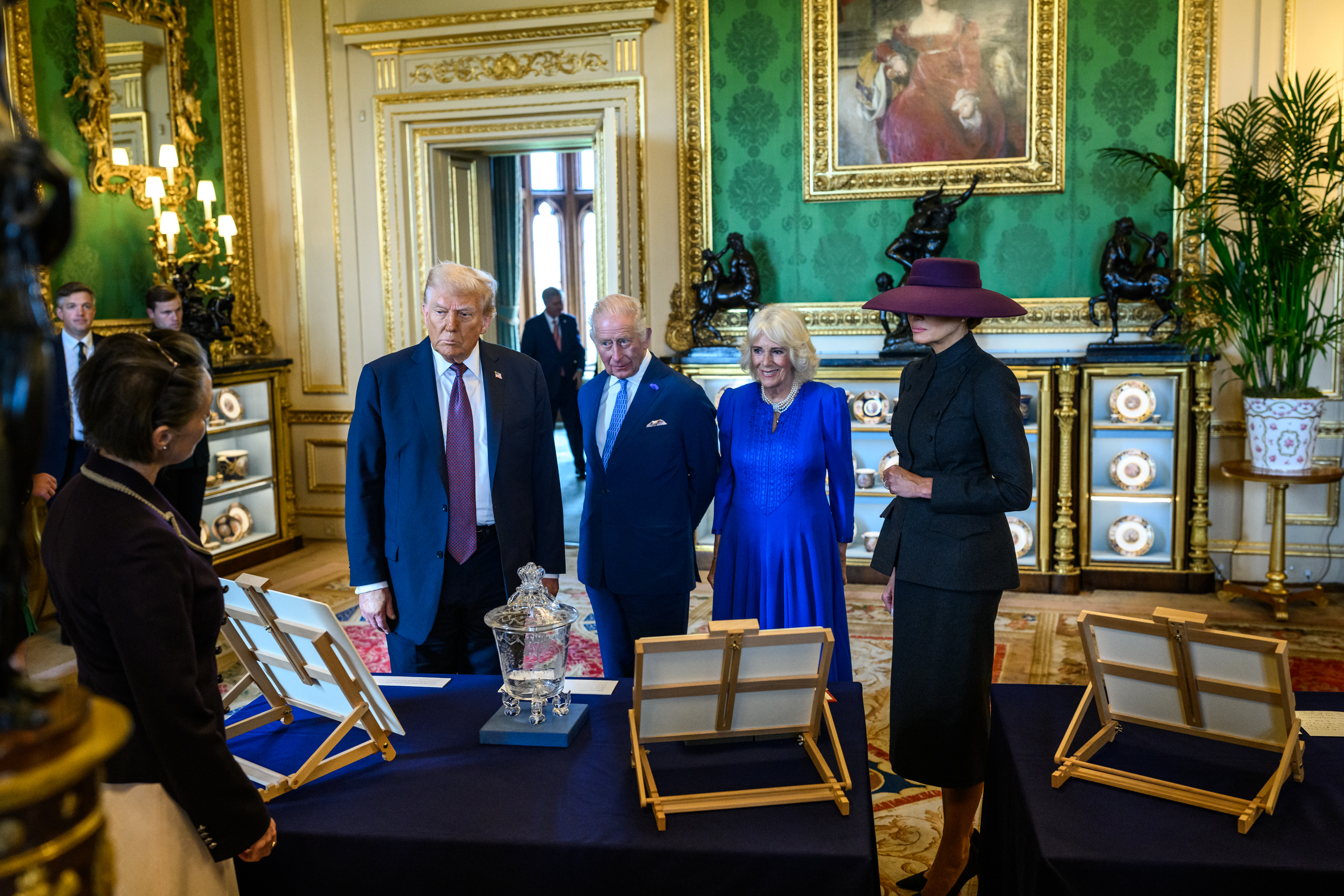
The President and the First Lady viewing items of significance to the U.S. from the Royal Collection alongside the King and Queen

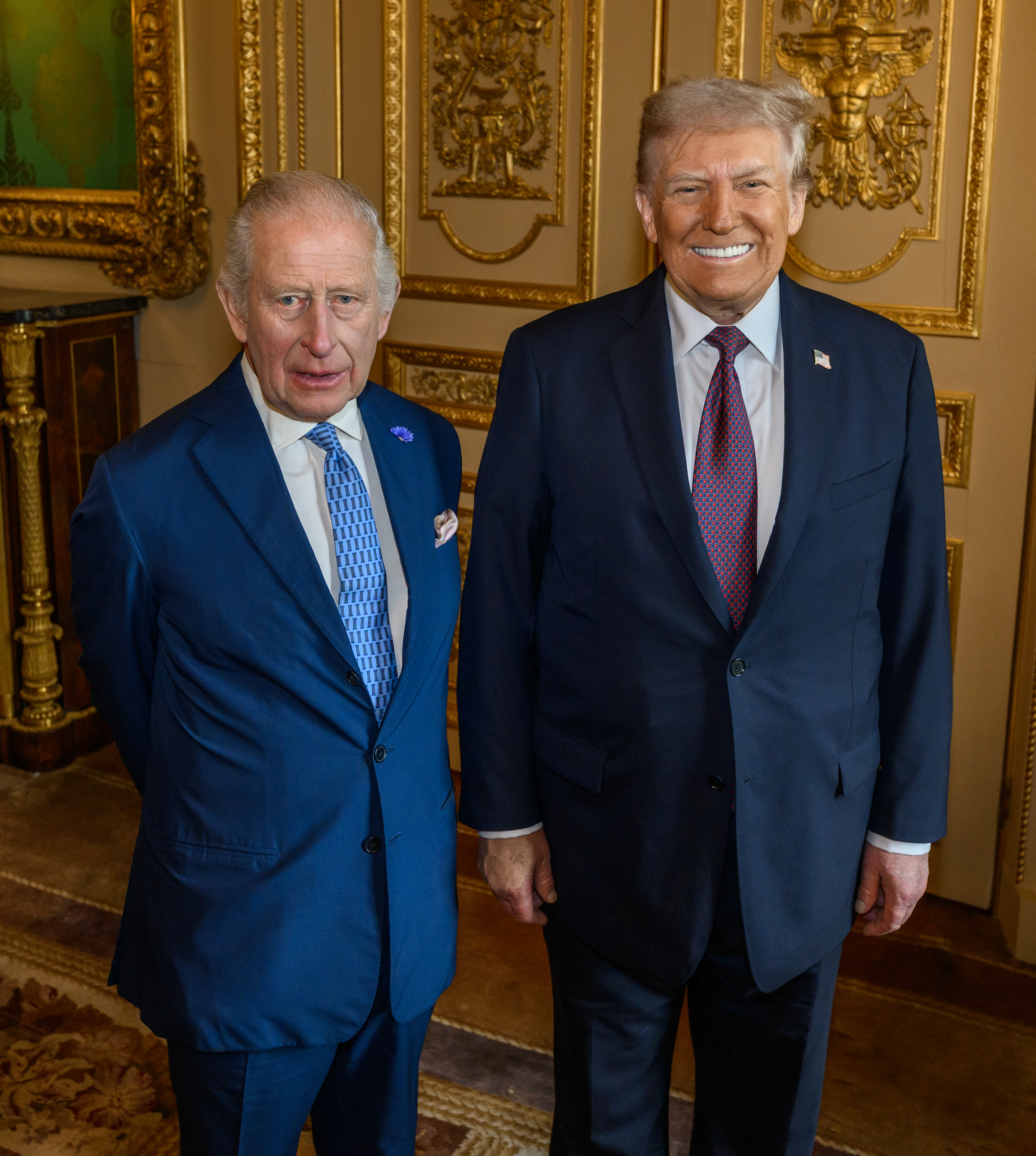
The President with the King at Windsor Castle

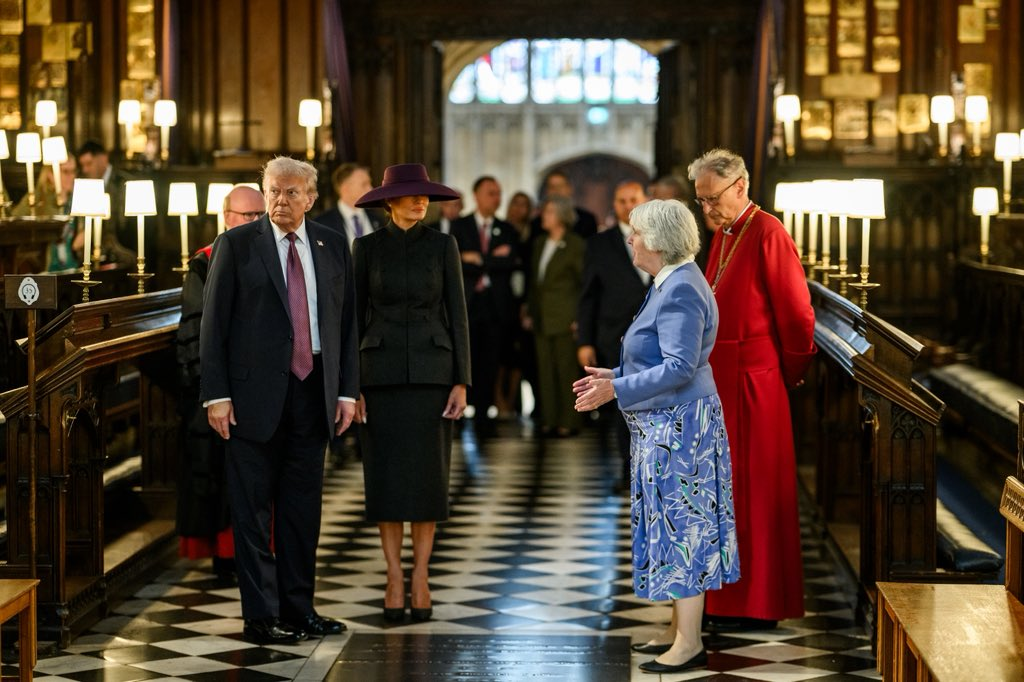
The President and the First Lady touring St George's Chapel before being taken to Queen Elizabeth II's tomb at King George VI Memorial Chapel

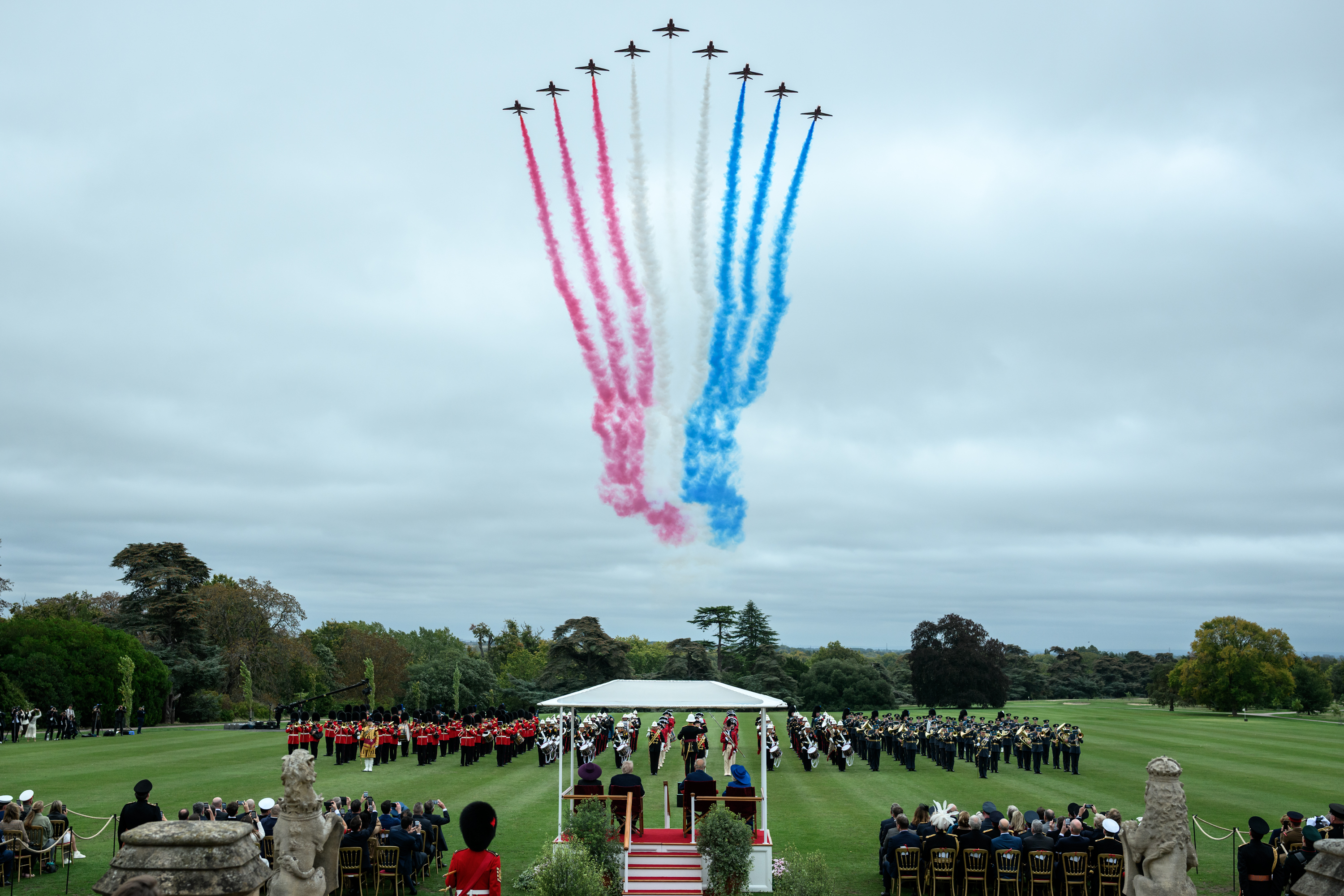
The President and the First Lady watch a military parade with the King and Queen at Windsor Castle.

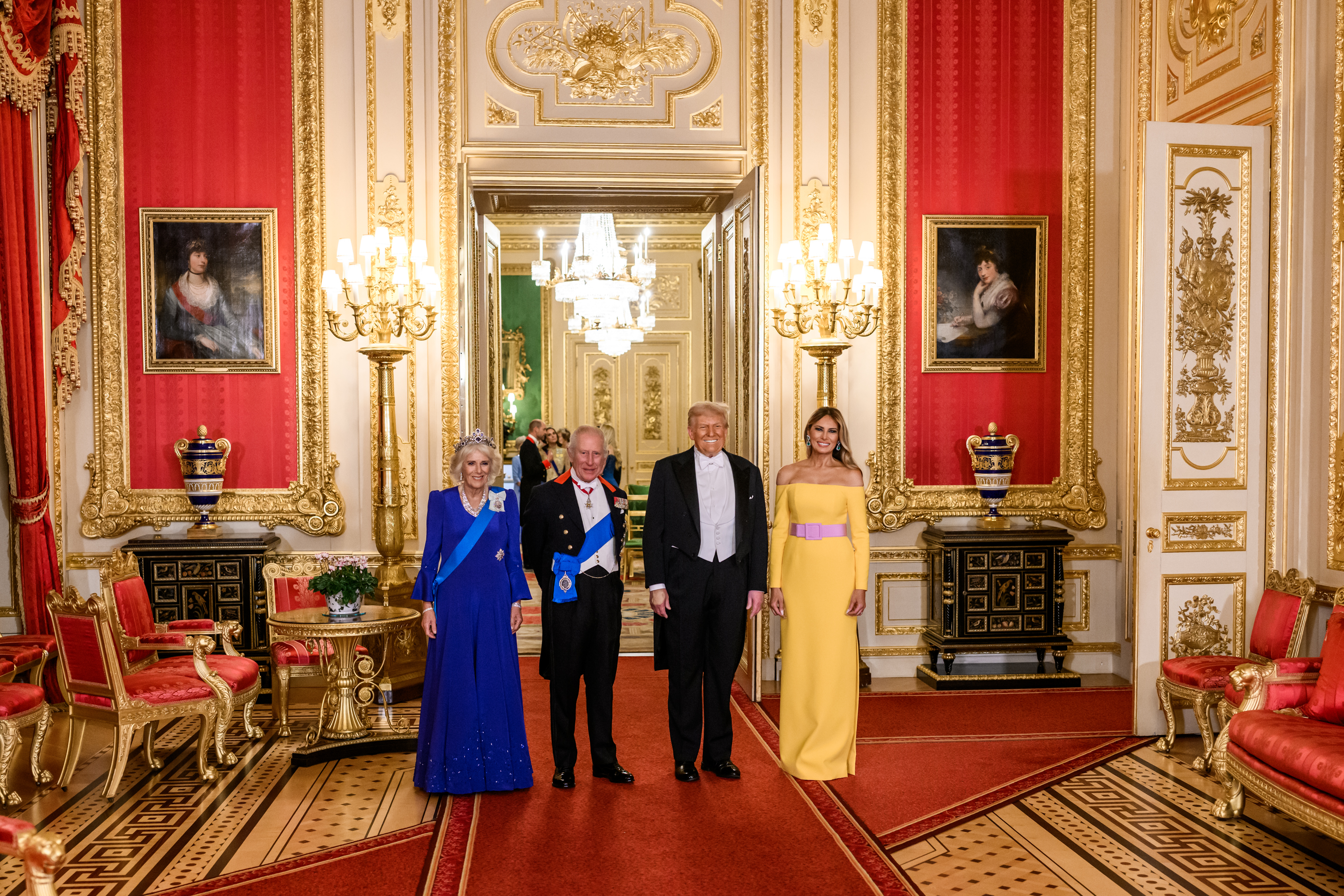
From left to right: The Queen, the King, the President and the First Lady pose for a photograph ahead of the state banquet at Windsor Castle.

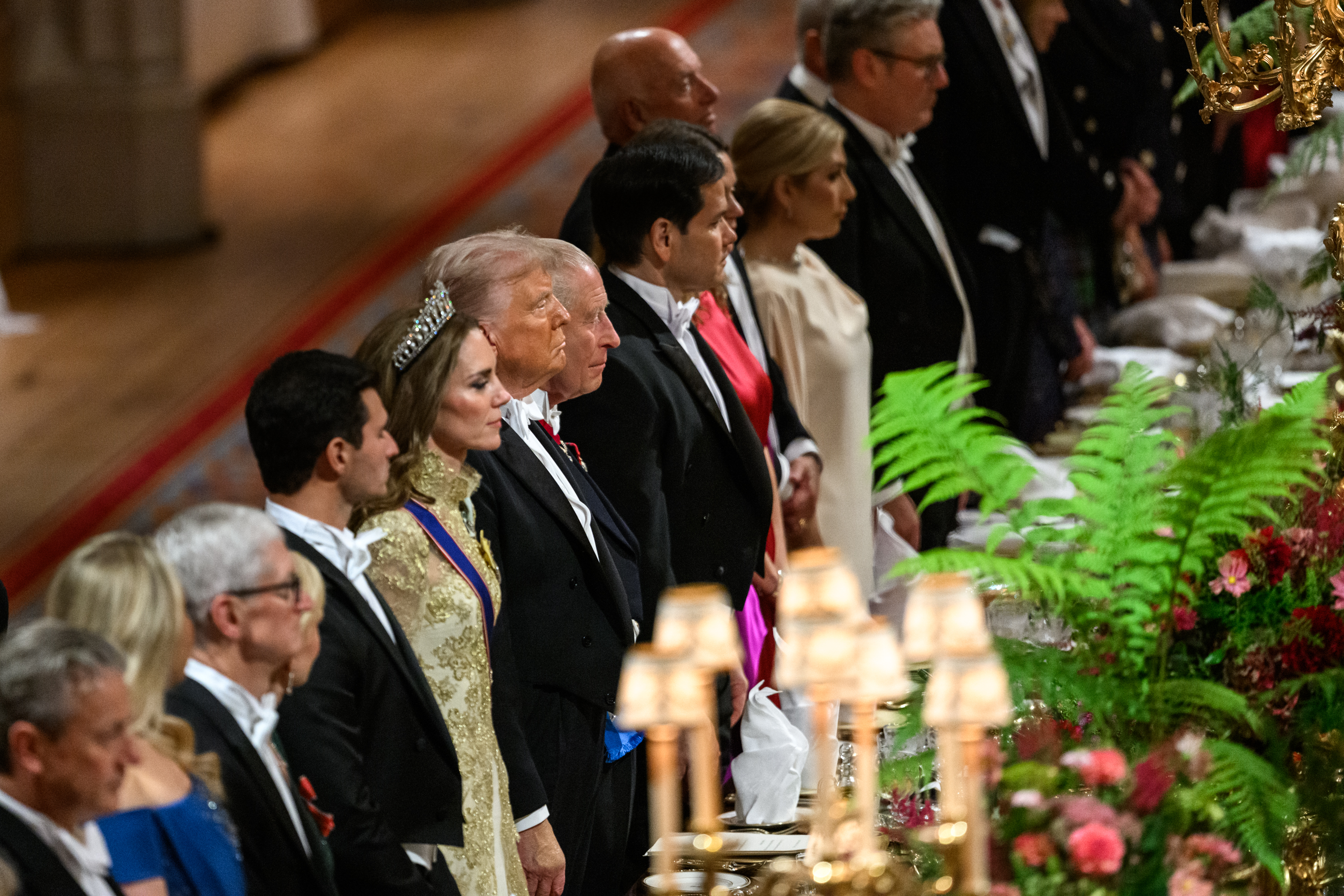
President Trump standing between the King and the Princess of Wales during the state banquet

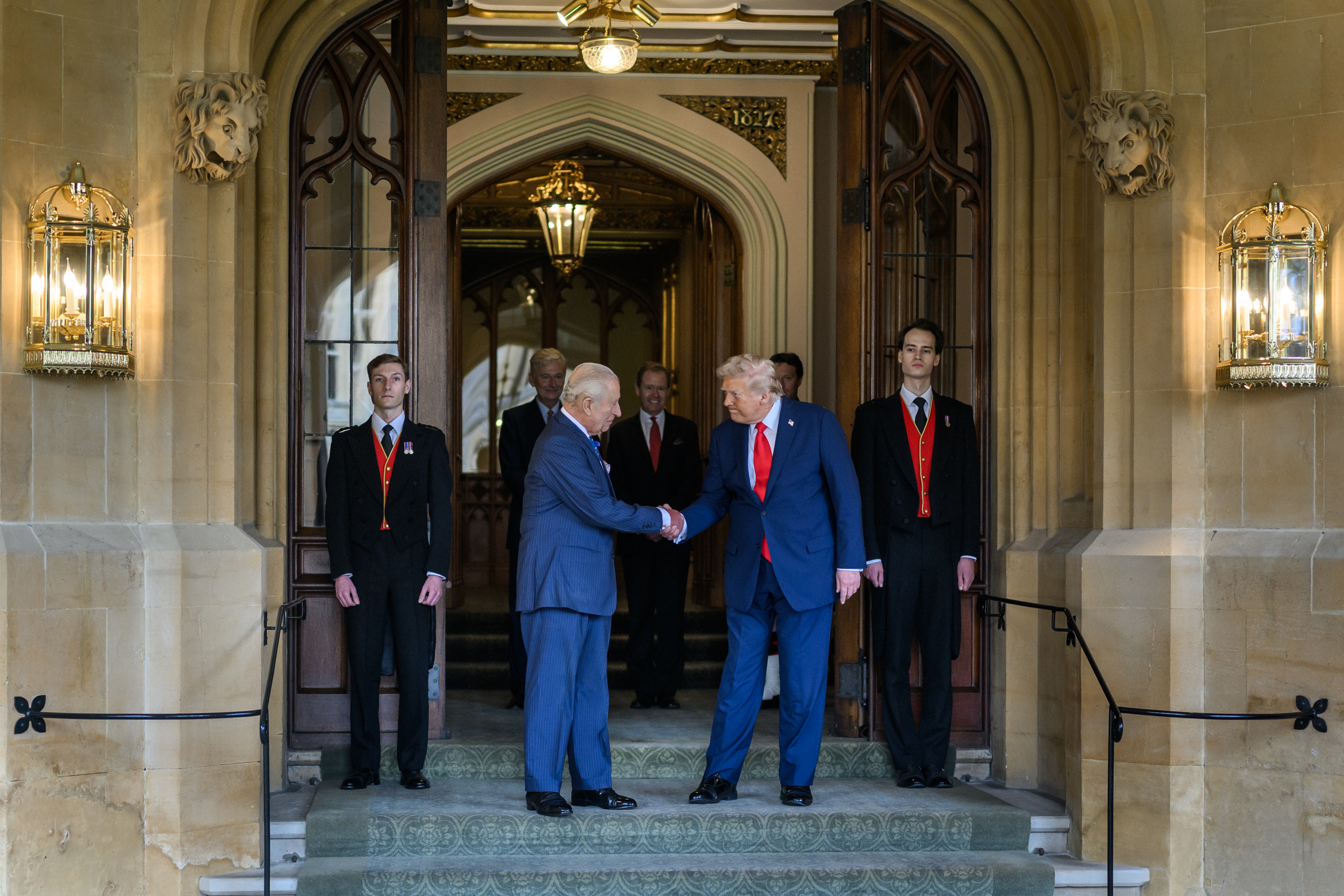
President Trump bid farewell to the King at Windsor Castle.

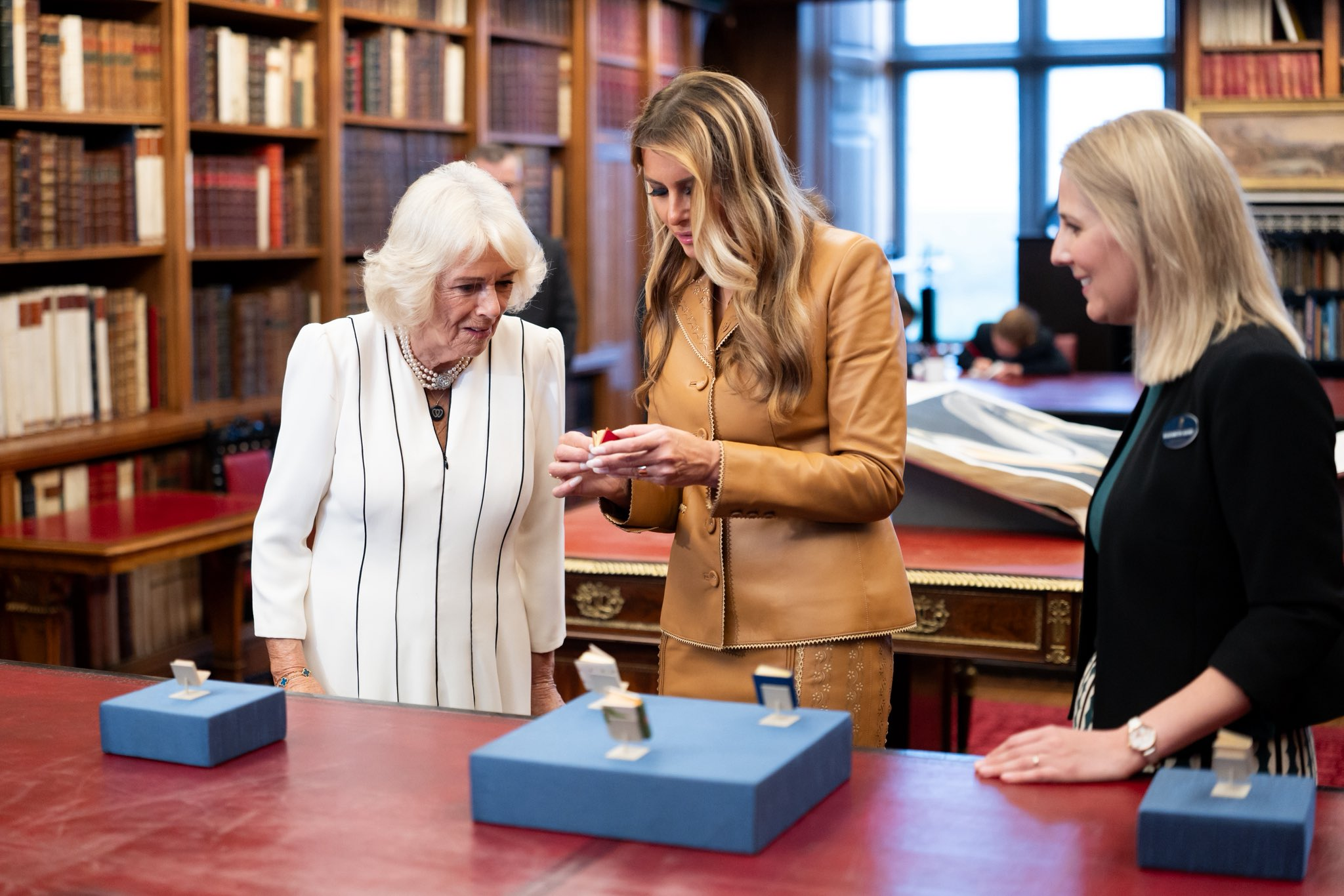
The Queen and the First Lady visited Queen Mary's Dolls' House and the Royal Library.

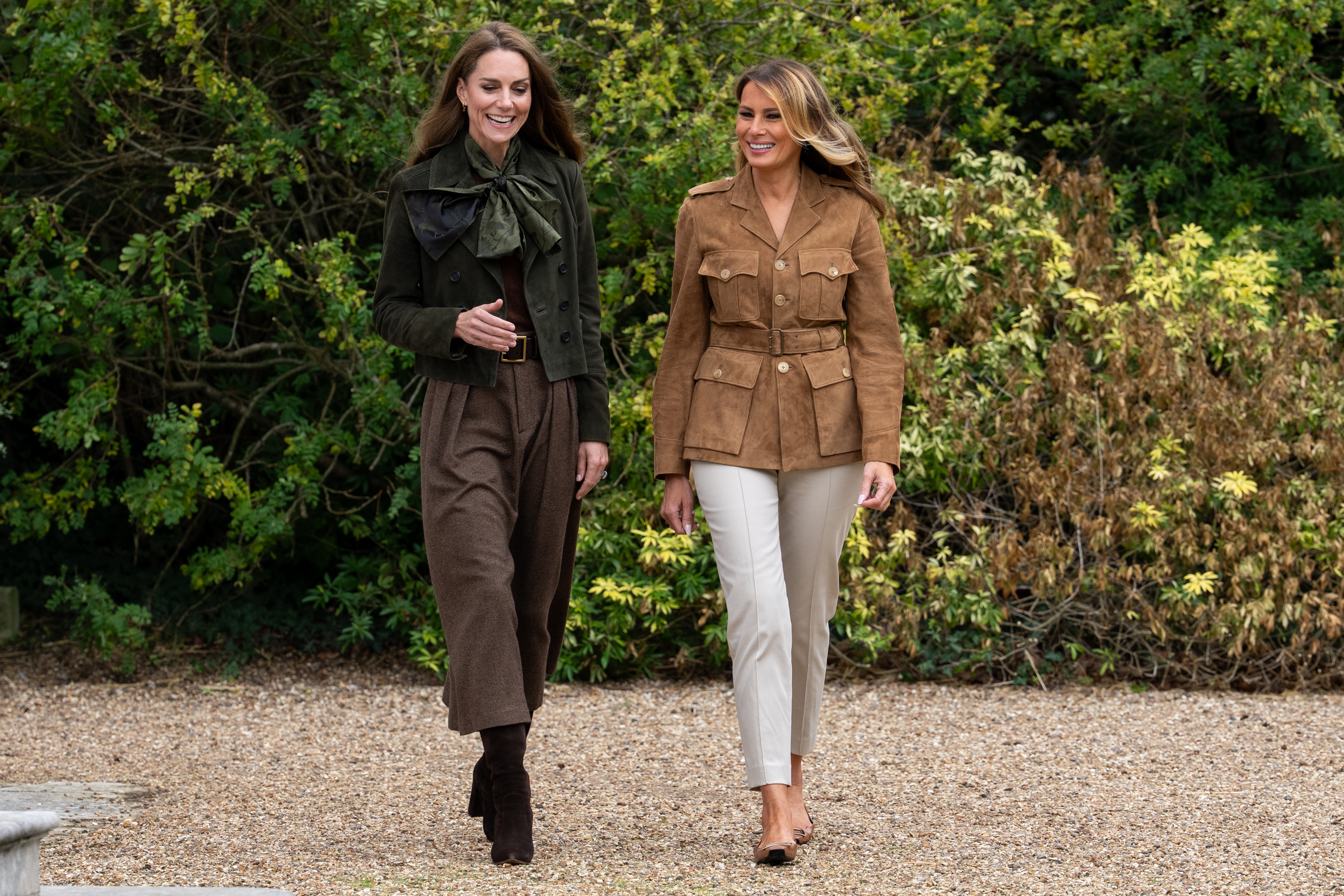
The First Lady and the Princess of Wales on their way to meet members of the Scouts' Squirrels programme at Frogmore Gardens

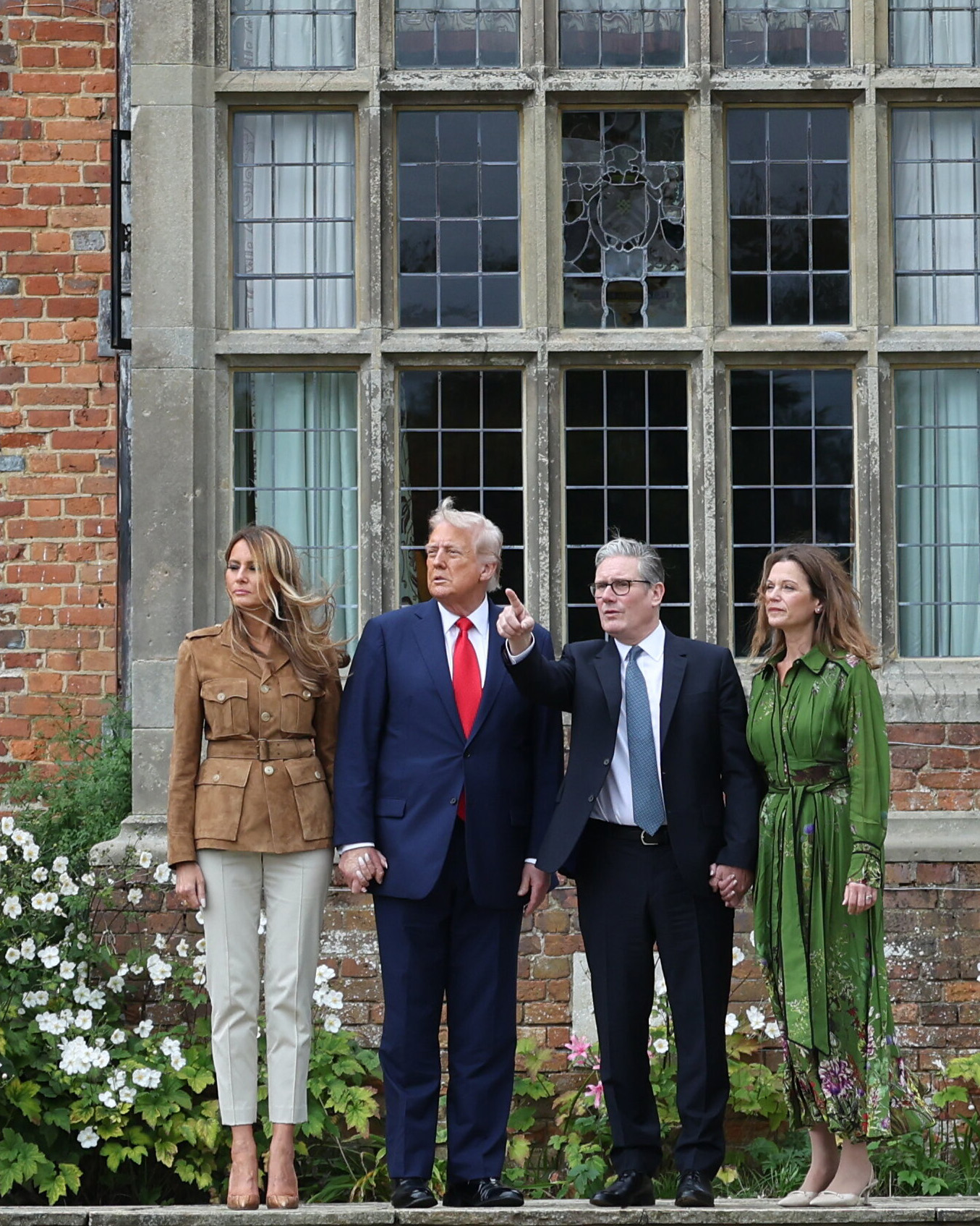
President Trump and First Lady Melania Trump with Prime Minister Keir Starmer and his wife Victoria Starmer at Chequers

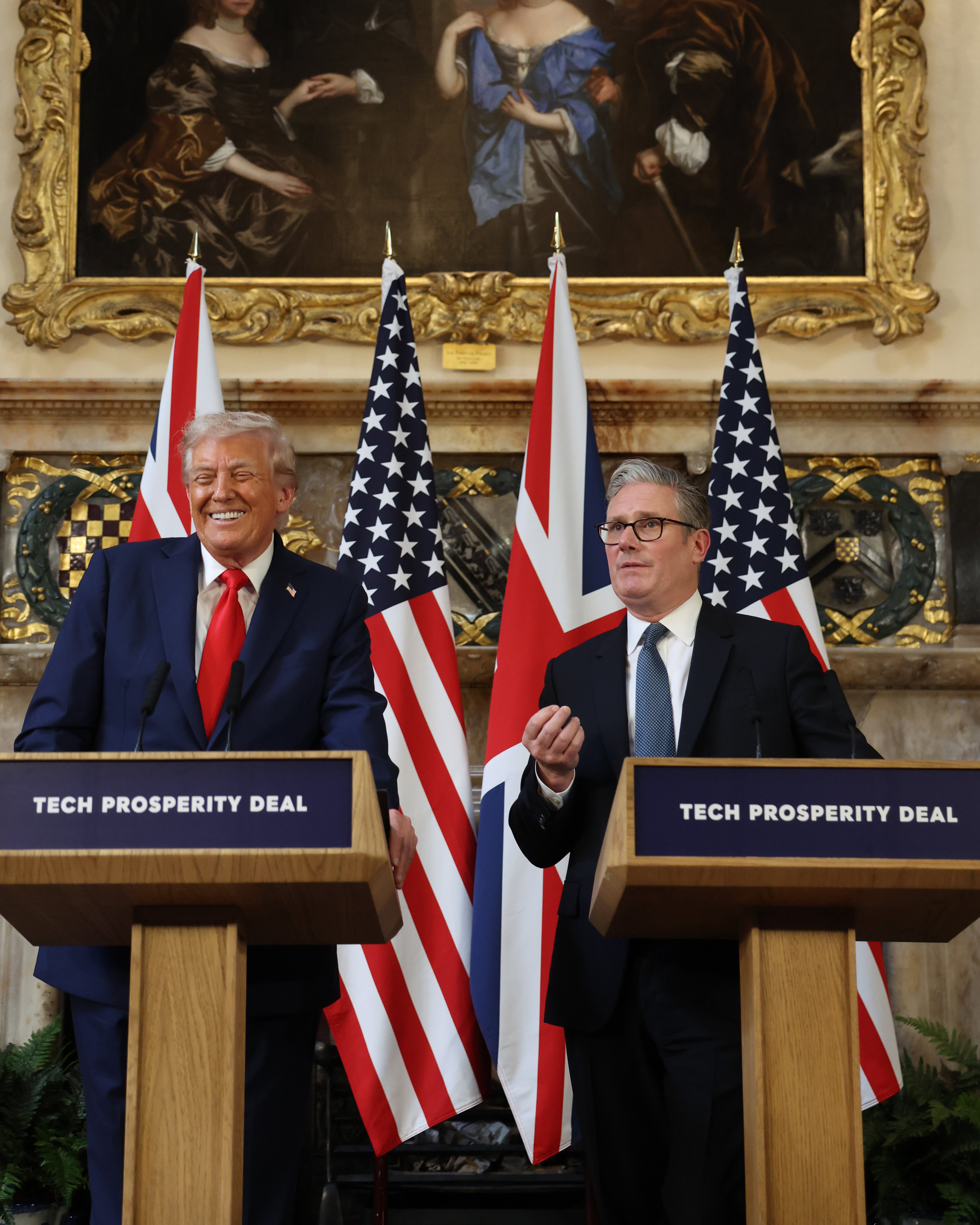
President Trump and Prime Minister Starmer holding a joint press conference in the afternoon of 18 September, prior to Trump's departure
