= Piers von Westenholz =

English alpine skier

Personal information
- Full name: Frederick Patrick Piers Freiherr von Westenholz
- Nationality: British
- Born: 10 December 1943 (age 82) Beaconsfield, England
- Spouses: Sarah von Hofmannsthal; Jane Leveson

Sport
- Sport: Alpine skiing
Medal record
Commonwealth Winter Games
Silver medal – second place	1962 St Moritz	Men's Team Downhill
Gold medal – first place	1962 St Moritz	Men's Team Slalom

Baron Frederick Patrick Piers von Westenholz (born 10 December 1943) is an interior designer and former English alpine skier. He competed in two events at the 1964 Winter Olympics.

== Early life ==
Piers was born on 10 December 1943 in Beaconsfield, England. He is the son and heir of Henry Frederick Everhard, Baron von Westenholz (1916–1984) and Marguerite Gordon Ness. His parents divorced in 1968 and his father married Flora Evelyn Innes (née Stuart) Langford-Holt (a daughter of Ian St Clair Stuart and former wife of Sir John Anthony Langford-Holt, MP for Shrewsbury) in 1969. His brother was the late banker and fellow skier, Charles, Freiherr von Westenholz (who married Lady Mary Kerr, daughter of Peter Kerr, 12th Marquess of Lothian).

His paternal grandfather was Paul Eberhard, Baron von Westenholz.

== Career ==
Westenholz "started his career working with the interior decorator David Mlinaric and went on to collaborate with other dealers, including both Christopher Gibbs and Robert Kime." He works from Hertfordshire "specialising in 18th- and 19th-century furniture and lighting, much of it on a grand scale."

Westenholz is one of House & Garden's Top 100 Interior Designers and a dealer in "18th- and 19th-century English and Anglo-Indian furniture and lighting."

== Personal life ==
He has been married twice. His first marriage was to Sarah Arabella Marjorie von Hofmannsthal, on 17 June 1964. Arabella is a daughter of Raimund von Hofmannsthal and Lady Elizabeth Hester Mary Paget (the second daughter of Charles Paget, 6th Marquess of Anglesey and Marjorie Paget, Marchioness of Anglesey, herself the eldest daughter of Henry Manners, 8th Duke of Rutland). They divorced, without having issue, in 1969.

=== Second marriage ===
He married his second wife, Jane Leveson, a daughter of Arthur Edmund Leveson (son of Admiral Sir Arthur Cavenagh Leveson) and Margaret Ruth Maude (a daughter of G/Capt. Christopher Edward Maude), in 1979. Jane is one of the official Queen's companions to Queen Camilla. Together, they are the parents of three children:

- Frederick Patrick Piers von Westenholz (b. 1980)
- Violet Marguerite von Westenholz (b. 1983)
- Victoria Lilly von Westenholz (b. 1986), who works at Westenholz with her father.

With his second wife, he has led the restoration of Dumfries House, a personal project of King Charles III.
