= Jane von Westenholz =

British courtier (born 1953)

Baroness Jane von Westenholz
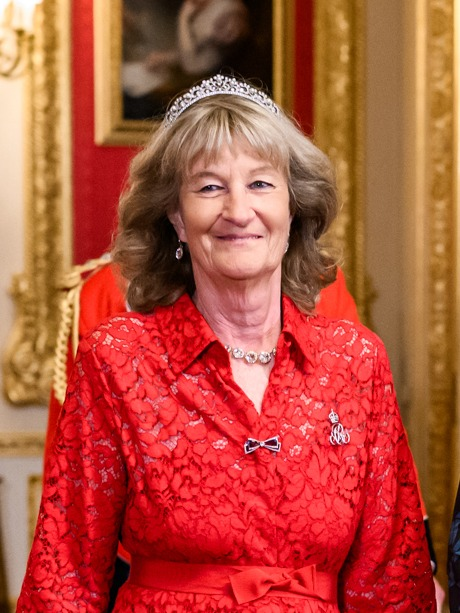
- Baroness von Westenholz in 2025
- Born: Jane Leveson; 15 May 1953 (age 73)
- Spouse: Baron Piers von Westenholz (m. 1979)
- Children: 3
- Relatives: Sir Arthur Leveson (grandfather)

Baroness Jane von Westenholz (née Leveson; born 15 May 1953) is a British aristocrat and member of the Royal Household of the United Kingdom. She was appointed as one of six Queen's companions by Queen Camilla in 2022.

== Early life and family ==
Westenholz was born Jane Leveson on 15 May 1953 to Arthur Edmund Leveson and Margaret Ruth Maude Leveson. Her paternal grandfather was Admiral Sir Arthur Cavenagh Leveson and her maternal grandfather was Gp Capt Christopher Edward Maude.

== Member of the Royal Household ==
In November 2022, Westenholz was appointed by Queen Camilla to serve in the British Royal Household as one of her Queen's companions. She was selected due to her personal friendship with the queen. She took part in the ceremonies for the coronation of King Charles III and Queen Camilla.

In June 2024, she and her husband accompanied the king and queen to the Royal Ascot and were part of the royal carriage procession.

On 17 September 2025, she attended the queen during a state banquet as part of the 2025 state visit by Donald Trump to the United Kingdom.

Along with her husband, Westenholz aided in Charles III's restoration of Dumfries House.

== Personal life ==
In 1979, she married Baron Frederick Patrick Piers von Westenholz, an interior designer and alpine skier. They have three children:

- Baron Frederick Patrick Piers von Westenholz (b. 1980)
- Baroness Violet Marguerite von Westenholz (b. 1983)
- Baroness Victoria Lilly von Westenholz (b. 1986)

One of her daughters, Violet, introduced Prince Harry to Meghan Markle.

She lives in Hertfordshire. Westenholz is also known by the nickname "Lofty".
